= Bad Girls series 3 =

Bad Girls
- Season 3
- Re-Release DVD
- Starring: Simone Lahbib; Claire King; Mandana Jones; Debra Stephenson; Linda Henry; Jack Ellis
- No. of episodes: 16

Release
- Original network: ITV
- Original release: 20 March – 3 July 2001

Series chronology
- ← Previous; Series 2 Next → Series 4

Bad Girls returned to ITV with its third series on 20 March 2001 and ended on 3 July 2001. It consists of 16 episodes.

== Storylines ==
The third series picks up directly from the series two finale. Shell has led Fenner into her trap by luring him into her cell and stabbing him with a broken bottle she smuggled back from Bodybag's anniversary party. Fenner almost loses his life, while Hollamby has Shell transferred to the mental health wing where she comes face-to-face with an old enemy. Helen manages to get Nikki back into Larkhall where Helen puts an end to their relationship. Shell and Denny escape and wreak havoc in London, as they pay Hollamby a surprise visit at her home. Things seem to be going well for Crystal, who has recently been released from prison and is now engaged to Josh, but things are set to get worse as Shell and Denny arrive at her house. Maxi and Tina Purvis and Al MacKenzie (aka The Peckham Bootgang) arrive on G-Wing and make their presence known to the prisoners and officers alike. Josh has just become a prison officer, but he's in for a shock when he sees that Crystal is back on the wing. Nikki is set for her appeal, and if she wins, will she find Helen waiting for her?

== Cast ==
=== Main ===
- Simone Lahbib as Helen Stewart
- Claire King as Karen Betts
- Mandana Jones as Nikki Wade
- Debra Stephenson as Shell Dockley
- Linda Henry as Yvonne Atkins
- Jack Ellis as Jim Fenner
- Alicya Eyo as Denny Blood
- Sharon Duncan-Brewster as Crystal Gordon
- Nathan Constance as Josh Mitchell
- Isabelle Amyes as Barbara Hunt
- Lindsey Fawcett as Shaz Wylie
- Kim Oliver as Buki Lester
- Kerry Norton as Maxi Purvis
- Victoria Bush as Tina Purvis
- Pauline Campbell as Al McKenzie
- Lisa Turner as Gina Rossi
- Paul Opacic as Mark Waddle
- Tracey Wilkinson as Di Barker
- Helen Fraser as Sylvia Hollamby
- Victoria Alcock as Julie Saunders
- Kika Mirylees as Julie Johnston

=== Special guest ===
- Kate O'Mara as Virginia O'Kane

=== Recurring ===
- Michael Higgs as Dr. Thomas Waugh
- Kate Steavenson-Payne as Charlotte Myddleton
- Philip McGough as Dr. Malcolm Nicholson
- Roland Oliver as Simon Stubberfield
- Kim Taylforth as Marilyn Fenner
- Eugene Walker as Officer Blakeson
- Danielle King as Lauren Atkins
- Ivan Kaye as Charlie Atkins
- Geoffrey Hutchings as Bobby Hollamby
- Wendi Peters as Pam Jolly
- Helen Schlesinger as Tessa Spall
- Jane Lowe as Monica Lindsay
- Steven Webb as David Saunders
- Anthonia Lanre-Ajose as Femi Bada
- Helen Grace as Caroline Lewis
- Victoria Pritchard as Trisha

=== Guest ===
- Petia Pavlova as Prison Inmate
- Sally Watts as Betty Wheeler
- Sarah Crook as DC Johnstone
- Ian Dunn as Trevor
- Nick Burnell as Mr. Meadows
- Marlene Sidaway as Mrs. Barker
- Martin Crewes as Guy Cullen
- Carl Brincat as Ian Ravenscroft
- Tim Faraday as DS Hamilton
- Clare Moody as Amanda Hunt
- Dan Fredenburgh as Greg Hunt
- John Rowe as Judge Shuttlewood
- Dione Inman as Clerk of Court
- Tom Cotcher as Mr. Jones
- Bob Barrett as Mr. Levi
- Adam Croft as TV reporter
- Paula Bacon as Fiona
- Andrew Grainger as Chris Bisset
- Hugh Lee as Mike
- Nick Clark as Newsreader
- Sarah Neville as Mrs. Warner
- Maxwell Hutcheon as Mr. Casey
- Sam Halpenny as DS Culver
- Rory MacGregor as PC Waterhouse
- Joanne Mitchell as Jude Longley
- Sara Lloyd as Jo
- Jane How as Lady Myddleton
- Mark Pegg as PO MacFarlane
- Joy Elias-Rilwan as Interpreter
- Juley McCann as Sheila
- Rachel Bavidge as DST Officer
- Shola Adewusi as Fatima Ibraham
- Selva Rasalingam as DC Patel
- Amanda Gordon as Dionne Clarke
- Maureen Beattie as Marion McLoughlin
- Danielle Lydon as Claire Walker
- David Henry as Gordon Alexander
- Bernard Gallagher as Judge Hardy
- Beth Fitzgerald as Sally Ann Howe
- Anna Maria Ashe as Newsreader
- Alberto Banderas as Spanish policeman

== Episodes ==
No. overall	No. in series	Title	Directed by	Written by	Original release date	UK viewers (millions)
24	1	"Back From the Brink"	Mike Adams	Maureen Chadwick	20 March 2001	9.42
Revenge-hungry Shell is armed and locked in a cell with Fenner. The officers, still recovering from Sylvia's party, must take drastic action. Helen too returns escaped prisoner Nikki to Larkhall.
25	2	"The Turn of the Screw"	Mike Adams	Jayne Hollinson	27 March 2001	8.49
Fenner dies but is resuscitated and transferred to the hospital. Karen reveals that Dominic is not returning to the prison service. Sylvia is determined to make Shell suffer for her attack on Fenner and gets her moved to a psychiatric ward. "Mad" Tessa, Shell's old adversary, is ready and waiting to do the rest and Shell meets "Podger" Pam. Sylvia proposes a strike when Shell is returned to G-Wing.
26	3	"The Chains of Freedom"	Laurence Moody	Phil Ford	3 April 2001	8.59
Shell is returned to G-Wing but is confined to her cell. Julie S is out of prison on a tag and meets her old flame, Trevor. The women jump at the chance to run the wing themselves, when the strike takes place and the officers are on "sick leave", things are going swimmingly – until a large knife goes missing. Note: guest appearance of Monica Lindsay (Jane Lowe); first appearance of Gina Rossi (Lisa Turner)
27	4	"False Identity"	Laurence Moody	Martin Allen	10 April 2001	9.10
Julie S is back in Larkhall. Babs is shocked to hear that she's been accused of bigamy and murder. New officer Gina Rossi arrives and stirs up trouble for Shell and the officers. Yvonne is getting legal advice of her own – from a succession of hunky young men, until her husband's lawyer turns up.
28	5	"Blood Ties"	Laurence Moody	Liz Lake	17 April 2001	8.60
New girl on the wing Buki Lester challenges Denny to prove how tough she is, while Yvonne challenges husband Charlie in court. Denny almost bleeds to death and Fenner returns to work to find Shell waiting for him. Also, Charlie receives a gift in the form of a pizza man. Note: first appearance of Buki Lester (Kim Oliver)
29	6	"Do or Die"	Jo Johnson	Maureen Chadwick	24 April 2001	8.84
Tensions mount as "Podger" Pam arrives on G-Wing and the new doctor, Dr. Waugh, impresses Helen, who is upset with Nikki when she lashes out following her spontaneous cell fire. Josh begins his stint as a trainee PO under the ever-watchful eye of Di, who claims to have just come out of a relationship but starts a new obsession with Josh.
30	7	"The Great Escape"	Jo Johnson	Jaden Clark	1 May 2001	8.51
A fly-on-the-wall documentary crew invades HMP Larkhall, creating havoc in the process. Buki cuts up and reveals the truth of her childhood. Fenner sees a chance to get rid of Shell for good.
31	8	"Uninvited Guests"	Mike Adams	Phil Ford	8 May 2001	9.14
Shell and Denny celebrate their freedom with a vodka and cocaine binge. But before they make it to the airport they have a few grudges to settle, starting with Sylvia and Bobby Hollamby. Shaz is returned to Larkhall along with Crystal.
32	9	"Common Criminal"	Mike Adams	Martin Allen	15 May 2001	9.10
Aristocratic "it-girl" Charlotte Myddleton is sentenced to a year in Larkhall for drug offences and the other inmates don't react too kindly to the new Prada-clad prisoner, but they begin to help her when she attempts suicide. Note: first appearance of Mark Waddle (Paul Opacic)
33	10	"Chapel of Love"	Jim O'Hanlon	Jayne Hollinson	22 May 2001	8.40
Crystal is on hunger strike to protest against her incorrect drugs test results and it seems that only new girl Charlotte can save her. Di begins to abuse her mother when Josh confronts her about her deceit. Di then schemes to stop Josh and Crystal's wedding in a small ceremony in the prison chapel. Also, a new group of girls arrive, calling themselves the Peckham Boot Gang. Note: first appearances of Maxi Purvis (Kerry Norton), Tina Purvis (Victoria Bush) and Al Mackenzie (Pauline Campbell)
32	11	"Battle Lines"	Jim O'Hanlon	Jaden Clark	29 May 2001	8.60
The Peckham Boot Gang arrive on G-Wing and stir up trouble. Al McKenzie begins bully Shaz. When Nigerian prisoner Femi is bullied by the officers, Nikki organises a sit-in to help. But with the Peckham Boot Gang involved, things look like getting out of hand, and a riot takes place on G-Wing. Plus, the Peckham Boot Gang reveals their plan to get rid of Yvonne, after Yvonne batters Al.
35	12	"Tough Love"	Jim O'Hanlon	Martin Allen	5 June 2001	8.41
The fall-out from the riot leaves Nikki very unpopular so she is grateful of support from an attractive new prisoner, Caroline, that is until Maxi Purvis finds some nasty surprises in Caroline's past. The Julies are released and arrested in the space of 5 minutes.
36	13	"Revolving Doors"	Laurence Moody	Jayne Hollinson	12 June 2001	8.46
The Julies are returned to Larkhall on remand along with wealthy madame Virginia O'Kane, an old friend, but both the inmates and officers are ill-equipped to deal with the disabled grand dame, but she hides a secret. Maxi warns her sister Tina to stay away from Virginia. Note: first appearance of Virginia O'Kane (guest star Kate O'Mara)
37	14	"Fronting Up"	Laurence Moody	Jaden Clark	19 June 2001	8.18
Fenner and Virginia strike a deal that could make him a very rich man. Helen gets wind of it and sets out to prove that Fenner is unfit to work with woman prisoners with the help of Yvonne. The Peckham Boot Gang reveals Virginia's secret causing her to be very unpopular. Note: final appearance of Gina Rossi (Lisa Turner) Alternative title: "Standing Up"
38	15	"Cat & Mouse"	Di Patrick	Phil Ford	26 June 2001	8.12
Yvonne exposes the deal between Fenner and Virginia. Fenner decides to strike back – and Babs' diary gives him all the leverage he needs, but this could mean trouble for Nikki. Al and Maxi get annoyed when Tina breaks away from the gang and continues to be friends with Virginia.
39	16	"Coming Out"	Di Patrick	Jaden Clark	3 July 2001	8.15
Fenner proposes to Karen and gets cosy with Maxi. The Peckham Boot Gang make up with Virginia but all is not what it seems. Fenner's campaign against Helen hots up and Nikki's appeal gives him the ideal outlet for his schemes. Crystal announces a miracle, but even the divine cannot help Yvonne who is accused of murder. Note: final appearances of Helen Stewart (Simone Lahbib), Nikki Wade (Mandana Jones), Shell Dockley (Debra Stephenson) (as a main character, until a guest appearance in Series 5) and Virginia O'Kane (guest star Kate O'Mara)

== Reception ==
=== Ratings ===
No.	Title	Air date	Timeslot	Weekly ratings		Ref(s)
No.	Title	Air date	Timeslot	Viewers	Rank	Ref(s)
1	Back from the Brink	20 March 2001	Tuesday 9:00 pm	9,420,000	16	
2	The Turn of the Screw	27 March 2001	Tuesday 9:00 pm	8,490,000	17	
3	The Chains of Freedom	3 April 2001	Tuesday 9:00 pm	8,590,000	14	
4	False Identity	10 April 2001	Tuesday 9:00 pm	9,100,000	12	
5	Blood Ties	17 April 2001	Tuesday 9:00 pm	8,600,000	14	
6	Do it Die	24 April 2001	Tuesday 9:00 pm	8,840,000	13	
7	The Great Escape	1 May 2001	Tuesday 9:00 pm	8,510,000	11	
8	Uninvited Guests	8 May 2001	Tuesday 9:00 pm	9,140,000	6	
9	Common Criminal	15 May 2001	Tuesday 9:00 pm	9,100,000	9	
10	Chapel of Love	22 May 2001	Tuesday 9:00 pm	8,400,000	6	
11	Battle Lines	29 May 2001	Tuesday 9:00 pm	8,600,000	11	
12	Tough Love	5 June 2001	Tuesday 9:00 pm	8,410,000	9	
13	Revolving Doors	12 June 2001	Tuesday 9:00 pm	8,460,000	13	
14	Fronting Up	19 June 2001	Tuesday 9:00 pm	8,180,000	10	
15	Cat & Mouse	26 June 2001	Tuesday 9:00 pm	8,120,000	11	
16	Coming Out	3 July 2001	Tuesday 9:00 pm	8,150,000	10	

=== Awards and nominations ===
- EMMA Awards (2001) – TV Actress (Alicya Eyo ― Nominated)
- National Television Awards (2001) – Most Popular Actress (Debra Stephenson – Nominated)
- National Television Awards (2001) – Most Popular Drama (Won)
- TV Quick Awards (2001) – Best Actress (Debra Stephenson – Won)
- TV Quick Awards (2001) – Best Loved Drama (Won)

== Release ==
The third series of Bad Girls was originally released on VHS format in the UK, consisting of 5 volumes. The DVD was released on 25 March 2002. A re-release DVD is expected to be released in 2011, both as a single and also in a boxset along with series four. Series three was released in the series one-four boxset on 9 October 2006.

In Australia, series three was released on 8 September 2003 in the same cover packaging as the UK DVD. A second release was made when it was released in the series one-eight boxset, "The Complete Collection", on 10 November 2010. It was also released separate for the complete boxset on 9 March 2011.

Bad Girls: Series Three
Set Details		Special Features
16 episodes; 6-disc set; 4-disc set (re-release); 4:3 aspect ratio; 16:9 aspect ratio (re-release); Subtitles: no; English (stereo)		Interactive Map of Larkhall Prison; Outtakes; Prison File: Behind the Scenes, Subsidiary Character Profiles and Interviews: Sharon Duncan-Brewster (crystal; Victoria Bush (Tina); Pauline Campbell (Al); Jack Ellis (Jim); Claire King (Karen); Simone Lahbib (Helen); Nathan Constance (Josh); Helen Fraser (Sylvia); Lara Cazalet (Zandra); Kika Mirylees (Julie J); Lindsey Fawcett (Shaz); Mandana Jones (Nikki); Tracey Wilkinson (Di); Linda Henry (Yvonne); Audio CD: Features music from the series
Release Dates		Interactive Map of Larkhall Prison; Outtakes; Prison File: Behind the Scenes, Subsidiary Character Profiles and Interviews: Sharon Duncan-Brewster (crystal; Victoria Bush (Tina); Pauline Campbell (Al); Jack Ellis (Jim); Claire King (Karen); Simone Lahbib (Helen); Nathan Constance (Josh); Helen Fraser (Sylvia); Lara Cazalet (Zandra); Kika Mirylees (Julie J); Lindsey Fawcett (Shaz); Mandana Jones (Nikki); Tracey Wilkinson (Di); Linda Henry (Yvonne); Audio CD: Features music from the series
United Kingdom	Australia	Interactive Map of Larkhall Prison; Outtakes; Prison File: Behind the Scenes, Subsidiary Character Profiles and Interviews: Sharon Duncan-Brewster (crystal; Victoria Bush (Tina); Pauline Campbell (Al); Jack Ellis (Jim); Claire King (Karen); Simone Lahbib (Helen); Nathan Constance (Josh); Helen Fraser (Sylvia); Lara Cazalet (Zandra); Kika Mirylees (Julie J); Lindsey Fawcett (Shaz); Mandana Jones (Nikki); Tracey Wilkinson (Di); Linda Henry (Yvonne); Audio CD: Features music from the series
25 March 2002; 4 July 2011 (re-release)	8 September 2003; 9 March 2011 (re-release)	Interactive Map of Larkhall Prison; Outtakes; Prison File: Behind the Scenes, Subsidiary Character Profiles and Interviews: Sharon Duncan-Brewster (crystal; Victoria Bush (Tina); Pauline Campbell (Al); Jack Ellis (Jim); Claire King (Karen); Simone Lahbib (Helen); Nathan Constance (Josh); Helen Fraser (Sylvia); Lara Cazalet (Zandra); Kika Mirylees (Julie J); Lindsey Fawcett (Shaz); Mandana Jones (Nikki); Tracey Wilkinson (Di); Linda Henry (Yvonne); Audio CD: Features music from the series
