= Bad Girls series 5 =

2003 season of British TV series

Bad Girls
- Season 5
- Re-release Region 2 DVD
- Starring: Claire King; Linda Henry; Jack Ellis
- No. of episodes: 16

Release
- Original network: ITV
- Original release: 8 May – 21 August 2003

Series chronology
- ← Previous; Series 4 Next → Series 6

The fifth series of Bad Girls was broadcast on ITV from 8 May 2003 to 21 August 2003; it was the third and final series to feature 16 episodes.

The series saw the return of Shell Dockley (Debra Stephenson), who was presumed dead following an escape from authorities at the end of the third series.

== Storylines ==
It is discovered Shaz Wiley died during the fire cliffhanger of series 4; her girlfriend, Denny Blood (Alicya Eyo), is determined to get revenge on Snowball Merriman (Nicole Faraday) for setting off the bomb.

Escapee Shell Dockley (Debra Stephenson) is found in Amsterdam by Jim Fenner (Jack Ellis) and other male officers from Larkhall. Heavily pregnant, Shell is returned to Larkhall, where she is reunited with Denny. Shell tricks Snowball into thinking they can be friends and she can give her a makeover, which results in Denny and Shell setting Snowball's hair on fire, and they both begin bullying her.

Fenner pimps Shell by offering her money to give the male officers a handjob. After the baby's birth, officer Colin Hedges tries to force her to have sex; when she violently refuses, Fenner makes it seem as if she tried to smother her baby. Shell is transferred to a mental home and her baby is taken into care.

Things go from bad to worse for Snowball, with the prisoners refusing to forgive her, constantly heckling, taunting and insulting her at every opportunity and giving her raw food to eat. Snowball tries numerous escape tactics all with disastrous consequences. First, she accidentally shoots her boyfriend Richie Atkins, resulting in his becoming paralysed; they later have a suicide pact, which goes wrong, resulting in Richie dying, but not Snowball. Richie's mother, Yvonne Atkins (Linda Henry), who hates Snowball, later helps her commit suicide.

Sylvia Hollamby's (Helen Fraser) husband, Bobby, commits suicide, leaving her in debt. New prisoners the "Costa Cons", Bev Tull (Amanda Barrie) and Phyl Oswyn (Stephanie Beacham), arrive and after convincing Denny they can contact Shaz's spirit, Hollamby falls for it and gets them to contact her late husband. Babs Hunt (Isabelle Amyes) marries the former prison chaplain, Henry Mills – bad news for Sylvia, who had set her sights on Henry after she was widowed.

The ongoing feud between Fenner and Wing Governor Karen Betts (Claire King) reaches its climax as Fenner ruthlessly frames Karen for a hit-and-run accident in which a man dies. Neil Grayling divorces Di, and comes out as gay, also giving Di the job of wing governor, as long as she carries his baby, which she has actually aborted. Di and Fenner grow close.

Julie Saunders is diagnosed with breast cancer and takes the decision to take her chances without chemotherapy treatment. This causes a rift between the two Julies and their new friend Julie O'Kane (Victoria Bush) who decides to change her name again, this time to Tina O'Kane.

New prison officer Selena Geeson (Charlotte Lucas) and new inmate Kris Yates (Jennifer Ness) are in a relationship. Kris is taking the rap for killing her abusive father in order to spare her younger sister, the real culprit. Fenner's nefarious ways continue when he kills Yvonne as she tries to escape Larkhall, by ensuring that she will be trapped in the "hanging cell", a small room beneath the main prison that is blocked off from the outside world.

The final episode sees the last appearances of Denny, Yvonne, Barbara, Buki and Henry Mills.

== Cast ==
=== Main ===
- Claire King as Karen Betts
- Linda Henry as Yvonne Atkins
- Jack Ellis as Jim Fenner
- Alicya Eyo as Denny Blood
- Isabelle Amyes as Barbara Hunt
- Kim Oliver as Buki Lester
- Victoria Bush as Julie O'Kane/Tina O'Kane
- Pauline Campbell as Al McKenzie
- James Gaddas as Neil Grayling
- Nicole Faraday as Snowball Merriman
- Tristan Sturrock as Colin Hedges
- Stephanie Beacham as Phyl Oswin
- Amanda Barrie as Beverly Tull
- Charlotte Lucas as Selena Geeson
- Jennifer Ness as Kris Yates
- Tracey Wilkinson as Di Barker
- Helen Fraser as Sylvia Hollamby
- Victoria Alcock as Julie Saunders
- Kika Mirylees as Julie Johnston

=== Special guest ===
- Debra Stephenson as Shell Dockley
- Christopher Biggins as himself

=== Recurring ===
- Alex King as Ritchie Atkins
- Michael Elwyn as Rev. Henry Mills
- Philip McGough as Dr. Malcolm Nicholson
- Maria Charles as Noreen Biggs
- Geoffrey Hutchings as Bobby Hollamby
- Danielle King as Lauren Atkins
- Paul Brennen as Eric Bostock
- Jamie King as Tony
- Nikki Amuka-Bird as Officer Paula Miles
- Eugene Walker as Officer Blakeson
- Holly Palmer as Milly Yates

=== Guest ===
- Martina Berne as Marieke
- Natasha O'Neal as Nightclub dancer
- Zoe-Anne Phillips as Nightclub dancer
- Petia Pavlova as Prison Inmate
- Gregory Floy as Mr. Pugh
- Jochum ten Haaf as Dutch Police Sergeant
- Jo Cowen as Terri
- Frances Jeater as Mrs. Derbyshire
- Mark Laurie as PO Potter
- Adam Christopher as PO Jenkins
- John O'Mahony as Duty Medical officer
- Kate Terence as Nurse
- Gordon Cameron as Policeman
- Graham Kent as Stan Harvey
- Andy Rashleigh as Doug McBain
- Myles Senior Campbell as Lennox
- Timothy Davies as Vicar
- Ash Varrez as Dr. Khan
- Lynn Farleigh as Mrs. Williams
- Biddy Wells as Sandra Bradford
- Don Gallagher as DI Armitage
- Steven Cree as Waiter
- Robert Hudson as PO McArthur
- Ruth Platt as Lucy Kerridge
- Eamon Geoghegan as DS Rivers
- Simon Williams as Oliver Lilley
- Garfield Morgan as Clive Mills
- Elaine Claxton as Reverend Buxton

== Episodes ==
Series 5 was broadcast on Thursdays at 9:00pm.

| No. overall | No. in series | Title | Directed by | Written by | Original release date | UK viewers (millions) |
|---|---|---|---|---|---|---|
| 56 | 1 | "Episode One" | Mike Adams | Ann McManus & Maureen Chadwick | 8 May 2003 | 8.36 |
Fenner joins some of his PO mates on a lads' weekend in Amsterdam. They are all very taken with erotic dancer Nikki until they realise that her face is uncomfortably familiar. Denny vows to get revenge on Snowball. Babs tries to adjust to being deaf. Al and Tina plot to get a pardon like Cassie and Roisin. Sylvia and Bobby's lives are turned upside down when they are declared bankrupt. Snowball continues to try to escape to be with Richie. Note: guest starring Debra Stephenson as Shell Dockley; first appearance of Colin Hedges (Tristan Sturrock)
| 57 | 2 | "Episode Two" | Mike Adams | Jaden Clark | 15 May 2003 | 7.88 |
Shell arrives back on G-Wing and, with Denny, plans revenge on Snowball for Shaz's death. Fenner also has plans for Shell. Snowball retrieves her gun from its hiding place at Shaz's memorial and starts to put her escape plan into action, with the unwilling help of Karen. Bobby goes to an unsuccessful interview at Larkhall, resulting in his breakdown. Di is harassed by "Gnasher", an alias that Al and Tina are using. Babs gets her hearing back and reveals Snowball's plans to Yvonne, who makes plans of her own to stop Snowball and Richie. Note: final appearance of Bobby Hollamby (guest star Geoffrey Hutchings)
| 58 | 3 | "Episode Three" | Jim Loach | Phil Ford | 22 May 2003 | 7.63 |
Sylvia is left distraught by Bobby's actions. The Costa Cons, Phyl Oswyn and Bev Tull, arrive at Larkhall with a suitcase full of gin bottles and are immediately disgusted by the squalid conditions on G-Wing. Snowball's escape backfires and Richie is shot. Di catches Tina and Al in the middle of their crazy plan and puts a stop to it. Buki returns to G-Wing, while Shell is the only one who is not convinced by the Costa Cons. Snowball poisons herself. Note: first appearance of Phyl Oswyn (Stephanie Beacham) and Bev Tull (Amanda Barrie)
| 59 | 4 | "Episode Four" | Jim Loack | Guy Picot | 29 May 2003 | 6.92 |
Shell goes into labour. After being forced to fend off Colin Hedges' advances, Shell threatens to blow the whistle on Fenner and his pimping scheme, a decision that ultimately brings about disaster. Sylvia becomes the Costa Cons' latest sucker. Di uses "Gnasher" to get at Neil. The privatisation team arrives and upsets the prisoners and officers alike. Snowball makes another attempt to see Richie. Note: final appearance of Shell Dockley (guest star Debra Stephenson)
| 60 | 5 | "Episode Five" | A.J. Quinn | Phil Ford | 5 June 2003 | 7.10 |
Di is finding life with Neil increasingly frustrating, and when he starts entertaining his one-night stands at the marital home, it is the last straw. Sylvia cuts all her connections with Phyl and Bev.
| 61 | 6 | "Episode Six" | A.J. Quinn | Phil Ford | 12 June 2003 | 6.62 |
Snowball attempts to convince Neil that she has changed. Di plans to get pregnant, with the help of Neil's boyfriend. One of Phyl and Bev's many business ventures comes to light when Colin discovers the drugs stash hidden behind their mirror, but given his own little habit, it is unlikely that he will be shopping them. The Costa Cons have another plan for booze, in the garden.
| 62 | 7 | "Episode Seven" | A.J. Quinn | Jaden Clark | 19 June 2003 | 6.76 |
Fenner plans to set up Yvonne but Colin puts a stop to it. The presence of the media and a celebrity guest at HMP Larkhall gives the women a perfect opportunity to make a very public protest about the prison's forthcoming privatisation. Phyl and Bev are transferred to an open prison. Di's plans for pregnancy are successful. Snowball and Richie make a suicide pact but only one of them dies.
| 63 | 8 | "Episode Eight" | Julie Edwards | Ann McManus & Maureen Chadwick | 26 June 2003 | 6.36 |
Julie S finds a lump on her breast and worries that it could be cancer. Colin escorts Yvonne to Richie's funeral and is placed in a very difficult position when Fenner plants a bag of cocaine on her upon their return.
| 64 | 9 | "Episode Nine" | Julie Edwards | Liz Lake | 3 July 2003 | 6.53 |
Julie S struggles to come to terms with the reality of her mastectomy and the prospect of a debilitating course of chemotherapy. Colin tells Karen about Fenner setting up Yvonne. Yvonne and Colin grow closer. Neil is adamant on kicking Di out, despite her being pregnant.
| 65 | 10 | "Episode Ten" | Laurence Moody | Jo O'Keefe | 10 July 2003 | 6.57 |
Karen persuades Neil to take Snowball out of solitary confinement in the hope that it will lift her spirits, but all Snowball wants is to be reunited with Richie. Yvonne is roped into protecting Snowball but she helps her to be with Richie. Fenner becomes Tina's knight in shining armour when he moves her out of the Four Bed Dorm away from nasty Al and Buki. Di's infidelity is revealed when she and Neil are tested for syphilis.
| 66 | 11 | "Episode Eleven" | Laurence Moody | Di Burrows | 17 July 2003 | 6.58 |
Snowball's suicide note makes some serious allegations against Fenner, which in light of the accusations made against him by Karen and Helen could get him into serious trouble. Di has her pregnancy terminated but does not inform Neil or Tony. Fenner and Tina plan to set up Yvonne. Karen is sacked by Neil. Note: final appearance of Snowball Merriman (Nicole Faraday)
| 67 | 12 | "Episode Twelve" | Jim Loach | Liz Lake | 24 July 2003 | 6.53 |
Karen and Neil come to a compromise. Di and Neil reveal their split, in which Neil outs himself, and plans for surrogacy. A familiar face is welcomed back to Larkhall as old-timer Noreen Biggs arrives back on G-Wing. Unfortunately, she will not be detained at Her Majesty's Pleasure for long, as she has not got long to live. Noreen tries to talk Tina round that Fenner is using her but Yvonne makes her see the light.
| 68 | 13 | "Episode Thirteen" | Jim Loack | Liz Lake | 31 July 2003 | 6.56 |
Julie S returns to Larkhall. Phyl and Bev are transferred back to Larkhall. Denny shows off her talent for art. Legal proceedings begin for Al, who is up for life for murdering Virginia. Henry quits and plans to marry Babs. Fenner breaks into Karen's flat and sees all of the evidence she has amassed against him. Deciding he must take action, he sneaks out with her car keys, coat and a bottle of alcohol. Karen is arrested the following morning. Note: final appearance of Karen Betts (Claire King) until a guest appearance in Series 6; first appearance of Selena Geeson (Charlotte Lucas)
| 69 | 14 | "Episode Fourteen" | Jim Loack | Di Burrows | 7 August 2003 | 6.43 |
Di becomes Wing Governor. Yvonne plans to get rid of Fenner for good. Bev and Phyl forge some of Denny's artwork. Buki finally meets her son, Lennox, with the help of Christopher Biggins. Di and Fenner go on a date and get intimate. New inmate lifer Kris Yates arrives at Larkhall and makes a big impression on everyone, so much so that new officer Selena Geeson requests that she be Kris's personal officer. Note: first appearance of Kris Yates (Jennifer Ness)
| 70 | 15 | "Episode Fifteen" | Julie Edwards | Di Burrows | 14 August 2003 | 6.54 |
Di fakes a miscarriage. Denny's planned art exhibition suffers a setback as a result of Phyl and Bev's eye on the bigger picture and the money they will squeeze out of their protege. Kris reveals she has an escape plan but Yvonne does not want to be a part of it. Yvonne's plan to fix Fenner goes into effect.
| 71 | 16 | "Episode Sixteen" | Julie Edwards | Liz Lake | 21 August 2003 | 6.78 |
Babs and Henry get married but Henry's brother leaves when he objects. Buki is looking forward to her release and Denny is transferred to an open prison. Yvonne gives into Kris and makes a bid for freedom by slipping into the cavernous depths of the prison, but Fenner is hot on her heels, intent on sorting her out once and for all, and in the most horrific manner imaginable. Note: final appearances of Denny Blood (Alicya Eyo), Yvonne Atkins (Linda Henry), Barbara Hunt (Isabelle Amyes) and Buki Lester (Kim Oliver)

== Reception ==
=== Ratings ===
| No. | Title | Air date | Timeslot | Weekly ratings | | Ref(s) |
| No. | Title | Air date | Timeslot | Viewers | Rank | Ref(s) |
|---|---|---|---|---|---|---|
| 1 | Episode 1 | 8 May 2003 | Thursday 9:00 pm | 8,360,000 | 17 | |
| 2 | Episode 2 | 15 May 2003 | Thursday 9:00 pm | 7,880,000 | 15 | |
| 3 | Episode 3 | 22 May 2003 | Thursday 9:00 pm | 7,630,000 | 12 | |
| 4 | Episode 4 | 29 May 2003 | Thursday 9:00 pm | 6,920,000 | 11 | |
| 5 | Episode 5 | 5 June 2003 | Thursday 9:00 pm | 7,100,000 | 14 | |
| 6 | Episode 6 | 12 June 2003 | Thursday 9:00 pm | 6,620,000 | 12 | |
| 7 | Episode 7 | 19 June 2003 | Thursday 9:00 pm | 6,760,000 | 12 | |
| 8 | Episode 8 | 26 June 2003 | Thursday 9:00 pm | 6,360,000 | 14 | |
| 9 | Episode 9 | 3 July 2003 | Thursday 9:00 pm | 6,530,000 | 13 | |
| 10 | Episode 10 | 10 July 2003 | Thursday 9:00 pm | 6,570,000 | 13 | |
| 11 | Episode 11 | 17 July 2003 | Thursday 9:00 pm | 6,580,000 | 14 | |
| 12 | Episode 12 | 24 July 2003 | Thursday 9:00 pm | 6,530,000 | 15 | |
| 13 | Episode 13 | 31 July 2003 | Thursday 9:00 pm | 6,560,000 | 15 | |
| 14 | Episode 14 | 7 August 2003 | Thursday 9:00 pm | 6,430,000 | 14 | |
| 15 | Episode 15 | 14 August 2003 | Thursday 9:00 pm | 6,540,000 | 14 | |
| 16 | Episode 16 | 21 August 2003 | Thursday 9:00 pm | 6,780,000 | 13 | |

=== Awards and nominations ===
- Inside Soap Awards (2003) – Best Drama (Won)
- National Television Awards (2003) – Most Popular Drama (Nominated)
- TV Quick Awards (2003) – Best Actress (Claire King – Won)
- TV Quick Awards (2003) – Best Loved Drama (Won)
