= Bad Girls series 4 =

Season of television series

Bad Girls
- Season 4
- Re-release Region 2 DVD
- Starring: Claire King; Linda Henry; Jack Ellis
- No. of episodes: 16

Release
- Original network: ITV
- Original release: 28 February – 13 June 2002

Series chronology
- ← Previous; Series 3 Next → Series 5

The fourth series of Bad Girls was broadcast on ITV from 28 February 2002, concluded on 13 June 2002 and featured 16 episodes.

== Storylines ==
Yvonne Atkins (Linda Henry) is being framed for Virginia O'Kane's (Kate O'Mara) murder. There is a game of cat and mouse between her and Jim Fenner (Jack Ellis) while the real culprits, Maxi Purvis (Kerry Norton) and Al McKenzie (Pauline Campbell), continue their reign over G-Wing. It is not long before Yvonne is ruling the roost again, when Denny Blood (Alicya Eyo) returns and tricks Al into confessing to Virginia's murder.

New inmates Roisin Connor and Cassie Tyler are imprisoned for fraud and in a relationship, complicated, not only by their being behind bars, but by Roisin being a married mother-of-two. The stress of G-Wing mounts for Karen Betts (Claire King), especially when she and Fenner split, but the stress is no longer her problem when she is demoted to basic officer and he is promoted to Wing Governor by Neil Grayling (James Gaddas), the new Governing Governor, who develops an attraction to Fenner. Grayling is trying to keep his sexuality a secret, so he and desperate Di Barker (Tracey Wilkinson) participate in a sham marriage, although Di believes she can change his sexuality, which pushes Grayling away.

The bitter hatred between Maxi and Shaz Wiley (Lindsey Fawcett) grows and ends in tragedy following a brutal fight. Crystal Gordon (Sharon Duncan Brewster) gives birth in the four bed dorm to a daughter but soon loses her faith in religion when another baby in the prison dies. Rhiannon Dawson, Julie Johnston's (Kika Mirylees) daughter, arrives on the wing and the Julies are soon facing an additional sentence when the truth about Rhiannon's relationship with her boyfriend, Damion, is revealed. The series tackles domestic violence within the relationship of Di and Barry Pearce, and also sees teenage junkie Buki Lester (Kim Oliver) attempt to turn her life around when she enters into a battle for the right to see her disabled son, Lennox.

Yvonne and Karen find themselves at war when Yvonne's son, Ritchie, is revealed to be having a relationship with Karen. This is later revealed as a decoy, as his real girlfriend is new devious inmate Snowball Merriman (Nicole Faraday), whom Ritchie is helping to escape from Larkhall. The series ends with the prison library being obliterated as part of an escape plan by Snowball, resulting in a fire that leaves several inmates trapped and fighting for their lives.

== Cast ==
=== Main cast ===
- Claire King as Karen Betts
- Linda Henry as Yvonne Atkins
- Jack Ellis as Jim Fenner
- Alicya Eyo as Denny Blood
- Sharon Duncan Brewster as Crystal Gordon
- Isabelle Amyes as Barbara Hunt
- Lindsey Fawcett as Shaz Wylie
- Paul Opacic as Mark Waddle
- Kim Oliver as Buki Lester
- Kerry Norton as Maxi Purvis
- Victoria Bush as Tina Purvis/Julie O'Kane
- Pauline Campbell as Al McKenzie
- James Gaddas as Neil Grayling
- Kellie Bright as Cassie Tyler
- Siobhan McCarthy as Roisin Connor
- Nicole Faraday as Snowball Merriman
- Tracey Wilkinson as Di Barker
- Helen Fraser as Sylvia Hollamby
- Victoria Alcock as Julie Saunders
- Kika Mirylees as Julie Johnston

=== Recurring ===
- Nathan Constance as Josh Mitchell
- Alex King as Ritchie Atkins
- Michael Elwyn as Rev. Henry Mills
- Andrew Lancel as Barry Pearce
- Jade Williams as Rhiannon Dawson
- Maria Charles as Noreen Biggs
- Eugene Walker as Officer Blakeson

=== Guest ===
- Owen Oakeshott as DC O'Leary
- Graham Turner as Curtis
- Lucy Alexander as Newsreader
- Petia Pavlova as Prison Inmate
- David Cann as Francis Cowan
- Susannah Saary as Receptionist
- Mike Dowling as Aidan Connor
- Richard Dixon as Graham Hutton
- Patrick Cremin as DS Davidson
- Adam Leese as Damian Morrison
- Sarah Hadland as Spike
- Vanessa Earl as Nurse Kitt
- Rosemary Smith as Officer Lightfoot
- Lisa Krelset as Nessie
- Alice Kennedy as WPC Lowry
- Martin Milman as Inspector Simms
- Mathilda Thorpe as Inspector Shaw
- Tom Keller as Vince Purvis
- Sarah Winman as Susan Franklin
- David Roper as Mr. Adams
- Bill Wallis as Judge Bradshaw
- Annoushka Le Gallois as Jillian Tyler
- Charis Thomas as Lisa Bell
- Glyn Lewis as Sean Wilson
- Ryan Prygodzicz as Michael Connor
- Polly Kissock as Niamh Connor
- Irene Rambota as Nurse Moss
- Elizabeth Rider as Ms. Green
- Chook Sibtain as Naj Khan Din
- Doyne Byrd as Businessman
- Fenella Norman as PO Harrington

== Episodes ==
No. overall	No. in series	Title	Directed by	Written by	Original release date	UK viewers (millions)
40	1	"Fight or Flight"	Jo Johnson	Jaden Clark	28 February 2002	7.56
Virginia is dead – but who is responsible? Yvonne masterminds a plot to escape a life sentence. Jim is forced to explain himself to Karen. Josh reveals that he is the father of Crystal's baby and resigns. Al and Maxi continue to take over.
41	2	"Unholy Alliances"	Jo Johnson	Phil Ford	7 March 2002	6.83
Yvonne's escape attempt is thwarted by Karen. New Governor Neil Grayling arrives at Larkhall and is determined to make his mark. He is unimpressed with Karen and starts to look for a new Wing Governor – surely not Fenner? Di meets new officer Barry Pearce but he is not so nice. Fenner and Karen split up. Note: first appearance of Neil Grayling (James Gaddas)
42	3	"Behind Closed Doors"	Jo Johnson	Nick Malmholt & Miranda Wilson	14 March 2002	7.30
Fenner is Governor again and Karen is just a PO. Fenner is horrified to learn that Yvonne did not murder Virginia and realising the real culprit forces him and Yvonne into an uneasy alliance. Barry and Di's wedding is cancelled with help from the women but Barry reacts badly and Di ends up with a broken hand.
43	4	"Fait Accompli"	David Holroyd	Maureen Chadwick	21 March 2002	7.33
Denny arrives back on G-Wing, with two new inmates, Cassie Tyler and Roisin Connor. Not only is Shaz blanking her, but also she is disappointed to learn that she still has her old enemy Sylvia to contend with. Denny undergoes a makeover to get close to Al, just to help Yvonne catch Virginia's murderer. Barry turns very nasty when the women interfere with his relationship with Di again, but this time Di will not back him up. Note: first appearance of Cassie Tyler (Kellie Bright) and Roisin Connor (Siobhán McCarthy)
44	5	"Only the Lonely"	David Holroyd	Martin Allen	28 March 2002	6.82
Yvonne and Maxi fight, and Tina helps Yvonne when Virginia's killer is revealed. Denny and Shaz are back together and true to form. Neil continues to make himself unpopular – does he really have the prisoners' interests at heart or is this a personal vendetta against Karen? Roisin finds it hard to deal with prison life, but Cassie is living the life. Neil sets his sights on Fenner. Buki muscles in on Shaz and Denny's escape plan but she is left in the tunnel and it later collapses on her.
45	6	"Sweet Sixteen"	Craig Lines	Jaden Clark	4 April 2002	6.99
Julie J is distraught to find her daughter on G-Wing. Buki is rescued from the escape tunnel at the last minute but has to face the wrath of Shaz and Denny. Neil's sexuality is revealed. Buki reveals the truth about Rhiannon's "boyfriend" leading the Julies to make their biggest mistake ever.
46	7	"Pillow Talk"	Craig Lines	Phil Ford	11 April 2002	6.92
Fenner finally realises that his boss's interest in him extends far beyond the professional. Shaz and Denny find another opportunity to humiliate Buki but begin to push too far. Karen and Mark Waddle grow closer. Tina and Noreen take over the servery from the Julies.
47	8	"Prison Issue"	Brett Fallis	Jayne Hollinson	18 April 2002	7.10
Buki can no longer cope with the bullying and harms herself, although more seriously than she intended. Outraged, Yvonne wants to see that justice is done. Di and Neil grow closer. The women are not happy with Tina and Noreen's service. Roisin begins to take drugs to block out the pain of prison. Shaz and Denny fall out, and Maxi is there to help Shaz, but she really wants to frame Shaz for Virginia's murder.
48	9	"Baby On Board"	Brett Fallis	Martin Allen	25 April 2002	7.12
Yvonne and Maxi come to blows resulting in drastic consequences. G-Wing's tiniest inmate arrives when Crystal gives birth to baby Zandra on the floor of her cell. Fenner breaks down when the officers do not co-operate with him. Di sets her sights on Neil, despite Fenner's warnings. Buki wants to be on the MBU with Crystal and Zandra but when a baby goes missing, Buki reveals the truth, as to why she wants to be with babies, to Mark. Karen goes to see Fenner and he gets heavy with her.
49	10	"Family Matters"	Brett Fallis	Tim Hyndman	2 May 2002	6.90
Karen struggles to cope following Fenner's assault on her but realises that involving the police will be futile when the whole story comes out. On a day out, Crystal makes a desperate bid to get Zandra away from Larkhall. Buki grows closer to Baxter but his illness claims his life.
50	11	"Battle Lines"	David Holroyd	Jamie Caruana	9 May 2002	7.43
Fenner is back in uniform and Neil is in dire need of a new governor. Karen turns down the job, which means that there is only one candidate left – Sylvia. Emotions flare following Baxter's funeral. Shaz and Al plan to fight but Maxi wants to finish Shaz. The fight goes ahead with brutal, ultimately tragic, consequences.
51	12	"Appearances Sake"	David Holroyd	Jaden Clark	16 May 2002	7.12
Sylvia now has a dead body on her hands but an inspection team are also visiting the prison. Tina decides to clear the air with Maxi, who is nowhere to be found. Cassie and Roisin's relationship deteriorates further especially when Cassie has her eyes on Yvonne. Roisin begins to use drugs as a way of relieving her pain. Yvonne is delighted when her estranged son visits her. Babs and Henry grow closer, but Henry grasses on the women. Note: final appearance of Maxi Purvis (Kerry Norton)
52	13	"True Colours"	Di Patrick	Jamie Caruana	23 May 2002	7.35
The departure of Shaz has left a vacant cell on G-Wing, though it is immediately filled by a mystery American blonde, Snowball Merriman, who catches Fenner's eye. Yvonne recognises her while Karen recognise Yvonne's son. Denny spends her birthday down the block when she attacks Sylvia upon discovering Shaz has gone. Neil orders Sylvia to find Jesse, for Denny's sake. Di attempts to seduce Neil. The Julies go to court following their assault on Damien, with Rhiannon having no intention of helping her mother and her friend. Note: first appearance of Snowball Merriman (Nicole Faraday)
53	14	"Hard Knock Life"	Di Patrick	Jaden Clark	30 May 2002	6.59
Rhiannon tries to make amends with her mother and her friend when they are sentenced to eight years. Denny is thrilled when her mother is found, but her excitement is short-lived. Di has a suggestion for Neil, giving her companionship she craves and Neil an ideal means of staying in the closet. Roisin goes back on drugs. Crystal is released and Mark is transferred to another prison, but Mark has a word with Fenner before leaving. Note: final appearances of Crystal Gordon (Sharon Duncan Brewster) and Mark Waddle (Paul Opacic)
54	15	"Marriage of Inconvenience"	Jim O'Hanlon	Liz Lake	6 June 2002	6.33
Yvonne and Fenner both have different reasons to be concerned about Karen's new relationship. Snowball continues to wrap everyone on G-Wing around her little finger and goes ahead with her escape plan. Di and Neil go on their hen and stag nights but Neil invites only Fenner and slips something into his drink.
55	16	"Curtain Call"	Jim O'Hanlon	Ann McManus & Maureen Chadwick	13 June 2002	7.13
G-Wing's open day goes ahead – but not according to plan. Shaz and Denny have their interprison visit and Shaz has brought some mushrooms with her. Yvonne gets a male escort to visit her during the open day and finds out about Snowball's escape plan. Neil and the inmates' lives hang in the balance when Snowball's escape plan finally detonates. Note: final appearances of Shaz Wiley (Lindsey Fawcett), Cassie Tyler (Kellie Bright) and Roisin Connor (Siobhán McCarthy)

== Reception ==
=== Ratings ===
No.	Title	Air date	Timeslot	Weekly ratings		Ref(s)
No.	Title	Air date	Timeslot	Viewers	Rank	Ref(s)
1	Fight or Flight	28 February 2002	Thursday 9:00 pm	7,560,000	13	
2	Unholy Alliances	7 March 2002	Thursday 9:00 pm	6,830,000	17	
3	Behind Closed Doors	14 March 2002	Thursday 9:00 pm	7,300,000	15	
4	Fait Accompli	21 March 2002	Thursday 9:00 pm	7,330,000	12	
5	Only the Lonely	28 March 2002	Thursday 9:00 pm	6,820,000	15	
6	Sweet Sixteen	4 April 2002	Thursday 9:00 pm	6,990,000	16	
7	Pillow Talk	11 April 2002	Thursday 9:00 pm	6,920,000	17	
8	Prison Issue	18 April 2002	Thursday 9:00 pm	7,100,000	18	
9	Baby on Board	25 April 2002	Thursday 9:00 pm	7,120,000	14	
10	Family Matters	2 May 2002	Thursday 9:00 pm	6,900,000	11	
11	Battle Lines	9 May 2002	Thursday 9:00 pm	7,430,000	11	
12	Appearances Sake	16 May 2002	Thursday 9:00 pm	7,120,000	12	
13	True Colours	23 May 2002	Thursday 9:00 pm	7,350,000	12	
14	Hard Knock Life	30 May 2002	Thursday 9:00 pm	6,590,000	14	
15	Marriage of Inconvenience	6 June 2002	Thursday 9:00 pm	6,330,000	13	
16	Curtain Call	13 June 2002	Thursday 9:00 pm	7,130,000	13	

=== Awards and nominations ===
- National Television Awards (2002) – Most Popular Drama (Nominated)
- TV Quick Awards (2002) – Best Actress (Claire King) (Won)
- TV Quick Awards (2002) – Best Loved Drama (Won)
