= Bad Girls series 2 =

Bad Girls
- Season 2
- Re-release DVD
- Starring: Simone Lahbib; Claire King; Mandana Jones; Debra Stephenson; Jack Ellis
- No. of episodes: 13

Release
- Original network: ITV
- Original release: 4 April – 4 July 2000

Series chronology
- ← Previous; Series 1 Next → Series 3

The second series of Bad Girls began on ITV on 4 April 2000. The first episode, "Tug of Love", opened with 9.44 million viewers. The ninth episode of series two, "The Leaving", was the highest-rated episode of the entire run of the series between 1999 and 2006, with 9.49 million viewers. The second series ended on 4 July 2000; it consists of 13 episodes.

== Storylines ==
The second series picks up several weeks after the last. Helen Stewart is long overdue to return to work after taking leave, and Fenner is acting wing governor until her return. Shell and Fenner's affair reaches a head when he discovers Shell has been writing and phoning his wife and told her of their affair. Helen discovers Nikki is innocent of contacting Fenner's wife, as Shell originally had Fenner believing it was Nikki. Fenner attacks Shell for deceiving him, which causes conflict between Helen and Mr. Stubberfield, as Helen believes that Fenner did attack Shell. The conflict causes Helen to resign and brings her closer to Nikki, but she later returns to run the lifers' unit. New officer Karen Betts accepts the role of G-Wing governor. Zandra gives birth to a baby boy, but her happiness is short-lived as her ex fiancé, Robin, applies for custody and things get worse for her as she receives devastating news. Yvonne begins to do deals with Fenner; Denny gets in contact with her estranged mother, Jessie; and Julie Johnston discovers her kids are back in England, so she gets in touch with them.

== Cast ==
=== Main ===
- Simone Lahbib as Helen Stewart
- Claire King as Karen Betts
- Mandana Jones as Nikki Wade
- Debra Stephenson as Shell Dockley
- Jack Ellis as Jim Fenner
- Alicya Eyo as Denny Blood
- Joe Shaw as Dominic McAllister
- Lara Cazalet as Zandra Plackett
- Sharon Duncan Brewster as Crystal Gordon
- Linda Henry as Yvonne Atkins
- Isabelle Amyes as Barbara Hunt
- Lindsey Fawcett as Shaz Wylie
- Nathan Constance as Josh Mitchell
- Tracey Wilkinson as Di Barker
- Helen Fraser as Sylvia Hollamby
- Victoria Alcock as Julie Saunders
- Kika Mirylees as Julie Johnston

=== Recurring ===
- Philip McGough as Dr. Malcolm Nicholson
- Roland Oliver as Simon Stubberfield
- Kim Taylforth as Marilyn Fenner
- Alison Newman as Renee Williams
- Gideon Turner as Robin Dunstan
- Eugene Walker as Officer Blakeson
- Danielle King as Lauren Atkins
- Ivan Kaye as Charlie Atkins
- Geoffrey Hutchings as Bobby Hollamby
- Denise Black as Jessie Devlin
- Helen Schlesinger as Tessa Spall
- Jade Williams as Rhiannon Dawson

=== Guest ===
- Ruth Mitchell as Midwife
- Melanie Ramsey as Mel
- Matthew Thomas as Tom Fenner
- Frederick Warder as D.I. Williamson
- Scott Charles as Martin Dawson
- Emily Fairman as Nurse
- Nick Barnes as Security Guard
- Andy Hough as Billy
- Sian Webber as Meg Richards
- Daniel James as Personal Trainer
- Julie Legrand as Rita Dockley
- David Case as Chaplain
- Rod Culbertson as John
- Celia Robertson as D C Greer
- Jason Heatherington as D S Sullivan
- Danielle Lydon as Claire Walker
- Jennifer Luckraft as Janine
- Elizabeth Bradley as Mrs. Foster

== Episodes ==
No. overall	No. in series	Title	Directed by	Written by	Original release date	UK viewers (millions)
11	1	"Tug of Love"	Mike Adams	Maureen Chadwick	4 April 2000	9.44
Zandra has her baby and goes to desperate lengths to keep him when she fights with another mother, who is pushing drugs. Helen returns just as Fenner is getting comfortable as G-Wing Governor but it gets worse as Shell phones Fenner's wife and tells her exactly what he has been up to. Note: first appearance of Karen Betts (Claire King)
12	2	"Shit Happens"	Mike Adams	Martin Allen	11 April 2000	8.53
New officer Karen Betts starts at Larkhall and reveals that she and Fenner have history. Helen is torn between duty and desire as she battles to hide her true feelings from Nikki, when she has no option but to transfer her to another prison after she slaps Dominic. Fenner discovers Shell's deceit and his anger knows no bounds but his wife wants him gone.
13	3	"Visiting Time"	Laurence Moody	Mark Wadlow	18 April 2000	8.21
Julie J discovers that her children are back in England but Hollamby spoils the reunion party. Karen is given the cold shoulder by some officers for reporting Fenner's attack on Shell and Karen takes over as Wing Governor and shows him how unsentimental she can be. Note: first appearance of Di Barker (Tracey Wilkinson)
14	4	"Looking For Love"	Laurence Moody	Jayne Hoillinson	25 April 2000	8.12
New officer Di Barker arrives from D-Wing as Jim's replacement. Denny gets the chance to visit her mum on the outside and her dreams for their future are shattered and Yvonne is left to comfort her. Sylvia helps Jim clear his name and he returns to G Wing with Shell thinking they will get back together, but for now it's no more Mr. Nice Guy. Yvonne and Fenner make a deal.
15	5	"Mistaken Identity"	Laurence Moody	Maureen Chadwick	2 May 2000	8.26
Mad Tessa, a nightmare from the past, returns to haunt Karen, and only Fenner can save her. New inmate Barbara Hunt goes through hell in a case of mistaken identity. Zandra complains of headaches and collapses, only Crystal believes it is not drug related. Yvonne keeps up her end of the bargain, but does Fenner? Note: first appearance of Barbara Hunt (Isabelle Amyes)
16	6	"Losing It"	Jim O'Hanlon	Martin Allen	9 May 2000	7.70
Shell starts to crack and makes allegations against all the male officers causing all the women to join in, she starts to bully Barbara. The Julies make it happen for Josh and Crystal. Karen punishes Hollamby with a harsh fitness regime. Nikki gets a visit from Helen.
17	7	"The Set-Up"	Jim O'Hanlon	Phil Ford	16 May 2000	9.30
Yvonne's daughter arrives with tragic news about her father, but she is not pretending. Fenner thwarts Yvonne's escape attempt in the nick of time. Helen's new role gives her the opportunity to re-open Nikki's case. Zandra's illness is finally – and tragically – diagnosed.
18	8	"Babes Behind Bars"	Jim O'Hanlon	Maureen Chadwick	23 May 2000	8.98
Crystal risks losing Josh to stay in prison with Zandra. Babs and Nikki grow marijuana to cure Zandra's pain. Shell confronts her mother about her past abuse. Yvonne launches her new money making scheme.
19	9	"The Leaving"	Mike Adams	Jayne Hoillinson	30 May 2000	9.49
The women mourn the loss of a true friend and Denny falls for the new arrival, Shaz Wylie. Shell bites off more than she can chew when she takes on Barbara, resulting in a broken wrist. Note: final appearance of Zandra Plackett (Lara Cazalet); first appearance of Shaz Wylie (Lindsey Fawcett)
20	10	"Family Plan"	Mike Adams	Phil Ford	6 June 2000	9.24
Shell doesn't want anyone to know who broke her wrist. Shaz and Denny cause havoc on the wing with some on Shaz's tricks. Yvonne's deadly rival, Renee Williams turns up on G-Wing, armed with a blade. The Two Julies' madcap plan to have a baby goes yoghurt-pot up.
21	11	"Rough Justice"	Mike Adams	Ann McManus	13 June 2000	9.13
Renee attacks Yvonne in the bathroom but Nikki saves Yvonne before she does any real damage. Crystal, Shell, Denny, Shaz, Yvonne, Nikki and the Julies have all witnessed Renee's methods of dealing with people so everyone is a suspect when Renee bites the dust. Helen has some fantastic news for Nikki. Fenner's wife frees him to pursue Karen.
22	12	"Facing Up"	Laurence Moody	Ann McManus	27 June 2000	8.50
After meeting the widow of one of her victims, Shaz is forced to face the consequences of her crime. Nikki's jealousy destroys her relationship with Helen and she harms herself while gardening. Karen comes to visit Fenner and they grow closer.
23	13	"Oh What a Night!"	Laurence Moody	Ann McManus & Maureen Chadwick	4 July 2000	8.81
Yvonne is left heartbroken when Charlie leaves her. Nikki risks it all for one night with Helen. Jim blows it with Karen and ends up at Shell's mercy. Hollamby has an 'ecstatic' anniversary party thanks to an illegal gift from the girls on G-Wing. Crystal is released but Josh is not waiting at the gate. Note: final appearance of Dominic McAllister (Joe Shaw)

== Reception ==
=== Ratings ===
No.	Title	Air date	Timeslot	Weekly ratings		Ref(s)
No.	Title	Air date	Timeslot	Viewers	Rank	Ref(s)
1	"Tug of Love"	4 April 2000	Tuesday 9:00 pm	9,440,000	14	
2	"Shit Happens"	11 April 2000	Tuesday 9:00 pm	8,530,000	13	
3	"Visiting Time"	18 April 2000	Tuesday 9:00 pm	8,210,000	11	
4	"Looking for Love"	25 April 2000	Tuesday 9:00 pm	8,120,000	12	
5	"Mistaken Identity"	2 May 2000	Tuesday 9:00 pm	8,260,000	16	
6	"Losing It"	9 May 2000	Tuesday 9:00 pm	7,700,000	11	
7	"The Set-Up"	16 May 2000	Tuesday 9:00 pm	9,300,000	11	
8	"Babes Behind Bars"	23 May 2000	Tuesday 9:00 pm	8,980,000	8	
9	"The Leaving"	30 May 2000	Tuesday 9:00 pm	9,490,000	9	
10	"Family Plan"	6 June 2000	Tuesday 9:00 pm	9,240,000	10	
11	"Rough Justice"	13 June 2000	Tuesday 9:00 pm	9,130,000	8	
12	"Facing Up"	27 June 2000	Tuesday 9:00 pm	8,500,000	8	
13	"Oh What a Night"	4 July 2000	Tuesday 9:00 pm	8,810,000	10	

=== Awards and nominations ===
- National Television Awards (2000) – Most Popular Actress (Debra Stephenson – Nominated)
- National Television Awards (2000) – Most Popular Drama (Won)
- TV Quick Awards (2000) – Best Loved Drama (Won)

== Release ==
Original UK DVD

The second series of Bad Girls was originally released in the UK on VHS in four volumes. The DVD was released in the UK on 1 October 2001. It was re-released on 7 February 2011 in brand new packaging. On the same day it was released in a boxset along with series one. On 9 October 2006, it was released as part of a series one-four boxset.

In Australia, series two was released on 26 May 2003 in the same cover packaging as the UK. The second release for series two was in the complete series one-eight boxset - "The Complete Collection", which was released on 10 November 2010. It was also released as a separate edition from the complete boxset on 12 January 2011.

Bad Girls: Series Two
Set Details		Special Features
13 Episodes; 4-disc set; 4:3 Aspect Ratio; 16:9 Aspect Ratio (re-release); Subtitles: No; English (Stereo)		Gallery One: Behind the Scenes; Gallery Two: The National TV Awards; Bad Girls in South Africa: Simone and Mandana's Trailers - Uncut; Bad Girls in South Africa: Documentary; Outtakes; Deleted Scenes; Producer Biographies
Release dates		Gallery One: Behind the Scenes; Gallery Two: The National TV Awards; Bad Girls in South Africa: Simone and Mandana's Trailers - Uncut; Bad Girls in South Africa: Documentary; Outtakes; Deleted Scenes; Producer Biographies
United Kingdom	Australia	Gallery One: Behind the Scenes; Gallery Two: The National TV Awards; Bad Girls in South Africa: Simone and Mandana's Trailers - Uncut; Bad Girls in South Africa: Documentary; Outtakes; Deleted Scenes; Producer Biographies
1 October 2001; 7 February 2011 (re-release)	26 May 2003; 12 January 2011 (re-release)	Gallery One: Behind the Scenes; Gallery Two: The National TV Awards; Bad Girls in South Africa: Simone and Mandana's Trailers - Uncut; Bad Girls in South Africa: Documentary; Outtakes; Deleted Scenes; Producer Biographies
