= Yvonne Atkins =

Fictional character from Bad Girls

- 'Bad Girls' character
- Portrayed by: Linda Henry
- Duration: Series 1–5
- First appearance: "Payback Time" (#1.09)
- Last appearance: "Series 5, Episode 16"
- Created by: Maureen Chadwick; Ann McManus
In-universe information
- Occupation: Gangster, Top Dog of G-Wing at HMP Larkhall (2001–2004)
- Spouse: Charlie Atkins (1981–2000)
- Sons: Ritchie Atkins
- Daughters: Lauren Atkins

Yvonne Atkins is a fictional character from the British prison drama series Bad Girls, portrayed by Linda Henry. The character Yvonne first appeared in the finale episode of Series 1. She played a prominent role in Series 2, 3, 4 and 5 as Top Dog of G-Wing, until she was murdered by Jim Fenner (Jack Ellis) in the last episode of Series 5.

== Character description ==
Atkins' character was often described in the media as "moody". The People called her a "tough...'prison godmother'", while Daily Record described one episode in which "Linda Henry spends a fair amount of her time swaggering about the place looking like a bulldog chewing a wasp."

== Storylines ==
=== Series 1 ===
Yvonne received four years for conspiracy to commit murder after she hired a hit-man to kill a business rival of her husband Charlie, a London gangster. Upon entering Larkhall, she does her best to wind up Sylvia Hollamby (Helen Fraser) by using her smarts and her connections on the outside. She promptly becomes Top Dog of G-Wing, but doesn't seem to abuse her power maliciously. She helps protect other inmates from the bullying tendencies of Shell Dockley (Debra Stephenson) and others.

=== Series 2 ===
Yvonne starts a sex hotline called "Babes Behind Bars" until it is eventually found out by the prison officers. Later, Yvonne's arch-rival, Renee Williams (Alison Newman), arrives on G-Wing. She sets about bullying and intimidating the other prisoners, and racially abuses black inmates and officers on the wing. She reveals to Yvonne that she had been sleeping with her husband, Charlie, before she got sent to prison, and later tries to attack her in the toilets with a razor blade, but Nikki Wade steps in to help. Renee is eating dinner one day and suddenly; she stops eating, starts wheezing, her face quickly turning red. She falls to the floor, clutching her throat and gasping for breath, but she expires too quickly for the officers to help. It had previously been revealed to the viewers that Yvonne had put crushed peanuts into a pepper-shaker, which caused anaphylactic shock.

Yvonne later manages to get out of the prison for a day accompanied by Jim Fenner (Jack Ellis) and Sylvia. She pretends she needs to go to the toilet, so they take her into a pub to use their facilities. Here she tries to escape through a window, but Fenner stops her, after reading in the newspaper that Yvonne's husband Charlie had been arrested. Much later on, her estranged husband is assassinated outside of court, after the jury claim he is innocent, though in fact, there was pressure on the jury to make that decision. Yvonne learns that it was her daughter Lauren who organised the hit, in revenge for his infidelity.

=== Series 3 ===
Yvonne finds herself defending the young inmate Shaz Wiley (Lindsey Fawcett), who is left lonely and vulnerable after her girlfriend Denny Blood (Alicya Eyo) escapes from Larkhall with Shell. She is being bullied by the recently arrived Peckham Boot Gang, consisting of Maxi Purvis (Kerry Norton), Tina O'Kane (Victoria Bush) and Al McKenzie (Pauline Campbell). They get Shaz's friend Buki Lester (Kim Oliver) in on their plan, and have her lure Shaz into a trap by inviting her to a "party" in the laundry room. Shaz agrees to go, unaware that there is no party and she is being tricked into meeting up with violent bully Al McKenzie, who intends to attack her. Yvonne gets wind of the plan, however, and surprises Al by showing up in place of Shaz. Al attempts to attack Yvonne, but finds herself grossly outmatched. Yvonne beats her up and warns her off; which intensifies the feud between herself and the Peckham Boot Gang.

Yvonne also discovers Fenner is running brothels for wealthy madame Virginia O'Kane (Kate O'Mara) while she is in prison. She informs former Wing Governor Helen Stewart (Simone Lahbib), who has recently been sexually assaulted by Fenner, and of this; Helen sets out to gather evidence to bring Fenner down for good. Yvonne's involvement in this plot leads to a further feud between her and Fenner, who is also having an affair with Maxi, and conspiring with her to bring Yvonne down and instate Maxi as Top Dog. After G-Wing celebrates Nikki Wade's (Mandana Jones) successful appeal, Yvonne asks prison officer Di Barker (Tracey Wilkinson) for permission to take a bath. Virginia decides to go with her, but Di does not escort them. Whilst Yvonne listens to music on her headphones whilst in the bath, Virginia is drowned by an unseen assailant. Yvonne finds her body and becomes the prime suspect, believing Fenner has set her up.

=== Series 4 ===
Yvonne pleads innocent for the murder of Virginia, but the authorities refuse to believe she is innocent. Yvonne manages to cause a power cut, and uses this time to escape, she is almost over the wall when Fenner spots her, he and Karen Betts (Claire King) manage to stop her, and this makes Betts believe Yvonne is guilty of Virginia's murder. When Fenner is promoted to Wing Governor, Maxi - who he is now sleeping with - admits she and Al murdered Virginia and framed Yvonne, when she starts blackmailing Fenner about their affair, Fenner actually teams up with Yvonne and tells her the truth about what really happened to Virginia. When Yvonne's friend Denny returns to G-Wing, she helps them by seducing Al and recording her confession of Virginia's murder. When the truth about Virginia’s murder is revealed, Maxi and Yvonne fight on a table. They fall on the floor and Maxi briefly strangles Yvonne and Yvonne punches Maxi in the face. Tina Purvis then breaks up the fight by attacking Maxi for killing Virginia. Yvonne makes a new enemy of Snowball Merriman (Nicole Faraday), who is actually in a relationship with Yvonne's son Ritchie. Snowball is planning to escape by setting off a bomb in the prison, which results in tragedy for the prisoners, however she is caught at the gate and Fenner allows Yvonne into Snowball's cell, allowing her to "teach her a lesson".

=== Series 5 ===
After Denny's girlfriend, Shaz, died in the fire, as a result of Snowball's escape plan, Yvonne "adopts" her as a daughter, and Denny begins calling her "mum". Snowball attempts another escape, taken Karen hostage, she attempts to shoot her, but accidentally shoots Ritchie, paralyzing him. When Ritchie tells Yvonne how much he still loves Snowball, Yvonne reluctantly begins protecting her from the other inmates. Ritchie and Snowball later make a suicide pact; Ritchie dies but Snowball doesn't. A devastated Yvonne is told to still look after Snowball in case she tries to kill herself again, but Yvonne creates a diversion and allows Snowball to hang herself in front of everyone. She later begins a relationship with prison officer Colin Hedges (Tristan Surrock), who she is aware is a heroin user.

==== Murder ====
Yvonne and Fenner reignite their feud, culminating in each attempting to murder the other. Fenner manages to avoid being killed by the hitman Yvonne had hired and, knowing her days are numbered, Yvonne decides to escape for a third time. New inmate Kris Yates (Jennifer Ness) had earlier shown Yvonne a map of the prison, revealing a disused underground hanging cell with an attached tunnel which could lead them to freedom. Yvonne initially rejects the escape plan, but later decides to take Kris up on her offer. On the day of Barbara "Babs" Hunt's (Isabelle Amyes) wedding in the prison chapel, Yvonne makes her escape. Fenner had earlier attacked Kris and had her sent down the block, falsely claiming she attacked him. He had also discovered that Hedges knew of Yvonne's escape plan and forced him to confess the details. Fenner goes down to the hanging cell and sees that behind a cell door, the escape tunnel has been blocked off. When Yvonne enters the tunnel through the door, Fenner appears. He closes and locks the door behind her, with the last words "bye bye Atkins, don't bother screaming, you might wanna save on the oxygen.

==== Aftermath ====
Series 6 starts off six weeks later, when Kris eventually makes her way down to the hanging cell to escape. She is horrified to discover Yvonne's decomposing corpse, after dropping her keys and telling her girlfriend, prison officer Selena Geeson (Charlotte Lucas) about Yvonne, Selena goes down to retrieve the keys and tell Governing Governor Neil Grayling (James Gaddas) that she has found Yvonne. The prisoners are heartbroken when they discover how Yvonne died. Suspicion falls on Fenner, but he is never charged, he begins having nightmares about Yvonne, and later goes onto G Wing naked screaming he is innocent, Julie Saunders (Victoria Alcock) takes Yvonne's death the worst and constantly threatens Fenner. Throughout Series 7, Fenner is once again promoted to Wing Governor. He marries Di and after punching her, he threatens to kill her just like he killed Yvonne. Di is terrified and tells the Julies about it and on the day of Yvonne's anniversary, they request a memorial service to be held in the hanging cell for her. Julie S plans to kill Fenner down there, however Fenner has made so many enemies now, she is not the only one who wants him dead. Down in the hanging cell, Julie Johnston (Kika Mirylees) stabs Fenner through the throat with an icicle, causing him to drop next to the tunnel he locked Yvonne in and die. As Fenner dies, the voice of Yvonne shouting for him to let her out from the day he locked her in the hanging cell is heard along with the gurgling sounds he makes as he bleeds to death.
