= Sylvia Hollamby =

- Bad Girls character
- Portrayed by: Helen Fraser
- Duration: Series 1–8
- First appearance: "Them and Us" (#1.1)
- Last appearance: "Christmas Special" (#8.11)
- Created by: Maureen Chadwick; Ann McManus
In-universe information
- Other names: BodyBag, Sylvia Nicholson
- Occupation: Senior Prison Officer (1999–2000; 2001–2006); Basic Grade Prison Officer (2000); Acting Wing Governor (2002; 2006); Acting Governing Governor (2006)
- Spouse: Bobby Hollamby (1970–2003; his death); Malcolm Nicholson (2005; his death)
- Sons: Bobby Darren
- Daughters: Constance; Gail
- Grandchildren: Unnamed (off screen)

Sylvia Violet Hollamby (previously Nicholson; often referred to as BodyBag by the prisoners) is one of the longest-running characters in the award-winning prison drama series Bad Girls. Portrayed by Helen Fraser from the first episode in 1999 until the last in 2006, Hollamby was the longest-serving prison officer on the show with convicts Julie Johnston and Julie Saunders (Kika Mirylees and Victoria Alcock) being the only other characters to remain for all eight series.

== Personality ==
While Sylvia is usually the most law-abiding of the generally corrupt prison staff, she is racist and intolerant of homosexuality. She constantly complains about her job and is usually most happy if sitting down with a cup of tea or reading a magazine rather than working.

She hates almost all of the wing governors, usually the younger female ones, with her friend Jim Fenner being her favourite choice to hold the position. She hates all of the prisoners and treats them with contempt, regardless of how severe or tame their crime had been, apart from very rare occasions when she has been somewhat sympathetic towards them; she believes that "happiness is door shaped", showing her view that all prisoners should be on 24-hour lockdown, thus making life easier for the officers and especially her. She also believes that there should be closed visits, thus curtailing the drug problems that constantly blight prisons including Larkhall. She is not a fan of the "touchy feely prison warding" that was a feature of the progressive policies unsuccessfully implemented by governors such as Grayling; in her mind, "a con is a con is a con and they don't get any special treatment". Unsurprisingly, three attempts were made on her life: the prisoners pushing her down the stairs in series 2, Shell Dockley and Denny Blood almost burning her and her first husband, Bobby, and her second husband, Dr Malcolm Nicholson, attempting to kill her on their honeymoon. Despite her hostility towards the prisoners, two escaped inmates Bev Tull (Amanda Barrie) and Phyl Oswyn (Stephanie Beacham) saved her from being murdered by Dr Nicholson (Philip McGough).

== Storylines ==
=== Series 1 ===
In the first episode, she is first seen ignoring a pregnant prisoner who is suffering a miscarriage. She despises all the prisoners and is extremely harsh on all the new arrivals. She orders a violent strip search to be placed on Nikki Wade (Mandana Jones). She can't stand religious prisoner Crystal Gordan's constant guitar playing and singing. She is happy when the prisoners are forced to have closed visits. She mocks Rachel Hicks when she is sent to the 4-bed dorm with Denny, who is bullying her. She also makes digs at posh Monica Lyndsey, making derogatory references to her affluent background.

=== Series 2 ===
She is in trouble with Governor Karen Betts (Claire King) after she places a mental patient, "Mad" Tessa Spall (Helen Schlesinger), onto G-Wing, believing her to be Barbara "Babs" Hunt (Isabelle Amyes), whom she sends to the psychiatric unit, which the prisoners refer to as the "muppet wing". As punishment, Karen forces her to take on a strict fitness regime in the prison grounds; the prisoners ridicule her over this. When she discovers Julie Johnston is illegally receiving a visit from her children – after her husband got a court order preventing her from seeing them – she terminates the visit leaving Julie devastated. The prisoners decide that they have had enough of Sylvia's abuse of her authority and push her down the stairs. Sylvia is demoted from Senior Prison Officer to Prison Officer, because she allows Shaz Wiley (Lindsey Fawcett) and Denny Blood (Alicya Eyo) to lock her in their cell and enter the canteen kitchen. She and her husband, Bobby, (Geoffrey Hutchings) later celebrate their 30th wedding anniversary in the Prison Officers' Club, where a drink spiked with ecstasy causes her to reveal her true feelings to him. Later that night, her close friend Jim Fenner (Jack Ellis) is stabbed in the stomach by Shell Dockley (Debra Stephenson).

=== Series 3 ===
Sylvia is determined to make Shell pay for nearly killing Fenner. She is furious when Shell is allowed back on G-Wing, so has her transferred to the mental health wing. She makes Shell share a cell with "Mad" Tessa; however, Tessa appears to become infatuated by Shell. When Sylvia sees her plan is not working, she tells another mental patient, "Podger" Pam (Wendi Peters), that Shell has stolen her medication and then lets Pam into the shower where Shell is. Pam brutally beats up Shell, while a delighted Sylvia looks on.

Fenner eventually helps Shell escape, along with Denny and her girlfriend, Shaz; however they lose Shaz, who is subsequently caught and returned to prison. Shell and Denny wear wigs to conceal their identities and break into the Hollamby residence. When Sylvia returns home, they take her hostage and force her to dress as a French maid and serve them cocaine on a tray. When her undertaker husband returns home, they take him hostage, too. They also take some of the Hollambys' money and Shell wrecks Sylvia's priceless ornaments, before Sylvia tries to explain to them that what she does is just a job and that she doesn't really enjoy tormenting the prisoners. Shell and Denny laugh hysterically at this, knowing that Sylvia loves her authority and, that night, they tie Bobby and Sylvia up. The next morning, when Shell discovers Bobby has tried to break free, she places him in a coffin in their garage, and forces Sylvia to nail the coffin shut and then pours petrol over it. After tying Sylvia to the garage door, Shell sets the coffin on fire. As the police arrive, Shell and Denny make a run for it in Bobby's hearse and leave to go to Spain with false passports. After Sylvia eventually returns to work, she receives a phone call from Shell, impersonating a mattress saleswoman, and asks Sylvia if her husband would prefer to sleep in a black coffin instead. Sylvia becomes terrified, as she realises Shell is on the other end of the phone. The call is traced and Shell and Denny are arrested on a boat; however, they make one last escape and jump into the sea, being presumed dead afterwards.

=== Series 4 ===
Sylvia is overjoyed when she discovers Denny and Shell were never found in the sea, and believed to be dead; she and Bobby holiday in the same place where they "died". Much to her horror, Denny is found alive and extradited back to G-Wing. Sylvia is less afraid of Denny, and warns her she will get revenge on her and that she will wish she was as "dead as Dockley". Sylvia is briefly promoted to Wing Governor, and, on the day when inspectors arrive at Larkhall, she discovers Maxi Purvis (Kerry Norton) dead; not wanting the inspectors to see, she hides the body in the prison chapel, but it is later discovered. Although Al McKenzie (Pauline Campbell) helped Maxi kill herself by giving her toilet roll to choke herself on, Maxi's enemy Shaz becomes a suspect. Sylvia immediately has her transferred to another prison; however, she has done this as more of a punishment for Shaz's girlfriend, Denny. Denny runs to attack Sylvia and is sent down the block; Sylvia then throws toilet roll at her and tells her to do the same as Maxi.

=== Series 5 ===
Sylvia's worst fears become reality, as Shell is found alive and heavily pregnant in Amsterdam; she is extradited back to G-Wing. Things go from bad to worse when she discovers Bobby is badly in financial debt. Bobby commits suicide by gassing himself in his own hearse. Two new inmates, Bev Tull and Phyl Oswyn – who have tricked Denny into believing Bev is a medium and has contacted her dead girlfriend, Shaz – trick Sylvia into thinking they can contact Bobby, as long as she pays them with gin. Sylvia later develops feelings for the Rev. Henry Mills (Michael Elwyn); however, Henry falls in love with prisoner Babs Hunt, who is due for release. Henry and Babs get married in the prison chapel on Babs' last day inside.

=== Series 6 ===
Sylvia constantly makes racist remarks about Jamaican prisoner Darlene Cake (Antonia Okonma). When new Wing Governor Frances Myers (Eva Pope) discovers this, she forces Sylvia to make a public apology to Darlene in front of the other prisoners; this, once again, makes Sylvia a laughing stock. When Frances sparks a war with Phyl over drugs, Sylvia is forced to take Phyl's breakfast to her. Phyl is infuriated to discover that her meals will be reduced to bread and water from now on, so throws the glass of water in Sylvia's face. She then tells Sylvia she wants to speak to Frances. Sylvia then develops feelings for Dr. Malcolm Nicholson; at the wedding of Fenner and Di Barker (Tracey Wilkinson), she catches the bouquet and asks Nicholson if he believes in fate.

=== Series 7 ===
Sylvia finally gets some good news when she discovers that her Aunt Margaret has died and left her a palatial, antique-stuffed house in Hampstead in her will. Nicholson hears about this and pretends to reciprocate her feelings for him. They later get married, and honeymoon on the Costa del Sol, unaware that Phyl and Bev, who recently escaped from Larkhall are staying in the hotel room next door. Nicholson ties her up and attempts to inject her with an empty syringe thus creating an air bubble and bringing on an embolism. Phyl and Bev, despite their hatred towards her, save her, and Phyl shoots Nicholson dead while describing him as a "loathsome little man". After the murder, Bev and Phyl are on their way out of the hotel with the diamonds they found with the gun that Phyl killed Nicholson with. Just as they are about to exit the hotel, Sylvia appears on the balcony screaming, leading to a startled Bev to drop the diamonds, and she is violently arrested. Phyl, however, escapes. A few weeks later, Phyl is captured again and is sent back to Larkhall. Following both Bev and Phyl's returns, Sylvia pays them both back with a bottle of gin each.

That Christmas, the new Governing Governor of Larkhall, Joy Masterton (Ellie Haddington), orders all the staff to come to work in fancy dress. Sylvia comes to work as Florence Nightingale. Joy then orders Sylvia to take Phyl down to the cellar to fix the boiler and generator, as they are not working. There, Sylvia thanks Phyl yet again for saving her from Nicholson's evil clutches. They encounter dozens of rats, and, while in the room with the boiler, Sylvia suffers a panic attack after finding a rat underneath her dress. She subsequently falls down the steps to the cellar, knocking herself unconscious and blocking the door, leaving Phyl trapped. After the boiler and generator are fixed, the flickering lights force Sylvia to come round and let Phyl out of the room. When they return indoors from the freezing cold snow storm outside, Joy then gives Sylvia orders to find Chaplain Christy Mackay (Gaynor Howe), who has been murdered in the shower by new inmate Miranda Miles (Nicola Redmond). Sylvia's screams alert the entire prison, leading to Joy and Kevin Spiers (Andrew Scarborough) to investigate. Following this, Miranda is sent to a psychiatric hospital.

=== Series 8 ===
Sylvia has been promoted once again to Wing Governor. As Christmas approaches, she keeps the women locked in their cells, making them hate her even further. She also disapproves of her openly homosexual son Bobby Darren's relationship with a man, which causes a further rift between her and her son. She is unaware that evil inmate Natalie Buxton (Dannielle Brent) was recently killed and her body dumped in the prison sewers. She suffers a Scrooge-like dream when the ghost of Natalie appears to her and shows her that she is just as hated as she was; she shows Sylvia how happy everyone, including her son, would be after hearing she was dead, she then takes Sylvia down to the sewers, where her own decomposing corpse is, but the corpse Sylvia sees is that of herself. She later makes peace with her son and gives the prisoners a happy Christmas, but tells them not to get too used to her good nature, as it's "business as usual" tomorrow. She then dances with her son and the inmates. This was the last episode.

== Reception ==
Sylvia has become one of the most popular characters on the show, and, despite the character's bigoted views, she has become somewhat of a gay icon. The last ever episode centred on the character as the longest-serving officer.
