= Jim Fenner =

Fictional character from the British TV series Bad Girls

- Bad Girls character
- Portrayed by: Jack Ellis
- Duration: Series 1–7
- First appearance: "Them and Us" (#1.1)
- Last appearance: "Series 7, episode 13"
- Created by: Maureen Chadwick; Ann McManus
In-universe information
- Other names: John Farmer
- Occupation: Principal Officer; Wing Governor; Acting Governing Governor
- Spouse: Marilyn Fenner (1988–2000); Di Barker (2004–2005, his death)
- Children: Becky Fenner (daughter); Tom Fenner (son)

James Graham "Jim" Fenner is a fictional character in the British television series Bad Girls, portrayed by Jack Ellis. The character was a prominent feature on the show for seven series, and played the role of a prison officer, temporary prison governor and a villainous figure who schemed and made life for inmates difficult. He was at one point imprisoned for death by dangerous driving but was released when his wife, Di Barker (Tracey Wilkinson), falsified evidence to clear his name. He returned to his job at Larkhall as G-Wing Governor, and shortly before his death was promoted to Acting Governing Governor. Ellis left Bad Girls at the end of the seventh series when his character was murdered by inmate Julie Johnston (Kika Mirylees).

== Casting ==
In 1999, Ellis accepted the role of Jim without needing to look at the scripts. The actor told Yvonne Swann of the Daily Mirror that he had been in debt and welcomed the role. He added that "it certainly put my name on the map" as an actor.

Debra Stephenson who plays inmate Shell Dockley, told reporters from the Daily Mirror that her character would begin a "lusty affair" with Jim. Jim begins a feud with Governor Helen Stewart (Simone Lahbib). In 2001, Lahbib told Billy Sloan of the Sunday Mail that she loved playing the scenes in which Helen spars with "bad boy" Jim. Jim played a role in the second series cliff-hanger storyline, in which Shell attempts to stab him with a glass bottle. Stephenson told the Mirror's Karen Hockney that her character's relationship with Jim had ended and she tries to get revenge in "typical Shell style". She added that since the second series ended, all that anyone asked her was whether or not Shell succeeds in murdering Jim. Mario McMullen from the Coventry Telegraph reported that viewers would have to wait until the opening episode of the following series to discover Jim's fate. When the episode aired Shell manages to stab Jim. In February 2001, Ellis revealed that another character would "wipe the smile" off Jim's face in the third series.

In one storyline Neil Grayling (James Gaddas) drugs Jim in an attempt to seduce him. Ellis told Steve Hendry from the Sunday Mail that he enjoyed playing the story because it gave him the chance to be funny. He explained that it was a departure from his character's "brooding nasty presence". Jim is a "predatory character" but the situation changes and he is the victim. The scenes have a dark tone to them and are not quite politically correct. Ellis quipped "it couldn't happen to a nicer guy". Jim deals with Neil's advances by sexually assaulting his ex-fiancée Karen Betts (Claire King).

== Storylines ==
Fenner is initially introduced to the series as a Principal Officer, ranking him above both Senior and prison officers. During Neil Grayling's (James Gaddas) reign as Larkhall's 43rd Governing Governor, Fenner is promoted to Governor of G-Wing making him 43rd in a line of 42 others. During Series 4, Fenner finds himself the subject of (unwanted) sexual advances from Neil; after Fenner succeeds in having Neil fired, he takes over as The 40th Acting Governing Governor of Larkhall, putting him in charge of the entire prison. True to form, Fenner abuses the power granted to him in his new position and uses it to further his own ends, rather than to assist with the rehabilitation of inmates.

His main enemy within Larkhall was Yvonne Atkins (Linda Henry). Fenner continually attempts to use his authority to punish Yvonne for various "rule-breaking", although she is often not at fault. In turn, Yvonne would use the respect she had earned among the inmates to work against Fenner. Eventually, it becomes clear that Yvonne and Fenner couldn't co-exist within Larkhall for much longer and Yvonne arranged for a hitman to dispatch him. Unfortunately for her this was unsuccessful – due to a tip off from officer Colin Hedges (Tristan Sturrock) – and ultimately, Yvonne and Fenner's long "contest" of one-upmanship culminates in Fenner locking Yvonne in a disused hanging cell on a redundant wing at the prison. During the first episode of Series 6, inmate Kris Yates (Jennifer Ness) discovers Yvonne's decomposing corpse.

Fenner is murdered in the same hanging cell where Yvonne died. He was beginning to feel the effects of a couple of previous assassination attempts from inmates and staff. Julie Saunders (Victoria Alcock) poisoned some candles using Chlorine, Neil spiked his drink during his farewell party, Tina O'Kane (Victoria Bush) appeared to give him a poisoned cheese straw during that same party, Darlene Cake (Antonia Okonma) and Janine Nebeski (Nicola Stapleton) used a crude blowpipe to fire a poisoned thorn at him. However, none of these methods succeeded in their purpose and Fenner clambers to the doorway of the hanging cell, where he is met by Julie Johnston (Kika Mirylees), who stabs him in the throat with an icicle. He dies in front of the hanging cell where he murdered Yvonne.

== Other appearances ==
Jim features in stage version of the drama. The series' creative team Maureen Chadwick and Ann McManus devised the piece, which had been planned for four years. The musical was first performed in 2006 at the West Yorkshire Playhouse in Leeds.

== Reception ==
For his portrayal of Jim, Ellis was awarded "Best Actor" at the 2004 TV Quick Awards. Tony Purnell of the Daily Mirror said that Jim "turned out to be the chief screw in more ways than one". Purnell later bemoaned the storyline in which Shell tries to get "sadistic" Jim fired, he questioned if anyone knew or cared about the plot. Purnell later said that he hoped Jim would die after being stabbed by Shell. Tim Randall of the Daily Record said that the aftermath of the stabbing made for intense action. The Sunday Mail's Hendry said that "Mr. nasty" Jim was the biggest villain on television. The character was voted one of Channel 4's "top 10 TV Bastards".

John Russell of The People said that Jim was "a screw evidently determined to live up to his job description, who lurches from one ludicrous scene to another." He added that "grim Jim" shared a torrid affair with Shell behind the back of his "witless wife" while having "all the sexual appeal of a sinus wash". On Ellis' portrayal, Russell added that he "just glowers in all directions and invites you to select whatever emotion you think he might be experiencing. If that is proper acting, I'm David Beckham." A columnist for the Daily Record observed Jim as becoming "hell-bent on self-descruction" and digging himself into a hole. He opined that his greed and hunger for power could lead to his downfall.
