= List of Bad Girls characters =

== Overview ==
Character	Actor	Series							
Character	Actor	1	2	3	4	5	6	7	8
Sylvia Hollamby	Helen Fraser	Main	Main	Main	Main	Main	Main	Main	Main
Julie Johnston	Kika Mirylees	Main	Main	Main	Main	Main	Main	Main	Main
Julie Saunders	Victoria Alcock	Main	Main	Main	Main	Main	Main	Main	Main
Jim Fenner	Jack Ellis	Main	Main	Main	Main	Main	Main	Main	
Daniella "Denny" Blood	Alicya Eyo	Main	Main	Main	Main	Main			
Crystal Gordon	Sharon Duncan-Brewster	Main (Note: Sharon Duncan-Brewster left in the fourteenth episode of series four.)	Main	Main	Main				
Michelle "Shell" Dockley	Debra Stephenson	Main	Main	Main		Guest			
Helen Stewart	Simone Lahbib	Main	Main	Main					
Nikki Wade	Mandana Jones	Main	Main	Main					
Dominic McAllister	Joe Shaw	Main	Main						
Zandra Plackett	Lara Cazalet	Main (Note: Lara Cazalet joined in the second episode of series one and left in the ninth episode of series two.)	Main						
Monica Lindsay	Jane Lowe	Main (Note: Jane Lowe joined in the second episode of series one.)		Guest					
Lorna Rose	Luisa Bradshaw-White	Main (Note: Luisa Bradshaw-White left in the ninth episode of series one.)							
Rachel Hicks	Joanne Froggatt	Main (Note: Joanne Froggatt left in the fourth episode of series one.)							
Yvonne Atkins	Linda Henry	Recurring	Main	Main	Main	Main			
Diane "Di" Barker	Tracey Wilkinson		Main	Main	Main	Main	Main	Main	
Karen Betts	Claire King		Main (Note: Claire King left in the thirteenth episode of series five.)	Main	Main	Main	Guest		
Barbara Hunt	Isabelle Amyes		Main (Note: Isabelle Amyes joined in the fifth episode of series two.)	Main	Main	Main			
Sharon "Shaz" Wiley	Lindsey Fawcett		Main (Note: Lindsey Fawcett joined in the ninth episode of series two.)	Main	Main	Main			
Josh Mitchell	Nathan Constance		Main	Main	Recurring				
Dr. Malcolm Nicholson	Philip McGough		Recurring	Recurring		Recurring	Main	Main	
Tina Purvis/ Julie O'Kane/ Tina O'Kane	Victoria Bush			Main (Note: Victoria Bush joined in the tenth episode of series three.)	Main	Main	Main	Main	Main
Alison "Al" McKenzie	Pauline Campbell			Main (Note: Pauline Campbell joined in the tenth episode of series three and left in the sixth episode of series six.)	Main	Main	Main		
Buki Lester	Kim Oliver			Main (Note: Kim Oliver joined in the fifth episode of series three.)	Main	Main			
Mark Waddle	Paul Opacic			Main (Note: Paul Opacic joined in the ninth episode of series three and left in the fourteenth episode of series four.)	Main				
Maxi Purvis	Kerry Norton			Main (Note: Kerry Norton joined in the tenth episode of series three and left in the twelfth episode of series four.)	Main				
Gina Rossi	Lisa Turner			Main (Note: Lisa Turner joined in the third episode of series three and left in the fourteenth episode.)					
Neil Grayling	James Gaddas				Main (Note: James Gaddas joined in the second episode of series four.)	Main	Main	Main	Guest
Snowball Merriman	Nicole Faraday				Main (Note: Nicole Faraday joined in the thirteenth episode of series four and left in the eleventh episode of series five.)	Main			
Cassie Tyler	Kellie Bright				Main (Note: Kellie Bright joined in the fourth episode of series four.)				
Roisin Connor	Siobhan McCarthy				Main (Note: Siobhan McCarthy joined in the fourth episode of series four.)				
Phyllida "Phyl" Oswyn	Stephanie Beacham					Main (Note: Stephanie Beacham joined in the third episode of series five.)	Main	Main	Main
Beverly "Bev" Tull	Amanda Barrie					Main (Note: Amanda Barrie joined in the third episode of series five.)	Main	Main	Main
Colin Hedges	Tristan Sturrock					Main (Note: Tristan Sturrock left in the sixth episode of series seven.)	Main	Main	
Selena Geeson	Charlotte Lucas					Main (Note: Charlotte Lucas joined in the thirteenth episode of series five.)	Main		
Kristen "Kris" Yates	Jennifer Ness					Main (Note: Jennifer Ness joined in the fourteenth episode of series five.)	Main		
Frances Myers	Eva Pope						Main		
Natalie Buxton	Dannielle Brent						Main (Note: Dannielle Brent only appeared in the first seven episodes of series 8 before returning for the final eleventh episode)	Main	Main
Darlene Cake	Antonia Okonma						Main	Main	Main
Janine Nebeski	Nicola Stapleton							Main	Main
Patricia "Pat" Kerrigan	Liz May Brice							Main (Note: Liz May Brice joined in the fifth episode of series seven.)	Main
Joy Masterton	Ellie Haddington							Main (Note: Ellie Haddington joined in the eleventh episode of series seven.)	Main
Arun Parmar	Rebecca Hazlewood							Main	
Sheena Williams	Laura Rogers							Main (Note: Ellie Haddington joined in the sixth episode of series seven.)	
Kevin Spiers	Andrew Scarborough							Main (Note: Andrew Scarborough joined in the seventh episode of series seven.)	
Louise "Lou" Stoke	Amanda Donohoe								Main
Donny Kimber	Sid Owen								Main
Rowan Dunlop	Colin Salmon								Main
Mandy Goodhue	Angela Bruce								Main

== Series 1 ==
=== Helen Stewart ===
- Portrayed by Simone Lahbib
- Appears in: Series 1–3

Helen Stewart is Wing Governor of G-Wing, whose authority is seldom respected by the prisoners. After a personal struggle with her sexuality, the battle to stand as an authority figure in Larkhall, and the breakup from her fiancé Sean, she goes on holiday to clear her head. After a delay in her flight, Helen is replaced by Jim Fenner. She returns shortly after but leaves. She returns to work with prisoners serving life sentences, is sexually assaulted by Jim, and struggles with coming to terms with her sexuality. She falls in love with prisoner Nikki Wade. When Simon is demoted after Shell Dockley, Denny Blood, and Shaz Wylie escape, Helen becomes the new acting governor of Larkhall. Her feud with Jim comes to a head and she resigns before she is sacked.

=== Nikki Wade ===
- Portrayed by Mandana Jones
- Appears in: Series 1–3

Nikki Wade is serving a life sentence for killing a policeman who tried to rape her then-girlfriend Trisha. An out and proud lesbian, Nikki is an outspoken strong-minded inmate who clashes with Helen at the start of the series. Hated by Jim, Nikki is respected by most of the other inmates apart from Shell. The pair frequently clash over Shell's relationship with Jim and the fact that Nikki is not impressed or intimidated by Shell. After being dumped by Trisha, Nikki falls for Helen and escapes from Larkhall in the series 2 finale before the two have sex. However, Helen refuses to run away with Nikki and returns her to prison and briefly ends their relationship. Nikki organises a peaceful protest when some of the officers brutally restrain Femi Bada, a non-English speaking inmate who is separated from her kids, which escalates into a riot and Helen ends their relationship again, though she continues to help her with her appeal. At the end of series 3, Dr Thomas Waugh breaks up with Helen after realising she is in love with Nikki, and Helen reunites with her after she wins her appeal.

=== Shell Dockley ===
- Portrayed by Debra Stephenson
- Appears in: Series 1–3, 5

Michelle "Shell" Dockley is serving life for the kidnap, torture, and murder of the woman who stole her boyfriend. Shell appeared from the first episode in series 1 until series 3 when Shell, Denny Blood and Shaz Wiley escape. During her reign as top dog she bullies inmate Rachel Hicks, which results in her suicide. She also has an affair with Jim, which ends violently when she calls his wife to have her hear them having sex in her cell. When Yvonne Atkins arrives, she takes over as top dog as the women respect her and she is not afraid of Shell. She suffers a breakdown in series two, which is brought on by the sexual abuse she suffered as a child from her parents. Shell takes revenge on Jim by luring him into her cell and stabbing him. Although she attempts to claim self-defence, she is charged with assault and attempted murder, but she escapes with Jim's help. Shell and Denny make recurring appearances throughout the remainder of series 3. Shell returns in series 5 when she is found by Jim, Collin Hedges, and Ken Pearce at an erotic dance club where she is performing before being arrested and sent back to Larkhall. She is pregnant and re-enters into a relationship with Jim, which ends when Shell is transferred to a psychiatric hospital shortly after giving birth.

Shell was voted #8 on Virgin Media's "Top 10 TV Criminals".

=== Jim Fenner ===
- Portrayed by Jack Ellis
- Appears in: Series 1–7

Jim Fenner is the principal officer of G-Wing, later wing governor, and then acting governor, and is one of the main antagonists of the series. He is a prison officer who bends and breaks rules. At the start of the programme he is portrayed as only slightly corrupt as he still cared for his family, but by series seven, he has killed a few people. He is killed in series 7 by Julie Johnston.

In 1999, Ellis accepted the role without looking at the scripts. He told Yvonne Swann of the Daily Mirror that he had been in debt, welcomed the role, and that "it certainly put [his] name on the map" as an actor.

=== Denny Blood ===
- Portrayed by Alicya Eyo
- Appears in: Series 1–5

Danielle "Denny" Blood is the enforcer and occasional lover of Shell. She is initially portrayed as thuggish and cruel but later develops to be somewhat caring and kind, especially to her girlfriend Shaz. When Shaz is accidentally killed in a fire, Denny seeks revenge on Snowball Merriman, an inmate who causes the fire during her escape. Denny later bonds with Yvonne Atkins.

=== Rachel Hicks ===
- Portrayed by Joanne Froggatt
- Appears in: Series 1

Rachel Hicks is a 19-year-old girl who is serving more than a year in prison for possession of drugs. She has a baby daughter named Maddie, who is taken in by her mother after her arrest. Rachel's mother puts Maddie into foster care as she is unable to look after her and wanted her life back. Rachel kills herself in the middle of series 1 after being bullied.

=== Lorna Rose ===
- Portrayed by Luisa Bradshaw-White
- Appears in: Series 1

Lorna Rose is a young prison officer who is blackmailed by Zandra Plackett and Shell to smuggle in drugs for them, which she is sacked for.

=== Dominic McAllister ===
- Portrayed by Joe Shaw
- Appears in: Series 1–2

Dominic McAllister is a young prison officer who is less corrupt than most of the officers. He leaves at the end of Series 2, when he met a girl whilst on holiday in Greece and fell in love with her.

=== Julie Saunders & Julie Johnston ===
- Portrayed by Victoria Alcock and Kika Mirylees
- Appears in: Series 1–8

The Two Julies appear in all eight series. They are ex-prostitutes who are often given jobs in the prison. They receive an additional 8-year sentence for scalding Johnson's teenage daughter's pimp. Despite often being involved in comic storylines, the pair had their share of drama, including Saunders surviving breast cancer and Julie J murdering Jim Fenner as revenge for his murder of their friend Yvonne Atkins. While Saunders uses her real name, Johnston's real name is Sonya Dawson.

=== Sylvia Hollamby ===
- Portrayed by Helen Fraser
- Appears in: Series 1–8

Sylvia "Body Bag" Hollamby is the longest serving prison officer on the show with Johnston and Saunders, being the only other characters to last all eight series. She is known to be cold and miserable, with her disdain for the prisoners evident in her actions.

=== Zandra Plackett ===
- Portrayed by Lara Cazalet
- Appears in: Series 1–2

Zandra Plackett is a drug addict serving ten months in prison for credit card fraud. She ends up in prison after taking the blame for something her lover, Robin Dunstan, did. Zandra dies from a malignant brain tumour.

=== Monica Lindsey ===
- Portrayed by Jane Lowe
- Appears in: Series 1, 3

Monica Lindsey is an elderly woman who is worried about her son Spencer, who has Down's Syndrome and dies while she is fighting for her appeal. She is released at the end of Series 1, but returns for one episode in Series 3 running a house for paroled prisoners.

=== Crystal Gordon ===
- Portrayed by Sharon Duncan Brewster
- Appears in: Series 1–4

Crystal Gordan is a religious prisoner whose morals are exploited by other prisoners to push their own agendas. While in G-Wing, she meets and falls in love with prison technician Josh Mitchell. Upon release, she moves in with Josh.

Crystal returns to prison after harbouring Shell and Denny when they escape from prison. While in prison the second time, she becomes pregnant but claims that she is still a virgin and that the pregnancy is the result of a miracle. When the child is born, she names it Zandra and moves into the Mother and Baby Unit. After another baby dies on the MBU, she loses her faith and starts running "anti-Bible classes". Owing to a sample mix-up by Di Barker, Crystal is accused of being on drugs until Charlotte Myddleton organises a second test – the mix-up was a plot by Di to break up Crystal and Josh's relationship.

=== Yvonne Atkins ===
- Portrayed by Linda Henry
- Appears in: 1–5

Yvonne Atkins is the top dog of G-Wing. She finds out that one of the prisoners, Snowball Merriman, is dating her son, Ritchie. Later in Series 5 she is murdered by Jim Fenner.

== Series 2 ==
=== Di Barker ===
- Portrayed by Tracey Wilkinson
- Appears in: Series 2–7

Diane "Di" Barker is a prison officer who lives at home with her elderly mother and is caring towards the prisoners, although has a strained relationship with her mother, which sometimes turns abusive. She tries to seduce various male officers without much success: Dominic, Josh Mitchell, Neil Grayling, Mark Waddle, Barry Pearce, and Jim. While Di is more sympathetic and moral than Fenner, she has a dark side to her personality, especially when it comes to the men she wants. When Fenner is murdered in Series 7, Di is the prime suspect after their divorce. She is later charged with Jim's murder and is, presumably, sent to prison.

=== Malcolm Nicholson ===
- Portrayed by Philip McGough
- Appears in: Series 2–3, 5–7

Malcolm Nicholson is Larkhall's senior medical officer in series two and three before being fired by Helen's serious concerns about his inability to diagnose the mental illness of "Podger" Pam Jolly. He is replaced by Thomas Waugh.

In series five, Nicholson returns. In series 6 he lazily assumes an outbreak of vomiting caused by hooch is just a viral infection. In series 7, he helps Jim get a vasectomy and when Sylvia comes into a large inheritance, Malcolm is conveniently there to help. The two marry and go off on their honeymoon. A provision in Sylvia's lesbian aunt's will dictates that the estate is not to be given to her but to several charities of choice if she remarries. When Sylvia explains this to Malcolm, he becomes enraged, ties Sylvia down to a chair, and attempts to kill her with an empty syringe. Just before Malcolm puts the needle in, Phyl Oswyn and Bev Tull appear on the balcony having discovered diamonds and a gun in their hotel suite and now escaping from their owner. Phyl shoots Nicholson and frees Sylvia before running away. Bev is captured by the Spanish police and is returned to Larkhall. Sylvia returns the favour to Bev and Phyl by providing them both with alcohol back in prison.

=== Babs Hunt ===
- Portrayed by Isabelle Amyes
- Appears in: Series 2–5

Barbara "Babs" Hunt is a middle-aged, middle-class woman, who is sent to prison for three years on a manslaughter charge for mercy-killing her terminally ill second husband. "Mad" Tessa Spall a mentally damaged prisoner takes advantage of this and pretends to be Babs. Babs is put into segregation while Tessa is inducted into the wing – she manages to then threaten Karen Betts with a syringe of HIV-positive blood. Hunt is devoutly religious, attends chapel frequently, and the prison officers give her significant responsibilities, which she sometimes abuses. Her fellow inmates often offend her traditional sensibilities: for example, she is uncomfortable with sharing a cell with Nikki, who is a lesbian. She stores all her thoughts in a diary, which is stolen by Shell. Babs confronts Shell, takes the diary back, and breaks her arm in the process.

She loathes her stepchildren from her second husband for testifying against her in court, revealing that she did not get properly divorced from her first husband, and contesting her inheritance. Some of the inmates in G-Wing start a campaign of bullying her stepchildren over the phone until the prison officers find out.

At the end of season five, she marries Henry Mills, the prison chaplain, before being released.

=== Karen Betts ===
- Portrayed by Claire King
- Appears in: Series 2–6

Karen Betts became the new governor of G-Wing after Helen resigns. She is tough but fair with the prisoners and is in an on-off relationship with Jim. Jim frames her for a hit and run, which causes her to lose her job. She returns briefly in series 6 when she discovers CCTV footage of him the night he frames her.

=== Shaz Wiley ===
- Portrayed by Lindsey Fawcett
- Appears in: Series 2–4

Sharon "Shaz" Wiley is Denny's girlfriend. They both escape with Shell in series 3, but Shaz has an accident and is brought back to prison, where she is bullied by Al McKenzie and Maxi Purvis. With Yvonne's help, she beats Maxi up. She is transferred to another prison as Sylvia disapproves of her same-sex relationship with Denny, and forces them to separate so that they cannot contact each other. Her letters to Denny are intercepted by Sylvia in an attempt to prevent their communication. She returns at the end of series 4 with magic mushrooms for her and Denny. She dies in a fire when Snowball sets off a bomb as part of her escape plan.

== Series 3 ==
=== Tina O'Kane ===
- Portrayed by Victoria Bush
- Appears in: Series 3–8

Tina O'Kane (originally known as Tina Purvis, and also known as Julie O'Kane) is a girl who enters prison along with her sister Maxi Purvis and Al McKenzie as part of the Peckham Boot Gang. She becomes the understudy of the glamorous brothel-keeper Virginia O'Kane. Maxi and Al bully and physically assault Tina for her friendship with Virginia, and kill Virginia when that fails to deter them. After Maxi dies, Tina dyes her hair blonde and becomes the third of the Julies naming herself Julie O'Kane; she drops this after feeling excluded by the closeness of the other 2 Julies, and renames herself Tina O'Kane. Tina becomes institutionalized during her stay at Larkhall and every time she is released, she commits a crime to be arrested again. She later refers to the prison as "home" and her cell as her "room".

=== Maxi Purvis ===
- Portrayed by Kerry Norton
- Appears in: Series 3–4

Maxine "Maxi" Purvis is the head of the Peckham Boot Gang and tries to become Top Dog of G-Wing but fails miserably when she gets beaten up by Shaz. She has her subordinate kill Virginia and attempts to kill Yvonne. Maxi commits suicide after losing a fight against Shaz.

=== Al McKenzie ===
- Portrayed by Pauline Campbell
- Appears in: Series 3–6

Alison "Al" McKenzie is a member of the Peckham Boot Gang. Her and Maxi try to become the Top Dog of G-Wing. She initially bullies Shaz, gets beaten up by Yvonne, kills Virginia, and helps her sister Maxi commit suicide. Al is poisoned and dies in series 6.

=== Buki Lester ===
- Portrayed by Kim Oliver
- Appears in: Series 3–5

Buki Lester is a drug addict who seeks her child whom she abandoned, and develops a bond with Baxter, who dies. She is eventually reunited with her son Lennox, and they go to live with actor Christopher Biggins who offers to take them in.

=== Virginia O'Kane ===
- Portrayed by Kate O'Mara
- Appears in: Series 3

Virginia O'Kane is an elderly brothel owner who is murdered by Al.

== Series 4 ==
=== Neil Grayling ===
- Portrayed by James Gaddas
- Appears in: Series 4–8

Neil Grayling is the governor of Larkhall prison. He is a closeted homosexual for most of the show. He has an open feud with Jim, marries Di, and has a sexual relationship with Sylvia's son, Bobby Darren. He is idealistic and keen on prison reform, which does not sit well with the more conservative prison officers. He dies from the outbreak of Legionnaire's disease in series 8.

=== Cassie Tyler ===
- Portrayed by Kellie Bright
- Appears in: Series 4

Cassie Tyler arrives at Larkhall with her girlfriend Roisin. Cassie easily adapts to prison life and is comfortable with her sexuality unlike Roisin. They are both pardoned after saving Neil from the fire started by Snowball Merriman.

=== Roisin Connor ===
- Portrayed by Siobhan McCarthy
- Appears in: Series 4

Roisin Connor is an Irish woman who is married with two children and also in a relationship with Cassie Tyler, which her husband, who refuses to allow their children to see her in prison, disapproves of. Roisin complains regularly in prison, appears to be losing her mind, and takes drugs as a coping mechanism. They are both pardoned after saving Neil from the fire started by Snowball.

=== Snowball Merriman ===
- Portrayed by Nicole Faraday
- Appears in: Series 4–5

"Snowball" Merriman is a woman who enters the prison with an American accent who convinces the prisoners that she is a Hollywood actress. Yvonne discovers that she is a pornstar, and Snowball dates Yvonne's son Ritchie. She plants a bomb in the prison in order to escape, but is caught at the gate by Karen. The bomb has devastating effects: Barbara goes deaf and Shaz dies. As a result of the bomb, Snowball becomes the most hated prisoner ever, with Saunders, Johnston, and Tina giving her a raw chicken for dinner. Snowball has her hair set on fire by Denny and Top Dog Shell Dockley. She holds Karen at gunpoint in an attempt to escape. She attempts to shoot Karen outside, but accidentally shoots and paralyses Ritchie She is sent back to prison and eats her raw food to be sent to a hospital. She is caught after trying to escape again. Ritchie visits her, and they agree on a suicide pact to overdose on pills, Ritchie dies, but Snowball does not. She hangs herself in front of G Wing.

== Series 5 ==
=== Kris Yates ===
- Portrayed by Jennifer Ness
- Appears in: Series 5–6

Kristen "Kris" Yates is sent to prison for murdering her father. It is later revealed that her younger sister, Milly, killed their father but Kris protected her. She is last seen on top of Wellington Arch protesting her innocence with her girlfriend Selena Geeson.

=== Selena Geeson ===
- Portrayed by Charlotte Lucas
- Appears in: Series 5–6

Selena Geeson becomes a guard to be close to her lover, Kris. Despite being there just for Kris, she is noted by others to be a competent prison officer. She is last seen on top of Wellington Arch with Kris.

=== Colin Hedges ===
- Portrayed by Tristan Sturrock
- Appears in: Series 5–7

Colin Hedges is a prison officer who has a relationship with Yvonne. He was last seen attacking Father Kelly after he was exposed as a rapist and child abuser. He has a sexual relationship with Frances, which lasts throughout series 6. He also becomes close to inmate Laura Canning, who commits suicide. Johnston has a soft spot for Colin, but is crushed when Saunders catches him and Frances sharing an intimate kiss. In series 5, he tries to force Shell to have sex with him, but she refuses.

=== Bev Tull ===
- Portrayed by Amanda Barrie
- Appears in: Series 5–8

Beverly "Bev" Tull first appears in series 5. She and Phyl Oswyn are known as the Costa Cons, who are successful con artists and managed to con many inmates: for example, Bev and Phyl make Denny believe that Bev is a medium. After conning Sylvia, they are transferred to an open prison but return shortly after. When Phyl becomes top dog, Bev winds up with a heroin addiction, which almost kills her. They continue to trick most inmates and officers in G-Wing. She and Phyl later escape to Marbella but Bev is caught and sent back to Larkhall; following an incident with a suspicious bureau de change clerk, eventually so is Phyl. The two remain until the final episode of the series in which they help Janine Nebeski give birth.

=== Phyl Oswyn ===
- Portrayed by Stephanie Beacham
- Appears in: Series 5–8

Phyllida "Phyl" Oswyn first appears in series 5 mainly for the role of comic relief in the usually dark storylines. She and Bev are known as the Costa Cons. After conning Sylvia they are transferred to an open prison, but abuse their privileges and are returned to Larkhall. Phyl becomes top dog after Yvonne's escape, but loses the position in a power struggle with Frances. Phyl and Bev succeed in conning many inmates, but after a deal goes horribly wrong, they escape from Larkhall to Marbella after committing murder and theft, Bev is sent back to Larkhall while Phyl remains in Spain for a few more days. She is later returned, and the two remain until the final episode in 2006, in which they help Janine give birth.

== Series 6 ==
=== Natalie Buxton ===
- Portrayed by Dannielle Brent
- Appears in: Series 6–8

Natalie Buxton was sent to Larkhall for income tax fraud in the first episode of series six but was transferred when her real crime was exposed by Frances Myers (Eva Pope). She returned four episodes later and she mainly featured in an antagonistic role while in a power struggle with Wing Governor Frances and manipulating and being violent towards inmates. Natalie later became Top Dog of G-Wing but her reign was cut short when Pat Kerrigan (Liz May Brice) took over. Natalie continued to bully and harm others until she was killed off in the eighth and final series after a fight with Pat. After a few days of hoarding her body, Pat, Johnston, and Saunders disposed of her corpse by putting it in the sewers. She returns as a ghost in the 2006 Christmas Special.

The role was originally offered to Danniella Westbrook.

=== Darlene Cake ===
- Portrayed by Antonia Okonma
- Appears in: Series 6–8

Darlene Cake is a bad-tempered Yardie gang member sent to Larkhall after being convicted of grievous bodily harm. If anyone disses her, she immediately accuses them of racism, even though Sylvia is the only person who makes racist remarks towards her. Darlene is feeling ill when her cellmate, Al is murdered after being poisoned. Tanya Turner arrives at Larkhall and reveals that she has relations with a man named Rick Revoir; Darlene steals from Rick and discovers that he has her younger brother, Terence, held hostage. With Tanya and Frances' help, she manages to get Rick arrested and Terence freed. Bev and Phyl manipulate Darlene into thinking that it is Natalie who poisoned Al, when it was them who poisoned her accidentally with rhubarb leaves. Natalie and Darlene fight in the middle of G-Wing over Al's death, and Natalie wins. She later becomes Natalie's lackey with Janine. When Natalie has her hair cut with the Saunders and Johnston, Darlene makes a horrible comment about Saunders' breast cancer, which leads to the two taking revenge by bleaching Darlene's hair, leading it to fall out. Darlene and Janine later turn against Natalie after discovering that she is a child molester. Darlene and Janine remain good friends and write a novel together. They plot to murder Jim and write their plans down in their novel. Darlene shoots Jim with a poison thorne while he is sleeping, and when he is murdered, Janine believes that it was she and Darlene who killed him. The police acquire the novel after Sheena Williams hands it in. They are both questioned, but Di is charged with Fenner's murder. In series 8, Darlene notices chemistry between Janine and new prison officer Donny Kimber. When she discovers that Janine is writing love letters to Donny, she hides them so that Janine cannot find them. When this is uncovered, Janine slaps and gets into a small fight with Darlene in the middle of G-Wing. They are both subsequently taken down the block. After murdering Catherine Earlham's husband, she later attempts suicide by setting fire to herself after taking Janine hostage.

=== Frances Myers ===
- Portrayed by Eva Pope
- Appears in: Series 6

Frances Myers arrives as a prisoner with Natalie, and protects her when the prisoners discover she is a child molester. She is an undercover detective, set out to catch Natalie, and she later becomes the governor of G-Wing. Outside of her work life, she is shown to be promiscuous and has a sexual relationship with Colin. She does not appear in series 7, but is mentioned in a magazine article as becoming number 1 at HMP Whitehouse.

== Series 7 ==
=== Pat Kerrigan ===
- Portrayed by Liz May Brice
- Appears in: Series 7–8

Patricia "Pat" Kerrigan is an inmate who is imprisoned for stabbing her ex-boyfriend. She comes to Larkhall on her own request, and her motives are revealed when she takes a nun (Sister Thomas Moore) hostage and reveals the abuse she suffered by the nun and another priest (Father Kelly). Pat becomes enemies with Natalie and later wins against her in a fight. Pat becomes the new top dog and becomes infatuated with another inmate, Sheena Williams.

=== Janine Nebeski ===
- Portrayed by Nicola Stapleton
- Appears in: Series 7–8

Janine Nebeski receives five years for credit card fraud. She arrives at Larkhall with her friend Arun Parmar, and blames her for them being in prison. She immediately gets on the wrong side of Natalie who stabs her in the eye with a pin, and she tries to win over Natalie by snitching on Arun, who tells her to report Natalie, Janine brings Arun to the prison library only for Natalie to grab her and tell Janine to hit her in the ribs with an improvised weapon. Janine and Darlene become Natalie's cronies, and after they discover Arun is a trans woman, they begin bullying her worse and demand that she be sent to a men's prison. Pat sticks up for Arun and outs Natalie as a child molester, which cause Janine and Darlene to turn against her. When Janine's father visits her in prison, he tells her that her mother died, and that she had broken her mother's heart by being in prison, as she was given release from prison to attend her mother's funeral, Natalie forces her to bring drugs back to the prison, but Janine is caught. She begins a relationship with Donny, and when she receives day release from the prison, she tells Donny she cannot go back and runs away, but he chases after her and handcuffs her. She becomes pregnant by Donny, who worries about his career. When Darlene threatens to set herself on fire after she had been wrongfully accused of murder, she takes Janine hostage, After the hostage situation, Janine gives birth to her and Donny's daughter, Beverly-Janine.

=== Arun Parmar ===
- Portrayed by Rebecca Hazlewood
- Appears in: Series 7

Arun Parmar receives three years for credit card fraud, and arrives at Larkhall with Janine, who blames Arun for them being in prison. Arun does not like Natalie, who orders Janine to lure her into the library, where Natalie holds Arun and gets Janine to hit her in the ribs with an improvised weapon. Arun confides in Di, who speaks to Jim about giving Arun an induction. Arun is later delighted when Sister Thomas Moore arrives at Larkhall after being arrested for stealing from a child's orphanage. Arun later becomes desperate for some medication, and refuses to tell the prison officers about it. The truth is later discovered when Arun reveals to Sister Thomas that she is a trans woman who needs hormone pills. After discovering that Sister Thomas is a child abuser, she reverts to being a Muslim and covers her face. Natalie does not take kindly to this and reveals her face to the entire prison, revealing a beard. The girls demand that Arun is taken to a men's prison, which is later decided by Neil. Arun is later touched when Pat fights Natalie for the right for her to stay at Larkhall, and wins. Arun later finds herself falling in love with Pat, but is not happy when Sheena becomes good friends with Pat and later begins a relationship with her. Arun is last seen playing Prince Charming in Larkhall's pantomime.

=== Sheena Williams ===
- Portrayed by Laura Rogers
- Appears in: Series 7

Sheena Williams is serving time in Larkhall for drug-related crimes. She is first seen on the mother/baby unit with her young son, Dylan. She talks to Di about her looking after Dylan when she has to go back to G-Wing. She later agrees to let Di take care of Dylan, but Jim does not take kindly to the idea of there being a baby in the house. Di later tells Sheena that she cannot take care of Dylan, so Pat tells Sheena that she knows a friend who could look after Dylan while she serves time. Despite Di's scheming to try to have Dylan in her life, Pat's friend friend gets custody of Dylan. Sheena falls in love with Pat, and they start a sexual relationship. However, Arun also has feelings for Pat and does not leave the pair alone. Eventually, Arun becomes good friends with Darlene, Janine, and Tina, so Sheena and Pat get some alone time. When Jim is murdered, Pat becomes a suspect after the police find a sharpened piece of wood in her sleeve. Sheena finds Darlene and Janine's novel holding their plans to kill Jim and she hands it in to the police. Janine and Darlene are questioned but not charged. When Janine and Darlene find out that it was Sheena who snitched on them, they go to attack her, but Sheena threatens to tell Pat about it, and they leave her alone. Arun later moves back to the Four Bed Dorm with Tina, Darlene, and Janine, and Sheena moves into Pat's cell. On her final night in Larkhall, Pat and Sheena have sex to show their love for one another. When Sheena is released, she moves in with Pat's friend and is delighted to see Dylan. She contacts Dylan's father, Brendan, who is a drug dealer. He begs Sheena to look after drugs for him, and when she says no, he hides them in the cupboard. Pat's friend sees this and calls the police, and Sheena is arrested and sent back to Larkhall again. She is back in a cell with Pat before being released from Larkhall a second time off-screen. In series 8 Sheena breaks up with Pat via a letter, revealing she'd fallen in love with a man.

=== Joy Masterton ===
- Portrayed by Ellie Haddington
- Appears in: Series 7–8

Joy Masterton becomes the new governor of Larkhall after Phyl and Bev escape. She scolds Neil about the state of Larkhall, and she becomes unpopular with the inmates. She immediately clashes with Pat, but gets along with Natalie, as she is trying to impress Joy so she can have a weekend out. Joy allows Natalie to leave for the weekend with prison officer Kevin Spiers. Joy changes all the cells and cellmates, angering the inmates. When Phyl is returned to Larkhall, Joy who orders her to run around the prison a number of times. Joy gets along well with Chaplain Christy Mackay, and it soon becomes apparent that she adores Christmas. Her love of Christmas is short-lived when mental new inmate Miranda Miles murders Christy, and Johnston suffers a mental breakdown. After witnessing Christy's body, Joy and Kevin send Miranda to a psychiatric hospital. In the next series, Joy is assisted by new Deputy Governor Lou Stoke. She bad-mouths Neil to Lou, unaware that the two already know each other. When Neil has enough of Joy's orders, he threatens to walk out of his job and, when nobody can find him, believe he resigned, only for Lou to find him dead after catching Legionnaires' disease. When the other prison officers learn of the disease in Larkhall, they race out of the building, trample on her, knocking her out. Joy later regains consciousness, and is stunned when she witnesses all of G-Wing's prisoners escaping. They are all ordered back inside the prison, but Phyl is shot when she attempts to run away.

Later on in the series, new inmate Stella Gough pleases Joy when she tells her she wants to join the army, and she sustains a nasty fall when she tries to show off to Joy. While she is in the hospital, Stella reveals that she knows Joy is her mother, and Joy is stunned to know that she has been reunited with her daughter. Stella reveals that she knows why Joy gave her up for adoption: she had told Social Services that she was raped. Stella confides in Joy saying that she was raped. When Joy sees Stella being attacked by Darlene and Tina, she steps in and is punched in the stomach by Darlene. Joy then reveals the truth to Stella that she was not raped, but that she just drunkenly had sex while she was in the army. Stella attacks Joy with a smashed glasses lens attached to a toothbrush, and new prison officer Mandy Goodhue saves her. Joy then takes a leave of absence when she turns to alcohol for comfort. When she returns, she has to deal with Janine's pregnancy. Janine tells Joy that her boyfriend, "Michael", is responsible, but the biological father is Donny. Joy discovers this and threatens to fire him. When Darlene sets fire to herself on the landing of G-Wing, Donny saves her and Joy commends him for his quick thinking, saying that he is allowed to keep his job. Joy is not seen after this.

=== Kevin Spiers ===
- Portrayed by Andrew Scarborough
- Appears in: Series 7

Kevin Spiers is introduced as a replacement for Colin. When Jim is murdered, Kevin becomes a suspect after their friendship becomes sour. Kevin begins having sex with Natalie, but she is only using him for her "weekend out". Kevin is about to escort Natalie, when the alarms go off after Bev and Phyl's escape. When the weekend out arrives, Natalie and Kevin have sex yet again, but things turn sour when she sprays Kevin in the eyes with a can of mace, and she attempts to make her great escape, but she is stopped by a mob organised by Pat. They wait outside her hotel and attack her. Kevin saves Natalie and their relationship begins yet again. When in the chapel, Kevin and Natalie are caught having anal sex by Christy. Kevin orders Natalie to stop Christy from telling Joy, so she manipulates Miranda into murdering Christy with a sharpened cross. When Kevin and Joy find Christy's corpse in the shower, they immediately send Miranda to a psychiatric hospital. Kevin is last seen looking worried after Natalie tells him that she manipulated Miranda into killing Christy.

== Series 8 ==
=== Lou Stoke ===
- Portrayed by Amanda Donohoe
- Appears in: Series 8

Louise "Lou" Stoke is hired as a governor of G-Wing to help out Joy. She instantly makes herself noticed by the inmates, and has a kind and sensitive side to her. Joy bad-mouths Neil to Lou, unaware that Neil and Lou already know each other. Lou discovers Neil dead on the floor of his office following the sudden outbreak of Legionnaires' disease. Following the prisoners' escape after the disease, Lou and Rowan Dunlop help Tina as she is seriously ill after catching the disease. Lou and Rowan become closer and have sex in the bathroom. Lou escorts a new inmate, Angela Robbins, to Rowan's office for a health check-up when Angela attacks Lou violently. Rowan diagnoses Angela with dissociative identity disorder and the pair have her shipped out of Larkhall. Later, Lou finds Vicky, her sister, at a strip club, where they exchange insults and fight each other. Lou feels embarrassed when she realises that Rowan has witnessed the fight. Later on, Lou invites Rowan to her flat for dinner, which he accepts. During their meal, Vicky turns up and collapses after a suicide attempt. When Vicky regains consciousness, she warns her about Rowan. When Lou discovers that a young girl, Vanessa Andrews, is being used to smuggle drugs into prisons using her vagina, she confronts Natalie after Pat snitches on her. Natalie acts as if she knows nothing about Vanessa, so Lou cannot charge her.

=== Rowan Dunlop ===
- Portrayed by Colin Salmon
- Appears in: Series 8

Rowan Dunlop is a replacement doctor to Malcolm. He diagnoses the outbreak of Legionnaires' disease. All of the prison officers escape, along with some of the prisoners, and only Rowan, Tina, Lou, and Pat are left in the building. Outside, Phyl is shot when she attempts to run away, and Rowan informs her that she would have died if the bullet had gone any deeper into her stomach. Phyl pretends to show signs of paranoia, and tells Bev that she is faking her symptoms. They later discover that Rowan is secretly working for a television series called Women Inside, so Phyl and Bev blackmail Rowan into allowing Phyl to go to a professional hospital, or they would tell Joy about his secret; Rowan gives in. Rowan and Lou become intimate and have sex in the bathroom. Shortly after, Rowan witnesses Lou's catfight with her younger sister, Vicky in a strip club, leaving Lou embarrassed. When Lou invites Rowan to her flat for dinner, he accepts and reveals that he is married. During their meal, Vicky arrives and collapses after a suicide attempt. Lou discovers that Rowan has been feeding her sister Vicky drugs, and lures her into taking another overdose; he was planning on letting her die, but is forced to act when discovered at the last minute. Vicky confesses all to Lou on the way to hospital, and she returns to Larkhall long enough to strike him in the head with a paperweight. He is forced to leave Larkhall by Joy.

=== Mandy Goodhue ===
- Portrayed by Angela Bruce
- Appears in: Series 8

Mandy Goodhue is first seen patrolling around G-Wing as a new prison officer. When the sudden outbreak of Legionnaires' disease infects Larkhall, Mandy unlocks the doors for the prison officers to escape, which the prisoners take advantage of. While fleeing from the building, the prison officers knock out Joy and trample on her. Mandy is next seen saving Joy from being attacked by Stella. Soon after, Mandy is searching all of the visitors so that they can visit their prisoners. When Mandy searches young girl Vanessa Andrews, she cannot find anything abnormal on her, but it is later revealed that she was hiding drugs in her vagina to give to Natalie. She supervises David (Saunders' son) and his fiancée's wedding in G-Wing. Mandy allows Natalie to take out the rubbish bags, unaware that she is actually planning on escaping.

=== Donny Kimber ===
- Portrayed by Sid Owen
- Appears in: Series 8

Donny Kimber is transferred from D-Wing to help out at G-Wing after Kevin's departure. He and Lou escort Janine to her mother's funeral, where it is revealed that she hid drugs in her shoes, organised by Natalie. The entire prison believe that Janine is addicted to drugs, and Donny tells Janine that he is pleased with her for taking up rehab. Soon after, Donny kisses Janine. He tells Janine that he loves her and they have sex numerous times, although Darlene senses that something is going on. When Janine begins writing love letters to Donny, they go missing, and Darlene is revealed to be the culprit. Janine slaps Darlene in the middle of G-Wing and a minor fight erupts. Donny witnesses the assault and sends both Janine and Darlene down the block. Janine eventually becomes pregnant with Donny's baby, so she convinces Joy that her boyfriend, "Michael", is responsible. Joy realises that it is Donny's child and threatens to have him fired. After Darlene sets herself on fire, Donny puts her out, and Joy lets him keep his job. A while later, Phyl and Bev help deliver Janine's baby, whom she names Beverly Janine. Donny is last seen celebrating the birth of Beverly with Janine.

=== Stella Gough ===
- Portrayed by Helen Modern
- Appears in: Series 8

Stella enters Larkhall to meet her birth mother, Joy. Stella ends up in the hospital after suffering a concussion, and tells Joy she is her daughter when the latter visits her. Joy does not take it well and denies it. After talking with Joy again, Stella learns that she had lied about being becoming pregnant through rape and becomes furious. She makes a weapon out of a toothbrush and a piece of glass, and takes Joy hostage. Joy is saved by Mandy after the staff became aware of her absence. She is sent back to her previous prison.
