= Mandana Jones =

British actress (born 1967)

- Born: Jane Mandana Jones; 26 February 1967 (age 59)
- Education: Drama Centre London
- Occupation: Actress

Jane Mandana Jones (born 26 February 1967) is a British-Iranian actress. She is known for her role as prisoner Nikki Wade in the series Bad Girls.

== Early life ==
From West London, Jones was born on 26 February 1967 to a Welsh father and an Iranian mother. She is the youngest of three, having two older brothers. She graduated from the Drama Centre London.

== Career ==
Jones's TV work includes the regional soap London Bridge (shown in certain ITV regions in the UK in the mid-1990s) and the BBC daytime soap Doctors as Ria Ford. For her role as Ria, she received a nomination for Villain of the Year at the 2005 British Soap Awards. Probably her most high-profile role is as lesbian lifer Nikki Wade on Bad Girls, in which her on-screen love interest, Helen Stewart, was played by another former cast member of London Bridge, Simone Lahbib.

Her second largest role was in the 2004 BBC TV children's show Powers, where she played Dr. Mary Holland for the duration of the 13-episode series.

Between Bad Girls and Powers, she had a small role in the short, Occasional, Strong (2002). Other work during this time includes the aforementioned Doctors, where she played Sandra Underwood (2003), BBC's Afternoon Play, Coming Up For Air (2003), Holby City (1 episode, 2003), Born and Bred (1 episode, 2004). She returned to Doctors in 2005, playing a different character (Ria Ford, 6 episodes), for which she was nominated for Villain of the Year at the British Soap Awards. She then had a small stint as a marriage counsellor Anna Price in EastEnders.

Jones also played a character named Nancy Randall in The Bill during December 2008.

She played a character named Charlotte Thornhill in Casualty on 7 November 2010.

In 2012, she played Dr Broadwood in an episode of Silent Witness.

In April 2016, Jones worked on Emmerdale as Aaron's solicitor in a case against Aaron's father.

== Personal life ==
Jones has a son, Enzo (born 27 October 2005).

== Filmography ==
Year	Title	Role	Notes
1996	London Bridge	Sam Haynes	(13 episodes)
1997	The New Adventures of Robin Hood	Woman Henchbeast	Season 1 (guest, “A Price on His Soul”)
1999–2001	Bad Girls	Nikki Wade	Season 1–3 (main, 33 episodes)
2002	Occasional, Strong	Cathy	Short film
2003	The Afternoon Play	Sarah	Season 1 (guest, “Coming Up for Air”)
2003	Doctors	Sandra Underwood	Season 5 (guest, “Loose Ends”)
2003	Holby City	Geri Sanders	Season 5 (guest, “House of Cards”)
2004	Born and Bred	Janet Gough	Season 3 (guest, “A Small Flourish”)
2004	Powers	Dr Mary Holland	Season 1 (main, all 13 episodes)
2005	Doctors	Ria Ford	Season 6–7 (recurring, 6 episodes)
2006	Random Quest	BBC Newsreader	TV movie
2007	EastEnders	Anna Price	(Guest, 2 episodes)
2008	The Bill	Nancy Randall	Season 24 (guest, “Too Hot to Handle” Parts 1–3)
2010	Casualty	Charlotte Thornhill	Season 25 (guest, “Hands On”)
2012	Silent Witness	Dr. Broadwood	Season 15 (guest, “Fear” Parts 1 & 2)
2014	Law & Order: UK	Dr. Antonia Carey	Season 8 (guest, “Safe from Harm”)
2016	Emmerdale	Prosecution Barrister	(Guest, 2 episodes)
2016	Line of Duty	Summers	Season 3 (guest, “The List”)
2016	New Blood	Nasreen Sayyad	Season 1 (recurring, 4 episodes)
2017	Liar	Dr. Rachael Kyle	Season 1 (guest, “Check Mate”)
2018	Doctors	Linda Klute	Season 19 (guest, “A Happy Medium”)
2020	Strike	Dr. Kamila Muhammad	Season 4 (guest, “Lethal White” Parts 3 & 4)
