= Victoria Bush =

British actress and comedian

- Occupations: Actress; Comedian
- Years active: 2000–present

Victoria Bush is a British actress and comedian. She is best known for portraying the roles of Tina O'Kane in the ITV prison drama series Bad Girls (2001–2006), and Sonya Donnegan in the BBC One school-based drama series Waterloo Road (2012–2015). In 2024 she starred in the UK tour as Ann Frank with Su Pollard playing her mother.

== Career ==
Bush trained at the Mountview Academy of Theatre Arts.

On leaving drama school, she secured her first major television role in the ITV prison drama Bad Girls in 2001 as Tina Purvis (later Julie O'Kane, then Tina O'Kane) during the shows' third series. Bush continued in the role for a further five series until the shows axe in 2006.

Bush is one half of female comedy duo of Checkley & Bush with Laura Checkley. Tours include "Keep Calm and Carry On", which featured at the Edinburgh Fringe Festival in 2011, which included cameos from Abbey Merritt and Vev Gaunt.

In 2012, Bush joined the cast of the BBC school drama Waterloo Road as new school secretary Sonya Donnegan. She continued in the role for a further three series until the show's cancellation in 2015.

In 2015, she guest-starred in the BBC hospital drama Casualty as Florence Lale, and in 2016 the ITV soap opera Coronation Street as Vanessa. The following year, she played the part of Kitty Birch in BBC's Doctors.

== Filmography ==
=== Film ===
Year	Title	Role	Notes
2012	Undead Apocalypse	Zombie 2	

=== Television ===
Year	Title	Role	Notes
2001–2006	Bad Girls	Tina O'Kane	Regular role; 73 episodes
2012–2015	Waterloo Road	Sonya Donnegan	Regular role; 62 episodes
2015	Casualty	Florence Lale	Episode: "All the Single Ladies"
2016	Coronation Street	Vanessa	1 episode
2017	Doctors	Kate 'Kitty' Birch	Episode: "A Tale of Two Kittys"
2018–2019	Lee and Dean	Maz Dolan	2 episodes
