= Alicya Eyo =

English actress

- Born: 16 December 1975 (age 49); Huyton, Merseyside, England
- Occupation: Actress
- Years active: 1997–present
- Notable work: Bad Girls (1999–2003); Emmerdale (2011–2015)
- Website: alicyaeyo.net

Alicya Eyo (born 16 December 1975) is an English actress, best known for her roles as Denny Blood in the ITV prison drama series Bad Girls and Ruby Haswell in the ITV soap opera Emmerdale.

== Early life ==
Eyo was born on 16 December 1975 in Huyton, Merseyside. Her mother, Sue, is a jazz singer. She grew up in the Toxteth area of Liverpool. Her love of drama started when she was nine, and she attended drama and dance classes every Saturday. When she was 14, she moved to London with her family. She trained at the Courtyard Theatre School.

== Career ==
=== Early career ===
Eyo's first television appearance was in 1997, in Casualty, which was filmed earlier. She also made an appearance on Hetty Wainthropp Investigates and appeared in Gold the follow-up drama series to Band of Gold as a young prostitute involved with Yardie gangsters who come over to Bradfords red light district from Leeds to clear up the Lane. In 1999, Eyo appeared with Goldie in the David Bowie film Everybody Loves Sunshine known as B.U.S.T.E.D., internationally. She also starred in the movie G:MT – Greenwich Mean Time. However, Eyo's big break came in 1998 when she was offered the part of Denny Blood, in Bad Girls. The series was broadcast in June the following year when the UK viewing public first saw Eyo as Denny Blood in a pink PVC suit dancing to the N-Trance remix of Stayin' Alive by the Bee Gees.

=== Bad Girls ===
At the end of the sixth series (in which Eyo did not appear), the character of Denny Blood was voted the sixth favourite inmate on Bad Girls: Most Wanted. Denny's tragic upbringing, lead to the touching and tragic storylines with her mother, Jessie Devlin (played by Denise Black), and the relationship with stand-in mother Yvonne Atkins (Linda Henry). Blood also met the love of her life Shaz Wiley (Lindsey Fawcett), who died at the end of Series 4. Denny was devastated but found comfort in painting and was last seen being transferred to an open prison to serve the rest of her sentence. Just before Bad Girls was axed, the Bad Girls' creators were going to ask Eyo to reprise her role as Denny.

During this time, Eyo also appeared in the film The Low Down, in an episode of Urban Gothic and in Tube Tales. Since leaving Bad Girls, Eyo appeared in Holby City twice, as two separate characters, and the BBC daytime drama Doctors. Eyo plays Gaynor Harvey in Shed Productions drama Bombshell. However, Bombshell still has not been shown in the UK, but has aired in New Zealand.

=== Theatre ===
Eyo studied at the Court Theatre Training Company in London, graduating in 1996. Since her graduation Eyo has also performed at various theatres including the Royal Court Theatre, Theatre Royal (Nottingham), Theatre 503 and the Everyman (Liverpool). She also performed in the critically acclaimed play Any Which Way.

=== Emmerdale ===
In October 2011, Eyo began appearing in Emmerdale as Ruby Haswell, the lesbian partner of Ali Spencer (Kelli Hollis). Eyo's role ended on 6 August 2015 when her character died in a helicopter crash.

== Personal life ==
Eyo is a pescatarian. She is a supporter and patron of The Proud Trust, an LGBT charity that provides services and support for young people.

== Filmography ==
Television
Year	Title	Role	Notes
1996	Theatreland	Herself	Talk show
1997	Casualty	Julie	Series 12, episode 2
1997	Hetty Wainthropp Investigates	Tricia Grice	Series 3, episode 1
1998	Dear Nobody	Ruthlyn	TV movie
1999	Wing and a Prayer	Roz Cairnforth	Series 2, episode 1
1999–2003	Bad Girls	Daniella 'Denny' Blood	Series 1–5 (main role, 59 episodes)
2001	Urban Gothic	Amber	Series 2, episode 1
2003	Merseybeat	Kim Vale	Series 4, episode 1
2004	Holby City	Emma Bennet	Series 6, episode 15
2004	Doctors	Dawn Fuller	Series 6, episode 59
2006	Holby City	Rae Hollins	Series 8, episode 17
2006	Bombshell	Gunner Gaynor Harvey	Series 1 (main role, 7 episodes)
2006	Spooks	Raoula	Series 5, episode 2
2007	The Bill	Daisy Driscoll	Series 23, episode 9
2008	Casualty	Lissa Burrows	Series 22, episode 41
2009	Paradox	Jean Fellowes	Series 1, episode 3
2010	Casualty	Claire Lomas	Series 24, episode 27
2011	Silent Witness	Joanne McDermott	Series 14, episodes 5 & 6
2011	Justice	Angie	Series 1, episodes 3 & 5
2011	Waterloo Road	Sandi Mansfield	Series 7, episode 5
2011–2015	Emmerdale	Ruby Haswell	(main role, 410 episodes)
2011	Moving On	Ally	Series 3, episode 1
2014	Text Santa	Herself	Aired on 19 December 2014
2016	Silent Witness	Jo Keating	Series 19, episodes 7 & 8
2017	Little Boy Blue	Morgue Nurse	Miniseries (episode 1)
2017	In the Dark	Davina	Miniseries (episode 1)
2018	Doctors	Celia Skilton	Series 19, episode 212
2018	Different for Girls	Jo	Series 2, episode 1
2019	Clink	Dominique Darby	Series 1 (main role, 10 episodes)
2021	The Syndicate	Corinne	Series 4, episode 4
2021	Help	June	TV movie
2021	Casualty	Hannah Hargrove	Series 36, episode 15
2023	Waterloo Road	Marie Lewis	Series 11, episode 6
2024	The Gathering	Nina	Series 1, episode 3

Film
Year	Title	Role	Notes
1999	Everybody Loves Sunshine	Sandra	Uncredited
1999	G:MT – Greenwich Mean Time	Bobby	
1999	Tube Tales	Shantel	Segment: "Grasshopper"
2000	The Low Down	Paul Girl	
2015	Chance	Non-acting work	(Second unit director, executive producer)
2015	Brace (Note: Brace was also featured on the anthology film Boys on Film 14: Worlds Collide, released in 2016.)	Nurse Gregory	Short (also director)
2018	The Tables Turn	Grace	Short
2022	1 in 200	Samantha Hutchinson	
