= Isabelle Amyes =

English actress (born 1950)

- Born: 13 June 1950 (age 75); Grappenhall, Warrington, England
- Other name: Isabelle Amyles
- Occupations: Actress, writer
- Years active: 1975–present

Isabelle Amyes (born 13 June 1950) is an English actress best known for her role as Barbara Hunt in the British TV drama Bad Girls from 2000 to 2003. Another prominent role was as Fanny in Love in a Cold Climate (1980). Her various guest appearances on other television programmes include The New Statesman, House of Cards, The Darling Buds of May, A Touch of Frost and As Time Goes By. From 2012 to 2013, she portrayed Barbara Land in the BBC soap opera Doctors.

== Filmography ==
Year	Title	Role	Notes
1974	Intimate Strangers	Judith Carr	Series 1 (recurring, 5 episodes)
1975	General Hospital	Nurse Patsy Tyley	Soap opera (guest, 11 April 1975)
1975	Poldark	Joan Pascoe	Series 1 (guest, #1.5)
1976	Dickens of London	Anne Beadnell	Miniseries (guest, episode 4)
1976	The Laundrette	Girl	TV movie
1977	Eleanor Marx	Lillian Richardson	Miniseries (guest, episode 3)
1977	Nicholas Nickleby	Miss Fanny Squeers	Miniseries (supporting, 3 episodes)
1977	Marie Curie	Irene Curie	Miniseries (guest, episode 5)
1978	Enemy at the Door	Librarian	Series 1 (guest, #1.6)
1978	Armchair Thriller	Julie Villers	Series 1 (recurring, 4 episodes)
1978	Crown Court	WDC Noreen Banks	Series 7 (guest, #7.46)
1980	Love in a Cold Climate	Fanny	Miniseries (main, 7 episodes)
1983	Floating Off	Vera	TV movie
1983	Angels	Staff Nurse Hobbs	Series 9 (guest, #9.8 & #9.9)
1984	Miracles Take Longer	Paula's Client	Series 1 (guest, #1.21)
1984	The Country Diary of an Edwardian Lady	Winnie Holden	Miniseries (main, 10 episodes)
1986	Dramarama	Schoolteacher	Series 4 (guest, #4.2)
1987	The New Statesman	Lady Virginia	Series 1 (guest, #1.3)
1988	The Attic: The Hiding of Anne Frank	Elli Vossen	TV movie
1989	Tom's Midnight Garden	Aunt Gwen	Miniseries (main, all 6 episodes)
1990	House of Cards	Anne Collingridge	Miniseries (supporting, 3 episodes)
1992	The Bill	Barbara White	Series 8 (guest, #8.65)
1992	Casualty	Mrs. Partington	Series 7 (guest, #7.4)
1993	The Darling Buds of May	Diane Parker	Series 3 (guest, #3.5 & #3.6)
1994	A Touch of Frost	Angela Newcombe	Series 2 (guest, #2.2)
1995	The Famous Five	Mrs. Leonor	Series 1 (guest, #1.12 & #1.13)
1995	Sense and Sensibility	Betsy	Feature Film
1998	The Round Tower	Irene Brett	Miniseries
1998	As Time Goes By	Ruth Duncan	Series 7 (guest, #7.3)
1998	The Things You Do for Love: Black Butterflies	Mother	TV movie
2000–03	Bad Girls	Barbara Hunt	Series 2–5 (main, 52 episodes)
2002	Harry Potter and the Chamber of Secrets	Mrs. Mason	
2004	My Parents are Aliens	Mrs. Hogarth	Series 6 (guest, #6.18)
2005	Doctors	Emily	Soap opera; Series 7 (guest, #7.7)
2006	Switch	Doctor	Series 4 (guest, #4.2)
2007	Casualty	Pearl Simmons	Series 21 (guest, #21.31)
2008	Lady Godiva	Mrs. Bartle	Feature film
2008	The Bill	Judge	Series 24 (guest, #24.11 & #24.12)
2009	Coming Home	Maureen	Short TV movie
2009	Doctors	Maureen Bagshaw	Series 11 (guest, #11.47)
2012–2013	Doctors	Barbara Land	Series 14–15 (recurring, 10 episodes)
2017	Casualty	Mrs. Clarke	Series 32 (guest, #32.14)
2017–2018	Knightfall	Mother Superior	Series 1 (guest, #1.4 & #1.7)
2017	Jessamine	Olivia	Short film
2018	Brothers of Italy	Mrs. Henderson	Short film
