= Kika Mirylees =

English actress (born 1953)

- Born: Christina Kika Le Fleming Mirylees; 23 September 1953 (age 72); South Africa
- Occupations: Actress, town councillor
- Years active: 1980–present

Kika Mirylees (born Christina Kika Le Fleming Mirylees; 23 September 1953) is a South African-born British actress and councillor. She is best known for her roles as Fliss in Not Going Out and Julie Johnston in Bad Girls, Doc Newton in Red Dwarf and Hazel Hobbs in EastEnders.

== Acting career ==
Mirylees played Angela Snow in The Darling Buds of May, Flora McInnes in Strathblair, and Doc Newton in Red Dwarf. Her guest roles include Zola Zbzewski in Jonathan Creek, Sylvana Watson in Taggart, Maria Huntly in The Bill, and Barbara Wells in Casualty. In the 1980s she played Carinna in Lovejoy. Mirylees is also known for her role as Julie Johnston in Bad Girls. She played the role from the first episode, in 1999, to the final episode, in December 2006. On 5 January 2007, it was announced on GMTV that Mirylees had joined EastEnders as Hazel Hobbs, the mother of Garry. She made her first appearance in the soap on 10 April 2007 and her last on 24 April 2008. In late 2007, she appeared in an episode of the sitcom Not Going Out as a snobby character called Fliss.

Mirylees starred in Holby City in 2009. She also worked for Tristan Versluis' directorial debut, Not Alone. In March 2020, she appeared in an episode of the BBC soap opera Doctors as Isa Auld.

== Political career ==
She is a councillor for Waverley Borough Council. She represents Farnham Firgrove for the Farnham Residents Association.

== Personal life ==
Mirylees lives in Farnham, Surrey.

== Theatre ==
Year	Title	Role	Company	Director	Notes
1994	The Big Picnic	Miss Fensom	Promenade Productions	Bill Bryden	play by Bill Bryden staged at Harland and Wolff, Govan

== Filmography ==
Year	Title	Role	Notes
1980	Between the Covers	Flora	Television film
1980	Shoestring	Katrina Dalrymple	Episode: "Room with a View"
1983	Howard Jones New Song	Performer in Music Video	
1986	Lovejoy	Carinna	Episode: "The Sting"
1986	C.A.T.S. Eyes	Receptionist	Episode: "Rough Trip"
1986	Call Me Mister	Marcia	Episode: "Running Time"
1987	Taggart	Sylvana Watson	2 episodes
1987	Shadow in a Landscape	Renee Honta	Television film
1988	The Play on One	Morag Stevenson	Episode: "Unreported Incident"
1990	The Bill	Maria Huntly	2 episodes
1991–1992	The Darling Buds of May	Angela Snow	7 episodes
1992–1993	Strathblair	Flora McInnes	20 episodes
1994	Class Act	Lucy Harcourt	
1994	A Man You Don't Meet Every Day	Caroline	
1996	Canary Wharf	Andrea Cavendish	Episode: "Last Minute Nerves"
1997	Jonathan Creek	Zola Zbzewski	Episode: "The Reconstituted Corpse"
1998	Hilary and Jackie	Patron	
1999	Red Dwarf	Doc Newton	Episodes: "Back in the Red" (Parts 1&2)
1999	People Like Us		Episode: "The Solicitor"
1999–2006	Bad Girls	Julie Johnston	96 episodes
2001	South West 9	Annie	
2004	Provenance	Sandie	Short film
2005	Casualty	Barbara Wells	Episode: "Big Bang Theory"
2007	Not Going Out	Fliss	Episode: "Art"
2007–2008	EastEnders	Hazel Hobbs	47 episodes
2009	Holby City	Selena Dighton	Episode: "Truth and Mercy"
2011	Doctors	Kirsty Haldon	Episode: "Kings and Queens"
2013	New Tricks	Orla Ransley	Episode: "Things Can Only Get Better"
2014	Moving On	Sheila	Episode: "Madge"
2015	Not Alone	Rose	
2015	Holby City	Angela Williams	Episode: "Bad Blood, Fake Snow"
2015	Doctors	Paula Simms	Episode: "Long Lost"
2018	Mum	Lyn	Episode: "April"
2020	Doctors	Isa Auld	Episode: "Privilege"
