= Tracey Wilkinson =

English actress

Tracey Wilkinson is an English actress from the North East of the country primarily known for her role as Di Barker in the series Bad Girls.

Her acting CV includes a number of productions set in and filmed in the region, including the films Billy Elliot and Purely Belter (both 2000) and the BBC TV drama series Our Friends in the North (1996).

She also appeared in the Inspector George Gently episode "Gently in the Night" as Margaret Bishop, and in Jimmy McGovern's 1996 television film Hillsborough as Jan Spearritt.

She joined the prison drama Bad Girls in Series 2 as a caring prison officer new to G-Wing. By the end of her time on the programme in Series 7, Di was herself behind bars in the prison in which she had served as an officer, accused of murdering her second husband, corrupt Wing Governor Jim Fenner (Jack Ellis) – though she was in fact innocent of the crime. Wilkinson left Bad Girls between the filming of the 2005 Christmas Special (now established as an additional episode to Series 7) and the beginning of Series 8, and the fate of Di (last seen on remand for Jim's murder) remained unresolved.

Wilkinson also made appearances in Starz's TV programme Outlander, portraying Reverend Mr Wakefield's housekeeper, Mrs Graham.

In September 2016 Wilkinson appeared on Casualty as Jackie Munroe (married to Howard Munroe, portrayed by former on-screen husband James Gaddas, who played Neil Grayling in Bad Girls), the mother of regular character Alicia Munroe (Chelsea Halfpenny).

Later she portrayed Lorraine in Sink (2019), written and directed by Mark Gillis.

Further roles include Amazon Prime's Carnival Row (2020), playing the part of Afissa and in the British drama film Give Them Wings (2022).

She also acts on stage for the Royal Court, the National Theatre and the Royal Shakespeare Company.

== Filmography ==
Film
| Year | Title | Role | Director |
|---|---|---|---|
| 1987 | Little Dorrit | Housemaid | Christine Edzard |
| 1998 | Titanic Town | Lucy | Roger Michell |
| 2000 | Purely Belter | Mrs. Caird | Mark Herman |
| 2000 | Billy Elliot | Geography Teacher | Stephen Daldry |
| 2000 | Married 2 Malcolm | Norma | James Cellan Jones |
| 2011 | Peter | Jan | Skip Kite |
| 2014 | Almost Married | Wendy | Ben Cookson |
| 2018 | Sink | Lorraine | Mark Gillis |
| 2020 | Drive Me to the End | Louisa Jackson | Richard Summers-Calvert |
| 2021 | Give Them Wings | Marion Carter | Sean Cronin |

Television
| Year | Title | Role | Notes |
|---|---|---|---|
| 1984 | Coronation Street | Delivery Girl | Episode 2429 |
| 1984 | Travelling Man | Girl | Series 1, Episode 5 |
| 1985 | The Practice | Cheryl | Series 1, Episodes 17, 18 & 19 |
| 1988 | Screen Two | Student Nurse | Series 4, Episode 6 |
| 1988–89 | Playbus | Presenter | Series 1, Episodes 3, 9, 14 & 15; Series 2, Episode 11 |
| 1989 | A Day in Summer | Mrs. Thickness | TV movie |
| 1994 | True Crimes | Reenactment | Series 2, Episode 6 |
| 1996 | Our Friends in the North | Elaine Craig/Cox | Miniseries (episodes 6, 8 & 9) |
| 1996 | The Bill | Janet Tate | Series 12, Episode 44 |
| 1996 | Hillsborough | Jan Spearritt | TV movie |
| 1997 | Kavanagh QC | Patricia Linzey | Series 3, Episode 2 |
| 1997 | The Bill | Ellen Naughton | Series 13, Episode 46 |
| 1997 | Rag Nymph | Nellie | Miniseries (all 3 episodes) |
| 1997 | Casualty | Abby Fisher | Series 12, Episode 6 |
| 1997 | Heartbeat | Molly Ainsworth | Series 7, Episode 10 |
| 1998 | Big Cat | Sylvia | TV movie |
| 1998–99 | Grafters | Karen | Series 1, Episodes 1, 2 & 4; Series 2, Episode 1 |
| 2000 | Holby City | Michelle Jenkins | Series 2, Episode 11 |
| 2000–05 | Bad Girls | Di Barker/Fenner | Series 2–7 (76 episodes; main role) |
| 2003 | The Brides in the Bath | Edith Smith | TV movie |
| 2007 | After You've Gone | Florist | Series 2, Episode 5 |
| 2008 | The Bill | Judy Henshaw | Series 24, Episodes 62 & 63 |
| 2009 | Inspector George Gently | Margaret Bishop | Series 2, Episode 2 |
| 2009 | Doctors | Marjorie Walsh | Series 11, Episode 141 |
| 2010 | Toast | Sheila | TV movie |
| 2012 | Doctors | Lyn Goodwin | Series 14, Episode 75 |
| 2014–16 | Outlander | Mrs. Graham | Series 1, Episodes 1, 8 & 10; Series 2, Episode 1 |
| 2016–17 | Casualty | Jackie Munroe | Series 31, Episodes 2 & 20 |
| 2019–23 | Carnival Row | Afissa | 13 episodes |
| 2026 | Lady Grace Mysteries | Mrs. Champrnowne | 7 episodes |
