= Bad Girls series 7 =

Bad Girls
- Season 7
- Re-release Region 2 DVD
- Starring: Jack Ellis; Tracey Wilkinson; Helen Fraser; Tristan Sturrock; Liz May Brice; Dannielle Brent
- No. of episodes: 13

Release
- Original network: ITV
- Original release: 10 May – 19 December 2005

Series chronology
- ← Previous; Series 6 Next → Series 8

The seventh series of British drama series Bad Girls premiered on ITV on 10 May 2005. The series concluded on 19 December 2005 with a Christmas special. Series seven consists of thirteen episodes.

This series sees the departure of several of its regular cast, including Tristan Sturrock, Philip McGough, Tracey Wilkinson, and Jack Ellis. The sixth series was intended to be Ellis's last; however, he agreed to return for one last series. It also marks the final series for James Gaddas as a regular cast member, as he returned at the beginning of the eighth series in a guest role.

The seventh series also sees the introduction of Nicola Stapleton (Janine Nebeski), Rebecca Hazlewood (Arun Palmer), Liz May Brice (Pat Kerrigan), Laura Rogers (Sheena Williams), Andrew Scarborough (Kevin Spiers) and Ellie Haddington (Joy Masterton).

A storyline that concluded the previous series, involving the fate of Kris Yates (Jennifer Ness) and Selena Geeson (Charlotte Lucas), was not resolved, nor were the characters mentioned.

== Storylines ==
The series picks up several weeks following the revelation that Fenner had framed Karen Betts in the hit-and-run. Fenner, now convicted for his crime, is struggling to come to terms with his new surroundings and is targeted by the other prisoners as they know that he is an ex-screw. Following an attack in the shower block, Fenner requests to be moved to segregation for his protection. Meanwhile at Larkhall, It is revealed that Frances Myers has become the new governing governor of Whitehouse Prison; Neil announces that he will be taking on full responsibility of G-wing, as they are short staffed and offers Colin the position of senior officer in Fenner's absence. Tina, having been recently released, finds it difficult to adjust to life on the outside, and is upset that Ben was not waiting for her and that she is not pregnant; she makes a desperate attempt to be sent back to Larkhall and successfully gets what she wants after setting fire to a clothes shop. The Two Julies are eager to make contact with Tina and are told by Ben that Tina wants nothing to do with her past, and subsequently discover that he is having an affair with Buxton. Neil, with the help of the Julies, make the discovery that Ben works in different jobs under two different names within the prison and upon finding Ben with Natalie, Ben is arrested and placed in the same prison as Fenner. Fenner sees this an opportunity to frame Ben for his crime. Two new prisoners, Janine Nabeski and Arun Parmar, arrive on G-wing, and Janine is determined to make Arun suffer for confessing their crimes in court. Fenner, having revealed to Di that he did, in fact, steal Karen's car on the night of the hit-and-run tries to convince her that he loves her and wants to start a family. Di, in two minds, decides to help him and they frame Ben for Fenner's crime. Fenner is eventually released and reinstated as G-wing governor. Now that Fenner has become governor, he sets new ground rules for the inmates. Natalie, having intimidated the other women, now holds the position of top dog and has set her own rules. With the help of Darlene, Natalie forces the other inmates to pay tax by handing all their possessions over to her in order to receive her "protection". Janine, in fear, is keen to get on Natalie's good side after Natalie stabs her in the eye with a pin. As Fenner and Natalie's illicit affair continues, he moves her up to enhanced and gives her a job in the library in order to keep her sweet so that she does not reveal their affair to Di. However, Di and Natalie soon come to blows when Di becomes suspicious. Sylvia receives some good news when she discovers that her recently deceased Aunt Margaret has left her a house and a large sum of money, which gives Malcolm the perfect opportunity to get his hands on it by proposing to her. When Sylvia becomes aware that, in order to receive the money, she must stay single, she finds it difficult to reveal the news to Malcolm.

When new prisoner Laura Canning arrives G-wing, she is met with hatred by the other inmates, as she has been convicted of stabbing her mother 27 times to death, while the whereabouts of her older sister are unknown. Colin tries to understand why Laura has committed the crime, and it is revealed that Laura was bullied by both her sister and mother. Colin finally gets Laura to open up about her sister's whereabouts. Laura's sister is found alive and Laura commits suicide. An elderly nun, Sister Thomas, arrives on G-wing convicted of fraud. While trying to convince everyone that she did not intend to keep the stolen charity money for herself, she does win the hearts of the other inmates, except Natalie, who attacks her. The women become convinced that they have found God through Sister Thomas and together they work on completing a charity blanket, which is to be donated to the Little Sisters of the Poor to raise money for AIDS victims in Africa. Arun reveals to Sister Thomas that she used to be a man when Arun's visitor is caught trying to smuggle in hormone medication, and she is put on cellular confinement when she refuses to divulge what the medication is. When new prisoner Pat Kerrigan, convicted of murdering her abusive boyfriend, arrives at Larkhall, she takes Sister Thomas hostage. It is soon revealed that Sister Thomas used to work at a home for young girls, including Pat and her friend, Lucy, and that they were abused by Sister Thomas and a priest, Father Kelly. When Father Kelly is forced to go to Larkhall, the truth comes out that they are both guilty. While Pat becomes a hero to the victims who suffered at the hands of Sister Thomas and Father Kelly, she makes several friends when she is met with a warm reception from the other inmates once she has returned from cellular confinement. When it is discovered by the women that Arun was once a man, Neil takes it into consideration whether or not to send her to a man's prison with protests from the inmates. While the women continue to bully Arun, Pat threatens Natalie to back off and the pair get into a brutal fight. When Pat beats Natalie down, not only does Arun get to remain at Larkhall, but also Pat becomes top dog in the process.

== Cast ==
=== Main ===
- Jack Ellis as Jim Fenner
- Tracey Wilkinson as Di Barker
- Helen Fraser as Sylvia Hollamby
- Tristan Sturrock as Colin Hedges
- Liz May Brice as Pat Kerrigan
- Dannielle Brent as Natalie Buxton
- Antonia Okonma as Darlene Cake
- Victoria Bush as Tina O'Kane
- James Gaddas as Neil Grayling
- Stephanie Beacham as Phyl Oswyn
- Amanda Barrie as Bev Tull
- Nicola Stapleton as Janine Nabeski
- Rebecca Hazlewood as Arun Palmer
- Laura Rogers as Sheena Williams
- Andrew Scarborough as Kevin Spiers
- Victoria Alcock as Julie Saunders
- Kika Mirylees as Julie Johnston
- Philip McGough as Malcolm Nicholson
- Ellie Haddington as Joy Masterton

=== Recurring ===
- Colette O'Neil - Sister Thomas Moore
- Gaynor Howe as Christy Mackay
- Francesca Fowler as Laura Canning
- Nicola Redmond as Miranda Miles
- Paul Henry as Frank
- Joanna Brookes as Denise
- Louis Waymouth as Bobby Darren Hollamby
- Richard Mylan as Benjamin Phillips
- Orlessa Altass as Vicky Floyd

=== Guest ===
- Frank McCusker as Miller
- Jude Akuwudike as Leroy
- Christine Furness as Waitress
- Jonnie Hum as Andy
- Dave Hill as Ron
- Claire-Louise Cordwell as Shop assistant
- Mika Simmons as Di Kitson
- Daniel Hill as Dr Nelson
- Nicky Henson as Hugo
- Jaimi Barbakoff as Sales assistant
- Ashlie Walker as Emily Canning
- Terence Harvey as Derek
- John Cater as Solicitor
- Pauline Whittaker as Principal Officer
- James Ellis as Father Kelly
- Malcolm Scales as Bob Webster
- Angela McHale as Nurse
- Richard Gaisford as Reporter
- Ross O'Hennessy as Security agent
- Romolo Bruni as Paco
- Rad Lazar as Mikhail
- Robert Cambrinus as Sergei
- Emma Jerrold as Collette
- Robyn Burry as Jen
- Lucy Alexander as Newsreader
- Sudha Bhuchar as Magistrate
- Jonathon Finley as Clerk of the Court
- David Gwillim as Mr. Fergus
- Orlando Vitorini as Spanish clerk
- Teddy Kempner as Jeweller
- Tony Slattery as DI Alan Hayes
- Lucy O'Connell as DS Caroline Hook
- Clara Salaman as Pathologist
- Ravi Kothakota as Constable
- Graham Christopher as Court Clerk
- Antony Gabriel as Prosecution Lawyer
- Patrick Pearson as Mr. Davis
- Karen Meagher as Magistrate
- Alby Jones as Mark
- Phillip Lester as Clive
- Aoife McMahon as Frankie
- Daniella Dessa as Iga Lukasiak
- Seeta Indrani as Consultant
- Alastair Southey as Brendan
- Elizabeth Banks as Journalist
- Candida Gubbins as Dr Henderson
- Michael Fish as himself

== Episodes ==
No. overall	No. in series	Title	Directed by	Written by	Original release date	UK viewers (millions)
84	1	"Episode One"	Julian Holmes	Phil Ford	10 May 2005	6.21
Fenner discovers that life behind bars is no picnic for a former PO when he finds himself on the receiving end of some very rough justice from his fellow inmates. Natalie takes over as Top Dog and starts a protection racket with the help of Darlene. New arrivals Janine Nebeski and Arun Parmar arrive on G-Wing and suffer at the hands of Natalie. The Julies give Bev a makeover. Sylvia falls victim to voodoo. Note: first appearances of Janine Nebeski (Nicola Stapleton) and Arun Parmar (Rebecca Hazlewood)
85	2	"Episode Two"	Julian Holmes	Liz Lake	17 May 2005	6.05
Fenner returns to Larkhall as the new Governor of G-Wing. Sylvia receives some unexpected and fortuitous news that soon has her jumping for joy. On overhearing the rumours of her windfall, greedy Dr Malcolm Nicholson suddenly finds her irresistible. The Julies are sacked from the servery and replaced by Phyl and Bev.
86	3	"Episode Three"	Lance Kneeshaw	Polly Eden	24 May 2005	5.64
Fenner reveals the truth about an attack on him in prison. Natalie is ruling the roost on G-Wing and it seems that everyone is in her debt. She even has a cushy job working in the library, which serves as the perfect place to set up a trap for Arun. Di slaps Natalie, following a set up by Janine.
87	4	"Episode Four"	Lance Kneeshaw	Phil Ford	31 May 2005	5.05
Outside the gates of Larkhall, a swarm of press await the arrival of 18-year-old Laura Canning, who has been convicted of brutally stabbing her mother to death. Fenner has a vasectomy, telling Di he is having counselling after being raped. Di returns to Larkhall and warns Natalie to watch her back. Darlene pays the price for making thoughtless remarks about Julie S's breast cancer.
88	5	"Episode Five"	Laurence Moody	Liz Lake	7 June 2005	4.84
When an elderly nun called Sister Thomas Moore arrives at Larkhall, Natalie takes it upon herself to show her that the habit offers no protection from the evil on G-Wing and beats her up. A solicitor reveals the condition to Sylvia on her aunt's will. Di plants scissors in Natalie's cell. Arun hides away from the wing to keep her secret hidden. Note: first appearance of Pat Kerrigan (Liz May Brice)
89	6	"Episode Six"	Laurence Moody	Liz Lake	14 June 2005	5.56
A new tough inmate, Pat Kerrigan, is transferred to Larkhall from another prison and she is more than a match for Natalie. However, the focus of Pat's attention is the saintly Sister Thomas Moore. Sylvia fears that she could lose Malcolm if she does not tell him the truth about her aunt's will, and so they go ahead with the wedding. Neil has sex with Sylvia's son Bobby Darren. Natalie reveals Arun's secret. Note: final appearance of Colin Hedges (Tristan Sturrock)
90	7	"Episode Seven"	S.J. Clarkson	Paul Mousley	21 June 2005	5.18
Arun is suicidal. The thought of being transferred to a men's prison is intolerable. Pat is furious that Natalie's taunts have driven Arun to despair and steps in to defend her. Di visits the MBU and convinces a mother, Sheena Williams, to give her baby to her. The salon is closed and the Julies return to the servery. Note: first appearance of Kevin Spiers (Andrew Scarborough)
91	8	"Episode Eight"	S.J. Clarkson	Jane Marlow	28 June 2005	4.80
Arun's transfer is cancelled following Pat and Natalie's fight. Tina discovers Phyl and Bev's deceit. Di's marriage is in meltdown. Fenner cannot believe that his wife has taken baby Dylan from his mother, especially as she does not even know the first thing about looking after a baby.
92	9	"Episode Nine"	Lance Kneeshaw	Paul Mousley	5 July 2005	5.51
Di and Fenner's marriage is over when he discovers her deceit. Bev is quick to the rescue when sleazy delivery man Frank attempts to rape Phyl. Her daring actions prove doubly fortunate when they suddenly realise that they are staring freedom in the face. They kidnap Tina and tie her in the back of the delivery van, as she witnessed Bev hit Frank. They also face Sylvia and Malcolm when they arrive in Spain. They find Malcolm getting ready to inject Sylvia with a deadly substance, so Phyl shoots Malcolm with a gun she found, killing him.
93	10	"Episode Ten"	Laurence Moody	Polly Eden	12 July 2005	5.78
It looks as if Fenner is about to get his comeuppance. He is the only PO present in the hanging cell when the girls of G-Wing go to lay flowers in memory of Yvonne – will a prisoner or a fellow screw get their revenge on evil Fenner? Bev returns to Larkhall and is attacked by Natalie, while Phyl remains on the run.
94	11	"Episode Eleven"	Declan O'Dwyer	Phil Ford	19 July 2005	5.58
The atmosphere at Larkhall is euphoric – Jim Fenner is dead. However, the arrival of new Governing Governor Joy Masterton soon spoils the mood. She is ex-army, hard as nails, and set on a big shake up. Phyl is returned to Larkhall and faces the wrath of Joy. Natalie impresses Joy and could finally get her weekend release. The entire wing own up to Fenner's murder, though the police are convinced Di did it. Note: first appearance of Joy Masterton (Ellie Haddington)
95	12	"Episode Twelve"	Jim Loach	Paul Mousley	26 July 2005	5.49
Having been charged with Fenner's murder, Di requests to be sent to Larkhall when she cannot afford the bail settlement and learns the true identity of the killer. Natalie attempts to escape while out for the day but is stopped by a mob, organised by Pat. To get over the heartache of Sheena's release, Pat leads Natalie into a trap that could jeopardise her appeal but Sheena's release is short lived. Julie J begins to crack when she attacks both Joy and Julie S and then starts seeing Fenner.
96	13	"Episode Thirteen"	Martin Hutchings	Paul Mousley	19 December 2005	7.16
Julie S is thrilled that Julie J has been allowed to return to Larkhall. However, Julie J is still haunted by the memory of Fenner, and is convinced that she can see him lurking around the landings and stabs herself in the stomach. New inmate Miranda Miles worsens the atmosphere when prison Chaplain Christy Mackay is convinced she is possessed, and pleads with Joy to let her perform an exorcism. Sylvia suffers a panic attack while down in the cellar with Phyl and falls down the steps, blocking the door and leaving Phyl trapped. Natalie manipulates Miranda into murdering Christy. Note: final appearances of Jim Fenner (Jack Ellis), Di Barker (Tracey Wilkinson), Arun Parmar (Rebecca Hazlewood), Kevin Spiers (Andrew Scarborough) and Sheena Williams (Laura Rogers)

== Reception ==
=== Ratings ===
No.	Title	Air date	Timeslot	Weekly ratings		Consolidated ratings		Total viewers	Ref(s)
No.	Title	Air date	Timeslot	Viewers	Rank	Viewers	Rank	Total viewers	Ref(s)
1	Episode 1	10 May 2005	Tuesday 9:00 pm	5,706,000	17	504,000		6,210,000	
2	Episode 2	17 May 2005	Tuesday 9:00 pm	5,546,000	19	504,000		6,050,000	
3	Episode 2	24 May 2005	Tuesday 9:00 pm	5,143,000	17	497,000		5,640,000	
4	Episode 4	31 May 2005	Tuesday 9:00 pm	4,445,000	22	605,000		5,050,000	
5	Episode 5	7 June 2005	Tuesday 9:00 pm	4,340,000	23	500,000		4,840,000	
6	Episode 6	14 June 2005	Tuesday 9:00 pm	5,064,000	16	496,000		5,560,000	
7	Episode 7	21 June 2005	Tuesday 9:00 pm	4,682,000	17	498,000		5,180,000	
8	Episode 8	28 June 2005	Tuesday 9:00 pm	4,295,000	20	505,000		4,800,000	
9	Episode 9	5 July 2005	Tuesday 9:00 pm	5,006,000	18	504,000		5,510,000	
10	Episode 10	12 July 2005	Tuesday 9:00 pm	5,280,000	18	500,000		5,780,000	
11	Episode 11	19 July 2005	Tuesday 9:00 pm	5,080,000	17	500,000		5,580,000	
12	Episode 12	26 July 2005	Tuesday 9:00 pm	4,990,000	17	500,000		5,490,000	
13	Episode 13	19 December 2005	Monday 9:00 pm	6,660,000	17	500,000		7,160,000	

=== Awards and nominations ===
- Inside Soap Awards – Best Drama (Won)
- National Television Awards – Most Popular Drama (Nomination)

== Home media ==
The original 'Series Seven' DVD on Region 4 Australia from Shock Records continuing its own unique cover art which differs from the UK cover art as Shock has used the same art as the UK for the previous series'

Original UK release

United Kingdom

- "Series Seven" – 7 August 2006 (4-DVD set distributed by 2 Entertain)
  - "The Complete Series Seven" re-release – 20 February 2012 (3-DVD set distributed by Acorn Media)
  - As part of "The Complete Collection" – 2 July 2012 (28-DVD set distributed by Acorn Media)

Australia

- "Series Seven" – 18 September 2006 (4-DVD set distributed by Shock Records)
  - As part of "The Complete Collection" – 10 November 2010 (32-DVD set distributed by Shock Records)
  - "Series Seven" re-release (individual from "The Complete Collection") – 11 May 2011 (3-DVD set distributed by Shock Records)
