= Bad Girls series 6 =

Bad Girls
- Season 6
- Re-Release Region 2 DVD
- Starring: Eva Pope; Charlotte Lucas; Tristan Sturrock; Jennifer Ness; Dannielle Brent; Jack Ellis
- No. of episodes: 12

Release
- Original network: ITV
- Original release: 14 April – 23 August 2004

Series chronology
- ← Previous; Series 5 Next → Series 7

The sixth series of British drama series Bad Girls premiered on 14 April 2004. It consists of twelve episodes. The first four episodes were broadcast on Wednesday nights, with episode five moved to Monday, followed by episodes six to eight being broadcast over consecutive nights beginning the following Monday. After an 11-week hiatus, due to UEFA Euro 2004, the remaining four episodes of the series were screened Monday nights and concluded on 23 August 2004.

This series introduces Eva Pope (Frances Myers), Dannielle Brent (Natalie Buxton) and Antonia Okonma (Darlene Cake), while Pauline Campbell (Al McKenzie), Charlotte Lucas (Selena Geeson) and Jennifer Ness (Kris Yates) depart the series. Special guest appearances include Claire King, returning for the final time as Karen Betts, and Zöe Lucker appearing as Tanya Turner in a crossover from Footballers' Wives.

== Storylines ==
The story picks up six weeks following Yvonne's death. Fenner is having recurring nightmares of Yvonne suffocating and struggling to get out of the hanging cell. The inmates are finally off lock down, restless, yet happy, believing that Yvonne has escaped. Kris, still determined to follow Yvonne's route to the hanging cell, needs the help of Selena if she is to make a successful escape. Meanwhile, two new prisoners arrive on G-wing; Frances Allen is in for prostitution, while Natalie Buxton claims she was sentenced for income tax fraud. When the other inmates discover that Natalie is in fact a sex trafficker, they are determined to make her suffer, despite telling them that she is innocent. Natalie enlists the help of Frances to protect her for a favor in return. It is later discovered that Natalie is in fact guilty and that Frances is an undercover police officer, Frances Myers and was sent to Larkhall expose her guilt. Natalie is transferred and Frances is made governor of G-Wing. The new position of wing governor causes friction between Di and Neil, as Di is forced to return to basic grade officer. Kris manages to find her way to the hanging cell only to make a shocking discovery. Now realising that there is no possible means of escape, she informs Selena that she has found Yvonne's body. Upon the news of Yvonne's death, the inmates, especially Julie Saunders, know that Fenner was behind it. Hell-bent on making him pay, Fenner becomes unstable, attacking inmates such as Kris Yates and exposing himself to the entire wing and is placed under the mental health act.

== Cast ==
=== Main ===
- Eva Pope as Frances Myers
- Charlotte Lucas as Selena Geeson
- Jack Ellis as Jim Fenner
- Tristan Sturrock as Colin Hedges
- Jennifer Ness as Kris Yates
- Dannielle Brent as Natalie Buxton
- Antonia Okonma as Darlene Cake
- Victoria Bush as Tina O'Kane
- Pauline Campbell as Al McKenzie
- James Gaddas as Neil Grayling
- Stephanie Beacham as Phyl Oswyn
- Amanda Barrie as Bev Tull
- Tracey Wilkinson as Di Barker
- Helen Fraser as Sylvia Hollamby
- Victoria Alcock as Julie Saunders
- Kika Mirylees as Julie Johnston
- Philip McGough as Malcolm Nicholson

=== Special guest ===
- Claire King as Karen Betts
- Zöe Lucker as Tanya Turner
- Meera Syal as Janan Hammad

=== Recurring ===
- Geff Francis as Rick Revoir
- Richard Mylan as Benjamin Phillips
- Nikki Amuka-Bird as Officer Paula Miles
- Holly Palmer as Milly Yates

=== Guest ===
- Adam Christopher as PO Jenkins
- Milo Twomey as Paul Knights
- David Baukham as DI Reign
- Janine Wood as Forensics officer
- David Fleeshman as DI Harwell
- Liam Noble as Officers' club barman
- Chrissie Cotterill as Sue Yates
- Gordon Peaston as PO Paddle
- Janice Acquah as Reporter
- Hebe Chitnis as Ishrat Hammad
- Margaret Blakemore as Female journalist
- Christopher Peacock as TV News reporter
- Stuart Organ as Duty Officer Smithson
- Gloria Onitri as Marcia
- Moshe Dennis as Terence Cake
- Jennifer MacDonald-Anderson as DST Officer
- Lisa Bowerman as Doctor
- Paul Brightwell as DI Ackroyd
- Carolyn Bazely as Dr. Lo
- Stephen Rahman Hughes as Stuart Jones
- Glyn Lewis as Security guard
- Fiona Gillies as Rosalind Oxborough
- David Yelland as Gregory Hedley
- Richard Walker as Judge
- Francis Magee as Rob Skelton
- June Page as Mrs. Welles
- Tim Frances as Sergeant Ledwell
- Anna Maria Ashe as Newsreader
- Don McCorkindale as Frank Twigg
- Carrie Davies as Registrar
- Jonathan Maitland as Reporter

== Episodes ==
No. overall	No. in series	Title	Directed by	Written by	Original release date	UK viewers (millions)
72	1	"Episode One"	Nigel Douglas	Di Burrows & Paul Mousley	14 April 2004	7.94
Selena has secretly cut keys so Kris can follow Yvonne's route out of the prison. It's not long before Kris is inching down the dark corridors – but what will she discover? Two new inmates arrive both hiding a secret, one deadlier than the other. Note: first appearances of Frances Myers (Eva Pope), Natalie Buxton (Dannielle Brent) and Darlene Cake (Antonia Okonma)
73	2	"Episode Two"	Nigel Douglas	Paul Mousley	21 April 2004	8.25
The new Wing Governor, Frances Myers, decides it is the right time to make herself known to the women of G-Wing, all of whom know her as inmate Frances Allen. The police investigate Yvonne's death and all fingers point to Fenner, who begins to crack under pressure. New inmate Darlene Cake makes herself noticed at Larkhall.
74	3	"Episode Three"	Ian Knox	Di Burrows & Jane Marlow	28 April 2004	7.51
Fenner is still reeling with guilt over Yvonne's death, and is convinced that her daughter is out for revenge, but real danger may be a lot closer than he realises. Frances begins to crack down on drugs when Bev takes an overdose and starts a war with Phyl after slapping her. Fenner finally breaks down.
75	4	"Episode Four"	Ian Knox	Di Burrows	5 May 2004	7.78
A Muslim woman convicted of murdering a relative maintains that she is innocent and climbs up on the roof of G-Wing to continue her protest, along with the Julies, Tina and Darlene. However, tragedy strikes when one of them falls from the roof top. Fenner returns to Larkhall to settle the score with Kris, and he is sectioned. Phyl throws a glass of water over Sylvia in anger.
76	5	"Episode Five"	Julian Holmes	Paul Mousley	10 May 2004	7.75
An unrepentant Natalie Buxton returns to Larkhall and is not a popular prisoner. Having been convicted of child prostitution, she has a lot to prove if she is going to survive on G-Wing. Frances and Colin grow closer but Colin wants more than just sex, although Frances has other plans. When Natalie confesses to being a sex trafficker, Frances slaps her in her office.
77	6	"Episode Six"	Julian Holmes	Paul Mousley	17 May 2004	7.87
Glamour hits Larkhall in the form of footballer's wife Tanya Turner when she arrives at the prison in a sweatbox. Jailed for possession of class A drugs, Tanya has got a tough time ahead of her on G-Wing, but she is on a mission to help a friend, Rick Revoir, get back at Darlene. The whole of G-Wing come down with poisoning but only Tina knows why. Al dies after being poisoned. Note: final appearance of Al Mackenzie (Pauline Campbell); first appearance of Tanya Turner (guest star Zöe Lucker)
78	7	"Episode Seven"	Ian White	Helen Eatock	18 May 2004	7.22
G-Wing is gripped with fear that the poisoner may strike again. The women are desperate to work out who is responsible and it is not long before all eyes fall on Tanya. When Tina reveals it is her, as she gave out the hooch, Phyl and Bev are desperate to keep out of the frame and out of Natalie's way when she gets nasty. Frances is struck down with the illness when she drinks a nasty cup of coffee. Fenner returns to G-Wing.
79	8	"Episode Eight"	Ian White	Phil Ford	19 May 2004	7.80
Frances gets into deep trouble when she is suddenly thrown into a violent and illegal plan to get to Tanya from the outside. Could her sex games have at last got her into some very hot water? Kris and Natalie grow closer, and Colin leaves to clear his head but only Julie S knows why. The Julies celebrate their birthday. Note final appearance of Tanya Turner (guest star Zöe Lucker)
80	9	"Episode Nine"	Nigel Douglas	Di Burrows	2 August 2004	6.27
Julie J is upset that Colin has gone and Julie S tells her why. Julie S goes for another scan and things start to look up. Selena returns with news about Kris's sister, Milly, and Natalie is determined to ruin Kris and Selena's relationship. Neil is worried about the impending tribunal for sexual misconduct and wonders whether his job and reputation will survive. Fenner has his own concerns. Could Di have jeopardised his case?
81	10	"Episode Ten"	Nigel Douglas	Paul Mousley	9 August 2004	5.92
Neil's career hangs in the balance, but he remains calm. He is determined to find ex-Wing Governor Karen Betts, convinced that she holds the key to bringing Fenner down. Kris attacks Natalie but Frances will not believe her. Note: guest starring Claire King as Karen Betts
82	11	"Episode Eleven"	Jim Loach	Liz Lake	16 August 2004	5.57
Tina gets close with a workman. Selena is in deep trouble. Frances has seen Fenner's evidence and knows that she and Kris used to live with each other. When a body is found in the canal, things look set to get even worse. Karen and Neil close in on Fenner when CCTV footage shows Fenner running from the scene of the accident.
83	12	"Episode Twelve"	Jim Loach	Phil Ford	23 August 2004	6.67
Tina believes she is pregnant, and asks Phyl and Bev to talk to the spirits. Tina and Darlene are then conned by Phyl and Bev into believing that Natalie made the rhubarb hooch that poisoned several inmates and killed Al McKenzie. Darlene then attacks Natalie and a huge catfight strikes G-Wing, although Natalie gets the upper hand and beats Darlene. Natalie, Phyl and Bev then team up to fool Darlene, with the help of voodoo. Selena and Kris spend a night together, under the condition that Kris turns herself in. Kris later flees the hotel to protest in London. Fenner is in seventh heaven as he and Di tie the knot, but when he sees Neil and Karen entering the reception clutching a big envelope, he goes cold with panic. Is this the end of the road for him? Note: final appearances of Selena Geeson (Charlotte Lucas), Kris Yates (Jennifer Ness), Frances Myers (Eva Pope) and Karen Betts (guest star Claire King) Note: this was originally supposed to be Jim Fenner's final appearance in the series, but Jack Ellis was convinced to return one last time, and so, in fact, left at the end of series 7.

== Reception ==
=== Ratings ===
No.	Title	Air date	Timeslot	Weekly ratings		Ref(s)
No.	Title	Air date	Timeslot	Viewers	Rank	Ref(s)
1	Episode 1	14 April 2004	Wednesday 9:00 pm	7,943,000	14	
2	Episode 2	21 April 2004	Wednesday 9:00 pm	8,250,000	13	
3	Episode 3	28 April 2004	Wednesday 9:00 pm	7,506,000	15	
4	Episode 4	5 May 2004	Wednesday 9:00 pm	7,782,000	11	
5	Episode 5	10 May 2004	Monday 9:00 pm	7,750,000	13	
6	Episode 6	17 May 2004	Monday 9:00 pm	7,865,000	11	
7	Episode 7	18 May 2004	Tuesday 9:00 pm	6,220,000	19	
8	Episode 8	19 May 2004	Wednesday 9:00 pm	7,796,000	12	
9	Episode 9	2 August 2004	Monday 9:00 pm	6,273,000	15	
10	Episode 10	9 August 2004	Monday 9:00 pm	5,921,000	15	
11	Episode 11	16 August 2004	Monday 9:00 pm	5,567,000	15	
12	Episode 12	23 August 2004	Monday 9:00 pm	6,669,000	12	

=== Awards and nominations ===
- National Television Awards (2004) – Most Popular Drama (Nominated)
- TV Quick Awards (2004) – Best Actor – Jack Ellis (Won)

== Home media ==
- United Kingdom
  - "Series Six" – 16 May 2005 (3-DVD set distributed by 2 Entertain)
  - "The Complete Series Six" re-release – 20 June 2005 (3-DVD set distributed by Acorn Media UK)
  - As part of "The Complete Collection" – 24 July 2006 (28-DVD set distributed by Acorn Media UK)
- Australia
  - "Series Six" – 4 July 2005 (3-DVD set distributed by Shock Records)
  - As part of "The Complete Collection" – 10 November 2010 (32-DVD set distributed by Shock Records)
  - "Series Six" re-release (individual from "The Complete Collection") – 11 May 2011 (3-DVD set distributed by Shock Records)

== Other media ==
On 23 August 2004, following the Series Six finale on ITV, a special, Bad Girls: Most Wanted was aired on ITV2 and hosted by Jack Ellis. The special counted down the top 10 most popular bad girls from the first six series. It also featured scenes from Bad Girls: The Musical and bloopers.

The top 10 bad girls are listed as follows:

- 10 – Tina O'Kane
- 9 – Julie Saunders and Julie Johnston: The Two Julies
- 8 – Natalie Buxton
- 7 – Phyl and Bev: The Costa Cons
- 6 – Denny Blood
- 5 – Kris Yates
- 4 – Darlene Cake
- 3 – Nikki Wade
- 2 – Shell Dockley
- 1 – Yvonne Atkins
