= Bad Girls series 8 =

Bad Girls
- Season 8
- Re-release Region 2 DVD
- Starring: Amanda Donohoe; Liz May Brice; Ellie Haddington; Helen Fraser; Dannielle Brent
- No. of episodes: 11

Release
- Original network: ITV
- Original release: 13 July – 20 December 2006

Series chronology
- ← Previous; Series 7

The eighth and final series of British drama series Bad Girls premiered on ITV on 13 July 2006. It consists of eleven episodes, and concluded with a Christmas special on 20 December 2006.

Series eight introduces Amanda Donohoe (Lou Stoke), Sid Owen (Donny Kimber), Colin Salmon (Rowan Dunlop) and Angela Bruce (Mandy Goodhue). James Gaddas appears for the final time as Neil Grayling in the first episode in a guest appearance. Tracey Wilkinson (Di Barker), Rebecca Hazlewood (Arun Palmer) and Andrew Scarborough (Kevin Spiers) are not featured and no explanation for their absence is given.

This series does not follow the previous series and commences with new storylines, leaving several from the previous season unresolved, including the fate of Di Barker.

== Cast ==
=== Main ===
- Amanda Donohoe as Lou Stoke
- Liz May Brice as Pat Kerrigan
- Ellie Haddington as Joy Masterton
- Helen Fraser as Sylvia Hollamby
- Dannielle Brent as Natalie Buxton (episodes 1–7)
- Antonia Okonma as Darlene Cake
- Victoria Bush as Tina O'Kane
- Stephanie Beacham as Phyl Oswyn
- Amanda Barrie as Bev Tull
- Nicola Stapleton as Janine Nabeski
- Sid Owen as Donny Kimber
- Colin Salmon as Rowan Dunlop
- Angela Bruce as Mandy Goodhue
- Victoria Alcock as Julie Saunders
- Kika Mirylees as Julie Johnston

=== Special guest ===
- James Gaddas as Neil Grayling (episode 1)
- Annette Badland as Angela Robbins (episode 3)
- Jan Francis as Catherine Earlham (episode 10)
- Dannielle Brent as Natalie Buxton (episode 11)

=== Recurring ===
- Laura Dos Santos as Emira Al Jahani (episodes 1, 2 & 3)
- Charlotte Eaton as Nurse Fitt (episodes 2, 4, 9 & 10)
- Melanie Cameron as Vicky Stoke (episodes 4, 5, 6, 8 & 9)
- Helen Modern as Stella Gough (episodes 4 & 5)
- Steven Webb as David Saunders (episodes 5, 6 & 11)
- Gugu Mbatha-Raw as Fidelity Saunders (episodes 6 & 11)
- Louis Waymouth as Bobby Darren Hollamby (episode 11)

=== Guest ===
- Conor Alexander as Hassan Al Jahani (episodes 1 & 3)
- Sandra de Sousa as Ashlee Wilcox (episode 1)
- Bill Buckhurst as Jack (episode 1)
- Andrew Forbes as D.I. Barrow (episode 1)
- Nadia Jordan as Gayle (episode 1)
- Christopher Rogers as Newsreader (episodes 1 & 2)
- Steve Swinscoe as Mr. Nebeski (episode 2)
- Samuel Oatley as Ian Nebeski (episode 2)
- Neil Conrich as D.I. Thackeray (episodes 2 & 3)
- Quill Roberts as Lawyer (episode 2)
- Sarah Akehurst as Call Girl (episode 2)
- Jon Carver as Sergeant Havers (episode 3)
- Rashid Karapiet as Imam (episode 3)
- Endy McKay as Sherie as (episode 4)
- Olivia Hurdle as Vanessa (episode 5)
- Emma Linley as Elizabeth (episode 5)
- Henrietta Meire as Tracey (episode 5)
- Simona Roman as Nurse (episode 5)
- Richard Syms as Humanist officiant (episode 6)
- Sally Tatum as Fidelity's friend (episode 6)
- John R. Walker as Natalie's accomplice (episode 6)
- Benjamin Cato as Binman (episode 6) / Ben Cato as Gary (episode 10)
- Lucy Bayler as Hannah Dunlop (episodes 7, 8 & 9)
- Abhin Galeya as Solicitor (episode 7)
- Annette Bentley as Maggie (episode 7)
- Cheryl Fergison as Latoya (episode 7)
- Pete Geddis as Ted (episode 7)
- Andrew Hilton as Judge Lloyd (episode 7)
- Murray Ewan as Mr. Fisk (episode 7)
- Ben Scotchbrook as Newsreader (episodes 7 & 8)
- Joseph Steyne as Prisoner (episode 7)
- Matthew Butler-Hart as Police Officer (episode 7)
- Leon Davies as Prison Officer (episode 7)
- Celia Bannerman as Mrs. Fisk (episode 8)
- Eddie Osei as George (episode 8)
- Fern Britton as herself (episode 10)
- Phillip Schofield as himself (episode 10)
- Gerry Hinks as Frank Earlham (episode 10)
- David Lumsden as Lawyer (episode 10)
- Dickon Tolson as Steve (episode 10)
- Paul Bridle as Brian (episode 11)

== Episodes ==
No. overall	No. in series	Title	Directed by	Written by	Original release date	UK viewers (millions)
97	1	"Episode One"	Barnaby Southcombe	Liz Lake	13 July 2006	5.40
New Deputy Governor Lou Stoke has her work cut out on her first day at Larkhall when a sudden illness starts striking down the inmates. As rumours of a chemical attack start to spread, panic sets in, and all fingers point to new inmate Emira Al Jahani who has been sent to Larkhall on suspicion of terrorism. Neil is found dead in his office following the sudden outbreak of Legionnaires' disease. Natalie's new right arm woman, Ashley Wilcox, is also found dead after contracting the same condition. Phyl is shot in a bid for freedom with Bev. Note: final appearance of Neil Grayling (James Gaddas); first appearances of Lou Stoke (Amanda Donohoe), Donny Kimber (Sid Owen), Rowan Dunlop (Colin Salmon) and Mandy Goodhue (Angela Bruce)
98	2	"Episode Two"	Barnaby Southcombe	Ann McManus & Maureen Chadwick	20 July 2006	4.47
Donny Kimber and Lou escort Janine to her mother's funeral, unaware that Natalie has blackmailed their grieving charge into smuggling drugs back into Larkhall. New SMO Rowan Dunlop records all his work with his patients and falls for Lou. Phyl and Bev blackmail Rowan into transferring her to an open hospital. Pat exacts revenge on Natalie, forcing drugs down her throat.
99	3	"Episode Three"	Lance Kneeshaw	Jodi Reynolds	27 July 2006	4.41
New arrival Angela Robbins has been sent down for arson and attempted murder. She looks like she would not say boo to a goose, but she is hiding a disturbing secret that is about to be revealed. Rowan and Lou grow closer and end up having sex. Also, Emira is freed from Larkhall after it is revealed that her husband, Hassan, was the real terrorist.
100	4	"Episode Four"	Lance Kneeshaw	Phil Ford	3 August 2006	4.18
Joy is delighted when inmate Stella Gough decides that she wants to join the army. However, is Stella being completely honest about why she wants to join up? Janine starts using drugs and falls for Donny. Lou finds her sister, Vicky, in a strip club and a catfight erupts.
101	5	"Episode Five"	Laurence Moody	Roxanne Harvey	10 August 2006	4.28
Julie S gets good news from her son. It gets steamy between Janine and Donny when they use an "appointment" to get to know each other a little more intimately. Will they manage to keep their romance under wraps? Items from the Four Bed Dorm are missing and Stella is the main suspect, so Darlene headbutts her. Phyl returns with plans to get alcohol into Larkhall, while Stella attacks Joy and is transferred. Natalie goes too far and Pat plots revenge, with the help of the Julies and Tina. Natalie attempts to force Julie S to reveal Pat's revenge plan by beating her up.
102	6	"Episode Six"	Laurence Moody	Paul Mousley	17 August 2006	4.87
Lou and Vicky fall out following Vicky's suicide bid. It is the day of David and Fidelity's wedding and Pat's plan to get rid of Natalie backfires dramatically. As a massive fight ensues, it quickly becomes clear that there is a bitter and bloody end in store for one of them. Joy takes leave when she starts abusing alcohol. Janine slaps Darlene when she begins stealing her love letters to Donny.
103	7	"Episode Seven"	Jim Loach	Liz Lake	24 August 2006	5.00
Tina is in court and hoping for an extended sentence. When the judge grants her release, she panics – she has absolutely no idea how to live on the outside. The Julies find Natalie and help Pat to hide her body.
104	8	"Episode Eight"	Jim Loach	Phil Ford	31 August 2006	4.56
Tina is returned to Larkhall and almost kills herself when she self harms. Vicky becomes a music teacher at Larkhall. Pat and the Julies are sweating over what to do with Natalie's dead body. They know they have to move it – a hot laundry is no place to hide a festering corpse.
105	9	"Episode Nine"	Jim Loach	Roxanne Harvey	7 September 2006	4.62
Lou is glowing after a surprise marriage proposal from Rowan. She is totally unaware that he has no intention of divorcing his wife, or that he is supplying her sister with drugs. Janine goes on a day visit to her mother's grave with Donny. The two get intimate and Janine attempts to free herself from Larkhall. Lou is sacked from Larkhall when she attacks Rowan. Note: final appearances of Lou Stoke (Amanda Donohoe) and Rowan Dunlop (Colin Salmon)
106	10	"Episode Ten"	Lance Kneeshaw	Harriet Warner	14 September 2006	4.98
A famous new inmate, entrepreneur and interior design goddess Catherine Earlham, decides to make Darlene a pawn in her twisted and dangerous game. Sylvia becomes acting G-Wing Governor, while Janine discovers she is pregnant but has to fool Joy into believing that her boyfriend "Michael" is responsible. Note: final appearances of Darlene Cake (Antonia Okonma) and Joy Masterton (Ellie Haddington)
107	11	"Episode Eleven"	Laurence Moody	Phil Ford	20 December 2006	5.13
It has been a tough Christmas Eve on G-Wing, but things look to get even worse when Sylvia receives a nightmare visit from her very own ghost of Christmas past – Natalie Buxton.

== Reception ==
=== Ratings ===
No.	Title	Air date	Timeslot	Weekly ratings		Ref(s)
No.	Title	Air date	Timeslot	Viewers	Rank	Ref(s)
1	Episode 1	13 July 2006	Thursday 9:00 pm	5,400,000	11	
2	Episode 2	20 July 2006	Thursday 9:00 pm	4,470,000	14	
3	Episode 3	27 July 2006	Thursday 9:00 pm	4,410,000	15	
4	Episode 4	3 August 2006	Thursday 9:00 pm	4,180,000	16	
5	Episode 5	10 August 2006	Thursday 9:00 pm	4,280,000	15	
6	Episode 6	17 August 2006	Thursday 9:00 pm	4,870,000	15	
7	Episode 7	24 August 2006	Thursday 9:00 pm	5,000,000	16	
8	Episode 8	31 August 2006	Thursday 9:00 pm	4,560,000	17	
9	Episode 9	7 September 2006	Thursday 9:00 pm	4,620,000	18	
10	Episode 10	14 September 2006	Thursday 9:00 pm	4,980,000	22	
11	Episode 11	20 December 2006	Wednesday 9:00 pm	5,130,000	16	

=== Awards nomination ===
- National Television Awards – Most Popular Drama (Nominated)

== Home media ==
The original 'Series Eight' DVD on Region 4 Australia from Shock Records continuing its own unique cover art which differs from the UK cover art as Shock has used the same art as the UK for first six series

Original UK DVD

United Kingdom

- "Series Eight" – 26 December 2006 (3-DVD set distributed by 2 Entertain)
  - As part of "Series Five to Eight" (14-DVD set distributed by 2 Entertain)
  - "The Complete Series Eight" re-release – 2 April 2012 (3-DVD set distributed by Acorn Media)
  - As part of "The Complete Collection" – 2 July 2012 (28-DVD set distributed by Acorn Media)

Australia

- "Series Eight" – 1 September 2007 (3-DVD set distributed by Shock Records)
  - As part of "The Complete Collection" – 10 November 2010 (32-DVD set distributed by Shock Records)
  - "Series Eight" re-release (individual from "The Complete Collection") – 1 June 2011 (3-DVD set distributed by Shock Records)
