= List of Bad Girls episodes =

Bad Girls is a British drama television series, created by Maureen Chadwick and Ann McManus, and produced by Shed Productions for ITV.

The series follows the lives of the prisoners and the staff within the fictional Larkhall prison's infamous G-wing. During the first three years of the series, exterior filming took place at HM Prison Oxford, located within Oxford Castle, before it was redeveloped into a hotel complex. A reconstruction of the prison's exterior was created and served as the filming location for the remainder of the series. The interior was a replica set of Oxford Prison's wing. Outside of its original filming location, several scenes took place around the London district, as well as scenes shot in Spain, Amsterdam and Peru.

The series was initially available on VHS, before being released several times in it entirety on DVD. Due to its success, it has been repeated on other British television channels, including ITV2, ITV3, Five Life, CBS Drama, CBS Action and Drama. It was also available to stream on services UKTV Play, BritBox, Amazon Freevee, and currently ITVX

During the course of the programme, 107 episodes of Bad Girls aired over eight series, between 1 June 1999 and 20 December 2006.

== Series overview ==
| Series | Episodes | Originally released | |
| Series | Episodes | First released | Last released |
|---|---|---|---|
| 1 | 10 | 1 June 1999 | 3 August 1999 |
| 2 | 13 | 4 April 2000 | 4 July 2000 |
| 3 | 16 | 20 March 2001 | 3 July 2001 |
| 4 | 16 | 28 February 2002 | 13 June 2002 |
| 5 | 16 | 8 May 2003 | 21 August 2003 |
| 6 | 12 | 14 April 2004 | 23 August 2004 |
| 7 | 13 | 10 May 2005 | 19 December 2005 |
| 8 | 11 | 13 July 2006 | 20 December 2006 |

== Episodes ==
=== Series 1 (1999) ===
Series one was broadcast on Tuesdays at 9.00 pm.

| No. overall | No. in series | Title | Directed by | Written by | Original release date | UK viewers (millions) |
|---|---|---|---|---|---|---|
| 1 | 1 | "Them and Us" | Mike Adams | Maureen Chadwick | 1 June 1999 | 7.99 |
| 2 | 2 | "Drug Wars" | Mike Adams | Maureen Chadwick | 8 June 1999 | 7.39 |
| 3 | 3 | "Love Rival" | Laurence Moody | Phil Ford | 15 June 1999 | 6.36 |
| 4 | 4 | "The Victim" | Laurence Moody | Martin Allen | 22 June 1999 | 6.86 |
| 5 | 5 | "Tangled Web" | Laurence Moody | Louise Page | 29 June 1999 | 7.05 |
| 6 | 6 | "A Big Mistake" | Jim O'Hanlon | Tom Higgins | 6 July 1999 | 7.02 |
| 7 | 7 | "Playing with Fire" | Jim O'Hanlon | Ann McManus | 13 July 1999 | 7.67 |
| 8 | 8 | "Falling Apart" | Mike Adams | Sally Wainwright | 20 July 1999 | 7.60 |
| 9 | 9 | "Pay Back Time" | Mike Adams | Martin Allen | 27 July 1999 | 7.32 |
| 10 | 10 | "Love Hurts" | Mike Adams | Maureen Chadwick | 3 August 1999 | 7.66 |

=== Series 2 (2000) ===
Series two was broadcast on Tuesdays at 9.00 pm.

| No. overall | No. in series | Title | Directed by | Written by | Original release date | UK viewers (millions) |
|---|---|---|---|---|---|---|
| 11 | 1 | "Tug of Love" | Mike Adams | Maureen Chadwick | 4 April 2000 | 9.44 |
| 12 | 2 | "Shit Happens" | Mike Adams | Martin Allen | 11 April 2000 | 8.53 |
| 13 | 3 | "Visiting Time" | Laurence Moody | Mark Wadlow | 18 April 2000 | 8.21 |
| 14 | 4 | "Looking For Love" | Laurence Moody | Jayne Hoillinson | 25 April 2000 | 8.12 |
| 15 | 5 | "Mistaken Identity" | Laurence Moody | Maureen Chadwick | 2 May 2000 | 8.26 |
| 16 | 6 | "Losing It" | Jim O'Hanlon | Martin Allen | 9 May 2000 | 7.70 |
| 17 | 7 | "The Set-Up" | Jim O'Hanlon | Phil Ford | 16 May 2000 | 9.30 |
| 18 | 8 | "Babes Behind Bars" | Jim O'Hanlon | Maureen Chadwick | 23 May 2000 | 8.98 |
| 19 | 9 | "The Leaving" | Mike Adams | Jayne Hoillinson | 30 May 2000 | 9.49 |
| 20 | 10 | "Family Plan" | Mike Adams | Phil Ford | 6 June 2000 | 9.24 |
| 21 | 11 | "Rough Justice" | Mike Adams | Ann McManus | 13 June 2000 | 9.13 |
| 22 | 12 | "Facing Up" | Laurence Moody | Ann McManus | 27 June 2000 | 8.50 |
| 23 | 13 | "Oh What a Night!" | Laurence Moody | Ann McManus & Maureen Chadwick | 4 July 2000 | 8.81 |

=== Series 3 (2001) ===
Series three was broadcast on Tuesdays at 9.00 pm.

| No. overall | No. in series | Title | Directed by | Written by | Original release date | UK viewers (millions) |
|---|---|---|---|---|---|---|
| 24 | 1 | "Back From the Brink" | Mike Adams | Maureen Chadwick | 20 March 2001 | 9.42 |
| 25 | 2 | "The Turn of the Screw" | Mike Adams | Jayne Hollinson | 27 March 2001 | 8.49 |
| 26 | 3 | "The Chains of Freedom" | Laurence Moody | Phil Ford | 3 April 2001 | 8.59 |
| 27 | 4 | "False Identity" | Laurence Moody | Martin Allen | 10 April 2001 | 9.10 |
| 28 | 5 | "Blood Ties" | Laurence Moody | Liz Lake | 17 April 2001 | 8.60 |
| 29 | 6 | "Do or Die" | Jo Johnson | Maureen Chadwick | 24 April 2001 | 8.84 |
| 30 | 7 | "The Great Escape" | Jo Johnson | Jaden Clark | 1 May 2001 | 8.51 |
| 31 | 8 | "Uninvited Guests" | Mike Adams | Phil Ford | 8 May 2001 | 9.14 |
| 32 | 9 | "Common Criminal" | Mike Adams | Martin Allen | 15 May 2001 | 9.10 |
| 33 | 10 | "Chapel of Love" | Jim O'Hanlon | Jayne Hollinson | 22 May 2001 | 8.40 |
| 32 | 11 | "Battle Lines" | Jim O'Hanlon | Jaden Clark | 29 May 2001 | 8.60 |
| 35 | 12 | "Tough Love" | Jim O'Hanlon | Martin Allen | 5 June 2001 | 8.41 |
| 36 | 13 | "Revolving Doors" | Laurence Moody | Jayne Hollinson | 12 June 2001 | 8.46 |
| 37 | 14 | "Fronting Up" | Laurence Moody | Jaden Clark | 19 June 2001 | 8.18 |
| 38 | 15 | "Cat & Mouse" | Di Patrick | Phil Ford | 26 June 2001 | 8.12 |
| 39 | 16 | "Coming Out" | Di Patrick | Jaden Clark | 3 July 2001 | 8.15 |

=== Series 4 (2002) ===
Series four was broadcast on Thursdays at 9.00 pm.

| No. overall | No. in series | Title | Directed by | Written by | Original release date | UK viewers (millions) |
|---|---|---|---|---|---|---|
| 40 | 1 | "Fight or Flight" | Jo Johnson | Jaden Clark | 28 February 2002 | 7.56 |
| 41 | 2 | "Unholy Alliances" | Jo Johnson | Phil Ford | 7 March 2002 | 6.83 |
| 42 | 3 | "Behind Closed Doors" | Jo Johnson | Nick Malmholt & Miranda Wilson | 14 March 2002 | 7.30 |
| 43 | 4 | "Fait Accompli" | David Holroyd | Maureen Chadwick | 21 March 2002 | 7.33 |
| 44 | 5 | "Only the Lonely" | David Holroyd | Martin Allen | 28 March 2002 | 6.82 |
| 45 | 6 | "Sweet Sixteen" | Craig Lines | Jaden Clark | 4 April 2002 | 6.99 |
| 46 | 7 | "Pillow Talk" | Craig Lines | Phil Ford | 11 April 2002 | 6.92 |
| 47 | 8 | "Prison Issue" | Brett Fallis | Jayne Hollinson | 18 April 2002 | 7.10 |
| 48 | 9 | "Baby On Board" | Brett Fallis | Martin Allen | 25 April 2002 | 7.12 |
| 49 | 10 | "Family Matters" | Brett Fallis | Tim Hyndman | 2 May 2002 | 6.90 |
| 50 | 11 | "Battle Lines" | David Holroyd | Jamie Caruana | 9 May 2002 | 7.43 |
| 51 | 12 | "Appearances Sake" | David Holroyd | Jaden Clark | 16 May 2002 | 7.12 |
| 52 | 13 | "True Colours" | Di Patrick | Jamie Caruana | 23 May 2002 | 7.35 |
| 53 | 14 | "Hard Knock Life" | Di Patrick | Jaden Clark | 30 May 2002 | 6.59 |
| 54 | 15 | "Marriage of Inconvenience" | Jim O'Hanlon | Liz Lake | 6 June 2002 | 6.33 |
| 55 | 16 | "Curtain Call" | Jim O'Hanlon | Ann McManus & Maureen Chadwick | 13 June 2002 | 7.13 |

=== Series 5 (2003) ===
Series five was broadcast on Thursdays at 9.00 pm.

| No. overall | No. in series | Title | Directed by | Written by | Original release date | UK viewers (millions) |
|---|---|---|---|---|---|---|
| 56 | 1 | "Episode One" | Mike Adams | Ann McManus & Maureen Chadwick | 8 May 2003 | 8.36 |
| 57 | 2 | "Episode Two" | Mike Adams | Jaden Clark | 15 May 2003 | 7.88 |
| 58 | 3 | "Episode Three" | Jim Loach | Phil Ford | 22 May 2003 | 7.63 |
| 59 | 4 | "Episode Four" | Jim Loack | Guy Picot | 29 May 2003 | 6.92 |
| 60 | 5 | "Episode Five" | A.J. Quinn | Phil Ford | 5 June 2003 | 7.10 |
| 61 | 6 | "Episode Six" | A.J. Quinn | Phil Ford | 12 June 2003 | 6.62 |
| 62 | 7 | "Episode Seven" | A.J. Quinn | Jaden Clark | 19 June 2003 | 6.76 |
| 63 | 8 | "Episode Eight" | Julie Edwards | Ann McManus & Maureen Chadwick | 26 June 2003 | 6.36 |
| 64 | 9 | "Episode Nine" | Julie Edwards | Liz Lake | 3 July 2003 | 6.53 |
| 65 | 10 | "Episode Ten" | Laurence Moody | Jo O'Keefe | 10 July 2003 | 6.57 |
| 66 | 11 | "Episode Eleven" | Laurence Moody | Di Burrows | 17 July 2003 | 6.58 |
| 67 | 12 | "Episode Twelve" | Jim Loach | Liz Lake | 24 July 2003 | 6.53 |
| 68 | 13 | "Episode Thirteen" | Jim Loack | Liz Lake | 31 July 2003 | 6.56 |
| 69 | 14 | "Episode Fourteen" | Jim Loack | Di Burrows | 7 August 2003 | 6.43 |
| 70 | 15 | "Episode Fifteen" | Julie Edwards | Di Burrows | 14 August 2003 | 6.54 |
| 71 | 16 | "Episode Sixteen" | Julie Edwards | Liz Lake | 21 August 2003 | 6.78 |

=== Series 6 (2004) ===
Series six was broadcast at 9.00 pm on
Wednesdays (episodes 1–4), Mondays (episodes 5–6), Tuesday (episode 7), Wednesday (episode 8) and Mondays (episodes 9–12).

| No. overall | No. in series | Title | Directed by | Written by | Original release date | UK viewers (millions) |
|---|---|---|---|---|---|---|
| 72 | 1 | "Episode One" | Nigel Douglas | Di Burrows & Paul Mousley | 14 April 2004 | 7.94 |
| 73 | 2 | "Episode Two" | Nigel Douglas | Paul Mousley | 21 April 2004 | 8.25 |
| 74 | 3 | "Episode Three" | Ian Knox | Di Burrows & Jane Marlow | 28 April 2004 | 7.51 |
| 75 | 4 | "Episode Four" | Ian Knox | Di Burrows | 5 May 2004 | 7.78 |
| 76 | 5 | "Episode Five" | Julian Holmes | Paul Mousley | 10 May 2004 | 7.75 |
| 77 | 6 | "Episode Six" | Julian Holmes | Paul Mousley | 17 May 2004 | 7.87 |
| 78 | 7 | "Episode Seven" | Ian White | Helen Eatock | 18 May 2004 | 7.22 |
| 79 | 8 | "Episode Eight" | Ian White | Phil Ford | 19 May 2004 | 7.80 |
| 80 | 9 | "Episode Nine" | Nigel Douglas | Di Burrows | 2 August 2004 | 6.27 |
| 81 | 10 | "Episode Ten" | Nigel Douglas | Paul Mousley | 9 August 2004 | 5.92 |
| 82 | 11 | "Episode Eleven" | Jim Loach | Liz Lake | 16 August 2004 | 5.57 |
| 83 | 12 | "Episode Twelve" | Jim Loach | Phil Ford | 23 August 2004 | 6.67 |

=== Series 7 (2005) ===
Series seven was broadcast at 9.00 pm on Tuesdays (episodes 1–12) and Monday (episode 13).

| No. overall | No. in series | Title | Directed by | Written by | Original release date | UK viewers (millions) |
|---|---|---|---|---|---|---|
| 84 | 1 | "Episode One" | Julian Holmes | Phil Ford | 10 May 2005 | 6.21 |
| 85 | 2 | "Episode Two" | Julian Holmes | Liz Lake | 17 May 2005 | 6.05 |
| 86 | 3 | "Episode Three" | Lance Kneeshaw | Polly Eden | 24 May 2005 | 5.64 |
| 87 | 4 | "Episode Four" | Lance Kneeshaw | Phil Ford | 31 May 2005 | 5.05 |
| 88 | 5 | "Episode Five" | Laurence Moody | Liz Lake | 7 June 2005 | 4.84 |
| 89 | 6 | "Episode Six" | Laurence Moody | Liz Lake | 14 June 2005 | 5.56 |
| 90 | 7 | "Episode Seven" | S.J. Clarkson | Paul Mousley | 21 June 2005 | 5.18 |
| 91 | 8 | "Episode Eight" | S.J. Clarkson | Jane Marlow | 28 June 2005 | 4.80 |
| 92 | 9 | "Episode Nine" | Lance Kneeshaw | Paul Mousley | 5 July 2005 | 5.51 |
| 93 | 10 | "Episode Ten" | Laurence Moody | Polly Eden | 12 July 2005 | 5.78 |
| 94 | 11 | "Episode Eleven" | Declan O'Dwyer | Phil Ford | 19 July 2005 | 5.58 |
| 95 | 12 | "Episode Twelve" | Jim Loach | Paul Mousley | 26 July 2005 | 5.49 |
| 96 | 13 | "Episode Thirteen" | Martin Hutchings | Paul Mousley | 19 December 2005 | 7.16 |

=== Series 8 (2006) ===
Series eight was broadcast at 9.00 pm on Thursdays (episodes 1–10) and Wednesday (episode 11).

| No. overall | No. in series | Title | Directed by | Written by | Original release date | UK viewers (millions) |
|---|---|---|---|---|---|---|
| 97 | 1 | "Episode One" | Barnaby Southcombe | Liz Lake | 13 July 2006 | 5.40 |
| 98 | 2 | "Episode Two" | Barnaby Southcombe | Ann McManus & Maureen Chadwick | 20 July 2006 | 4.47 |
| 99 | 3 | "Episode Three" | Lance Kneeshaw | Jodi Reynolds | 27 July 2006 | 4.41 |
| 100 | 4 | "Episode Four" | Lance Kneeshaw | Phil Ford | 3 August 2006 | 4.18 |
| 101 | 5 | "Episode Five" | Laurence Moody | Roxanne Harvey | 10 August 2006 | 4.28 |
| 102 | 6 | "Episode Six" | Laurence Moody | Paul Mousley | 17 August 2006 | 4.87 |
| 103 | 7 | "Episode Seven" | Jim Loach | Liz Lake | 24 August 2006 | 5.00 |
| 104 | 8 | "Episode Eight" | Jim Loach | Phil Ford | 31 August 2006 | 4.56 |
| 105 | 9 | "Episode Nine" | Jim Loach | Roxanne Harvey | 7 September 2006 | 4.62 |
| 106 | 10 | "Episode Ten" | Lance Kneeshaw | Harriet Warner | 14 September 2006 | 4.98 |
| 107 | 11 | "Episode Eleven" | Laurence Moody | Phil Ford | 20 December 2006 | 5.13 |

== Ratings ==
Bad Girls : UK viewers per episode (millions)

| Season | Episode number | | | | | | | | | | | | | | | | Average |
| Season | 1 | 2 | 3 | 4 | 5 | 6 | 7 | 8 | 9 | 10 | 11 | 12 | 13 | 14 | 15 | 16 | Average |
|---|---|---|---|---|---|---|---|---|---|---|---|---|---|---|---|---|---|
| 1 | 7.99 | 7.39 | 6.36 | 6.86 | 7.05 | 7.02 | 7.67 | 7.60 | 7.32 | 7.66 | – | | | | | | 7.29 |
| 2 | 9.44 | 8.53 | 8.21 | 8.12 | 8.26 | 7.70 | 9.30 | 8.98 | 9.49 | 9.24 | 9.13 | 8.50 | 8.81 | – | | | 8.75 |
| 3 | 9.42 | 8.49 | 8.59 | 9.10 | 8.60 | 8.84 | 8.51 | 9.14 | 9.10 | 8.40 | 8.60 | 8.41 | 8.46 | 8.18 | 8.12 | 8.15 | 8.63 |
| 4 | 7.56 | 6.83 | 7.30 | 7.33 | 6.82 | 6.99 | 6.92 | 7.10 | 7.12 | 6.90 | 7.43 | 7.12 | 7.35 | 6.59 | 6.33 | 7.13 | 7.05 |
| 5 | 8.36 | 7.88 | 7.63 | 6.92 | 7.10 | 6.62 | 6.76 | 6.36 | 6.53 | 6.57 | 6.58 | 6.53 | 6.56 | 6.43 | 6.54 | 6.78 | 6.88 |
| 6 | 7.94 | 8.25 | 7.51 | 7.78 | 7.75 | 7.87 | 7.22 | 7.80 | 6.27 | 5.92 | 5.57 | 6.67 | – | | | | 7.21 |
| 7 | 6.21 | 6.05 | 5.64 | 5.05 | 4.84 | 5.56 | 5.18 | 4.80 | 5.51 | 5.78 | 5.58 | 5.49 | 7.16 | – | | | 5.60 |
| 8 | 5.40 | 4.47 | 4.41 | 4.18 | 4.28 | 4.87 | 5.00 | 4.56 | 4.62 | 4.98 | 5.13 | – | | | | | 4.72 |

Audience measurement performed by Broadcasters' Audience Research Board
