= Okonma =

Okonma is an Igbo surname meaning "good man". Notable people with the surname include:

- Antonia Okonma (born 1982), British actress
- Tyler Okonma (born 1991), American rapper known as Tyler, the Creator
