= Martin Allen (writer) =

English playwright and screenwriter

Martin Allen (born in Wakefield, Yorkshire) is an English playwright and screenwriter.

His first play, the one-act Taking The Floor (1982), formed part of an entertainment at the Bloomsbury Theatre for the launch of a new album by The Passions. In 1983, his play Red Saturday, for Paines Plough, directed by Tim Fywell, toured the UK and was staged at the New End Theatre in Hampstead. It won the 1983 Samuel Beckett Award, and in 1984 transferred to the Royal Court Theatre Upstairs, then under the auspices of Danny Boyle. It was published by Faber. In 1985, as part of the Thames TV Playwrights scheme, he was writer in residence at Hampstead Theatre where his play Particular Friendships, directed by Michael Attenborough, won Thames TV’s best play award for that year. It was also published by Faber.

In 1986, his original screenplay Song of Experience was directed by Stephen Frears for the BBC Screen Two series. He then wrote the screenplay for Paul Greengrass’ debut feature Resurrected (St Pancras Films & Channel 4) which was entered in competition at the 1989 Berlin Film Festival where it won both OCIC and Interfilm awards for best film. It was given a UK theatrical release later that year.

In 1991, he joined the writing team at Coronation Street and has written over 300 episodes. As part of the team, he was winner of the Writers’ Guild award for best drama serial in 1993, 2009 and 2013.

In 1998, his original screenplay Touch And Go, a BBC Screen Two film, directed by Tim Fywell, achieved the highest viewing figures for a BBC Two drama that year.

Between 1999 and 2002, he wrote nine episodes for the first four series of Bad Girls.

Projects of note which remain unproduced include The Unyellow Years (1987) for St Pancras Films, tracing Vincent van Gogh’s early career in the Netherlands; The Glasnost Special (1990), a comedy for Skreba Films; White Lies (1990), a four-part thriller for Sleeping Partners (Paul Greengrass & Andy Harries) and Channel 4, set in Antarctica; Going Critical (1993), for the Royal Shakespeare Company, then under the tenure of Adrian Noble; Hell To Pay (1995) a rehearsed reading at the Vaudeville Theatre in association with Michael Codron; Spring And Port Wine (2001), a pilot for a ten-part series based on the Bill Naughton play for Carlton TV (Charles Elton and Jonathan Powell); and The Master Cut (2005), a play about the music business.
