= Lindsey Fawcett =

British actress

- Born: 10 January 1979 (age 47); Liverpool, Merseyside, England
- Occupation: Actress
- Years active: 1997–2005, 2021

Lindsey Fawcett (born 10 January 1979) is a retired British actress. She is perhaps best known for her role as the inmate Sharon 'Shaz' Wylie on the hit drama television series Bad Girls.

== Biography ==
Lindsey's first professional job was playing Bet in Sam Mendes’ production of Oliver! at the London Palladium. She went on to perform in numerous theatre productions including The Prime of Miss Jean Brodie, directed by Phyllida Lloyd for The National Theatre and A Small Family Business at Chichester. She toured with the RSC in Coriolanus and The Merry Wives of Windsor and has performed in several radio plays including Agatha Christie's Evil Under The Sun for BBC Radio 4.

== Personal life ==
Fawcett lives with her partner and children in Sheffield.

Lindsey went to Ackworth School where she had a music scholarship and the University of Sheffield from 2005 to 2008 studying French and journalism. She achieved a first class honours degree.

Lindsey has run several marathons and has raised money for the charity St Luke's Hospice.

Her younger sister, Keeley, starred as Charlotte Braithwaite on At Home with the Braithwaites.

== Filmography ==
Year	Title	Role	Notes	Ref.
1997	Heartbeat	Tracey Knight	Series 7, Episode 15: "In on the Act"	
2000–2002	Bad Girls	Sharon 'Shaz' Wylie	Series 2–4 (main role, 33 episodes)	
2000	If...	Charlie	Series 1, Episode 4: "If... It Was a Woman's World"	
2005	Doctors	Sophie James	Series 6, Episode 144: "Into the Light"	
2021	The Party	Marie	Short film (voice)	
