= Jennifer Ness =

British actress

Jennifer Ness (born in Cheshire, England in 1972) is an English actress best known for her role as Kris Yates in the ITV drama Bad Girls. She studied at the Mount View Theatre school.

== Career ==
Ness had her first professional role in the TV film The Magician, with Clive Owen, in 1993. She has had roles in Holby City, Casualty, Peak Practice, Hollyoaks, A&E, London's Burning and Reps. She has also performed in a number of theatre productions including End Of Story and Rebecca.

For the role of Kris Yates, Ness had to have her hair cut short from being very long. She said in her Bad Girls interview that she enjoyed the stunt scenes. She also enjoyed the scene when she found Yvonne's body in the hanging cell. The worst scene was when Jim Fenner (Jack Ellis) went mad and urinated on her.

== Personal life ==
Ness was born in Cheshire, England. She lives in Norfolk with her husband and 3 children. She has produced many short films, talking books and is a regular on QVC.

== Filmography ==
Year	Title	Role	Notes
1993	The Magician	Claire	TV movie
1995	The Bill	Julie Slater	Series 11, “A Fighting Chance” (guest)
1995	London's Burning	Tara	Series 8, Episode 3 (guest)
1997	The Bill	Traffic Warden	Series 13, “You and Me Versus the World” (guest)
1999	Peak Practice	Gail Wise	Series 7, “Fighting Chance” (guest)
2002	Always and Everyone	Fiona	Series 4 (3 episodes; recurring)
2003	Holby City	Martine Garber	Series 4, “Judas Kiss: Part 1” (guest)
2003	Reps	Melanie Wilson	
2003–04	Bad Girls	Kris Yates	Series 5–6 (15 episodes; regular)
2006	Casualty	Lisa Hendry	Series 20, “The Lost Boys” (guest)
2006	The Bill	Rachel Tate	Series 22, “To Those Who Wait: Part 2” (guest)
