= Bad Girls (TV series) =

British television drama series

- Also known as: Jail Birds (UK working title)
- Created by: Maureen Chadwick; Ann McManus
- Starring: Victoria Alcock; Isabelle Amyes; Amanda Barrie; Stephanie Beacham; Dannielle Brent; Liz May Brice; Victoria Bush; Pauline Campbell; Lara Cazalet; Sharon Duncan-Brewster; Jack Ellis; Alicya Eyo; Nicole Faraday; Lindsey Fawcett; Helen Fraser; James Gaddas; Ellie Haddington; Linda Henry; Mandana Jones; Claire King; Simone Lahbib; Charlotte Lucas; Philip McGough; Kika Mirylees; Jennifer Ness; Kerry Norton; Antonia Okonma; Kim Oliver; Eva Pope; Nicola Stapleton; Debra Stephenson; Tristan Sturrock; Tracey Wilkinson
- Composers: Nina Humphreys (Series 1); Kath Gotts (Series 2–8); Michael Walton (Series 2–8)
- Country of origin: United Kingdom
- Original language: English
- No. of series: 8
- No. of episodes: 107 (list of episodes)

Production
- Executive producer: Brian Park
- Producers: Brian Park; Claire Phillips; David Crean; Cameron Roach; Rachel Snell; Sharon Houlihan
- Running time: 45–70 minutes
- Production company: Shed Productions

Original release
- Network: ITV
- Release: 1 June 1999 – 20 December 2006

Related
- Footballers' Wives (2002–2006); Bad Girls: The Musical (2006–2007)

Bad Girls is a British television drama series that was broadcast on ITV from 1 June 1999 until 20 December 2006. It was created by Maureen Chadwick and Ann McManus of Shed Productions, who initiated the idea of developing a series primarily focusing on the inmates and staff of the fictional women's prison, Larkhall, located in the South London region. Following the success of previous series Within These Walls and the Australian-imported Prisoner: Cell Block H, both of which screened on ITV, Bad Girls was commissioned by the network and was viewed as a realistic, modern portrayal of life in a women's prison. The series featured a large ensemble cast, including Linda Henry, Claire King, Simone Lahbib, Mandana Jones, Debra Stephenson, Jack Ellis, Alicya Eyo, Helen Fraser, Kika Mirylees, Victoria Alcock, James Gaddas, Victoria Bush, Dannielle Brent and Liz May Brice.

Unlike past prison series, Bad Girls storylines were portrayed in a more graphic manner in terms of violence, language, and sexual content, as prior shows were somewhat more restrictive in content. Common themes in the series include separation from families, recidivism and adjustment to prison life, while storylines concern the friendships and relationships between the inmates and staff alike, and to a more serious extent, the series focused on sensitive issues such as bullying, rape, suicide, miscarriage, drug use and violence against women, and as a result, was screened past the watershed. It is also notable in that lesbian, gay, bisexual and transgender characters are portrayed in a more permissive way.

The show achieved critical acclaim, becoming immensely successful, particularly throughout the course of its first three years. It constantly attracted high viewing figures, peaking at 9.49 million viewers during the ninth episode of the second series, the highest rated episode of any series produced by Shed Productions. The series began to decline very slightly during its fourth and fifth series' due to an overturn of popular characters, yet the show remained successful in the ratings. However, its popularity began to rise once again with the show's sixth series. This was followed by a rapid decline for the seventh and eighth series', which ultimately led to the show's demise. Due to its success, the series received numerous awards, most notably at the National Television Awards, a crossover with Footballers' Wives, and a musical adapted from the original series, titled Bad Girls: The Musical. Bad Girls gained international success in countries including the United States, Australia, Ireland and several European countries.

== Production ==
=== Development ===
Extensive research was covered prior to the production stage of the series on the lives of British female prisoners. Ann McManus and Maureen Chadwick, as well as several cast members, spent months visiting prisons during 1998 and 1999 in order to gather information and research on incarcerated women to inspire their roles for the series and how prisons had currently been run. McManus and Chadwick studied everything in detail on television series' set within women's prisons, including ITV's 1970s series Within These Walls, Network Ten's Australian soap opera Prisoner: Cell Block H, which was first broadcast on ITV in 1984 until the late 1990s, and several prison documentaries, in addition to three books which McManus had written and all of which were presented to the cast. In order to continue their research, in January 1999, McManus and Chadwick attended an AGM of Women in Prison, a support group for female prisoners, to address such issues within female prisons, consulting former prisoners such as Chris Tchaikovsky, and organisations such as NACRO and the Prison Officer's Association.

=== Filming ===
The series was commissioned by ITV under the working title Jail Birds and commenced filming in February 1999. However the show's name was later changed after a BBC One documentary series about women in prison used the same title a few months before the first series was aired.

The exact location of the fictional HMP Larkhall was never revealed, although in series 1, episode 4, character Shell Dockley mentioned it was 'not far' from Clapham. There were several other references through the series that alluded to it being in the South London region, but no specific location was given. Several districts of the London area were referenced throughout the series run, these include: Peckham, Clapham, Acton, Catford, Streatham, Sydenham, Tooting, Stratford, Balham, and Bethnal Green. HM Prison Oxford, located within Oxford Castle, was used for the exterior shots featured in Series 1 to 3. The interior scenes featured a replica set of the prison's wing and constructed within 3 Mills Studios. A reconstruction of the prison's exterior was also created for series 4 onwards, as HM Prison Oxford had by then been redeveloped into a hotel complex. After ITV decommissioned the series in October 2006, 3 Mills kept hold of a prison exterior and a single cell. Before it was largely dismantled, the exterior and interior sets were used in series 3, episode 11 of Waterloo Road and series 23, episode 89 of The Bill. The music video for Rachel Stevens' 2005 UK single "I Said Never Again (But Here We Are)" was also filmed on the set.

Many scenes outside of Larkhall were filmed on location, usually around London, with numerous London landmarks being visible in shots. Real houses were used for prison officers houses, rather than sets. Four episodes included scenes filmed outside of the UK, two episodes in series 3 had scenes that were filmed in Spain, the first episode of series 5 opened with a scene in Amsterdam, series 7 featured scenes filmed in Peru, but set in Costa del Sol.

=== Music ===
For the first series of Bad Girls in 1999, the complete music score and theme was composed by award-winning composer Nina Humphreys. The theme music did not play over the end credits of episode 4, and was replaced with the song Amazing Grace, performed by Sharon Duncan-Brewster (Crystal Gordon). In 2000, Kath Gotts became the credited composer for the remaining duration of the series, resulting in a major revamp of the incidental music score, the recap music and newly established theme music, introduced for the second series. As with the first series, the theme music played over the end credits in Series 2 as the 5-second opening title contained only short instrumental music. For the third series a new 20-second opening sequence was introduced which contained various shots of G-wing, and a second version of the theme music was created by Gotts so that the series could be recognized as having official opening titles. Towards the end of the third series, a third and final version of the theme music was placed over the opening sequence, which slightly differed from the previous music, and remained as such for the show's duration. In 2002, a soundtrack CD was released as part of the original Series 3 DVD, featuring the music score from the third series and including both opening and closing theme music, recap music, and "next time" music, as well as the incidental music. The soundtrack is currently unavailable as the DVD set is now out-of-print. Furthermore, Gotts composed the entire music and wrote the lyrics for the adapted musical, Bad Girls: The Musical.

=== Format ===
Bad Girls was an early example of a British television series to be produced in widescreen format 1.78:1. Although most of Britain were still viewing standard screen televisions, the early years of the series were seen in a format of 14:9 on analog television and cropped to pan and scan for the DVD releases of the first three series. These early episodes have been re-screened on ITV3 and CBS Drama in their original format and were later re-issued in widescreen on DVD.

== Cast and characters ==
=== Main ===
- Simone Lahbib as Helen Stewart (Series 1–3)
- Mandana Jones as Nikki Wade (Series 1–3)
- Debra Stephenson as Michelle "Shell" Dockley (Series 1–3, special guest Series 5)
- Jack Ellis as Jim Fenner (Series 1–7)
- Alicya Eyo as Daniella "Denny" Blood (Series 1–5)
- Joanne Froggatt as Rachel Hicks (Series 1)
- Luisa Bradshaw-White as Lorna Rose (Series 1)
- Joe Shaw as Dominic McAllister (Series 1–2)
- Helen Fraser as Sylvia Hollamby (Series 1–8)
- Kika Mirylees as Julie Johnston (Series 1–8)
- Victoria Alcock as Julie Saunders (Series 1–8)
- Lara Cazalet as Zandra Plackett (Series 1–2)
- Jane Lowe as Monica Lindsay (Series 1, guest Series 3)
- Sharon Duncan-Brewster as Crystal Gordon (Series 1–4)
- Linda Henry as Yvonne Atkins (recurring Series 1, main Series 2–5)
- Claire King as Karen Betts (Series 2–5, special guest Series 6)
- Nathan Constance as Josh Mitchell (Series 2–3, recurring Series 4)
- Tracey Wilkinson as Diane "Di" Barker (Series 2–7)
- Philip McGough as Dr Malcolm Nicholson (recurring Series 2–3, 5, main Series 6–7)
- Isabelle Amyes as Barbara Hunt (Series 2–5)
- Lindsey Fawcett as Sharon "Shaz" Wiley (Series 2–4)
- Lisa Turner as Gina Rossi (Series 3)
- Paul Opacic as Mark Waddle (Series 3–4)
- Kim Oliver as Buki Lester (Series 3–5)
- Kerry Norton as Maxine "Maxi" Purvis (Series 3–4)
- Victoria Bush as Tina Purvis / Julie O'Kane / Tina O'Kane (Series 3–8)
- Pauline Campbell as Alison "Al" McKenzie (Series 3–6)
- James Gaddas as Neil Grayling (Series 4–7, guest Series 8)
- Kellie Bright as Cassie Tyler (Series 4)
- Siobhan McCarthy as Roisin Connor (Series 4)
- Nicole Faraday as "Snowball" Merriman (Series 4–5)
- Tristan Sturrock as Colin Hedges (Series 5–7)
- Stephanie Beacham as Phyllida "Phyl" Oswyn (Series 5–8)
- Amanda Barrie as Beverly "Bev" Tull (Series 5–8)
- Charlotte Lucas as Selena Geeson (Series 5–6)
- Jennifer Ness as Kristen "Kris" Yates (Series 5–6)
- Eva Pope as Frances Myers (Series 6)
- Dannielle Brent as Natalie Buxton (Series 6–8)
- Antonia Okonma as Darlene Cake (Series 6–8)
- Nicola Stapleton as Janine Nebeski (Series 7–8)
- Rebecca Hazlewood as Arun Parmar (Series 7)
- Liz May Brice as Patricia "Pat" Kerrigan (Series 7–8)
- Laura Rogers as Sheena Williams (Series 7)
- Andrew Scarborough as Kevin Spiers (Series 7)
- Ellie Haddington as Joy Masterton (Series 7–8)
- Amanda Donohoe as Louise "Lou" Stoke (Series 8)
- Sid Owen as Donny Kimber (Series 8)
- Colin Salmon as Rowan Dunlop (Series 8)
- Angela Bruce as Mandy Goodhue (Series 8)

=== Guest ===
- Roland Oliver as Simon Stubberfield (Series 1–3)
- Oliver Fox as Sean Parr (Series 1)
- Ashlee Miller as Carol Byatt (Series 1)
- Eugene Walker as Ken Blakeson (Series 1–5)
- Timmy Lang as Spencer Lindsay (Series 1)
- Victoria Pritchard as Trisha (Series 1 & 3)
- Gideon Turner as Robin Dunston (Series 1–2)
- David Case as Chaplin (Series 1–3)
- Denise Black as Jessie Devlin (Series 1–2)
- Kim Taylforth as Marilyn Fenner (Series 2–3)
- Danielle King as Lauren Atkins (Series 2–3)
- Jade Williams as Rhiannon Dawson (Series 2 & 4)
- Helen Schlesinger as Tessa Spall (Series 2–3)
- Sian Webber as Megan "Meg" Richards (Series 2)
- Ivan Kaye as Charlie Atkins (Series 2–3)
- Julie Legrand as Rita Dockley (Series 2)
- Alison Newman as Renee Williams (Series 2)
- Danielle Lydon as Claire Walker (Series 1–2)
- Geoffrey Hutchings as Bobby Hollamby (Series 2–3 & 5)
- Steven Webb as David Saunders (Series 3 & 8)
- Martin Crewes as Guy Cullen (Series 3)
- Wendi Peters as Pamela "Pam" Jolly (Series 3)
- Michael Higgs as Thomas Waugh (Series 3)
- Kate Steavenson-Payne as Charlotte Myddleton (Series 3)
- Helen Grace as Caroline Lewis (Series 3)
- Andrew Lancel as Barry Pearce (Series 4)
- Adam Leese as Damien Morrison (Series 4)
- Michael Elwyn as Henry Mills (Series 4–5)
- Maria Charles as Noreen Biggs (Series 4–5)
- Sarah Hadland as "Spike" (Series 4)
- Alex King as Ritchie Atkins (Series 4–5)
- Paul Brennan as Eric Bostock (Series 5)
- Nikki Amuka-Bird as Paula Miles (Series 5–6)
- Jamie Thomas King as Tony (Series 5)
- Holly Palmer as Milly Yates (Series 5–6)
- Geff Francis as Rick Revoir (Series 6)
- Richard Mylan as Ben Phillips / Ben Hennessey (Series 6–7)
- Stephen Rahman-Hughes as Stuart Jones (Series 6)
- Orlessa Altass as Vicky Floyd (Series 7)
- Francesca Fowler as Laura Canning (Series 7)
- Paul Henry as Frank (Series 7)
- Mika Simmons as DI Kitson (Series 7)
- Colette O'Neil as Sister Thomas (Series 7)
- Louis Waymouth as Bobby Darren Hollamby (Series 7–8)
- Gaynor Howe as Christy Mackay (Series 7)
- Nicola Redmond as Miranda Miles (Series 7)
- Laura Dos Santos as Elmira Al Jahani (Series 8)
- Sandra De Douse as Ashlee Wilcox (Series 8)
- Helen Modern as Stella Gough (Series 8)
- Gugu Mbatha-Raw as "Fidelity" Saunders (Series 8)
- Melanie Cameron as Vicky Stoke (Series 8)

=== Special guest ===
- Kate O'Mara as Virginia O'Kane (Series 3)
- Christopher Biggins as Himself (Series 5)
- Zöe Lucker as Tanya Turner (Series 6)
- Meera Syal as Janan Hamad (Series 6)
- Annette Badland as Angela Robbins (Series 8)
- Jan Francis as Catherine Earlham (Series 8)

== Episodes ==
Series	Episodes	Originally released	
Series	Episodes	First released	Last released
1	10	1 June 1999	3 August 1999
2	13	4 April 2000	4 July 2000
3	16	20 March 2001	3 July 2001
4	16	28 February 2002	13 June 2002
5	16	8 May 2003	21 August 2003
6	12	14 April 2004	23 August 2004
7	13	10 May 2005	19 December 2005
8	11	13 July 2006	20 December 2006

=== Series 1 (1999) ===
From the beginning, Bad Girls dealt with controversial subject matter. Early episodes of the first series included particularly shocking moments such as a pregnant prisoner miscarrying in her cell, Zandra Plackett (Lara Cazalet) being viciously strip-searched by fellow inmates for concealed drugs, and Rachel Hicks (Joanne Froggatt) committing suicide due to being bullied. The central story arc of the first three series revolved around the developing romantic relationship between Nikki Wade (Mandana Jones), a prisoner serving a life sentence for the murder of a policeman who attempted to rape her girlfriend, and Helen Stewart (Simone Lahbib), the Wing Governor who spent much of series one engaged to her boyfriend, Sean. Furthermore, the script, unwilling to compromise the realism of the programme, contained much strong language (for example, the reference to Nikki Wade as a "rug-muncher" and Denny Blood's (Alicya Eyo) gloating over the likelihood of Rachel Hicks having "singed her minge"). Other storylines to feature prominently in series one included the pregnancy of a young drug addict Zandra, who decides to use an abortion as means to be sent to an outside clinic only for her to escape and make contact with her ex-boyfriend who has no interest in her or the baby, therefore she has no choice but to return to the clinic. In fear of losing her job over Zandra's escape, Officer Lorna Rose (Luisa Bradshaw-White) asks fellow Officer Dominic McAllister (Joe Shaw) to keep quiet about the escape which leads to Zandra blackmailing Lorna to bring drugs into the prison, when Shell discovers what Zandra is up to she decides to set Lorna up; the appeal of wrongly-imprisoned Monica Lindsay (Jane Lowe) (frequently referred to as "posh bitch" by other characters) and the illicit relationship between Jim Fenner (Jack Ellis), the male Principal Officer and Shell Dockley (Debra Stephenson), the resident bully, Original Top Dog and drug dealer, serving life for murder.

=== Series 2 (2000) ===
Nikki and Helen's relationship deepens with Helen resigning from the Wing Governor's post and working as a new liaison officer for prisoners sentenced to life imprisonment, encouraging Nikki to continue her education and appeal against her sentence. Shell's background was examined in some detail, with harrowing scenes describing childhood abuse. Zandra's tragic story finally comes to a close when she dies from a brain tumour. For light relief, Yvonne Atkins (Linda Henry), the gangster's moll, set up "Babes Behind Bars", a sex-hotline staffed by the prisoners with smuggled in mobile phones, playing such characters as "Whiplash Wanda", "Saucy Sonia" and "Vicky the Virgin Bride". Series two ended on a double cliffhanger, with Nikki escaping from Larkhall to be with Helen, leaving Helen to agonise over whether to contact the police, and Shell luring Fenner to her cell for sex, where she reaches under her bed for a broken bottle.

=== Series 3 (2001) ===
Series 3 picks up where Series 2 left off. Fenner and Shell are in bed together and Nikki, dressed in a nurse's uniform, is at Helen's house after escaping. Shell stabs Fenner with a broken bottle that she had brought back from Sylvia Hollamby's (Helen Fraser) party, with Fenner bleeding to death, Shell is in demand and soon finds herself back on top as Top Dog. New officer, the flirtatious and vivacious Gina Rossi arrives on G-Wing and soon locks horns with several inmates and staff alike. Young crack addicted prostitute, Buki Lester (Kim Oliver), arrives and lands Denny in danger when a piercing goes wrong. Nikki also suffers from heartbreak when her on and off relationship with Helen comes to an end, while she is staring her appeal in the face.

The third series saw a high turnover of short-term characters and storylines, but also chronicled the spectacular escape of Shell and Denny to the Costa Del Sol in Spain getting revenge on Sylvia and her husband along the way; Yvonne's Top Dog status being challenged by Maxi Purvis (Kerry Norton), the head of the "Peckham Boot Gang"; prison officer Di Barker's (Tracey Wilkinson) struggles as a home carer for her disabled mother and an upbeat finale of Helen and Nikki finally committing to their relationship when Nikki's appeal is successful and she is released from prison.

=== Series 4 (2002) ===
Following on from one of the several cliffhangers from series three, Yvonne in the frame for Virginia O'Kane's (Kate O'Mara) murder there is a game of cat and mouse between her and Fenner while the real culprits continue their reign over G-Wing. But it's not long before Yvonne is ruling the roost again, when Denny returns in the nick of time and aids Yvonne in her bid to prove her innocence. She arrives with Roisin Connor and Cassie Tyler, imprisoned for fraud and in a lesbian relationship complicated not only by their being behind bars, but by Roisin's being a married mother-of-two. The stress of G-Wing mounts for Karen Betts (Claire King), especially when she and Fenner split, but the stress is no longer her problem when she is demoted to basic officer and he is promoted to Wing Governor by Neil Grayling (James Gaddas), the new Governing Governor of Larkhall, who developed an attraction to Fenner. The series tackled domestic violence within the relationship of Di and Barry Pearce and teenage junkie Buki's battle for the right to see her disabled son, Lennox. The bitter hatred between Maxi and Shaz Wiley (Lindsey Fawcett) grows and ends in tragedy following a brutal fight. Crystal Gordon (Sharon Duncan Brewster) gives birth in the four-bed dorm to a daughter but soon loses her faith in religion when another baby in the prison dies. Rhiannon Dawson, Julie Johnston's (Kika Mirylees) daughter arrives on the wing and the Julies are soon facing an additional sentence when the truth about Rhiannon's relationship with her boyfriend, Damion, is revealed. Yvonne and Karen find themselves at war when Yvonne's son, Ritchie, is revealed to be having a relationship with Karen. This is later revealed as a decoy, as his real girlfriend is new devious inmate, Snowball Merriman (Nicole Faraday), whom Ritchie is helping to escape from Larkhall. The fourth series ended with the prison library being obliterated as part of an escape plan by Snowball, resulting in a fire that left several inmates trapped and fighting for their lives.

=== Series 5 (2003) ===
The fifth series of Bad Girls saw the brief return of a recaptured and pregnant Shell to G-Wing. Fenner pimps Shell by offering her money to give the male officers a handjob. After the baby's birth, new screw, Colin Hedges tries to force her to have sex, when she violently refuses, Fenner makes it seem as if she tried to smother her baby. Shell is removed to a mental home, and her baby is taken into care.

The "Costa Cons", Bev Tull (Amanda Barrie) and Phyl Oswyn (Stephanie Beacham) arrive. There is good news for Denny, who is transferred to an open prison. The ongoing feud between Fenner and Wing Governor Karen reaches its climax as Fenner ruthlessly frames Karen for a hit-and-run accident in which a man dies. Julie Saunders is diagnosed with breast cancer and takes the decision to take her chances without chemotherapy treatment. Barbara Hunt (Isabelle Amyes) marries the former prison chaplain, Henry Mills – bad news for Sylvia, who had set her sights on Henry after she was widowed when her husband, Bobby committed suicide.

New prison officer Selena Geeson (Charlotte Lucas) and new inmate Kris Yates (Jennifer Ness) are in a relationship. Kris is taking the rap for killing her abusive father in order to spare her younger sister, Milly, the real culprit. Fenner's nefarious ways continue when he kills Yvonne as she tries to escape Larkhall, by ensuring that she will be trapped in the "hanging cell", a small room beneath the main prison that is blocked off from the outside world.

=== Series 6 (2004) ===
With G-Wing thinking their ex-top dog has escaped HMP Larkhall, Kris finds Yvonne's corpse after she tries to follow the same way out; as it is all blocked off, she tells Selena who she found. Selena then tells Neil she found Yvonne. Yvonne's death shocks G-Wing. In her absence, Phyl is G-Wing top dog for a short time before being stopped in her tracks by new Wing Governor Frances Myers (Eva Pope).

Frances soon begins a feud with new inmate Natalie Buxton (Dannielle Brent), in prison for organising a prostitution ring using underage girls. The other girls are disgusted with Natalie and Al McKenzie (Pauline Campbell) plans to beat her up, but Natalie turns the tables and beats Al up. Natalie soon makes the other girls believe she is innocent.

The series features a crossover with Shed Productions' other hit series, Footballers' Wives, with the glamorous character of Tanya Turner (Zöe Lucker) enduring a spell on G-Wing for three special episodes that aired over consecutive nights in May 2004. Later Tanya is soon released, after striking a deal with Frances. During her time on G-Wing, Tanya was accused of poisoning her fellow inmates with rhubarb, with Al dying from her illness, however, it was soon uncovered that Bev and Phyl were actually responsible.

Kris' sister, Milly, commits suicide after Selena puts her under pressure to confess to her father's killing (in self-defence) in order to free her sister. Kris and Selena split and Kris sleeps with Natalie but the couple are reconciled and the series ends with the cliffhanger of Kris and Selena protesting in London about the injustice of Kris being behind bars.

Fenner marries Neil's ex-wife Di. As Neil and Karen are sure Fenner has something to do with the hit and run Karen was accused of, they hire a private investigator to prove Karen's innocence. Fenner is proven to have been the person who was running away from where Karen's car was dumped that night. Fenner is later arrested on his and Di's wedding day.

=== Series 7 (2005) ===
This series does not follow up on the Series 6 cliffhanger and Kris and Selena neither feature nor are mentioned in this series. Series 7 sees a big cast upheaval with original officer Fenner leaving along with two other long standing characters, Di and Dr. Malcolm Nicholson.

Di, now Fenner's wife, lies to ensure he is released from prison and Fenner returns, not only to G-Wing, but as Wing Governor. When Bev and Phyl escape to Spain, Neil is demoted to Wing Governor and Fenner promoted to Acting Governing Governor. Before Fenner can start his new job, he is murdered in the "hanging cell" during a memorial service for Yvonne Atkins. The police have a host of suspects to choose from, including new bisexual lifer, Pat Kerrigan (Liz May Brice), a woman who is in jail for murdering her abusive boyfriend and is a recent transfer from Alberton prison. Pat had already managed to develop a feud with Fenner over his treatment of Sheena Williams (Laura Rogers) and her son, Dylan. The increasingly mentally unstable Julie J later reveals that she committed the crime to exact vengeance against Fenner for all his past crimes, in particular, the death of Yvonne. However, it is Fenner's widow Di who is arrested, charged and remanded in custody for the offence. New Governing Governor Joy Masterton (Ellie Haddington) arrives and indicates she will instigate a tough regime at Larkhall.

Meanwhile, Natalie has taken over as G-Wing's new Top Dog. When Natalie and the other inmates find out that new inmate Arun Parmar (Rebecca Hazlewood) is transgender, Natalie makes her life hell until Pat, annoyed by Natalie's bullying of Arun, beats her in a fight and demands she leave Arun alone. Pat develops a romance with recovering drug addict and single mother Sheena before managing to expose Natalie, despite her denials to the contrary, as having been involved in the prostitution of underage girls.

=== Series 8 (2006) ===
The series begins two years after the end of series seven and with the arrival of Emira Al Jahani (Laura Dos Santos), a Muslim whose husband is a suspected terrorist. When Neil and new prisoner Ashley Wilcox (Sandra De Sousa) die and other prisoners fall ill, Emira is accused of biological terrorism. However, it is later established that Neil has been suffering from a previously undiscovered heart condition "Coronary Heart Disease" which would have aided his death from a Legionnaire's Disease outbreak which was caused by a faulty air-conditioning unit, which was discovered when Lou Stoke found the one in Neil's office broken and dripping water.

New G-Wing Governor Lou Stoke (Amanda Donohoe) develops a romance with the prison doctor Rowan Dunlop (Colin Salmon), not knowing he is married; she also tries to find her missing sister. Meanwhile, Pat is sickened by Natalie's use of a child in smuggling drugs into the prison and plans to get rid of her for good. Pat devises a plan in which she will trick Natalie into trying to escape, but Natalie realises she is being tricked and a fight ensues, which ends when Pat fatally hits Natalie over the head with a rock. With the help of the two Julies, Pat disposes of Natalie's body in the sewers beneath the prison, making it seem as if Natalie has indeed escaped from Larkhall.

Inmate Janine Nebeski (Nicola Stapleton) and new prison officer Donny Kimber (Sid Owen) embark on a romance that leaves her pregnant. With help from Bev, Phyl and Tina O'Kane (Victoria Bush), Janine gives birth in her cell and names the baby after Bev. Long-term inmate Tina is released for the second time but, as before, she struggles to adapt to life in the outside world and commits another crime. She takes a bank hostage with a toy gun during which a man suffers a fatal heart attack; she is re-imprisoned again. Joy's long-lost daughter Stella Gough (Helen Modern) turns up as an inmate at the prison, but is shipped out after taking her mother hostage. Darlene Cake (Antonia Okonma) is tricked into killing new inmate Catherine Earlham's husband and tries to commit suicide, but is saved by Donny. Natalie's spirit returns in the last episode to haunt Sylvia and teach her the error of her ways.

== Broadcast ==
=== Syndication ===
Bad Girls received a complete run of repeats on ITV2 following their initial broadcasts on the original channel. In 2005, when new series were still being screened on ITV, the network bid against UKTV Gold for the rights to screen the show from the beginning. From 1 September 2005, the series commenced a re-screening on ITV3, in which the first series was screened. From 5 September 2006, ITV3 again aired the complete first series, with both series two and series three following, and finished broadcast in early 2007. This was the final time ITV broadcast Bad Girls as their rights to the series had expired. In 2006, Five Life had acquired the rights to screen the fourth series, perhaps to pick up where ITV3 had left off. Bad Girls (along with the first series of Footballers' Wives) began airing on the channel in spring 2007 following the third series on ITV3. However, no subsequent series followed on Five Life.

In 2010, CBS Drama acquired the rights to Bad Girls, with the series debuting on 4 October 2010. Initially, for licensing reasons, the first seven series' were only broadcast, between October 2010 and February 2011. After ITV's rights of the eighth series expired, CBS Drama gave the series a re-run from 7 March 2011, with the inclusion of Series Eight, which premiered on the channel in July 2011. The series had been re-screened several times on the channel, again from August 2012 and for the final time from 5 July 2013 in a new late-night time of 12:10 am. In July 2014, CBS Drama announced, via their Facebook page, that they no longer have the rights to show Bad Girls.

After a short hiatus, CBS Drama's sister channel CBS Action began broadcast of the series on 21 October 2015 from Monday to Friday at 10:00 pm, with times varying on some nights. The week's five episodes had been repeated on Saturdays from 9:00 pm. CBS Action's format of the series followed the same format as CBS Drama, in that, the extended episodes which originally screened at 90 minutes on ITV were edited into two parts and shown on consecutive nights. CBS Action completed its first run of the series, with the final episode broadcast on 29 March 2016. Bad Girls once again screened the series from the very beginning on CBS Action from 30 March 2016. No repeated episodes were screened for this run. This run of the series concluded on 6 September 2016, and a third run will not be screened.

Despite the announcement that the series would not return to CBS Drama, it did however appear for the channel's autumn programming line-up, beginning on 3 October 2016, with double episodes airing each weeknight from 10:00 pm, with repeated episodes broadcast over Saturday and Sunday nights. The series was completed on 21 December 2016. A rerun of the series commenced broadcast once again on CBS Drama, with one episode screening each weeknight from 29 March 2017 at 10:00 pm, while all of the week's catch-up episodes screen Saturday nights from 10:00 pm. CBS Drama completed this run on 5 September 2017. A third run of the series on CBS Drama commenced airing from 12 February 2018, with singular episodes screened each weeknight at 11:00 pm and a repeat of the week's episodes on Sundays from 11:00 pm. The Sunday repeats were later removed from the schedule. The final run ended on 20 July 2018 as CBS no longer hold the rights to screen the series.

In 2019, an official YouTube channel dedicated to Bad Girls was launched in the hope of releasing the entire series free to the service, which never eventuated. However, a collection of clips and scenes from each series were instead made available.

In May 2021, Bad Girls was acquired by UKTV for its Drama channel and premiered on 26 July 2021 where it aired Monday to Friday in a late-night timeslot. Only the first week of episodes were repeated on Sunday night. The series is also available to stream on UKTV Play. The series was acquired by BritBox on 23 December, two days after its run ended on Drama. It is also available to stream on ITVX.

=== International ===
The series has endured success outside of the United Kingdom and has established a loyal fan base. It became popular in Australia, despite not attracting high viewing figures when it was first broadcast on the Seven Network in 2000; however, it gained a vast audience when it screened during the 2000 Sydney Olympics. The Seven Network only aired the first three series as it was cancelled due to poor ratings. UKTV in Australia screened the first four series, after which, the series was dropped but was later re aired and the final four series were aired. In New Zealand, it received a complete run when it was broadcast on TV One.

In the United States, Bad Girls was initially broadcast on BBC America, lasting the complete first series and the first ten episodes of the second series and was aired Tuesday nights. It was eventually removed from BBC America's Schedule. Due to its popularity in the U.S., especially among the LGBT community, the series moved to the LGBT-oriented network Logo TV, where it received a full eight-series screening. Similar to the U.S. channel Logo, the series was available in Canada via OutTV which was acquired in 2006 and broadcast all eight series.

In Ireland, the series was broadcast on TV3 from 2001, and by the fifth series, it was exactly in pace with ITV's broadcasts at 9:00 pm, and remained as such until the final episode in 2006. TV3 have re-screened episodes; however, they no longer hold broadcasting rights.

In South Africa, the series endured enormous success when it was broadcast M-NET. While the network was still screening series two in 2001, the cast of Bad Girls travelled to South Africa as part of a promotional tour for the documentary "Bad Girls in South Africa"; due to its growing popularity, the network secured the rights to the third series as the cast were on tour.

In France, under the title "Les condamnées", the series was initially broadcast on NT1 on 12 December 2002", with series one to seven, and AB1 with series one to six. In Luxembourg, Bad Girls is broadcast on RTL9, receiving a seven-series run and is internationally available to viewers in France, Belgium and Switzerland. In Sweden, the series is re-titled "Bakom Järngaller" and it was aired on TV4 with the first seven series'. It has received a complete run in Bosnia and Herzegovina on TVSA and NTV Amna, Estonia, titled as "Pahad tüdrukud", on Kanal 2, Finland on Nelonen, Montenegro on TV Vijesti and Georgia on rustavi 2. A four-series run has been screened in Belgium, where it is broadcast on Vtm and Serbia on TV Košava.

== Reception ==
=== Critical reception ===
Early reviews of the series were generally mixed' However, later reviews were much more favourable. The Daily Telegraph stated that the series is "One of the biggest television drama hits of recent years" and that it was "Almost embarrassingly gripping", while The Guardian said that it is a "Jewel in the Crown of prime time ITV" and that "Network executives must be thankful they have a rare, if unexpected success in Bad Girls." They also said that it is "Less cosy than other dramas ... no sick animals or people are healed." The Guardian also mentioned of an early storyline, in particular, featuring the relationship between Wing-governor Helen Stewart and prisoner Nikki Wade was "praised for its treatment of a homosexual relationship in a responsible way". DVD Monthly reviewed the series and cited that "Bad Girls is a brilliant drama about life in a ladies prison. It's gritty, well written and fully merits the phrase 'hard hitting'" and that it "Makes compulsive viewing and does so with a level of intelligence and honesty".

In a review for New York magazine, John Leonard gave the series a positive review, commenting that "although Bad Girls probably wouldn’t have lasted eight seasons on ITV in Great Britain had it appealed only to lesbians, the prison drama’s strong same-sex story lines were doubtless what got the attention of Logo". He went on to say that "don’t imagine you are tuning in to The L Word behind bars. Bad Girls is much better than that—it has a rough Oz edge and some of the feminist wit of Jonathan Demme’s Caged Heat".

The first three series of Bad Girls were the most successful. After the first three series, the show slightly declined in quality for the fourth and fifth series. Nonetheless, the show continued to earn high viewing figures. Series Six of Bad Girls was considered the most successful series after the first three series as it performed somewhat better than the previous two. The seventh series mostly saw viewing figures drop; although the Series Seven finale, the Christmas special, did perform very well. Series Eight had a further drop in viewing figures, and was the last series before cancellation.

=== Awards and nominations ===
Bad Girls has been nominated for several awards, most notably at the National Television Awards, where it had received a total of nine nominations, winning twice; in 2000 and again in 2001, receiving the award for Most Popular Drama Series, during the point where the series was at its most successful. Debra Stephenson received a nomination for Most Popular Actress in 2001 for her portrayal of Shell Dockley, and was the only cast member in the series ever to receive a nomination at the National Television Awards. The series received further nominations for Most Popular Drama Series each year between 2002 and 2006. The series received eight TV Quick nominations between 2000 and 2004, winning all eight in total; becoming the recipient of four awards for Best Loved Drama from 2000 to 2003, while cast recipients include Debra Stephenson for Best Actress in 2001, Claire King for Best Actress in both 2002 and 2003, and Jack Ellis for Best Actor in 2004. The series also won two Inside Soap Awards in 2003 and 2005.

=== Ratings ===
Series	Timeslot	No. of Episodes	First aired	Last aired	Rank	Avg. viewers (millions)
1	Tuesday 9:00 pm	10	1 June 1999	3 August 1999	15	7.29
2	Tuesday 9:00 pm	13	4 April 2000	4 July 2000	10	8.75
3	Tuesday 9:00 pm	16	20 March 2001	3 July 2001	11	8.63
4	Thursday 9:00 pm	16	28 February 2002	13 June 2002	14	7.05
5	Thursday 9:00 pm	16	8 May 2003	21 August 2003	13	6.88
6	Wednesday 9:00 pm (1–4, 8) Monday 9:00 pm (5–6, 9–12) Tuesday 9:00 pm (7)	12	14 April 2004	23 August 2004	12	7.21
7	Tuesday 9:00 pm (1–12); Monday 9:00 pm (13)	13	10 May 2005	19 December 2005	15	5.60
8	Thursday 9:00 pm (1–10); Wednesday 9:00 pm (11)	11	13 July 2006	20 December 2006	16	4.72

== Home media ==
Initially, Bad Girls had been released on VHS format via the Contender Entertainment Group. The first series was released on 5 June 2000, with the second series was made available on 2 October 2000. Subsequently, the third and fourth series were made available in 2002 and 2003, and the fifth series, which was released by 2 Entertain (then VCI), was available in 2004. These had been the only series to receive VHS releases as the format became obsolete for most titles at this point.

In 2001, Contender commenced releasing the series on DVD. Series One to Four had been released by the company between 2001 and 2003, after which they did not hold the rights to any subsequent series. A box set containing the first four series was available from 2006. Each set did contain several special features including interviews, outtakes, photo galleries, deleted scenes, behind the scenes footage, and a soundtrack CD which was available with Series Three. For the first three series, they had been cropped from their originally-produced 16:9 versions and received an aspect ratio of 4:3, as they had been transfers from the VHS releases. Furthermore, each of the recap sequences at the beginning of each episode had been removed, with the exception of the first and fifth episodes from the third series. The 'Next Time' clips which had started from the end of each Series Three episode (not produced as part of the first two series) had also been removed from the DVD releases. Series Four was virtually untouched, as each episode was available in 16:9, with each recap and 'Next Time' clip package intact. As the title of each episode did not display on the original television airings, they had been included in the opening scene of each episode for the DVD releases.

Distribution company, 2 Entertain acquired the rights to release the series from 2004. Between 2004 and 2006, Series Five to Eight had been released, each bringing newly commissioned artwork, different to the previous styles. Like Series Four, each episode following this was complete and uncut, in an original aspect ratio of 16:9, with recaps and 'Next Time' scenes included. For these new releases, each episode had their series and episode number displayed below the Bad Girls title in the opening sequence. For example, 'Series 5, Episode 1' and so forth. A set comprising Series Five to Eight was made available in 2007. Special features were also included in each set.

Contender and 2 Entertain no longer hold the rights to release the series for home entertainment purposes, and all DVD sets are now out of print.

In 2011 Acorn Media began releasing Bad Girls on DVD from the very beginning. Each series contains newly commissioned artwork, some of the series also contain less discs than in previous releases. Series one has been given new certificate by the BBFC, previously given an '18' for disturbing scenes of violence, it has now been reduced to a '15' certificate. Also for the first time, series one to three has been released in their original widescreen format, and they contain subtitles, as does series four, which were previously not included. Bad Girls: The Complete Collection was released on 2 July 2012, for the first time all eight series are included in a complete boxset. The first three series are now available in their original widescreen 16:9 format with the recap sequences included for Series One and Series Two. Series Three still contains no recap or 'Next Time' clips from the Acorn Media release, except for the recap on the first episode only.

In the first episode of Series One of Bad Girls, the song featured in the ITV broadcasts, "If You Buy This Record (Your Life Will Be Better)" performed by the Tamperer featuring Maya was replaced in both the Contender and Acorn Media releases. In Series Eight, two songs which were featured in the ITV broadcasts, an alternative version of "Peace Train" performed by Dolly Parton and "Y.M.C.A." performed by Village People were replaced in the 2 Entertain and Acorn Media releases. The CBS Drama broadcasts of these episodes contained the same versions as the DVD releases.

DVD title	Release date			Features
DVD title	Region 1	Region 2	Region 4	Features
Series One	9 May 2006	18 June 2001	24 March 2003	10 episodes; 4 discs; BBFC: 18; ACB: MA15+
Series Two	No release	1 October 2001	19 May 2003	13 episodes; 4 discs; BBFC: 15; ACB: MA15+
Series Three	No release	25 March 2002	8 September 2003	16 episodes; 5 discs + CD; BBFC: 15; ACB: MA15+
Series Four	No release	9 June 2003	22 April 2004	16 episodes; 5 discs; BBFC: 15; ACB: MA15+
Series Five	No release	23 August 2004	7 March 2005	16 episodes; 4 discs; BBFC: 15; ACB: MA15+
Series Six	No release	20 June 2005	4 July 2005	12 episodes; 3 discs; BBFC: 15; ACB: MA15+
Series Seven	No release	7 August 2006	18 September 2006	13 episodes; 4 discs; BBFC: 15; ACB: MA15+
Series Eight	No release	26 December 2006	1 September 2007	11 episodes; 3 discs; BBFC: 15; ACB: M
Series 1–4	No release	9 October 2006	No release	55 episodes; 18 discs + CD; BBFC: 18
Series Five to Eight	No release	22 October 2007	No release	52 episodes; 14 discs; BBFC: 15
The Complete Series One (re-issue)	No release	7 February 2011	12 January 2011	10 episodes; 3 discs (Region 2); 4 discs (Region 4); BBFC: 15 (re-rating); ACB: MA15+
The Complete Series Two (re-issue)	No release	18 April 2011	12 January 2011	13 episodes; 4 discs; BBFC: 15; ACB: M (re-rating)
The Complete Series Three (re-issue)	No release	4 July 2011	9 March 2011	16 episodes; 4 discs; BBFC: 15; ACB: M (re-rating)
The Complete Series Four (re-issue)	No release	5 September 2011	9 March 2011	16 episodes; 4 discs (region 2); 5 discs (Region 4); BBFC: 15; ACB: M (re-rating)
The Complete Series Five (re-issue)	No release	3 October 2011	11 May 2011	16 episodes; 4 discs; BBFC: 15; ACB: MA15+
The Complete Series Six (re-issue)	No release	26 December 2011	11 May 2011	12 episodes; 3 discs; BBFC: 15; ACB: MA15+
The Complete Series Seven (re-issue)	No release	20 February 2012	1 June 2011	13 episodes; 3 discs (Region 2); 4 discs (Region 4); BBFC: 15; ACB: MA15+
The Complete Series Eight (re-issue)	No release	2 April 2012	1 June 2011	11 episodes; 3 discs; BBFC: 15; ACB: M
The Complete Collection	No release	2 July 2012	10 November 2010	107 episodes; 28 discs (Region 2); 32 discs (Region 4); BBFC: 15; ACB: MA15+
The Complete Collection (re-issue)	No release	11 September 2017	No release	107 episodes; 18 discs; BBFC: 15

== In other media ==
=== Bad Girls: The Inside Story ===
Bad Girls: The Inside Story, a companion book to the show was written by Jodi Reynolds and Jamie McCallum and published on 8 May 2001 and was to coincide with the third series of Bad Girls, which was currently being broadcast at the time, and at its peak of popularity. The text is a guide to Larkhall prison's G-wing and its most notorious inmates, with additional information on the show. The book is currently out-of-print as of 6 February 2002.

=== Bad Girls: The Musical ===
A musical comedy adaptation, based on the characters and storylines of series 1, including the events of the death of inmate, Rachel Hicks, and the relationship between Wing Governor Helen Stewart and lifer, Nikki Wade. The musical originates with the same creative staff which worked on the television program. Maureen Chadwick and Ann McManus, of Shed Productions, are the book writers of the musical, and Kath Gotts, composer for Bad Girls series 2 – 4, is the composer-lyricist. The first full production of the musical premiered at the West Yorkshire Playhouse in May – June 2006. A West End production began a run at the Garrick Theatre in August 2007, closing in November 2007 (four months earlier than intended). A DVD version of the musical has since been released. A national tour of Bad Girls The Musical has been ruled out.

=== Bad Girls: Most Wanted ===
Following the Series 6 finale on ITV1, a behind-the-scenes special, hosted by Jack Ellis, was broadcast on ITV2 at 10:30 pm on 23 August 2004 and ranked the top ten most popular prisoners of the series. It also included outtakes and clips from Bad Girls: The Musical. The list, in ascending order, includes Tina O’Kane, the Two Julies, Natalie Buxton, the Costa Cons, Denny Blood, Kris Yates, Darlene Cake, Nikki Wade, Shell Dockley and Yvonne Atkins in first place.

=== Proposed remake ===
HBO was developing a U.S. remake, with the same characters and same storylines. Shed Productions had been involved in talks since as early as 2002 regarding a US version of Bad Girls. In 2006 it was announced that FX would be bringing an American version of Bad Girls to US screens, but Shed subsequently vetoed FX's original pilot script after the show was given a "really gritty and unpleasant" feel like that of Oz.

In 2008, Eileen Gallagher, CEO of Shed Productions' parent company Shed Media, announced that HBO bought the rights to the show from FX. HBO's version of Bad Girls was being developed with creative input from Six Feet Under writer Alan Ball, and was to be written by Nancy Oliver and Raelle Tucker. According to Gallagher, the HBO team intended to stick very closely to the characters and storylines from the original show.

In February 2012, it was confirmed that NBC would be developing an American remake version of Bad Girls, but the network eventually passed on the series after confirming its lineup for the 2012–2013 season in May 2012. In October 2012 it was reported that the adaptation would be redeveloped, but no news beyond that was ever reported and the show never came to fruition.

=== Reunion ===
In March 2021, eleven cast members of Bad Girls appeared for a special reunion on the YouTube channel, The Lewis Nicholls Show. Those who appeared included, Victoria Alcock, Victoria Bush, Pauline Campbell, Jack Ellis, Alicya Eyo, Nicole Faraday, Lindsey Fawcett, Claire King, Kerry Norton, Kim Oliver and Debra Stephenson.

In 2014, Simone Lahbib was approached by fans of the show with the suggestion of organising a Bad Girls convention which fans could attend. This also gave her the idea of incorporating within the event an opportunity to raise money for the ‘Eilidh Brown Memorial Fund’ which aims to build a respite holiday home in Stirlingshire for families with children with cancer.

== See also ==
- Within These Walls, British drama series with a similar premise
- Prisoner, Australian drama series with a similar premise, also known as Prisoner: Cell Block H
- Wentworth, Australian drama series and contemporary re-imagining of Prisoner
- Orange is the New Black, American drama series with a similar premise
