= Tristan Sturrock =

British actor (born 1967)

- Born: 1967 (age 58–59); Upton Cross, Cornwall, England
- Occupation: Actor
- Years active: 1986 –present
- Notable work: Kneehigh Theatre; Poldark (2015–)
- Spouse: Katy Carmichael
- Children: 3, including Bronte Carmichael

Tristan Sturrock (born 1967) is a British actor who has worked with the theatre company Kneehigh for over 30 years, performing in many productions including Brief Encounter on Broadway and Tristan and Yseult at the National Theatre. He is an experienced theatre maker and devisor who wrote and performed his award winning autobiographical solo piece Mayday, Mayday which toured internationally and played a sell out run at St Ann's Warehouse, New York.

Sturrock has worked as an actor in film and television for three decades. He played mining captain Zacky Martin in Poldark in all five series, which aired from 2015 to 2019 in the UK.

== Career ==
Sturrock's career commenced in theatre in 1986 when he joined the Cornish based international touring theatre company, Kneehigh Theatre. Throughout his stage career, he has played leading roles on Broadway, the West End and the National Theatre. He starred as Dr. Alec Harvey in Brief Encounter which is perhaps one of his most notable performances. Sturrock has played leading roles in many productions including Peter Carter in A Matter of Life and Death, at the National Theatre (Olivier), The Riot (National Theatre). He played Tristan in the first cast of Emma Rice's acclaimed Tristan and Yseult, (National Theatre Cottesloe) which toured to Sydney and New Zealand and the US. He played the title role in The King of Prussia (Donmar Warehouse) and in 2015 played Maxim De Winter in Rebecca also directed by Emma Rice. In 2024 he reunited with Rice and her company Wise Children to play the title role Blue Beard in a national touring production. Other notable theatre work includes leading roles at the Royal Shakespeare Company including The Spanish Tragedy and The Mysteries directed by Katie Mitchell. He played Orlando in As You Like It at The Royal Exchange Theatre directed by Marianne Elliot.

=== Television ===
Sturrock first appeared on television in 1996 when he had a guest role on the British detective series Wycliffe. Following this, he made appearances on Liverpool 1, The New Adventures of Robin Hood, The Bill, Rescue Me, Holby City and The Royal. In 2002, Sturrock was cast in the role of Officer Colin Hedges on the ITV prison drama series Bad Girls (Series 5, 6 and 7). In 2000 he was cast as Harvey Sloggit in the feature film Saving Grace. He also played Harvey, Martin Clunes' sidekick in the spin-off movies for Doc Martin and Doc Martin and the Legend of the Cloutie (2003), which were prequels to the TV series. He returned to Doc Martin to play Danny Steel, Louisa Glasson’s ex in 2005. The character returned in 2015. Roles followed in Garrow's Law, The Borgias, the television film The Best of Men and The Queen (Channel 4) where he played Peter Townsend. He played Doctor Bernard Gould in Endeavour (2016) and John Wheeler-Bennett in season 2 of The Crown (2017). In 2014 he was cast as Cornish miner and series regular Zacky Martin in Poldark appearing in many episodes across the five seasons as loyal best friend of Ross Poldark played by Aidan Turner. He has appeared in multiple British series including Beyond Paradise, Midsommer Murders, The Tower, Industry, True Love and guest roles in The Death of Bunny Munro, Miss Scarlett and The Duke and Anne Rice’s Vampire series Talamasca. In 2024, he played series regular Dr Mike Willet in ITV medical thriller Malpractice directed by Philip Barantini. In 2026 it was announced Sturrock had been cast as Captain Smollet, captain of the Hispanola in the television series Treasure Island (Paramount and MGM) due for release in late 2026

Sturrock is an associate artist at Bristol Old Vic Theatre where he played Long John Silver in Sally Cookson's Treasure Island and in her critically acclaimed Peter in Peter Pan (Christmas 2012) He played Pongo in 101 Dalmatians (Tobacco Factory). He also played the Friar in Tom Morris's Juliet and her Romeo. More recently he played Cyrano in Cyrano de Bergerac at the Bristol Old Vic also directed by Morris.

It was at Bristol Old Vic Sturrock created his autobiographical one man show Mayday Mayday ; based on the true events of an accident in which he broke his neck falling off a wall during the “Obby Oss” festival in May 2004 in Padstow, Cornwall and the months it took him to recover whilst raising awareness for the spinal injury charity, Aspire. He was airlifted to the Derriford Hospital in Plymouth. He underwent an operation three weeks following the accident and it took him several weeks to learn how to walk again. After a three-month stay in hospital, Sturrock was discharged to his parents' home in Bodmin Moor and attended physiotherapy sessions as an outpatient and twelve months later, he had made a remarkable improvement, however, nerve damage left him with permanent numbness in his fingers, arms, shoulders, and feet. The first showing of Mayday Mayday premiered in Edinburgh (2012) where it won the International Fringe Review Award and was selected by artistic director Susan Feldman to play at St Ann's Warehouse, New York (2013). It went on to play at the Spoleto International Theatre Festival, South Carolina. Mayday Mayday was also adapted as an afternoon play for BBC Radio 4 by Becky Ripley and was broadcast on 1 May 2015. The Radio play won the International Third Coast award (US) was nominated for two BBC Drama awards 2016 – best sound design and a finalist for best drama production.

== Personal life ==
Sturrock is married to actress and director Katy Carmichael, with whom he has three children; a son (born 2004) and two daughters (born 2006 and 2010). The middle daughter Bronte Carmichael is also an actress.

== Filmography ==
Year	Title	Role	Notes
1996	Wycliffe	Paul Mawnan	Series 3, Episode 4 – "Total Loss"
1998	Liverpool 1	Will Timmer	Series 1 – 5 episodes
1998	The New Adventures of Robin Hood	Assassin	Season 3, Episode 10 – "The Assassin"
2000	Saving Grace	Harvey	Feature film
2001	Doc Martin	Harvey	Television film prequel to Saving Grace
2001	The Bill	Jamie Ross	Series 17 – 5 episodes
2002	Rescue Me	The Rev. Simon McDonald	Series 1, Episode 3
2002	Holby City	John Baxter	Series 4, Episode 45 – "New Hearts, Old Scores"
2002	Menace	Peter Jackson	Miniseries
2002	The Project	Sean Sealey	Two-part television film
2003	Doc Martin and the Legend of the Cloutie	Harvey	Television film prequel to Saving Grace
2003	The Royal	Charles Dodds	Series 2, Episode 1 -"All at Sea"
2003–2005	Bad Girls	Colin Hedges	Series 5–7 – 32 episodes
2007	The Bill	David Pritchard	Series 23, Episodes 27 – "Pride Before a Fall"
2009	Garrow's Law	Thomas Rawlings	Series 1 – 2 episodes
2009	The Queen	Peter Townsend	Miniseries – Episode 5 – "Margaret"
2010	The Boy Who Wanted to Be a Lion	Father	Short film
2012	The Best of Men	Sergeant 'Q' Hills	Television film
2013	The Borgias	Doctor	Season 3, Episode 5 – "The Wolf and the Lamb"
2014	Jamaica Inn	Eli Brown	Miniseries – 3 episodes
2005–2015	Doc Martin	Danny Steel	Series 2 & Series 7 – 8 episodes
2015–2018	Poldark	Zacky Martin	Series 1 – 8 episodes Series 2 – 10 episodes Series 3 – 8 episodes Series 4 – 8 episodes Series 5 – 8 episodes
2016	Endeavor	Dr Bernard Gould	ITV
2016	Three Girls	CPS Lawyer	BBC mini-series
2017	The Crown	John Wheeler-Bennett	Netflix; season 2, episode 6, "Vergangenheit"
2017	Strike Back	Dr Stern	Sky
2018	Christopher Robin	Christopher's father (A.A. Milne)	Disney film
2019	Bait		Feature film
2019	Death in Paradise	Adam Renshaw	BBC Series, Series 8, Episode 8
2021	The Tower	Adrian Stephenson	TV Series
2022	Long Way Back	David	Film
2022	My Policeman	Defense Counsel	Film
2022	Miss Scarlet and the Duke	James Elderberry / Mr Blunt	TV Series
2023	Malpractice	Dr. Mike Willett	TV Series
2024	Truelove	Desmond Keeley	TV Mini Series
2024	The Marlow Murder Club	Chris Bott	TV Series
2024	Casualty	Dominic Ryder	TV Series, All I Want for Christmas
2024	Truelove	Pathologist	Channel 4 miniseries
2025	The Forsytes	Professor Heron	Episode 1
2025	The Death of Bunny Munro	MC	TV Series
2025	Talamasca: The Secret Order	Alexander the Vampire	TV Series
2026	Beyond Paradise	Dr. Clive Harris	BBC Series, Series 4, Episode 2
2026	Industry.	Percy Coulson	BBC Series
2026	Bunker		Blue Moon productions
TBC	Treasure Island	Captain Smollet	Paramount & MGM, TV series, Release TBC
