= Philip McGough =

British actor (Born 1950/1951)

- Born: 1950 or 1951 (age 74–75); Penygraig, Wales, United Kingdom
- Occupation: Actor
- Notable work: Bad Girls
- Children: 3

Philip McGough (born 1950 or 1951) is a British actor from Penygraig, Wales. He is a former member of the Royal Shakespeare Company, with many appearances on a variety of television programmes.

== Personal life ==
In an interview with The Mirror in 2001, McGough revealed he had trained as a monk between the ages of 14 and 26. After leaving the order, he worked as a teacher before embarking on a Hippy Trip that failed and led him into acting.

McGough is married and has three children.

== Career ==
McGough made his first big break on TV in Thames Television's series Rooms as Eddie Graham. His well-known television roles include Sergeant Calder, a member of the British Army's bomb disposal squad, in the Doctor Who story Resurrection of the Daleks (1984), secret service detective Edwin Woodhall in the Alan Bleasdale-written drama The Monocled Mutineer (1986), Charles Dawson in soap opera Brookside, the conman Arnie in the Only Fools and Horses episode "Chain Gang" (1989), Provost Marshal in Sharpe's Gold, and Dr Malcolm Nicholson in Bad Girls, a role he played in 28 episodes.

At the 2010 British Soap Awards, he was nominated as Villain of the Year for his portrayal of Dr Nicholson. He appeared in Midsomer Murders "Bantling Boy" as Geoffrey (2005). In 2006, he guest-starred in the audio drama Sapphire and Steel: Perfect Day. McGough also featured in an episode of the popular British mystery series Jonathan Creek, "The Reconstituted Corpse", in which he plays the part of Zola Zbzewski's agent, stalker and murder accomplice. In 2010, he was a regular in Doctors as Dr. Charlie Bradfield.

During the early 1970s, McGough was a member of the Half Moon Theatre Company. McGough was a member of the Royal Shakespeare Company during 1979 appearing in the productions of Antony and Cleopatra as Chief Eunuch Mardian, The Churchill Play, Once in a Lifetime, The White Guard, Wild Oats, Men's Beano and Captain Swing. McGough played Stalin in the 1985 production of Howard Barker's The Power of the Dog at Hampstead Theatre. In 2014, McGough conceived and starred in the BBC Radio 4 programme In Belloc's Footsteps.

== Filmography ==
Year	Title	Role
1982	Give Us This Day	Bert
1983	Forever Young	Ian
1983	Ends and Means	
1989	Forever Green	
1989	Only Fools and Horses	Arnie
1990	The Fool	Mr. Croker
1991	102 Boulevard Haussmann	Dr. Bize
1993	M. Butterfly	Prosecution Attorney
1998	Les Misérables	Judge
1998	One in Something	Man in lift
1999	Don't Go Breaking My Heart	Douglas
2001	The Bench (TV series)	Magistrate Peter Mansell
2001	The Emperor's New Clothes	British tourist
2006	The Illusionist	Dr. Hofzinser
