= Laurence Moody =

English television director (born 1948)

Laurence Moody (born 28 January 1948) is an English television director. After reading English at Cambridge University, Moody worked as a trainee at Granada Television. During his time working at Granada Television, he directed a number of episodes of their top rated ITV1 soap opera, Coronation Street. Moody directed several episodes of ITV's Footballers' Wives.

== Family ==
He is a second cousin removed of the renowned actor, Ron Moody, and the nephew of the former head of light entertainment at Yorkshire Television, Sid Collin. He is married and has three daughters: the actress/producer Clare Lawrence, musician Laura Moody and film co-ordinator Lottie Lawrence.
