= James Gaddas =

English actor (born 1960)

- Born: 17 June 1960 (age 66); Stockton-on-Tees, County Durham, England
- Occupation: Actor
- Years active: 1981–present
- Notable credits: Coronation Street (1989, 1999–2000); Medics (1992–1995); Bad Girls (2002–2006); Doctors (2008, 2011); Emmerdale (2011, 2015); Tracy Beaker Returns (2012); Hollyoaks (2020–2021)
- Spouse: Deborah Gaddas
- Children: 1
- Website: jamesgaddas.com

James Gaddas (born 17 June 1960) is an English actor best known for his roles in Coronation Street, Bad Girls, Doctors, Emmerdale and Hollyoaks.

== Career ==
Gaddas played Eddie Ainsworth in the tenth episode of the seventh series of Heartbeat. Since leaving Bad Girls, Gaddas has appeared as Jackie Elliot in Billy Elliot the Musical, productions of Peter Pan and Spamalot and Bill Anderson in Mamma Mia! in London. Gaddas has also made appearances on The Bill, Between the Lines, Tracy Beaker Returns, Medics, Dogtown, Doctors, Waterloo Road and in 2015, he acted in Emmerdale, playing Ged, who is a prisoner awaiting trial for murder.

In 2017 he played John in the musical The Girls at the Phoenix Theatre in the West End. In 2020, he joined the cast of the Channel 4 soap opera Hollyoaks as Cormac Ranger.

In September 2021, it was announced that Gaddas would write and star in a new version of Bram Stoker's Dracula. Gaddas will portray 15 characters during the show, which is to tour England in 2022 and include music by Jeremy Swift.

== Politics ==
Gaddas was selected as Conservative candidate for Stockton South in the 2005 general election, but finished in second place behind Labour's incumbent Dari Taylor, winning 34.1% of the vote. He left the party shortly afterwards.

== Filmography ==
Year	Title	Role	Notes
1982	Crown Court	PC Robertshaw	Episode: "Window Shopping Part 1"
1983	Seaview	Malcolm	Episode: "In Sickness"
1984	Last Day of Summer	Pete	Television film
1984	The Secret Servant	Major Jackaman	Series 1 Episode 3
1984	Crown Court	Paul Walker	Episode: "Dirty Washing Part 1"
1985	Screen Two	Stretcher bearer	Episode: "The Unknown Soldier"
1985	Late Starter	Mr. Ferrar	Series 1 Episode 3
1985	Summer Season	Sergeant	Episode: "The House on Kirov Street"
1985	Operation Julie	Sid Bell	Television film
1985	Jackanory Playhouse	King Amaranth	Episode: "The Princess and the Lute Player"
1986	Dead Man's Folly	Young Foreign Man	Uncredited
1986	Dempsey and Makepeace	Andy	Episode: "Extreme Prejudice"
1987	A Hazard of Hearts	Lord John Burley	
1987	Crime in the City	Jimmy	Short film
1988	Wish Me Luck	Soldier in cinema	
1988	Troubles	Pike	
1988	The Bill	Sgt. Towers	Episode: "The Silent Gun"
1989	Something for the Weekend	Various roles	Also co-writer
1989	The Pied Piper	RAF driver	Television film
1989	Coronation Street	Robert Prescott	3 episodes
1990	El C.I.D.	Bendel	Episode: "Copping Out"
1991	The Black Candle	Joe Skinner	Television film
1991	Paul Merton: The Series		Series 1 Episode 4
1992	The Camomile Lawn	Tony	5 episodes
1992	Dream Kitchen		
1992	Between the Lines	DS Markham	Episode: "Watching the Detectives"
1992	The Dying of the Light	Terry Lewis	
1992-1995	Medics	Dr Robert Nevin	33 episodes
1993	Drop the Dead Donkey	Gary	Episode: "Awards"
1993	The Bill	Brian Ashmore	Episode: "Tangled Webs"
1994-1995	Class Act	D.I Latham	13 episodes
1997	Backup	PC Jim "Grim" Reaper	6 episodes
1997	The Informant	British I.O	
1997	Bombay Blue	David Jackson	Series 1 Episode 3
1997	Stone Cold	Vince	
1997	Heartbeat	Eddie Ainsworth	Episode: "Playing with Trains"
1998	Human Bomb	Franck	Television film
1998	Girls' Night	Paul	
1998	Peak Practice	Ian Tate	Episode: "A Child I Dreamed"
1998	Grafters	Ray	Series 1 Episode 2
1999	Jonathan Creek	Craig Downey	Episode: "The Eyes of Tiresias"
1999-2000	Coronation Street	Vinny Sorrell	108 episodes
2001	Starhunter	Senaca	2 episodes
2002-2006	Bad Girls	Neil Grayling	52 episodes
2005	Casualty @ Holby City	Carl O'Leary	4 episodes
2005	Holby City	Carl O'Leary	2 episodes
2005	Casualty	Carl O'Leary	2 episodes
2006	Starter for 10	Martin Jackson	
2006	Dogtown	Geogg Torville	6 episodes
2006	Vincent	DI Deighton	Series 2 Episode 3
2008-2011	Doctors	Jack Harcourt	13 episodes
2009	The Bill	Ian Ellis	2 episodes
2009	Heartbeat	Danny Riggs	Episode: "Pass the Parcel"
2012	Waterloo Road	Alan Dixon	2 episodes
2012	Tracy Beaker Returns	Denis	2 episodes
2015	Emmerdale	Ged	6 episodes
2016	Casualty	Howard Munroe	Episode: "Fall on Me"
2017	Against the Law	Governor Cockayne	Television film
2017	Starhunter Redux	Senaca	2 episodes
2017	Casualty	Howard Munroe	Episode: "Crazy Little Thing Called Love"
2020	Outlander	Judge Martin Atticus	Episode: "Better to Marry Than Burn"
2020	A short film about Serial Killing	Sir Anthony Farrow QC	
2020-2021	Hollyoaks	Cormac Ranger	9 episodes
2024	Sister Boniface Mysteries	Lindsay Calder-Marshall	Episode: "It's Just Not Cricket"
