= Helen Fraser (actress) =

English actress (1942–2026)

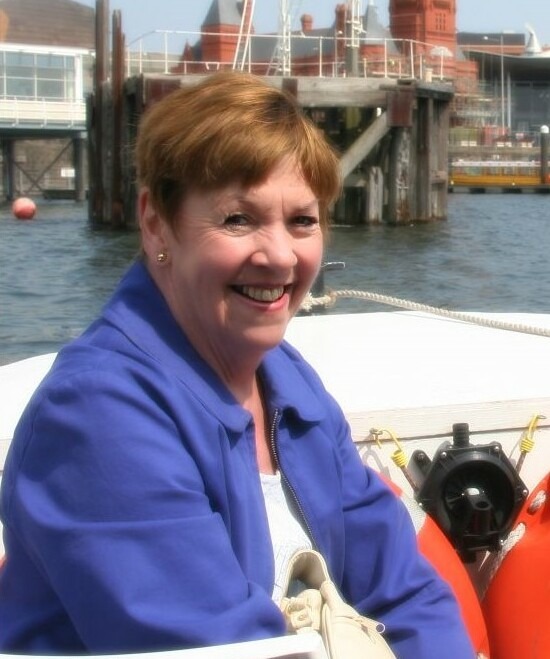
- Fraser in 2011
- Born: Helen Margaret Stronach; 15 June 1942; Oldham, Lancashire, England
- Died: 10 November 2026 (aged 84); Eye, Suffolk, England
- Occupation: Actress
- Years active: 1962–2015
- Spouse: Peter Handford (m. 1964; died 2007)

Helen Fraser (born Helen Margaret Stronach; 15 June 1942 – 10 November 2026) was an English actress, who appeared in many television series from the early 1960s. For international audiences, she may be best known for her roles in Billy Liar (1963) and Repulsion (1965). She is also well known in Britain for portraying the role of miserable warder Sylvia Hollamby in the prison drama series Bad Girls. Fraser appeared in the series from the first episode in 1999 until the last in 2006.

== Early life and career ==
Fraser trained at the Royal Academy of Dramatic Art alongside Tom Courtenay and John Thaw, among others. She gained her breakthrough role alongside Courtenay in Billy Liar (1963). They later played the parents of character Dave Best in the Christmas special of The Royle Family (2008).

She is best known to television viewers for her long-running role in the ITV women's prison drama Bad Girls as unpleasant prison officer Sylvia Hollamby from the first episode in 1999 to the last in 2006. She reprised the role in the West End production of Bad Girls: The Musical in 2007.

Fraser made her television debut in the early 1960s and her credits include Z-Cars, Dixon of Dock Green, The Likely Lads, Doctor in Charge, The Dustbinmen, On the Buses, Rising Damp, Tales of the Unexpected, Duty Free, One Foot in the Grave, Casualty and the very first episode of Man About the House. She also worked on TV with comedians like Dick Emery and the Two Ronnies in the 1970s.

She also appeared on stage, including with the Royal National Theatre, in the West End and in regional theatres across the country. In 2009 and 2010, she toured the UK as Mrs Fisher in a stage version of Billy Liar. In 2011, she joined the tour of Calendar Girls.

Fraser appeared in the ITV soap Coronation Street twice – in 1998 as Magenta Savannah and again in 2013 as Doris Babbage.

In 2015, she appeared in an episode of the BBC daytime soap Doctors.

== Personal life and death ==
In 1964, she married the recording engineer Peter Handford; the couple had met on the set of Billy Liar. Handford died in 2007. Fraser lived in Eye, Suffolk. She died at Yaxley House Care Home, on 10 November 2026, aged 84.

== Filmography ==
Film
Year	Title	Role	Notes
1962	A Kind of Loving	Ingrid's Friend	(Uncredited)
1963	Billy Liar	Barbara	
1965	Repulsion	Bridget	
1966	The Uncle	Mary Ream	
1968	The Birthday Party	Lulu	
1970	Start the Revolution Without Me	Mimi Montage	
1972	Something to Hide	Miss Bunyan	
1974	From Beyond the Grave	Guest	Segment 1: "The Gatecrasher" (uncredited)
1977	Joseph Andrews	Mrs. Adams	
1988	Gorillas in the Mist	Mme. Van Vecten	
2015	Minions	Additional Voices	

Television
Year	Title	Role	Notes
1962, 1965	ITV Play of the Week	Millie/Ellen	2 episodes
1962–1963	Z-Cars	Hilda Stansfield/Vicky Bell	2 episodes
1962	Silent Evidence	Tina	Episode: "Driven to the Brink"
1962	Harpers West One	June Foley	Series 2, Episode 2
1963	Emergency Ward 10	Caroline Baker	8 episodes
1963	Friday Night	Various	4 episodes
1964	The Villains	Pat	Episode: "Amateurs"
1964	No Hiding Place	Jill	Episode: "The Hoarders"
1964	Thursday Theatre	Janey Jenkins	Episode: "The Cure for Love"
1965	The Valiant Varneys		1 episode
1965	Comedy Playhouse	Greta Spavin	Episode: "Here I Come Whoever I Am"
1965–1966	Pardon the Expression	Hilda Norton/Rita Parker	3 episodes
1965–1966	The Likely Lads	Helen	2 episodes
1965	Six of the Best	Vanessa	Episode: "Charlie's Place"
1965	Dixon of Dock Green	Gwen	Episode: "Castles in the Air"
1965–1966	Knock on Any Door	Madge Winter/Polly	2 episodes
1965	Theatre 625	Mrs. Hampton	Episode: "Portraits from the North: The Nutter"
1965–1966	Blackmail	Brenda/Daphne Appleton	2 episodes
1966–1967	The Wednesday Play	Linda/Polly	2 episodes
1966	Mr. John Jorrocks	Emma	Series 1
1967	The Further Adventures of Lucky Jim		Episode: "Quo Vadis, Jim"
1967	Love Story	Sue	Episode: "A Diamond is Forever"
1967	The Gamblers	Joyce	Episode: "Oil and Water"
1969	Doctor in the House	Rigor Mortis	Episode: "Getting the Bird"
1969	Me Mammy	Angela	Episode: "The Day the Saints Went Marching Out"
1969	Dombey and Son	Susan Nipper	Miniseries — 9 episodes
1970	The Dustbinmen	The Goddess	Episode: "Miss Potter and the English Lessons"
1971	The Doctors	Petra Wood	Series 1
1971	Never Mind the Quality, Feel the Width	Doreen Lewton	Episode: "Mix Me a Marriage"
1971	Now Look Here	Tracey	Series 1, Episode 2
1971	On the Buses	Linda	Episode: "Boxing Day Social"
1972–1981	The Dick Emery Show	Lampwick's Daughter	Series 11, 13–19 — 36 episodes
1972–1973	Doctor in Charge	Dr. Mary Bingham/Parsons	Series 1–2 — 6 episodes
1972	A Day Out	Mrs. Ackroyd	TV film
1973	The Upper Crusts	Mrs. Smith	Episode: "Sitting Pretty"
1973	Hunter's Walk	Janet Kenwright	Episode: "Disturbance"
1973	Man About the House	Gabrielle	Episode: "Three's a Crowd"
1974	Sporting Scenes	Helen	Episode: "The Needle Match"
1975	Cilla's Comedy Six	Gloria Cartwright	Episode: "Father's Doing Fine"
1975	...And Mother Makes Five	Miss Finch	Episode: "Legs Eleven"
1975, 1978	Rising Damp	Gwen/Bride	2 episodes
1976	Jumbo Spencer	Mrs. Spencer	Miniseries
1978	BBC2 Play of the Week	Polly Wright	Episode: "Fairies"
1979	Crown Court	Susan Barnes	Serial: "Betrayal of Trust"
1979	Rings on Their Fingers	Mrs. Nicholls	Episode: "Anniversary Jig"
1980	BBC2 Playhouse	Lou Parker	Episode: "The Black Madonna"
1981	Partners	Monica	Episode: "Fair Share"
1981	The Patricia Neal Story	2nd Neighbour	TV film
1982	Tales of the Unexpected	Beryl	Episode: "Blue Marigold"
1982	Sorry!	Psychotherapist	Episode: "Perchance to Dream"
1982	Play for Today	Joyce Midgley	Episode: "Intensive Care"
1983	Dramarama	Joan Osgerby	Episode: "Rip It Up"
1984	Duty Free	Emily	Episode: "Spanish Lace"
1984	The Box of Delights	Ellen	4 episodes
1985	Bird Fancier	Susan Fox	TV film
1985	The Two Ronnies	Woman at the Wake	Series 11, Episode 4
1985	Marjorie and Men	Nora	Episode: "Poor Little Buttercup"
1986	In Loving Memory	Enid Bracegirdle	Episode: "They Shoot Undertakers, Don't They?"
1987	Screen Two	Mrs. Mortland	Episode: "Northanger Abbey"
1988	Beryl Markham: A Shadow on the Sun	June Carberry	Miniseries
1988	Don't Wait Up	Pamela	Series 5, Episode 1
1990	One Foot in the Grave	Dr. Snellgrove	Episode: "The Big Sleep"
1991	The Chief	Angela	Series 2, Episode 6
1994	The Rector's Wife	Trish Pardoe	3 episodes
1994	The Bill	Emily Barker	Episode: "The Sixth Age"
1995	Under the Moon	Miss Prudhomme	TV film
1997	The Uninvited	Charge Nurse	Series 1, Episode 2
1998, 2013	Coronation Street	Magenta Savannah/Doris Babbage	3 episodes
1999–2006	Bad Girls	Sylvia Hollamby	Series 1–8 — 91 episodes (main role)
2003	Casualty	Joan Jowell	3 episodes
2008	The Royle Family	Jocelyn Best	Christmas Special: "The New Sofa"
2015	Doctors	Mary Star	Episode: "Pudding"
