= Jack Ellis (actor) =

British actor (born 1955)

- Born: John Stuart Ellis; 4 June 1955 (age 71); London, United Kingdom
- Occupation: Actor
- Years active: 1977–present
- Spouse: Christine Kavanagh (divorced)
- Partner: Claire Bejanin
- Children: 2
- Relatives: Robin Ellis (brother); Peter Ellis (brother)

John Stuart Ellis (born 4 June 1955) is a British theatre and television actor from London, best known for his portrayal of villainous prison officer Jim Fenner in the TV series Bad Girls. He has also appeared in ITV soap Coronation Street as bookmaker Harry Mason.

He and his former wife Christine Kavanagh, from whom he is now divorced, have two children, Theo and Alice. Theo is the bassist in the Mercury Prize-winning band Wolf Alice. He was educated at Highgate School as were his older brothers Robin Ellis, also an actor, and Peter Ellis, a director.

== Biography ==
Prior to Bad Girls, Ellis's most prominent TV role was Detective Inspector Muddyman in Prime Suspect. Ellis was also seen in Heartbeat, and has appeared in many TV series, including in The Fugitives (2005), playing the part of Salko; Blue Murder in the episode "Steady Eddie", portraying Dan Fulford; Highlander: The Series; and in the film Hunter, where he played the lead role.

Ellis is one of the few performers to have acted in both Inspector Morse and its spin-off series Lewis. His first major part since Bad Girls came in summer 2006; Ellis appeared in several episodes of ITV drama Where the Heart Is as businessman Robert Ashford.

In 1994, Ellis played the part of Eddie Barton, a senior HM Customs & Excise Investigation Division officer based at Heathrow Airport, who had to retire through ill health caused by motor neurone disease in all seven episodes of series one of The Knock. The disease eventually pushes him into paranoia and death by suicide.

In late 2005, Ellis starred in A Few Good Men at London's Theatre Royal, Haymarket, playing opposite Rob Lowe, John Barrowman and Suranne Jones.

Ellis started his role on Coronation Street as the new Rosamund Street betting shop owner Harry Mason in December 2007. He ran the shop with his son Dan, played by ex-The Bill star Matthew Crompton. Also in 2007, Ellis appeared in an episode of Rome.

Ellis starred in the Theatre Royal, Windsor pantomime Peter Pan (Christmas 2008) playing Captain Hook, also at the Opera House Belfast in 2005.

Sam Mendes directed Ellis as Hastings in a William Shakespeare's Richard III starring Kevin Spacey. The show began in June 2011 and toured the world, culminating in a season at the Brooklyn Academy of Music in New York in early 2012.

Later in 2012, he toured in a new production of Dickens' Great Expectations playing Jaggers. The production opened in the West End of London in February 2013 at the Vaudeville Theatre.

In 2014, he starred as Deputy Governor Danforth in the much acclaimed production of The Crucible by Arthur Miller directed by Yael Farber at the Old Vic. Ellis has also performed as the King and Le Diable in Les trois Cheveux d'or du Diable in Montlaur in French, and co-devised and co-directed Shakespeare Mon Amour with Maria Cassi in Florence.

In 2016, Ellis starred as Warden Stammas in the theatre production of Stephen King's The Shawshank Redemption, alongside Paul Nicholls and Ben Onwukwe.

== Filmography ==
Year	Title	Role	Notes
1986	Dead Man's Folly	Police Constable (uncredited)	TV movie
1987	Intimate Contact	2nd Father	Miniseries (1 episode)
1987	Strike It Rich	Steven Bentley	Series 2 (regular, 6 episodes)
1987	A Perfect Spy	Perce Loft	Miniseries (7 episodes)
1988	Inspector Morse	Sergeant	Series 2, Episode 3
1988	The Comic Strip Presents...	Party Guest	Series 4, Episode 5
1989	The Paradise Club	Ginger	Series 1, Episode 1
1990	The Bill	D.S. Hooper	Series 6, Episode 77
1990	Casualty	Sergeant Chancellor	Series 5, Episode 8
1990	Close to Home	David	Series 2, Episode 8
1990	Hollywood Heartbreak	James	Feature film
1991	Lovejoy	Detective Inspector	Series 2, Episode 4
1991–1995	Prime Suspect	DI Tony Muddyman	Series 1, 2 & 4 (regular, 5 episodes)
1991	Chancer	Chief Inspector Beck	Series 2, Episodes 4 & 6
1992	Van der Valk	Frans Opstel	Series 5, Episode 1
1992	A Dangerous Man: Lawrence After Arabia	Security Guard	TV movie
1993	Anna Lee	Hospital Doctor	TV movie (pilot)
1993	Rides	Jerry	Series 2, Episode 1
1994	The Knock	Eddie Barton	Series 1 (regular, 7 episodes)
1994	Casualty	Bernie	Series 9, Episode 3
1994	MacGyver: Trail to Doomsday	Joseph (uncredited)	TV movie
1995	99-1	Lewis	Series 2, Episodes 5 & 6
1995	The Chief	Phil Causley	Series 5, Episode 1
1996	The One That Got Away	SAS Officer	TV movie
1996	Beck	Gavin Mitcham	Series 1, Episodes 1 & 2
1997	Wycliffe	Miles Trednor	Series 4, Episode 3
1997	Wing and a Prayer	Conrad Westholme	Series 1, Episode 3
1997	Thief Takers	Laurie Stone	Series 3, Episodes 7 & 8
1998	Hetty Wainthropp Investigates	Brian Powell	Series 3, Episode 6
1998	Highlander: The Series	Bartholomew	Series 6, Episode 10
1998	City Central	Alex Moore	Series 1, Episode 1
1998	House Gang	Dave	Series 2, Episode 4
1999	An Unsuitable Job for a Woman	Stephen Childs	Series 2, Episode 2
1999–2005	Bad Girls	Jim Fenner	Series 1–7 (regular, 88 episodes)
1999	Heartbeat	Malcolm Colbourne	Series 9, Episode 12
2000	Distant Shadow	Security Guard	Feature film
2002	Waking the Dead	Police Commissioner	Series 2, Episodes 7 & 8
2003	Sweet Medicine	Matthew Lawrence	Series 1, Episode 1
2003	Holby City	Richard Smedley	Series 5, Episode 51
2005	The Fugitives	Salko	Series 1 (regular, 7 episodes)
2006	Lewis	Rex Griffon	Pilot Episode
2006	Where the Heart Is	Robert Ashford	Series 10 (recurring, 6 episodes)
2006	Blue Murder	Dan Fulford	Series 3, Episode 1
2006	Hunter	unnamed role	Short film
2007	Outlaw	Kelly's Father (uncredited)	Feature film
2007	Rome	Bibulus	Series 2, Episode 9
2007–2008	Coronation Street	Harry Mason	(Regular, 85 episodes)
2008	House of Saddam	US Section Commander	Miniseries (1 episode)
2009	It's Alive	Prof. Baldwin	Feature film
2010	Sailor Boy	Tug	Short film
2012	Candle to Water	Marlow	Feature film
2013	Great Expectations	Jaggers	Screened theatre production
2013	Stand	Him (voice)	Short film
2014	New Tricks	David Halburton	Series 11, Episode 7
2014	The Crucible	Deputy Governor Danforth	Screened theatre production
2016	Vera	Brian Hallam	Series 6, Episode 3
2017	8 Days That Made Rome	Julius Caesar	Miniseries (1 episode)
2018	Versailles	Prison Governor	Series 3, Episodes 2, 3 & 4
2019	Doctors	David Anderston	Series 20, Episode 44
