= Antonia Okonma =

British actress

- Born: 24 July 1982 (age 44); London, England
- Education: London South Bank University
- Occupation: Actress
- Years active: 2004–2009
- Notable work: Bad Girls (2004–2006)
- Spouse: Richard Shittu (m. 2012)
- Children: 3

Antonia Okonma (born 24 July 1982) is a British actress. She is best known for playing the role of Darlene Cake in the ITV series Bad Girls from 2004 to 2006.

== Early life and education ==
Antonia Okonma was born and raised in London. She was born into a Nigerian Igbo family. Okonma has Degrees in Accounting and Finance. She trained with the Royal's Court Young People's Theatre for 2years.

== Career ==
In 2003, Okonma was cast in role of Darlene Cake in the ITV prison drama series Bad Girls, first appearing in the sixth series, which broadcast in 2004. The character of Darlene Cake was of Jamaican origin, which required Okonma to speak with a Jamaican accent. She appeared in the sixth, seventh and eighth series, making her final appearance in the penultimate episode in 2006, when Darlene attempts suicide by setting herself on fire. Although, she is seen to have survived, her fate is left unknown and was not explained in the final episode. Following the conclusion of the sixth series, a behind-the-scenes special, titled Bad Girls: Most Wanted, was broadcast on ITV2 and ranked the top 10 greatest characters as voted for by viewers; Darlene Cake was voted at fourth place. In 2004, Okonma won a Gathering of Africa's Best (GAB) award for Best Newcomer and a Screen Nation award for Best Emerging Talent for her work in Bad Girls.

Following her role on Bad Girls', Okonma received roles in the British feature films Screaming Blue Murder and Rabbit Fever, and a minor role on the BBC miniseries Moses Jones in 2009.

On stage, Okonma has acted at the Royal Court and the Riverside Studios. She starred in Torn at the Arcola Theatre alongside Brooke Kinsella and Jocelyn Jee Esien. She is currently playing the title role in the production of Iya Ile (The First Wife) at Soho Theatre.

Okonma has also taken part in the reality TV programmes Strictly African Dancing. She also performed as Tina Turner on celebrity Stars in Their Eyes. In late 2007, she was a contestant on the second series of Cirque de Celebrité on Sky One.

== Personal life ==
Okonma is married with three children.

== Filmography ==
Acting
Year	Title	Role	Notes
2004	RUF 992m	Aleysha	Short film
2004–2006	Bad Girls	Darlene Cake	Series 6–8 (main role, 34 episodes)
2004	Bad Girls: Most Wanted	Darlene Cake	Documentary (archive footage)
2006	Screaming Blue Murder	Flipbook Fillie #1	Feature film
2006	Rabbit Fever	Rude Girl #1	Feature film
2009	Moses Jones	Hairdresser	Miniseries (guest role, 1 episode)

Self appearances
Year	Title	Notes
2004	Trisha	"Bad Girls"; episode dated 9 December 2004
2005	Celebrity Wrestling	Series 1, episode 4; dated 14 May 2005
2005	GMTV	Dated 31 May 2005
2005	Strictly Come Dancing	"Strictly African Dancing"; special dated 9 July 2005
2005	National Television Awards	Dated 25 October 2005
2005	The Brendan Courtney Show	Series 1, episode 5; dated 7 December 2005
2006	An Audience with Joan Rivers	Dated 14 January 2006 (audience member)
2006	An Audience with Shirley Bassey	Dated 10 March 2006 (audience member)
2006	Stars in Their Eyes	"Celebrity Special"; dated 8 April 2006 (as Tina Turner)
2006	The Prince's Trust 30th Birthday	Live showing; dated 20 May 2006
2006	GMTV	Dated 13 July 2006
2006	The Sharon Osbourne Show	Series 1, episode 7; dated 6 September 2006
2006	Screen Nation Film and Television Awards	Dated 22 October 2006
2006	National Television Awards	Dated 31 October 2006
2006	Children in Need	Dated 17 November 2006 (performer)
2007	Weakest Link	"Goodies and Badies"; special dated 24 March 2007
2007	Through the Keyhole	Dated 26 March 2007
