= List of awards and nominations received by Hollyoaks =

Hollyoaks is a British television soap opera that has aired on Channel 4 since 23 October 1995. The soap has earned various awards and nominations over the years for its storylines, performances from the ensemble cast and production team.

== All About Soap Awards ==
The All About Soap Awards (formerly The All About Soap Bubble Awards) were presented by All About Soap magazine and voted for by the public. They started in 2002.

Year	Category	Recipients	Result	Ref(s)
2002	Most Snog-alicious Scene	Ben and Laura	Nominated	
2002	Pass the Tissues	Lewis passing away	Nominated	
2003	Top of the Plots	Tragedy strikes on the potholing trip	Nominated	
2003	Snog Shocker	Mandy and Luke	Nominated	
2003	Wear it Well	Wacky Kart road race	Nominated	
2009	Celeb Style	Jennifer Metcalfe (Mercedes McQueen)	Won	
2009	Tearjerker	Max's death	Won	
2009	Killer Secret	Niall's revenge	Won	
2010	Celeb Style	Jennifer Metcalfe (Mercedes McQueen)	Nominated	
2010	Fatal Attraction	Ricky Whittle & Jennifer Metcalfe (Calvin Valentine & Mercedes McQueen)	Nominated	
2010	I'm A Survivor	Emma Rigby (Hannah Ashworth)	Nominated	
2010	Smooth Criminal	Ricky Whittle (Calvin Valentine)	Nominated	
2011	Best Actor	Emmett J. Scanlan (Brendan Brady)	Nominated	
2011	Best Actress	Claire Cooper (Jacqui McQueen)	Nominated	
2011	Best Celeb Style	Jennifer Metcalfe (Mercedes McQueen)	Nominated	
2011	Best Celeb Style	Jorgie Porter (Theresa McQueen)	Nominated	
2011	Best Comeback	Jamie Lomas (Warren Fox)	Nominated	
2011	Best Love Triangle	Kieron Richardson, Emmett J. Scanlan & Alice Barlow (Ste Hay, Brendan Brady & Rae Wilson)	Won	
2011	Best Newcomer	Rachel Shenton (Mitzeee Minniver)	Nominated	
2011	Best Stunt	Il Gnosh fire	Nominated	
2012	Best Actor	Emmett J. Scanlan (Brendan Brady)	Won	
2012	Best Actress	Claire Cooper (Jacqui McQueen)	Nominated	
2012	Best Comeback	Carley Stenson (Steph Roach)	Nominated	
2012	Best Dressed Soap Star	Jorgie Porter (Theresa McQueen)	Won	
2012	Best Episode	Halloween murder	Won	
2012	Best Mystery	Who's the father of Mercedes' baby?	Nominated	
2012	Best Villain	Jeff Rawle (Silas Blissett)	Won	
2013	Best Death	Rob Norbury (Riley Costello)	Nominated	
2013	Best Reveal	Walker's an undercover cop	Nominated	
2013	Best Storyline	Esther's bullying	Won	
2013	Best Stunt	Wedding day bus crash	Won	
2013	Forbidden Lovers	Emmett J. Scanlan & Kieron Richardson (Brendan Brady & Ste Hay)	Won	

== British Academy Scotland Awards ==
Year	Category	Recipients	Result	Ref(s)
2016	Best Actress in Television	Annie Wallace (Sally St. Claire)	Nominated	

== British Academy Television Awards ==
The British Academy Television Awards were launched in 1954 and are presented during an annual award show hosted by the British Academy of Film and Television Arts.

Year	Category	Recipients	Result	Ref(s)
1999	Best Soap Opera	Hollyoaks	Nominated	
2001	Best Soap Opera	Hollyoaks	Nominated	
2002	Best Soap Opera	Hollyoaks	Nominated	
2003	Best Soap Opera	Hollyoaks	Nominated	
2015	Best Soap and Continuing Drama	Hollyoaks	Nominated	
2017	Best Soap and Continuing Drama	Hollyoaks	Nominated	
2018	Best Soap and Continuing Drama	Hollyoaks	Nominated	
2019	Best Soap and Continuing Drama	Hollyoaks	Nominated	
2021	Best Soap and Continuing Drama	Hollyoaks	Nominated	

== British Soap Awards ==
The British Soap Awards is an annual awards ceremony which honours the best of British soap operas. The first event took place in 1999.

Year	Category	Recipients	Result	Ref(s)
1999	Best Dramatic Performance	Kerrie Taylor (Lucy Benson)	Nominated	
1999	Best Storyline	Sarah Jayne Dunn: Mandy Richardson's triumph over her sexually-abusive father	Nominated	
1999	Best Soap	Hollyoaks	Nominated	
1999	Sexiest Female	Davinia Taylor (Jude Cunningham)	Nominated	
1999	Sexiest Female	Natalie Casey (Carol Groves)	Nominated	
1999	Sexiest Female	Natasha Symms (Kate Patrick)	Nominated	
1999	Sexiest Male	Jeremy Edwards (Kurt Benson)	Nominated	
1999	Sexiest Male	James Redmond (Finn)	Nominated	
1999	Sexiest Male	Paul Danan (Sol Patrick)	Nominated	
1999	Best Actress	Sarah Jayne Dunn (Mandy Richardson)	Nominated	
1999	Best Actress	Terri Dwyer (Ruth Osborne)	Nominated	
1999	Best Actress	Kerrie Taylor (Lucy Benson)	Nominated	
1999	Best Actor	Paul Danan (Sol Patrick)	Nominated	
1999	Best Actor	Ben Hull (Lewis Richardson)	Nominated	
1999	Best Actor	Nick Pickard (Tony Hutchinson)	Nominated	
1999	Villain of the Year	Davinia Taylor (Jude Cunningham)	Nominated	
1999	Villain of the Year	Warren Derosa (Rob Hawthorne)	Nominated	
1999	Villain of the Year	David McAlister (Dennis Richardson)	Nominated	
2000	Best Newcomer	Gary Lucy (Luke Morgan)	Won	
2000	Sexiest Female	Natalie Casey (Carol Groves)	Nominated	
2000	Sexiest Female	Joanna Taylor (Geri Hudson)	Nominated	
2000	Sexiest Female	Terri Dwyer (Ruth Osborne)	Nominated	
2000	Sexiest Male	James Redmond (Finn)	Nominated	
2000	Sexiest Male	Paul Danan (Sol Patrick)	Nominated	
2000	Sexiest Male	Ben Hull (Lewis Richardson)	Nominated	
2000	Best Actress	Kerrie Taylor (Lucy Benson)	Nominated	
2000	Best Actress	Stephanie Waring (Cindy Cunningham)	Nominated	
2000	Best Actress	Terri Dwyer (Ruth Osborne)	Nominated	
2000	Best Actor	Nick Pickard (Tony Hutchinson)	Nominated	
2000	Best Actor	Gary Lucy (Luke Morgan)	Nominated	
2000	Best Actor	Paul Danan (Sol Patrick)	Nominated	
2000	Villain of the Year	Warren Derosa (Rob Hawthorne)	Nominated	
2000	Villain of the Year	Natasha Symms (Kate Patrick)	Nominated	
2000	Villain of the Year	Daniel Pape (Sean Tate)	Nominated	
2001	Special Achievement Award	Phil Redmond (Creator)	Won	
2002	Spectacular Scene of the Year	Adam and Mandy's Car Crash	Won	
2002	Best Soap	Hollyoaks	Nominated	
2002	Sexiest Female	Joanna Taylor (Geri Hudson)	Nominated	
2002	Sexiest Female	Gemma Atkinson (Lisa Hunter)	Nominated	
2002	Sexiest Female	Sarah Jayne Dunn (Mandy Richardson)	Nominated	
2002	Sexiest Male	Marcus Patric (Ben Davies)	Nominated	
2002	Sexiest Male	Andy McNair (Dan Hunter)	Nominated	
2002	Sexiest Male	Gary Lucy (Luke Morgan)	Nominated	
2002	Best Actor	Matt Littler (Max Cunningham)	Nominated	
2002	Best Actor	Nick Pickard (Tony Hutchinson)	Nominated	
2002	Best Actor	Ben Hull (Lewis Richardson)	Nominated	
2002	Best Actress	Joanna Taylor (Geri Hudson)	Nominated	
2002	Best Actress	Gemma Atkinson (Lisa Hunter)	Nominated	
2002	Best Actress	Sarah Jayne Dunn (Mandy Richardson)	Nominated	
2002	Villain of the Year	Daniel Hyde (Scott Anderson)	Nominated	
2002	Villain of the Year	Lesley Johnston (Laura Burns)	Nominated	
2002	Villain of the Year	Ben Hull (Lewis Richardson)	Nominated	
2003	Best Soap	Hollyoaks	Nominated	
2003	Sexiest Female	Elize du Toit (Izzy Cornwell)	Nominated	
2003	Sexiest Female	Ali Bastian (Becca Hayton)	Nominated	
2003	Sexiest Female	Laila Rouass (Dale Jackson)	Nominated	
2003	Sexiest Male	Daniel Hyde (Scott Anderson)	Nominated	
2003	Sexiest Male	Marcus Patric (Ben Davies)	Nominated	
2003	Sexiest Male	Gary Lucy (Luke Morgan)	Nominated	
2003	Best Actress	Elize du Toit (Izzy Cornwell)	Nominated	
2003	Best Actress	Gemma Atkinson (Lisa Hunter)	Nominated	
2003	Best Actress	Sarah Jayne Dunn (Mandy Richardson)	Nominated	
2003	Best Actor	Marcus Patric (Ben Davies)	Nominated	
2003	Best Actor	David Brown (Adam Morgan)	Nominated	
2003	Best Actor	Jamie Luke (Norman Sankofa)	Nominated	
2003	Villain of the Year	Daniel Hyde (Scott Anderson)	Nominated	
2003	Villain of the Year	Lesley Johnston (Laura Burns)	Nominated	
2004	Best Comedy Performance	Alex Carter (Lee Hunter)	Won	
2005	Sexiest Female	Jodi Albert (Debbie Dean)	Won	
2006	Best Storyline	Justin and Becca's Affair	Won	
2006	Best Dramatic Performance from a Young Actor or Actress	Ellis Hollins (Tom Cunningham)	Won	
2006	Best Soap	Hollyoaks	Nominated	
2006	Best Actor	Chris Fountain (Justin Burton)	Nominated	
2006	Best Actor	Matt Littler (Max Cunningham)	Nominated	
2006	Best Actor	Nick Pickard (Tony Hutchinson)	Nominated	
2006	Best Actress	Ali Bastian (Becca Hayton)	Nominated	
2006	Best Actress	Sarah Jayne Dunn (Mandy Richardson)	Nominated	
2006	Best Actress	Cassie Powney (Mel Burton)	Nominated	
2006	Sexiest Male	Chris Fountain (Justin Burton)	Nominated	
2006	Sexiest Male	Stuart Manning (Russ Owen)	Nominated	
2006	Sexiest Male	Kevin Sacre (Jake Dean)	Nominated	
2006	Sexiest Female	Ali Bastian (Becca Hayton)	Nominated	
2006	Sexiest Female	Sarah Jayne Dunn (Mandy Richardson)	Nominated	
2006	Sexiest Female	Roxanne McKee (Louise Summers)	Nominated	
2006	Villain of the Year	Warren Brown (Andy Holt)	Nominated	
2006	Villain of the Year	Chris Fountain (Justin Burton)	Nominated	
2006	Villain of the Year	Louis Tamone (Sam Owen)	Nominated	
2006	Best Exit	Warren Brown (Andy Holt)	Nominated	
2006	Most Spectacular Scene of the Year	Warren Brown (Andy Holt)	Nominated	
2006	Best Newcomer	Jessica Fox (Nancy Hayton)	Nominated	
2007	Best Comedy Performance	Gemma Merna (Carmel McQueen)	Won	
2007	Villain of the Year	Gemma Bissix (Clare Devine)	Won	
2007	Sexiest Female	Roxanne McKee (Louise Summers)	Won	
2008	Best Actor	Chris Fountain (Justin Burton)	Won	
2008	Best Actress	Emma Rigby (Hannah Ashworth)	Won	
2008	Sexiest Female	Roxanne McKee (Louise Summers)	Won	
2008	Best Exit	Gemma Bissix (Clare Devine)	Won	
2008	Best On-Screen Partnership	Matt Littler & Darren Jeffries (Max Cunningham & Sam "O.B." O'Brien)	Won	
2008	Spectacular Scene of the Year	Clare and Katy drive off the cliff	Won	
2010	Spectacular Scene of the Year	Sarah's Parachute Jump	Won	
2011	Best Newcomer	Emmett J. Scanlan (Brendan Brady)	Won	
2011	Villain of the Year	Emmett J. Scanlan (Brendan Brady)	Won	
2013	Best Actor	Emmett J. Scanlan (Brendan Brady)	Nominated	
2013	Best Actress	Claire Cooper (Jacqui McQueen)	Won	
2013	Best British Soap	Hollyoaks	Nominated	
2013	Best Comedy Performance	Nicole Barber-Lane (Myra McQueen)	Nominated	
2013	Best Dramatic Performance	Claire Cooper (Jacqui McQueen)	Nominated	
2013	Best Episode	"The Bus Crash"	Nominated	
2013	Best Exit	Emmett J. Scanlan (Brendan Brady)	Nominated	
2013	Best Newcomer	Joseph Thompson (Dr. Paul Browning)	Won	
2013	Best On-Screen Partnership	Emmett J. Scanlan & Kieron Richardson (Brendan Brady & Ste Hay)	Won	
2013	Best Storyline	Esther's bullying	Nominated	
2013	Best Young Performance	Ellis Hollins (Tom Cunningham)	Nominated	
2013	Sexiest Female	Jorgie Porter (Theresa McQueen)	Nominated	
2013	Sexiest Male	Danny Mac (Dodger Savage)	Won	
2013	Sexiest Male	Kieron Richardson (Ste Hay)	Nominated	
2013	Spectacular Scene of the Year	The Bus Crash	Won	
2014	Best Actor	Kieron Richardson (Ste Hay)	Nominated	
2014	Best Actor	Jeremy Sheffield (Patrick Blake)	Nominated	
2014	Best Actress	Stephanie Davis (Sinead O'Connor)	Nominated	
2014	Best Actress	Nikki Sanderson (Maxine Minniver)	Nominated	
2014	Best British Soap	Hollyoaks	Won	
2014	Best Comedy Performance	Dan Tetsell (Jim McGinn)	Nominated	
2014	Best Dramatic Performance	Stephanie Davis (Sinead O'Connor)	Nominated	
2014	Best On-Screen Partnership	Jennifer Metcalfe & Joseph Thompson (Mercedes McQueen & Dr. Paul Browning)	Nominated	
2014	Best Newcomer	Charlie Clapham (Freddie Roscoe)	Nominated	
2014	Best Single Episode	John Paul's rape ordeal	Nominated	
2014	Best Storyline	Sienna steals Nancy's life	Nominated	
2014	Best Young Performance	Ellis Hollins (Tom Cunningham)	Won	
2014	Sexiest Female	Jennifer Metcalfe (Mercedes McQueen)	Nominated	
2014	Sexiest Female	Jorgie Porter (Theresa McQueen)	Nominated	
2014	Sexiest Male	Ashley Taylor Dawson (Darren Osborne)	Nominated	
2014	Sexiest Male	Danny Mac (Dodger Savage)	Won	
2014	Spectacular Scene of the Year	"Hollyoaks Blast"	Nominated	
2014	Villain of the Year	Jesse Birdsall (Fraser Black)	Nominated	
2014	Villain of the Year	Anna Passey (Sienna Blake)	Won	
2014	Villain of the Year	Greg Wood (Trevor Royle)	Nominated	
2015	Best Actress	Nikki Sanderson (Maxine Minniver)	Nominated	
2015	Best British Soap	Hollyoaks	Nominated	
2015	Best Comedy Performance	Fabrizio Santino (Ziggy Roscoe)	Nominated	
2015	Best Dramatic Performance	Keith Rice (Finn O'Connor)	Nominated	
2015	Best Newcomer	Twinnie Lee Moore (Porsche McQueen)	Nominated	
2015	Best On-Screen Partnership	Ellis Hollins & Ruby O'Donnell (Tom Cunningham & Peri Lomax)	Nominated	
2015	Best Storyline	John Paul's rape ordeal	Nominated	
2015	Best Young Performance	Ruby O'Donnell (Peri Lomax)	Nominated	
2015	Scene of the year	The Train Crash	Nominated	
2015	Villain of the Year	Jeremy Sheffield (Patrick Blake)	Won	
2016	Best Actor	Kieron Richardson (Ste Hay)	Nominated	
2016	Best Actress	Jennifer Metcalfe (Mercedes McQueen)	Nominated	
2016	Best British Soap	Hollyoaks	Nominated	
2016	Best Comedy Performance	Ross Adams (Scott Drinkwell)	Nominated	
2016	Best Female Dramatic Performance	Zöe Lucker (Reenie McQueen)	Nominated	
2016	Best Male Dramatic Performance	Jeremy Sheffield (Patrick Blake)	Nominated	
2016	Best Newcomer	Duayne Boachie (Zack Loveday)	Nominated	
2016	Best On-Screen Partnership	Ashley Taylor Dawson & Jessica Fox (Darren & Nancy Osborne)	Nominated	
2016	Best Single Episode	Patrick's right to die decision	Nominated	
2016	Best Storyline	The McQueen's Cycle of Abuse	Nominated	
2016	Best Young Performance	Ruby O'Donnell (Peri Lomax)	Won	
2016	Scene of the Year	Nico kills Patrick	Nominated	
2016	Villain of the Year	Sophie Austin (Lindsey Roscoe)	Nominated	
2017	Best Actor	Gregory Finnegan (James Nightingale)	Nominated	
2017	Best Actor	Jamie Lomas (Warren Fox)	Nominated	
2017	Best Actress	Anna Passey (Sienna Blake)	Nominated	
2017	Best British Soap	Hollyoaks	Nominated	
2017	Best Comedy Performance	Nicole Barber-Lane (Myra McQueen)	Nominated	
2017	Best Female Dramatic Performance	Nadine Rose Mulkerrin (Cleo McQueen)	Nominated	
2017	Best Male Dramatic Performance	Kieron Richardson (Ste Hay)	Nominated	
2017	Best Newcomer	Duncan James (Ryan Knight)	Nominated	
2017	Best On-Screen Partnership	Richard Linnell & Kassius Nelson (Alfie Nightingale & Jade Albright)	Won	
2017	Best Single Episode	"What Is Consent?"	Nominated	
2017	Best Storyline	Teenage Cancer	Nominated	
2017	Best Young Actor	Ela-May Demircan (Leah Barnes)	Nominated	
2017	Outstanding Achievement	Nick Pickard (Tony Hutchinson)	Won	
2017	Scene of the Year	Jade says goodbye to Alfie	Won	
2017	Villain of the Year	Persephone Swales-Dawson (Nico Blake)	Nominated	
2018	Best British Soap	Hollyoaks	Nominated	
2018	Best Actor	Theo Graham (Hunter McQueen)	Nominated	
2018	Best Actor	Richard Linnell (Alfie Nightingale)	Longlisted	
2018	Best Actor	Gary Lucy (Luke Morgan)	Longlisted	
2018	Best Actress	Amy Conochan (Courtney Campbell)	Longlisted	
2018	Best Actress	Anna Passey (Sienna Blake)	Nominated	
2018	Best Actress	Harvey Virdi (Misbah Maalik)	Longlisted	
2018	Greatest Moment	Alfie Nightingale Says Goodbye to Jade Albright (Alfie Nightingale and Kassius Nelson)	Nominated	
2018	Villain of the Year	David Easter (Mac Nightingale)	Nominated	
2018	Best Male Dramatic Performance	Ross Adams (Scott Drinkwell)	Won	
2018	Best Female Dramatic Performance	Nadine Rose Mulkerrin (Cleo McQueen)	Nominated	
2018	Best Comedy Performance	Nicole Barber-Lane (Myra McQueen)	Nominated	
2018	Best Young Actor	Elà-May Demircan (Leah Barnes)	Nominated	
2018	Scene of the Year	Scott Drinkwell's Suicide Note (Ross Adams)	Nominated	
2018	Best On-Screen Partnership	Malique Thomson-Dwyer and Theo Graham (Prince and Hunter McQueen)	Won	
2018	Best Newcomer	Lauren McQueen (Lily Drinkwell)	Nominated	
2018	Best Storyline	Lily Drinkwell's Self-harm (Lauren McQueen)	Won	
2018	Best Single Episode	"Three Mothers, Three Daughters"	Won	
2019	Best British Soap	Hollyoaks	Won	
2019	Best Actor	Gregory Finnegan (James Nightingale)	Won	
2019	Best Actress	Lauren McQueen (Lily McQueen)	Nominated	
2019	Villain of the Year	Nathan Sussex (Buster Smith)	Won	
2019	Best Male Dramatic Performance	Adam Woodward (Brody Hudson)	Won	
2019	Best Female Dramatic Performance	Nadine Rose Mulkerrin (Cleo McQueen)	Nominated	
2019	Best Comedy Performance	Jessamy Stoddart (Liberty Savage)	Nominated	
2019	Best Young Actor	Lacey Findlow (Dee Dee Hutchinson)	Nominated	
2019	Scene of the Year	Brody (Woodward) confronts his abuser, Buster (Sussex)	Nominated	
2019	Best On-Screen Partnership	Nick Pickard and Alex Fletcher (Diane & Tony Hutchinson)	Nominated	
2019	Best Newcomer	Tylan Grant (Brooke Hathaway)	Nominated	
2019	Best Storyline	Footballer abuse	Nominated	
2019	Best Single Episode	"Where Do I Belong?"	Nominated	
2022	Best British Soap	Hollyoaks	Nominated	
2022	Best Comedy Performance	Chelsee Healey (Goldie McQueen)	Nominated	
2022	Best Dramatic Performance	Harvey Virdi (Misbah Maalik)	Nominated	
2022	Best Family	The McQueens	Nominated	
2022	Best Leading Performer	Kéllé Bryan (Martine Deveraux)	Nominated	
2022	Best Leading Performer	Jamie Lomas (Warren Fox)	Nominated	
2022	Best Leading Performer	Gary Lucy (Luke Morgan)	Nominated	
2022	Best Newcomer	Matthew James-Bailey (Ethan Williams)	Nominated	
2022	Best On-Screen Partnership	Anna Passey & Kieron Richardson (Sienna Blake & Ste Hay)	Nominated	
2022	Best Single Episode	"Out of Time"	Nominated	
2022	Best Storyline	Misbah's Historic Rape	Won	
2022	Best Young Performer	Jayden Fox (Bobby Costello)	Nominated	
2022	Scene of the Year	Misbah Didn't Consent	Won	
2022	Villain of the Year	Rhiannon Clements (Summer Ranger)	Nominated	
2023	Best British Soap	Hollyoaks	Nominated	
2023	Best Comedy Performance	Kieron Richardson (Ste Hay)	Nominated	
2023	Best Dramatic Performance	Nikki Sanderson (Maxine Minniver)	Nominated	
2023	Best Family	The McQueens	Nominated	
2023	Best Leading Performer	Niamh Blackshaw (Juliet Nightingale)	Nominated	
2023	Best Leading Performer	Richard Blackwood (Felix Westwood)	Nominated	
2023	Best Leading Performer	Anna Passey (Sienna Blake)	Nominated	
2023	Best Leading Performer	Ijaz Rana (Imran Maalik)	Nominated	
2023	Best Leading Performer	Owen Warner (Romeo Nightingale)	Nominated	
2023	Best Newcomer	Anya Laurence (Vicky Grant)	Nominated	
2023	Best On-Screen Partnership	Richard Blackwood & Jamie Lomas (Felix Westwood & Warren Fox)	Nominated	
2023	Best Single Episode	"Long Walk Home"	Nominated	
2023	Best Storyline	Incel Eric Targets Mason and Maxine	Won	
2023	Best Young Performer	Jayden Fox (Bobby Costello)	Nominated	
2023	Scene of the Year	Zoe Tells Abused Maxine "It's not your fault"	Nominated	
2023	Villain of the Year	Angus Castle-Doughty (Eric Foster)	Nominated	

== Creative Diversity Network Soap Award ==
Year	Category	Recipients	Result	Ref(s)
2012	Radio Times Creative Diversity Network Soap Award	Hollyoaks – Episode: 1 December 2011	Nominated	

== Digital Spy Soap Awards ==
The Digital Spy Soap Awards are hosted by the entertainment website Digital Spy. The first awards were presented in 2008, where Hollyoaks was nominated in 12 of the 14 categories. From 2014, Digital Spy began holding the Digital Spy Reader Awards.

Year	Category	Recipients	Result	Ref(s)
2008	Best Child Actor (Under 16)	Ellis Hollins (Tom Cunningham)	Won	
2008	Best Exit	Gemma Bissix (Clare Cunningham)	Won	
2008	Best Exit	Guy Burnet (Craig Dean)	Nominated	
2008	Best Newcomer	Summer Strallen (Summer Shaw)	Nominated	
2008	Best Newcomer	Nico Mirallegro (Newt)	Nominated	
2008	Best On-Screen Partnership	Matt Littler and Darren Jeffries (Max Cunningham & Sam "O.B." O'Brien)	Nominated	
2008	Best On-Screen Partnership	James Sutton and Guy Burnet (John Paul McQueen & Craig Dean)	Nominated	
2008	Best Single Episode	O.B. saves Max from the lake	Nominated	
2008	Best Single Episode	Craig's departure	Nominated	
2008	Best Soap	Hollyoaks	Nominated	
2008	Most Popular Actor	James Sutton (John Paul McQueen)	Won	
2008	Most Popular Actor	Chris Fountain (Justin Burton)	Nominated	
2008	Most Popular Actress	Gemma Bissix (Clare Cunningham)	Nominated	
2008	Most Popular Actress	Emma Rigby (Hannah Ashworth)	Nominated	
2008	Sexiest Female	Roxanne McKee (Louise Summers)	Won	
2008	Sexiest Female	Jennifer Metcalfe (Mercedes McQueen)	Nominated	
2008	Sexiest Male	James Sutton (John Paul McQueen)	Nominated	
2008	Sexiest Male	Calvin Valentine (Ricky Whittle)	Nominated	
2008	Storyline of the Year	Hannah's anorexia	Nominated	
2008	Storyline of the Year	John Paul and Craig's affair	Won	
2008	Villain of the Year	Gemma Bissix (Clare Cunningham)	Nominated	
2008	Villain of the Year	Jamie Lomas (Warren Fox)	Nominated	
2009	Soap of the Year	Hollyoaks	Nominated	
2013	Best Soap	Hollyoaks	Won	
2014	Best Female Soap Actor	Nikki Sanderson (Maxine Minniver)	Nominated	
2014	Best Male Soap Actor	James Sutton (John Paul McQueen)	Nominated	
2014	Best Male Soap Actor	Kieron Richardson (Ste Hay)	Nominated	
2014	Best Soap Newcomer	Cameron Moore (Cameron Campbell)	Nominated	
2014	Best Soap Newcomer	Twinnie Lee Moore (Porsche McQueen)	Nominated	
2014	Best Soap	Hollyoaks	Nominated	
2014	Best Soap Storyline	John Paul's rape ordeal	Nominated	
2014	Best Soap Storyline	Maxine and Patrick's domestic abuse	Nominated	
2016	Best Actor	Kieron Richardson (Ste Hay)	Won	
2016	Best Actress	Anna Passey (Sienna Blake)	Nominated	
2016	Best Newcomer	Gregory Finnegan (James Nightingale)	Nominated	
2016	Best Ship	Kieron Richardson & Parry Glasspool (Ste Hay & Harry Thompson)	Won	
2016	Best Soap	Hollyoaks	Nominated	
2016	Best Storyline	Jade and Alfie's cancer	Nominated	
2016	Biggest OMG Moment	Silas kills Lindsey	Nominated	
2016	Biggest Unsung Hero	Annie Wallace (Sally St. Claire)	Nominated	
2016	Funniest Character	Ross Adams (Scott Drinkwell)	Nominated	
2018	Best Soap (Evening)	Hollyoaks	2nd	
2018	Best Soap Actor (Female)	Nadine Mulkerrin (Cleo McQueen)	3rd	
2018	Best Soap Actor (Female)	Alex Fletcher (Diane Hutchinson)	10th	
2018	Best Soap Actor (Male)	Gregory Finnegan (James Nightingale)	2nd	
2018	Best Soap Actor (Male)	Aedan Duckworth (Ollie Morgan)	4th	
2018	Best Soap Storyline	Ollie Morgan's abuse	2nd	
2018	Best Soap Storyline	Cleo McQueen's bulimia	7th	
2018	Best Soap Couple	Prince McQueen (Malique Thompson-Dwyer) and Lily McQueen (Lauren McQueen)	3rd	
2018	Best Soap Couple	Harry Thompson (Parry Glasspool) and James Nightingale (Gregory Finnegan)	5th	
2018	Biggest OMG Soap moment	Nico Blake (Persephone Swales-Dawson) is not dead	6th	
2018	Biggest OMG Soap moment	Russ Owen's (Stuart Manning) death/Breda McQueen (Moya Brady) is a serial killer	Won	
2018	Most devastating Soap Death	Dirk Savage (David Kennedy)	5th	
2018	Most devastating Soap Death	Tegan Lomax (Jessica Ellis)	4th	
2018	Most Bizarre Soap Storyline	Rick Astley's cameo	4th	
2018	Most Bizarre Soap Storyline	Sami Maalik (Rishi Nair) and Kyle Kelly (Adam Rickitt) frame James Nightingale (Gregory Finnegan) for murder	5th	
2018	Best Soap Newcomer	Owen Warner (Romeo Quinn)	Won	
2018	Best Soap Newcomer	Tylan Grant (Brooke Hathaway)	8th	
2018	Best Soap Stunt	"Storm week"	Won	
2018	Best Soap Stunt	"The tunnel crash"	6th	
2019	Best Evening Soap	Hollyoaks	Won	
2019	Best Soap Actor (Female)	Stephanie Davis (Sinead O'Connor)	Won	
2019	Best Soap Actor (Female)	Harvey Virdi (Misbah Maalik)	3rd	
2019	Best Soap Actor (Male)	Kieron Richardson (Ste Hay)	Won	
2019	Best Soap Actor (Male)	Gregory Finnegan (James Nightingale)	2nd	
2019	Most Devastating Soap Death	Lily McQueen (Lauren McQueen)	Won	
2019	Most Devastating Soap Death	Harry Thompson (Parry Glasspool)	3rd	
2019	Best Soap Storyline	Ste's (Kieron Richardson) radicalisation	Won	
2019	Best Soap Couple	James Nightingale (Gregory Finnegan) and Harry Thompson (Parry Glasspool)	Won	
2019	Best Soap Couple	Scott Drinkwell (Ross Adams) and Mitchell Deveraux (Imran Adams)	4th	
2019	OMG Soap Moment	Breda (Moya Brady) kills Harry (Parry Glasspool)	Won	
2019	Best Soap Newcomer	Imran Adams (Mitchell Deveraux)	Won	
2020	Best Evening Soap	Hollyoaks	Longlisted	
2020	Best Storyline	Kyle's (Adam Rickitt) suicide	3rd	
2020	OMG Moment	Silas (Jeff Rawle) returns	3rd	

== Inside Soap Awards ==
The Inside Soap Awards are held by Inside Soap magazine every year and voted for by readers.

Year	Category	Recipients	Result	Ref(s)
1999	Best Actor	Paul Danan (Sol Patrick)	Nominated	
1999	Best Actress	Kerrie Taylor (Lucy Benson)	Nominated	
1999	Best Bad Guy/Girl	Rob Hawthorne	Nominated	
1999	Best British Soap	Hollyoaks	Nominated	
1999	Best Couple	Lewis Richardson and Ruth Benson	Nominated	
1999	Best Newcomer	James McKenzie-Robinson (Joe Johnson)	Nominated	
1999	Funniest Character	Carol Groves	Nominated	
1999	Most Dramatic Storyline	Kurt and Kate's affair	Nominated	
1999	Most Missed Character	Kurt Benson	Nominated	
1999	Sexiest Female	Kate Symms	Nominated	
1999	Sexiest Male	James Redmond	Nominated	
2001	Best Actor	Ben Hull (Lewis Richardson)	Nominated	
2001	Best Actress	Stephanie Waring (Cindy Cunningham)	Nominated	
2001	Best Bad Boy	Ben Hull (Lewis Richardson)	Nominated	
2001	Best Bitch	Joanna Taylor (Geri Hudson)	Nominated	
2001	Best British Soap	Hollyoaks	Nominated	
2001	Best Couple	Marcus Patric and Sarah Jayne Dunn (Ben Davies and Mandy Richardson)	Nominated	
2001	Best Exit	Sol Patrick	Nominated	
2001	Best Newcomer	Marcus Patric (Ben Davies)	Nominated	
2001	Funniest Character	Matt Littler (Max Cunningham)	Nominated	
2001	Most Dramatic Storyline	The trial of Luke's rapist	Nominated	
2001	Sexiest Female	Joanna Taylor	Nominated	
2001	Sexiest Male	James Redmond (Rory "Finn" Finnigan)	Nominated	
2002	Best Actor	Ben Hull (Lewis Richardson)	Nominated	
2002	Best Actress	Gemma Atkinson (Lisa Hunter)	Nominated	
2002	Best Bad Boy	Daniel Hyde (Scott Anderson)	Nominated	
2002	Best Bitch	Sarah Baxendale (Ellie Hunter)	Nominated	
2002	Best Couple	Bernard Latham and Kathryn George (Gordon and Helen Cunningham)	Nominated	
2002	Best Newcomer	Stefan Booth (Jamie Nash)	Nominated	
2002	Best Soap	Hollyoaks	Nominated	
2002	Best Storyline	Lisa's self-harming	Nominated	
2002	Funniest Character	Lee Otway (Bombhead)	Nominated	
2002	Sexiest Female	Elize du Toit (Izzy Davies)	Nominated	
2002	Sexiest Male	Martino Lazzeri	Nominated	
2003	Best Actor	Marcus Patric (Ben Davies)	Nominated	
2003	Best Actress	Sarah Dunn (Mandy Richardson)	Nominated	
2003	Best Bad Boy	Toby Mills	Nominated	
2003	Best Bitch	Steph Dean	Nominated	
2003	Best Couple	Chloe Bruce and Matt Musgrove	Nominated	
2003	Best Family	The Deans	Nominated	
2003	Best Newcomer	Jodi Albert (Debbie Dean)	Nominated	
2003	Best Soap	Hollyoaks	Nominated	
2003	Best Storyline	The serial killer mystery	Nominated	
2003	Funniest Character	Bombhead	Nominated	
2003	Sexiest Female	Elize du Toit (Izzy Davies)	Nominated	
2003	Sexiest Male	Henry Luxemburg (Toby Mills)	Nominated	
2004	Best Actor	Andrew McNair (Dan Hunter)	Nominated	
2004	Best Actress	Sarah Jayne Dunn (Mandy Richardson)	Nominated	
2004	Best Bad Boy	Daniel Hyde (Scott Anderson)	Nominated	
2004	Best Bitch	Sarah Baxendale (Ellie Mills)	Nominated	
2004	Best Couple	Kevin Sacre and Ali Bastian (Jake Dean and Becca Hayton)	Nominated	
2004	Best Newcomer	Matt Milburn (Joe Spencer)	Nominated	
2004	Best Soap	Hollyoaks	Nominated	
2004	Best Storyline	The aftermath of the deaths of Mr and Mrs Cunningham	Nominated	
2004	Best Storyline	Toby's death and Dan's trial for his murder	Nominated	
2004	Best Young Actor	Ellis Hollins (Tom Cunningham)	Nominated	
2004	Funniest Performance	Lee Otway (Bombhead)	Nominated	
2004	Sexiest Female	Ali Bastian (Becca Hayton)	Nominated	
2004	Sexiest Male	Marcus Patric (Ben Davies)	Nominated	
2008	Best Young Actor	Ellis Hollins (Tom Cunningham)	Won	
2011	Best Actor	Emmett J. Scanlan (Brendan Brady)	Nominated	
2011	Best Actress	Claire Cooper (Jacqui McQueen)	Nominated	
2011	Best Dramatic Performance	Kieron Richardson (Ste Hay)	Nominated	
2011	Best Exit	Carley Stenson (Steph Cunningham)	Nominated	
2011	Best Newcomer	Emmett J. Scanlan (Brendan Brady)	Won	
2011	Best Soap	Hollyoaks	Nominated	
2011	Best Wedding	Anthony Quinlan and Carley Stenson (Gilly and Steph Roach)	Nominated	
2011	Best Young Actor	Ellis Hollins (Tom Cunningham)	Nominated	
2011	Funniest Performance	Bronagh Waugh (Cheryl Brady)	Nominated	
2011	Sexiest Female	Jennifer Metcalfe (Mercedes McQueen)	Nominated	
2011	Sexiest Male	Danny Mac (Dodger Savage)	Won	
2012	Best Actor	Emmett J. Scanlan (Brendan Brady)	Won	
2012	Best Actress	Karen Hassan (Lynsey Nolan)	Nominated	
2012	Best Bad Boy	Emmett J. Scanlan (Brendan Brady)	Won	
2012	Best Bitch	Jennifer Metcalfe (Mercedes McQueen)	Nominated	
2012	Best-Dressed Soap Star	Jorgie Porter (Theresa McQueen)	Nominated	
2012	Best Newcomer	Steven Roberts (George Smith)	Nominated	
2012	Best Soap	Hollyoaks	Nominated	
2012	Best Young Actor	Ellis Hollins (Tom Cunningham)	Nominated	
2012	Sexiest Female	Rachel Shenton (Mitzeee Minniver)	Nominated	
2012	Sexiest Male	Danny Mac (Dodger Savage)	Nominated	
2012	Funniest Female	Nicole Barber-Lane (Myra McQueen)	Nominated	
2012	Funniest Male	Joe Tracini (Dennis Savage)	Nominated	
2013	Best Bad Boy	Joseph Thompson (Dr. Paul Browning)	Nominated	
2013	Best Bitch	Anna Passey (Sienna Blake)	Nominated	
2013	Best Soap	Hollyoaks	Nominated	
2013	Best Storyline	Sienna plots to steal Nancy's life	Nominated	
2013	Best Young Actor	Ellis Hollins (Tom Cunningham)	Nominated	
2013	Funniest Female	Nicole Barber-Lane (Myra McQueen)	Nominated	
2013	Funniest Male	Joe Tracini (Dennis Savage)	Nominated	
2013	Sexiest Female	Jennifer Metcalfe (Mercedes McQueen)	Nominated	
2013	Sexiest Male	Danny Mac (Dodger Savage)	Won	
2014	Best Soap	Hollyoaks	Nominated	
2014	Best Actor	Kieron Richardson (Ste Hay)	Nominated	
2014	Best Actress	Nikki Sanderson (Maxine Minniver)	Won	
2014	Best Bad Boy	Jeremy Sheffield (Patrick Blake)	Nominated	
2014	Best Bitch	Anna Passey (Sienna Blake)	Nominated	
2014	Best Bitch	Tamara Wall (Grace Black)	Nominated	
2014	Best Family	The McQueens	Nominated	
2014	Best Newcomer	Kirsty-Leigh Porter (Leela Lomax)	Nominated	
2014	Best Storyline	Maxine and Patrick's domestic abuse	Won	
2014	Best Young Actor	Ruby O'Donnell (Peri Lomax)	Nominated	
2014	Funniest Female	Diane Langton (Nana McQueen)	Nominated	
2014	Funniest Male	Joe Tracini (Dennis Savage)	Nominated	
2014	Sexiest Female	Jennifer Metcalfe (Mercedes McQueen)	Nominated	
2014	Sexiest Male	Danny Mac (Dodger Savage)	Won	
2015	Best Soap	Hollyoaks	Nominated	
2015	Best Actress	Nikki Sanderson (Maxine Minniver)	Nominated	
2015	Best Affair	Nick Pickard and Stephanie Davis (Tony Hutchinson and Sinead O'Connor)	Nominated	
2015	Best Bad Boy	Greg Wood (Trevor Royle)	Nominated	
2015	Best Bad Girl	Anna Passey (Sienna Blake)	Nominated	
2015	Best Bad Girl	Tamara Wall (Grace Black)	Nominated	
2015	Best Newcomer	Twinnie Lee Moore (Porsche McQueen)	Nominated	
2015	Best Partnership	Greg Wood and Tamara Wall (Trevor Royle and Grace Black)	Nominated	
2015	Best Show-Stopper	The Train Crash	Nominated	
2015	Best Young Actor	Ruby O'Donnell (Peri Lomax)	Nominated	
2015	Funniest Female	Jorgie Porter (Theresa McQueen)	Nominated	
2015	Funniest Male	Fabrizio Santino (Ziggy Roscoe)	Nominated	
2015	Sexiest Female	Jennifer Metcalfe (Mercedes McQueen)	Won	
2015	Sexiest Male	Ashley Taylor Dawson (Darren Osborne)	Nominated	
2016	Best Soap	Hollyoaks	Nominated	
2016	Best Bad Boy	Greg Wood (Trevor Royle)	Nominated	
2016	Best Bad Girl	Persephone Swales-Dawson (Nico Blake)	Won	
2016	Best Exit	Greg Wood (Trevor Royle)	Nominated	
2016	Best Newcomer	Richard Linnell (Alfie Nightingale)	Nominated	
2016	Best Shock Twist	Trevor is murdered by Nico	Nominated	
2016	Best Show-Stopper	Roscoes in the river	Nominated	
2016	Best Young Actor	Ruby O'Donnell (Peri Lomax)	Nominated	
2016	Funniest Female	Nicole Barber-Lane (Myra McQueen)	Nominated	
2016	Sexiest Female	Jennifer Metcalfe (Mercedes McQueen)	Nominated	
2016	Sexiest Male	Charlie Clapham (Freddie Roscoe)	Won	
2017	Best Soap	Hollyoaks	Nominated	
2017	Best Bad Boy	Jamie Lomas (Warren Fox)	Nominated	
2017	Best Bad Girl	Tamara Wall (Grace Black)	Nominated	
2017	Funnest Male	Ashley Taylor Dawson (Darren Osborne)	Nominated	
2017	Funniest Female	Nicole Barber-Lane (Myra McQueen)	Nominated	
2017	Best Young Actor	Ela-May Demircan (Leah Barnes)	Nominated	
2017	Sexiest Female	Jennifer Metcalfe (Mercedes McQueen)	Nominated	
2017	Best Partnership	Lysette Anthony (Marnie Nightingale) and Nicole Barber-Lane (Myra McQueen)	Nominated	
2017	Best Show-Stopper	Jade's (Kassius Nelson) death	Nominated	
2017	Best Shock Twist	Nathan's (Jared Garfield) death	Nominated	
2017	Best Exit	Kassius Nelson (Jade Albright)	Nominated	
2018	Best Soap	Hollyoaks	Nominated	
2018	Best Actor	Gregory Finnegan (James Nightingale)	Nominated	
2018	Best Bad Girl	Tamara Wall (Grace Black)	Nominated	
2018	Funniest Female	Nicole Barber-Lane (Myra McQueen)	Nominated	
2018	Best Newcomer	Rishi Nair (Sami Maalik)	Nominated	
2018	Best Young Actor	Aedan Duckworth (Oliver Morgan)	Nominated	
2018	Best Partnership	Jacob Roberts and Adam Woodward (Damon Kinsella and Brody Hudson)	Nominated	
2018	Best Show-Stopper	High school explosion / Neeta (Amrit Maghera) dies	Nominated	
2018	Best Shock Twist	Nico's (Persephone Swales-Dawson) alive / Sienna (Anna Passey) kills Nico	Nominated	
2019	Best Soap	Hollyoaks	Won	
2019	Best Actor	Adam Woodward (Brody Hudson)	Won	
2019	Best Actress	Stephanie Davis (Sinead Shelby)	Won	
2019	Best Bad Boy	Kyle Pryor (Laurie Shelby)	Nominated	
2019	Best Bad Girl	Jennifer Metcalfe (Mercedes McQueen)	Nominated	
2019	Funniest Male	Ashley Taylor Dawson (Darren Osborne)	Nominated	
2019	Best Newcomer	Niamh Blackshaw (Juliet Nightingale)	Nominated	
2019	Best Young Actor	Aedan Duckworth (Oliver Morgan)	Nominated	
2019	Best Shock Twist	Breda (Moya Brady) is a serial killer!	Nominated	
2019	Best Exit	Lauren McQueen (Lily McQueen)	Nominated	
2020	Best Soap	Hollyoaks	Nominated	
2020	Best Actor	Ashley Taylor Dawson (Darren Osborne)	Nominated	
2020	Best Actress	Jennifer Metcalfe (Mercedes McQueen)	Nominated	
2020	Best Newcomer	Callum Kerr (George Kiss)	Nominated	
2020	Best Partnership	Imran Adams (Mitchell Deveraux) and Ross Adams (Scott Drinkwell)	Nominated	
2020	Best Family	The McQueens	Nominated	
2020	Best Villain	Bobby Gordon (Toby Faroe)	Nominated	
2020	Funniest Performance	Jessamy Stoddart (Liberty Savage)	Nominated	
2020	Feel-Good Moment	Sienna (Anna Passey) gets her babies back	Nominated	
2020	Best Show-Stopper	Tony's (Nick Pickard) rescue and Breda's (Moya Brady) death	Nominated	
2021	Best Actress	Kéllé Bryan (Martine Deveraux)	Nominated	
2021	Best Actress	Alex Fletcher (Diane Hutchinson)	Nominated	
2021	Best Actress	Anna Passey (Sienna Blake)	Nominated	
2021	Best Actor	Richard Blackwood (Felix Westwood)	Nominated	
2021	Best Actor	Gary Lucy (Luke Morgan)	Nominated	
2021	Best Actor	Billy Price (Sid Sumner)	Nominated	
2021	Best Family	The Deverauxs	Nominated	
2021	Best Family	The McQueens	Nominated	
2021	Best Newcomer	Robert Beck (Fergus Collins)	Nominated	
2021	Best Newcomer	Rhiannon Clements (Summer Ranger)	Nominated	
2021	Best Newcomer	Ki Griffin (Ripley Lennox)	Nominated	
2021	Best Partnership	Richard Blackwood and Kéllé Bryan (Felix Westwood and Martine Deveraux)	Nominated	
2021	Best Partnership	Rhiannon Clements and Anna Passey (Summer Ranger and Sienna Blake)	Nominated	
2021	Best Show-Stopper	Flash-forward conclusion/Ella stabs Jordan	Nominated	
2021	Best Show-Stopper	Sid's 'death' and return	Nominated	
2021	Best Soap	Hollyoaks	Nominated	
2021	Feel-Good Moment	Brooke tells their friends they identify as non-binary	Nominated	
2021	Feel-Good Moment	Tom and Yazz's wedding	Nominated	
2021	Funniest Performance	Chelsee Healey (Goldie McQueen)	Nominated	
2021	Funniest Performance	Jorgie Porter (Theresa McQueen)	Nominated	
2022	Best Actress	Jennifer Metcalfe (Mercedes McQueen)	Nominated	
2022	Best Actress	Harvey Virdi (Misbah Maalik)	Nominated	
2022	Best Actress	Stephanie Waring (Cindy Cunningham)	Nominated	
2022	Best Actor	Richard Blackwood (Felix Westwood)	Nominated	
2022	Best Actor	Gregory Finnegan (James Nightingale)	Nominated	
2022	Best Actor	James Sutton (John Paul McQueen)	Nominated	
2022	Best Comic Performance	Chelsee Healey (Goldie McQueen)	Nominated	
2022	Best Comic Performance	Jessamy Stoddart (Liberty Savage)	Nominated	
2022	Best Double Act	Anna Passey and Kieron Richardson (Sienna Blake and Ste Hay)	Won	
2022	Best Double Act	Ijaz Rana and Nick Pickard (Imran Maalik and Tony Hutchinson)	Nominated	
2022	Best Family	The Chen-Williams	Nominated	
2022	Best Family	The McQueens	Nominated	
2022	Best Newcomer	Garcia Brown (Zoe Anderson)	Nominated	
2022	Best Newcomer	Matthew James-Bailey (Ethan Williams)	Nominated	
2022	Best Romance	Haiesha Mistry and Ellis Hollins (Yasmine and Tom Cunningham)	Nominated	
2022	Best Romance	Jessica Fox and Ashley Taylor Dawson (Nancy and Darren Osborne)	Nominated	
2022	Best Show-Stopper	Explosion at the Salon de Thé	Nominated	
2022	Best Show-Stopper	Luke's death in Mallorca	Nominated	
2022	Best Soap	Hollyoaks	Nominated	
2022	Best Storyline	John Paul's alcohol addiction	Nominated	
2022	Best Storyline	Misbah's historic rape	Nominated	
2022	Best Villain	Glynis Barber (Norma Crow)	Nominated	
2022	Best Villain	Jamie Lomas (Warren Fox)	Nominated	
2022	Best Young Performer	Charlie Behan (Charlie Dean)	Nominated	
2022	Best Young Performer	Jayden Fox (Bobby Costello)	Nominated	
2023	Best Actress	Lucy-Jo Hudson (Donna-Marie Quinn)	Nominated	
2023	Best Actress	Jennifer Metcalfe (Mercedes McQueen)	Nominated	
2023	Best Actress	Nikki Sanderson (Maxine Minniver)	Nominated	
2023	Best Actor	Richard Blackwood (Felix Westwood)	Nominated	
2023	Best Actor	Gregory Finnegan (James Nightingale)	Nominated	
2023	Best Actor	Jamie Lomas (Warren Fox)	Nominated	
2023	Best Comic Performance	Chelsee Healey (Goldie McQueen)	Nominated	
2023	Best Comic Performance	Diane Langton (Nana McQueen)	Nominated	
2023	Best Family	The Maaliks	Nominated	
2023	Best Family	The McQueens	Nominated	
2023	Best Newcomer	Jemma Donovan (Rayne Royce)	Nominated	
2023	Best Newcomer	Jon-Paul Bell (Beau Ramsey)	Nominated	
2023	Best Partnership	Anna Passey and Matthew James Bailey (Sienna Blake and Ethan Williams)	Nominated	
2023	Best Partnership	Niamh Blackshaw and Ruby O'Donnell (Juliet Nightingale and Peri Lomax)	Nominated	
2023	Best Showstopper	Maxine's long walk home	Nominated	
2023	Best Showstopper	Silas' revenge/carnival horror	Nominated	
2023	Best Soap	Hollyoaks	Nominated	
2023	Best Storyline	Incel Eric targets Maxine & Mason	Nominated	
2023	Best Storyline	Juliet's cancer battle	Nominated	
2023	Best Villain	Glynis Barber (Norma Crow)	Nominated	
2023	Best Villain	Angus Castle-Doughty (Eric Foster)	Nominated	
2023	Best Young Performer	Ela-May Demircan (Leah Barnes)	Nominated	
2023	Best Young Performer	Jayden Fox (Bobby Costello)	Nominated	
2023	Outstanding Achievement	Nikki Sanderson (Maxine Minniver)	Won	
2024	Best Actress	Anna Passey (Sienna Blake)	Nominated	
2024	Best Actress	Kirsty-Leigh Porter (Leela Dexter)	Nominated	
2024	Best Actress	Nadine Mulkerrin (Cleo McQueen)	Nominated	
2024	Best Actor	Charlie Clapham (Freddie Roscoe)	Nominated	
2024	Best Actor	James Sutton (John Paul McQueen)	Nominated	
2024	Best Actor	Kieron Richardson (Ste Hay)	Nominated	
2024	Best Comic Performance	Jessamy Stoddart (Liberty Savage)	Nominated	
2024	Best Comic Performance	Jorgie Porter (Theresa McQueen)	Nominated	
2024	Best Family	The McQueens	Nominated	
2024	Best Family	The Osbornes	Nominated	
2024	Best Newcomer	Isabelle Smith (Frankie Osborne)	Won	
2024	Best Newcomer	Iz Hesketh (Kitty Draper)	Nominated	
2024	Best Partnership	Kirsty-Leigh Porter and Rory Douglas-Speed (Leela and Joel Dexter)	Nominated	
2024	Best Partnership	Oscar Curtis and Nathaniel Dass (Lucas Hay and Dillon Ray)	Nominated	
2024	Best Showstopper	Car crash carnage	Nominated	
2024	Best Showstopper	Frankie is being abused by JJ	Nominated	
2024	Best Soap	Hollyoaks	Nominated	
2024	Best Storyline	Sibling sexual abuse	Nominated	
2024	Best Storyline	Leela and Joel's baby loss	Nominated	
2024	Best Villain	Jamie Lomas (Warren Fox)	Nominated	
2024	Best Villain	Tyler Conti (Abe Fielding)	Nominated	
2024	Best Young Performer	Ava Webster (Ro Hutchinson)	Nominated	
2024	Best Young Performer	Oscar Curtis (Lucas Hay)	Nominated	

== National Television Awards ==
Year	Category	Recipients	Result	Ref(s)
1997	Most Popular Children's Programme	Hollyoaks	Nominated	
2003	Most Popular Serial Drama	Hollyoaks	Nominated	
2004	Most Popular Serial Drama	Hollyoaks	Nominated	
2005	Most Popular Serial Drama	Hollyoaks	Nominated	
2006	Most Popular Actor	Chris Fountain (Justin Burton)	Nominated	
2006	Most Popular Newcomer	Andrew Moss (Rhys Ashworth)	Nominated	
2006	Most Popular Serial Drama	Hollyoaks	Nominated	
2007	Most Popular Actor	James Sutton (John Paul McQueen)	Nominated	
2007	Most Popular Newcomer	Gemma Merna (Carmel McQueen)	Nominated	
2007	Most Popular Serial Drama	Hollyoaks	Nominated	
2008	Most Popular Newcomer	Barry Sloane (Niall Rafferty)	Nominated	
2008	Most Popular Serial Drama	Hollyoaks	Nominated	
2008	Outstanding Serial Drama Performance	Matt Littler (Max Cunningham)	Won	
2010	Most Popular Newcomer	Bronagh Waugh (Cheryl Brady)	Nominated	
2010	Most Popular Serial Drama	Hollyoaks	Nominated	
2011	Most Popular Serial Drama	Hollyoaks	Nominated	
2012	Most Popular Serial Drama	Hollyoaks	Nominated	
2013	Most Popular Newcomer	Joseph Thompson (Dr. Paul Browning)	Nominated	
2013	Most Popular Serial Drama	Hollyoaks	Nominated	
2013	Outstanding Serial Drama Performance	Emmett J. Scanlan (Brendan Brady)	Nominated	
2014	Most Popular Newcomer	Anna Passey (Sienna Blake)	Nominated	
2014	Most Popular Serial Drama	Hollyoaks	Nominated	
2015	Most Popular Newcomer	Cameron Moore (Cameron Campbell)	Nominated	
2015	Most Popular Serial Drama	Hollyoaks	Nominated	
2015	Serial Drama Performance	Nikki Sanderson (Maxine Minniver)	Nominated	
2016	Most Popular Newcomer	Parry Glasspool (Harry Thompson)	Nominated	
2016	Most Popular Serial Drama	Hollyoaks	Nominated	
2017	Most Popular Newcomer	Duncan James (Ryan Knight)	Nominated	
2017	Most Popular Serial Drama	Hollyoaks	Nominated	
2018	Newcomer	Nathan Morris (Milo Entwistle)	Nominated	
2018	Serial Drama	Hollyoaks	Nominated	
2019	Serial Drama	Hollyoaks	Nominated	
2019	Newcomer	Aedan Duckworth (Oliver Morgan)	Nominated	
2020	Serial Drama	Hollyoaks	Nominated	
2020	Serial Drama Performance	Gregory Finnegan (James Nightingale)	Nominated	
2020	Newcomer	Imran Adams (Mitchell Deveraux)	Nominated	
2021	Serial Drama	Hollyoaks	Nominated	
2021	Newcomer	Rhiannon Clements (Summer Ranger)	Nominated	
2021	Serial Drama Performance	Richard Blackwood (Felix Westwood)	Longlisted	
2021	Serial Drama Performance	Kéllé Bryan (Martine Deveraux)	Longlisted	
2021	Serial Drama Performance	Jamie Lomas (Warren Fox)	Longlisted	
2021	Serial Drama Performance	Jennifer Metcalfe (Mercedes McQueen)	Longlisted	
2021	Serial Drama Performance	Anna Passey (Sienna Blake)	Longlisted	
2021	Serial Drama Performance	Billy Price (Sid Sumner)	Nominated	

== The National Film Awards UK ==
Year	Category	Recipients	Result	Ref(s)
2023	Best Actor in a TV Series	Richard Blackwood	Won	
2023	Best Actress in a TV Series	Jennifer Metcalfe	Won	
2024	Best Actor in a TV Series	Jamie Lomas	Won	

== Royal Television Society Awards ==
The Royal Television Society Awards is an annual ceremony hosted by the educational charity Royal Television Society to acknowledge achievements in broadcasting.

Year	Category	Recipients	Result	Ref(s)
2002	Soap	Hollyoaks	Nominated	
2013	Soap and Continuing Drama	Hollyoaks	Nominated	
2017	Soap and Continuing Drama	Hollyoaks	Nominated	
2019	Soap and Continuing Drama	Hollyoaks	Won	
2022	Soap and Continuing Drama	Hollyoaks	Won	

== Stonewall Awards ==
The Stonewall Awards were held by the LGBT rights charity Stonewall from 2006 until 2015.

Year	Category	Recipients	Result	Ref(s)
2007	Broadcast of the Year	Hollyoaks	Won	
2015	Broadcast of the Decade	Hollyoaks	Won	

== TRIC Awards ==
The TRIC Awards are presented by the Television and Radio Industries Club.

Year	Category	Recipients	Result	Ref(s)
2003	TV Soap of the Year	Hollyoaks	Nominated	
2007	TV Soap of the Year	Hollyoaks	Nominated	
2009	TV Soap of the Year	Hollyoaks	Nominated	
2010	TV Soap Personality	Ricky Whittle (Calvin Valentine)	Won	
2010	TV Soap of the Year	Hollyoaks	Nominated	
2011	TV Soap of the Year	Hollyoaks	Nominated	
2011	TV Soap Personality	Jennifer Metcalfe (Mercedes McQueen)	Nominated	
2013	Soap Personality	Nick Pickard (Tony Hutchinson)	Nominated	
2013	TV Soap of the Year	Hollyoaks	Nominated	
2014	Soap Personality	Ashley Taylor Dawson (Darren Osborne)	Won	
2015	TV Soap of the Year	Hollyoaks	Nominated	
2020	Soap of the Year	Hollyoaks	Nominated	
2020	Soap Actor of the Year	Jennifer Metcalfe (Mercedes McQueen)	Nominated	
2021	Soap of the Year	Hollyoaks	Longlisted	
2021	Soap Actor of the Year	Kéllé Bryan (Martine Deveraux)	Longlisted	
2021	Soap Actor of the Year	Nick Pickard (Tony Hutchinson)	Longlisted	
2021	Soap Actor of the Year	Jessica Fox (Nancy Hayton)	Longlisted	
2021	Soap Actor of the Year	Richard Blackwood (Felix Westwood)	Longlisted	
2022	Soap of the Year	Hollyoaks	Longlisted	
2022	Soap Actor	Jennifer Metcalfe (Mercedes McQueen)	Longlisted	
2022	Soap Actor	Jamie Lomas (Warren Fox)	Longlisted	
2022	Soap Actor	Harvey Virdi (Dr Misbah Maalik)	Longlisted	
2022	Soap Actor	Richard Blackwood (Felix Westwood)	Longlisted	
2023	Soap of the Year	Hollyoaks	Longlisted	
2023	Soap Actor	Jennifer Metcalfe (Mercedes McQueen)	Longlisted	
2023	Soap Actor	Richard Blackwood (Felix Westwood)	Longlisted	

== TV Quick Awards ==
The TV Quick Awards were presented by the British magazine TV Quick.

Year	Category	Recipients	Result	Ref(s)
2001	Best Soap	Hollyoaks	Nominated	
2001	Best New Actor/Actress	Elize du Toit (Izzy Cornwell)	Nominated	
2001	Best New Actor/Actress	Marcus Patric (Ben Davies)	Nominated	
2001	Best Soap Actress	Terri Dwyer (Ruth Osborne)	Nominated	
2001	Best Soap Actress	Joanna Taylor (Geri Hudson)	Nominated	
2001	Best Soap Actor	Ben Hull (Lewis Richardson)	Nominated	
2001	Best Soap Actor	Gary Lucy (Luke Morgan)	Nominated	
2001	Best Soap Storyline	Jealousy and violence between Ruth and Lewis	Nominated	
2001	Best Soap Storyline	Luke's rape: the court case	Nominated	

== Writers' Guild of Great Britain Awards ==
The Writers' Guild of Great Britain Awards is an annual award ceremony ran by the Writers' Guild of Great Britain, celebrating the achievements of screenwriters.

Year	Category	Recipients	Result	Ref(s)
2012	Best Continuing TV Drama	Nick Leather for "Hollyoaks: A Little Film About Love"	Won	
2019	Best Long Running TV Series	Roanne Bardsley	Nominated	
2020	Best Long Running TV Series	Roanne Bardsley for Episode 5013	Won	

== Broadcast Digital Awards ==
Year	Category	Recipients	Result	Ref(s)
2022	Best Digital Support for a Programme	Hollyoaks	Won	
