= Kate Patrick =

UK soap opera character, created 1997

- Hollyoaks character
- Portrayed by: Natasha Symms
- Duration: 1997–2000
- First appearance: 27 November 1997
- Last appearance: 18 December 2000
- Introduced by: Jo Hallows
In-universe information
- Father: Pete Johnston
- Mother: Jill Patrick
- Stepfather: Jack Osborne
- Brothers: Joe Johnson; Sol Patrick (adoptive)
- Sisters: Gina Patrick (adoptive)

Kate Patrick is a fictional character from the British soap opera Hollyoaks, played by Natasha Symms. She debuted on-screen during the episode broadcast on 6 November 1997. She departed in 1999 and returned for guest appearances in 2000.

== Casting ==
Dannielle Brent, who plays Symms' on-screen sister Gina Patrick originally auditioned for the role of Kate. During their time with the show, Symms and Brent lived together along with Paul Danan, who played their character's brother Sol Patrick.

== Development ==
Kate lived with her mother Jill Patrick (Lynda Rooke), sister and brother at The Dog in the Pond public house. She was billed as "bright, independent, superstitious."

The character became known for being a "predatory maneater". Symms explained "I'm a bit of a femme fatale, as they call it. I've managed to wreck about two marriages, one being the main married couple of the show. It's a brilliant character. She unfortunately gets rather obsessed with the married men and she goes a bit nutty." Symms said she was not at all similar to Kate in real life, but she enjoyed playing a character who was very different to herself. Symms received some verbal abuse from younger fans when her character came between Kurt Benson (Jeremy Edwards) and Ruth Osborne (Terri Dwyer). She thought she would receive hate mail because Kurt and Ruth were popular characters, but she actually received letters telling her Kurt and Kate were better suited.

== Storylines ==
When their mother Jill Patrick marries Jack Osborne (Jimmy McKenna), Kate along with her siblings Gina and Sol Patrick acquire step-siblings in the form of stuck-up Ruth (Terri Dwyer) and Darren Osborne (Ashley Taylor Dawson), who they refuse to get along with. Ruth's attitude towards her family riled Kate, and as revenge, she taught her a lesson she wouldn't forget by seducing and having an affair with her husband Kurt Benson, effectively destroying their marriage.

Kate earned a reputation in the village as the wicked step-sister, but she couldn't have cared less as she had serious family issues to contend with. Firstly, her mother admitted that Gina and Sol were not her biological children but had brought them up as her own when their real mother died. The biggest bombshell for Kate was that she had a long lost twin brother, Joe Johnson (James McKenzie Robinson), who she had never known. When Joe arrived in the village, Kate rejected him, but soon warmed up to him. Unfortunately, there was an attraction between them which they could not shake and they shared a kiss.

Ruth and Carol Groves (Natalie Casey) spread rumors that they were having an incestuous affair. Kate exacted revenge by stealing Carol's diary and photocopying pages and sticking them in the phone box for everyone to see. She then gave Ruth laxatives before her housewarming party, then hid all the toilet paper, and let all her friends and family in and left them to it. Joe's feelings for Kate grew stronger by the day, and realising that she couldn't cope with being so close to him anymore, Kate said a tearful goodbye to Jill, Gina, Sol and Jack before breaking the news to Joe that she was leaving. Kate later returned to help her brother Sol get back on his feet after being made homeless by Jack, and also for Jill's funeral.

== Reception ==
In 1999, Kate and Kurt's affair was nominated for "Most Dramatic Storyline" at the Inside Soap Awards. Merle Brown of the Daily Record said that The Patrick family became a mess and said Hollyoaks was "unmissable" when they all suffered an identity crisis. His colleague Vicky Spavin dubbed Kate "the Patrick family's most dysfunctional member." Following Kate's return in 2000, another reporter for the Daily Record called her a "bitch" and commented "Yes, Kate Patrick is back, and she's mixing it as much as she ever was." That same year, the character was included in a Coventry Evening Telegraph feature about soap characters "viewers love to hate".
