= Gina Patrick =

UK soap opera character, created 1997

- Hollyoaks character
- Portrayed by: Dannielle Brent
- Duration: 1997–2001
- First appearance: 20 November 1997
- Last appearance: 30 May 2001
- Introduced by: Jo Hallows
In-universe information
- Occupation: Student; Magazine editor Voluntary worker
- Adoptive mother: Jill Patrick
- Stepfather: Jack Osborne
- Brothers: Sol Patrick; Joe Johnson (adoptive)
- Sisters: Kate Patrick (adoptive)

Gina Patrick is a fictional character from the British soap opera Hollyoaks, played by Dannielle Brent. The character debuted on-screen during the episode broadcast on 20 November 1997. Brent secured the role after originally auditioning for the role of Gina's sister Kate Patrick. Gina was initially a recurring character, though was promoted later to the regular cast. Brent felt that the role had given her good training, though decided to leave the serial after four years.

Gina is characterised as a tomboy who prefers casual clothing and has strong views on environmental issues. The character has been at the centre of a lesbian relationship with fellow character Emily Taylor. Brent said she was not made aware of the storyline until later in her tenure. She praised the storyline because it portrayed lesbians in a natural relationship. The storyline had a positive effect on the programme itself when it increased viewing interest. The relationship was also well received by columnists of the Daily Record.

== Casting ==
Actress Danielle Brent secured the role in 1997. It was her first television role after she attended the Italia Conti Academy of Theatre Arts. Brent originally auditioned for the role of Kate Patrick, who Natasha Symms went on to play. Brent was originally signed to the serial on a recurring basis, though she was later promoted to the regular cast. Brent left the programme after four years of playing Gina. Brent said she had a great time in the serial and labelled the role as "the best training I could have wished for."

== Development ==
Gina was characterised as a "eco warrior". Her style of clothing was casual wear and hooded sweat shirts. Gina was originally described to Brent as being a tomboy who liked wearing combats. Gina also takes on "major roles" in college politics and is described as a "memorable" contributor to the serial's fictional magazine The Review. Gina is also portrayed as a moody teenager with facial piercings. Brent told Ellie Genower from Soaplife enjoyed not having to be "happy and chirpy" whilst filming Gina's scenes. Gina was portrayed differently to the rest of the show's other characters. Brent explained to Genower that Gina is unlike them because "she's got lip and nose rings, she's really not as glamorous. She's confidently moody and it's fun!" Gina's nose and lip rings are not real piercings and Brent clipped them on during filming. Unlike other females working on the show, Brent did not have to spend much time in the make-up department as Gina initially often opts not to wear make-up. Brent recalled "awful" instances that make-up artists added "bags to her eyes" to make Gina appear worse.

Gina was involved in a storyline in which she came out as a lesbian. She later begins a relationship with Emily Taylor (Lorna Pegler). Producers did not inform either actress about the storyline to begin with, however, told them they had "saucy" plans for their characters. Brent said she was "fine" with the storyline when she found out. Pegler said she was happy that the storyline showed there is nothing "unnatural" about same sex relationships. Brent said she played their relationship like any other, featuring "the laughs, the rows and so on." Brent and Pegler planned their characters first kiss two months in advance, in order to find out the best way to "tackle" the plot. Gina and Emily have completely different personalities, though they "share a passion for animal welfare." The storyline proved successful with viewers and increased general interest for Hollyoaks. Though some viewers became so involved with the storyline, they assumed Brent and Pegler were in a relationship outside of their characters. When Gina comes out to her family, her brother Sol Patrick (Paul Danan) does not take the news well. Danan said Sol is angry and hurt and "feels she has kept her sexuality a secret from him for years."

Writers created a kidnapping story for Gina in which she is taken hostage by Steve Holt (Conor Ryan). He is the brother of Jess Holt (Frankie Hough) and is a pimp. He sets fire to The Dog pub and attacks Gina's brother, Sol. He later becomes angry when Gina and Emily have been watching him and try to have him arrested. Brent told Susan Riley from Soaplife that "she's been a marked woman ever since he caught Gina and Emily spying on him, though she didn't know it." Steve starts stalking Gina and she becomes scared all the time. Brent added that Gina is "really paranoid", a "nervous wreck" and fails to recognise "how deep" the trouble is she is in with Steve. He waits until Gina is alone and kidnaps her, taking her to a disused barn. Gina's friends believe she is on a field trip and do not notice her disappearance. Gina spends days being held hostage at the barn and Brent revealed Gina believes she will die there. Steve taunts Gina, "he really gets a kick out of frightening her". Hough told Francesca Babb from All About Soap that Jess is "gutted" about what Steve has done to Gina. She added that Jess "just hates it when he hurts other people. If it's possible, the way he treats Gina makes Jess more scared of Steve." Brent revealed that Gina is a "tough cookie" and gains the will to fight against Steve. Gina gets "angry" and "it's really physical stuff" when she makes her escape. Steve chases Gina through a woodland area, catches her and takes her back to the barn. Brent revealed that the escape scenes were so physical that she hurt her neck during filming. Brent added that Gina is "strong enough to survive" the kidnapping ordeal but it would have a "lasting effect on her". Steve is arrested for kidnapping Gina but later breaks his bail conditions. He confronts Sol and Jess, he fights Sol and knocks him unconscious. Jess then pushes Steve down some stairs at The Loft night club and he falls off a balcony. Sol attempts to switch off Steve's life support, but Jess convinces him to leave Hollyoaks, which formed Danan's exit from the series.

Writers decided to further Gina's anguish by portraying Emily as unfaithful to her following her kidnapping by Steve. Gina discovers Emily kissing another woman when she reviews video footage from the night of Steve's accident. Gina notices Emily kissing in the background and confronts her. Brent told Karen Dunn from All About Soap that Gina feels "devastated" because aside from her step-father Jack Osborne (Jimmy McKenna), Gina was the only other character she could rely on. Brent believed that Emily cheated because "Gina has been so wrapped up in herself she's forgotten Emily's needs." Gina decides to forgive Emily and they try to make the relationship work. Emily later changes her mind and breaks-up with Gina because she is unable to cope with "the emotional pressure" Gina causes. She added that ultimately "Emily is fed up of Gina being miserable."

Gina attempts to move on from Emily by concentrating on a charity work project. Gina tries to fundraise for an orphanage in China but no one else "shares her enthusiasm". Brent explained that the failed project heightens Gina's woes and Gina also struggles with her college work. Jack becomes concerned and tells Gina that failing her studies would be letting her mother down. Brent added "it upsets Gina as she's fed up of people talking about Jill". She believed Gina is aware she will not pass her exams, which is why she concentrates on doing charity work. Writers also revisited Gina's kidnap storyline April 2001. Gina is given a letter about her the court case for Steve's trial. Brent believed Gina is "petrified" of seeing Steve again but knows she must give evidence to secure a guilty verdict. She added "only after Steve is locked up can she get on with her life".

== Storylines ==
Gina arrives in the village with her family Sol, Kate and Jill Patrick (Lynda Rooke). Gina soon establishes herself to be different from the rest of her family who are loud and brash. Gina takes a keen interest in environmental issues and flaunts facial piercings. She studies hard at Hollyoaks Community College and decides to get involved in college politics. She applies for a job as the editor of college magazine The Review, pitching against her friend Emily. Though Ruth Osborne (Terri Dwyer) manages to ruin her chances. Gina begins to act wayward and suffers with her identity. When she goes missing, Sol and Jill go in search for her and are involved in a car accident.

Gina fends off the advances of Paul Millington, not wanting to hurt him she lets him down gently. Gina then raises the issue of her sexuality, after she begins a relationship with Emily. When she comes out Sol is upset that she did not tell him sooner. Gina manages to secure a position with the magazine. Jill is later diagnosed with a brain tumour and later dies. This affects Gina's relationship with Emily. They begin to fight more and they cannot manage to be in each other's company. Emily has an affair and Gina ends their relationship when she finds out the truth. She moves back in with her step-father Jack. Gina then begins to fail at college and quits. She moves to China to work in an orphanage, wanting to make her mother proud of her.

== Reception ==
Brent was nominated for "Sexiest Female" at the 2001 British Soap Awards, for her portrayal. Merle Brown of the Daily Record has been critical of Gina. Initially enjoying her storylines, she grew tired of the character. She said that The Patrick family became a mess and said Hollyoaks was "unmissable" when Gina suffered an identity crisis. When Gina lost the college election because of her sexuality, Brown said that it was "not nice" but added that it was probably true. She later became annoyed that Gina and Emily began fighting. She branded the storyline as "nonsense" and questioned why they ever bothered to begin a relationship. She later said they "spend most of their life fighting" and jested that blokes would much prefer them to do it "naked in mud." By 2001, Brown could not stand to watch Gina any longer. She said she hoped she would leave with Sol or be murdered by pimp Steve. Vicky Spavin from Daily Record believed that Brent had "a great figure" but Gina's style does not "do her justice" because she is "all lip studs and scraped back hair".

In the book The media : an introduction, Adam Briggs and Paul Cobley said that by 2001 homosexual relationships in soap opera were no longer a novelty. They said Gina and Emily's relationship was a notable example. All About Soap's Karen Dunn opined that Gina "really hasn't had much luck of late. What with her mother dying of cancer, being kidnapped by the evil Steve, her brother Sol fleeing the country... and now the Hollyoaker has found out that Emily, her long-term girlfriend, has cheated on her." Soaplife's Genower assessed that Brent was different to the "piercings and moodiness" of Gina, noting that 1999 was a bad year for the character. She branded Gina a "temperamental teenager" who has had "more than her fair share of gloomy moments."
