= Jack Osborne =

Fictional character from Hollyoaks

- Hollyoaks character
- Portrayed by: Jimmy McKenna; Ben Ewing (2016 flashback)
- Duration: 1996–present
- First appearance: 18 November 1996
- Introduced by: Jo Hallows
- Spin-off appearances: Hollyoaks Later (2020)
- Crossover appearances: Brookside (2025)
In-universe information
- Occupation: Police officer Pub landlord Pub manager Barman
- Family: Osborne
- Mother: Aggie Osborne
- Brothers: Kenneth Osborne
- Half-brothers: Billy Brodie
- Wife: Celia Osborne (until 1997); Jill Patrick (1998–2000); Frankie Dean (2005–2017); Darcy Wilde (2018–2019)
- Sons: Darren Osborne
- Daughters: Ruth Osborne; Bethany Cunningham
- Adoptive sons: Tom Cunningham
- Stepsons: Craig Dean; Jake Dean; Toby Wilde
- Stepdaughters: Steph Dean; Debbie Dean
- Grandsons: JJ Osborne; Oscar Osborne; Maddox Keane (adoptive); Charlie Dean (adoptive)
- Granddaughters: Frankie Osborne; Morgan Osborne
- Nieces: Natalie Osborne; Rachel Osborne; Eva Falco

Jack Osborne is a fictional character from the British Channel 4 soap opera Hollyoaks, played by Jimmy McKenna. The character debuted on-screen during the episode broadcast on 18 November 1996 and is the second longest featured character in the show. He was introduced as part of the Osborne family, which also consisted of Jack's wife Celia (Carol Noakes) and their children Darren (Adam Booth/Ashley Taylor Dawson) and Ruth (Terri Dwyer). His storylines include an affair with Dawn Cunningham (Lisa Williamson), four marriages and faking his own death in an insurance scam. For numerous years, Jack's role in the show is the landlord of the pub, The Dog in the Pond. During Hollyoaks' 30th anniversary the show aired a special crossover with former soap Brookside, McKenna along with most of the then current Hollyoaks cast appeared in the episode.

== Casting ==
McKenna is the show's second longest serving cast member having appeared consecutively since 1996. A reporter from Daily Record wrote that Jack had been "drafted in to quicken the pace" of the soap. McKenna began filming after original cast member, Nick Pickard who plays Tony Hutchinson. In an interview for E4.com, Pickard stated that he joined the cast "in October and he [McKenna] came in at Christmas"; this equated to McKenna joining "about 20 or 30 episodes" later.

== Development ==
A writer from the official Hollyoaks website described Jack as "no nonsense but a good sport." Writers later created a relationship storyline between Jack and Frankie Dean (Helen Pearson). In 2007, the show's executive producer Bryan Kirkwood adored "I love Jack and Frankie – they're essentially the heart of the show".

In 2003, Jack becomes responsible for teenager Norman Sankofa (Jamie Luke), who moves into his flat as a lodger. Writers reintroduced Jack's son, Darren Osborne (Ashley Taylor Dawson), who then has to share a room with Norman. Dawson told Joanne Tebbutt All About Soap that Darren "hates" the situation and feels that Norman is preventing him from having Jack's full attention. Dawson believed that Darren "resents" Norman and begins feuding with him. Darren's behaviour causes Jack to react angrily towards Darren. Dawson revealed that Darren "uses emotional blackmail" against Jack which causes a confrontation. Darren stays out all night and worries Jack, which makes him reconsider and tries to bond with his son. Jack's attempts to be a better father are disastrous. Jack introduces Darren to his friends, but they tell Darren that previously believed Jack did not have a son. Dawson described Darren as "understandably upset" and "feels that once again his dad has let him down." Dawson believed that Darren secretly "wants to get on better with his dad" but is "really bitter" and "insecure". Darren ultimately feels that Jack has never allowed him to feel welcome where ever they have lived. Dawson added that Jack and Darren have "an interesting relationship" which meant they would "continue to clash".

The Osbornes suffered financial crisis when Darren's gambling addiction grew out of control. It was announced that Jack would fake his own death to claim on the life insurance. Darren found Jack about to commit suicide, before finding the body of Eamon Fisher (Derek Halligan). Darren and Jack decide to fake Jack's death, which Jack reluctantly agreed to. A Hollyoaks publicist told Kris Green from Digital Spy saying "Jack's at an all-time low and the finding of a dead body is too good an opportunity for him and Darren to pass up. They swap the dead man's identity with Jack's, forcing Jack to slope off into the night." They added that Darren receives the "formidable task" of telling Frankie that Jack is dead and a "tangled web of lies" develops. Eamon turns out to be the father of Kris Fisher (Gerard McCarthy) and Malachy Fisher (Glen Wallace), which puts Darren in an "extremely tricky position" as they continue to search for their father. They concluded that "It's only when Jack turns up at his own funeral that Darren realises that the situation has truly spiralled out of control".

Kirkwood revealed his plans to feature Jack and Frankie at "the centre of the programme" as they embark on becoming foster parents. Kirkwood revealed the introduction of Barry "Newt" Newton (Nico Mirallegro), who he described as a "very important character", who would become the Osborne's first foster child. Jack was featured in a story which included an under water stunt. When Jack's foster son, Newt attempts to commit suicide by drowning, Jack saves Newt's life. Executive producer Lucy Allan described it as one of her favourite scenes and branded him as "Jack the hero!"

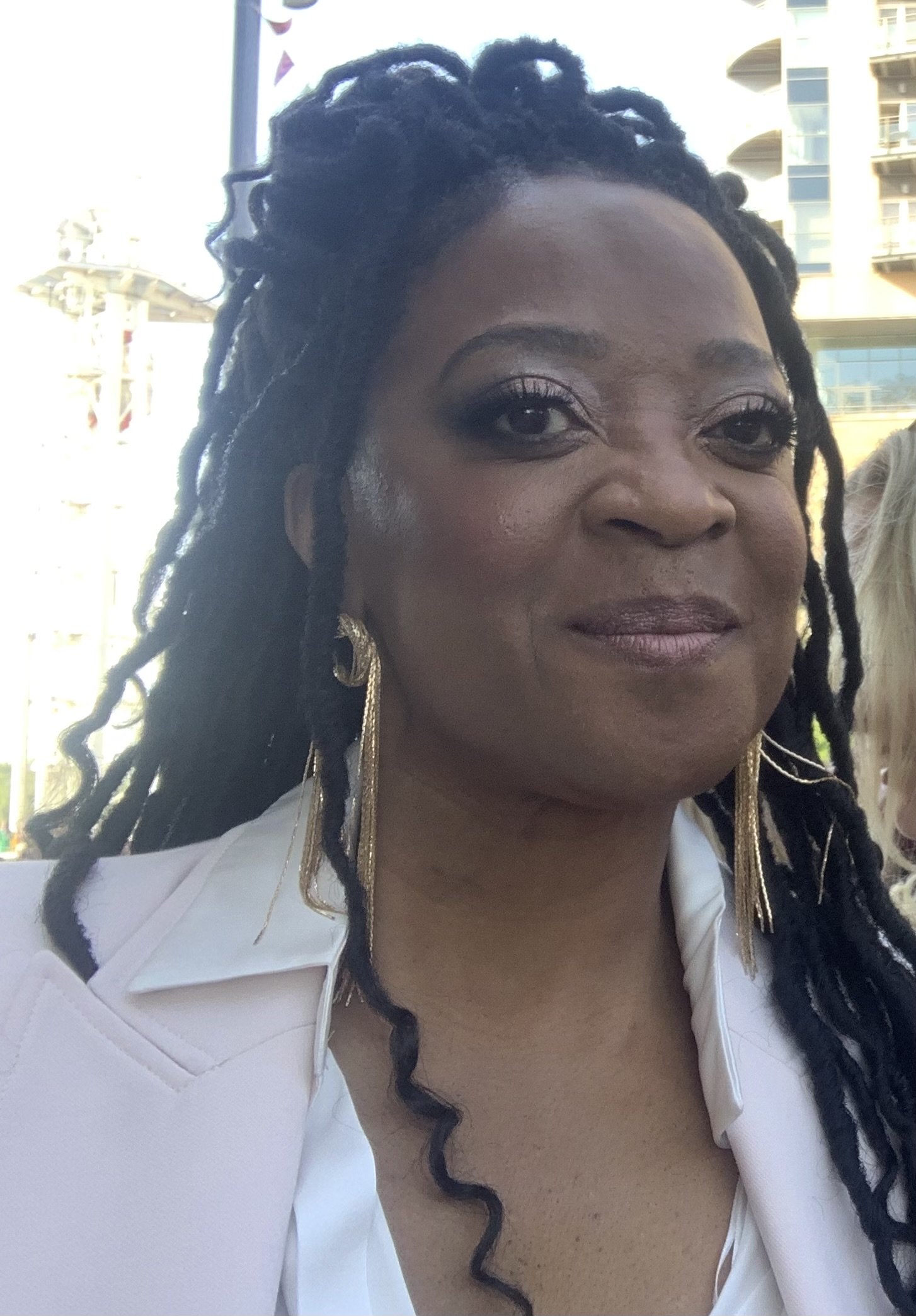
Dawn Hope portrays Pearl, who Jack begins a relationship with.

In 2023, Jack was romantically paired with Pearl Anderson (Dawn Hope). In the storyline, Pearl helps Jack host the Earl Of Dee survival workshop. Hope revealed that the romance begins from a dare, as teenagers Lucas Hay (Oscar Curtis) and Dillon Ray (Nathaniel Dass), who want to win prizes from the workshop, then play cupid and tell Pearl that Jack has been speaking so highly of her, suggesting that she ask him out. Pearl appears to fall for their trick and asks Jack out, although the pair have already realised that they have been played. Hope believed that this was the "beauty" in the beginning of the friendship and added that Pearl was previously not aware and missed all of the hints when Jack "kept coming" into her shop to buy milk. Hope enjoyed working with McKenna, calling him "awesome" and a "brilliant actor". The actors have mutual friends going back 40 years, and Hope believed that her scenes with McKenna were similar to improv. She added, "It's been so special to put these two characters together!"

Jack and Pearl spend more time together overseeing the Earl of Dee Awards and they then attend the opening of Tony Hutchinson's (Nick Pickard) new restaurant. Jack is surprised but happy to see that Pearl has arrived and whilst there, they grow close and Pearl sees another side of him when they dance together, and they ultimately kiss. Hope explained that Jack – in his "beautiful chivalry" – almost accidentally halts the romance when he tells someone that he and Pearl are just friends, which Hope revealed creates a bit of awkwardness and "wrong-foots" Pearl as she is expecting him to call her his new "lady love". Hope revealed that this makes Pearl realise that she needs to make a declaration, so she "has to lead him into it a bit with the kiss – although Jack goes with it, and is very happy!" Hope called the scene where Jack and Pearl kiss in the middle of the pub, with the crowd around them cheering at this, a "beautiful moment". Discussing the romance, Hope told Inside Soap, "Being mature, you go through processes in life of how you date. How you want to be treated grows more prevalent – and chivalry goes a long way when you're over a certain age as a woman. So when chivalry turns up in the shape of Jack, it kind of wrong foots Pearl and she goes, oh, that's nice!" Hope explained that now that Jack and Pearl are together, they need to figure out what that looks like. Months later, Pearl organises a surprise birthday party for Jack with Darren, which he appreciates. Pearl and Tony also cover for Darren when a debt collector comes looking for him, but Darren pushes them away as he does not want to open up about the extent of his problems and debt. In July 2025, Pearl briefly breaks up with Jack following various family troubles, which really upsets him.

== Storylines ==
Jack arrives in Hollyoaks with Celia and Darren (Adam Booth), where they join Jack's daughter Ruth (Terri Dwyer). Jack becomes the landlord of The Dog in the Pond, after Celia's brother Greg (Alvin Stardust), decides to sell up following the death of his daughter Natasha (Shebah Ronay). Jack immediately causes a stir when it is revealed that he is the father of teenager Dawn Cunningham's (Lisa Williamson) child Bethany (Danielle Calvert), who needs a kidney transplant. Jack donates one of his kidneys to the daughter he has never known. Dawn's sister Jude Cunningham (Davinia Taylor) tries to blackmail Jack about Bethany. However, she ends up telling everyone in The Dog. Jack tries to explain to Celia, but she ends their marriage and leaves for the US with Darren.

Jack's love life takes another twist when new barmaid Jill Patrick (Lynda Rooke) arrives with her children Kate (Natasha Symms), Gina (Dannielle Brent) and Sol (Paul Danan). Jack and Jill embark on a relationship, eventually getting married. The marriage goes well, despite a feud between the Patrick children and the Osborne children. Jack is then devastated when Jill reveals she has a fatal brain tumour. He then agrees to look after her children when she dies. When Jill does die, Jack keeps his promise and cares for her children, helping Sol flee from the police abroad. Jack embarks on several other relationships after Jill, including Geri Hudson's (Joanna Taylor) mother Jacqui and Izzy Cornwell's (Elize du Toit) mother Patty. Natalie Osborne (Tiffany Mulheron), Jack's troubled niece, arrives from Scotland for the half-term after her parents have marital problems. Natalie starts at Hollyoaks High School. However, her older sister Rachel arrives and tells Jack that Natalie is hiding that she has not got good grades at school in Scotland. For her own good, Jack sends her back home.

Jack provides a home for the Dean family after their eviction from their home. After first being sceptical, he soon warms to the family. Jack then begins a relationship with Frankie after the collapse of her marriage to her husband Johnno (Colin Wells), and the couple later marry, after five years being a widower following the death of his wife, Jill. Frankie's three children Jake, Debbie and Craig accepted him as a new father, however Steph will never accepted him as her new father and refused to be close with him, causing Frankie and Steph's siblings angry at her, but, they understand that she remain close to her father Johnno. The nadir was when the Dog was destroyed in an explosion Jack and Frankie were out for a meal when the Dog exploded and Jack and Frankie nearly lost Darren, Steph, Craig, and Jake as they were trapped inside the pub when it exploded and caught fire. While they used insurance money to rebuild the pub, they stayed at a grimy bed and breakfast where the owner constantly treated them poorly. They were kicked out, and briefly lived with the McQueen family until finally Frankie could take no more and forced Jack to use the insurance money he had been pocketing to pay for a nice hotel until they could go back to their apartment. Jack and Frankie decide to start fostering disadvantaged adolescents. They first foster Newt. Darren (now played by Ashley Taylor Dawson) sells Frankie's jewellery to a pawn shop, and blames it on Newt. After Jack threatens to send him back into care, Darren is finally caught out. Darren develops a gambling addiction. During a game of poker with Mike Barnes (Tony Hirst), Tony and Warren Fox (Jamie Lomas), he bets his half of The Dog, which Warren wins. After finding this out, Jack suffers a heart attack and Darren is told to leave the house. Warren then signs his half of The Dog over to Jack again for a low price. Despite this low price, Jack goes through money worries, and begins to water down drinks. An inspector finds this out and declares he is to take him to court. Seeing no other way, Jack decides to commit suicide so his family can claim his life insurance money. However, Darren stops him. They then discover the body of Eamon. Darren tells Jack that they could fake his death, claiming Jack is the deceased body. Jack goes along with this and his family are horrified at his apparent death. Frankie discovers Jack is alive and the pair agree to flee to Spain. Niall Rafferty (Barry Sloane), the secret son of Myra McQueen (Nicole Barber-Lane), finds out Jack is still alive and hiding in the attic of The Dog. Niall's father Martin was arrested and sent to prison by Jack. He later died. Niall attacks Jack, holding him responsible for it. He then confesses he is Myra's son and that he is going to kill his family. Jack then alerts Darren as the pair rush to find them. Tony and Dominic Reilly (John Pickard), who are also trying to find the McQueens, who are shocked, and angry, to see Jack. The four head to an abandoned church. Jack bursts in and tells Niall it is over, however Niall detonates explosives, which eventually kills Tina Reilly (Leah Hackett). Jack is then arrested and Darren admits he knew of the fake death. They are both imprisoned. During his time in prison, the Osbornes are forced to sell The Dog to the Ashworth family.

Jack is released from prison four months later. Upon his return, Frankie, Steph, Newt and Darren throw a party for him. He visits Eamon's sons, Kris and Malachy, where he learns that Darren had only offered to buy them a drink as an apology for using their father's dead body in their scam. He then kicks Darren out of the flat. Jack grows depressed, and he does not want to leave the house. After learning that Darren took £100,000 from Warren to get his stepbrother Jake Dean (Kevin Sacre) to confess to Sean Kennedy's (Matthew Jay Lewis) murder, before gambling the money away, Jack disowns him.

Jack gets a manager job in the Dog thanks to Darren. When Jack sees that Darren has become close friends with teenager Duncan Button (Dean Aspen), he realises that he has changed, so decides to reconcile with him and offers him to move in with him, and wants to include Duncan. Darren is delighted and happily accepts.

Jack supports Frankie when her daughter Steph (Carley Stenson) reveals she is dying from cervical cancer. When Steph dies in a fire at Il Gnosh, he gets deeply concerned for Frankie when she sets a table for Steph for Christmas dinner. On Christmas Eve 2010, while taking his dog for a walk with Duncan in a nearby woods, they both discover India Longford's (Beth Kingston) body, leading Jack to call the police. Jack becomes a grandfather when Suzanne Ashworth (Suzanne Hall) gives birth to Darren's twins Francine and Jack Osborne, named after Frankie and himself, and Frankie and Jack also take in Frankie's granddaughter Esther Bloom (Jazmine Franks) and Duncan's sister Ruby Button (Anna Shaffer). The Osborne house becomes even more crowded when Darren and his new fiancée Nancy Hayton (Jessica Fox) move in.

Following the departure of Carl Costello (Paul Opacic) from the village, his son Riley Costello (Rob Norbury) allows Jack, Frankie and their growing family to move back in The Dog. Jack helps Darren plan a surprise wedding to Nancy which doesn't go according to plan but ends well. Jack gains another grandson when Nancy gives birth to her and Darren's son Oscar (Ralph and Zach Norman). Jack, Frankie and Tom attend the joint wedding of Tony Hutchinson and Cindy Longford (Stephanie Waring), Ste Hay (Kieron Richardson) and Doug Carter (PJ Brennan) but Maddie Morrison (Scarlett Bowman) crashes a minibus into the venue. Jack, Frankie and Tom survive and Jack is instrumental in helping other people escape alive. Jack helps Darren and Nancy come to terms with Oscar being deaf. He then helps Darren, Nancy, Frankie, Callum Kane (Laurie Duncan) and Seamus Brady (Fintan McKeown) search for Nancy's nephew Charlie (Charlie Behan) when he goes missing and elects to stay with Charlie in the hospital, sending Nancy and Frankie home when they both want to stay.

In September 2013, Sandy Roscoe (Gillian Taylforth) who Jack had had an affair with behind her husband Alan's back, reveals that she is Darren's biological mother and Darren is shocked at the revelation and furious with his father for lying to him for his entire life. He punches Jack during the row that follows. Darren, his girlfriend Sienna Blake (Anna Passey) and Oscar move out and Darren disowns his father, leaving Jack heartbroken. However, they make up when Darren is nearly killed in an explosion. When Frankie cheats on Jack with Ziggy Roscoe (Fabrizio Santino), he is initially furious although they make up. Jack begins to struggle with getting old and pays prostitute Sinead O'Connor (Stephanie Davis) for sex. However, he is caught by Sinead's boyfriend Freddie Roscoe (Charlie Clapham) who punches Jack. Jack worries that Freddie will tell Frankie but he decides to keep quiet.

In 2016, Jack went to visit his half-brother Billy Brodie (Clive Russell) in prison, and told him he owed him nothing, but ends up devastated when he passes away, but there was more bad news, when he discovered that Jude Cunningham had arrived back in the village. He will never forgive her for what she had done for ruining his marriage with Celia. In December, he discovered that his niece Eva Falco (Kerry Bennett), Billy's daughter, had been in the village since September, she held Jack, Frankie, Tom, Kim, Esther, Darren and Nancy hostage. Eva forced Jack to admit the truth, he did so, and it was revealed that Jack had framed Billy for murder of a boy called Callum, when in fact it was Jack that had killed him. Eva said she'd never forgive her uncle for framing her father when she was young because he was in prison for the rest of his life until he died. After the admission, Eva pulled a gun out on the Osborne's and she attempted to shoot Jack but ends up shooting his step-granddaughter, Esther. After realising the heartache he caused, he decided to call the police and turn himself in after 48 years. Eva becomes wanted by the police and Jack and Liam help her get away, and Eva thank him for confess the truth. Jack mentions this the reason why he framed his brother is so he could married Celia since she was pregnant with Eva's cousin Ruth.

Jack is shocked when Frankie's ex-husband Johnno returns to the village and invites her to embark on a Cher and Elvis impersonator tour. Frankie is torn, feeling unwanted at home and longing for adventure and Jack eventually gives her an ultimatum, telling her that she should meet him at the school if she chooses him. She turns Johnno down but is unaware that Jack has been trapped under rubble following an explosion at the school. Believing that he is dying, Jack gives Darren a message for Frankie while she simultaneously tries to contact him to apologise and reaffirm her love for him. When they are unable to contact her, Diane Hutchinson (Alex Fletcher) goes to the Osbornes and finds Frankie collapsed. Jack survives and is taken to hospital where he is devastated to find out that Frankie had suffered a stroke and died. After walking in on Mac Nightingale (David Easter) as seeing his wounds, Jack quickly works out that he is responsible for trying explosion and is therefore the reason that Jack wasn't with Frankie when she died. To stop him going to the police, Mac attacks him and, believing him to be dead, dumps Jack's body in the woods where he is later discovered and taken to hospital. Mac then unsuccessfully tries to turn off Jack's life support. Jack is visited by Frankie's ghost, who convinces him to go on living. The two say a final goodbye and Jack wakes up.

Jack later starts a complicated relationship with Breda McQueen (Moya Brady), not knowing that she is a serial killer. They later get engaged which turns tumultuous when Breda discovers Jack killed Callum years prior, to her dismay. However they stay together. In January 2020, when Breda fakes having dementia, Jack plans to move to Portugal with her to spend their last days together, however Breda was using this to escape from being caught for the murders she committed. Jack realises he needs to stay and help Darren, and Breda breaks up with him before attempting to kill Darren by stabbing him in the back. After Breda is caught out, Jack is questioned by the villagers about how he didn't know what she had done, and still grieves her death despite knowing her crimes.

== Reception ==
In 2010, Regus, a temporary workplace provider conducted a survey which found that Jack was the third most popular boss from British soap operas. The character was selected as one of the "top 100 British soap characters" by industry experts. It was for a What's on TV poll titled "Who is Soap's greatest Legend?" and the magazine's readers determined the voting results. In 2003, Jack was nominated as "Best TV Barman" in a poll run by alcohol beverage company Blackthorn Cider. Kathleen Morgan from Daily Record described him as "an ex-copper who takes no nonsense from his regulars – although most of them seem to be underage". Jack McKenna has been referred to as the "grandfather of Hollyoaks" by Pete Price from Liverpool Echo. In December 2025, Chloe Timms from Inside Soap wrote that she could not wait for Pearl and Jack's wedding.
