= Celebrity Big Brother 2017 =

Celebrity Big Brother 2017 may refer to:

- Celebrity Big Brother 19
- Celebrity Big Brother 20
