= Celebrity Big Brother (British TV series) series 20 =

Season of television series

Celebrity Big Brother
- Series 20
- Series twenty logo
- Presented by: Emma Willis
- No. of days: 25
- No. of housemates: 15
- Winner: Sarah Harding
- Runner-up: Amelia Lily
- Companion shows: Big Brother's Bit on the Side
- No. of episodes: 25

Release
- Original network: Channel 5
- Original release: 1 August – 25 August 2017

Series chronology
- ← Previous; Series 19 Next → Series 21

Celebrity Big Brother 20 is the twentieth series of the British reality television series Celebrity Big Brother, hosted by Emma Willis and narrated by Marcus Bentley. The series launched on 1 August 2017, and concluded on 25 August 2017 after 25 days, making this the shortest series since Celebrity Big Brother 12 in 2013. The series was on Channel 5 in the United Kingdom and 3e in Ireland with the spin-off show Celebrity Big Brother's Bit on the Side presented by Rylan Clark-Neal. It was the thirteenth celebrity series and twentieth series of Big Brother overall to air on Channel 5.

During the launch show on 1 August 2017, Willis confirmed that the winner would receive £50,000 for a charity of their choice. This is the first celebrity series to include a prize fund since Celebrity Big Brother 3 in 2005.

On 25 August 2017, Sarah Harding was announced as the winner of the series having received 35.33% of the final vote, with Amelia Lily as the runner-up after receiving 29.92%.

== Format ==
Celebrity Big Brother is a game show in which a group of celebrity contestants, referred to as housemates, live in isolation from the outside world in a custom built "house", constantly under video surveillance. During their time in the House, the housemates are required to nominate two of their fellow contestants for potential eviction, and the two or more with the most votes would be nominated. This process is mandatory for all housemates, and failure to comply could result in expulsion from the House. The public then vote, with one of those celebrities evicted from the house. When the final week arrives, the viewers vote for which of the remaining celebrities should win the series, and the housemate with the most votes becomes the winner.

During their time in the House, housemates are given weekly tasks to perform. The housemates wager a portion of their weekly shopping budget on the task, and either win double their wagered fund or lose the wagered fund depending on their performance in the task. The housemates are required to work as a group to complete their tasks, with the format of the tasks varying based on the number of remaining housemates. Throughout the series, some housemates have been given secret tasks that must either be completed individually or with a small group; failure to do so can result in the housemate being nominated or punished in the House. Should the housemates run out of the food provided for them, an emergency ration was available to them. The housemates are forbidden from discussing nominations, and doing so could result in punishment. The format of the series is mainly seen as a social experiment, and requires housemates to interact with others who may have differing ideals, beliefs, and prejudices. Housemates are also required to make visits to the Diary Room during their stay in the House, where they are able to share their thoughts and feelings on their fellow housemates and the game.

== Housemates ==
On Day 1, fifteen celebrity housemates entered the house.

Celebrity	Age on entry	Notability	Day entered	Day exited	Status
Sarah Harding†	35	Singer and actress	1	25	Winner
Amelia Lily	22	Singer and actress	1	25	Runner-up
Sam Thompson	25	Reality TV star	1	25	3rd place
Derek Acorah†	67	Spiritual medium	1	25	4th place
Chad Johnson	29	Reality TV star	1	25	5th place
Jemma Lucy	29	Reality TV star	1	25	6th place
Shaun Williamson	51	Actor	1	23	Evicted
Helen Lederer	62	Comedian and actress	1	22	Evicted
Sandi Bogle	52	Reality TV star	1	22	Evicted
Paul Danan†	39	Actor	1	18	Evicted
Brandi Glanville	44	Reality TV star	1	18	Evicted
Jordan Davies	25	Reality TV star	1	15	Evicted
Trisha Paytas	29	Internet personality	1	11	Walked
Karthik Nagesan	34	Reality TV star	1	11	Evicted
Marissa Jade	32	Reality TV star	1	8	Evicted

=== Amelia Lily ===
Amelia Lily is a British singer, known for being a contestant on the eighth series of The X Factor; where she reached the final and finished in third place. Since leaving The X Factor, Amelia released three Top 40 songs in the UK Singles Chart, including "You Bring Me Joy" which peaked at number 2. Lily was also the support act for fellow housemate, Sarah Harding, on her arena tour as a member of Girls Aloud. As an actress, she has appeared in stage shows such as American Idiot on the West End and Joseph and the Amazing Technicolor Dreamcoat on UK tour. She entered the house on Day 1 and left on Day 25 as the runner up.

=== Brandi Glanville ===
Brandi Glanville is an American television personality, known for being a cast member on the Bravo reality series The Real Housewives of Beverly Hills from 2011 until 2015. Since then she has appeared in the seventh series of The Celebrity Apprentice in 2015 where she placed fourth, as well as taking part in Famously Single in 2016. She is the ex-wife of actor Eddie Cibrian. She entered the house on Day 1 and became the fifth housemate to leave on Day 18. She later appeared in the first series of Celebrity Big Brother in the United States.

=== Chad Johnson ===
Chad Johnson is an American television personality, known for his appearances on the ABC reality dating game shows The Bachelorette during the twelfth season, where he tried to win the heart of JoJo Fletcher, and Bachelor in Paradise for the third season. In 2017, he took part in another dating show Famously Single. He entered the house on Day 1. He eventually came fifth place on Day 25.

=== Derek Acorah ===
Derek Johnson, known better as Derek Acorah, was a British spiritual medium known for appearing on the Sky Living paranormal reality television series Most Haunted from the first series in 2001 until the sixth series in 2006. He entered the house on Day 1. He left in fourth place on Day 25. He died on 4 January 2020 following a short illness.

=== Helen Lederer ===
Helen Lederer is a British comedian, actress and writer, known for playing Catriona in the BBC sitcom Absolutely Fabulous from 1992 onwards. She is a published author, and has also made appearances in the Channel 4 soap opera Hollyoaks in 2013 and 2015 as Mariam Andrews. She entered the house on Day 1. She became the eighth housemate to be evicted on Day 22.

=== Jemma Lucy ===
Jemma Henley, known better as Jemma Lucy, is a British reality television personality and glamour model, best known as a cast member in the MTV reality series, Ex on the Beach during the third series in 2015 before later returning for the fifth All-Star series in 2016. In 2011, Jemma was a contestant in Signed by Katie Price along with Big Brother's Bit on the Side host Rylan Clark-Neal. She is also the ex-girlfriend of Celebrity Big Brother 18 winner Stephen Bear. She entered the house on Day 1. During the final on Day 25, she finished in sixth place.

=== Jordan Davies ===
Jordan Davies is a British reality television personality, best known as a cast member in the ITV2 reality series Ibiza Weekender from the first series onwards, and the MTV reality series, Ex on the Beach during the third series in 2015 before later returning for the fourth and fifth All-Star series in 2016. He is the ex-fiancé of Celebrity Big Brother 17 housemate Megan McKenna. He entered the house on Day 1 and became the fourth housemate to be evicted on Day 15.

=== Karthik Nagesan ===
Karthik Nagesan is an Indian-born British businessman and television personality, known for competing on the twelfth series of The Apprentice in 2016. He entered the house on Day 1. Karthik became the second housemate to be evicted on Day 11.

=== Marissa Jade ===
Marissa Jade is an American television personality, known for being a cast member in the VH1 reality series Mob Wives during the show's sixth and final season in 2016. She entered the house on Day 1. On Day 8, she became the first housemate to be evicted after receiving the fewest votes to save.

=== Paul Danan ===
Paul Danan was a British actor known for playing Sol Patrick in the Channel 4 soap opera Hollyoaks from 1997 until 2001. In 2005 he took part in the first series of Celebrity Love Island before later returning for the second series in 2006. He entered the house on Day 1 and became the sixth housemate to be evicted on Day 18. Danan died on 16 January 2025.

=== Sam Thompson ===
Sam Thompson is a British reality television personality, known for starring as a cast member on the E4 reality series, Made in Chelsea alongside his sister, Louise. He joined the show for the sixth series in 2013 and has remained as a cast member since. He entered the house on Day 1 and left in third place on Day 25.

=== Sandi Bogle ===
Sandy Channer, known better as Sandi Bogle, is a British television personality, known for starring in the observational documentary series, Gogglebox on Channel 4. Sandi appeared in the show from the first series in 2013 with her best friend Sandra, but left the show following its eighth series three years later. In 2016, she released her debut single "Casanova". She is the cousin of Naomi Campbell. She entered the house on Day 1. She became the seventh housemate to be evicted on Day 22.

=== Sarah Harding ===
Sarah Harding was a British singer and actress, known for being a member of the girl group Girls Aloud, which she won a place in following her appearance on the ITV television talent show Popstars: The Rivals in 2002. During her time in the group, they picked up one BRIT award and had four number one singles. However the group split in 2013, and Sarah launched a solo career. As an actress she played Joni Preston in the ITV soap opera Coronation Street in 2015. In 2016 she took part in the third series of The Jump. She entered the house on Day 1. On Day 25, it was announced that Sarah had won the series. She died on 5 September 2021 from breast cancer.

=== Shaun Williamson ===
Shaun Williamson is a British actor and singer, known for playing Barry Evans in the BBC soap opera EastEnders between 1994 and 2004. He entered the house on Day 1. He was evicted on Day 23, via the backdoor having received the fewest votes to win.

=== Trisha Paytas ===
Trisha Paytas is an American internet personality, model, actor and singer, known for her YouTube channel "blndsundoll4mj", which currently has over five million subscribers and a billion views. Her internet fame has led her to have appearances on television shows, including Modern Family and Dr. Phil. She also appeared in Eminem's "We Made You" music video and the video for Amy Winehouse's "Tears Dry on Their Own" as well as having a music career of her own. She entered the house on Day 1. On Day 11, Trisha walked from the house.

== Nominations table ==
	Day 6	Day 9	Day 13	Day 16	Day 17	Day 19	Day 25 Final		Nominations received
Sarah	Riff; Raff	Jemma, Trisha	No nominations	Brandi, Paul	Derek, Helen	Helen, Jemma	Winner (Day 25)		15
Amelia	Private; Members' Club	Karthik, Chad	No nominations	Not eligible		Chad, Sarah	Runner-up (Day 25)		0
Sam	Private; Members' Club	Karthik, Brandi	No nominations	Brandi, Paul	Derek, Helen	Sarah, Chad	Third place (Day 25)		1
Derek	Private; Members' Club	Helen, Sarah	No nominations	Not eligible		Jemma, Sarah	Fourth place (Day 25)		1
Chad	Riff; Raff	Karthik, Helen	No nominations	Not eligible		Sandi, Jemma	Fifth place (Day 25)		9
Jemma	Private; Members' Club	Sarah, Karthik	No nominations	Not eligible		Sarah, Chad	Sixth place (Day 25)		4
Shaun	Marissa	Chad, Sarah	No nominations	Not eligible		Sarah, Chad	Evicted (Day 23)		0
Helen	Private; Members' Club	Sarah, Chad	No nominations	Not eligible		Sam, Sarah	Evicted (Day 22)		4
Sandi	Private; Members' Club	Chad, Sarah	No nominations	Not eligible		Chad, Sarah	Evicted (Day 22)		1
Paul	Private; Members' Club	Trisha, Sarah	No nominations	Not eligible		Evicted (Day 18)			3
Brandi	Private; Members' Club	Sarah, Karthik	No nominations	Not eligible		Evicted (Day 18)			3
Jordan	Private; Members' Club	Trisha, Karthik	No nominations	Evicted (Day 15)					0
Trisha	Riff; Raff	Sarah, Paul	Walked (Day 11)						3
Karthik	Riff; Raff	Brandi, Paul	Evicted (Day 11)						6
Marissa	Riff; Raff	Evicted (Day 8)							1
Notes	1, 2	none	3	4, 5		4	6		
Against public vote	Chad, Karthik, Marissa, Sarah, Trisha	Chad, Karthik, Sarah, Trisha	Helen, Jemma, Jordan, Sam	Brandi, Derek, Helen, Paul		Chad, Helen, Jemma, Sam, Sandi, Sarah	Amelia, Chad, Derek, Jemma, Sam, Sarah, Shaun		
Walked	none		Trisha	none					
Evicted	Marissa; Fewest votes to save	Karthik; Fewest votes to save	Jordan; Fewest votes to save	Brandi; Fewest votes to save		Sandi; Fewest votes to save	Shaun; 0.72% (out of 7)	Jemma; 4.83% (out of 6)	
Evicted	Marissa; Fewest votes to save	Karthik; Fewest votes to save	Jordan; Fewest votes to save	Brandi; Fewest votes to save		Sandi; Fewest votes to save	Chad; 5.48% (out of 6)	Derek; 8.92% (out of 4)	
Evicted	Marissa; Fewest votes to save	Karthik; Fewest votes to save	Jordan; Fewest votes to save	Paul; Fewest votes to save		Helen; Fewest votes to save	Sam; 14.8% (out of 3)	Amelia; 29.92% (out of 2)	
Evicted	Marissa; Fewest votes to save	Karthik; Fewest votes to save	Jordan; Fewest votes to save	Paul; Fewest votes to save		Helen; Fewest votes to save	Sarah; 35.33% to win		

Notes

- ^Note 1: On Day 1, Shaun was given a secret mission to win immunity and the power to give a killer nomination. However, he failed the task and was therefore eligible to be nominated, but still had to give a killer nomination. He chose Marissa.
- ^Note 2: From Day 4 to 6, housemates competed to earn membership to the "Private Members' Club", where they lived a life of luxury and were immune from the first eviction. As Trisha accepted a temptation of pizza, she automatically put herself up for eviction. As Chad, Karthik and Sarah failed to gain membership by the end of Day 6, they joined Marissa and Trisha in facing eviction.
- ^Note 3: Housemates competed against each other in two teams in order to win immunity. The blue team won the task, also saving Sandi and Shaun from eviction.
- ^Note 4: This eviction was a double eviction.
- ^Note 5: Sam and Sarah were chosen by the public to be the killers in the criminal case and, over Day 16 and 17, they had to killer nominate by "murdering" the housemate they have chosen. At the end of Day 17, detectives Brandi and Paul would have to choose which housemates they thought were the killers. If they had guessed correctly, the identified killers would face the public vote. However, they guessed incorrectly and the killers were immune.
- ^Note 6: The public were voting to win rather than to save. The votes were frozen on Day 23, where the housemate with the fewest votes was evicted via the backdoor. The voting percentages reflect the overall share of the final vote when the lines closed for good, and do not account for intermittent voting freezes. Sarah won with 54.15% of the vote over Amelia.

== Summary ==
Day 1	Entrances	Shaun, Sarah, Sam, Derek, Marissa, Sandi, Chad, Helen, Karthik, Brandi, Jordan, Trisha, Jemma, Amelia and Paul entered the house.
Day 1	Twists	Immediately after entering the house, Shaun was given a secret mission to act increasingly nervous each time a new housemate entered the house and complete several challenges. He failed, meaning he received a killer nomination to give to somebody.
Day 1	Nominations	As a result of Shaun's task, he was required to give a killer nomination. He chose Marissa and she faced the public vote.
Day 2	Tasks	Housemates took part in a talent show with Chad, Helen and Sandi as judges. Jordan and Sam ultimately won.
Day 3	Tasks	Housemates were split into two teams and had to guess which housemate from the opposing team each fact was about. If they got it right, the housemate would be gunged.
Day 4	Punishments	As a punishment for Brandi, Jordan and Sam discussing nominations, all luxury food was removed from the house and housemates had to live on basic rations.
Day 4	Tasks	Derek, Helen and Paul won today's task and therefore membership to "Big Brothers Private Members' Club", where they lived a life of luxury and were immune from the first public vote.
Day 5	Tasks	For today's task, housemates who weren't members of the "Private Members' Club" had to wait under a star for it to fall and reveal a gift. Unbeknownst to them, the gifts were allocated to them by the current members. However, if they failed to catch their star they didn't win the reward. During this task, Brandi, Sam and Shaun won membership.; Big Brother offered non-members a temptation in return for no further chances to win immunity and therefore automatically face the first public vote. Trisha was the only housemate to accept this.
Day 6	Tasks	The members of the "Private Members' Club" chose the final three to face the public vote. They chose Chad, Karthik and Sarah, who joined Marissa and Trisha in facing the first public vote. Amelia, Jemma, Jordan and Sandi therefore joined the "Private Members' Club" and were safe from eviction.
Day 8	Tasks	Led by Derek, the Housemates took part in a ghostly tour in both the Blossom Suite and the Forest Suite.
Day 8	Exits	Marissa was evicted from the house, receiving the fewest votes to save.
Day 9	Nominations	The housemates nominated for the first time. Chad, Karthik, Sarah and Trisha received the most nominations and faced the public vote.
Day 9	Punishments	Sam was given a formal and final warning for breaching the rules after unwanted, intimate conduct with Jemma.
Day 10	Tasks	Sandi was given a secret mission to prove that she's the best housemate at twerking, acting and flirting.
Day 11	Exits	Karthik was evicted from the house, receiving the fewest votes to save.; Trisha walked from the house.
Day 12	Tasks	Housemates competed in "Cheerleading Camp". After being voted for by the public to be captains, Sarah captained Amelia, Brandi, Chad, Derek and Paul, whilst Sandi captained Helen, Jemma, Jordan, Sam and Shaun. They competed against each other, with the winning team earning immunity from the next eviction.
Day 13	Nominations	The blue team won the cheerleading competition and therefore immunity. They had to choose two people from the red team to save from facing eviction. They chose Sandi and Shaun meaning that Helen, Jemma, Jordan and Sam faced the public vote.
Day 14	Punishments	After a lot of unruly behaviour, Big Brother banned alcohol in the house until further notice.
Day 15	Tasks	Housemates took part in a pub quiz.
Day 15	Exits	Jordan was evicted from the house, receiving the fewest votes to save.
Day 16	Tasks	The criminal case opened with all housemates as suspects, apart from Brandi and Paul who became detectives.
Day 16	Nominations	The killers; Sam and Sarah, killer nominated Brandi and Paul by drawing a red "X" over their housemate screen, then later killer nominated Derek and Helen by placing horse heads in their beds.
Day 17	Nominations	Brandi and Paul incorrectly guessed that Sarah and Sandi were the killers meaning that Sam and Sarah's killer nominations faced the public vote.
Day 18	Tasks	Housemates took part in a rap battle.
Day 18	Exits	Brandi and Paul were evicted from the house, receiving the fewest votes to save.
Day 19	Nominations	Housemates entered "The Vault" to nominate. Chad, Helen, Jemma, Sam, Sandi and Sarah received the most nominations and faced the public vote.
Day 20	Tasks	Housemates re-entered "The Vault" for contact with their friends and family.
Day 22	Tasks	For today's task, '"Taco Tuesday" Amelia, Chad and Shaun were dressed as tacos, whilst trying to collect the most cheese, fish guts and tomatoes, assisted by the rest of the housemates dressed as fast food workers.
Day 22	Exits	Sandi and Helen were evicted from the house, receiving the fewest votes to save.
Day 23	Tasks	Evicted housemates, Brandi, Jordan, Karthik, Marissa and Paul hijacked the Big Brother house.
Day 23	Exits	Shaun was evicted from the house via the backdoor, receiving the fewest votes to win thus far.
Day 25	Exits	Jemma left the house in sixth place, Chad left the house in fifth place, Derek left the house in fourth place and Sam left the house in third place. It was then revealed that Sarah was the winner, leaving Amelia as the runner-up.

== Production ==
=== Eye logo ===
The eye was released on 19 July 2017 and features a metallic golden eye.

=== Teasers ===
On 24 July 2017, a three-second teaser was released promoting the series. It includes a swimming pool with a "#CBB" inflatable in the water. The full length trailer was released on 26 July 2017. During the live final of Big Brother 18, a further trailer was released showing glimpses of the celebrities.

=== House ===
On 1 August 2017, the day of the launch, the official house pictures were released. The house clearly resembles from the one previously used from the last civilian season with boxed interior designs with flat toned colors that spans even with the redecorated garden. The new house includes two bedrooms, "Forest Suite" and "Blossom Suite".

== Ratings ==
Official ratings are taken from BARB. Ratings for the episodes on 12 and 19 August (Saturday on Week 3 and 4) include the first-look episode, which aired earlier in the evening on 5Star.

	Official viewers (millions)			
	Week 1	Week 2	Week 3	Week 4
Saturday		1.53	1.53	1.53
Sunday		1.71	1.69	1.80
Monday		1.84	1.76	1.79
Tuesday	2.11	1.73	1.89	1.77
Wednesday	2.21	1.86	1.92	1.77
Thursday	2.04	1.87	1.88	1.76
Friday	1.79	1.52	1.44	1.87
Weekly average	2.04	1.72	1.73	1.76
Running average	2.04	1.88	1.83	1.81
Series average	1.8			
blue-coloured boxes denote live shows.
