= Natalie Buxton =

- 'Bad Girls' character
- Portrayed by: Dannielle Brent
- Duration: Series 6–8
- First appearance: "Episode #6.1"
- Last appearance: "Christmas Special (2006)"
In-universe information
- Occupation: Sex trafficker 'Top dog' of G-Wing at HMP Larkhall (2004–2005)

Natalie Buxton is a fictional character in the prison drama series Bad Girls, portrayed by Dannielle Brent during the last three series. She mainly featured in an antagonistic role and was killed off towards the end of the final series. She subsequently returned as a ghost in the 2006 Christmas Special, which was also the series finale. The role was originally offered to Danniella Westbrook.

== Storylines ==
=== Series 6 ===
Natalie arrives at Larkhall with tough talking prostitute Frances Allen. Natalie herself is a meek school teacher who has been arrested for income-tax fraud. As she arrives on G-Wing, word gets around that Natalie is a nonce (prison slang for child molester), so the other prisoners begin picking on her, but Frances protects her. When she asks Frances to make a phone call for her, this results in a truck being pulled over and a number of refugee children are discovered inside, set to be sold as sex slaves. When Natalie is informed about this, she reveals that she has sexually abused children before in front of Allen, who is actually Detective Inspector Frances Myers (Eva Pope), who was working undercover to entrap Natalie. Frances is subsequently given the job of Wing Governor and Natalie is transferred to another prison.

When Natalie returns weeks later, she has become much tougher, revealing her previous meek disposition was a ruse. The women of G-Wing and the officers alike are disgusted at Natalie's return to Larkhall. The women stand their ground and begin chanting "Nonce, nonce, nonce..." at Natalie and promise to give her a hard time. When Natalie confesses to being a paedophile, Frances slaps her, just as Colin Hedges (Tristan Surrock) walks into her office. Following a fight with Al McKenzie (Pauline Campbell), in which Natalie stamps on Al with her high heels after Al brandished a straight razor, Natalie manipulates her into thinking that her boyfriend had actually abused the children. She sets up a plan with Bev Tull (Amanda Barrie) and Phyl Oswyn (Stephanie Beacham) to trap Julie Saunders' (Victoria Alcock) hand in a sewing machine, and make it look like an accident. Natalie saves Julie's hand, badly cutting her own in the process. This, however, wins over the other inmates. After Phyl and Bev make rhubarb hootch, which results in Al dying, Natalie blackmails them and forces them to poison Frances with it; the attempt fails, however. Natalie then does acts of sodomy with fellow prisoner Kris Yates (Jennifer Ness), who is also in a secret same-sex relationship with officer Selena Geeson (Charlotte Lucas). Natalie does her best to split them up, and reports their relationship when Kris rejects her advances and attacks her. Kris is branded a bully and Natalie is released from Cellular Confinement. Phyl and Bev plan to cut all ties with Natalie and set her up to be attacked by Darlene Cake (Antonia Okonma). Natalie, however, gets the better of her and wins the fight. Natalie then turns the tables on them and ropes them into scaring Darlene by making her think she is cursed. When Kris escapes, Natalie continues to expose the relationship between Selena and Kris, so Frances has Natalie put on the transfer list.

=== Series 7 ===
When the seventh series begins, Natalie is still at Larkhall and Frances has been transferred to another prison and promoted to Governing Governor. Now, free of Frances, Natalie enlists herself as Top Dog and begins a reign of terror with Darlene roped in for help. She begins a tax racket and all of the women fall victims. New inmates, Janine Nebeski (Nicola Stapleton) and Arun Parmar (Rebecca Hazlewood) become Natalie's newest victims when she stabs Janine in the eye with a needle and steals from Arun. Janine figures that she would be safer to become an ally of Natalie. The two then attack Arun in the library, though Janine is forced into doing so. When Jim Fenner (Jack Ellis) is released from prison and is reinstated as the Governor of G-Wing, Natalie begins an affair with him and is determined to let his wife Di Barker (Tracey Wilkinson) know about it. Di slaps Natalie in front of the other prisoners when she finds out, which is what Natalie wants. Di is then forced to apologise to Natalie in front of everyone. Natalie then plans an escape on her "weekend out" with Janine. Fenner also promises her compassionate leave for the weekend. Her first attempt is thwarted before she can leave the prison, when Pat Kerrigan (Liz May Brice) arrives and holds Sister Thomas Moore hostage. Natalie and Fenner's relationship soon becomes hostile and it is not long before she ends up becoming one of his many enemies.

Natalie, Janine and Darlene begin to torment Arun when they discover she is a male-to-female transsexual. Before Arun is transferred to a men's prison or commits suicide, Natalie's newfound arch enemy, Pat, defends her. The two fight and Natalie is dethroned as Top Dog. This fight resulted in Brent sustaining a broken nose.

When Fenner is murdered by Julie Johnston (Kika Mirylees), Natalie becomes a suspect, but Di is wrongly charged with the murder. Natalie then continues to plan her escape and is almost successful in her bid to break free. But Pat organises a mob to wait for Natalie outside the hotel and stop her. Natalie is slapped by one of the angry women, so she headbutts them right back. Natalie begins having sex with prison officer Kevin Spiers (Andrew Scarborough) but he turns violent when her true colours show. When Natalie's visit with Iga Lukasiak, one of the children that she sold as a sex slave is recorded and played to the whole of G-Wing, the entire prison turn against Natalie, including Darlene and Janine. Natalie's hopes of an appeal for her case are dashed.

Natalie resumes her affair with Kevin, but Chaplain. Christy Mackay (Gaynor Howe) discovers their relationship and threatens to report it. Natalie then manipulates mentally ill prisoner Miranda Miles (Nicola Redmond) into murdering Christy.

=== Series 8 ===
Natalie has found a new ally, in the form of new inmate, Ashley Wilcox (Sandra De Sousa), and the two torment new Muslim inmate, Emira Al Jahani (Laura Dos Santos), into making crystal meth. Ashley is later found dead of Legionnaires' disease. Natalie then incites the women to attack new officer Donny Kimber (Sid Owen), and evacuate the prison. Natalie forces Janine to smuggle drugs back to the prison when she returns from her mother's funeral. Janine is found out, however, and Pat gets revenge on her on Janine's behalf by forcing her to swallow a mouthful of drugs.

Natalie and Pat's feud gets heated and the two begin to plot against each other. Natalie incites a mentally disturbed new inmate, Angela Robbins, into attacking Pat. Natalie then has drugs smuggled into prison by getting someone to visit her with a young child and hide the drugs in the child's vagina. Pat finds this out and is determined to make Natalie pay. Pat manipulates Natalie into thinking she has an escape plan with the help of The Julies and Tina. Natalie then beats up Julie S and falls into the trap when Julie S exposes Pat's "escape plan". However, Pat has made a change to the plan and plans to stab Natalie with a gardening fork. On the day of Julie's son's wedding blessing, Natalie goes ahead with the escape. Pat and Natalie fight against time to get to the bin's first. Natalie gets there first. Natalie plans to hide in a bin bag, and leave in the bin truck. Pat, however, also has other plans.

Pat arrives at the bin's and begins to attack a bin bag with the gardening fork but Natalie is hiding behind her and a fight erupts between the two. The fight ends when one of them is bludgeoned to death with a brick, this is later revealed to be Natalie. Everyone believes that Natalie has escaped and that Pat's plan was unsuccessful. The Julies discover that this is not true and find Natalie's body. The three then plot how to dispose of Natalie's corpse, her body is then dropped down a drain, into the sewers, and forgotten about.

==== Ghost ====
In the final episode of Bad Girls, Natalie's decaying corpse is clogging up the prison drains. With Pat down the block, the Julies have to resolve the problem.

Julie S later goes down to the sewers to move the body. Sylvia Hollamby (Helen Fraser), has a dream reminiscent of A Christmas Carol, in which the ghost of Natalie Buxton appears and tells Sylvia that she is dead and that her body is what is causing the problems at Larkhall. She also tells Sylvia that she is now the most hated woman in the prison, even more so than Natalie was. Natalie shows her how happy everyone, including her son, would be after hearing she was dead, and then takes Sylvia down to the sewers and shows her the potential result of her ways. Sylvia wakes up from the dream and returns to work. She then confides in Pat that she thinks Natalie is dead. Pat shrugs it off and continues to celebrate Christmas.
