= Sol Patrick =

- Hollyoaks character
- Portrayed by: Paul Danan
- Duration: 1997–2001
- First appearance: 3 November 1997
- Last appearance: 5 April 2001
In-universe information
- Mother: Louise
- Adoptive mother: Jill Patrick
- Stepfather: Jack Osborne
- Brothers: Joe Johnson (adoptive)
- Sisters: Gina Patrick; Kate Patrick (adoptive)

Sol Patrick is a fictional character from the British soap opera Hollyoaks, played by Paul Danan. The character debuted on-screen during the episode broadcast on 3 November 1997.

== Casting ==
Danan made his first appearance on 3 November 1997. Danan graduated from Italia Conti Academy of Theatre Arts, where he shared classes with Natasha Symms and Dannielle Brent, who went on to play his character's sisters Kate Patrick and Gina Patrick. The trio shared a house in Liverpool after they were cast in Hollyoaks. Danan was grateful for his "big break", stating "There's so many actors out there and not much work all the time, it's very hard, so I think I'm really lucky to have this."

== Development ==
In the book, Phil Redmond's Hollyoaks: The Official Companion, Matthew Evans described Sol as "mean, moody and volatile". He added that to those who know Sol, he is "a misunderstood and sensitive guy". To others he appears as "a troublemaker who wasn't worth bothering with." He has redeeming features in his characterisation such as his "determination to protect his family" and his "unconventional upbringing". Evans also assessed that Sol develops a "penchant for stealing cars" to help with his frustrations. In one storyline, Sol is imprisoned for driving without a license. His cell mate commits suicide via hanging himself and writers used the events as a catalyst to add changes to Sol's characterisation. Upon his release, Sol is a "changed man" who decides to begin his own car washing business.

In one storyline, Sol and Gina discover that Jill Patrick (Lynda Rooke) is not their biological mother. Jill reveals that their biological mother committed suicide and she decided to bring the children up as her own. They react negatively to Jill's revelation and both move out of the family home. Some of Hollyoaks' storyline writers needed a Patrick family tree to help them understand the story of how the Patricks are all related. When Jill is injured in a car accident, Sol realises via shock how much Jill means to him. Writers later killed Jill off in a brain tumour storyline, they portrayed Sol as being "devastated" and he returns to his old ways and becomes homeless.

For the cliffhanger final episode of 2000, Sol and his girlfriend Jess Holt (Frankie Hough) were trapped by a fire "in the Hollyoaks local". Wendy Granditer of Inside Soap observed that Sol's life "has been turned upside down" since he began a relationship with Jess. Part of Jess' characterisation is her trust issues but writers used Sol to change Jess' life. Hough told Francesca Babb from All About Soap that Jess' trust issues are a result of her past experiences. She stated that Sol's support changes this, adding "it's taken her a long time to finally realise that Sol really does care about her. He has also refrained from sleeping with her until now." Hough believed that Sol's abstinence "shocked" Jess, who had come to view men as only wanting her for sex. Hough opined that Sol and Jess were similar because Sol was homeless "so he knows part of what she is going through." Jess' brother and pimp, Steve Holt (Conor Ryan) kidnaps Gina which leaves Jess feeling "gutted" and "hates" that her brother is harming Sol's family. Sol's step-father Jack Osborne (Jimmy McKenna) instigates Steve's arrest and Gina is eventually freed.

The character's final episode aired on 5 April 2001, following a storyline in which Sol is falsely accused of trying to kill Jess' brother Steve Holt (Conor Ryan). A writer for Virgin Media said Sol ended up "fleeing the area for his own good". Danan found the scenes in which Sol confides in his former stepfather Jack Osborne (Jimmy McKenna) to be "really touching" and said he and McKenna cried for real. Danan also explained to Granditer that the final shot had to be filmed multiple times to get it right and he felt that it would never end. His leaving party was held that same night and then he returned to London. Danan was happy with his exit storyline, saying "It was great that they left it open rather than killing him off. Sol didn't kill anyone, or commit any crime, all he did was protect his girlfriend, so there's no reason why he can't return one day." In 2017, Danan said he was speaking with the showrunners to bring back his character, though a representative for Hollyoaks denied any such talks. In 2018, he continued to publicly voice his support for Sol's return. Danan appeared as Sol in a total of 249 episodes.

== Reception ==
In 1999, Danan received a nomination for Best Actor at the Inside Soap Awards.

In November 1999, an All About Soap critic praised Danan's performance stating "he might not be tall but with acting talent like his, Paul Danan always makes a big impression as Hollyoaks' Sol." A writer from Virgin Media branded Sol as the show's "resident bad boy" with a history of homelessness, a stint in a Young Offender Institution, and a temperament that causes him trouble. Describing Sol, Dawn Collinson of the Liverpool Echo wrote "With his bad lad reputation and close-cropped moody look, Hollyoaks' Sol Patrick is quite a handful." She noted that without his character's trademark clothing and attitude, Danan was much warmer. He told Collinson that his character "stresses too much", where as he was a more chilled and loving person. Collinson observed that since his introduction to Hollyoaks, Danan had been dubbed a "heartthrob" and was popular with female viewers. Danan admitted that the fan mail gave him confidence, saying I wouldn't really want to date a fan because me and Sol are two separate people, but reading some of the letters really brings me back up if I'm feeling down."

Emma Saunders and Ian Youngs from BBC News described Sol as "a tearaway and a fan favourite - and something of a heartthrob - on the soap." Tom McArdle of The Daily Telegraph, Ben Waddell from Glasgow Times and Bethany Minelle writing for Sky News branded Sol a "bad boy" character. Minelle added that Danan "quickly became a fan favourite." Tina Campbell and William Mata from Evening Standard similarly wrote as Sol, "Danan was a favourite on the soap." K. J. Yossman from Variety described Sol as a "troubled young man".

After Danan's death, the scriptwriter Richard Burke branded him "a Hollyoaks icon", adding that Danan captured "Sol's vulnerability hidden beneath a spiky exterior." Burke described Sol as "often misguided, never unwatchable, you loved Sol as you either knew someone like him, fancied someone like him, or feared that maybe you were him, Paul brought to life Sol's journey from teenage tearaway to leading man with such charm and heart that no matter what trouble Sol was in, you were always on his side."
