= Jimmy McKenna =

Scottish actor

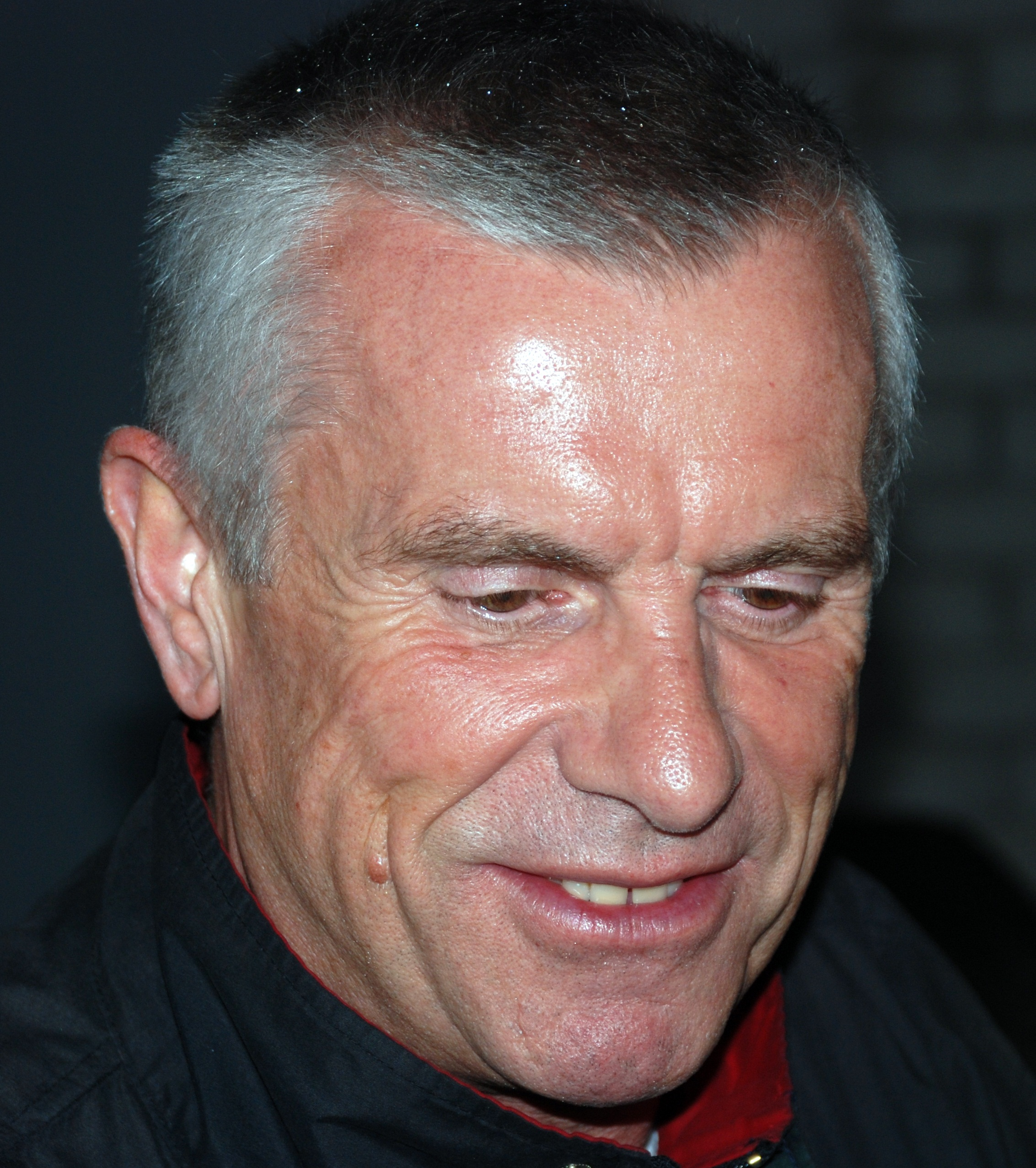
- McKenna in 2009
- Born: Glasgow, Scotland
- Occupation: Actor
- Years active: 1984–present
- Television: Waterfront Beat; Hollyoaks; A Touch of Frost
- Spouse: Beverly McKenna (died 2025)
- Children: 4

James Stephen McKenna is a Scottish actor. He is known for his roles as Jack Osborne in the Channel 4 soap opera Hollyoaks and Don Brady in A Touch of Frost.

== Career ==
McKenna's first job was as a professional footballer. His football career with Sheffield Wednesday F.C. ended after a back injury.

McKenna has played Jack Osborne in the Channel 4 soap opera Hollyoaks since 1996 and is the second longest-serving character in the serial.

== Personal life ==
McKenna lives in Sheffield, England. His wife Beverly died in 2025. McKenna has 7 SCE Ordinary Grades. McKenna is a fan of Frank Sinatra as well as Sammy Cahn and Dean Martin.

== Filmography ==
Title	Year	Role	Notes
Coronation Street	1985	Jim Lomax	1 episode
Affairs of the Heart	1985	Policeman	Episode 6
Highlander	1986	Father Rainey	
Taggart	1986	Stephen Hendry	Episode: "Death Call"
Scene	1986	Teacher	Episode: "Two of Us"
Waterfront Beat	1990–1991	Gerry Cookson	5 episodes
Perfect Scoundrels	1991	Frazer Hurley	Episode: "Ssh, You Know Who"
Rumpole of the Bailey	1992	D.S. Appleby	Episode: "Rumpole and the Reform of Joby Jonson"
"Soldier, soldier"	1993		Season 3 episode 3
September Song	1993	Doctor	Episode 6
Heartbeat	1993	S.I.B. Majore	Episode: "Over the Hill"
Between the Lines	1993	George McKenzie	Episode: "Crack Up"
All in the Game	1993	Ray Peters	TV mini-series
Coronation Street	1994	Immigration Officer	2 episodes
Pie in the Sky	1995	Micheal Meredith	Episode: "Hard Cheese"
A Touch of Frost	1996–2010	Sgt. Don Brady	Supporting character; 25 episodes
When Saturday Comes	1996	George McCabe	
Hollyoaks	1996–present	Jack Osborne	Series regular
Taggart	1997	Joss Metcalfe	Episode: "Babushka"
Hollyoaks: Movin' On	2001	Jack Osborne	Spin-off series
Hollyoaks Later	2020	Jack Osborne	2020 special
