= Dannielle Brent =

British actress (b. 1979)

- Born: 19 September 1979 (age 46); Rush Green, London, UK
- Other name: Danielle Brent
- Education: Italia Conti Academy of Theatre Arts
- Occupation: Actress
- Years active: 1997–present
- Partner: Eran Creevy
- Children: 1

Dannielle Brent (born 19 September 1979), also known as Danielle Brent, is a British actress best known for her roles on Hollyoaks as Gina Patrick and Natalie Buxton in Bad Girls.

== Early life ==
Brent was accepted into the Italia Conti Academy of Theatre Arts. When she was 15, Brent performed in the Children's Royal Variety Show and wanted to become a musical performer, however she soon changed her mind and wanted to become an actress.

== Career ==
Brent began her acting career when she was 18 by landing a part as lesbian eco-warrior Gina Patrick in Hollyoaks. Since then, Brent has starred in Dream Team as Jennifer Taylor, One Man and His Dog as Danielle, Casualty as Sharon Court and in Bad Girls. It was through Bad Girls she became more known. She played Series 6, 7 and 8's biggest bitch, as psychopathic Top Dog Natalie Buxton who was killed by rival Pat Kerrigan (Liz May Brice).

Brent has also appeared in many magazines, such as Bliss, Sugar, Top of the Pops, Smash Hits, FHM and many more.

In June 2011, Brent also played Willa in Big Finish Productions, Doctor Who audio drama Animal. In 2014, Brent appeared in Top Dog.

== Personal life ==
In March 2012, Brent gave birth to her first child, a daughter.

== Filmography ==
Film
Year	Title	Role	Notes
2004	One Man and His Dog	Danielle	
2008	Shifty	Jasmine	
2010	We Are the Industry	Emma	
2012	Ill Manors	Jo	
2012	Cockneys vs Zombies	Mum MacGuire	
2013	Welcome to the Punch	Karen Edwards	
2014	Top Dog	Samantha	
2015	One Behind	Roxanne	Short
2016	Stoner Express	Pixie	Originally titled AmStarDam

Television
Year	Title	Role	Notes
1997, 2009	The Bill	Kelly Sumner	Episode: "True to Life Player"
1997, 2009	The Bill	Lucy Fuller	Episode: "Absolute Power"
1997–2001	Hollyoaks	Gina Patrick	Regular role
1999	Brookside: Double Take!	Ted's PA	Video special
2002–2003	Dream Team	Jennifer Taylor	Series 6 (recurring role, 9 episodes)
2004–2006	Bad Girls	Natalie Buxton	Series 6–8 (regular role, 30 episodes)
2005, 2009, 2011	Casualty	Sharon Court	Episode: "Getting Involved"
2005, 2009, 2011	Casualty	Amy	Episode: "Better Drowned"
2005, 2009, 2011	Casualty	Esther Cobb	Episode: "System Error"
2015	Doctors	Yvonne Bailey	Episode: "Date in the Diary"
2023	The Reckoning	Kevin's Mum	Series 1, Episode 3

Voice work
Year	Title	Role	Notes
2011	Doctor Who: The Lost Stories	Willa	Episode: "Animal"
