= Paul Danan =

English actor and television personality (1978–2025)

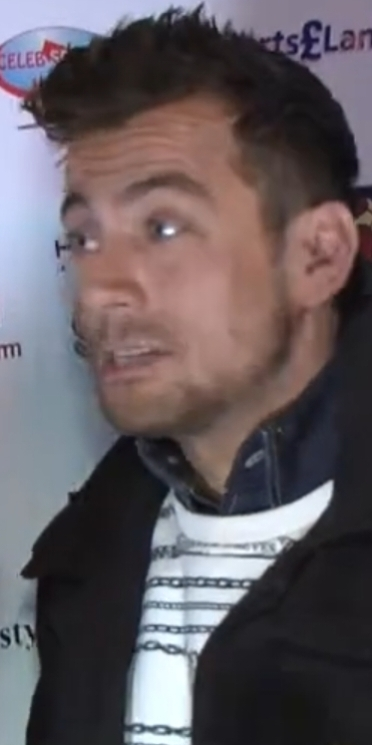
- Danan in 2015
- Born: Paul Louis Danan; 2 July 1978; Chigwell, Essex, England
- Died: 15 January 2025 (aged 46); Brislington, Bristol, England
- Education: Italia Conti Academy of Theatre Arts
- Occupations: Actor; television personality
- Years active: 1995–2025
- Children: 1

Paul Louis Danan (2 July 1978 – 15 January 2025) was an English actor and television personality, known for playing the role of Sol Patrick in the Channel 4 soap opera Hollyoaks, between 1997 and 2001. In 2005, he appeared as a contestant on the first series of ITV's Celebrity Love Island and returned for the second series in 2006. He was also a housemate on the twentieth series of Celebrity Big Brother in 2017.

== Early life ==
Danan was born in Chigwell, Essex, to a Moroccan Jewish family, on 2 July 1978. His father was from Fez, Morocco. Danan attended the Italia Conti Academy of Theatre Arts.

== Career ==
Between 1997 and 2001, Danan played Sol Patrick in the Channel 4 soap opera, Hollyoaks. Following his departure from the soap, he played "the Monster" in Desires of Frankenstein by James Martin Charlton at the 2002 Edinburgh Festival Fringe. In 2002, Danan played Melody's Agent Max Mitford in the CBBC series The Queen's Nose. In 2005, he appeared as a contestant on the first series of ITV's Celebrity Love Island. He returned for the second series in 2006. Following his appearance on the show, Danan won funniest reality TV personality at the 2007 Loaded Lafta Awards. The same year, he appeared in an episode of Dick & Dom in da Bungalow and presented a television series entitled Test Drive My Girlfriend on ITV2. In September 2006, Danan appeared in the ITV2 series Calum, Fran and Dangerous Danan, in which he traveled from Texas to Los Angeles on America's U.S. Route 66 with Calum Best and Fran Cosgrave. In 2007, Danan was due to play Jack in Jack & the Beanstalk at the Preston Guild Hall, but he was sacked after swearing during the Christmas Lights switch on.

In 2009, Danan was a guest on the first and second series of the Channel 4 sketch show The Kevin Bishop Show. From 2010 to 2011, he co-hosted Stars and Strikes for 4Music with presenter Rick Edwards playing a ten-frame ten-pin bowling match against a popstar or group. In November 2012, Danan appeared in an episode of ITV drama Crime Stories. In 2015, he played the character Steve in the TV series Good Girls Club for Sky TV. In August 2017, Danan competed in the twentieth series of Celebrity Big Brother. On Day 18, he became the fifth evictee. On an episode of The Jeremy Kyle Show broadcast on ITV on 9 February 2019, Danan discussed his substance addiction. He admitted to being a recovering addict. In January 2022, Danan appeared on the seventh series of E4's Celebrity Coach Trip in Northern Portugal, where he was put with Team GB athlete Ashley McKenzie. Danan and McKenzie joined a line-up which featured fellow celebrity travellers like Matt Richardson, Honey G, Ginny Lemon, pop duo Honeyz, and Birds of a Feather stars Linda Robson and Lesley Joseph.

== Personal life ==
Danan previously lived in Hertford, where he ran a drama club for local children. He had one son.

=== Legal issues ===
In 2010, Danan was given a £350 fine after he was found to be in possession of drugs and swore at a police officer. He was accused of driving under the influence of drugs in Warrington on 2 October 2024. Before his death, Danan had been due to appear at court in Warrington on two drug charges on 16 January 2025.

=== Health and death ===
Danan struggled with an addiction to vapes, cigarettes and cocaine. He said he experimented with ecstasy from the age of 14 and survived a heroin overdose in 2007. Danan said that he had been to rehab 17 times by 2022, and that he had spent "about £1 million on rehab and recovery" by then. In June 2024, Danan was hospitalised for respiratory failure caused by "obsessive" vape usage. He had to be given CPR by his family, before being admitted to ICU with pneumonia. Doctors warned him that if he continued smoking in any form, he risked being linked to an oxygen tank later in life.

On 15 January 2025, Avon and Somerset Police attended an address in Brislington, Bristol, where Danan was pronounced dead, aged 46. His death was announced the following day, with a statement from his management giving no cause of death and saying that no further comments would be made. His death was not treated as suspicious. Following the inquest into his death on the 11 March 2025, it was announced he had died from a cocktail of drugs with heroin, methadone, pregabalin, cocaine and zopiclone found in his system, with a secondary finding of benzodiazepine use.

== Filmography ==
Year	Title	Role	Notes
1997	The Knock	Gang Member	1 episode
1997–2001	Hollyoaks	Sol Patrick	Series regular
1999	TV Hits Awards	Himself	Guest; 1 episode
1999	Brookside: Double Take	Himself	Guest; 1 episode
2000	FBi	Himself	Guest; 1 episode
2001	A Question of TV	Himself	Guest; 1 episode
2001	Liquid News	Himself	Guest; 1 episode
2001, 2002	Night Fever	Himself	Guest; 2 episodes
2001	The Saturday Show	Himself	Guest; 1 episode
2002	Daddy’s Girl	Nathan	Television film
2002	The Basil Brush Show	Referee	Episode: "The Date"
2003	The Queens Nose	Max	3 episodes
2003	Adventure Inc.	Cedric	1 episode
2003	Casualty	Cedric	1 episode
2003	The Pilot Show	Himself	Guest; 1 episode
2003	Ten Minutes	Chris	Short film
2004	Football Challenge	Himself	Guest; 1 episode
2004	One Man and His Dog	Wayne	Film role
2005–2006	Celebrity Love Island	Himself	Contestant; series 1 & 2
2005–2006	Celebrity Love Island: Aftersun	Himself	Guest
2005	Death of Celebrity	Himself	Documentary
2005	Dick & Dom in da Bungalow	Himself	Guest; 1 episode
2005	Live at the Apollo	Himself	Audience member
2005	Britain and Ireland's Next Top Model	Himself	Guest; 1 episode
2005	Top of the Pops Reloaded	Himself	Guest; 1 episode
2006	Richard & Judy	Himself	Guest; 1 episode
2006	Test My Girlfriend	Himself	Guest; 1 episode
2006	Showbiz Poker	Himself	Guest; 1 episode
2006	The Sharon Osbourne Show	Himself	Guest; 1 episode
2006	The Charlotte Church Show	Himself	Guest; 1 episode
2006	Brainiac's Test Tube Baby	Himself	Guest; 1 episode
2006	Ant & Dec's Saturday Night Takeaway	Himself	Guest; 2 episodes
2008	Balls of Steel	Himself	Guest; 1 episode
2009	The Alan Titchmarsh Show	Himself	Guest; 1 episode
2009	The Justin Lee Collins Show	Himself	Guest; 1 episode
2009	The Kevin Bishop Show	Himself	Guest; 1 episode
2010	Celebrity Quitters	Himself	Participant
2010–2011	Stars and Strikes	Himself	Presenter
2012	Celebrity Come Dine with Me	Himself	Guest; 1 episode
2012	Celebrity Juice	Himself	Guest; 1 episode
2012	Crime Stories	Kevin Baker	1 episode
2014	Most Shocking Reality TV Moments	Himself	Documentary
2015	Good Girls Club	Steve	Main role
2016, 2017	Sam Delaney's News Thing	Himself	Guest; 7 episodes
2017	Amoc	DCI Collins	Film role
2017	Loose Women	Himself	Guest; 1 episode
2017	Celebrity Big Brother	Himself	Housemate; series 20
2017	When Reality TV Goes Horribly Wrong	Himself	Documentary
2017	Most Shocking Celebrity Moments 2017	Himself	Guest; 1 episode
2017	The Story of Reality TV	Himself	Guest; 1 episode
2019	Are We Dead Yet	Gavin	Film role
2019	Judge Romesh	Himself	Guest; 1 episode
2019	When Soap Stars Go Horribly Wrong	Himself	Documentary
2020	Doll House	Andy	Film role
2021	The B@it	Himself	Episode: "Is Xmas Offensive?"
2021	The Gift Musical	Washy	Episode: "Is Xmas Offensive?"
2021	At Home with Hayley	Himself	Guest; 2 episodes
2022	Celebrity Coach Trip	Himself	Contestant; series 7
2022	Farage	Himself	Guest; 1 episode
2025	Bloody Love	Brian	Posthumous

== Awards and nominations ==
Year	Association	Category	Work	Result	Reference
1999	Inside Soap Awards	Best Actor	Hollyoaks	Nominated	
2006	Loaded Laftas Comedy Awards	Funniest TV Reality Person	—N/a	Won	
