= The Bill series 17 =

The Bill
- Series 17
- No. of episodes: 92

Release
- Original network: ITV
- Original release: 5 January – 21 December 2001

Series chronology
- ← Previous; Series 16 Next → Series 18

Series 17 of British television drama The Bill consists of 92 episodes, broadcast between 5 January and 21 December 2001.

As well as 85 regular episodes, the series also included a spinoff Beech is Back, following a special 90-minute episode in Australia. The story follows ex-Sun Hill officer Claire Stanton, now a DI, as she goes to Australia to try to extradite ex-DS Don Beech for the murder of his colleague John Boulton. The spinoff that follows concludes the Beech storyline, which began in Series 16.

On 14 August 2013, The Bill Series 17 Part 1 and 2 and The Bill Series 17 Part 3 and 4 DVD sets were released in Australia.

== Storylines ==
Although the idea of making the series into a serial drama did not fully take effect until April 2002, many of the stories in the latter half of the year were multi-part stories, some containing up to six episodes, such as the "Night Games" saga. The two-part episode "Lifelines" is the last two-parter to feature in the series until the return of episode titles in 2007. The series saw an exit for Sergeant Bob Cryer, with actor Eric Richard controversially axed after 17 years with the show. His exit storyline saw him accidentally shot by PC Dale Smith, who transferred to SO19 as part of his exit storyline; however, he would return two years later; Cryer would also return for a series of guest roles between 2002 and 2004. Former Brookside actor Paul Usher also joined the show on a permanent basis, playing PC Des Taviner, who would go on to be one of the show's most famous characters.

Producers used several plots in the series to focus on the mass of new characters introduced in series 16; DS Debbie McAllister and DC Paul Riley went head-to-head as McAllister fell for an informant who gave info against Riley's brother, and the eventual death of McAllister's informant led to a storyline that dominated the early proceedings of the series. DS Vik Singh also took centre stage in an undercover storyline, while DC Kate Spears became a key character in the autumn; after an affair with new station commander Tom Chandler, a storyline which resumed in series 18, she was subject to an attempted rape by a fellow police officer. Chandler also had a series of notable moments including a corruption allegation and his unsuccessful quest to succeed Guy Mannion as Borough Commander, as well as coming under fire from DC Mickey Webb after the death of a friend of Webb's during the four-part Britanniamania storyline.

== Cast changes ==
=== Arrivals ===
- Sgt Craig Gilmore (Episode 26–)
- PC Des Taviner (Episode 33–)
- SC Terry Knowles (Episode 90–)

=== Departures ===
- Sgt Bob Cryer – Retires after being accidentally shot by PC Smith
- PC Dale Smith – Transfers to SO19 (temporary departure)
- PC Vicky Hagen – Transfers to Essex Police
- Chief Supt Guy Mannion – Moves on
- PC Roz Clarke – Resigns from the force after finding the job too difficult

== Episodes ==
#	Title	Episode notes	Directed by	Written by	Original air date
1	"Appropriate Action"	John McArdle and Matt Healy guest star	Ed Fraiman	Paul Finch	5 January 2001
Cryer, acting duty officer in the absence of Monroe, takes over two cases involving teenagers from the same school: the assault on known robber Shaun Cafferty and the disappearance of a girl called Lisa McKane. A local "photographer", Andrew Morton, comes under Cryer's suspicions after revealing that he has an obsession with Lisa and her friends. He is later arrested when Harker spots him acting suspiciously by the canal, looking for something beneath a pile of rubbish. The cases collide when Cafferty is found with a close friend of Lisa, who reveals Lisa has been hiding out at her house the whole time. Angry and upset, Cryer is shocked when he realises Lisa's father is taking the law into his own hands by planning to kill Morton.
2	"Criminal Practice"	Clodagh Rodgers and Tristan Sturrock guest star	Peter Cregeen	J. C. Wilsher	9 January 2001
Webb and Riley wait outside a café, while inside McAllister is conducting a rather clumsy undercover sting on a suspected drug dealer. Cullen is furious when the suspect is released without charge following McAllister's poor handling of the case. Resentful of Singh's success in recruiting local informants, McAllister manages to coax some information from solicitor's clerk Jamie Ross, which eventually leads to a successful arrest when information from Ross blows apart a stabbing suspect's alibi. Pleased with her success, McAllister is determined to convince Ross to work as an informant for her. Meanwhile, Riley meets his brother Joe, who seems to be in some trouble with Nottinghamshire Police.
3	"Upon Information Received"	Tristan Sturrock guest stars	Peter Cregeen	Simon Sharkey	12 January 2001
CID investigate a spate of car thefts, and McAllister's informant Jamie Ross gives her a tip-off about a gang of French car thieves working in the area. Ross is unable to name his anonymous contact, who turns out to be Riley's brother Joe, who had unknowingly sublet his lock-up to the gang. During a sting operation set up by McAllister, four members of the gang are arrested, but during their bail hearing, they are broken out of Canley Magistrates' Court by a trio armed with shotguns. An SO19 raid on Joe's lock-up sees the gang once again arrested before they manage to skip the country, but Riley must work hard to hide his brother's involvement, particularly as Ross informs McAllister that Joe's involvement goes much deeper than Riley thinks.
4	"No Victim"	Zienia Merton guest stars	Graeme Harper	Andy Armitage	16 January 2001
Worrell and Quinnan attend to a woman threatening to jump off a bridge. She turns out to be Sarah Collins, the wife of DS Terry Collins from Stafford Row CID. Despite the doubts of some of her colleagues, Worrell is determined to pursue the matter as a domestic violence case. She convinces Sarah to make a statement and testify in court by telling Sarah of her own experience with domestic violence. The case is dismissed, however, when Sarah becomes reluctant to testify, and there are doubts about her character. Worrell is horrified when she finds herself subject to an official complaint, but is left questioning her own judgement when events at the Collins home take a shocking turn. Meanwhile, Quinnan struggles to find the right time to tell his wife about his affair with Page, with matters not helped when Stamp confesses he knows about it.
5	"Common Language"	Harry Towb and Elina Löwensohn guest star	Tania Diez	Nigel Baldwin	19 January 2001
A young Russian girl leads Smith out of a nightclub, where he is promptly attacked by three men. An innocent bystander attempts to prevent the attack but is himself badly injured. Chandler assigns Cullen to investigate the assault. They track down the Russian girl, Natasha Ivanova, through a language school, which seems to be recruiting students to work as prostitutes. Natasha is desperate as her visa is about to expire, and her sister has disappeared without trace. When her sister is found murdered, Smith realises the men responsible for her death and his assault are linked to a colleague from his old army unit, and goes all-out to discover why someone would want to have him beaten up.
6	"PC Smith"	Harry Towb and Nick Patrick guest star	Tania Diez	Chris McWaters	23 January 2001
Hoping it will convince Chandler to endorse his transfer to SO19, Smith volunteers with Klein to "babysit" Clive Allen, the victim of a sexually motivated assault, who is reluctantly testifying against his assailant, Gary Cook, in court the next day. Smith nearly blows it when his angry reaction to teasing from Clive's partner Ian Jones causes Jones to run off, and he is subsequently attacked. Allen subsequently refuses to testify, with Smith tasked with convincing him otherwise. When Allen agrees to go to court and seals a conviction for Cook, his partner in crime Paul Taylor threatens to get revenge. When Allen reports Jones missing, Smith and Klein are horrified when a call comes in about man with multiple stab wounds in the same place Allen was assaulted.
7	"Family Honour"	Michele Austin guest stars	Jo Shoop	Kathrine Smith	26 January 2001
A petrol bomb attack cuts short a talk by Chandler at a community meeting on the Larkmead Estate, an attempt to improve police relations with the residents. Meanwhile, Ackland is called to the house of local MP Stephen Hadley and his wife Fiona, where their infant child has died of serious injuries. Forensic examination reveals the baby was thrown to the floor, and Fiona claims her husband was responsible. Stephen is arrested, but denies Fiona's claim. A lack of evidence sees him released, but he is subsequently arrested again for attacking his wife when he returns home. After constant finger-pointing and pressure from Chandler to not leak too much to the press, Ackland is left in a difficult position when she finds out who was responsible for the baby's death.
8	"Words of Wisdom"	Michele Austin guest stars	Jo Shoop	Marc Pye	30 January 2001
After an ear-bending from Marsha Harris, Chandler is determined to bring to an end the one-boy crime wave on the Larkmead Estate caused by resident hooligan Peter Rogers. Chandler persuades Ackland to talk to Peter's mother, and also tries to get Marsha Harris's daughter Cassie to make a statement to the police against Rogers, but both are too scared of the boy to comply. When Cassie Harris is found half-drowned in a river, and Stamp and Hollis turn up a CCTV tape of Rogers smashing up cars, it seems they may be able to put him away at last, but is all as it seems?
9	"Out of the Frying Pan"	Tristan Sturrock guest stars	Baz Taylor	Simon Sharkey	2 February 2001
McAllister continues to get useful tip offs from her informant and lover, Jamie Ross, including information regarding a planned armed robbery on a betting shop. Meanwhile, Riley's brother Joe finds himself in the middle of a brewing turf war in Sun Hill, as he attempts to gain ground with his new hot dog vending business, much to Riley's dismay. Unaware that there are some very nasty players on the patch, Joe finds himself making many enemies, and when his lockup is set on fire and several of his vendors attacked, he has no choice but to reach out to his brother for help. Hollis and Hayward join Riley under cover as Joe's hot dog vendors in order to catch those responsible for the attacks.
10	"Mexican Stand-Off"	Tristan Sturrock guest stars	Baz Taylor	Simon Sharkey	6 February 2001
McAllister, acting on a tip off from Ross, offers Cullen information about a plan to intimidate witnesses in a high-profile court case. However, when Ross refuses to give up any further information, McAllister tapes a privileged conversation between Ross and his client, who admits on-tape to torching the home of the main witness in the court case. When Ross makes an official complaint McAllister, she turns to Riley for help, and threatens to expose his cover-up of his brother's involvement with the French car gang, unless he backs her up and says that he was present at all her meetings with Ross. Unaware that she has pushed her lover too far, McAllister goes all out to save her informant.
11	"Cruise Control"	John Duttine guest stars	Jo Johnson	Chris Fewtrell	9 February 2001
Webb poses as a rent-boy in Eddington Park, a well-known gay beat in Sun Hill, as he and Lennox investigate a series of brutal attacks on gay men in the area. A car alarm alerts Webb and Lennox to the car of a local MLA parked in the bushes. When questioned, the MLA claims he was car-jacked and certainly was not cruising in the park. He threatens legal action against the station, and Chandler moves quickly to prevent further damage to Sun Hill's reputation. A helpful security guard offers the police an observation post in a nearby office building, but Webb becomes suspicious of the guard's attitude.
12	"Real Crime"	—	Graeme Harper	Phillip Gladwin	13 February 2001
Harker and Klein find a naked woman, Lisa Hayes, in a garden. She claims that her husband, Neil, hit her and locked her out. Spears takes a particular interest in the case as Chandler has asked her to compile a paper on domestic violence. Meanwhile, Webb is investigating an attack on a lorry driver whose vanload of duty free was stolen following a trip to France. When Neil is later caught on video trying to break into where Lisa is staying, Webb notices crates of French booze in the back of his van. He is convinced Neil will lead them to the gang, and requests that he is bailed. Spears' sympathy for the victim starts to wear thin when she refuses to press charges and begins to harass her at work.
13	"Home and Away"	Final credited appearance of DC Tom Baker	Ken Hannam	Mark Holloway	16 February 2001
Quinnan and Page attend a call to a suspected burglary, and find the occupier, Mrs Hoyle, who is deaf and blind, tied up in the wardrobe. Chandler is outraged when he finds out about the burglary in the local paper rather than from CID. Accompanied by a newspaper reporter, uniform raid the flat of Mick Corcoran, the prime suspect for the burglary. When he makes a run for it, he is cornered by Quinnan and Page. When he attacks Page, Quinnan goes berserk and hits him repeatedly with his ASP. Things look bleak for Quinnan when Corcoran starts convulsing, and he is forced to convince Monroe that is capable of the job. An ill-fated trip to a dance ball arranged by Boyden goes wrong, with comments made by Stamp making Jenny realise her husband is hiding something.
14	"Going Under"	New title sequence and theme introduced; final appearance of Nurse Jenny Delaney; Paul Popplewell guest stars	Ken Hannam	Richard Stoneman	20 February 2001
After his affair is blown by Stamp, Quinnan arrives home and has police called to his house during a domestic with Jenny. When the police leave they argue, and Quinnan tries to convince Jenny not to leave him. When he shows up late, Boyden stirs the pot by pairing him with Stamp, while Page goes out with Hagen. As Quinnan responds to a call, he sees Jenny on a bus, and when he calls her she says she is going back to Ireland. Distracted by the breakdown of his marriage, he fails to reach Stamp in time and he is left assaulted. Quinnan then goes after the attackers off duty, and investigating officer Webb later gets an anonymous call regarding the whereabouts of the gang, who are found badly beaten.
15	"Faultline"	Temporary departure of PC Dave Quinnan	John Davies	Alison Fisher	23 February 2001
Quinnan stands and watches as a shopkeeper and a young woman are attacked by a gang of thugs in his local corner shop. When he finally turns up at the station, he identifies the leader of the gang as Robbie Gaitskill. Page turns up in tears, and she and the rest of the relief are concerned, as Quinnan seems to be cracking up. The crackheads arrested the previous night identify Quinnan as the policeman who attacked them. As Hagen and Page try to find him, Quinnan goes AWOL and tracks down the woman from the shop, Tricia Martin, and demands she tell him Gaitskill's address. However, when Gaitskill shows up, Quinnan's uniform colleagues race to the rescue to stop a depressed Quinnan doing something reckless.
16	"Long Shadows"	Lisa Maxwell, Michael Elphick and Shaun Prendergast guest star	Gwennan Sage	Maxwell Young	2 March 2001
17	"Long Shadows"	Lisa Maxwell, Michael Elphick and Shaun Prendergast guest star	Gwennan Sage	Maxwell Young	6 March 2001
Part One: When Lennox is accused of planting evidence in an armed robbery case, Meadows is determined to prove his innocence, and to find evidence to charge the suspect's accomplice, Phil Brown. Unfortunately, Brown claims to have been an informant for former Sun Hill alumni Don Beech, which makes Chandler determined to drop the case at all costs. When an old friend of Meadows' reveals that George Stubbs had previously bribed Chandler's DS at Park Rise, Meadows realises he has some ammunition against Chandler, and uses it to gain the leverage he requires on Brown. Meanwhile, Boyden and Hagen help Clarke recover her ASP when it is stolen during the pursuit of a robbery suspect. Part Two: Under pressure from Chandler and the NCS to release Phil Brown, Meadows convinces Moira Scott to admit to George Stubbs's involvement in the armed robbery, as well as drug dealing. Meanwhile, Spears goes undercover as a cocaine buyer, and with some help from NCS and SO19, they catch Stubbs and his supplier red-handed with the drugs. During his interview, Stubbs makes an allegation of corruption against Chandler. Meadows realises that his allegations could be the final nail in Chandler's coffin, and goes all out to substantiate Stubbs' claim. Notes: Lisa Maxwell would join the cast as DS, later DI, Samantha Nixon in 2002.
18	"Higher Power"	Sara Stockbridge and Ian Burfield guest star	John Davies	Marcus Brent	9 March 2001
Carver attends to a drug dealer who is found badly beaten on the Larkmead Estate, but finds himself in a dilemma when one of his friends from his alcoholics anonymous group, Ossie, confesses to the crime. Suspicious of his motives, McAllister follows Carver when he tries to convince his friend to turn himself in, but to Carver's horror, Ossie is arrested shortly after by McAllister. Carver realises that Ossie had suffered an alcoholic blackout at the time, and that the real beating was committed by a rival drug dealer on the Larkmead. As he goes all out to clear Ossie's name, the rest of the relief are forced to contend with the BIC gang, a group of youths who are harassing local shopkeepers.
19	"Touched By Evil"	Tom Chadbon and Stafford Gordon guest star	Ken Grieve	Ron Rose	16 March 2001
Clarke is delighted when her attachment to CID is approved by Monroe, but is soon forced to endure the use wisecracks from both the relief and the rest of CID. She and Glaze are tasked with investigating a series of break-ins. A connection has yet to have been established, and Glaze is no further forward with leads. When Clarke realises that the break-ins are all connected by surname, she and Glaze manage to find a prime suspect. Meanwhile, Conway and Cullen attend a rugby match between the Met and the Army, but events soon turn sour when Conway is abducted by a disgruntled soldier decides to take revenge on those responsible for the abuse he received while he was in a children's home.
20	"The Leopard"	First use of the new ITV end credits; Harry Towb, John Cater and Ray Lonnen guest star	John Dower	Stephen Plaice	20 March 2001
21	"The Leopard"	First use of the new ITV end credits; Harry Towb, John Cater and Ray Lonnen guest star	John Dower	Stephen Plaice	23 March 2001
Part One: Smith and Klein attend to Mr Kennedy, whose house and garden shed have been attacked by vandals repeatedly over the past few weeks. When Kennedy threatens to take matters into his own hands, Smith casually comments that he wouldn't blame him if he did. Smith and Klein both apply for new jobs; Smith submits his application to SO19, and Chandler wants Klein to take the position of partnership officer at the Town Hall. When Kennedy shoots a young boy, and insists that Smith told him to do so, Klein reluctantly confirms what was said. Smith puts his career and transfer at risk when he accuses Klein of grassing him up before savagely assaulting him in the station corridor. Part Two: Smith, suspended for his assault on Klein, sets out to save his career. Klein is offered the position of partnership officer, but he is shunned by the relief, who think he grassed Smith up to get the job. Cryer works both sides and decides to do some digging into Kennedy, and he encourages Smith to do the same. With Klein's help, Smith infiltrates the gang of youths intimidating the local residents, and discovers that the real estate firm Mather and Devine is indeed behind the harassment. Cryer makes a breakthrough in the case that could rescue Smith, while he gets closer to uncovering the scam with his off the books undercover op.
22	"Tolerance"	Juliet Cadzow guest stars	Alan Macmillan	Phil Ford	27 March 2001
23	"Tolerance"	Juliet Cadzow guest stars	Alan Macmillan	Phil Ford	30 March 2001
Part One: Cryer, approaching his 30th year of service, finds Chandler doubting he is still up to the job. As a test he assigns Cryer the difficult task of resolving a situation where a group of prostitutes are at loggerheads with a local residents group led by Councillor Angela Morris. Cryer suggests a "zone of tolerance", a non-residential area where the prostitutes can work without upsetting the locals, and manages to convince the girls to give it a try. Just as events get under control, an incident puts Cryer back to zero. Meanwhile, Smith heads to New Scotland Yard for his interview with SO19, and befriends PC Julie Stanley. After successful interviews, the pair prepare for an intense training regime. Part Two: Cryer investigates the arson attack on the home of Councillor Morris. Cryer questions the alibi of her husband Justin when a local prostitute alleges she saw Justin with another tom called Cath Evans, who turns up badly beaten. Justin admits his indiscretion to his wife but denies assaulting Evans, but then points the finger at Mandy, Cryer's informant. However, Cryer can't shake the suspicion that long-time target and suspected pimp Jamie Fleet may be responsible for both the assault and the arson attack.
24	"Promised Land"	Ray Lonnen, Tony Selby and Kate Magowan guest star	Chris Lovett	Chris Ould	3 April 2001
Klein becomes personally involved when a group of Kosovan refugees housed at a council estate are harassed and attacked. Later, at a family gathering, Klein's cousin Jerry arrives and is praised by the family for his success. Meanwhile, Webb investigates a robbery at a clothing factory, and his investigations lead him to Norman Klein, his colleague's uncle. The link between the latest robbery and a previous one is revealed to be Jerry Klein, who assessed the security at both premises. When Jerry is found badly beaten, Klein decides he must tell the police about his cousin's possible involvement, which in turn results in Cullen catching the gang on their third operation.
25	"Return of the Hunter"	Liza Walker guest stars	Ed Fraiman	Stephen Plaice	6 April 2001
Cryer and Hayward attend an incident at a local school where an angry divorcee, Chris Finnessey, is demanding to see his son. When the boy's teacher warns the police of Finnessey's violent reputation and a possible restraining order against him, he grabs a knife and takes the teacher and Cryer hostage. Faced with an armed suspect and two hostages, Chandler calls in SO19, although the only Trojan unit available is that of the newly qualified Smith and Stanley. When Finnessey and his son leave the school building, Chandler gives authorisation to fire; Smith shoots first, but, to his horror, hits the wrong man.
26	"Tour of Duty"	First appearance of Sgt Craig Gilmore	Albert Barber	Stuart Blackburn	10 April 2001
Ackland visits Cryer in hospital as he recovers from his shooting at the hands of Smith, and is horrified to find that he doesn't know he has already been replaced at Sun Hill. His replacement is Craig Gilmore, who has transferred down from Manchester Police, and who wastes no time in telling the relief that the rumours are true: he is gay. Meanwhile, Lennox investigates the harassment of a local publican by a gang of youths, but when Gilmore organises a 'beat sweep' of the local estates, they find the publican's daughter is involved with the gang and is feeding them information on the police raids. Her information leads the relief to an illegal drinking club. As the relief arrest the gang members, one of them accuses Harker of brutality.
27	"Lies of Silence"	Guest appearance of Liz Rawton	Ron Bain	Derek Lister	13 April 2001
On temporary assignment to the Serious Crime Group, Lennox is surprised to find Liz Rawton is now an Acting DI at SCG. The body of a young girl, later identified as Hayley Spence, is found in a concrete slab in a cement works. Rawton and Lennox question the new owner of the cement works, Digby Leake, and Rawton tells Lennox off for his aggressive approach to the case. Hayley's ex-boyfriend tells them of a modelling agency, which doubled as an escort service, where Hayley worked. He also reveals that Hayley was pregnant, and the owner of the agency, Leon Walsh, may be the father. When Lennox finds a car containing Hayley's blood, forensics drop a major bombshell that blows the inquiry wide open.
28	"Over the Hill"	Brooke Kinsella, Preeya Kalidas and Aidan J. David guest stars	Michael Owen Morris	Henrietta Hardy	17 April 2001
It's Boyden's 40th birthday, and to make matters worse, he has to cancel a date to attend an outward pursuit weekend with Hagen and a group of wayward teenagers. CID investigate the serious bashing of an elderly man, and their prime suspect is Jason Wyatt, who had attacked the same man some months previously. Jason is one of the group with Boyden and Hagen, and his aggressive personality causes several arguments and fights over the weekend. Boyden forms a bond with the boy, though, and suspects Jason's abusive father had more to do with the attack. Forensics prove him right, but Boyden hears bad news that shatters young Jason.
29	"Head Over Heels"	—	Albert Barber	Ed Jones	20 April 2001
Stamp joins a dating agency for professional people, telling them he is an antiques dealer, and, as he is living in the section house, gives them Page's address. A CID operation involving forged banknotes goes wrong and Gilmore reprimands Stamp and Hayward when they pursue and arrest an armed suspect without backup. Webb and Spears investigate a series of robberies and discover a link to Stamp's dating agency. As he tries to keep his involvement undiscovered, CID discover Stamp's date Lisa invites men to stay at her flat and then arranges for their houses to be burgled, so CID set up surveillance outside Page's house.
30	"Hitting Home"	Final regular appearance of Bob Cryer as Sgt, departure of Dale Smith as PC; Ray Lonnen guest stars	Ed Fraiman	Jim Davies	24 April 2001
The relief plan a farewell party for Cryer, but he is reluctant to go, so Conway pays him a visit. The police inquiry clears Smith of charges relating to Cryer's shooting, although his probation period is extended. Meanwhile, Worrell and Clarke attend an apparent non-starter when a series of break-ins occur at the house of a hippy couple; however, it is eventually revealed a valuable necklace has been stolen. Elsewhere, Klein and Hayward are called when a strange young woman accuses her neighbour of torturing her elderly mother. When the old woman disappears, it appears she was taken by her son who is wanted for parole violation in Manchester. Cryer stuns the relief by turning up for his leaving do with Smith in tow.
31	"Value Judgement"	—	Michael Owen Morris	Julian Spilsbury	27 April 2001
When a man matching the description of a local paedophile is found outside a school, Hollis witnesses an apparent abduction. The abducted boy is found at his mother's house, but Boyden's curiosity is piqued when he discovers the mother is in a relationship with local villain Shane Weller. The witness who tried to stop the 'abduction' is revealed as the boy's biological father Marek Gocek. When the boy goes missing again, they go in search of Marek, not realising Weller's thugs are also in pursuit. Meanwhile, Hagen is mortified when she first has a minor PolAcc trying to stop a suspect in the abduction, and her career as a driver is plunged into doubt when she has another hours later.
32	"Collateral Damage"	Jenny McCracken and Tristan Sturrock guest star	Ken Grieve	J.C. Wilsher	1 May 2001
McAllister is surprised to run into her former lover and informant Jamie Ross in a bar, when he returns to Sun Hill after revealing the man who wanted him dead has died of a heart attack. Ross is in a new line of work: organising adventure holidays – but he still has plenty of inside knowledge, and when he and McAllister resume their relationship, he reveals information on the man responsible for a hit-and-run on a drug dealer and a schoolgirl. To McAllister's horror, she realises that Ross has used her, as he is deeply in debt to Brett Sadler, the man who ordered the drug dealer to be killed. Cullen convinces Ross to help them catch Sadler, but he is put in unexpected risk.
33	"A Week of Nights"	First appearance of PC Des Taviner; Elizabeth Berrington, Mark Monero and Mona Hammond guest star	Michael Ferguson	Len Collin	4 May 2001
34	"A Week of Nights"	First appearance of PC Des Taviner; Elizabeth Berrington, Mark Monero and Mona Hammond guest star	Michael Ferguson	Len Collin	8 May 2001
Part One: New Area Car driver Des Taviner makes an instant impression on the relief when he starts work on the night shift at Sun Hill, with his no-nonsense attitude and sharp wit impressing the likes of Page and Hayward; however, Stamp is wary of his rival's methods, having briefly worked with Taviner while on secondment to the Robbery Squad. Taviner is paired with Worrell, but soon demands she be taken off the role as Area Car operator, saying she is "clueless". Paired with Hollis, Taviner uses his colleague's experience and knowledge to learn the lay of the land. However, Hollis is later left doubting his new partner when Taviner chats up two girls waiting for the night bus, offering them a lift home. Two drunk girls from a hen party brought in by Stamp and Hayward give Glaze an unexpected break in a series of rapes on the Jasmine Allen estate, but it come too late to stop another attack when residents report a woman screaming on Canley Fields, leading to the entire night shift racing to the scene to track the woman down. Part Two: McAllister and Glaze are certain they've got their man for the Jasmine Allen rapes: Lenworth Lomanu, a convicted rapist who was seen by Klein and Stamp in the vicinity at the same time Lynn Roberts was attacked. Taviner is not so sure, and he suspects that the young man he and Worrell questioned outside a pharmacy before it was robbed is responsible. As Taviner and Hollis do their own investigation, Lomanu's arrest causes a near riot on the Jasmine Allen, and Gilmore is attacked when he returns two housewives arrested for obstruction back to the estate. Taviner gets his man, Conrad James, but his solicitor gets him off the hook. Clear evidence that Conrad is dealing drugs gives Taviner a second chance and the opportunity to raid his house.
35	"Wednesday"	Charles De'Ath guest stars	Susan Tully	Jim Guthrie	11 May 2001
Klein and Taviner arrest two men fighting in the street. Glaze is surprised to see one of the men is his old school friend, Lol Redman. He is even more surprised when Redman is charged with racial assault against the other man, Devon Russell. Redman is bailed, and Glaze arranges to meet him in the pub later. As Glaze waits, Redman is arrested again outside Russell's house, and Russell claims to have a tape of Redman's verbal abuse. McAllister visits Russell's wife while he makes a statement, and she admits that she and Redman had an affair, admitting that her husband is a violent and paranoid man. Redman admits he was concerned for the safety of Russell's wife, not realising he is at risk himself.
36	"Billy the Kid"	Alison Pargeter guest stars	Ged Maguire	Nigel Baldwin	15 May 2001
A ten-year-old boy who calls himself "Billy the Kid" is arrested twice in one day, and when Boyden speaks to him, he reveals he wanted to about his sister Katie, who is being used as an underage prostitute by her stepfather in a blackmail scam. DI Jane Edmonds from SCG, the ex-wife of an old friend of Boyden's, arrives to investigate the scam,. When Billy is hit by a car, he is abducted from St Hugh's hospital by Kate and their stepfather Tom Adams, who is behind the blackmail and whom Kate is besotted with. Edmonds is all for arresting Adams when they use one of the previous victims in a sting operation, but Boyden risks letting him go so he will lead them to the missing kids.
37	"Still Crazy"	Return of PC Dave Quinnan	Susan Tully	Richard Stoneman	18 May 2001
Quinnan returns to duty and is determined to prove to everyone that he's back to normal after his breakdown. Out in a panda car, Quinnan sees a man shot in the head in a van in a pub cark park. He calls for assistance, but by the time reinforcements arrive, the victim, the van and the main witness have disappeared. Desperate to prove his sanity, Quinnan pursues the case vigorously, and enlists the help of Riley's brother Joe as an unofficial informant. When Joe asks the wrong people the wrong questions, he and Paul finds themselves on the receiving end of a nasty beating. Meanwhile, Page is outraged by a practical joke played by Taviner, but she and Quinnan get their revenge in a most amusing way.
38	"Complicity"	Russell Tovey guest stars	Bruce McDonald	Nicholas McInerny and Tanika Gupta	25 May 2001
39	"Complicity"	Russell Tovey guest stars	Bruce McDonald	Nicholas McInerny and Tanika Gupta	1 June 2001
Part One: Singh goes undercover at a 'car cruise', where he becomes involved with a well-organised car ringing gang led by Kevin North, in order to gather information on a scam involving stolen cars, of which leads are very few and far between. Meanwhile, Webb tries to cultivate an unofficial 15-year-old snout named Tyro Shaw, in the hope that he will grass up his father, Steve Shaw, an old nemesis who has a list of previous convictions. Singh poses as a car thief, and is soon initiated with the gang, even gaining a meeting with North's boss, Jennifer Salter. As Webb gets frustrated by Shaw's dead-end leads, Singh discovers he is working with the gang and pushes him too far about his involvement. Part Two: Tyro Shaw threatens to blow Singh's cover in the car-ringing gang, but is convinced otherwise by Webb. Meanwhile, Singh seems to have impressed both Kevin North and his boss, Jennifer Salter, who seems quite taken with him. After a passionate encounter, Salter tells Singh the gang are moving on to Manchester, after North suspects something suspicious is going on. Singh realises he must gather the evidence he needs to convict the gang in North's office, but as he enters the office he is abducted by North and Salter. Webb discovers Shaw blew Singh's cover and is left needing to convince him to tell them where Singh has been taken.
40	"Suffer the Little Children"	Alex Norton, Lee Boardman and Rosie Cavaliero guest star	Ron Bain	Paul Powell	8 June 2001
Cullen leads an unsuccessful drugs raid on a warehouse owned by his old nemesis, Terry Barlow. Cullen is furious with Glaze, whose snout tipped them off about drugs on the premises. Harker and Rickman deal with a domestic case involving an argumentative couple, the Carters, and their baby. Neither case makes any progress until a neighbour reports that Barlow has been to visit the Carters on several occasions. Determined to get one up on CID, Harker puts the pieces together and comes up with a theory that the Carters are putting their baby up for sale on the Guatemalan black market with the help of a doctor at St Hugh's, and Barlow is the broker. Despite warnings from Glaze, Harker presses on.
41	"Happy and Glorious"	Lorraine Stanley and Tessa Peake-Jones guest star	Rob Bailey	Mark Holloway	15 June 2001
42	"Happy and Glorious"	Lorraine Stanley and Tessa Peake-Jones guest star	Rob Bailey	Mark Holloway	15 June 2001
Part One: With the Section House closing, Hollis is not only looking for a new place to live, but is also applying for a transfer to SO14, the Royal Protection Unit. As he closes on a sale to buy a flat owned by an elderly friend, Doreen Tyler, she changes her mind at the last minute, so he moves in with Stamp. Hollis's intuition gives CID an important lead on a planned armed robbery, but his uniformed colleagues conspire against him to have Klein organise the Section House closing party instead of him. Upset that his colleagues no longer value his credibility, Hollis decides to skip the party and goes round to visit Doreen, only to find her lying on her living room floor with head injuries. Part Two: When Doreen Tyler dies of her injuries, Hollis is named as the prime suspect for her murder, leading to a suspension from duty and breakdown of his hopes to transfer to SO14. While CID try to trace the victim's long lost daughter, with little to no information, Stamp and Klein try to find an alibi for Hollis. They interview a witness outside of Doreen's house, who claims that he saw Hollis hanging around the property more than hour before he stated that he arrived. With the evidence mounting, Stamp and Klein's only hope of clearing Hollis' name lies with a tom. Meanwhile, a scam involving Tyler's 'long-lost daughter' comes to light, which the Sun Hill team hope will clear Hollis.
43	"Gun Crazy"	Sian Webber and Peter Halliday guest star	Richard Holthouse	Gregory Evans	19 June 2001
44	"Gun Crazy"	Sian Webber and Peter Halliday guest star	Richard Holthouse	Gregory Evans	22 June 2001
Part One: Chandler takes a personal interest in the case of a shooting at an off-license. When he confides his reasons to a young woman who was threatened by the gunman, he is horrified to find she was a journalist, and the story is published in the Sun Hill Gazette. Feeling unappreciated in the job, Meadows considers other options, and attempts to smooth things over with his long-suffering wife, Laura. Meadows teams up with McAllister and the two of them strike out on their own. After a few close calls, they arrest their prime suspect, a motor mechanic named Alan Merrick, who has a history of firearms offences. As they interview him, however, the gunman strikes again. Part Two: Chandler and Cullen are left dismayed when Meadows and McAllister release their prime suspect, Alan Merrick. Meanwhile, Lennox receives a call from the Army, informing them of another possible suspect, a recent deserter named Jason Starr. As Meadows and the team capture Starr following a stakeout on the Larkmead estate, McAllister and reporter Andrea Roper are taken hostage by Merrick and Matty Fletcher after investigating the contents of Merrick's basement.
45	"The Jury's Out"	Barry Jackson and T. P. McKenna guest star	Graham Moore	Arthur Ellis	26 June 2001
After a minor car accident in the High Street, Carver breathalyses an elderly man, but takes sympathy on him and allows him to leave in a taxi. The man turns out to be Hugh Alexander, a High Court judge with a renowned pro-police stance, and Carver finds himself suspected of showing bias, particularly when the other man involved in the accident threatens legal action against the Met. At the trial of a man accused of murdering a police officer, Worrell feels marginalised as a black officer when she is asked to testify and be a character witness for the dead officer. Conway meets Gary Fablon, and after discovering that he is addicted to litigation, Conway suspects he caused the crash.
46	"Lick of Paint"	Mary Tamm, Ashley Walters and Paul Antony-Barber guest star	Ged Maguire	Geoff Lindsay	29 June 2001
A spate of graffiti taggings in Sun Hill sees the police showing zero tolerance to the perpetrators. Carver is sympathetic towards an alcoholic teacher at Canley Art College when his classroom and students' work are defaced. Boyden asks Hagen to move in with him, but she is reluctant, wanting her own space. To her outrage, Boyden moves her belongings to his house as a surprise. Boyden arranges for the council to paint a wall blank to set a trap for the graffitists, catching quite a few in the process. However, with all them pleading innocence for the art school incident, they are left looking elsewhere.
47	"Temptation"	Richard Hope and Daniel Mays guest star	Graeme Harper	Ed Jones	3 July 2001
Clarke, who has been working double shifts all week, goes behind Ackland's back to get some more overtime from Boyden as she is desperately in debt. Taviner promises her some time in the Area Car, much to Hollis's annoyance. Taviner and Clarke interview Warren Debdale, a student who was brutally beaten, but he insists he didn't know the perpetrators. His father suspects the boy's friends are involved, but Glaze discovers the father is being blackmailed by a drug smuggling gang. Assigned to watch Warren in the hospital, Clarke has a coffee with a nurse, and is horrified to find Warren missing when she returns. Clarke's flatmate then threatens to throw her out unless she pays the rent.
48	"Envy"	—	Graeme Harper	Neil Clarke	6 July 2001
Glaze is outraged when Clarke falls asleep on an obbo watching the Borrovitch brothers, who are suspected of running a protection racket. Taviner and Clarke then investigate the theft of stolen diggers on a building site. The main suspect is Mick Abbott, an occasional employee at the site, and when they visit him in the bus where he lives, his wife reacts angrily and attacks Clarke. Desperate to clear her debt, Clarke begins moonlighting in telesales at her flatmate's company. While out at a bar with her new co-workers, she spots the Borrovitch brothers, allowing Glaze to make a connection with the stolen diggers and German arms dealers, and a successful raid sees all the culprits behind bars. However, Clarke's joy at getting a result is shattered when she attends a fatal RTC.
49	"Greed"	Cindy O'Callaghan guest stars	Ken Grieve	Neil Clarke	10 July 2001
Clarke fails her probationer exams, and goes AWOL instead of returning to the station. A gang of thieves on rollerblades are rampant in Sun Hill, and their mobility makes it very difficult for the police to catch them. Taviner arrests a girl, Jackie Burns, at a skate park, but she insists she was just watching the skaters. As the skate gang gets more violent, animosity between Worrell and Clarke also grows fiercer, and the two come to blows in the corridor. A tearful Clarke admits her debt problem to Taviner. Scrutinising CCTV footage reveals Jackie's involvement with the gang; she phones them when a potential victim withdraws money from an ATM. Clarke discovers her telesales commission has fallen through.
50	"Redemption"	Patrick Cremin and Sam Loggin guest star	Ken Grieve	Stuart Blackburn and Debbie Jones	13 July 2001
Clarke unsuccessfully applies for a police loan. Taviner buys her a pushbike and suggests she sell her scooter, but she is far from impressed. Meanwhile, Carver and Rickman find a young boy, Gavin Billson, overdosed on drugs, and Glaze and Webb investigate some of the local dealers. When it turns out Gavin overdosed on diamorphine, and after several dead ends, suspicion falls on Dr Stuart Bremner, a doctor at St Hugh's, who is also the boyfriend of Clarke's friend Ruth. A review of the hospital's CCTV footage reveals Ruth herself sneaking into a storeroom, and Clarke is forced to arrest her best friend. When Ruth refuses to grass up her lover, Clarke finds herself in a very difficult position.
51	"The Dark Side"	Neil Fitzmaurice, Kate Lonergan and June Page guest star	John Howard Davies and Chris Lovett	Rod Lewis, Stephen Plaice and Manjit Singh	17 July 2001
52	"The Dark Side"	Neil Fitzmaurice, Kate Lonergan and June Page guest star	John Howard Davies and Chris Lovett	Rod Lewis, Stephen Plaice and Manjit Singh	20 July 2001
53	"The Dark Side"	Neil Fitzmaurice, Kate Lonergan and June Page guest star	John Howard Davies and Chris Lovett	Rod Lewis, Stephen Plaice and Manjit Singh	24 July 2001
Part One – The Dark Side: Hayward breaks down during an anti-drugs talk at a primary school while discussing his sister's death. While his sensitivity wins the trust of the pupils, it allows him and Klein to track down a local youth bully, "Red", who uses aggressive dogs to rob school children. They trace the dogs to the flat of drug-addicted prostitute Stacy Dodds, where a search uncovers a large stash of heroin. Dodds claims her pimp forced her to deal, leading Hayward and Klein to bypass protocol and search the pimp's boat, where they uncover even more drugs. Meanwhile, Hayward attends an art gallery opening with Clarke, where he suspects an old acquaintance is involved in drug dealing. Part Two – Angel Rooms: Hayward and Klein arrange to get their stories straight after a bag of heroin they uncovered on Benji Pullinger’s boat is accidentally destroyed. Meanwhile, Clarke ends up sleeping with a man known as "Phil the Pill", only to be surprised when he arrives at Sun Hill the next day as DC Phil Raven from the Drugs Squad. Raven and CID arrest Pullinger for intent to supply, but the missing bag of heroin is brought up during the interview, leading station gossip to target Klein. Hayward ultimately confesses the truth to Gilmore. Later, while at a nightclub with his new girlfriend, Fiona, Hayward spots Raven selling drugs and discovers he and Fiona are previous acquaintances. With Klein's help, Hayward attempts to set up a sting by offering to sell Raven the missing heroin using a decoy bag of baking soda. However, during their meeting in a car park, Raven turns the tables and arrests Hayward. Part Three – Paint it Black: After the sting operation is explained, Raven releases Hayward on the condition that he accompany him on his undercover activities, despite Chandler confining him to the station after news of the missing heroin leaks to the press. Meanwhile, Clarke faces disappointment when Raven abruptly ends their fling, and Klein begins to fear for Hayward’s stability as his friend relies heavily on the erratic officer. After witnessing Fiona taking drugs at a party, Hayward initially wonders if Raven's cynical worldview has merit. However, when Raven attempts to murder a wanted addict by giving him a lethal overdose, Hayward decides he has gone too far. Guided by Singh, Clarke and Stamp track the pair to the flat just as disgruntled dealer Curtis Cleaver arrives to settle a score with Raven, with the ensuing struggle ending in tragedy.
54	"Eye of the Lens"	Dean Lennox Kelly guest stars	Chris Lovett	Phillip Gladwin	31 July 2001
Chandler assigns Spears to a project involving CCTV cameras in the area. When a number of cameras are damaged, two youths who have threatened one of the operators, Pat Spencer, are suspected, but the culprit turns out to be Robert Slade, whom the youths call "weird". Spears discovers that Robert lives in community care, and in interview, he reveals that he thinks the cameras are specifically spying on him. Hollis finds a picture that Slade has taken of a shopping centre security guard, Tony Malone, being given an envelope by known robber Roger Franklin, who has recently been released from jail. Cullen assigns both Singh and Spears to find out how all these disparate players are involved in the operation.
55	"Another Country"	John Woodvine, Amelda Brown and Morris Perry guest star	John Howard Davies	Chris Ould	3 August 2001
While on foot patrol on the Jasmine Allen estate, Carver contends with an elderly man, Ronnie Atkins, who wants to deal with the local youths "his way". When Atkins's best friend, Len Harrap, is found having fallen from the top of the building, Carver suspects foul play and investigates further. Harrap's GP tells him that Len was recently suffering from post-traumatic stress disorder, and that he had served with British forces during the Korean War. When a man matching the description of the association secretary, Charles Barratt, is reported to have left Len's flat, Atkins realises what has happened. Carver's investigation leads him to discover the cover-up of possible war crimes.
56	"Britanniamania"	Karl Howman guest stars	Brian Parker and Frank W. Smith	Len Collin, Steve Hawes and Scott Cherry	7 August 2001
57	"Britanniamania"	Karl Howman guest stars	Brian Parker and Frank W. Smith	Len Collin, Steve Hawes and Scott Cherry	10 August 2001
58	"Britanniamania"	Karl Howman guest stars	Brian Parker and Frank W. Smith	Len Collin, Steve Hawes and Scott Cherry	14 August 2001
59	"Britanniamania"	Karl Howman guest stars	Brian Parker and Frank W. Smith	Len Collin, Steve Hawes and Scott Cherry	17 August 2001
Part One – Going Underground: Chandler is approached by Chief Inspector Morys from the Football Intelligence Unit when an undercover officer is stabbed on Sun Hill's patch after a game. Chandler and Morys start a joint operation to infiltrate the gang responsible, Britannia, spearheaded by former police officer Julian Napper. Webb is sent undercover as builder Mickey Malone, with Riley and Quinnan his undercover partners and McAllister posing as his girlfriend. Webb gets gang member Gary Hughes on side, and he travels with him up north to meet Napper. Part Two – To Us and Ours: Webb closes on infiltrating the gang, despite the suspicions of some of its members. Suspicions are fueled when McAllister, posing as his girlfriend, turns up to a gang meeting overdressed and wearing Givenchy perfume. Napper smells a rat and follows McAllister as she desperately tries to find a hospital to keep her cover intact. Napper catches up with her and accuses her of being an undercover reporter. With her cover blown, McAllister returns to Sun Hill. Chandler blasts her for her stupidity, and forces her to take notes as they hear Webb taking a severe beating from Napper's thugs. Part Three – Kick Off: The England game is on, and the Britannia gang are set for a battle with the "Dogs of Hell", an opposing European gang of hooligans. Webb is assigned to find the location of the pre-match meeting, while Riley and Quinnan go undercover at the match itself. To Riley's horror, Quinnan is arrested when he accuses a photographer of inciting violence. Webb, meanwhile, is on his own after a mix-up about the meeting location, and ends up in the thick of a pitched battle between the gangs. When the nearest riot unit available are deployed from Sun Hill, Webb's cover is blown when he is recognised by some of his fellow officers. Part Four – Stand By Me: A series of dawn raids capture most of the Britannia gang, but Julian Napper and Gary Hughes are still at large. With Napper on the loose, Chandler and Meadows insist Webb go into hiding, but he refuses to be intimidated, even when Lennox's wife's car goes up in flames outside Webb's flat. Webb finds Gary Hughes and tries to persuade him into exposing Napper's location. Chandler and Morys begin to suspect that Webb is informing Napper of their movements, but when the FIU's DS John Curtis concocts a story about Hughes escaping custody, they discover he is Napper's brother-in-law and the informant. Webb then races to Napper's hideout to try to save Hughes.
60	"Beech on the Run"	90-minute special, guest appearances of Don Beech and Claire Stanton; John Noble and Jason Clarke guest star	Ian White	Steve Griffiths	19 August 2001
Claire Stanton, now a DI, heads to Australia to extradite former colleague Don Beech for the murder of their colleague, and Stanton's former fiancé, DS John Boulton. The Sydney police tell Stanton that Beech has linked up with Vietnamese criminal Frankie Nguyen, with the pair going from partners in crime to romantic partners in the nine months since Beech landed in Sydney. The local force suspect that Beech has flown under the radar thanks to recently suspended local officer Bill Mayle, who puts Beech in touch with a local drugs kingpin. Beech's greed sees him raid Triad leader Joey Tranh, who then holds Nguyen's pregnant sister hostage to get Beech's location. Stanton attempts to derail a drugs raid on Beech so he can be arrested for Boulton's murder instead. As Stanton and her police contact find Beech's hideout, Tranh shows up to murder Beech, but when shots ring out it's Tranh who is found dead. As Beech attacks Stanton's contact, she goes after her nemesis to ensure he doesn't evade capture again.
61	"Beech is Back"	Guest appearances of Don Beech and Claire Stanton	Derek Lister and Justin Hardy	Tony McHale	21 August 2001
62	"Beech is Back"	Guest appearances of Don Beech and Claire Stanton	Derek Lister and Justin Hardy	Tony McHale	24 August 2001
63	"Beech is Back"	Guest appearances of Don Beech and Claire Stanton	Derek Lister and Justin Hardy	Tony McHale	28 August 2001
64	"Beech is Back"	Guest appearances of Don Beech and Claire Stanton	Derek Lister and Justin Hardy	Tony McHale	31 August 2001
65	"Beech is Back"	Guest appearances of Don Beech and Claire Stanton	Derek Lister and Justin Hardy	Tony McHale	4 September 2001
66	"Beech is Back"	Guest appearances of Don Beech and Claire Stanton	Derek Lister and Justin Hardy	Tony McHale	7 September 2001
Part One: After faking his death in Australia, Beech returns to London and pulls off a £6.5 million pound safety deposit box robbery, using a car bomb as a distraction. Stanton, now with a security firm, is assigned the task of retrieving documents stolen in the heist for a particularly rich client. While Beech's old friend Tommy cashes up his haul, Beech's firm are becoming increasingly frustrated at not receiving their cut of the cash. While Stanton continues to engineer the safe return of the documents, and organises a drop off, she spots none other than Frankie Nguyen getting into the back of a cab. As Tommy refuses to deal with Frankie, she lashes out, leading to disastrous consequences. Part Two: Beech informs Tommy's daughter Stella that her father was murdered, and promises to find his killer. Meanwhile, Frankie panics about being seen by Stanton, who is hot on her tail. Stanton is pulled in for questioning over her contact with Greneski, and plants the theory that Beech is still alive and is responsible for the robbery. Frankie starts to become more and more agitated at the fact that Beech wants to stick around in London, and Beech gets the shock of his life when Stanton turns up at Tommy's shop. Stanton gets a shock of her own when an anonymous tip leads her to find Beech at a local graveyard, but Beech is determined not to let Stanton get the better of him once again. Part Three: Beech takes Stanton hostage in his car, but on the way to a secret location, is pulled over by two uniform PCs for his erratic driving. Posing as "Matthew Boyden" from Sun Hill, Beech once again makes good his escape and takes Stanton to an underground bunker where Frankie urges him to kill her. When he refuses, Frankie decides she'll have to do it herself, or risk being taken in and imprisoned. Beech disapproves of Frankie's methods when she uses forms of torture to gather information from Stanton. Frankie realises that Beech may no longer be on her side, so she goes over the side and offers to help Stanton in any way she can. Part Four: Beech's trust in Frankie begins to slip, and as he sends her out on a number of errands, he keeps an increasingly twitchy Stanton under lock-and-key. However, Stanton manages to make radio contact with an outsider and he alerts DS Peters and DCI Belmarsh from the Robbery Squad, who begin a search for the underground bunker where she is being held. In an effort to escape, Stanton breaks the lock and shatters any chances of Beech letting her go. As the team locate Stanton's hiding place, they are forced to use cutting equipment to get through the steel door into the bunker. However, Beech hatches a plan that puts everyone in the vicinity at risk, including himself. Part Five: Beech manages to get himself back to London after the explosion at his bunker, but suspects that Frankie has double-crossed him, so he finds a new ally in the form of Rachel, Tommy's granddaughter. As Rachel holds Beech up in an apartment supposedly owned by her married lover, Stanton recovers in hospital. When Beech discovers that Frankie is trying to broker the deal without him, he goes in search of his former partner, only to be cornered by Giorgio, who turns up at the handover and demands his share of the money. As the tensions rise, bullets fly, leaving several members of the gang dead. Part Six: Following his murder of Giorgio and the shooting of Frankie, a devastated and wounded Beech leaves the bodies behind and flees with the takings from the robbery. Beech escapes once more, unaware that a fully recovered Stanton is hot on his tail. Stanton trails Rachel and discovers that she is sleeping with Mal Lockye, a bent police officer whose deposit box was raided by Beech during the robbery, and Rachel has been setting up Beech in order to get Lockye's money back. As a wounded Beech makes good his escape, his plan falls to pieces when he realises that not only has Rachel lured him to a false getaway, but that she was the one who set Stanton onto him in the graveyard. Stanton takes control and Beech begs her to kill him to get justice for John, but she has a different idea of what justice is.
67	"Trust, Part II"	Jonathan Coy and Richard Mylan guest star	Mike Adams and Michael Morris	Stephen Plaice and Marcus Brent	14 September 2001
68	"Trust, Part II"	Jonathan Coy and Richard Mylan guest star	Mike Adams and Michael Morris	Stephen Plaice and Marcus Brent	18 September 2001
69	"Trust, Part II"	Jonathan Coy and Richard Mylan guest star	Mike Adams and Michael Morris	Stephen Plaice and Marcus Brent	21 September 2001
Part One – On a Clear Day: Rickman's loyalties are divided when she's faced with the return of her ex-lover, Leroy Jones. Harker tries to warn her that Leroy is still up to no good, and soon discovers that Leroy is under surveillance by National Crime Squad. Meanwhile, Cullen is trying to prove his worth to the NCS, and uses the news of Leroy's return to try to get his feet under the table. When Leroy is implicated in an investigation regarding an undercover police officer, Rickman wonders if she has given too much information away, and finds herself testing her own loyalties. As Klein and the rest of the relief celebrate his birthday, Leroy asks a stunned Rickman to leave Sun Hill and move to South Africa with him. Part Two – Come Live With Me: As Harker becomes involved in the NCS investigation, he warns Rickman about Leroy's suspected connection with heroin smuggling and a triple-homicide, but she doesn't believe him until she confronts Leroy. With the help of Nina, a woman he met in the hotel lobby, Harker keeps tabs on Leroy's movements until the NCS and CID make their move and raid a nightclub owned by one of Leroy's associates, Jan Resenbrink. A search of the furniture by Customs reveals no drugs as suspected, so Leroy is released. As he angrily heads off to the airport, leaving behind a distraught Rickman, his fingerprints are found on a gun used to murder an undercover NCS officer, DS Hanbury. Part Three – In Another Life: Harker tells Cullen that he knows Leroy didn't kill DS Hanbury, but CID use the charge as leverage to convince Leroy to help them catch Resenbrink. Rickman attends a possibly racially motivated attack on Didi Marr, the boy who was found with heroin on the Bronte Estate. His attacker is Nicky Gable, and the racial element of the case becomes unlikely when it is revealed that Gable is in mourning for his mixed-race brother. Harker arranges with Leroy to escape, and offers to clear him of the murder charge on the condition that he ends his relationship with Rickman. With Leroy's help, Cullen and Pennington arrest Resenbrink, but when he is freed on bail, events take a disastrous turn. Part One was set to air on 11 September 2001; however, it was delayed for three days by the ITV1's news coverage of the September 11 attacks. EPG listings still stated this was to be transmitted on its scheduled day
70	"Crush"	Victoria Shalet guest stars	Herbert Wise	Phil Ford	25 September 2001
Taviner and Hollis attend when a gang of masked girls armed with baseball bats raid gifts at a wedding. The gang's violence intensifies and the bride's sister, Debbie Pike, is found badly beaten after an altercation with a mother and her baby on the high street. Chandler sends Spears to visit the local schools, ostensibly to encourage students to join the Met's Volunteer Cadet Corps, but secretly to obtain information on the gang and its members. As rumours about her and Chandler fly around the station, Spears pushes an eager schoolboy informant too far.
71	"Liquid City"	Hilda Braid guest stars	Herbert Wise	Phillip Gladwin	28 September 2001
Chandler is fuming when he attends a Met gala on a boat and witnesses Taviner and Hollis bungle a burglary in a riverside house, so he assigns Spears to work on Sun Hill's burglary statistics, and she finds a link between a number of break-ins. Chandler is then furious when Cullen hires a criminal profiler, Roy Stenning, but his information gets CID close to a likely suspect. It comes too late when the intruder strikes again, this time setting a house alight, killing two children. Meanwhile, Taviner bails Hollis out when he finds the address of a potential love interest on the PNC and gets caught by Chandler, but Taviner is then issued a stark warning by Chandler, who is under pressure himself when CID begin to suspect him of having an affair with Spears.
72	"Debt of Love"	Jaime Murray, Nick Brimble, Arthur White, Archie Panjabi and Pamela Cundell guest star	Penelope Shales and Michael Owen Morris	Julie White and Hugh Ellis	2 October 2001
73	"Debt of Love"	Jaime Murray, Nick Brimble, Arthur White, Archie Panjabi and Pamela Cundell guest star	Penelope Shales and Michael Owen Morris	Julie White and Hugh Ellis	5 October 2001
74	"Debt of Love"	Jaime Murray, Nick Brimble, Arthur White, Archie Panjabi and Pamela Cundell guest star	Penelope Shales and Michael Owen Morris	Julie White and Hugh Ellis	9 October 2001
Part One – A Pound of Flesh: The relief find themselves short-staffed with Boyden and Hagen having taken leave. Singh investigates several assault cases, which he believes are down to a moneylender getting heavy handed when calling in a debt. Ackland sees the mother of one of the victims talking to Amy, Boyden's daughter, and it turns out she is also in debt to the loan shark. When Amy is arrested for petty theft, Ackland convinces Boyden to talk to her, and when Amy is assaulted by the loan shark's thugs, Boyden resolves to pay off her debt himself. When he turns up with the money, he is recognised by one of the men as a police officer, blows a CID raid on the office and leaves Amy in grave danger. Part Two – Home Run: Boyden goes all out to protect his daughter Amy after the arson attack on her flat. Hagen is sceptical of Amy's true motives, and her suspicions are confirmed when she finds her going through her bag. Meanwhile, Singh pressures one of his informants, Shanaz, into setting up a drug deal with the Mullens. However, unbeknown to him, the operation has already been rumbled and his informant is about to become the victim of a savage beating. While out on patrol, Hagen and Carver catch sight of Amy and decide to follow her. They witness a drug deal taking place involving Amy, Ashley Mullen and an unknown courier from the estate. Having no choice but to report it, Amy is arrested. Part Three – Debt of Love: Ackland visits Boyden at home to discuss Amy's disappearance, and offers to help with his granddaughter, Sophie. Later, Hagen arrives, but their encounter is frosty, as Boyden still hasn't forgiven her for shopping Amy. With no formal police co-operation, Boyden sets out to find his daughter himself. Police informant Tyne tells Singh that Amy is a drugs courier for Ashley Mullen. Despite Amy's involvement, Cullen agrees to a covert operation at the next drop. Meanwhile, Boyden manages to trace Amy, who claims to be in great danger, and begs him to look after Sophie until she has sorted things out. As Boyden lets her go, Hagen rings to alert him about CID's plans.
75	"Blood and Money"	Robert Blythe, Andrew McCulloch and Desmond McNamara guest star	JJ Keith	Chris Ould	12 October 2001
Boyden meets an old acquaintance, ex-fighter Billy Briggs, who tells him about an illegal fight being organised by Kieron O'Shea, and offers his services as an informant. Boyden visits a gym, where Briggs' story is confirmed, but he also learns that Briggs is also taking part in the fight. Boyden transfers the case to CID, who show an interest and request further information. Briggs admits to Boyden that, despite medical advice, he is taking part in the fight, as he owes O'Shea money. Boyden goes undercover in attempt to catch O'Shea, but his cover is quickly blown and O'Shea is arrested. Briggs, however, is frightened into withdrawing his allegation, and the case looks on the verge of collapse.
76	"Hidden Agendas"	Gerard Murphy and Gordon Warnecke guest star	JJ Keith	Julian Spilsbury	16 October 2001
Hagen and Boyden are once again paired together during an obbo on the Padfield brothers, who are suspected of several attacks on transvestites. However, during the arrest, Boyden has trouble with one of the suspects and is unable to fully caution him. When a witness to one of the assaults comes forward and identifies the Padfields, CID are confident of getting a result. However, Padfield complains that he wasn't fully cautioned. Despite Boyden's insistence, Meadows demands confirmation, and Boyden realises his only hope lies with Hagen. Despite the urgings of Meadows, Hagen refuses to vouch for him. Hagen makes a last-ditch effort to save their relationship, but Boyden throws her out.
77	"Lifelines"	Final appearances of PC Vicky Hagen and Ch Supt Guy Mannion; Leonard Fenton, Clare Clifford, Rocky Marshall and Margot Leicester guest star	Roberto Bangura	Stephen Plaice and Neil Clarke	19 October 2001
78	"Lifelines"	Final appearances of PC Vicky Hagen and Ch Supt Guy Mannion; Leonard Fenton, Clare Clifford, Rocky Marshall and Margot Leicester guest star	Roberto Bangura	Stephen Plaice and Neil Clarke	26 October 2001
Part One – Lifelines: Hagen, still hurting over her breakup with Boyden, is paired with Stamp to investigate the mugging of pensioner Archie Dodds, who has had his wallet taken by a youth. When the mugger is spotted assaulting another pensioner, the pair set off in pursuit; however, when Stamp stops to help the victim, the suspect manages to escape, and Hagen's impatience gets the better of her, resulting in the pair having an ugly argument. Elsewhere, Taviner is fed up of Carver's "community policing", so Monroe swaps with him with Hagen. She and Taviner find they have a lot in common, but it soon becomes clear he is only being friendly to get her into bed, and she delivers a swift knee into the groin when he makes a cruel comment about her dating history. To get her mind off it, Hagen reluctantly joins Page, Clarke, Rickman and Worrell on a girls' night out, and quickly picks up a date in the club; as she takes him home to Page's flat, disaster strikes. Part Two – Sacrifice: As the dead body of her one-night stand, Rob Tucker, is carried out of Page's flat, Hagen is taken into Sun Hill by CID for a taped interview. She is soon cleared of any involvement, as Rob's death was clearly a suicide, but is determined to find out what drove Rob to kill himself. Off-duty, Hagen discovers that his real name was Rob Seaton, and that he had recently served a prison term for rape. When Carver arrests a violent husband, Paul Worth, Hagen discovers his wife Yvonne was the woman who accused Seaton of rape. When Taviner gets hold of the tape of Hagen's interview, he plays a cruel prank as revenge for her rejecting him the day before, playing the tape over the PA system. While Chandler and Mannion are furious, Hagen gets her own back by stealing the Area Car from Taviner when he fails to attend a domestic at the Worth household, where events have taken a sinister turn. After the case concludes, Hagen makes a huge decision about her future.
79	"White Cliffs of Dover"	—	John Bruce	Steve Handley	2 November 2001
Meadows is approached by a German lawyer, Eva Melchor, who has an interesting proposal from her client, a notorious armed robber named Paul Kerrigan. Kerrigan's sister Rene is dying, and provided he is allowed to see her one last time, he will not only turn himself in to Meadows, he will also identify members of the M25 gang, a vicious gang of armed robbers who have been terrorising London. True to his word, Kerrigan shops Kevin Lee, the gang's armourer, and a search reveals a cache of weapons in Lee's pet shop. With MIT and OCG eagerly awaiting Kerrigan's information, Meadows places Kerrigan in a safe house. When a series of car bombs outside the safehouse distract Carver and Worrell, Kerrigan escapes. Thinking Kerrigan has fled, Meadows is stunned when his nemesis turns up dead. Attention turns to Melchor, the only other person besides the police who knew where he was being held, but is she a suspect or the next victim?
80	"The Value of Nothing"	Rebecca Saire, Jonathan Aris, Fiona Dolman and Rupert Frazer guest star	Albert Barber	Ed Jones	9 November 2001
While on a week's secondment to Scotland Yard's Art and Antiques Squad, Lennox is tasked with investigating a young woman, Tessa Gannon, who tried to sell a forged painting to a gallery. Lennox soon finds a receipt from a gallery owned by an art dealer named Ivor Gregory, who has form for deception. Lennox befriends an artist named Richard Townes, who charges into Gregory's gallery as Lennox peruses the paintings. In the hope of getting a closer look at one of the paintings, Lennox arranges for his wife Shona to buy one of them. He gets it verified, and is disappointed when it is an original. When the painting is returned for re-framing, Lennox realises Gregory has swapped it for a fake.
81	"Money Man"	90-minute special; Michael J. Jackson and David Schofield guest star	Graham Moore	Steve Handley	16 November 2001
Meadows is determined to bring one of his nemeses, Andy Burton, to justice for a safety deposit box robbery he committed in the 80's, for which there was little evidence to prove his involvement. In order to gather evidence on Burton, who is serving twenty years in Shadwell for armed robbery, he sends Glaze undercover into the prison. Glaze soon befriends a convicted paedophile, Ricky Sefton, who provides him with information on Burton's dealings, and when the pair become acquainted, Glaze finds himself in the middle of a delicate situation – breaking out of prison while holding a guard at gunpoint. However, unbeknown to him, Burton has already discovered he's a cop, and has already plotted his downfall.
82	"Beyond the Call"	Stuart Laing guest stars	Albert Barber	J.C. Wilsher	20 November 2001
When Stamp and Rickman arrest a young man, Dougie Morgan, for possession of crack, Morgan offers to help them catch David Swain, the prime suspect for the murder of McAllister's ex-lover and informant Jamie Ross. McAllister convinces Cullen to place Spears undercover as a temporary receptionist at the office of Swain's lawyer. Swain takes quite a liking to Spears and asks her out on a date. McAllister, desperate for a result, pushes Spears to do "whatever it takes" to find out more. Spears comes up with the information that Swain is planning a raid on a rival crack factory, and a TSG/SO19 swoop arrests both parties. Cullen is furious when the case is dropped, due to accusations of Spears's "improper" relationship with the suspect.
83	"Night Games"	Final appearances of PC Roz Clarke and Sgt Stuart Lamont; guest appearance of Liz Rawton; Tristan Gemmill, Tony Blackburn, Ralf Little, Bruno Tonioli, Brian Croucher, Michael McKell and Eric Mason guest star	Laurence Moody, Declan O'Dwyer and John Davies	Elizabeth Anne-Wheal, Gregory Evans, Richard Stoneman and Henrietta Hardy	23 November 2001
84	"Night Games"	Final appearances of PC Roz Clarke and Sgt Stuart Lamont; guest appearance of Liz Rawton; Tristan Gemmill, Tony Blackburn, Ralf Little, Bruno Tonioli, Brian Croucher, Michael McKell and Eric Mason guest star	Laurence Moody, Declan O'Dwyer and John Davies	Elizabeth Anne-Wheal, Gregory Evans, Richard Stoneman and Henrietta Hardy	27 November 2001
85	"Night Games"	Final appearances of PC Roz Clarke and Sgt Stuart Lamont; guest appearance of Liz Rawton; Tristan Gemmill, Tony Blackburn, Ralf Little, Bruno Tonioli, Brian Croucher, Michael McKell and Eric Mason guest star	Laurence Moody, Declan O'Dwyer and John Davies	Elizabeth Anne-Wheal, Gregory Evans, Richard Stoneman and Henrietta Hardy	30 November 2001
86	"Night Games"	Final appearances of PC Roz Clarke and Sgt Stuart Lamont; guest appearance of Liz Rawton; Tristan Gemmill, Tony Blackburn, Ralf Little, Bruno Tonioli, Brian Croucher, Michael McKell and Eric Mason guest star	Laurence Moody, Declan O'Dwyer and John Davies	Elizabeth Anne-Wheal, Gregory Evans, Richard Stoneman and Henrietta Hardy	4 December 2001
87	"Night Games"	Final appearances of PC Roz Clarke and Sgt Stuart Lamont; guest appearance of Liz Rawton; Tristan Gemmill, Tony Blackburn, Ralf Little, Bruno Tonioli, Brian Croucher, Michael McKell and Eric Mason guest star	Laurence Moody, Declan O'Dwyer and John Davies	Elizabeth Anne-Wheal, Gregory Evans, Richard Stoneman and Henrietta Hardy	7 December 2001
88	"Night Games"	Final appearances of PC Roz Clarke and Sgt Stuart Lamont; guest appearance of Liz Rawton; Tristan Gemmill, Tony Blackburn, Ralf Little, Bruno Tonioli, Brian Croucher, Michael McKell and Eric Mason guest star	Laurence Moody, Declan O'Dwyer and John Davies	Elizabeth Anne-Wheal, Gregory Evans, Richard Stoneman and Henrietta Hardy	11 December 2001
Part One – Night Games: Liz Rawton returns to her old stomping ground Sun Hill to head up an operation into catching a dangerous rapist who has committed over 20 attacks. Meanwhile, Ackland is unable to attend the final of the "Ask a Policeman" quiz hosted by Tony Blackburn, forcing Monroe to replace her with Spears. Spears saves the day and wins the relief a weekend away at a grand hotel. However, unwilling to go, she asks to be seconded to Rawton's investigation, but her request is denied by Cullen and she is forced to go "team building" at the hotel. Rickman and Clarke take a shine to Thames Valley DS Pete Cork, but he only has eyes for a certain DC. By bribing a hotel rep, Cork ensures that his blind date for the salsa evening is Spears. Part Two – Aftershock: A traumatized Spears attempts to escape from her attempted rape by DS Cork. He eventually leaves and chats up Rickman, allowing a reeling Spears to recover. Her hopes of forgetting the events of the night before are extinguished when Cork re-appears, and things take a shocking turn when one of the event coordinators turns up dead. Meanwhile, Rawton is devastated when her main informant and one of the early rape victims, Terri Gibbings, goes missing. As she liaises with none other than DS Cork, she brings him on board as a profiler. Spears decides after her ordeal that she no longer wants to be on the rape case, but when Rawton's DS Pauline Wherry is caught being heavy handed with a victim, Rawton boots her off the team and Cullen volunteers Spears to replace her. To make things worse for Spears, she discovers Cork is the new profiler. Part Three – Compulsion: Rawton addresses the team, and puts forward the theory that rape victim and informant Terri's death was not suicide, but murder. While Cork and Singh voice doubts, Spears supports Rawton's theory. Spears returns to the riverside where Terri's body was found, and makes a major break-through when a passer-by reveals that his wife saw Terri's body being dumped. Later, Spears decides to keep an eye on Cork, and follows him to a pub where he meets an old mate, DI Freddie Collins. On her return, Spears spots a man lurking outside her flat, but he turns out to be her old friend Eddie, who works for the Thames Valley police. After trying to dig up information on Cork, Eddie disappears without trace. Part Four – Shout: While Rawton and Cork are visiting the scene of the latest attack, Cork is doubtful that the perpetrator is the same man that they are looking for, as there is no bag over the victim's head, and her hands haven't been tied. Following a lead from Cork about a rapist he pursued years earlier, Rawton consults an ignorant DI Collins, but Cork demands he "play nice". Meanwhile, Spears is fruitlessly searching for her missing friend Eddie. She fears for his safety when Cork hands in his phone, claiming to have found it. As Singh propounds to Cork and Rawton that their prey might be getting bolder, Rawton gets a blast from the past that leaves her mortified. Part Five – Judas Kiss: Spears is horrified when she is confronted by Cork in her own flat, and when Webb comes to her rescue, he gets the wrong end of the stick and thinks she is now dating Cork. The following day, while searching suspect Bennett's home, Spears is suspicious when Rawton finds evidence on a shelf Cork claimed not to check. Clarke feels disillusioned as she faces a CIB grilling for her savage attack on Bennett during the undercover op, but she gets a further shock when an emotional Spears admits what Cork did to her. As both Cork and Spears go missing, Rawton is disappointed she didn't work out what Spears was going through, but the night is only going to get worse as Cork comes face to face with rapist Ferdinand. Meanwhile, Klein is blackmailed by hotel worker Tommy as he wrongly awaits trial for the crush Fay, the woman killed at the hotel. Part Six – Slash and Burn: Spears looks on as an injured Cork is left to die by Ferdinand, but her fear turns to joy when Taviner and Rickman arrive to arrest Ferdinand. Unfortunately, Ferdinand escapes without capture. Meanwhile, Rawton invites a traumatised Spears to stay at her place. That night, she is awoken by a sound, and goes to find Rawton being brutally attacked by DI Collins. Overpowered, he is brought in for questioning, but refuses to talk. Ferdinand proves evasive, despite evidence that he has been in Spears's flat the night before. A search of his house uncovers a large amount of money and a passport, but Rawton realises it is a decoy, and Spears goes in search of the real running-away kit.
89	"For Better, For Worse"	Denise Black guest stars	Michael Owen Morris	Steve Hawes	14 December 2001
Page and Rickman investigate when a woman is reported missing by her neighbours. She was last heard arguing with her violent ex-con husband, but as they check out his home address, they fail to find anything relating to her disappearance. Her husband then comes to the station to report his ex-wife missing, and a search is conducted of his house. Her ex-husband is convinced she has scarpered to Spain, but Stamp uncovers a box in the garden containing a gun and an empty jeweller's bag. Butterworth is taken in for questioning but, with no real evidence, he is released. Meadows then discovers that Rosie may well have run off with the proceeds of a robbery that Butterworth went down for.
90	"Special Constable Part 1"	First appearance of SC Terry Knowles; Robin Lermitte and Christopher Adamson guest star	Ken Hannam and John Bruce	Stuart Blackburn and Len Collin	18 December 2001
91	"Special Constable Part 1"	First appearance of SC Terry Knowles; Robin Lermitte and Christopher Adamson guest star	Ken Hannam and John Bruce	Stuart Blackburn and Len Collin	20 December 2001
92	"Special Constable Part 1"	First appearance of SC Terry Knowles; Robin Lermitte and Christopher Adamson guest star	Ken Hannam and John Bruce	Stuart Blackburn and Len Collin	21 December 2001
Special Attention: Taviner and Hollis are "volunteered" to look after new recruit, Special Constable Terry Knowles. Meanwhile, Singh and Riley visit the Mahmoods, whose house has been vandalised. They claim that their neighbours, the Halston family, are racists, and imply they caused the damage after Janice Halston was sacked from launderette for stealing. Out on the beat, Knowles is desperate to prove himself, and wants to attend the call when he hears that the Mahmoods' launderette has been smashed up, but Taviner tells him to wait. Later, Taviner insists they ignore a call, requesting further help for the Mahmoods. Back at the station, Gilmore cautions Taviner to refrain from corrupting Knowles. Lure of the Sirens: An angry Taviner is allocated to CAD duty by Gilmore, who is determined to rein in the maverick copper. Taviner responds by going home sick. Stamp is amused by Taviner's predicament, but Knowles is sympathetic. Meanwhile, the relief are called to a domestic disturbance, where a man trying to get into his estranged wife's house. He wants to take his sons to a football match, but his wife won't allow it. Knowles makes his feelings clear about absent fathers, but Hollis reprimands him. As they attend a call regarding youths damaging cars, they recognise Josh, a young lad who is infatuated with Taviner. He denies doing the damage, but gives a description of those responsible. When Taviner returns to work under orders from Monroe, Josh takes drastic action to get Taviner's attention. The Risk Factor: Carver and Taviner follow Page and Knowles into a flat, where they find terrified tenant Billy Martin. Outside, they chase two masked men but lose them. Later, Taviner is water-bombed by kids, much to his colleagues' amusement. Later, Page and Knowles spot a man hanging around a local school, and Knowles gives chase, but loses him. Page later identifies him as Dave Scoby, a registered sex offender. Knowles notices his address, and is concerned as he lives nearby to his sister and her daughters. Page makes it clear that no matter what his concerns are, he is not allowed to tell them. Knowles struggles to keep the information to himself, but unwisely confides in Taviner. These episodes are the first three of a 6-part storyline that continues at the beginning of Series 18
