= The Bill series 16 =

The Bill
- Series 16
- No. of episodes: 86

Release
- Original network: ITV
- Original release: 4 January – 29 December 2000

Series chronology
- ← Previous; Series 15 Next → Series 17

Series 16 of British television drama The Bill consists of 86 episodes, broadcast between 4 January and 26 December 2000.

As well as 83 regular episodes, the series also included a two-part recap special, '"Kiss Off'", featuring a condensed broadcast of the Series 15 episodes "Lone Ranger", "Old Flame", "Push It" and "Kiss Off", prior to a special episode, "The Trial of Eddie Santini'", which provides closure to the Santini storyline from 1999.

On 5 June 2013, The Bill Series 16 Part 1 and 2 and The Bill Series 16 Part 3 and 4 DVD sets were released in Australia.

== Storylines ==
On screen, it was revealed in the spring that DS Claire Stanton, introduced in the previous season, was working as a mole in CID for the Complaints Investigation Bureau to bring down DS Don Beech. The storyline stretched five months and reached a denouement when DS John Boulton was killed by Beech. The climax, however, would not happen until the following series when Beech surfaced in Australia. The storyline saw CID obliterated, with DCI Jack Meadows and DCs Duncan Lennox, Danny Glaze and Mickey Webb the only characters left in CID. Chief Superintendent Charles Brownlow also exited during the Beech saga, ending a 16-year stint on the show for actor Peter Ellis; however, he would go on to make a guest appearance in 2002. Ellis's final episode, "All Fall Down: Part 1", was written by his son Hugh. As a result of the CID exodus, five new officers were introduced to the department, as well as a new station commander, Tom Chandler. By the series finale, Brownlow was the only Chief Superintendent to have run Sun Hill. Each station commander that succeeded Brownlow held the rank of Superintendent, with Chief Superintendent reserved for the Borough Commanders. In addition to the death of Boulton, the murder of DS Rosie Fox saw the first death of a main character in the series since PC Cathy Marshall in 1996.

DCI Frank Burnside made his final appearance in the series proper in January after getting an ill-fated spinoff that would end up lasting for only one series; Burnside aired in the spring of 2000.

== Cast changes ==
=== Arrivals ===
- DC Mickey Webb (Episode 25–)
- PC Roz Clarke (Episode 60–)
- PC Ben Hayward (Episode 60–)
- DI Alex Cullen (Episode 73–)
- DC Kate Spears (Episode 73–)
- DS Debbie McAllister (Episode 73–)
- DS Vik Singh (Episode 73–)
- DC Paul Riley (Episode 73–)
- Supt Tom Chandler (Episode 73–)

=== Departures ===
- DC Rod Skase – Resigns before dismissal for negligence
- DC Tom Proctor – Transfers to Isleworth CSU
- DS John Boulton – Killed by DS Beech
- Ch Supt Charles Brownlow – Resigns and retires in wake of the Beech scandal
- DC Kerry Holmes – Voluntarily transfers after Beech scandal
- DI Chris Deakin – Forced to transfer after Beech scandal
- DS Geoff Daly – Forced to transfer after Beech scandal
- DS Don Beech – Goes on the run after killing DS Boulton
- DS Claire Stanton – Transfers back to CIB after Beech scandal
- PC Gary McCann – Transfers to another station after receiving promotion to sergeant

== Episodes ==
No.	Title	Episode notes	Directed by	Written by	Original air date
1	"Angel"	Gerard Murphy guest stars	Michael Ferguson	Steve Griffiths	4 January 2000
Burnside is drafted in after a murder appears to be linked to a series of male rapes being investigated by Stanton. Andy Wilson, one of the previous victims remembers something about an angel when he was attacked. Following a statement from taxi driver Steve Sanderson, Kerry finds a man matching the description given by Sanderson's on CCTV tapes: his name is Mark Angelis and he works for a courier service with an angel logo. Although John arrests Angelis in possession of a knife, he insists it is for self defence against the rapist. Stanton visits a profiler at Scotland Yard, and later discovers that taxi driver Sanderson has made a similar statement to Stafford Row station. As Stanton and Proctor visit Sanderson's wife, and discover evidence that he is the culprit, Burnside is left in danger after unknowingly getting in the back of Sanderson's cab.
2	"In the Firing Line"	Matthew Marsh and Michael Redfern guest star	Bob Blagden	Clive Dawson	6 January 2000
Smith gets a big undercover role as a bodyguard for South African drug importer Tony Rourke. Rourke offers him a contract to kidnap and torture a senior police officer to find the location of a police informant they need kept quiet. Ordered by SO10's DCI Tasker to remain in place and find out more, Smithy comes up with a plan to abduct the officer, but he is stunned when it turns out to be Meadows. Rourke and his right-hand man Jake begin to doubt Smithy's integrity, and end up executing his plan themselves. With Meadows missing, a massive search is underway, until Smithy convinces Ken Stockley, the informant Rourke and his financier are after, he will use him as an exchange to get Meadows safely returned. After revealing a possible location for Meadows, Stockley stuns Daly and Smith when he tells them who the mysterious money man is.
3	"Thug on the Tyne"	Final appearance of DCI Frank Burnside; guest appearance of Liz Rawton	Ken Hannam	Steve Griffiths	11 January 2000
4	"Thug on the Tyne"	Final appearance of DCI Frank Burnside; guest appearance of Liz Rawton	Ken Hannam	Steve Griffiths	13 January 2000
Part One: Burnside goes undercover for Northumbria Police to investigate corruption inside the department, setting them up by putting four packages of cocaine and a handgun in his boot before taking them on a high-speed car chase through Newcastle. Rawton poses as his solicitor, and when one of their main targets, DI Walker, mentions there were only two bags of cocaine seized, they tell him to call in DCI Bonnet, their primary target. Offering him a bribe, Burnside is bailed and meets his UC. As they settle into the car dealership they are running undercover, Burnside and Rawton are taken to an off the record interview with Bonnet and Walker. Bonnet introduces Burnside to local drugs kingpin Saul Anderson, but is subject to a beating and a death threat, until he talks himself out of trouble. When Bonnet and Burnside visit a private club, they are left panicking as a police raid occurs inside the club. Part Two: Despite being undercover, Burnside agrees to let Rawton visit her mother after bumping into her cousin Cheryl the night before. The pair attend a family gathering where she is stunned to discover Cheryl's boyfriend is an associate of Saul Anderson; they survive with their covers intactthough, Burnside even taking part in a little karaoke! He is not pleased, however, when Customs seize a crateful of guns meant for Anderson that he was supposed to see through. Anderson is similarly unimpressed, but when Rawton discovers Cheryl could be responsible for a leak to Customs, Burnside tells the gang he thinks her boyfriend is responsible. As Bonnet's own role in betraying Anderson becomes apparent, a shootout leads to bodies dropping and Burnside fighting for his life.
5	"Riot City"	P. H. Moriarty guest stars	Ian White	J. C. Wilsher	18 January 2000
Conway and a team of Sun Hill officers undergo riot simulation training at the Met's training depot in Hounslow. However, Conway's tactics are called into question and the team's first mock operation goes horribly wrong. Meanwhile, Glaze goes undercover on the Cockroft Estate to gather evidence of residents dealing in stolen goods, but discovers more than he bargains for when he discovers two rival families, the Barnes and the Cutlers, battling for control of the estate. With the Cutlers stockpiling petrol bombs and the Barnes holding live weapons ready for a showdown, Glaze goes all out to track down the location of the weapons so a raid can be conducted before things can go awry. However, tension is rife on the estate after Page accidentally hospitalises a mentally challenged black youth, hitting him in the head as he tried to attack Smith, leaving Brownlow struggling to deal with a protest outside Sun Hill.
6	"Crime and Punishment"	Shirley Anne Field and Dorian Lough guest star	Baz Taylor	Arthur Ellis	25 January 2000
Brownlow attends the funeral service of an old colleague that he used to serve with when he was in 182 squad, but soon finds that old wounds are beginning to reopen themselves as old grudges come to light. When Brownlow's archenemy becomes drunk and assaults two men at the wake, he uses the opportunity to bring his enemy down once and for all. Little does he know that the entire ex-182 squad is being investigated for insurance fraud by an undercover officer from the Fraud Squad – so Brownlow sets out to find out who framed him and why. Meanwhile, Hollis investigates suspicious events at a crematorium after a number of cars are broken into at the funeral service, suspecting that an insider is tipping off a local robber as to the value of the cars at the service.
7	"Zero Tolerance"	Ann Mitchell, Martha Cope, David Robb and David Daker guest star	John Davies	Ron Rose	27 January 2000
Monroe has trouble dealing with a gang of boy-racers who are harassing and intimidating an elderly couple, the Davises, in Cusack Gardens. Having reported the youths repeatedly without success, Monroe promises them that he will sort the problem out personally and will get them off the streets. However, while Monroe is dealing with another incident, Mr. Davis dies of a heart attack after an altercation with the gang. Monroe is then urged by Brownlow to show 'zero tolerance' to the youths, and goes on an all-out offensive to get the gang's cars off the streets. However, this soon results in two of the youths petrol bombing Mrs. Davis' home. Smithy gets close to a nurse at the St Hugh's nurses' home while investigating reports of a stalker in the area, and Rickman attempts to help a woman who is being beaten up by her boyfriend, but Monroe's crackdown leads to both victims being left helpless as a lack of bodies hampers uniform.
8	"Scoop"	Eva Pope guest stars	Brian Farnham	Chris McWatters	1 February 2000
Conway encounters the "Sun Hill Angels" at a function, an escort service which Boulton believes is also dealing in drugs. Boulton convinces Conway to help him conduct a sting operation against the Angels, which goes terribly wrong when Conway's 'escort' turns out to be an undercover reporter, conducting her own sting on a senior police officer! To keep the story out of the paper, Boulton and Conway offer the newspaper a chance to be involved in the investigation into Andy Chapman, the owner of the Angels. Reporter Geraldine Sands disappears when she goes to Chapman's house to collect the drugs, leading Conway to go undercover again and find the location of the ringleader.
9	"Beasts"	Eve Best and Laura Howard guest star	Gwennan Sage	Andy Armitage	3 February 2000
Harker poses undercover alongside a hardcore group of animal rights activists, alongside Steve Burton, an old school friend from Liverpool. The group's leader, Ged Melling, is suspected to be planning some terrorist action. While undercover, Harker takes part in some protests and animal liberation actions, and begins to sympathise with the cause. Despite some misgivings, Harker proves himself to Melling, and discovers his plan to firebomb a local department store, leaving CID scrambling to catch the gang planting bombs. However, after a successful raid, the hopes of a conviction are quashed.
10	"Trusting the Enemy"	—	N. G. Bristow	Kathrine Smith	8 February 2000
Deakin is furious when a fourth drug dealer is assaulted in a number of days, a case which Beech was supposed to be investigating. Beech enlists Lennox and the pair are soon lead to a couple of possible suspects, the O'Brien brothers. Meanwhile, Rickman is dealing with a domestic involving the O'Brien's sister, Kelly. Daly informs his friend DI Baines of area drugs about the operation, unaware that Baines is the main man and the O'Brien's boss. Beech then tries to pin corruption charges on DI Baines, keen to get one over on his rival.
11	"On the Wagon"	Return of PC Jim Carver; Duncan Preston, Russell Hunter and Nadim Sawalha guest star	Jeremy Silbertson	Rod Lewis	10 February 2000
Carver returns to duty after undergoing treatment for his alcoholism. Unfortunately for him, he is paired with Smithy, and their first case involves alcohol! Attending what first appears to be a racial assault at a post office, Carver uncovers a scam to sell thousands of pounds worth of illegally imported alcohol to off-licences. Smith and much of the relief don't trust him, and after a Customs raid on an off-licence turns out to be an empty building, Carver must go out on his own, and on his bicycle, to find the person behind the scam.
12	"The Untouchables"	Neil Newbon guest stars	Moira Armstrong	A. Valentine	15 February 2000
Glaze witnesses a man being set alight on the Larkmead Estate, and becomes determined to solve the case. They identify a suspect's car from CCTV tapes, and Monroe discovers a witness to the incident, a girl named Rochelle, who identifies the suspect, Dominic Mileham in an identity parade. When she suddenly retracts her statement and accuses Danny of paying her to identify Mileham, it seems Mileham and his solicitor father will go free. Danny takes a big risk and convinces Rochelle to wear a wire.
13	"Streetwise"	Final appearance of DC Rod Skase; Alison Newman, Clive Carter and Terence Beesley guest star	Julian Holmes	Alison Fisher	17 February 2000
Skase is furious when witness intimidation leads to local villain Peter Gough walking free from an assault charge. Meanwhile, Hagen and Klein hunt Gough's son Danny for causing a car crash, along with Ashley Palmer, son of Peter Gough's girlfriend Kim. When Kim reports Ashley missing, scepticism over the tearaway's disappearance turns to fear for the nine year old's safety when his school bag is found in a local canal. Skase pressures local youth Jason Toomey into pointing the finger at Gough, and Skase is thrilled when he finds drugs in Gough's car. When a comment by Danny Gough leads Skase to realise he can't frame Gough for the abduction, he confesses to his misdeed. A furious Meadows tells Skase will be finished unless Ashley turns up alive, and when he discovers Danny may be responsible, he sets out to save Ashley and his career.
14	"Inside Straight"	John Benfield, Colin Hurley and Shaun Prendergast guest star	Chris Lovett	Chris Ould	22 February 2000
Beech and Deakin infiltrate a bent, high-stakes poker game, where the dealer, Steve Travis, has been offering drugs as a form of payment in cases where he has lost the game. In order to catch Travis in the act, Deakin disguises himself as an Irish businessman and challenges Travis to an all-or-nothing game, while Beech uses a minor player in the league who owes money to Travis as a coy to making Travis come unstuck. Meanwhile, the Drugs Squad's DI Carter is fazed as Meadows watches over the operation.
15	"Reasons to be Fearful"	Souad Faress guest stars	Brian Parker	Nigel Baldwin	24 February 2000
Boyden and Worrell arrest a man dealing drugs to schoolchildren, but soon discover that he is the son of a key witness to a case which Beech is desperately trying to close. Beech warns Boyden off as he is desperate to nail long-term enemy Jack Masters but Boyden has other ideas. After managing to get him off a dealing charge, the suspect then assaults one of Masters' informants, and again Beech manages to get him off; little does he know that he is using the case to clear his name completely.
16	"When the Bough Breaks"	Jessica Fox guest stars	Chris Lovett	Manjit Singh	29 February 2000
Boyden has a near miss on patrol when a van in front of him collides with a teenage girl. Her friend is identified by a mall security guard as a shoplifter, and after refusing to give her details, Boyden is shocked to discover the girl is Monroe's daughter Jackie. Boyden supports his boss through the ordeal, drawing on his own recent experience with his daughter Amy. As the relief rumour mill goes into overdrive, Monroe demands harsh action for Jackie to silence the officers claiming she will get off lightly. Monroe gets a reality check as he realises how badly fractured the relationship with his daughter is, and is determined to help her when she later goes missing. When Page finds drugs on Jackie's friend, Brownlow intervenes amidst media pressure about the fatal overdose of a teenage girl from Jackie's school, but has further media pressure to deal with when Jackie's arrest becomes public knowledge.
17	"Nightwork"	Katy Cavanagh guest stars	Brian Farnham	Ray Brooking	2 March 2000
Worrell goes undercover as a prostitute on Barrack Lane after a series of punters are assaulted and robbed, the most recent of which resulted in the punter being sliced across the face with a knife. She gets close to Leanne Gibbs, a former tom who is recently back on the game after quitting rehab; Ackland, however, has a troubled past with Leanne, and resents CID using her again for an undercover operation. Ackland finds herself in too deep and nearly blows Worrell's cover, which agonises Stanton and Meadows.
18	"Meltdown"	Gerry Cowper, JoAnne Good, Ian Puleston-Davies, Stuart Organ and Alex McSweeney guest star	Ged Maguire	Hugh Ellis and Tom Needham	6 March 2000
19	"Meltdown"	Gerry Cowper, JoAnne Good, Ian Puleston-Davies, Stuart Organ and Alex McSweeney guest star	Ged Maguire	Hugh Ellis and Tom Needham	7 March 2000
20	"Meltdown"	Gerry Cowper, JoAnne Good, Ian Puleston-Davies, Stuart Organ and Alex McSweeney guest star	Ged Maguire	Hugh Ellis and Tom Needham	9 March 2000
Part One: When Quinnan and Stamp are attacked on the Jasmine Allen Estate trying to get an overdose victim to hospital, Brownlow organizes a community initiative scheme to earn back the trust of the estate's residents. Quinnan decides to face his demons and prove to the relief he can deal with the youth club, but soon finds himself haunted by the memories of his stabbing. Things get worse when a camera donated to the youth club is stolen, and Quinnan is furious when he is confronted by Mick Glover, recently released just a year after his son stabbed Quinnan on his behalf. Estate backlash is rife when the overdosing girl Quinnan and Stamp tried to get to hospital dies, and Boulton discovers local dealers are giving uncut heroin away to school kids. When Worrell, working at a women's drug groups, finds another teenager overdosing, Brownlow demands action. Boulton launches and ill-fated raid on the prime target, causing Brownlow to order the removal of Quinnan and Worrell. Quinnan rejects an immediate removal and heads to a community disco, while he gets info about an attack on a nearby nightclub. While that proves to be a non starter, two incidents at the disco leave Quinnan in danger. Part Two: Boulton investigates the shooting of one of the youths from Quinnan's group. Convinced it is linked to the death of Donna Hunter, he searches the shooting victim's house, and Quinnan is disappointed to learn the girl has been dealing drugs. When Robbie Hunter disappears intent on finding his sister's killers, Quinnan conducts a private investigation, but finds himself attacked when he finds a badly beaten Robbie dying in a church crypt. Smith and Harker find Quinnan's car being joyridden but lose it when yobs on the estate interrupt the chase, but Stamp and McCann find it ablaze on wasteground. Jenny fears her husband has been killed, and while Brownlow reassures her and his troops, uniform believe he is deluded. When Boyden and Hagen find a burnt out body in a factory, the team are left fearing the worse. Part Three: Quinnan reels following his rescue and the death of Robbie Hunter the day before. When savings of his sister Donna are reported missing the day of her funeral, the mother of the teenagers discovers Robbie gave Donna the uncut heroin that killed her and stole her savings to get a gun for revenge. With AMIP convinced Robbie killed Hall, identified as the burnt out body discovered by Boyden and Hagen the night before, Boulton and Quinnan put their differences aside to prove AMIP wrong. Convinced Mick Glover is responsible for the murders of Hall and Robbie Hunter, they seek the help of the youth club to nail Boulton for a series of burglaries. Quinnan thinks he's found the evidence to nail Glover for murder, until a shocking turn of events robs them of the result.
21	"Kiss Off"	Condensed rebroadcast of the episodes '"Old Flame'", '"Push It'" and '"Kiss Off'" from 1999	Ian White	Elizabeth-Anne Wheal	14 March 2000
22	"Kiss Off"	Condensed rebroadcast of the episodes '"Old Flame'", '"Push It'" and '"Kiss Off'" from 1999	Ian White	Elizabeth-Anne Wheal	21 March 2000
Part One: Santini tries to convince his lover, Jess Orton, to set him up with some drug dealers – he wants out of Sun Hill, and DS Timpney, his friend in Area Drugs, has promised him a place in the squad if Santini can get him evidence on them. However, before he has the chance, the Ortons' club is firebombed, and Santini is shocked when one of the officers assigned by AMIP to investigate the explosion is his old nemesis, DS Rosie Fox. Fox is convinced that Santini is linked to the events in question, but her AMIP DCI, Richard Pallister, believes otherwise. When Santini manages to locate Jess Orton, he persuades her to make a false confession to bombing the club in order to gain the trust of the suspected drug dealers. Part Two: Santini is determined to find out whether Jess Orton has grassed on him, and when he breaks into her home to challenge her, he causes her to fatally fall down the stairs. Fox is ordered off the case by DCI Pallister and warned that if her actions directly resulted in her death, then she could be facing criminal charges. Vicky plugs DS Timpney for information, suspicious that Santini may not be telling the whole truth. Desperate to conceal his involvement with the Ortons, Santini and Fox find themselves captured by Sherman and Ferguson, and facing possible death. Fox believes she has a confession for Orton's murder and is attacked by Santini, but after their rescue, it's Santini's ex-girlfriend Hagen who nails him for the murder. These episodes do not appear on the Series 16 DVD box set.
23	"The Trial of Eddie Santini"	Guest appearances of PC Eddie Santini and DSs Rosie Fox and Liz Rawton; final appearance of DS Paul Timpney; Sharon Maughan and Peter de Jersey guest star	Ian White	Elizabeth-Anne Wheal	2 April 2000
Santini goes on trial at the Old Bailey accused of the murder of Jessica Orton, but tries to talk to CIB and implicate Quinnan and Rawton. A prison guard tells Santini that Sherman's drugs charges are being dropped in favour of conspiracy to murder Santini and Fox, who turns up dead in her hotel room after an apparent suicide. With Ferguson killed and Timpney taken on side by Sherman's heavies, Santini's trial starts falling apart. Hagen is discredited by her Sun Hill colleagues when she lies under oath and breaks down in the witness box after being caught out. With Santini found not guilty, he is warned by his recently released cellmate that he is in grave danger from Sherman's heavies.
24	"The Driver"	Todd Boyce guest stars	Tania Diez	Steve Handley	11 April 2000
Hagen goes undercover as the driver for a manager of a chain of massage parlours, Allison Spencer, who is suspected of running a prostitution racket for her uncle and old adversary of Meadows, Charlie Mayne. The DCI is intent on having Mayne extradited from Portugal. Hagen, subject to gossip from her colleagues over her performance at Santini's trial, struggles to get in with Spencer until Hagen saves her from an ambush. Piet Van Reissen, Spencer's boss and contact for her uncle, asks Spencer and Hagen to rob diamonds from a luxury house. When Van Reissen discovers the man who accompanied Spencer and Hagen to the heist is an undercover cop, Hagen takes drastic action to save his life. When Meadows reveals to Hagen that Van Reissen is going to double cross Mayne, an arrest team is scrambled to arrest all the targets as Mayne flies into the country.
25	"Protect and Survive"	First appearance of DC Mickey Webb; Frances Lima guest stars	John Davies	Paul Finch	13 April 2000
DC Mickey Webb arrives for his first night shift at Sun Hill, and assists an under strength uniform to track down dangerous prison escapee, Craig Ronson, who has served 8 years of life sentence for armed robbery and murder. Ackland warns the newer members of the relief that Ronson assaulted several officers when he was arrested in 1992. With Quinnan and Smith injured in separate mishaps, Ackland attends a break-in at a local sports complex and is confronted with an armed man who tries to attack her with a sledgehammer. Webb arrives and finds it to be Ronson's brother Colin, and uses his arrest to gain information as to Ronson's whereabouts. When Harker goes missing during a door-to-door on the Jasmine Allen, Rickman arrives to find him badly beaten – and herself confronted by an angry Ronson.
26	"Take It or Leave It"	Clare Higgins, Graham Pountney and John Warnaby guest stars	Peter Cregeen	David G. McDonagh	18 April 2000
Holmes investigates a suspected money-launderer named Terry Jowit, who is wanted by police in Scotland. Holmes discovers a cheque in Jowit's mail from an antiques dealer, which leads her to suspect that he buys expensive antiques with 'dirty money' as a means of laundering it. What Holmes doesn't count on is antique dealer Judy Ryan having a tape of Beech accepting a bribe from herself and Jowit, and Beech willing to do anything to keep it a secret. However, when Holmes confronts Beech, he threatens her with the evidence that she has illegally opened Jowit's mail. When Judy Ryan is later victim in a hit-and-run, Beech uses the opportunity to fit Jowit up – but he finds himself unsuspecting when Jowit tells Holmes' about his dodgy dealings, leaving the corrupt DS scrambling to cover himself.
27	"Over the Edge"	Kaye Wragg, Tom Georgeson, Edward Petherbridge, Ray Stevenson and Samantha Bond guest-star	Albert Barber	Chris Ould	20 April 2000
Brownlow and Mannion attend the panel for a Metropolitan Police hearing against a Sergeant who is charged with disobeying a direct order, which resulted in the career-ending injury of another officer. Mannion is easily convinced of Sgt Gartland's guilt, but Brownlow isn't so sure. When Ch Insp Caine struggles to explain the evidence presented against him, and corroborative evidence from Sergeant Tillman, who is based at another station, soon begins to sway the evidence in Gartland's favour. However, when the injured officer, PC Beckett, takes to the stand, her testimony sounds a little too much like she is trying to cover for Gartland's mistake, but Brownlow remains convinced of Gartland's innocence.
28	"Loyalty"	—	Geoff Harris	Rod Beacham	25 April 2000
Lennox is tasked with assisting Webb and Holmes on a drugs bust, but after meeting with an old friend, who is now an MP, he is more concerned with carrying out an unofficial investigation into a possible blackmail racket. When one of the suspects in the drugs bust manages to get away, Meadows and Webb are left furious. However, when Lennox explains to Meadows that he is acting on behalf of a friend, to the consternation of his colleagues, Meadows offers him support to investigate the detective agency involved in the blackmail scam, much to Webb's dismay. Lennox enlists Hagen to help out on an obbo.
29	"Wheels"	Desmond McNamara guest stars	Jo Shoop	Richard Stoneman	27 April 2000
Sun Hill has been given a new "crime car" for quick arrests and Boyden, Hagen and Proctor are chosen to crew it, much to the other officers' annoyance. Proctor is given a list of targets by DI Deakin and has been told to collar at least one to count towards his appraisal. However, Boyden is more concerned about his own collars. TSG have been assigned as cover as the relief are very low on manpower, but seem more determined to ruin the collars of the crime car than actually do any work themselves. When they dangerously vy for an arrest, disaster strikes. Meanwhile, Mannion arrives for a tour of the station just as the CAD room goes down owing to an electrical fault, a fault caused by someone whom Ackland later discovers to be a regular in the cells.
30	"Warm Bodies"	First appearance of Det Supt Steve Hodges	Michael Cocker	Gregory Evans	2 May 2000
31	"Warm Bodies"	First appearance of Det Supt Steve Hodges	Michael Cocker	Gregory Evans	4 May 2000
Part One: Stanton and Lennox are tasked with investigating a brutal assault outside a nightclub where the victim had pouches of what appear to be drugs stuffed into his mouth. The owner, Vince Carter, is a well-known figure on the plot, being the son of an old school villain, Frank Carter. Meanwhile, Boulton, bored of having to transcribe the tape of a murder confessions, assists when a young girl is run down by a car, and a witness claims that it was no accident. Boulton vigorously questions the witness when he discovers the man is blind, but soon finds himself believing that the incident was no accident. As his and Stanton's cases soon reveal a close link in Vince Carter, Stanton is tailed by an unknown assailant and run-off the road. Part Two: Boulton and Stanton's personal affairs threaten to get in the way of their investigation, as Stanton attempts to block out the events of the night before. Persuading Meadows to separate the two investigations, Holmes discovers another link in the cases in a second witness who is involved with both victims. However, refusing to have her statement recorded on tape, Boulton is forced to use the information to place a 'bomb' underneath the Carter family, hoping it will go off and that they will all implicate themselves in the separate crimes they have committed. Stanton tries to distance herself from a smitten Boulton, who is unaware that the "sick mother" she keeps visiting is actually CIB's Detective Superintendent Steve Hodges.
32	"Blurred Around the Edges"	—	Chris Lovett	Nigel Baldwin	9 May 2000
Cryer, Smithy and McCann attend the scene of an RTA, where they find a supply of cocaine as well as two firearms in the boot of one of the cars involved. Smithy accompanies one of the victims involved to hospital, where he discovers him to be a member of the regiment in which Smithy served during his time in the army. Smithy enlists one of his old army buddies, Tony Mitchell, to do a little digging on his behalf on the quiet. However, when a CID operation is blown out of the water, McCann reveals Smithy's intentions to Meadows. Realising that his old friend is heavily involved with the operation himself, Smithy is torn between his loyalties to an old friend and his loyalty to the job.
33	"Catch a Falling Star"	Hywel Bennett and Lynda Baron guest star	Clive Fleury	Isabelle Grey	11 May 2000
Conway jumps at the chance of helping Sixties pop idol Sadie Tyler after the draft of her autobiography is alleged to have been stolen by an obsessive fan. When the compere for a charity event Conway is organising drops out at the last minute, he asks Sadie to step in and perform instead. As Klein and Worrell continue to investigate obsessive super-fan Pete, a conversation between Conway and Sadie's manager Bob Warner reveals a shocking revelation – Pete believes he is the father of Sadie's daughter. As Conway's personal feelings get in the way of his professional judgement, Warner uses Conway's information to exact revenge on Pete.
34	"The Squad"	Nicholas Hoult, Bruce Byron and John Pickard guest star	Brian Farnham	Candy Denman	18 May 2000
With the Flying Squad suffering from a staff shortage, Stamp is seconded away as a temporary driver. He struggles to impress second-in-command DS Harrap, but senior officer DI Lomax continues to encourage him. Lomax is left furious, however, when a bank robbery they are trying to discreetly bust is ruined by a silent alarm and appearance by Klein and Hagen in the Area Car. Stamp's standing with Harrap declines when he loses a car that kidnaps the bank manager's family. Lomax works with Monroe to negotiate with the robbers, but when the ringleader is arrested, he refuses to reveal the location of the missing family. Stamp gets a chance at redemption when the family are tracked down at a remote country house, taking a major risk to draw out the kidnappers.
35	"White Lies"	Ellen Thomas and Mohammed George guest star	Christopher Hodson	Simon Sharkey	23 May 2000
A Barton Street PC is stabbed when he pursues two robbery suspects into Sun Hill. A black youth, identified as Mark Okin, is found beaten unconscious at about the same time. Carver is assigned to the Okin family in his first role as Family Liaison Officer, but further investigation by CID discovers Mark to be a suspect in PC Brennan's stabbing. Carver is horrified when Daly asks him to use his position of trust with the Okin family to collect evidence against Mark. Evidence soon mounts against John Wilson, the boyfriend of Mark's sister Amy, as Daly suspects that he is responsible for the robbery, stabbing PC Brennan, and assaulting Mark when he refused to take the rap for Brennan's stabbing.
36	"Search Me"	Martyn Lewis, Ofo Uhiara, Felix Dexter, Colin Spaull and David Sibley guest star	Don Leaver	Stephen Plaice	25 May 2000
Stop and search is resumed when there is an outbreak of street robberies. Mannion asks Brownlow to stand in for him for a TV interview, but he ends up shifting blame after two undercover journalists are subject to stop and searches. With the relief furious at their chief, Brownlow joins Conway on the beat in the CID car. They respond to a call and collar one of the street robbers, but when the other robber hops onto a bus and Brownlow gets uniform to stop the bus, he comes under public criticism, although uniform can only see the funny side.
37	"Love or Money"	Linda Lusardi and David Sterne guest star	Peter Cregeen	Neil Clarke	26 May 2000
Boulton and Holmes are left to pick up the pieces when the key witnesses in a robbery case refuse to give evidence. Holmes notices Boulton's change of attitude and suspects he may have found himself a woman. As word gets around the relief, Stanton attempts to cool things off with Boulton, which leaves him devastated. Meanwhile, Stanton's suspicions about Beech increase after she discovers his involvement with a credit card thief, Billy Bullock. Bullock pays Beech £1000 to destroy a CCTV tape of him stealing credit cards from a hotel conference. When Smithy and Hagen pursue Bullock, Beech's cover is nearly blown. When Bullock goes to make the drop, Stanton follows with the hope of catching Beech.
38	"Going Public"	—	Frank W. Smith	J. C. Wilsher	1 June 2000
Webb investigates the brutal beating of businessman Kevin Hewlitt, who is found unconscious in his kitchen by his wife, Sandra. The investigation provides little information as to the motive for the attack, and very little description of the assailant is given by those who saw him. CCTV footage shows Sandra having intercourse with another man in her car a week before Kevin's attack, and she later admits to Webb that she and her husband were no longer in love. Lennox tries to break the alibi of Hewlitt's business partner Paul Wilcox, convinced that he is somehow involved in the attack. Webb makes the decision to mix business with pleasure as he begins to fall for Sandra.
39	"Trust"	Grant Masters, Roger Blake and Richard Lintern guest star	Ken Hannam	Stephen Plaice	2 June 2000
40	"Trust"	Grant Masters, Roger Blake and Richard Lintern guest star	Ken Hannam	Stephen Plaice	June 2000
41	"Trust"	Grant Masters, Roger Blake and Richard Lintern guest star	Ken Hannam	Stephen Plaice	8 June 2000
Part One (A Sprat to Catch a Mackerel): When an apparent drug-related murder leads Operation Trident onto Sun Hill's patch, they suspect Yardie street gangs could be active in the area. A new scheme by Conway to encourage taxi drivers to help the police bears fruit when an overzealous cabbie brings a 'prisoner', Wesley Carter, to the station, saying he heard him making a drug deal. When Carter is linked to gangster Leroy Jones, Trident get Rickman to go undercover. As they reunite, Jones admits there are Yardies operating on the patch and he is trying to take on their drug running operation – but that a rival firm is trying to stop him – leaving Rickman caught in the crossfire of a drive-by shooting. Part Two (The Hare and the Hounds): To finance his buy-in to the Yardie drug dealing operation, Jones and his gang rob a building society, with Rickman forced to be getaway driver. Despite Trident being tipped off, the relief are left lying in wait for them at the wrong bank when Jones spots a cash in-transit van, with a special constable who tries to disarm Rickman being seriously injured. The relief buzzes with rumours that Rickman has "gone native", and she finds loyalties torn as she gets close to her target. However, she is given a harsh reality check when Jones is kidnapped by rival gang leader Touissant – who gives her an ultimatum. Part Three (The Deep Blue Sea): With Leroy Jones being held captive by rival dealer Touissant, Rickman is sent to make a second purchase from the syndicate. Rickman tails her contact to a tower block in the city, where Touissant's crew burst in and shoot the ringleader of "The Syndicate" and Rickman's contact. When Jones is ordered to kill Toussaint's main rival, Nathan Clarke, Rickman finds she has fallen for Jones and confesses her love and status as a police officer. When he abandons her, she goes back to Sun Hill before getting into Touissant's so SO19 can conduct a raid. With Jones a surprise member of the group, Rickman warns him to leave, but she finds herself as a hostage for a vengeful Touissant when SO19 storm in.
42	"Room Service"	Elaine Ives-Cameron guest stars	Chris Lovett	Gregory Evans	9 June 2000
Stanton is desperate to be discharged from the Beech case due to her love for Boulton, but Hodges assures her she is doing well. Boulton accepts a free night at a plush Docklands hotel, and invites Stanton to join him. Sure enough, as the pair settle down for their evening of luxury, an assault and robbery at the hotel sees Sun Hill officers arrive to investigate, and their night is ruined. The next day, CID investigates the theft of a laptop computer, and Beech is intrigued by reports of a "mystery blonde" sighted fleeing from the hotel. Horrified that Beech could have discovered their affair, Boulton and Stanton send Beech to the other side of London on a wild goose chase while they solve the case themselves.
43	"Soft Talking"	Ian Redford and Joanna Monro guest star	David Penn	Philip Gadwin	13 June 2000
Responding to an urgent call for assistance, Smithy arrives and has to deliver a baby in the street. Worried about the mother's condition, he investigates her background, and discovers a history of prostitution and drug abuse. When she vanishes from the hospital and abandons her newborn baby, Smithy has no choice but to inform her father, who subsequently reveals that he and his wife will be adopting the baby and bringing it up as their own. Smithy enlists the mother's help to catch her pimp, who is also dealing drugs in the process, by setting up an obbo to catch him in the act. However, the obbo goes badly wrong when the girl makes off with the drugs and tries selling them herself to local users.
44	"Beyond Conviction"	Cathy Tyson, Hugh Quarshie, Cyril Nri and Rupert Vansittart guest star	Michael Ferguson	Chris McWatters	27 June 2000
Klein and Hagen are called to a stabbing at a shopping centre, where a foreign aid worker has been attacked and left for dead. Initially, suspicion falls on a local youth, Wayne Stevens, who has previous for similar offences and was seen running away from the scene. However, when another witness claims she heard the victim shouting something before she was attacked, the pair find themselves on the trail of a Rwandan war criminal, Colonel Augustine Ngeze, who is wanted for mass genocide and rape by the UN. Klein's personal views begin to cloud his judgement when they fail to obtain any evidence to prove Ngeze's identity, so he sets up a chance meeting with a Rwandan national in an attempt to identify him. Notes: Cyril Nri would join the cast as Supt Adam Okaro in 2002.
45	"Whispers"	Final appearance of DC Tom Proctor; Judy Holt guest stars	Ken Grieve	Richard Stoneman	4 July 2000
Proctor, under pressure over his poor performance, decides to trap a burglar to avoid being transferred from Sun Hill after being told by Deakin that he has a new job lined up for him at the Isleworth CSU, who are looking for a DC to investigate domestic violence. Proctor's hospital interrogation of the victim nearly results in the man's death and a bust up between his wife and his secret girlfriend. Proctor goes undercover with Page in an attempt to catch the culprit, but a jealous Quinnan leaves the obbo and accidentally scares off a suspect, leaving Proctor's Sun Hill career in tatters. Meanwhile, when Hagen hears an Area Car from another station crash on the main set, her investigation uncovers the car being chased by the officers wasn't the only vehicle involved in the crash. Things escalate when one of the officers involved in the crash dies.
46	"Caught Short"	Rebecca Saire, Robert Cavanah, Emma Amos and James Coombes guest star	John Davies	Patrick Melanaphy	11 July 2000
Boulton is determined to bring down a known drug dealer by using his wife as an informant to gather information. However, when a raid on his property goes pear shaped, Boulton is less than pleased. When broker Neil Ramsey is discovered to be part of the scam, Lennox's loyalties are tested when he discovers that Ramsey is one of his wife's business associates. Lennox attempts to gain Webb's silence in order to protect his wife, but Boulton soon gets wind of what is going on and threatens that Lennox could lose his job if he tries to intervene. Lennox is forced to make a tough decision when he has Ramsey in his clutches – let him go and his wife is off the hook, or arrest him, and she is in deep trouble.
47	"Bad Habits"	Ginny Holder, Tania Emery and Robbie Gee guest star	Brian Farnham	Maxwell Young	18 July 2000
During a drugs raid on the Larkmead estate, Smithy wrongfully arrests a drugs rehabilitation worker for possession of illegal substances. The matter isn't helped by the fact that one of her colleagues has recently been employed by the station as an Arrest Referrals Officer. One of the girls arrested during the raid is later seen taking property off two men on a street corner, and is arrested again. It is revealed that she may know the whereabouts of misper Dawn South, who is a material witness in a trial against a violent pimp who has disappeared without trace. In order to catch those responsible, Smith is forced to confront his racial prejudice and team up with the counsellors. Notes: Tania Emery would join the cast as DC Kate Spears in November.
48	"Say It With Flowers"	—	Carol Wilks	David Hoskins	25 July 2000
Glaze and Holmes investigate the apparent suicide of local councillor Anthony Snape, and uncover a plot involving another councillor, Colin Cooper, and shady businessman Steven Trent, to pervert the course of justice by ensuring that massage parlours with links to the local freemasons' lodge are not raided. Glaze treads very close to the edge as he becomes determined to prove Brownlow is bent, as he is a member of the same lodge; even leaking information to a journalist who prints the story on his front page. When Glaze enlists Cooper's daughter as his star witness, it is soon discovered that Snape may not have committed suicide after all, and may be the victim of a very carefully planned and executed murder.
49	"No-One's That Honest"	Ken Campbell and Michael Jayston guest star	N. G. Bristow	Arthur Ellis	1 August 2000
Conway is astounded when an elderly man, Charles Arthur Cullun, a former police officer, turns up at the station with a suitcase containing half a million pounds, which he claims to have found on the street. Conway asks Hollis to count the money independently but he manages to count only £499,920. As Rickman counts the money again, Conway decides to do some digging, as surely no-one could be that honest. He discovers that the land on which the money was found has recently changed hands, and is now in possession of the Met. As the scam begins to show all of its true colours, Conway attempts to bargain with Cullun in order to get a deal which suits the both of them just perfectly.
50	"No Man's Land"	—	Chris Lovett	Simon Sharkey	8 August 2000
Cryer decides to take it upon himself to discover the identity of a body found on a roundabout, after Webb shows a less than caring attitude towards the case. His investigation leads him to believe that the deceased is Graham Dennis Anderson, a man wanted by the fraud squad for falsely selling pensions and other financial services to customers. Cryer is convinced that Anderson's business partner is in fact his alter-ego, who created Anderson as a way of escaping capture. However, his trail soon leads him to uncover one individual with several alter-egos – and as pieces of the what seems impossibly difficult jigsaw begin to piece together, he finds himself with a body it seems nobody can identify.
51	"Time to Kill"	Dominic Mafham guest stars	Jeremy Silberston	Carolyn Sally Jones	15 August 2000
When a woman is reportedly raped in an alleyway behind the Whitegate shopping centre, Lennox and Webb rake over the CCTV footage; however, they fail to find the woman captured on the footage. When it is revealed that she was lying to protect herself from her husband, a sinister cyberstalker who is dating and attacking women is discovered to be operating in Sun Hill. Ackland adopts a new "virtual" identity to trap him, but comes under the radar of a particularly annoying drunk who nearly scares the attacker off the scent. When the first obbo goes pear shaped, Ackland tries to pull together what little evidence the team have left in order to catch the attacker in the act, and organizes a second, more secure operation.
52	"Doppelganger"	Roger Walker guest stars	Helen Caldwell	Terry Hodgkinson	22 August 2000
Boyden is shocked to discover that someone has been impersonating him, raiding illegal poker games and pocketing all the cash, and decides to go undercover as a punter to trap him. However, during the operation, the technology provided by the yard goes haywire and all of the suspects manage to escape without capture. Meanwhile, as the phoney Boyden attacks and robs a prostitute, the real Boyden finds two Yardies on his case set out for revenge. As a second operation is organised, Boyden asks one of the players from the first game to go undercover and catch the fake police officers in the act. However, having gotten the Yardies on his side, Boyden organises sinister revenge for his fake counterpart.
53	"Lullaby"	Benedict Wong, Wendy Kweh and Tom Wu guest star	Jo Johnson and Paul Murton	Tom Needham and Graham Mitchell	25 August 2000
54	"Lullaby"	Benedict Wong, Wendy Kweh and Tom Wu guest star	Jo Johnson and Paul Murton	Tom Needham and Graham Mitchell	August 2000
55	"Lullaby"	Benedict Wong, Wendy Kweh and Tom Wu guest star	Jo Johnson and Paul Murton	Tom Needham and Graham Mitchell	1 September 2000
Part One: Smithy and Rickman attend a break in at a primary school and find a seven-year-old boy looking for food. Further investigation reveals that the boy has been living alone for three days and his parents are nowhere to be seen. Interviewing the family's friends and relatives, Deakin discovers that it is very unlike the parents to just disappear without trace, and CCTV footage shows a van watching the family's house on the night of the disappearance. Blood found in the family bedroom indicates the parents may have been harmed, but Deakin is furious when a racial attack on the restaurant where the boy's father works is found to have been investigated by Smithy over a week previously. Part Two: Smithy gets closer to Tim Tze as the search for his parents continues. His failure to investigate the attack on the Chinese restaurant correctly continues to hang over him, but when it appears that the man responsible had prior contact with the Tze family, Smithy finds he may well be in the clear. Deakin discovers that the restaurant has been put up for sale, but despite putting pressure on the owner, he refuses to give evidence. When Lenny Tze's car is found, and Tim finally gives up some information, Deakin uncovers details of an extramarital affair. As Jung Tze turns up alive and well, Smithy begins to wonder if the entire kidnapping has all been staged, until he and Tim are kidnapped. Part Three: Smithy and Tim Tze are held hostage, while the kidnappers make their demands – they want their money back, and Lenny Tze to deliver it. Trouble is, Lenny is nowhere to be seen, and Deakin suspects that Lenny may well be dead, when Jung Tze's story fails to hold up. Still troubled as to the reason why Lenny was given £500,000 from an unknown source, Deakin digs deeper and discovers that the boy's missing parents were involved in a money laundering operation, but that Lenny had planned to do a bunk with the cash and flee to Hong Kong. During a bungled move, Tim escapes. Deakin realises he must discover the whereabouts of Lenny's body if he is going to save Smithy in time.
56	"Gentle Touch"	Opening title sequence shortened, new titles font introduced; Flora Montgomery, Bob Barrett and Jonathan Wrather guest star	Laurence Moody	Alison Fisher, Tony Mulholland and Julian Spilsbury	5 September 2000
57	"Gentle Touch"	Opening title sequence shortened, new titles font introduced; Flora Montgomery, Bob Barrett and Jonathan Wrather guest star	Laurence Moody	Alison Fisher, Tony Mulholland and Julian Spilsbury	September 2000
58	"Gentle Touch"	Opening title sequence shortened, new titles font introduced; Flora Montgomery, Bob Barrett and Jonathan Wrather guest star	Laurence Moody	Alison Fisher, Tony Mulholland and Julian Spilsbury	12 September 2000
Part One: A terrified young woman, Emma Roberts, fears that she has become the victim of a stalker when paint is thrown over her car and her cat is killed in mysterious circumstances. After spending a night at her house, Hagen is convinced that she is making the entire story up for attention, and refuses to believe her. When Emma makes a claim of rape against her boss Brian Woods, Page investigates the case, and she finds that she too is being drawn into a nightmare world of unseen terror. Part Two: As her friendship with stalker victim Emma Roberts develops, Page is determined to find the stalker and starts to believe that he might be closer than she thought. After going out to dinner with Dave and Jenny, Emma arrives home to find her house has been broken into, and Page grows a little too close for comfort by inviting her to stay the night. When a past allegation made against Woods comes to light, Emma decides to press charges. Woods is released on bail, but soon turns up and tries to force his way into her house. He is subsequently arrested again and remanded in custody. Meanwhile, Polly is spooked when she starts receiving nuisance calls and a strange bunch of flowers are delivered to her. Suspecting she may have become the victim of the stalker, she looks to Emma to find comfort, but little does she know that her stalker is much closer to home than she imagined. Part Three: Page learns what it is like to be a victim of crime as the crazed stalker targets her further, making more nuisance calls, breaking into her flat and tearing up her clothes. Lennox and Glaze focus their investigation on Brian Woods, and discover he had an intriguing visitor in prison. Lennox is convinced that Woods is not the man responsible for the stalking, but Polly isn't so sure. As her suspicions turn to intrigue, Polly lets herself into Emma's house and finds a number of her missing photos that were stolen during the break in, but turns up a surprise lead when she finds Gina Reynolds lurking in the garden. Little does she know that not only is Emma her stalker, but also she has a mad plan to prove to Polly she loves her – by getting Jenny Quinnan away from Dave, leading Emma to take horrifying action.
59	"Some Like It Hot"	Del Henney guest stars	John Davies	Richard Stoneman	15 September 2000
Lennox is stung by comments about his physical fitness, and becomes determined to beat Brownlow at squash, as soon as he has arrested a villain from his past. When his flat is broken into and his personal photographs are stolen, he begins a campaign to get his nemesis arrested and put behind bars once and for all. Rickman is asked to attend the magistrates court to prevent a demonstration against a cabinet minister, but when he is sacked, she reaches out to him and helps him to recover some very important cabinet documents from Conway's office. Meanwhile, still absent from duty, Page reaches out to Quinnan after being stalked by Emma Roberts, but he rebuffs her due to the injuries sustained by Jenny in her attack by Roberts.
60	"First Impressions"	First appearances of PCs Roz Clarke and Ben Hayward; Norman Eshley and Tracy-Ann Oberman guest star	Michael Owen Morris	Rod Lewis	19 September 2000
61	"First Impressions"	First appearances of PCs Roz Clarke and Ben Hayward; Norman Eshley and Tracy-Ann Oberman guest star	Michael Owen Morris	Rod Lewis	22 September 2000
Part One: Probationary PCs Ben Hayward and Roz Clarke arrive for their first day at Sun Hill, and are subjected to a series of wind-ups by the relief. Boyden tricks Clarke into thinking that he has hit a pensioner in the surveillance van, while Stamp and Quinnan subject Hayward to the ride of his life in the area car. Hayward manages to stop a curb-crawler who evades capture, but his arrest is thwarted by Hollis. Meanwhile, Hagen and Rickman spin Clarke a story about 'nipper' Cryer, the famous bum-pinching sergeant, and Klein gets Worrell to pretend to be a dead body in order to wind up Hayward. However, the joke backfires when an angry and upset Hayward is punched in the face by Stamp. Part Two: Hayward and Clarke try to redeem themselves after a disastrous first day, and decide to exact revenge on the wind-up merchants on the relief. Ackland is furious to learn that half of the relief are involved in the wind-ups, but is even more upset to discover Boyden played the worst trick of all. Meanwhile, after a curb-crawling class at the station, Hayward, Clarke and Page investigate when a tom is burgled and the ashes of her best friend are stolen. Hayward and Clarke believe not only have they discovered who is responsible, but also they may have cracked the identity of her best friend's murderer; however, they are brought back to earth by a tragic twist. Clarke exacts the ultimate revenge on Klein after she discovers he fancies her.
62	"Old Enemies and New Friends"	Guest appearance of ex-DS Ted Roach; Antony Cotton and George Costigan guest star	Ken Grieve	Len Collin	26 September 2000
63	"Old Enemies and New Friends"	Guest appearance of ex-DS Ted Roach; Antony Cotton and George Costigan guest star	Ken Grieve	Len Collin	29 September 2000
Part One: When the relief carry out a routine raid on a nightclub, The Pink Cockatoo, Carver is suspicious after he suspects that a face from his past was present at the scene. Later, he stops a driver who appears to be a little bit worse for wear, and discovers that it is none other than his former CID colleague Ted Roach. Carver encourages Roach to provide information on Mickey Owen, the owner of the club, in return for being let-off the drink-driving charge. However, his leak to the police soon turns out to be the driving force behind a harsh beating, warning him not to give evidence. Meanwhile, Quinnan uncovers a body on the marshes, and Lennox discovers a link between the deceased and The Pink Cockatoo. Part Two: Recovering in hospital, Roach agrees to tell Carver everything he knows about Mickey Owen, but asks that the police protect his long-time friend and former informant, Roxanne, from Mickey's clutches. Meanwhile, as investigations continue, Lennox discovers that the body is that of Phillip Macey, one of Roxanne's best friends, who disappeared without trace in the 1990s after a gig at The Pink Cockatoo. Realising that Owen must have been responsible for his death, Roxanne agrees to help Meadows set up a sting operation to catch Owen in the act. Roach's old-school police methods begin to yield results, much to the delight of Carver, but before they can catch Mickey red-handed, tragedy strikes. This episode was originally produced as one feature-length single episode of 90 minutes (80 without adverts), but was broadcast in two parts due to a football match overrunning. This resulted in Part Two being only 36 minutes long, which was shown in a 40 minute timeslot (20:00-20:40).
64	"Beech I"	Linda Lusardi, Barnaby Kay, Nicky Ladanowski, Dugald Bruce Lockhart, David Ross and Ken Drury guest star	Ian White, Michael Cocker and Alan Macmillan	Clive Dawson, Steve Griffiths, Neil Clarke and Gregory Evans	3 October 2000
65	"Beech I"	Linda Lusardi, Barnaby Kay, Nicky Ladanowski, Dugald Bruce Lockhart, David Ross and Ken Drury guest star	Ian White, Michael Cocker and Alan Macmillan	Clive Dawson, Steve Griffiths, Neil Clarke and Gregory Evans	October 2000
66	"Beech I"	Linda Lusardi, Barnaby Kay, Nicky Ladanowski, Dugald Bruce Lockhart, David Ross and Ken Drury guest star	Ian White, Michael Cocker and Alan Macmillan	Clive Dawson, Steve Griffiths, Neil Clarke and Gregory Evans	6 October 2000
Supping With the Devil: Beech meets businessman Howard Fallon at a poker game. When Beech's winnings turn out to be counterfeit notes, he confronts Fallon, who offers him a substantial bribe to find out who hijacked one of his lorries, and to get to the stolen shipment back before customs or the police seize it. Daly becomes suspicious when Beech tries to get involved with the investigation, but one of Daly's snouts points the finger at a former employee of Fallon's, and the driver of the missing truck. As the missing shipment is safely returned, and with Daly off his back, it looks like the beginning of a beautiful friendship between Beech and Fallon. Touch and Go: Boulton and Stanton investigate the vicious attack on Rachel Booker, a dancer at one of Howard Fallon's clubs, and Beech is furious when Fallon reveals his mobile number is among her possessions. Boulton and Stanton find the main suspect is Warren Askew, who was obsessed with Rachel, but he doesn't appear to be responsible. When Boulton tries calling the phone numbers in Rachel's diary, he is shocked when Beech answers the phone. Beech makes an excuse that he tried to pick up Rachel in a bar, and begs Boulton to overlook the evidence. Desperate to get the case closed, Beech then plants evidence to frame Askew that leads to his arrest for murder when Rachel dies of her injuries. Fake Fur: Following the death of prime suspect Warren Askew in custody, Stanton urges Deakin not to close the case of Rachel Booker's murder immediately. A series of mysterious numbers found in Rachel Booker's diary are later revealed by Scotland Yard to be a set of number relating to a number of bank accounts. One of Rachel's fellow dancers, Lynette, is persuaded by Boulton and Stanton to tell them exactly what is going on. They soon discover that Vickery's, a fur export company owned by Howard Fallon and Ray Bazzini, is actually a front for a major money laundering operation. In an attempt to uncover further information, Stanton and Boulton go on a double date with Beech and his girlfriend, Maggie Lyons. When the case is subsequently turned over to the NCS, Stanton covertly photographs Beech meeting in secret with Fallon and Bazzini. Boulton opens up to Stanton after resuming their relationship, and he stuns her with a proposal, but her loyalties to CIB leave her conflicted between her undercover op and her beau.
67	"In Safe Hands"	Amanda Mealing and Robert Boulter guest star	Jo Johnson	A. Valentine	13 October 2000
Harker is volunteered to work with a young offenders group in Canley, and immediately takes a shine to Carmel Kendrick, the organiser of the group. When Carmel's foster son, 14-year-old Scott, goes off the rails, Harker steps in to try to defuse the situation. When one of Scott's friends is found dead from a heroin overdose, Harker discovers that despite previous claims that he is clean, Scott and his friend have been drug running for one of the major dealers on the Bronte. However, the situation is complicated further when Harker discovers that Scott and Carmel have been sleeping together, leaving him conflicted about job responsibility and his friendship with Carmel. Meanwhile, Stanton and Boulton try to locate missing witness Lynette, while Beech attempts to prevent this due to his corrupt connections. This episode was missing from DVD releases by Shock due to copyright issues. However, this was sorted and released on copies by Viavision in 2022.
68	"Beech II"	Final appearance of DS John Boulton; Linda Lusardi, Barnaby Kay and Nicky Ladanowski guest star	Derek Lister, Peter Cregeen and Richard Holthouse	Steve Griffiths	17 October 2000
69	"Beech II"	Final appearance of DS John Boulton; Linda Lusardi, Barnaby Kay and Nicky Ladanowski guest star	Derek Lister, Peter Cregeen and Richard Holthouse	Steve Griffiths	20 October 2000
70	"Beech II"	Final appearance of DS John Boulton; Linda Lusardi, Barnaby Kay and Nicky Ladanowski guest star	Derek Lister, Peter Cregeen and Richard Holthouse	Steve Griffiths	24 October 2000
Find The Lady: Stanton tries to find out if Boulton is working with Beech, who is furious when Fallon confesses to him that his associate Ray Bazzini was responsible for Rachel Booker's death and missing star witness Lynette knows this. When Lynette resurfaces, Boulton immediately hides her in a safe house; Beech informs Fallon the location, but Lynette escapes from the thugs who are sent to attack her. As Stanton prepares to confess all to Boulton about her undercover op, he gets a phone call from Beech. They meet at a construction site, where Beech admits he has been working for Fallon, and reveals that it was him who gave up Lynette's location. He tries to convince Boulton to help him out, but an angry Boulton refuses, with the resulting fight ending in tragedy. Fifty-Fifty: Quinnan and Carver find the body of Boulton at the construction site. Sun Hill is in shock, none more so than a devastated Stanton, who is suspicious when Beech lies about meeting him the night before. The Area Major Incident Pool arrive to investigate Boulton's death, and their subsequently investigations eventually lead them to Beech, who mysteriously disappears without trace. Maggie Lyons tries to smuggle Beech out of the country at the airport, but he cancels his escape after spotting AMIP outside the terminal. Knowing that his time is gradually running out, Beech weighs up his options, leading him to a stunned Stanton. The River: After Beech hands himself into CIB, Stanton is horrified when Beech convinces Hodges to ensnare Fallon, along with two Drugs Squad officers on Fallon's payroll, in exchange for a full confession of his crimes. He meets with DI Tasker and DS Garrard to arrange a double cross, working out that Fallon must have given him up to AMIP. After being caught with a phone while attending the funeral of Boulton, Hodges threatens to pull the deal, until Beech falsely offers up the Drugs Squad DCI. Stealing the money for a drug deal, Beech attends a warehouse with Fallon, who tries to kill him. When Tasker and Garrard rescue Beech, they tie up Fallon and his associates, before Beech turns on his rescuers. When shots ring out, CIB and SO19 storm in, with Hodges and Stanton left furious when Beech is nowhere to be seen.
71	"All Fall Down"	Final regular appearances of Ch Supt Charles Brownlow and DSs Don Beech and Claire Stanton; final appearances of DI Chris Deakin, DS Geoff Daly, DC Kerry Holmes and Det Supt Steve Hodges; Linda Lusardi, Mark McGann and Timothy Bateson guest star	Michael Cocker	Hugh Ellis and Chris Ould	27 October 2000
72	"All Fall Down"	Final regular appearances of Ch Supt Charles Brownlow and DSs Don Beech and Claire Stanton; final appearances of DI Chris Deakin, DS Geoff Daly, DC Kerry Holmes and Det Supt Steve Hodges; Linda Lusardi, Mark McGann and Timothy Bateson guest star	Michael Cocker	Hugh Ellis and Chris Ould	31 October 2000
Part One: CIB sweep into Sun Hill and suspend the entire CID department with immediate effect, with all of their ongoing cases subsequently transferred to Barton Street. Lennox, who is out when they arrive and shows up while they are searching the office, is horrified when he discovers that Stanton is a CIB mole. As the detectives are interviewed to establish their connection to Beech, Meadows hurriedly calls in some favours at Scotland Yard. Mannion demands Brownlow resign to make a strong statement to the public and media, and after arguing the decision with Conway, he decides to make the tough decision after a heart to heart with Monroe. Meanwhile, Beech prepares to go into hiding; he goes off to meet Maggie at a shopping centre, unaware Stanton is hot on his tail. Part Two: Beech manages to evade Stanton yet again, but she takes Maggie Lyons in for questioning; Beech recruits a crooked lawyer to represent her and perform other useful services for him. Beech then radically overhauls his image in the hope that he is not recognized, obtains a false passport and buys a quantity of diamonds with the money he stole from Howard Fallon, as he prepares to flee the country with Maggie. Meanwhile, Sun Hill officers continue to be interviewed by CIB, and although no firm connection with Beech can be established, it's the end of the line for Deakin and Daly, while a furious Holmes requests an immediate transfer; Meadows manages to survive the cull due to his contacts in the Yard, much to the dismay of Deakin. Maggie changes her mind about following Beech, and he boards a flight to Australia alone, while Stanton vows to make Beech pay for Boulton's death.
73	"On the Hook"	First appearances of Supt Tom Chandler, DI Alex Cullen, DSs Debbie McAllister and Vik Singh, and DCs Kate Spears and Paul Riley; Sian Webber guest stars	Ged Maguire	Elizabeth Anne-Wheal	3 November 2000
74	"On the Hook"	First appearances of Supt Tom Chandler, DI Alex Cullen, DSs Debbie McAllister and Vik Singh, and DCs Kate Spears and Paul Riley; Sian Webber guest stars	Ged Maguire	Elizabeth Anne-Wheal	7 November 2000
Part One: The new CID team arrives at Sun Hill, led by the new station commander, Supt Tom Chandler. His pally attitude with the relief doesn't go down well with everyone, with the likes of Cryer, Smith and Meadows unconvinced. The DCI himself feels the pressure of facing a disciplinary board hearing following the Beech scandal. New DI Alex Cullen is assigned to head the investigation of an apparently racially motivated harassment of a local family, along with cocky DC Paul Riley and hard-faced DS Debbie McAllister, after complainant Frank Griffiths says Meadows had history with Helen Freeley, whose sons are suspected of racially abusing Griffiths and his family. As facts become apparent, events take a dramatic turn. Meanwhile, new arrival DS Vik Singh dishes the dirt immediately by warning his new colleagues that McAllister is overcompensating for a recent promotion to DS, while telling them that Cullen is in Chandler's pocket. Part Two: Meadows is furious when Chandler demands he replace Cullen as Senior Investigating Officer following the murder of Darren Freeley. Meadows is desperate to make the breakthrough as quickly as possible, aware that Chandler will be coming to his discipline board later in the week. Meadows questions the prime suspects, two friends of Melody Griffiths who were seen leaving the scene, KJ Leonard and Oz Benson. Traces of Leonard's skin are found on Darren Freeley's knuckles, and although Oz Benson admits they were there and were angry with Freeley, they didn't kill him. When Rickman finds the murder weapon, the forensic evidence points to an unlikely killer.
75	"A Girl's Best Friend"	Stephen Bent guest stars	Bruce McDonald	Damian Wayling	10 November 2000
Quinnan finds the body of Dennis Quigley, a man who has died of a heart attack in his car. While delivering the man's personal effects to his wife, Quinnan is mortified to find they include a gift to the man's mistress, a woman named Alice. Trying to do a good deed, Quinnan resolves to deliver the gift to its intended recipient, and manages to locate Alice and give her the gift. However, things become much more complicated when his wife Jenny discovers the gift and thinks he's having an affair, while CID discover that the dead man is wanted by Interpol for diamond smuggling. Suspecting the package that Quinnan handed over may well be a shipment of uncut diamonds smuggled in from Antwerp, Cullen is left dismayed after realising the evidence has been lost.
76	"Carnival"	Delroy Atkinson guest stars	Jamie Nuttgens	Jim Guthrie	14 November 2000
Glaze is sent undercover to attempt to infiltrate a drugs ring when they become involved with a high-flying player, Bunny Small, who has been a target of the area drugs squad for some time. Meadows seizes the opportunity to try to win some brownie points for Sun Hill by not only nailing three small-time local dealers, but also finally getting evidence to put Small away. During an obbo, Glaze and McCann end up at loggerheads over each other's attitudes to policing, but decide they must work together to get the best result. When Small is murdered during the obbo, NCS arrive to crucify Glaze, McCann and Meadows over their conduct. Determined to get the station a much needed good result, Glaze goes back undercover, but has a brush with death during St Pauls Carnival. Afterwards, he and McCann both make big decisions about their future in the force.
77	"Behind Enemy Lines"	90-minute special; Paul Jerricho guest stars	Rob Bailey	Manjit Singh	17 November 2000
While out on a crime prevention sweep, Spears visits a local building society, only to be caught up in an armed robbery. Smithy tries to stop the robbers as they make their escape and is also taken hostage. As SO19 units surround the building, Conway and Chandler arrive to negotiate with the two robbers, Dwight and Rollo. A tense standoff ensues, and Smith realises the men are ex-soldiers, and that they had help from one of the bank employees. When Rollo shoots Dwight during an argument, Chandler orders SO19 to storm the building despite Conway's objections, putting Spears at further risk.
78	"A Gathering Storm"	Noel Clarke and Reggie Yates guest star	Gwennan Sage	Nigel Baldwin	21 November 2000
Smith and McCann investigate a robbery involving local youth Lennie Cox. When they arrive at his flat, they find him liasing with Jurgen Holz, a Neo-Nazi criminal wanted by Interpol for drug trafficking charges. Holz manages to escape, but Smith catches up with Cox, and he is cornered by a group of black youths. As the pair catch up with Holz, they give chase, but Smith finds himself in a radio deadspot. He is then suspected of having a racist motive when he fails to respond to an urgent assistance call from McCann, who is badly beaten by a gang of neo-Nazi skinheads. Determined to clear his name, Smith veers dangerously close to compromising an SO10 undercover operation to arrest Holz.
79	"Sorted"	Phaldut Sharma guest stars	Ed Fraiman	Peter Lloyd	24 November 2000
Klein spends all night DJing at a local nightclub, and lies to Cryer when he skips work the next day. When his car is broken into, his possessions are handed in at the station, with Cryer soon finding out what really happened. Smith has a touch of toothache and gets Rickman to take him to A+E. Klein, forced to come by an angry Cryer, is paired with Rickman. Klein finds his day is getting worse by the minute as Singh and McAllister investigate an abduction and extortion case involving two people who were at the club the night before. When both accuse Klein of using drugs at the club, he battles to clear his name and find the missing girl before it is too late.
80	"Team Colours"	Dominic Power guest stars	Brian Parker	Stephen McAteer	1 December 2000
Spears and Worrell chase a suspect from the scene of a violent assault. They discover that the victim, Donna Elliot, is the sister of Frank and Peter Elliot, two insurance brokers suspected of being the ringleaders of a post-match fight that has been arranged between two rival gangs of football fans. With Sun Hill as the venue, Chandler assigns Cullen to the case, but Meadows is determined to show him up by cracking the case himself using a teenage assault suspect and member of the Larkmead Crew as an informant. When Cullen and Lennox discover Meadows' informant has lied to him about the gang's intentions, CID and uniform rush to head off the mob before they attack an Asian marketplace.
81	"Two Way Burn"	—	Brian Parker	Stephen Handley	5 December 2000
Webb and Spears investigate when a house fire traps two young girls, who end up in hospital in a critical condition. Meadows is later assigned to lead the investigation when suspicion soon falls on a loan shark who was seen outside the house just before the fire. When witnesses place him elsewhere at the time of the fire, suspicion then falls on the girls' father; however, questioning him is delayed when one of his daughters succumbs to her injuries. With Webb convinced of his guilt, Spears clashes with him when she suspects the mother is to blame. After cracking the case, Webb and Spears grow closer.
82	"Friends"	Final appearance of PC Gary McCann	Gwennan Sage	Candy Denman	12 December 2000
Boyden spearheads a raid on a brothel, which uncovers several illegal immigrants from Croatia being forced to work as prostitutes. The owner of the premises, Carson, agrees to reveal who is bringing the girls into England in exchange for a lesser charge. However, on the way to court, the police van is ambushed and Carson is kidnapped. After the car used in the ambush is found with blood stained seats, it is suspected Carson has been killed. Carson's lawyer, Doyle, eventually agrees to set up a meeting with Luca, and Boyden sets up a surveillance operation on a locker. Meanwhile, McCann agonises as he waits for word on a transfer that hinges on the result of his Sergeant's exams.
83	"Bad for Your Health"	Jim McManus, Trevor Byfield and Joel Beckett guest star	Roger Tucker	Alison Fisher and Julian Spilsbury	15 December 2000
84	"Bad for Your Health"	Jim McManus, Trevor Byfield and Joel Beckett guest star	Roger Tucker	Alison Fisher and Julian Spilsbury	19 December 2000
Part One: Page and Hayward attend a disturbance at a pub and find the landlord and one of his regulars being beaten up by three masked men. Meanwhile, Stamp, Quinnan and Klein attend the scene of a second beating, another three masked men attacking local villain Frank McBride outside the back of his club. Realising the incidents could be connected, Hayward investigates, and discovers a turf war between two rival gangs of cigarette smugglers. As the evidence against the two rival firms stacks up, Klein finds himself in trouble when he tries to buy a mixing desk from his favourite DJ, Johnny Margolis, and ends up abducted by the McBride gang, but a freak accident leaves Tony McBride dead and Klein seriously injured. Part Two: After noting Klein missing from morning parade, Quinnan and Stamp find him unconscious and badly injured in the back of the crashed van belonging to the now-deceased Tony McBride and his cigarette smuggling gang. With McAllister determined to prove that Klein is corrupt, Boyden and the relief race to find evidence to clear his name. As Klein continues to recover in hospital, Hayward suspects that missing DJ Johnny Margolis may seem to be the key to the whole mystery, and he is found trying to escape from three thugs. Boyden searches McBride's house, and an obbo is soon set up to catch the cigarette smugglers red-handed. Boyden is stunned when he works out who is responsible for the smuggling ring.
85	"The Night Before......The Morning After"	Christmas Special; Matt Willis guest stars	Chris Lovett	Richard Stoneman	22 December 2000
86	"The Night Before......The Morning After"	Christmas Special; Matt Willis guest stars	Chris Lovett	Richard Stoneman	29 December 2000
Part One: Smithy becomes a knight in shining armour for a shop assistant when he and Rickman apprehend a shoplifter, with a little help from Santa! The shoplifter is suspected of brutally assaulting a shop assistant in the same store. Lennox bonds with the suspect due to the boy being from Glasgow, but Webb's hatred for Christmas leads to him refusing to help the boy out, although he attempts to track down a reported accomplice to the theft. Meanwhile, McAllister maliciously ruins Hollis's plans for the Sun Hill Christmas Party, by getting the pub landlord's son arrested on drugs charges. When they reschedule at a nightclub, the party turns sour and a fight breaks out. Quinnan, having argued with Jenny about her hopes of moving to Colchester, acts on his feelings for Page after Hagen's teasing about Page and Stamp being close. Part Two: Sun Hill returns to normal after the Christmas break, although Quinnan and Page act suspiciously after their pre-Christmas encounter. As the pair try to rekindle their affair, Lennox and Webb continue investigating the assault on the shop assistant, and discover that the story concocted by the pair of crooked security guards is completely phoney, who may be responsible for the attack. Monroe attempts to build bridges with the landlord of the Elcott Arms, while Riley nearly lets slip that McAllister was responsible for the sabotage. Meanwhile, Hagen and Page have a minor PolAcc in the yard, and Hagen later catches Quinnan and Page getting intimate in the back of the arrest van.
