= List of Two Pints of Lager and a Packet of Crisps episodes =

This is a list of episodes of the British television sitcom, Two Pints of Lager and a Packet of Crisps, a BBC series written by Susan Nickson that ran for 9 series from February 2001 to May 2011. It is set in Runcorn, Cheshire and is about the lives and relationships of five twentysomethings.

== Series overview ==
Series
Series	Episodes	Originally released	
Series	Episodes	First released	Last released
1	6	26 February 2001	2 April 2001
2	6	15 April 2002	20 May 2002
3	10	23 February 2003	27 April 2003
4	8	15 February 2004	4 April 2004
5	14	4 January 2005	5 April 2005
6	10	26 February 2006	30 April 2006
7	8	13 January 2008	9 March 2008
8	8	15 March 2009	10 May 2009
9	6	26 April 2011	24 May 2011

== Episodes ==
=== Series 1 (2001) ===
No. overall	No. in series	Title	Directed by	Written by	Original release date
1	1	"Fags, Shags and Kebabs"	Gareth Carrivick	Susan Nickson	26 February 2001
When Donna tells Janet that she is looking for a boyfriend, Janet asks her partner, Jonny, to persuade his best friend, Gaz, to go on a date with Donna. Jonny convinces him when Janet threatens to reveal that his favourite film is Titanic. A double date results in Janet, Jonny and Donna all storming out of The Mayhew pub. In the local kebab shop, Jonny gives Gaz's phone number to Donna and she goes to his flat. Donna thinks she made a mistake when she finds his large collection of pornographic magazines, but despite arguing, she and Gaz have sex. Janet's student friend, Louise, gets a job as a barmaid at The Mayhew, but soon quits when her boss offers her a bag of peanuts in exchange for sex.
2	2	"Spunk"	Gareth Carrivick	Susan Nickson	5 March 2001
Donna is waiting for Gaz to call her. She finally goes to see him and they agree to have lots of uncommitted sex. But their plans backfire when Gaz is invited to Sunday lunch at the Henshaws', where Donna's mother, Flo, and flirtatious younger sister, Katie, make him feel uncomfortable. On Gaz's advice, Jonny starts to be meaner to Janet to improve their relationship, but fails miserably. After Gaz convinces him to follow his plan, Jonny goes missing the next day. After Gaz tells a worried Janet that it was his idea, she throws the television remote at him and breaks his nose. He goes to hospital where he finds Jonny, who has been concussed by an old woman who hit him when he offered to escort her across the road. Jonny and Janet make up in the hospital, but she punches him when she finds out that he showed Gaz polaroid photos of her in a nurse's uniform. Meanwhile, Louise discovers that she has put on weight for the first time since she was 14 and goes on a diet, but her weight obsession is cured when she finds stretch marks around her legs.
3	3	"Bone with the Wind"	Gareth Carrivick	Susan Nickson	12 March 2001
Gaz is worried that Donna may be planning to move in after he finds her toothbrush in his flat. Janet starts to think Jonny no longer fancies her, and tries various ways to improve her sex life with Jonny, such as buying lingerie, which only results in Jonny becoming suspicious. Janet forces Jonny out of the house so she and Donna can make him a romantic meal. In the pub, Gaz and Jonny decide that Donna and Janet are each having affairs and go to confront the man they believe is with their girlfriends, whom they have dubbed “Pedro”, with socks containing eggs, only to find they were doing it all for Jonny. After falling for a camp gay man, Louise decides to make the best of the situation and becomes a fag hag.
4	4	"Angry Wangry"	Gareth Carrivick	Susan Nickson	19 March 2001
Janet wants to become demure and educated, so she decides to try to become a student. She is invited to read at a poetry meeting by Louise's student friend Cameron. Jonny is against the idea, but Janet tries hard to impress Cameron. However, her reading merely consists of song lyrics and is received very badly by the audience. Donna vows to be less angry after being criticised by Flo for her angry response to Flo telling her that she posed nude in pornographic magazines. Gaz feels that he is no longer attractive to women and goes on the pull, only to be rejected and then caught by Donna. Jonny is chatted up by two attractive girls and tries to get them to go away, but they like his hard-to-get attitude and offer to “lez up”. Jonny rejects them and goes home to watch ER. Donna tries to be calm when she walks in on Gaz sniffing Flo's hair as Flo fondles him. After Gaz advises Donna to change her appearance, she pushes him in the canal.
5	5	"Lard"	Gareth Carrivick	Susan Nickson	26 March 2001
Jonny is worried that he is falling in love with Louise, but that fear ends when he kisses her and notices she tastes of lard. Donna redecorates Gaz's flat, resulting in an argument between them because it is too feminine for him, but they later make up. Janet tries to become a comedian, but fails miserably; until she finds out about Jonny kissing Louise and her insults about the rest of the group are found amusing.
6	6	"Ugly Babies"	Gareth Carrivick	Susan Nickson	2 April 2001
Janet and Donna both think that they might be pregnant, but Janet is reluctant to tell Jonny. Jonny begins to want more to happen in his life, but a pony ride and a train ride do not cheer him up. Janet learns from a pregnancy test that she is not pregnant, just as Jonny starts to come around to the idea, but they are both relieved. Donna becomes convinced that she is pregnant. Louise is disappointed when she realises that she is stupid.

=== Series 2 (2002) ===
No. overall	No. in series	Title	Directed by	Written by	Original release date
7	1	"On the Blob"	Gareth Carrivick	Susan Nickson	15 April 2002
Janet and Jonny come home to find Donna who confides in Janet about her apparent pregnancy. Having found him running through the streets in his underwear, Jonny reassures Gaz, as Donna had told him that she may be pregnant. Donna finds out that she got her dates mixed up and has her period and is not pregnant. Gaz had been horrified at the thought of becoming a father, but is disappointed at finding out that Donna is not pregnant - as he was starting to look favourably on it as he could become responsible and stable. However, Janet makes him realise he can do this by having an adult relationship with Donna. Gaz then offers to take Donna on a date to 'the finest drinking establishment in town', although to Donna's disappointment this is having a can of lager in Gaz's garage. After having a dream in which Donna is pregnant, Louise believes that she is a psychic and, on her advice, Jonny becomes a mime - although this does not last long. Louise accepts that she is not psychic after she finds out that Donna is not pregnant.
8	2	"Bungle"	Gareth Carrivick	Susan Nickson	22 April 2002
Jonny wins £1000 on a scratchcard and everybody wonders what he will do with it (although they mostly have daft ideas). Donna and Gaz finally have a real conversation in the pub after Flo tells Donna that she should hire a conversational prostitute so that Gaz will not leave her. Janet throws a dinner party to celebrate Jonny's scratchcard win under the false assumption that Jonny will spend the money on an engagement ring. She is deeply disappointed when she finds out otherwise, as is Donna when Gaz says he agrees with Jonny on the stupidity of marriage. Donna and Gaz make up that night. Louise has a new posh boyfriend, James, who is desperate to have sex with her and reveals while drunk at the dinner party that he is a virgin (the opposite of what Louise claimed). Disappointed at first, Louise changes her mind when she realises that she can get him to do anything she wants. Jonny reveals he has used the money to hire children's TV character Bungle, who comes with a free bouncy castle.
9	3	"Dirty Girls"	Gareth Carrivick	Susan Nickson	29 April 2002
Janet finds an old love letter from her ex-boyfriend Andy. Janet invites local dwarf Colin to the house to pose as Andy, so that Jonny will not be jealous. Flo plans to become a masseuse at home and asks Donna to move out. Louise realises that she does not fancy James, so she dumps him. She experiments with lesbianism by kissing Janet and Donna.
10	4	"Vomit"	Gareth Carrivick	Susan Nickson	6 May 2002
Janet meets Andy in the pub; Gaz sees Janet and Andy kiss outside the Archer. Gaz confronts Andy, who punches Gaz in the face. Jonny falls ill. Louise reveals Janet's infidelity to Jonny whilst talking to her. Louise buys a dog whom she names Chesney, which is later run over by a lorry. Gaz asks Donna to move in with him.
11	5	"Crusty Curtains"	Gareth Carrivick	Susan Nickson	6 May 2002
Jonny and Janet argue over Janet's kiss with Andy. Gaz and Donna argue over Donna being too demanding in their new living arrangements. Donna ends up spending the night at Janet and Jonny's house while Janet stays at Gaz's flat.
12	6	"Mo Mo and Pigsy"	Gareth Carrivick	Susan Nickson	20 May 2002
Jonny wakes up confused after his sickness and finds Donna, not Janet, bringing him his cup of tea. Louise attempts to predict the future with astrology. Jonny and Donna go to Andy's to search for Janet. The couples reunite in the pub and Jonny proposes to Janet, using the ring he stole from Andy's house.

=== Series 3 (2003) ===
No. overall	No. in series	Title	Directed by	Written by	Original release date
13	1	"Munch"	Gareth Carrivick	Susan Nickson	23 February 2003
Janet accepts Jonny's proposal but insists that he buys her a ring, so he tries to find a job. Gaz discovers he has a half-brother, Munch. Louise goes on a date with Andy to an expensive restaurant, but Andy walks out, leaving Louise to pay the bill.
14	2	"Fish"	Gareth Carrivick	Susan Nickson	2 March 2003
Louise receives a valentine and goes to meet the sender. He turns out to be David, who used to go to school with her but has been living in Australia for the past 8 years. Jonny gets Janet to quit smoking. Gaz and Donna learn new things about each other's living habits.
15	3	"Kangaroo"	Gareth Carrivick	Susan Nickson	9 March 2003
Jonny asks Janet's father, Pete, for her hand in marriage. Donna plans a kinky night in with Gaz. Louise tries to be more mature to prolong her relationship with David.
16	4	"Beastiality"	Gareth Carrivick	Susan Nickson	16 March 2003
Pete has refused Jonny's request to marry Janet. They decide to marry on a small budget. Janet buys a secondhand wedding dress, but its previous owner was several sizes larger than Janet. Munch takes a shine to Donna, which annoys Gaz. Louise discovers that David has a colourful past, including sleeping with Donna. Louise insults Donna, who smacks her. The registry office calls Janet to announce a cancellation for the next day and they can have the slot for themselves.
17	5	"Hospikal"	Gareth Carrivick	Susan Nickson	23 March 2003
Jonny blackmails Pete into paying for the wedding after discovering him with Donna's mother. When Janet suspects a blackmail situation, Jonny says he saw her dad dressed in women's clothing. Trying to avoid Munch lands Gaz in hospital.
18	6	"Dresses, Dresses, Dresses"	Gareth Carrivick	Susan Nickson	30 March 2003
Janet, Donna and Louise shop for wedding dresses with money from Janet's father. Gaz and Jonny steal a barrel from outside the pub and struggle to open it in Gaz's workshop; when it finally opens, it only contains barrel wash. This episode is set on 27 September, Meat Loaf's birthday, as it is stated during the episode.
19	7	"Mokky Bokka"	Gareth Carrivick	Susan Nickson	6 April 2003
Noisy neighbours rob Gaz and Donna of sleep. Jonny's new supervisor harasses him at work, but Janet does not believe him when he tells her, so he gets into more trouble trying to prove it. Louise becomes scared of ageing and David tries to comfort her by showing her that everyone gets old.
20	8	"Jammy Dodgers"	Gareth Carrivick	Susan Nickson	13 April 2003
Jonny and Janet worry that they do not care about each other's opinions when they realise they rarely argue. Louise has sex troubles with David. When Gaz insists that Donna has more nights out, she spends most of the night outside their flat to make him think she is out with her mates.
21	9	"Dump"	Gareth Carrivick	Susan Nickson	20 April 2003
Janet makes a wedding-gift wish list and Jonny helps Donna search for the items at the dump. Gaz teaches Munch about women. Louise meets David's deaf cousin and visits Munch's house with his Social Services supervisor.
22	10	"Schluballybub"	Gareth Carrivick	Susan Nickson	27 April 2003
Feeling she does not love him anymore, Janet leaves Jonny. David buys Louise a plant as a test of trust, which upsets her. Gaz blames Donna for a new wart. Donna and David begin to talk after arguing with their respective partners, which angers Gaz.

=== Musical Special (2003) ===
No. overall	No. in series	Title	Directed by	Written by	Original release date
23	1	"When Janet Met Jonny"	Gareth Carrivick	Susan Nickson	21 December 2003
As Janet leaves Jonny, a musical flashback shows how they met and how Donna rejects Gaz's initial advances. Janet, Donna and Louise go out on the pull and Jonny goes to see Gaz. Jonny and Janet do not know each other and meet in the club. Gaz tries to impress Donna by asking for a blowjob. This special is set in 1998, three years before the start of the first series and contains pastiches of several then current music videos. Stated in the episode that it is set in 1998, yet one of the videos spoofed is "Breathe", which was released in 2003. Janet dresses as Blu Cantrell and Jonny as Sean Paul. Absent: Lee Oakes as Munch

=== Series 4 (2004) ===
No. overall	No. in series	Title	Directed by	Written by	Original release date
24	1	"Corinthian Dies"	Gareth Carrivick	Susan Nickson	15 February 2004
Janet decides to leave Jonny but leaves him a note instead of telling him. Gaz is upset with Donna when he finds out that she was with David a few years ago. Janet stays with Louise, who thinks that David revolves around her. David and Gaz have a drinking competition; David wins. Louise gets back with David, then dumps him because he dumped her. First appearance: Alison Mac as Kate Absent: Lee Oakes as Munch
25	2	"Piggy Goes Oink"	Gareth Carrivick	Susan Nickson	22 February 2004
Louise receives a letter saying that she cannot graduate from university until she returns a children's book titled 'Piggy Goes Oink'. Louise first blames David for taking it because she dumped him. Janet and Jonny are no longer in a relationship and Janet's father kicks Jonny out of the house. Jonny goes to stay at his father's. Janet realised that she made a terrible mistake so she goes to find Jonny and try to make things better. She finds Jonny kissing barmaid Kate outside of The Archer. Donna wants to better herself so she goes to David and he agreed to help her through university, but Gaz is not happy about it. Final appearance: Jonathon Dutton as David
26	3	"My Delicious Guava"	Gareth Carrivick	Karen Laws	29 February 2004
After seeing Jonny with Kate, Louise begins to miss him. Jonny and Kate decide to meet up at the castle for their first date, but when Jonny tries to prove his exceptional masculinity by climbing a wall, he falls and injures his ankle. Louise moves in with Janet to compensate for the loss of Jonny's company. Janet finds a spider and phones Jonny to come catch it. Jonny is also scared of spiders but goes to Janet's to prove his masculinity to Kate - only to faint at the sight of the spider. Gaz feels rejected while Donna is working on her first assignment as a student.
27	4	"Cuggles"	Gareth Carrivick	Susan Nickson	7 March 2004
Louise looks for a hobby, thinking she will get bored after she graduates. Donna suggests that she get a job, but Louise keeps making excuses because she is "sooo lazy". Janet is getting intimate with candy bars because she misses Jonny, so she phones a dateline to see if she can get a new boyfriend. She meets up with a candidate in the Archer...who turns out to be a very masculine she. Louise applies for a job as head of finance at ICI but during the interview the Interviewer realises that her CV is a lie; when she says she has a sociology degree, he offers her a job at Pizza Hut. Gaz goes back to Janet's and they have sex.
28	5	"Purgatory"	Gareth Carrivick	Susan Nickson	14 March 2004
Janet throws a party and leaves the guest list to new housemate Louise, who invites Jonny and Kate, saying she likes Kate and Jonny is much nicer now that he is with her. Janet confesses her love to Jonny, and Kate has sex with Jonny in Janet's bed. Gaz feels guilty about sleeping with Janet and Donna feels guilty about rejecting him, so the couple try to do something special.
29	6	"Mate Date"	Gareth Carrivick	Susan Nickson	21 March 2004
Janet goes to work at the bakery unaware that Louise will be her boss, until they're at the entrance on her first day; Janet is shocked. Kate realises that everyone hates her except Jonny. Donna wants Gaz to break Kate and Jonny up so that Janet and Jonny can get back together. Angry at everyone, Kate wants to leave Runcorn with Jonny, First appearance: Hayley Bishop as Kelly Final appearance: Alison Mac as Kate
30	7	"Homeless and Horny"	Gareth Carrivick	Susan Nickson	28 March 2004
Jonny's father kicks him out after his breakup with Kate, and Janet tries to lure him back home. Louise is sacked from the bakery after becoming power-mad and sacking everyone. Donna's new tutor, Philip, propositions her, promising her better grades if they get together. Gaz becomes impotent. Janet's cheese-and-onion-pasty outfit aids their reconciliation.
31	8	"Filthy Brunching"	Gareth Carrivick	Susan Nickson	4 April 2004
Janet and Jonny have reunited and she tries to excite him more than Kate did. Donna has brunch with her tutor Philip, making Gaz very jealous; his confrontation of Philip cures his impotence! Louise gets a job at the Office for National Statistics where she accidentally wipes Jonny's records. She returns the same evening to recreate them, but also adds in a fanciful criminal record. The police track down Jonny, and the series ends in a hail of bullets in the grounds of Halton Castle high above Runcorn. Absent: Hayley Bishop as Kelly

=== Series 5 (2005) ===
No. overall	No. in series	Title	Directed by	Written by	Original release date
32	1	"Dead"	Gareth Carrivick	Susan Nickson	4 January 2005
Donna feels horny on the day of her mother Flo's funeral. Gaz has erection troubles so Donna buys a cardboard cutout of the Chuckle Brothers to fulfill her sexual needs. After surviving the police shooting at the end of the last series, Jonny is desperate to make the most of being a local celebrity. Louise is arrested for being responsible for Jonny's shooting. When Janet comes to bail her out, Louise confesses that she was responsible for Jonny's shooting, Janet withdraws her bail, and Louise ends up back in prison. Donna cures Gaz of his erection troubles. Jonny's press conference was to be outside of The Archer, but because Janet and Jonny couldn't see it, they decided to go home. News reporter Gordon Burns guest-stars.
33	2	"Nobbly Bobbly"	Gareth Carrivick	Susan Nickson	11 January 2005
Jonny develops agoraphobia after his shooting. Donna inherits her mother's house-on condition that she must not open the cupboard under the stairs. But Gaz hears noises coming from under the stairs and develops paranoia that Flo's spirit is haunting the house. They open the door and the staircase collapses, so they return to their flat. Louise goes into therapy and decides that she must tell Jonny about Gaz and Janet sleeping together.
34	3	"Shrink"	Gareth Carrivick	Susan Nickson	18 January 2005
While Jonny and Janet are planning their second wedding attempt, Janet discovers that she is pregnant. Louise becomes a counsellor and talks about how Donna's mother died. Gaz kisses Louise so that he and Janet can blackmail her into not telling Jonny that they slept together. Donna checks her bank balance and discovers that the money from selling her mother's house has arrived. She decides to use it to go hiking in Ecuador with Gaz, but he accidentally tells her about him and Janet sleeping together.
35	4	"Ecuador"	Gareth Carrivick	Susan Nickson	25 January 2005
Jonny buys a car and gets driving lessons from Gaz. Louise tries to force Jonny into publicly forgiving her for the shooting by threatening him with the destruction of his car. Jonny gives her new dress to a charity shop, so she gets his car crushed. Donna leaves Gaz and tries to go to Ecuador on her own, but Gaz takes her passport. Janet tries to persuade Donna not to go, but she is determined. As a gesture of goodwill, Janet returns Donna's passport to her, which makes Donna think that Janet wants her to go, so she decides to stay.
36	5	"Potato People"	Gareth Carrivick	Susan Nickson	1 February 2005
Janet tries to make up with Donna who is apparently moving on with her life and does not care. Donna goes to the Archer to make new friends and tells Kelly that Gaz is now single. Kelly dresses and acts like Donna to impress Gaz. Jonny gets Louise to help him with his "job" of selling alcohol to teenagers after he is banned from the off-licence. Absent: Lee Oakes as Munch
37	6	"Antlers"	Gareth Carrivick	Susan Nickson	8 February 2005
Jonny's stag night does not go to Gaz's plan as he doesn't want anyone there who knows that he slept with Janet. Louise makes the most of her possible last night of freedom at Janet's hen night; her trial for shooting Jonny is the next day. Donna and Janet make up and Donna gives Janet a music-box which symbolises their everlasting friendship.
38	7	"Crab"	Gareth Carrivick	Susan Nickson	15 February 2005
Jonny and Janet wake up in an Iceland truck on their wedding day. Gaz and Donna try to find them and try to ensure that Janet and Jonny's names get on a marriage certificate. As they cannot find them, Gaz and Donna pose as Jonny and Janet for the wedding ceremony. Meanwhile Louise's trial seems to go well, but as she will not admit that she did something stupid, she is ordered to do community service. Absent: Lee Oakes as Munch
39	8	"Fat"	Gareth Carrivick	Susan Nickson	22 February 2005
6 months after the wedding, Gaz has gained serious weight and needs to lose it quickly. Janet develops a nesting instinct after a shock that her baby may be taken away from her because of her dirty house. Donna has a promotion at the bucket factory but must sell 4000 buckets or she will get fired. Louise is doing her community service with 'five little chavettes' and Jonny gets a job in The Archer but nothing goes quite right. Final appearance: Lee Oakes as Munch (until Series 7, Episode 3)
40	9	"Stot Or Pronk"	Gareth Carrivick	Susan Nickson	1 March 2005
Donna wants to get surgery after she becomes envious of Gaz getting back into shape. Louise prepares a heavily-pregnant Janet to enter the pub quiz. Feeling anxious about the baby, Jonny persuades Gaz to help Janet with the antenatal classes.
41	10	"Who's The Daddy?"	Gareth Carrivick	Susan Nickson	8 March 2005
Donna and Gaz try to make each other jealous by talking about imaginary new partners. Donna ends up upsetting Gaz when she says he was crap in bed. Storming out, Gaz gets run over by the ambulance that's coming for Janet. Donna realizes how much she loves Gaz, and they make up--on his hospital bed. Meanwhile, worried that she will never get a job because of her criminal record, Louise decides to become a diehard charity-collector, but her goodwill does not last long; besides, she does not appreciate the chance to do a good deed. Concussed after his accident, Gaz lets slip to Jonny that he is the father of Janet's baby. Devastated, Jonny rushes to confront Janet, but Donna intercepts him; telling him Janet has had the baby, she persuades him to forgive her. Jonny proudly announces the birth of Corinthian McVitie Keogh--after his favourite biscuits.
42	11	"Bababababa"	Gareth Carrivick	Susan Nickson	15 March 2005
Janet becomes a baby bore and Jonny tries to regain her attention. Now that Gaz is back with Donna and Janet has a baby, Louise feels ignored and tries to get one of Kelly's men for herself. Donna strongly resists babysitting Corinthian with Gaz.
43	12	"God"	Gareth Carrivick	Susan Nickson	22 March 2005
Louise becomes religious. Jonny tries to make Corinthian more exciting; Janet suggests getting him christened and making Donna and Gaz godparents. Gaz takes Donna's mother's HRT tablets to try to become more sensitive.
44	13	"Love 83199"	Gareth Carrivick	Susan Nickson	29 March 2005
Gaz's flat is falling apart, so Donna wants them to move into a house. Janet is suffering from post-natal depression; Jonny looks for work and finds his dream job working in a "Jammie Dodgers" biscuit factory. Gaz and Donna go to view a house but Gaz nixes it after he sees a sheep (because of his phobia). Louise starts a relationship with her phone.
45	14	"Near, Far"	Gareth Carrivick	Susan Nickson	5 April 2005
Janet is offered a job singing on a cruise ship. Louise is in a relationship with Mick, "stylist to the stars--of Hollyoaks". Jonny has his interview for the biscuit-factory job. Gaz stands up to the sheep and he and Donna are going to move into the house. Just as everyone seems ready to move on, all of their futures fall apart except Janet's.

=== Series 6 (2006) ===
No. overall	No. in series	Title	Directed by	Written by	Original release date	Viewers (millions)
46	1	"Speedycruise!"	Becky Martin	Susan Nickson	26 February 2006	723,000
Jonny does not want Janet to leave her family behind to work on the cruise ship. Jonny says that they could all go together but as Corinthian doesn't have a passport he and Jonny can't get on the boat. When Janet finds out what she is expected to wear, she immediately leaves. Unemployed after his father sells the garage, Gaz tries to convince Donna to buy it with the money from selling her mother's house, but she wants to buy a mobile library (wanting to call it the 'Donnabile-library'). As Louise's mother is taken into hospital with kidney failure, she tells Louise that she is adopted.
47	2	"Goblins"	Becky Martin	Susan Nickson	5 March 2006	649,000
Janet makes money by making toy goblins. Jonny campaigns for baby-changing facilities in the pub. Donna is convinced that her sexist employers are preventing her from getting promoted because she is a woman and she is sacked after she tries to prove that she can drive a van. Louise receives a letter from her biological parents, but cannot physically open it. Gaz fires himself for laziness (and other), then rehires himself with a pay rise the same day, after Donna crashes the van.
48	3	"Mummy Cupboard"	Becky Martin	Susan Nickson	12 March 2006	573,000
Janet pawns her wedding ring and tries to make money by working on a sex chatline. Jonny decides that Corinthian should not be exposed to his bad influences. Louise meets her father. Gaz wants to propose to Donna, but she is masquerading as "Don" so they can get more work done at the garage together instead of having sex all the time.
49	4	"Cauliflower"	Nick Wood	Susan Nickson	19 March 2006	689,000
Gaz refuses to accept Donna's refusal to his wedding proposal. Louise meets her father: Brian, a gay alcoholic who begins to fancy Jonny. Janet starts shoplifting after she accidentally steals some clothes from a shop. When Donna finally accepts Gaz's proposal, he tries to give her a dream wedding.
50	5	"Drunk"	Nick Wood	Susan Nickson	26 March 2006	759,000
Jonny is angry with Brian for thinking he is homosexual so he decides to become more macho, telling Janet that he wants to go back to "when men were men and women were shorter". His plan backfires and Janet angers him by calling him a "big gay", so he threatens to hit her. Gaz is upset because Donna will not marry him. Louise gets drunk on one glass of wine so she thinks that she is an alcoholic and joins Alcoholics Anonymous. Gaz wants to get Donna pregnant and tries to reclaim Corinthian.
51	6	"Croppity Crops"	Nick Wood and Becky Martin	Susan Nickson	2 April 2006	604,000
Jonny decides to become a farmer. After her alcoholism, Louise decides that she needs a family and tries to join Janet and Jonny's. Janet lives in fear after Gaz's attempt to take Corinthian. Donna introduces Gaz to tantric sex, but after they fail, Gaz starts to donate to a sperm bank.
52	7	"Finger Sniffing"	Becky Martin	Susan Nickson	9 April 2006	580,000
Janet and Donna compete for a pub-manager job. Louise buys a car with her mother's legacy - prior to her actual death. Jonny realises that Gaz is Corinthian's father and hands him over, until Gaz reveals that Corinthian cannot be his due to his low sperm count.
53	8	"War, Hurrgh!"	Becky Martin	Susan Nickson	16 April 2006	550,000
After getting the manager's job, Janet turns the pub into a World War II theme pub. To get back at Janet, Donna poses as a health inspector to try to close it. Louise becomes a prostitute to pay off her debt after her mother lives. Jonny buys Gaz a puppy to nurture, to help him with his desire to have children. After he accidentally kills the puppy, Gaz tries to adopt. Gaz tells Janet that Donna is not a health inspector, so she deliberately makes the pub dirty--just as a real health inspector arrives.
54	9	"Closing Time"	Nick Wood	Susan Nickson	23 April 2006	641,000
When the brewery closes the pub due to health concerns, Kelly and Janet hold a siege, planning to occupy the Archer so it can't be closed down. Louise learns she is pregnant and tries to determine the father, only remembering the way he grasped her breasts. Gaz speaks to Donna's dad on the phone and agrees to look after Donna's 16-year-old brother, Dion. Jonny kisses Arthur to make sure he is not turning homosexual.
55	10	"When Janet Killed Jonny"	Nick Wood	Susan Nickson	30 April 2006	661,000
The group break into The Archer, despite a curse which states that everyone who enters will be killed by the thing they love the most. Kelly is suffocated by crisp packets, Louise saws her own head off after sawing into her own leg and bashing herself in the head with a hammer, Donna gets chopped in two trying to break through the glass ceiling, Gaz is crushed by Donna's legs and Jonny is consumed by a giant Jammie Dodger. Janet is not seen being killed, but as she tries to escape, she is pulled back into the building by the rest of her friends. Janet then wakes up finding it all to have been a dream. However, she turns her head away from Jonny and when she turns back to look his head is a giant Jammie Dodger.... Notes: Last appearance of Jonny Keogh (Ralf Little), although mentioned later in the series; Last appearance of Kelly Crabtree (Hayley Bishop); This episode is considered a fantasy outside of the series' narrative, as all characters (minus Jonny Keogh and Kelly Crabtree) reappear in the next series, with no mention of these events.; This is the first and only episode in the entire series not to have a studio audience.

=== Series 7 (2008) ===
No. overall	No. in series	Title	Directed by	Written by	Original release date	Viewers (millions)
56	1	"When Jonny Met Sharky"	Nick Wood	Susan Nickson	13 January 2008	897,000
Synopsis: While Jonny is in Hawaii, having won a competition to go shark-jumping, Donna and Janet decide they need jobs and end up competing for the position of barmaid at the reopened Archer. The new manager, Tim, has changed it into a theme pub, and although the theme is John Barrowman, it initially looks exactly the same. Louise decides that her squeaky voice does not help her and resolves to do something about it. Gaz, wanting to do something exciting, tries several stunts. The episode ends with Janet receiving a devastating phone call from Hawaii: Jonny is dead, having been eaten by a shark. Production: The episode was broadcast live and opened with a shot of the studio control room before showing the studio itself; only three sets were used - Gaz & Donna's flat, The Archer, and Janet and Jonny's living room, although some exterior shots were used as links. At the end, the cast took their bows to the studio audience. Notes: First appearance of Luke Gell as Tim; When Gaz asks why anyone would want to water-ski over a shark, Janet replies with The Fonz's catchphrase "Aaay!", underlining the reference to Happy Days.; There are references in the narrative to the fact that the episode is being broadcast live; Tim refers to the programme which actually followed the initial broadcast, Marc Wootton Exposed, and Janet comments on what she has just seen on BBC Three.; Gaz is seen emulating Evel Knievel, recreating Malcolm Hardee's "balloon dance", and attempting fire eating.; In the karaoke scene, Donna sings "Chick Chick Chicken", which was a UK hit record for Natalie Casey when she was three years old; Donna says that she is going to "release [it] as a 12-inch drum and bass remix".; Reception: 897,000 viewers watched the live broadcast and a further 291,000 the later repeat, giving the show its highest ever rating.
57	2	"DABDAA!"	Nick Wood	Susan Nickson	20 January 2008	769,000
It is Jonny's funeral and Janet is having difficulty coming to terms with his death. She resolves to follow the Five Stages of Grief: Denial, Anger, Bargaining, Depression and Acceptance as quickly as possible however Gaz tells her she is moving quicker than "Darren Day on a stage full of blondes". Meanwhile, Louise announces her pregnancy and Donna has started working at The Archer. Gaz tries to comfort Janet but Donna remains suspicious of his motives in doing so.
58	3	"Homophobia Is Gay"	Nick Wood	Tim Dawson	27 January 2008	738,000
Janet is broke and reduced to wrapping herself in turf to keep warm. Donna tries to help Tim admit his homosexuality even though he claims to be happily married to a rugby-playing wife; this backfires and Tim fires her. Meanwhile, Gaz misses male company following Jonny's death. Louise conducts a fake séance to persuade Janet that she should move in. Munch reappears and appears to have found God.
59	4	"Dead Jonny Walking"	Nick Wood	Susan Nickson	10 February 2008	512,000
Donna, now running The Archer, is too busy to arrange her wedding to Gaz, which is a week away. Jonny's memorial stone arrives but Janet does not want to look at it, although she tries to keep Corinthian aware of him. Louise is not happy to learn that she's carrying a baby girl--"She might be prettier than me!" After a glass of Vimto, Munch's religious enthusiasm fades, and he is hurt when Gaz wishes he were "less stupid." Louise panics when her baby's heartbeat cannot be heard, but when it turns out the nurse is drunk and the baby was lying on her side, Louise realises that she will love her daughter. Meanwhile, Munch can read--just not music.
60	5	"Here Bums The Bride"	Nick Wood	Kate Wincup	17 February 2008	807,000
Donna and Gaz have their wedding but since Janet has organised it, the decorations are completely Jonny-centric. Louise advises Janet to throw out some of Jonny's things in order to get over her loss. Janet shows a box of Jonny's old love letters to Louise, who finds a letter from the hospital addressed to Jonny. Janet takes most of Jonny's possessions to the charity shop where she reveals to Donna that she actually is not coping well with her loss. Louise decides to keep the letter a secret as it reveals that Jonny had had a DNA test which showed that he is not Corinthian's father; however, she shows it to Gaz. Meanwhile, Janet becomes interested in Munch.
61	6	"Six Months Later"	Nick Wood	Jon Brown	24 February 2008	830,000
Louise is now 9 months pregnant but does not think the baby shows. Finding a pile of neglected post, she discovers that the rent hasn't been paid and Janet is about to be evicted. Meanwhile, fed up with The Archer, Donna wants to move into management and is eagerly awaiting the interview-requesting phone call. To help Janet, Louise finds Aidan, who has just robbed a post office and is rich. Gaz wants to buy Janet's house, but Donna prefers a more upmarket property. In the end she relents--but her hopes of promotion are dashed.
62	7	"African Death Face"	Nick Wood	Jon Brown	2 March 2008	640,000
Donna and Gaz are now living in Janet's house. Donna's job interview does not go well because she does not understand management speak. Left alone, Janet and Gaz rekindle old desires. When Louise goes into labour, she ends up being her own birthing-partner in Donna's absence. Janet realizes she and Gaz should stay together, but Donna returns from a successful interview and tells Gaz they are moving to London.
63	8	"Borry"	Nick Wood	Susan Nickson	9 March 2008	728,000
Gaz has fallen in love with Janet and does not want to move south with Donna. Donna has met a man named Wesley in London and wants to move on from Gaz, but when Gaz lets slip that he and Janet are in love, Donna gut-reaction throws beer over them, but eventually realizes that they belong together because they are "scum"--in a nice way. Meanwhile, aided by Munch, Louise gives birth (in the Archer) to a beautiful girl she names "Louise Louise Brooks" (she tells Munch the name is "Louise Munch Brooks"). Gaz and Donna part on ostensibly good terms, and the episode closes with flashbacks of moments throughout the series, to the background of Avril Lavigne's "When You're Gone".

=== Comic Relief Special (2009) ===
No. overall	No. in series	Title	Directed by	Written by	Original release date	Viewers (millions)
64	Special	"When Janet Met Michelle"	Nick Wood	Susan Nickson and Tim Dawson	8 March 2009	688,000
Synopsis: The various characters decide to gather at The Archer for Timothy Claypole's Comic Relief fun night of fun fundraiser; Tim calls everyone he knows and claims he is "more popular than Birkenstocks at a lesbian wake." Donna is seen in a green screen Piccadilly Circus, agreeing to return to Runcorn for Timothy Claypole's night of fun. Tim's contest consists of three events: a "bitch-off"; a "drink-off"; and a "flirt-off." Notes: This was a curtain raiser for the new series and a one-off special for Comic Relief, bringing together "Two Pints.." and two other BBC Three comedies: Coming of Age and Grownups. The episode's title refers to two roles both played by Sheridan Smith, Janet from "Two Pints" and Michelle from "Grownups".; The title sequence was re-edited to include newer material and to superimpose the Comic Relief Red Nose.; Joe Pasquale appears in a cameo role (Joe Pasquale is DK from Coming of Age's father), as does a cardboard cut-out of Jeremy Clarkson frequently used in Coming of Age.; In Janet and Michelle's initial appearance together, split screen techniques are used, but after this, a body double (Rachel Marwood) is used.; Michelle briefly sings "My Heart Will Go On" in reference to Janet's rendition in the episodes "Near, Far." and "When Jonny Met Sharky"; Will Mellor has said that the language was toned down to suit a younger audience.; The Song "Stop Thinking, Start Drinking reappeared during the show along with a short of the song "I've Got My Lovely Crunchy Biscuits"

=== Series 8 (2009) ===
No. overall	No. in series	Title	Directed by	Written by	Original release date	Viewers (millions)
65	1	"Candle"	Nick Wood	Susan Nickson	15 March 2009	523,000
On Gaz and Janet's first night in as a couple, they cannot decide whether to stay in or go out. Gaz has booked a babysitter for Corinthian but Janet is shocked to discover that it is his ex, "Bald Shirley". Meanwhile, memories of Jonny are hard to put aside, but Janet wants Gaz to get a Court order of parental responsibility for Corinthian. The title refers to the candle made from Jonny's earwax that Janet has kept as a memento. Notes: Absent: Natalie Casey as Donna, Kathryn Drysdale as Louise; This is the first two-hander of the show
66	2	"Gazman"	Nick Wood	Kate Wincup	22 March 2009	N/A
Gaz decides he will be "the best dad ever" to Corinthian. He dresses in flat cap, thick-rimmed glasses and comfortable sweater, and tries his parenting skills out on Tim. Meanwhile Louise is having some difficulty with her baby and seeks help from Janet. Donna returns from London for a visit and wants to move back, possibly with Wesley. Gaz goes to court to seek an order for parental responsibility, but arrives back home thinking his application has been rejected. He and Janet confront the judge, who says she will approve him. Wesley arrives, but is patronising towards the group and insulting to Runcorn. Donna decides to move back home.
67	3	"Flan Van"	Nick Wood	Jon Brown	29 March 2009	N/A
Janet is mugged by a youth. To prove she is tough enough to look after herself, she applies for a job as a Police Community Support Officer (PCSO). Wesley tries to persuade Donna to move back to London; Gaz advises him that he can win Donna over by being more explicit in public. Meanwhile Louise is looking for a father for Louise Louise so she does not have to do all the work. Donna has decided to move back to London with Wesley but when she tells him this, she is annoyed by his new mannerisms. Janet messes up her interview but rescues the situation by explaining the mugging. Wesley tells Donna he will stay in Runcorn, but only if she divorces Gaz. She agrees and tells Gaz that she wants a quickie divorce.
68	4	"Ello Ello"	Nick Wood	Tim Dawson	5 April 2009	N/A
Janet starts her job as a PCSO, but finds it hard to establish her authority. Gaz offers her a taser, but she is not keen on using it. Louise is still coming to terms with being a mother. Wesley seeks Gaz's advice about the culture of Runcorn. Donna and Gaz get their divorce papers through, but such a break makes them both reconsider; reminiscing, they wonder if they have made the right decision. Meanwhile Wesley lets slip to Louise that he already has a child. Janet decides that she needs to arrest somebody to gain self-confidence in her job, and it turns out to be Wesley, who has taken Gaz's advice all too completely. Unfortunately, she tasers him, and is arrested herself.
69	5	"D.I.V.O.R.C.E."	Nick Wood	Susan Nickson	19 April 2009	N/A
Donna and Gaz are at their solicitors' office, ready to finalise their divorce. Both are seemingly ready to be apart, but cannot manage to actually sign the papers. Through a series of fantasies and flashbacks, they see themselves as children and wonder what life might be like if they had never met, if Donna were rich and successful, and just how fat Gaz may have become.
70	6	"Val Doonican"	Nick Wood	Tim Dawson	26 April 2009	N/A
Wesley gives Gaz an engagement ring (apparently a family heirloom) which he plans to use in a surprise proposal to Janet, but is struggling to think of just the right way to propose. Donna offers to help Gaz prepare for the wedding, despite Tim's warnings that she will end up hurt, and Gaz and Donna spend the day together. Meanwhile, Janet gets a job on Wesley's market stall, but comes home with stomach pains and ends up in hospital being rushed into surgery. As this happens, Gaz is at Donna's apologising for an earlier argument, which results in the two sleeping together.: Absent: Kathryn Drysdale as Louise
71	7	"You Decide"	Nick Wood	Kate Wincup	3 May 2009	580,000
Janet returns home to find Gaz absent. When he returns, she tells him when she went to surgery, she held hands with Wesley all night. Gaz lets slip that he slept with Donna the previous night, and Janet throws him out. Gaz decides he wants Janet, but at Donna's he decides he loves her too. Meanwhile, Louise meets Scott, a former member of the boy band "R-Soul", whose surname turns out to be Chegg. Wesley and Janet go to Gaz's flat to sort things out, only to find him and Donna in bed having obviously just had sex. Both women put him on the spot, insisting that he choose between them. Notes: The episode was originally listed as "R Soul". On its first airdate, the episode was followed by "The Love Triangle", a documentary narrated by Fearne Cotton, to set up the viewers' poll to decide who should be Gaz's choice; the cast and Susan Nickson reviewed the characters and their various relationships over the preceding eight series.
72	8	"Keep On Running"	Nick Wood	Susan Nickson	10 May 2009	690,000
Janet and Donna give Gaz until 3pm to make his choice. Louise tells Wesley that Gaz is Corinthian's biological father; Wesley proceeds to threaten Gaz before realising the truth will only hurt everyone. Tim helps Janet and Donna to realise that Gaz does not deserve either of them, and Janet kicks Gaz out of the house. Gaz tells Janet that Corinthian is his son, but she misunderstands his true meaning. Meanwhile, Louise worries that Scott will abandon her for a groupie while on tour. She decides to send him a picture message, but cannot decide which pose to use until Gaz sends an explicit photo for her, which he calls the "standing muff shot" and says that everyone loves it. Initially terrified of Scott's response, she is thrilled when he replies with a message which says "I Think I Love You". Having alienated all of his friends, Gaz finally realises who he wants to be with. He races to find her, even taking a car to make it in time, but a crash leads to the car exploding. A week later, he wakes up to find Donna at his bedside. She has been doting on him the whole time he has been unconscious, and promises that they can work through their difficulties and be happy together. Gaz agrees, saying "It's Always Been You, Donna".: This is the last episode to feature Kathryn Drysdale as Louise; Alternative ending: The final scene of this episode was determined by an online poll, where viewers decided that Gaz should choose Donna over Janet. The other filmed ending was made available to watch online and is also available on Disc two of the Series 8 DVD. When Gaz wakes up, Janet is by his side and tells him that while she knows they would both choose Corinthian over each other, that is good enough for her. Gaz says "I want to be with you, Janet, you."

=== The Aftermath (2009) ===
No. overall	No. in series	Title	Directed by	Written by	Original release date	Viewers (millions)
73	1	"Waiting For Gaz"	Geoff Posner	Susan Nickson	15 December 2009	720,000
Janet waits in the Archer with Tim and Wesley for Gaz to return, hoping he has chosen her. They learn that Gaz is in hospital after a car accident; Janet is heartbroken when Tim reports that Gaz is not wishing for her and that Donna's with him.: The episode and its follow-up were shown as a Christmas special; the plot is interspersed with musical items performed by Janet, Tim, and Wesley.; This was the only episode not to feature Will Mellor, and the second that did not feature Natalie Casey.; This was the series' second musical episode.; This is the last episode to feature Sheridan Smith as Janet and Thomas Nelstrop as Wesley.
74	2	"Sliding Gaz"	Geoff Posner	Susan Nickson	22 December 2009	720,000
Donna visits Gaz in hospital after his car crash and prays to God for her boyfriend, and in a "sliding doors" technique is shown imagining life with Gaz alternately healthy and paralysed.: The episode was a two-hander featuring only Will Mellor and Natalie Casey; it was the show's second two-hander.; This is the last episode to be written by Susan Nickson.

=== Series 9 (2011) ===
It was announced by the BBC in 2011 that a ninth series of Two Pints would be filmed in 2011 and shown later in the year with two new characters called Cassie and Billy. A plot summary of the new "refreshed" series was issued by the BBC. This was the final ever series due to BBC Three axeing the show in July.

No. overall	No. in series	Title	Directed by	Written by	Original release date
75	1	"Nil By Muff"	Nick Wood	Robin Taylor and David Cantor	26 April 2011
Gaz struggles to adjust to being in a wheelchair after returning home, and is confused by the behaviour of aspiring footballer Billy, who helped to care for him in hospital. Meanwhile, Tim's life is thrown into turmoil when his younger sister Cassie turns up on his doorstep. *First appearance of Freddie Hogan as Billy McCormack and Georgia Henshaw as Cassie Claypole.
76	2	"Cheese Toastie"	Nick Wood	Robin Taylor and David Cantor	26 April 2011
Billy's metrosexual behaviour continues to baffle Gaz, who finally cracks and throws him out. Donna faces up to the responsibility of being a breadwinner and visits the job centre, but seeing her old school rival leaves her feeling inadequate. Meanwhile, Tim tries to give Cassie a makeover.
77	3	"Trial Schmile"	Nick Wood	Robin Taylor and David Cantor	3 May 2011
Gaz goes to extreme lengths in a bid to secure Billy a trial for Runcorn Rovers. Donna re-examines her life and finds inner peace, but struggles to resist being lured back into the corporate world by a generous offer, while Cassie resolves to discover a dark secret about Tim to blackmail him with. Tim, brave as he is, gains the attention of the pub in an effort to spill his secret before Cassie does. His efforts prove futile and he spills more secrets about himself. He tells the pub that his marriage was a sham and that he was gay.
78	4	"The Gaz-Bot"	Nick Wood	Robin Taylor and David Cantor	10 May 2011
Gaz gets used to being in a wheelchair and decides to become a Paralympian. Donna sees this as an opportunity to prepare for her new HR job and takes over his training, forcing him to compete in a marathon. Meanwhile, Billy agrees to a date with Cassie, and Tim struggles to adapt to his new life after coming out.
79	5	"Shagger"	Nick Wood	Robin Taylor and David Cantor	17 May 2011
Tim enlists the help of a phone app in his search for a boyfriend, but problems arise when he actually meets a potential partner. Billy's relationship with Cassie proves to be a distraction from football training, and Donna tries to find a new best friend she can confide in.
80	6	"This Is Your Life"	Nick Wood	Robin Taylor and David Cantor	24 May 2011
Gaz has a party to mark his 30th birthday, but the celebratory mood ends as he reflects on his lack of achievements over the years. Donna visits the doctor and is left reeling by the news she receives, Tim is stunned when Leonard asks him out on a date, while Cassie's relationship with Billy is threatened by the appearance of her ex-boyfriend.: Final episode of the show; Final appearances: Will Mellor as Gaz, Natalie Casey as Donna, Luke Gell as Tim, Freddie Hogan as Billy McCormack and Georgia Henshaw as Cassie Claypole
