= List of Two Pints of Lager and a Packet of Crisps characters =

Main characters

The following is a list of characters for the British sitcom Two Pints of Lager and a Packet of Crisps written by Susan Nickson and broadcast by the BBC. The first series began on 26 February 2001 with the final series being broadcast in 2011.

== Main characters ==
=== Gaz Wilkinson ===
- Played by: Will Mellor

Gary "Gaz" Wilkinson: Born in 1980, Gaz has two sisters (Julie and Tasha) and a half-brother, Munch. He works as a mechanic at Brindley Autos, originally owned by his father until it was sold to Donna. Gaz is a stereotypical "blokey bloke" who likes football (supporting Manchester City), and also beer, sex, Hollyoaks and Monarch of the Glen. He is an avid collector and user of pornography and has a phobia of sheep. In a late series 5 episode, Gaz and Donna plan to move to a house in Knowsley, but on a visit to check out the house he spots a sheep in the field and is too terrified to want to live there anymore. It is revealed in another episode that Gaz and Donna met as kids in the park and Donna caused his fear of sheep by claiming they eat you in your sleep. In the episode when Donna moves into Gaz's flat, she notices that he has some strange habits, such as only using bread from the middle of the loaf when making toast. His favourite books include The Lust of the Mohicans, Pleasure Island, Macbiff and The Count of Monte Cristo (although the cover doesn't actually say "Count"). He is the person responsible for splitting up Jonny and Kate, much to the happiness of Janet. At one point, he cheats on Donna by sleeping with Janet. This secret is kept quiet for a while, until he accidentally reveals his betrayal to Donna one night in bed. After this, he and Donna split up for a while, until they get back together after he is involved in a road accident. Gaz finds out he has a low sperm count after deciding to become a sperm donor because he feels broody; this supposedly proves that Jonny is Corinthian Keogh's father. He proposes to Donna numerous times throughout Series 6 before the two of them finally get engaged, and they eventually marry in Series 7. After the marriage ceremony, Louise finds out that Gaz is Corinthian's real father and, despite trying to keep it secret, informs him, to his delight; but she decides not to tell Janet, who is still dealing with the loss of Jonny. Gaz and Janet finally realise they belong together, and at the end of series 7, Donna leaves them to be together. In series 8, Donna returns and Gaz is happy with Janet, but cannot resist having sex with Donna for old times' sake; eventually, Janet and Donna give him an ultimatum to choose between them. Gaz decides that he loves Donna after all, and drives to her, crashing a car on the way. He wakes up in hospital, to find Donna at his bedside. This result was chosen by viewers in an online poll. In series 9, Gaz is in a wheelchair following the car accident, after a year-long coma. Throughout the next series Gaz struggles to come to terms with being disabled and tells Donna that he will walk again; with a little help from her he manages to take his first steps. In the final episode, Gaz turns 30 and realising he has never been outside Runcorn he decides to travel the world with Donna. She, however, finding out she may have cancer, tells Gaz she won't be coming with him, but doesn't tell him the reason. Gaz then says an emotional farewell to her at the airport before leaving to start his new life. Janet is currently unaware that Gaz is the father of her son, due to Jonny taking a paternity test before he died, but Gaz has previously tried to tell Janet this, however; realising it may upset her, Gaz decides to keep the paternity of Corinthian from Janet.

=== Donna Henshaw ===
- Played by: Natalie Casey

Donna Louise Henshaw was conceived in a Ford Capri and born in 1981; after a long relationship she marries Gaz Wilkinson. She has a GCSE in Music, and is the brazen, sexually precocious one of the group. She dislikes vegetarian students and people who diet (however, she very much disliked Gaz when he was fat). She is also known to have a vicious temper, and once killed an ex-boyfriend's budgie with bleach (domestos). Donna has a younger sister, Katie, and an estranged younger brother, Dion, who is the father of Louise's baby. Their mother Flo, to whom Donna was very close, dies after being run over by a truck. She is estranged from her father, for unknown reasons. Donna is employed for a time by O'Connor's Plastics selling buckets, rising to a well-paid executive until she is sacked for stealing and crashing a company van. Donna and Gaz briefly split after Donna finds out about Gaz's one night stand with her best friend Janet; she then goes to great lengths to hide the fact she still has feelings for him including considering plastic surgery. They eventually get back together after Gaz is involved in a road accident, when she finally admits that she loves him. She proposes to Gaz at the end of Series 6, after rejecting his earlier proposal to her, and they finally marry in Series 7. Donna works at the Archer after taking over the manager's position from Tim Claypole, but seeking to move onwards, obtains a job in London, leaves Gaz and reveals she has met a man called 'Wesley', with whom she returns in Series 8. At the end of the series, however, Gaz chooses to be with Donna over Janet. The ninth series sees Donna struggling to adapt to her new life without Janet and Louise and looking after Gaz. In the series finale after Gaz realises after celebrating his 30th birthday that he has never left Runcorn he decides to travel the world with Donna but after finding out she may have cancer she tells Gaz she won't be coming with him but doesn't reveal the reason why. Gaz then gives Donna an emotional farewell at the airport before leaving to start his new life.

=== Janet Keogh ===
- Played by: Sheridan Smith (Series 1–8)

Born 25 June 1981 as Janet Smith, Janet Keogh has GCSEs in P.E. and Home Economics and is the homely girl who loves "things that go bleep bleep", Cheeky Vimto, cigarettes, Coronation Street and rich tea biscuits. Janet initially works in Sayers' (Hampson's) Bakery until she beats Donna for the position of manager of The Archer, shortly before it is closed down by health and safety inspectors. Janet and Jonny are together from Series 1 and she has always tried to remain loyal to him. However, she kisses ex-boyfriend Andy outside the Archer during Series 2, only to be caught by Gaz and Louise. When engaged to Jonny, Janet realises that she doesn't love him any more and dumps him. This leads to jealousy when Jonny finds a new girlfriend, Kate. During this time, Janet has a one-night stand with Gaz after both are feeling unloved, but are discovered by Louise; Louise later reveals this during a flashback. Janet manages to persuade Jonny to come back to her, and they marry in Series 5. She later gives birth to a child, "Corinthian McVitie Keogh". In Series 7, Jonny's death affects Janet greatly and her sense of loss results in her attempting to seduce Gaz's half-brother Munch; she also allows Louise to move in with her. Eventually she realises that she loves Gaz, and Donna's departure for London leaves them together. However, at the end of the eighth series, Gaz chooses to be with Donna over Janet. By series 9, after Gaz wakes up from his year long coma, Janet has taken Corinthian and moved away to Milton Keynes. Janet is still unbeknownst that Jonny took a paternity test before he died, which revealed Gaz to be the father of their son, following their fling a few years back.

=== Jonny Keogh ===
- Played by: Ralf Little (Series 1–6)

Born 30 June 1981, Jonny is a devoted husband to Janet Smith. (Note: In the Series Four episode “Filthy Brunching” his birth date is shown as 26 October on the file deleted by Louise.)

Jonny loves daytime television (especially Through the Keyhole, LK Today, This Morning and As Time Goes By), eating cat food, desiccated coconut, carpets (because they are "nice"), egg butties, Bovril, and his six o’clock sandwich. He has a fetish for biscuits - mostly Jammie Dodgers. Jonny's obsession for biscuits is shown in many episodes.

Jonny is a keen fan of Liverpool F.C., has a secret obsession with the film Titanic, Johnny has seen the Titanic film 17 times and also enjoys cartoons such as ThunderCats and Teenage Mutant Ninja Turtles from his childhood. Despite being a husband and father, Jonny frequently struggles to deal with his feminine side (according to Janet his "big cock-munching side"); Jonny nearly punches Janet in the Series 6 episode “Drunk” when she calls him "a big gay" after she began to push him around because she was sick of it.

Sheridan Smith has said that Susan Nickson intended Jonny to become more gay as time passed, but Ralf Little was not keen on this; however he went along with it. Nickson herself claims that she was only exposing Ralf's "latent homosexuality". Jonny is unemployed throughout the series except for brief periods of time and once describes himself to Gaz as a "lazy gobshite", for a time receiving more on Jobseeker's Allowance than Donna earns. He is killed off-screen in the first episode of series 7, “When Jonny met Sharky”. Following his death, Janet has a statue made of his body, and still keeps the head in her home, after it is broken off. It is revealed by Louise that Jonny took a paternity test before he died, following recent events between Janet and Gaz, as Janet became pregnant after having a one-night stand with Gaz, which Jonny found out about when Janet was in labour. The test revealed Gaz, not Jonny, to be the father of Janet's son. Janet does not know this; she still believes that Jonny is her son's father.

=== Louise Brooks ===
- Played by: Kathryn Drysdale (Series 1–8)

Louise Susannah Brooks, born in 1982, is initially seen as a student of sociology, although in one episode she is seen as a trainee social worker. She is desperate to find the perfect man and loves horoscopes, Coronation Street, collecting Sylvanian Families, balloon animals, Steps, and the Disney Store. She dislikes old people and fears getting old. Childish, selfish, naive, and insensitive, she deters most men she meets. Louise has a high-pitched voice which Kelly the barmaid says "chills her to the bones", and Donna has called her a "squeaky little twatbag". Louise discovers that she is adopted; her adoptive mother is a "depressed maniac" who sits in her nightie looking at the fridge all day. Louise eventually meets her birth mother and her husband (whom she initially believes is her real father) then eventually tracks down her birth father Brian, who turns out to be a gay alcoholic conman. She also mentions an "Auntie Nigel", who is supposedly a psychopath. Louise is a snob who respects Jonny so little that she won't even look at him. On one occasion (Series 1, Episode 5) Jonny snogs her then tells her she "tastes like lard”, although at one point she stated that she liked him "in a way". Louise even got "dull" Jonny shot once: When she took a job at the Office for National Statistics, she changed his profile on the computer to that of a serious armed criminal (and "Thailand's tallest prostitute") to make it less boring. This resulted in Jonny being shot in the knee in the grounds of Halton Castle, for which Louise was arrested and charged with "incitement to GBH". She had a brief stint as the manager of the Sayers' bakery in which Janet worked, but was eventually fired after sacking all of her employees. Near the end of the sixth series, it is revealed that Louise is pregnant by Donna's younger brother Dion. In series seven she resides with Janet and Corinthian and has found out that she is carrying a baby girl; this disappoints her as she fears the baby girl might be "prettier" than she is. In the last episode of series 7 she gives birth, somewhat assisted by Munch, and although she initially agrees to call the baby "Louise Munch Brooks" she decides that the name Munch disgusts her and names the baby "Louise Louise Brooks". In series 8 Louise is seen at first struggling to bond and care for her baby until Tim and Janet reassure her she will be a great Mum and that she will always have their support. In episode 7 Louise meets her new popstar boyfriend, Scott Chegg. By series 9, she's left Runcorn and 'joined that weird moon-worshipping cult'. She was originally going to be back for series nine as her character was supposed to come back to Runcorn with her boyfriend but Drysdale was busy filming in Spain for the fourth series of the hit comedy Benidorm.

=== Tim Claypole ===
- Played by: Luke Gell (Series 7–9)

Tim Claypole (who shares his name with the mischievous and delightfully campy jester Timothy Claypole from the children's TV show Rentaghost) is the new bar manager of The Archer at the start of Series 7. He turns it into a John Barrowman theme pub, although the only evidence of the John Barrowman theme is a single framed photograph. He temporarily employs Janet as a barmaid before hiring Donna, who soon takes over his position as manager. Although appearing to be gay, he maintains that he is happily married to a rugby-playing wife named Helena and has children. In series 8 Tim is more involved with the group in helping solve their problems such as advising Donna to stay away from Gaz. By series 9, Tim has given the Archer a makeover and has made peace with his best friends Gaz and Donna, but then his younger sister Cassie arrives into his life and causes chaos. With the arrival of Cassie and all the subsequent changes in his life, Tim reveals that Helena has left him and he is gay. He later meets a new love interest, Leonard.

=== Wesley Presley ===
- Played by: Thomas Nelstrop (Series 8)

Wesley is Donna's London boyfriend whom she met off-screen during series 7; a businessman turned market trader, he moves to Runcorn in series 8 to be with Donna, demanding that she divorce Gaz. But after advice from Gaz as to how to integrate into Runcorn, he takes it all too seriously and is tasered by Janet. He gives Janet a job on his market stall, selling Val Doonican CDs and other things. He appears for the last time in the musical special, where he says that he "came here [to Runcorn] with Donna, but he stays for the pasties." He is a father, though Donna is not aware of this.

=== Billy McCormack ===
- Played by: Freddie Hogan (Series 9)

Metrosexual scouser (resident of Merseyside) Billy longs to be a professional footballer - but in the meantime, he's a carer, and a rather enthusiastic one at that. Always saying "Alright babe," Billy is open about his feelings and starts off as a carer for the newly wheelchair-using Gaz. Billy wants Gaz to like him but says things such as "suck my cock" which doesn't impress Gaz. Billy manages to prove himself to be a hero and friend to Gaz and Donna when their flat is burned down and he saves them. Gaz tries to repay Billy by getting him a chance to be a footballer, but Billy just gets drunk instead. Billy later falls for Cassie and they start a relationship which almost ends in the final episode when she has to choose between him and her ex.

=== Cassie Claypole ===
- Played by: Georgia Henshaw (Series 9)

A trouble-maker, Cassie's just been released from a young offenders' Institution. She's Tim's sister, and although he'd rather like it if she left The Archer, her old school crush, Billy, is a regular, so she's not going anywhere. Cassie is sarcastic and often cruel to her brother and everyone around her, yet if the love of her life Billy pays her a shred of a compliment, she turns into a screaming girl. She attempts dozens of times to impress Billy, dressing up as Lady Gaga and doing what Gaz says because he can supposedly get Billy to "shag" her. In episode 4, Cassie goes on a date with Billy which turns unsuccessful. When she realises Billy likes to be bossed about, they begin a relationship. In the final episode Cassie's ex-boyfriend turns up at The Archer with Cassie having to choose whom to be with and she ends up choosing Billy.

=== Munch Wilkinson ===
- Played by: Lee Oakes (Series 3–5, 7)

"Munch" (whose real name is never revealed in the programme) appears one day at the garage where Gaz works, and turns out to be his long-lost half-brother. Gaz finds that he's "a bit of a yoghurt" and is not allowed to hang around people too much. Munch would love to have a girlfriend but must make do with the 'girl with sick on her' every Friday night. He develops a fixation for Donna after stumbling across her waiting for Gaz while wearing her kinky nurse's outfit. His attempts to attract women are usually unsuccessful due to his social ineptness- he once asked a "desperate" woman in The Archer if she'd like to "see me knob". He did, however, have a very brief relationship with Kelly the barmaid. Munch likes Vimto (according to him it is "big, clever and purple, like the prime minister" and "a really mellow high" - believing it to be alcoholic and also a type of Wine ), salt and vinegar chipsticks, brown sauce and stale bread sandwiches. He often calls Gaz "Mr. Wilkinson", and it appears his sole talent is to make defunct car engines work. Munch disappears after the series 5 episode "Fat", but returns in series 7, appearing to have found God while in Birmingham. An irate Gaz forces him to drink a glass of Vimto, and he reverts to the Munch of old. In the last episode of series 7, he helps Louise give birth to a baby girl in the Archer, Louise Louise Brooks. This is his last appearance in the programme.

=== Flo Henshaw ===
- Played by: Beverley Callard (Series 1–3)

Flo Henshaw (13 January 1959 – 24 July 2004) is Donna's mother, and nicknames herself "the thinking man's strumpet". She has also modelled for top shelf magazines such as Readers Wives and Pregnant Mums. Early in the series, she shows interest in Gaz, who finds this worrying, and on one occasion is caught by Jonny in suspicious circumstances with Janet's father Pete Smith. However, Flo offers Donna some useful advice when things are not going well with Gaz. She does not appear in series 4 (Callard had by this time returned to her role in Coronation Street), and by the start of series 5 she has been killed off in a traffic accident. Donna finds out that all the "uncles" she had were actually Flo's lovers. Flo is still mentioned throughout the series after her death and in series 5 Donna has moved back to her mum's home after briefly splitting with Gaz before selling it at the end of the series.

=== Kelly Crabtree ===
- Played by: Hayley Bishop (Series 4–6)

Kelly is first seen working at the local Sayers' Bakery, where she is a sycophantic lackey to Louise, lacking self-confidence. Later in the series, she is the regular barmaid at The Archer and has become voraciously promiscuous, even with the pub's elderly regulars, particularly Arthur. Kelly even has a brief relationship with Munch, but leaves him jammed into a playground swing. When she is denied the job of manager, she remains in the Archer, working for Janet, and is last seen smothered by crisp wrappers in the final episode of series 6.

=== Leonard ===
- Played by: Samuel Barnett (Series 9)

Leonard is introduced in series 9 when Tim begins to look for a relationship after coming out as gay. He is from Frodsham and is openly gay. He shows interest in Tim and decides to ask him out on a date, to which Tim agrees.

=== Kate ===
- Played by: Alison Mac (Series 4)

Kate is a temporary barmaid at The Archer and becomes Jonny's girlfriend after he splits up with Janet. Having a lot in common with Jonny, especially a love of biscuits, she and Jonny are almost constantly having sex. None of the others are fond of her, and after Gaz tries to seduce her to break them up, Kate resolves to take Jonny away from them and they leave Janet's house together. Kate is possessive towards Jonny and has a patronising attitude toward his friends, which (along with Kate forcing him to leave his beer behind) ultimately leads to Jonny dumping her.

=== David Fish ===
- Played by: Jonathon Dutton (Series 3–4)

In series 3 Louise gets a valentine card from a secret admirer who turns out to be a geeky guy from her schooldays who has turned into a rather good-looking guy. He has a pseudo-Australian accent since he has been living in Melbourne for the last eight years and is now a student in the area. David performs well on their first night together but not at all the next night, due to exhaustion and (according to him) the "friction burns on my cock". He had also had a one-night stand with Donna a year prior, which upsets Louise and is the source of her grudge against Donna for a while. David is something of a "new-age" man, being interested in self-help books and tai chi. He is eventually dumped by Louise. He then speaks to Donna, observed by Gaz and Jonny, and convinces her to become a student in series 4.

=== Corinthian Keogh ===
- Played by: Lewis Vilamor (Series 5), Jamie and Zoe Ryde-Weller (Series 6), Thea and Sophia Perry, Alfie and Harvie Walters (Series 7), Charlee and Neo Hall, Gabriel and Ethan Claasen (Series 8)

Corinthian McVitie Keogh is the son of Janet Keogh and Gaz Wilkinson; he was born in series 5, nine months after Janet slept with Gaz. The baby's middle name reflects Jonny Keogh's love of biscuits, McVitie's being a biscuit brand. Although Jonny raises him as his own until his death, Corinthian's paternity is initially uncertain. Gaz attempts to claim him in series 6, but doubts he is the father after he learns of his low sperm count. However, in series 7 a DNA test finally reveals Gaz to be the father. Gaz decides not to inform Janet of this, as she sees Corinthian as a reminder of Jonny. In Series 8, the episode "Gazman" finds Gaz applying to family court for parental responsibility for Corinthian, but the boy moves away with Janet before the beginning of the ninth series.

== Minor characters ==
- Katie Henshaw (Vicky Connett) - Katie, introduced in series 1, is Donna's teenage sister, who tries to seduce Gaz.
- Pete Smith (Rob Jarvis) - Pete is Janet's father; protective of her, he does not approve of Jonny. Pete is introduced in series 3 when, offscreen, he refuses Jonny's request to marry Janet, and is first seen in the episode "Hospikal" when he is inveigled into agreeing to pay for the wedding after all when Jonny discovers that Pete is having an affair with Flo. A down-to earth scouser from Toxteth, he works as a builder and plays darts for his local pub team. In Series 4, in the episode "Homeless and Horny", he throws Jonny out of the house he and Janet live in after their break up; this is his last appearance in the series.
- Andy (Oliver Boot) - Janet's previous boyfriend whom she bumps into again in series 2 and they kiss. Although this doesn't lead to anything, Jonny is jealous and confronts Andy in his home in the final episode. While there, Jonny steals a ring which he later uses to propose to Janet. Louise goes out with Andy in the first episode of series 3, attracted by his wealth, but he leaves her to pay the bill in the restaurant, so the girls assume that he wasn't rich after all.
- Phillip (Alan Westaway) - Phillip is Donna's self-confident, but arrogant university tutor; he tries to persuade Donna to have sex with him in return for good marks. Gaz finds out about the arrangement and confronts Phillip while he and Donna are having brunch; this cures Gaz's impotence.
- Arthur - Arthur is the most frequent regular at The Archer, appearing in many scenes but never speaking. He has sex with Kelly on several occasions, and once kisses Jonny in an attempt to find out whether Jonny is really gay. At the beginning of series 7, he has recorded some soundbites, not all of them appropriate, for Louise, to help her through her vocal problem (although the recorded voice is actually Colin McFarlane who played Louise' father in a previous series). He appears through the final episode in series 9; in his final moments Cassie is sticking his head to the table so she can watch him struggle.
- Dion (Robert Hartley) - Dion is Donna's unpleasant teenage brother. His only appearance is in the series 6 episode "Closing Time", although he may have been the unnamed boy at the Henshaw Family Table in the episode "Spunk". Gaz agrees to look after him against Donna's wishes. However, it appears that he has had sex with Louise during her earlier "alcoholism" and is the father of her baby. Donna implies to Gaz that she has asked Dion to move in with them, but by series 7 he has moved to Bolton.
- Brian (Colin McFarlane) - Brian is Louise's biological father, and when she is given a photograph of him she is horrified to discover that he "...wears socks with sandals." Louise tracks him down using only the angle from which the photograph was taken--and the address written on the back. When they meet in The Archer for the first time, it becomes clear that Brian is a con-man. When Jonny turns up, Brian takes a shine to him. Jonny eventually realises that he is gay and rejects him; in turn, Brian reveals that he's an alcoholic.
- Louise Louise Brooks (Gracie Eve, Amelie Rose Pelta and Sofía Dowe) - Louise's baby with Donna's younger brother Dion. Louise tells Munch that as he was her birthing partner, the baby would be named Louise Munch Brooks, but she's lying and instead names her Louise Louise Brooks after herself.

== See also ==
• List of Two Pints of Lager and a Packet of Crisps episodes
