= Tim Dawson =

British screenwriter

- Born: 1988 (age 37–38); Oxford, United Kingdom
- Occupation: Screenwriter
- Writing career
- Period: 2007–present
- Genre: Television
- Subject: Comedy
- Notable works: Coming of Age; Two Pints of Lager and a Packet of Crisps

Tim Dawson (born 1988) is a British screenwriter, writer and journalist best known for his work on a number of comedies and for his pro-Brexit advocacy. Since 2023, he has been editor of BCG Pro.

== Early life and education ==
Dawson grew up in Oxford and moved to Manchester during his late teenage years. He was educated at Abingdon School from 1999 to 2006. During his time at school, Dawson won the North Drama Prize and he was the comedy actor in school productions of Here to Entertain You and The Comedians. He also wrote, produced and directed Bang Goes Douglas Smith.

== Writing career ==
Dawson began his career in 2007 when his original sitcom, Coming of Age, was piloted by BBC Three. The show ran for three series to mixed reviews. Exteriors for the fictional Wooton College were filmed near his hometown in Abingdon, Oxfordshire, while interiors were recorded at BBC Television Centre using a multi-camera setup with a live studio audience.

He also wrote on Series 7 and 8 of Two Pints of Lager and a Packet of Crisps. Dawson was identified as a "Broadcast Hot Shot" in a 2008 edition of the industry magazine Broadcast.

In 2018, Dawson is recorded as writer of episode 1.3 of Lady Christina, (Portrait of a Lady) a series of audio dramas spun-off from Doctor Who and made by Big Finish Productions. The episode was described as "a James Bond homage that's more Roger Moore and less Daniel Craig" featuring Lady Christina and UNIT's Sam Bishop.

Not for Turning, a radio drama by Dawson, was broadcast on BBC Radio 4 in September 2020.

Dawson has written for a number of comedians, Adrian Edmondson, Stephen K. Amos, Dick and Dom, Joe Pasquale, and Jon Culshaw.

In 2026, Dawson released his latest work, The Red Prince, directed by Susan Nickson. The one-person show, performed by Benjamin May, follows fictional Labour MP Craig Kitman across an hour-long monologue set in his constituency office. The production received a positive review from Everything Theatre.

In addition to his drama and comedy writing, Dawson has written articles for The Daily Telegraph, The Spectator, The Critic, Spiked, and the British Comedy Guide.

== Political activity ==
Dawson stood as a Conservative council candidate for the ward of Hulme in the 2018 Manchester City Council elections. He received 182 votes and came 6th in the election. An avid supporter of the arts and creative industries, Dawson described himself as a mainstream Conservative in an article published later that year.

In 2019, The Guardian reported that Dawson was a member of the pro-Brexit organisation Britain's Future, which spent £340,000 on campaign advertisements, more than anyone else spent on political advertising on Facebook. Dawson declared the source of the funds were "small donations from fellow Brexiteers".

Dawson was listed as editor on Britain’s Future’s website.

== Filmography ==
Year	Title	Director	Writer	Notes
2026	The Red Prince	No	Yes	
2025	The House	No	Yes	Creator
2025	The House – Series 1	No	Yes	
2025	Breaking the News – Series 30 (E8, E10)	No	Additional Material	
2020	Not for Turning	No	Yes	
2018	Lady Christina	No	Yes	
2016	Carry On Doctors	No	Yes	In development
2013	The Now Show – Series 41	No	Additional Material	
2011	Coming of Age – Series 3	No	Yes	Also Associate Producer
2010	Coming of Age – Series 2	No	Yes	Also Associate Producer
2009	Two Pints of Lager and a Packet of Crisps – Series 8	No	Yes	
2009	Two Pints of Lager and a Packet of Crisps – Comic Relief	No	Yes	
2008	Coming of Age – Series 1	No	Yes	
2008	Two Pints of Lager and a Packet of Crisps – Series 7	No	Yes	
2007	Coming of Age – Pilot	No	Yes	
2004	Bang! Goes Douglas Smith	Yes	Yes	Creator

== See also ==
- List of Old Abingdonians
