= Richard Mylan =

British actor

- Born: 24 November 1972 (age 53); Swansea, Wales
- Occupation: Actor
- Spouse: Tammie Dineen
- Children: 2

Richard Mylan (born 24 November 1972) is a Welsh actor and former dancer. He is best known for his roles in The Bill, Bad Girls and Grownups as Chris.

== Early life ==
Mylan was born in Swansea in 1973. There he attended the Birchgrove Junior School, where he played rugby, and in 1982 won the Swansea heat of the British 'Disco Kids Championships'. At the age of 12 he left Swansea to study dance in London at the Urdang Academy.

== Career ==
Mylan's first professional job was in the roller-skating musical Starlight Express (1984) at the Apollo Victoria Theatre in London, where he played for about four years, firstly as 'Flat-Top' (he can be heard in the original-cast recording) and afterwards in the bigger role of Electra the Electric Train. He was also in the funk band, Puppy Phat, who played at Ronnie Scott's Jazz Club and elsewhere.

Mylan is best known for playing the role of Oliver Morris in the television sitcom, Coupling (2004), as well as his portrayals of Chris in Grownups (in 2007 and 2009) and Joe Andrews in BBC Wales drama Belonging (in 2006). Other television work has included the role of Danny Flint in Where the Heart Is (in 2005 and 2006), Harry in Wild West (2002-2004), Border Cafe, Ben Phillips in Bad Girls (2004-2005), Leroy Jones in The Bill (1998-2001) and Doctors (as Dr Simon Hills in 2004 and as Will Duncan in 2010). He appeared in the 2009 film City Rats. He also made a guest appearance in TV sitcom My Family in 2007. He played Simon Lowsley, the deputy headteacher, in Waterloo Road until 2014. In 2014, he was cast in The Frantic Assembly performance "The Believers".

== Personal life ==
Mylan is married to makeup artist Tammie Dineen.

In August 2014, Mylan undertook a tandem skydive from 12,000 feet (3,700 m) to raise funds for Autism Puzzles. His son Jaco, who was born in 2005 (with former partner actress Catrin Powell), has a form of autism known as Pervasive Developmental Disorder (PDD). He presented a documentary on the subject of his son and autism which was broadcast on the BBC in April 2017 entitled Richard and Jaco: Life with Autism.

Mylan supports Welsh independence.

Mylan has battled heroin addiction for 20 years as revealed in BBC2 Documentary 'Footlights'.

== Filmography ==
=== Film ===
Year	Film	Role	Notes
1998	Speak Like a Child	Sammy (Age 30)	
1998	The Wisdom of Crocodiles	Gang Member	
1999	Dead on Time	Photographer	Short film
2000	Checkout Girl	Young Man	Short film
2001	Score	Luke	Television film
2001	Be.Angeled	English Pothead	
2001	Dream	Bus Driver	
2003	Y Mabinogi	Pryderi	
2004	The Divine Eugene Hicks	Eugene	Short film
2005	The Upside of Anger	Disc Jockey	
2009	City Rats	Ash	
2010	Mr Easy Guy	Dylan	Short film
2014	Marked	Baz	Television film
2016	Don't Knock Twice	Ben	
2017	Canaries	Nav	
2017	Things I Know to Be True	Ben Price	
2024	Protein	Joe Llewelyn	

=== Television ===
Year	Title	Role	Notes
1994	The Bill	Terry	Episode: "Work Experience"
1998	Casualty	Michael	Episode: "Next of Kin"
1998	The Demon Headmaster	University Student	Recurring role; 2 episodes
1998	The Bill	Glen Bishop	Episode: "You Pays Your Money"
1998	Silent Witness	Rollie Stewart	Episode: "Divided Loyalties"
1999–2001	The Bill	Leroy Jones	Recurring role; 7 episodes
2000	Dirty Work	Lenny Duffield	Episode: "Naked Ambition"
2000	Border Cafe	Beejay	Miniseries; 7 episodes
2000	Welcome to Orty-Fou	LB Sparks	Episode: "Beetlemania"
2002	Always and Everyone	Jamie	Episode: "Do Not Pass Go"
2002–2004	Wild West	Harry King	Series regular; 12 episodes
2003	Casualty	Zac	Episode: "Against Protocol"
2004	Doctors	Dr. Simon Hills	Episode: "Two Can Play: Part 2"
2004	Coupling	Oliver Morris	Series regular; 6 episodes
2004–2005	Bad Girls	Ben	Recurring role; 5 episodes
2005	According to Bex	Hugh	Episode: "Hanging on the Telephone"
2005–2006	Where the Heart Is	Danny Flint	Series regular; 19 episodes
2006	Belonging	Joe	Recurring role; 3 episodes
2007	My Family	Peter	Episode: "Four Affairs and a Funeral"
2007–2009	Grownups	Chris	Series regular; 14 episodes
2008	Casualty	Ian	Episode: "Happiness"
2009	Two Pints of Lager and a Packet of Crisps	Chris	Episode: "Comic Relief Special: When Janet Met Michelle"
2010	Doctors	Will Duncan	Recurring role; 24 episodes
2012	Casualty	Ben Peters	Episode: "Death and Doughnuts"
2013–2014	Waterloo Road	Simon Lowsley	Series regular; 31 episodes
2016	Byw Celwydd	Nadav Weissman	Episode: "Series 1, Episode 8"
2016	Agatha Raisin	Jack The Lad Pomfret	Episode: "The Vicious Vet"
2019	Hidden	Mr. Collins	Episode: "Series 2, Episode 1"
2024	The Way	Lekan	Episode: "The Walk"
