= Grownups (2006 TV series) =

- Genre: Sitcom
- Created by: Susan Nickson
- Directed by: Ben Kellett (series 2 & 3)
- Starring: Sheridan Smith; Steven Meo; Richard Mylan; Warren Brown; Leah MacRae
- Country of origin: United Kingdom
- No. of series: 3
- No. of episodes: 22 (list of episodes)

Production
- Producer: Stephen McCrum
- Running time: 28 minutes

Original release
- Network: BBC Three
- Release: 7 May 2006 – 3 March 2009

Related
- Two Pints of Lager and a Packet of Crisps; Coming of Age

Grownups is a BBC Three sitcom written by Susan Nickson, who also created hit BBC Three sitcom Two Pints of Lager and a Packet of Crisps. It follows the trials and tribulations of a group of twentysomething friends in Manchester, facing the decision to either carry on partying or settle down.

The first episode aired on 7 May 2006 on BBC Three and appeared at number eight on the Broadcasters' Audience Research Board (BARB) top ten of most watched BBC Three programmes for that week. The show made only one more entry on the chart for the rest of the first series, when it reached number nine, some two weeks later.

A second series was produced, with studio recordings taking place between May and July 2007. The first two episodes aired back-to-back on BBC Three on Sunday 5 August. Unlike the first series, the second series displayed more adult humour, including more intense sexual references.

The first episode of the second series appeared at number eight in the BARB weekly top ten for BBC Three, with the second episode which aired immediately afterward, at number nine. A third series was commissioned by the BBC and tickets to see live filming went on sale on the official BBC Tickets website in September 2008. The first episode of the third series aired 13 January 2009.

== Characters ==
- Michelle Booth (Sheridan Smith) is the central character of the show. She is a 27-year-old nutritionist who lives in the trendy Northern Quarter of Manchester. Despite her job, Michelle's life is a contradiction, because she is passionate about alcohol, squirty cream, and her favourite food, Flumps.
- Claire Finnerty (2006–2007) (Fiona Wass) is Michelle's best mate – a beautician. She is very wild and loves biting men. From her behaviour towards both genders, she could be either bisexual or she could be just a single young woman willing to experiment, flirt, and have fun with both genders before settling down.
- Grant Grant (Steven Meo) has fancied Michelle for years, and is always wondering why she has not gone for his Welsh charms. He is a solicitor, sensitive, smart, he has a large obsession with Judge John Deed.
- Mike Booth (2006) (Rob Rouse) is Michelle's brother, who lives with her after being kicked out of his parents' house in the first episode. He is a DJ and has a strange obsession with singing the song he wrote: "DJ Mike, making love to you every night."
- Dean Adewale (2006) (O. T. Fagbenle) is the new man in Michelle's life, although he worries that Michelle is not into commitment.
- Chris (2007–2009) (Richard Mylan) replaced Mike as Michelle's flatmate. They know each other from university and he is studying for a PhD. Is apparently extremely well endowed, having compared his penis to a can of Red Bull and his testicles to Ribena berries on anabolic steroids.
- Rachel (2007) (Naomi Bentley) is Michelle and Claire's boss. She is very rich and just as mental. Her dialogue (and very male growl) suggest that she could be a transsexual.
- Alex Salade (2007–2009) (Warren Brown) is a barman at Bar Salade where the cast often go out for social drinking. Alex removes his shirt at every given opportunity, going as far as creating reasons; for instance, deliberately spilling a drink and being "forced" to mop it up with his shirt. He has a huge ego (when Chris tried to fight with Alex, he replied: "I wouldn't do that. You see, I'm really, really, really, really, really hard ... and hot.").
- Jenny (2009) (Leah MacRae) is a barmaid who works alongside Alex in Bar Salade, described as Michelle's best friend. Alex fancies Jenny, but Jenny fancies Grant.

== Critical reception ==
The British Comedy Guide gave the show a negative review, stating " Grownups is as far, far away from being able to be called a good sitcom as is possible" and criticised the show for having "wooden setups and weak jokes".

== Episodes ==
=== Series 1 (2006) ===
No. overall	No. in season	Title	Original release date
1	1	"Sour Milk"	7 May 2006
After waking up with a boyfriend whose name she doesn't even know, Michelle decides to turn her life around. First, she must get rid of her sour milk in the fridge, get a new plant, and most importantly, sort her life out. But it doesn't help when her brother Mike wants to come and stay.
2	2	"Givesies"	14 May 2006
Michelle tells her boyfriend Dean that she loves him, but he says it's too early in their relationship to love each other. After a small argument, Dean decides to give in and learn to say that he loves her. But the only thing he can think of that he loves is Conan the Barbarian! Meanwhile, Mike must come to terms with his two fears: the darkness and Natasha Kaplinsky.
3	3	"Naked Splitty Dress Girl"	21 May 2006
Dean buys Michelle a size-14 dress, but she cannot fit into it. Claire tells her it's probably because of her bad binge-eating habit. After attempting to lose weight, she tries on the dress and it just-barely fits her. She goes to the party at the local bar (Bar Saladé), and splits her dress. It turns out that she has been wearing an age 14 dress.
4	4	"Reflectomoz"	28 May 2006
Mike purchases a new mirror from eBay with a picture of Morrissey on the right-hand side. He then sees a picture of a new microphone which apparently makes "your voice sound like The Count from Sesame Street", but needs £200 to buy it, so he starts selling Michelle's clothes on eBay to pay for it.
5	5	"Poorly"	4 June 2006
Michelle is allowed to work from home, but is persistently distracted by Dean; Mike is depressed at being almost 30, so considers Botox; while Grant desperately tries to fake a serious ailment as an excuse for staying off work to help Mike.
6	6	"Tronsian Tronsian O Answawdd Da"	11 June 2006
Dean's lack of respect for Michelle's career as a nutritionist causes problems as she endeavours to show just how vital her job is. Mike offers to fix Michelle's moped after he drives it into the local canal; and Grant makes a play for Michelle.
7	7	"Surprise!"	18 June 2006
Michelle tries to dump her boyfriend, and Mike is bitten by a tramp.
8	8	"Chimps"	25 June 2006
Michelle has a spare ticket for a secret gig and stages a Scrabble competition and a penalty shoot-out to decide who will accompany her, while Mike finds spiritual guidance in a leaflet from The Giving Family.

=== Series 2 (2007) ===
No. overall	No. in season	Title	Original release date
9	1	"Moose"	5 August 2007
When Michelle's new flatmate Chris calls her immature, Michelle tries to show him just how grown up she is by marrying Grant. Claire falls for Chris, but he seems more interested in books than in her, so she resolves to seduce him, come what may.
10	2	"Send"	12 August 2007
When Grant dates Michelle's gorgeous friend Chloe, Michelle gets jealous and resorts to underhand tactics to split them up. Claire resolves not to sleep with anyone outside marriage just as Chris realises that the only woman he wants to sleep with is Claire.
11	3	"Bleurgh"	19 August 2007
Gorgeous barman Alex rejects Michelle because she's vain, so Michelle determines to win him back by becoming the ugliest woman in Manchester. To overcome his obsession with Michelle, Grant vows to go home to Swansea, but he is hijacked on his way to the station by Michelle's deranged boss, Rachel. Chris prepares to take out his sexual frustrations on a watermelon.
12	4	"Ring"	26 August 2007
When Grant's new lover Rachel demands that he stop seeing Michelle, Michelle enlists the help of a blow-up sex doll to persuade Grant to confront her and gets fired. Chris discovers that being engaged makes him a love god, but when he refuses to buy Claire a ring, she finds herself slipping back into her slutty old ways.
13	5	"Honk"	2 September 2007
When Michelle tries to get her old job back at Glo gym her boss Rachel relegates her to the position of towel girl, so Michelle resorts to a novel interview technique to get a job as Grant's PA. Chris takes Claire to meet his parents and discovers that they share a revolting secret.
14	6	"Clap"	9 September 2007
Michelle and Grant take action to remove Grant's bullying boss, but their plan backfires when Michelle takes some drugs, and Grant dumps her. When Chris gets the clap, the disease badly affects his hair, and Claire dumps him. The dumpees, Michelle and Chris, take comfort in each other's arms.

=== Series 3 (2009) ===
No. overall	No. in season	Title	Original release date
15	1	"Convenient Puppy"	13 January 2009
In a bid to win Grant over, Michelle throws herself in the canal (to try to get Grant to be a hero) after Grant and Claire enter the flat to see her having sex with Chris. In a quest to mend his broken heart, Chris accidentally kills the puppy he adopted that was intended for Grant. Alex falls for Jenny whilst Jenny falls for Chris.
16	2	"Winks"	20 January 2009
In a bid to help Alex pick up trade at Bar Salade, Grant reluctantly agrees to take part in an illegal underground tiddlywink betting ring. Jenny decides to date sexy older man Chris, while Michelle tries to change her promiscuous ways.
17	3	"Little Blind Boy"	27 January 2009
Michelle's failing attempts to have a threesome hit rock bottom when she ends up in bed with Grant and Chris. Grant climbs a building site dressed as Kylie Minogue to appease a young boy. Chris organises a very adult book group which fails to impress Jenny.
18	4	"Clam Up"	3 February 2009
Michelle's lesson in responsibility backfires when Alex asks her to marry him. Grant gets caught having sex with his legal secretary at work. Jenny helps Chris with his essay about the modern woman.
19	5	"Cow"	10 February 2009
Michelle tries her hand at providing 'care in the community'. But it all ends in Bar Salade with Chris drinking milk, Grant riding a cow, Jenny dressed as a ghost and a little person forcing Alex to run through the sheet glass window.
20	6	"No Win, No Fee"	17 February 2009
Michelle and Jenny's girlie night out ends in disaster. Grant maims pensioners in his bid to drum up business for his law firm. Alex comes face to face with his fear of little people and runs through a sheet glass window, yet again. Chris discovers he's a daddy and has been for the past sixteen years.
21	7	"Me, Me, Me"	24 February 2009
Michelle visits 'Alex' in hospital and realises, for a very short moment, that she's not actually the centre of the universe. Jenny and Grant get to know each other better and Chris meets his son.
22	8	"Balls"	3 March 2009
Chris has money worries and searches for a new flatmate. Alex and Jenny look after Grant while he deals with the lump on his testicle. Michelle is forced to choose between fame and friendship.

== Two Pints: Comic Relief Special 2009 ==
The cast of Two Pints of Lager and a Packet of Crisps, Grownups and Coming of Age starred in the first episode of the eighth series of Two Pints for Comic Relief. All of the regular cast from all three shows appeared. The episode was subtitled "When Janet Met Michelle". Sheridan Smith (who played Michelle in Grownups and Janet in Two Pints of Lager) appeared in both roles, by use of camera tricks and a body double.
