= Extra virgin =

Extra virgin may refer to:

- Extra virgin, a grade of olive oil acidity, sometimes incorrectly used to describe other kinds of oil.

== Entertainment ==
- Extra Virgin, TV cooking series for Cooking Channel with Debi Mazar
- Extra Virgin, Freddie Hogan nominated for the Offie
- Extra Virgin, Thai distributor of Enemies of the People (film)
- Extra Virgin (album), a 1996 album by Olive
- Extra Virgin (band), Rogers Stevens
- Extra Virgin Orchestra, Helen Bowater
