= 'Orrible =

- Genre: Sitcom
- Written by: Johnny Vaughan; Ed Allen
- Directed by: Dominic Brigstocke
- Country of origin: United Kingdom
- Original language: English
- No. of series: 1
- No. of episodes: 8

Production
- Executive producers: Sophie Clarke-Jervoise; Geoffrey Perkins
- Producers: Bradley Adams; Michael Jacob
- Production locations: Acton, West London
- Running time: 30 minutes

Original release
- Network: BBC Two
- Release: 10 September – 29 October 2001

'Orrible is a British television sitcom produced by the BBC. Broadcast in 2001, it was written by and starred Johnny Vaughan. Vaughan stars as a cheeky chappy taxi-cab driver and wannabe small-time criminal in Acton, west London. Despite the BBC being confident and heavily promoting the series, it was panned by critics for the script and Vaughan's acting ability. It achieved very low viewing figures and ran for one series, and has never been repeated by the BBC. "Ultimately, it was shit" said Vaughan in a 2004 interview in The Stage. James Buckley made his acting debut playing Sean's son (and Paul's godson) in the sixth episode, Two Men and a Bastard

== Cast ==
- Johnny Vaughan – Paul Clark
- Ricky Grover – Sean
- Angel Coulby – Shiv Clark
- Di Botcher – Di Clark
- Lee Oakes – Lee
- William Boyde – Tim
- Clint Dyer – Noel
