= Beverley Callard =

English actress (born 1957)

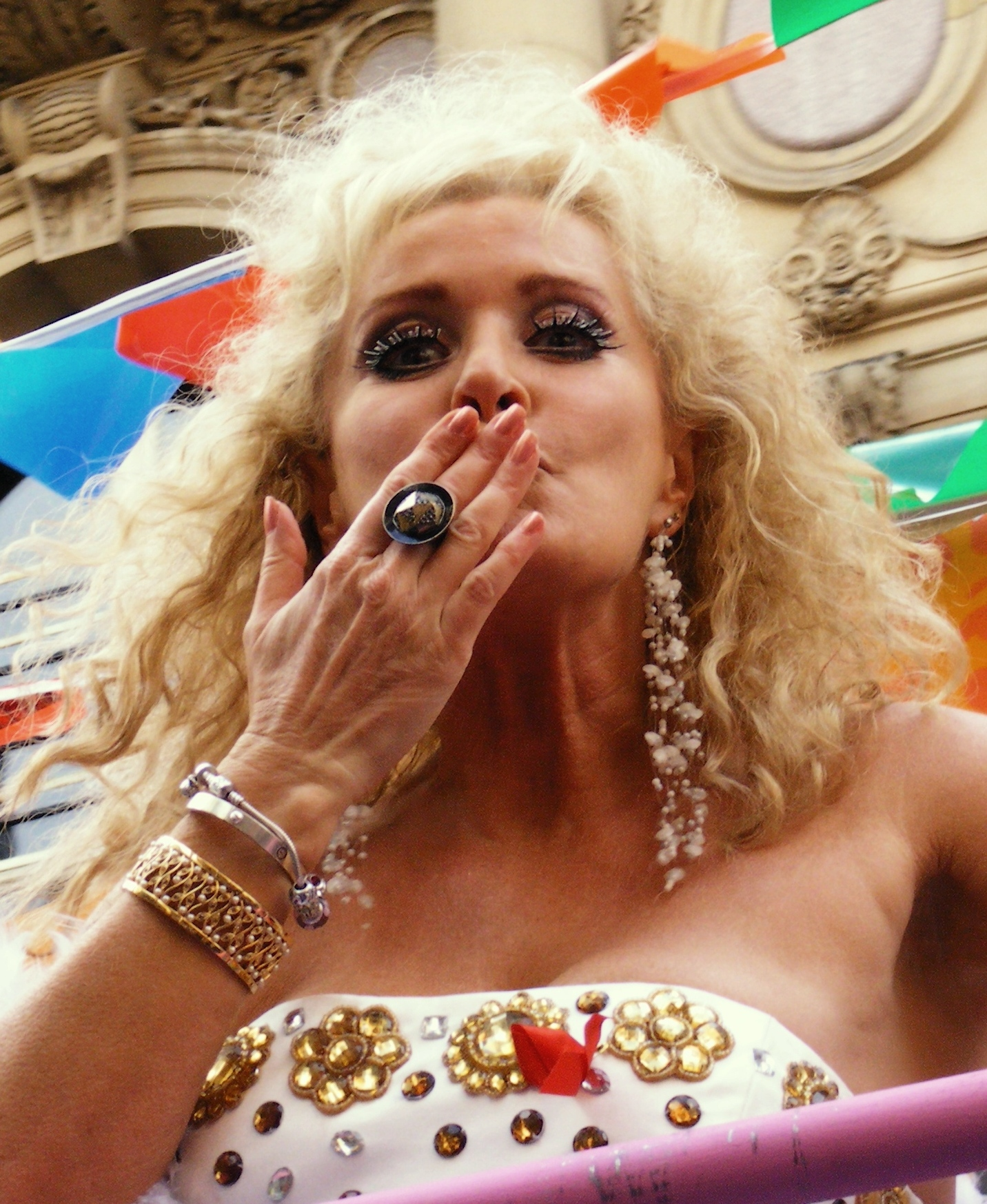
- Callard in 2010
- Born: Beverley Jane Moxon; 28 March 1957 (age 69); Morley, West Riding of Yorkshire, England
- Occupation: Actress
- Years active: 1982–present
- Television: Emmerdale Farm; Coronation Street; The Peter Principle; Two Pints of Lager and a Packet of Crisps; I'm a Celebrity...Get Me Out of Here!
- Spouses: Paul Atkinson (m. 1974; div. 1978); David Sowden (m. 1980; div. 1988); Steve Callard (m. 1989; div. 2001); Jon McEwan (m. 2010)
- Children: 2, including Rebecca

Beverley Jane McEwan (née Moxon; previously Atkinson, Sowden and Callard; born 28 March 1957) is an English actress, known for her role as Liz McDonald in the long-running ITV soap opera Coronation Street (1989–1998, 2000–2001, 2003–2011, 2013–2020). She has also portrayed Flo Henshaw in Two Pints of Lager and a Packet of Crisps (2001–2003) and Lily Patterson in the RTÉ soap opera Fair City (2026–present). Callard has released several fitness videos and has also appeared as a contestant on I'm a Celebrity...Get Me Out of Here! (2020), as well as its spin-off series, I'm a Celebrity... South Africa (2026).

== Early life ==
Callard was born Beverley Jane Moxon on 28 March 1957 in Morley, West Yorkshire to Clive (1929–1978), a baker and Mavis Moxon (née Brook; 1930–2012), a concert pianist. She had younger siblings, a brother Clive, who died at birth in 1960, and a sister Stephanie, six years her junior. Callard attended Bruntcliffe Academy.

== Career ==
At the age of seven, Callard made her acting debut as Darius the page boy. After leaving school in 1973, she took a job as a shorthand typist. She later turned to acting and appeared on stage as Jackie Coryton in Noël Coward's Hay Fever, Liz and Rita in Billy Liar and The Wicked Queen in Snow White. Callard made her television debut (as Beverley Sowden) in the Yorkshire Television soap Emmerdale Farm as Angie Richards in 1983. Other roles followed, including parts in Hinge & Bracket: Dear Ladies, Hells Bells, Will You Love Me Tomorrow and The Practice.

Callard released books and exercise videos including Real Results, Rapid Results, Ultimate Results and Lasting Results. She also appeared on GMTV and This Morning and has had a fitness page in the Daily Mirror.

In 2000, she played the part of Barbara in the BBC sitcom The Peter Principle. In 2001, Callard was cast as Flo Henshaw in the BBC Three sitcom Two Pints of Lager and a Packet of Crisps and continued in the role for two years. During this time, she also guested on Sky1's Mile High. Between June and December 2010, Callard was a recurring panellist on ITV's talk show Loose Women.

She was due to appear as the Wicked Queen in the Christmas pantomime Sleeping Beauty at the Lyceum Theatre, Sheffield, from December 2011, but had to withdraw from the production for undisclosed health reasons. She was subsequently replaced by her former Coronation Street co-star Margi Clarke. She made her return to the stage in 2012 playing Mari Hoff in a British touring production of The Rise and Fall of Little Voice. In 2019, she performed in a touring production of The Rocky Horror Picture Show at the Liverpool Empire.

In November 2020, it was announced that Callard would take part in the twentieth series of I'm a Celebrity...Get Me Out of Here. Callard became the fourth celebrity to be voted off, alongside Victoria Derbyshire on 30 November.

In 2022, Callard appeared in Gold comedy Newark, Newark, as Pauline. In 2023, Callard was announced as one of the participants on Channel 4 series Don't Look Down, in aid of Stand Up to Cancer. In 2024, Callard appeared as Pauline, a psychic, in an episode of the BBC sitcom Mandy.

In 2026, she returned I'm a Celebrity as one of the contestants on the second series of I'm a Celebrity... South Africa. She withdrew from the show on medical grounds after 12 days in camp, which she later revealed to be the start of her cancer diagnosis.

=== Coronation Street ===
In 1984, Callard played Gail (Helen Worth) and Brian Tilsley's (Christopher Quinten) friend June Dewhurst in Coronation Street. In 1989, she returned to the series in the regular role of Liz McDonald. Callard's first appearance as Liz aired on 27 October 1989. Callard's character of Liz McDonald has since been abused, a kidnap victim, a harassed mother and an unfaithful wife. Callard left Coronation Street in November 1998 to concentrate on her other career as an aerobics instructor and to spend more time with her family. In 2003, she returned to Coronation Street. In March 2011, Callard returned to Coronation Street having left for a short break in November 2010. Her final scenes aired in April 2011 as she left. In May 2013, it was announced that she would reprise her role as Liz in the soap again, returning on screen in October 2013. In March 2016, Callard announced a two-month break from the series, as a result of her ongoing battle with clinical depression. She returned to filming in May 2016. In November 2019, Callard announced her departure from Coronation Street. Her final scenes aired in 2020.

=== Fair City ===
In January 2026, it was announced that Callard would join the cast of RTÉ's long-running soap opera, Fair City. She began filming in January 2026 and first appeared on screen in February 2026 as Lily Patterson, the long-lost mother of established character Gwen Connolly.

== Personal life ==
Aged 16, Callard, then pregnant, married Paul Atkinson in 1974. She later miscarried. Two years later, the couple had their first child, Rebecca Callard, who later became an actress. A year later, the couple divorced, with Callard later recalling: "We were too young. He had an alcohol-induced violent side."

In 1980, Callard married David Sowden, an economics teacher. During the marriage, Callard had an abortion. In 1988, the couple separated amicably. Callard became pregnant in 1989 by Steve Callard, and the couple married. Their son, Joshua, was born in 1990. The pair separated due to Steve's infidelity, once occurring whilst Callard was recovering from cervical cancer treatment.

In 2008, it was announced that Callard's pay, along with other Coronation Street cast members, would be cut due to the credit crunch. She lost 40% of her earnings.

In 2016, Callard spoke about her nervous breakdown in 2009 and her depression.

Callard lived with her fourth husband, Jon McEwan, in Eccles, Salford, Greater Manchester. They married on 30 October 2010, at the Hazelwood Castle Hotel, near Leeds. In 2022 they moved to Norfolk. In 2026 Callard's acting firm went into voluntary liquidation owing more than £100,000 to various creditors including HMRC, having only repaid £7,500 of director's loans which the liquidators deemed as "acceptable on the basis that, given the directors' financial position, it was unlikely that any further recoveries would be possible".

In February 2026, Callard revealed on The Late Late Show that she had been diagnosed with early-stage breast cancer; she had surgery later that month.

== Filmography ==
Year	Title	Role	Notes
1983	Shades of Darkness	Rhoda	Series 1, episode 2: "The Intercessor"
1983	Emmerdale	Angie Richards	Series 1, 13 episodes
1984	Love and Marriage	Make-up girl / Young Nurse	Series 1, 2 episodes: "Lucifer" and "A Matter of Will"
1984	Dear Ladies	Hairdresser	Series 3, episode 8: "Oh, Mr. Mayor"
1984	Coronation Street	June Dewhurst	3 episodes
1985	The Practice	Maureen Riley	Series 1, 3 episodes
1986	Hell's Bells	Janey	Series 1, episode 3: "Back Page Story"
1987	Screen Two	Policewoman in Cell	Series 3, episode 3: "Will You Love Me Tomorrow"
1989–1998, 2000–2001, 2003–2011, 2013–2020	Coronation Street	Liz McDonald	Regular role; 2,362 episodes
2000	The Peter Principle	Barbara	Series 2, 6 episodes
2000	Casualty	Laura Hughes	Series 15, episode 8: "Sympathy for the Devil"
2001–2003	Two Pints of Lager and a Packet of Crisps	Flo Henshaw	Series 1–3, 19 episodes
2002	The Bill	Chrissie Hendry	Series 18, episode 25: "Walking on Water"
2004	Mile High	Carole	Series 2, episode 5
2010	East Street	Liz McDonald	Charity crossover between Coronation Street and EastEnders
2010, 2012–2013, 2016–2021	Loose Women	Herself / Presenter	29 episodes
2011	Bloody Norah	Jacquie	Television film
2012	In with the Flynns	Pat	Series 2, 2 episodes: "Liam Flynn, Party Legend" and "Life is Sweet"
2020	The Queen Vic Quiz Night	Liz McDonald	Charity special
2020	I'm a Celebrity...Get Me Out of Here!	Herself / Contestant	Contestant; series 20
2022	Newark, Newark	Pauline	Series 1, 3 episodes
2022	Meet the Richardsons	Herself	Series 3, episode 8
2023	Don't Look Down	Herself / Participant	In aid of Stand Up to Cancer
2024	Mandy	Pauline	Series 3, episode 3: "Humandy Statue"
2026–present	Fair City	Lily Patterson	Regular role
2026	I'm a Celebrity...South Africa	Herself	Contestant; series 2

== Stage ==
Year	Title	Role	Notes
1998–1999	Snow White and the Seven Dwarfs	Wicked Queen	Cambridge Corn Exchange, Cambridge
2012–2013	The Rise and Fall of Little Voice	Mari Hoff	UK Tour (Various Locations)
2019	The Rocky Horror Show	The Narrator	UK Tour (Various Locations)
2019	The Thunder Girls	Roxanne	The Lowry, Manchester
2023–2024	Sleeping Beauty	Evil Fairy	Theatre Royal, Norwich, Norwich

== Awards and nominations ==
Year	Award	Category	Result	Ref.
2008	Digital Spy Soap Awards	Best On-Screen Partnership (shared with Simon Gregson)	Nominated	
2015	Inside Soap Awards	Best Actress	Nominated	
2019	24th National Television Awards	Serial Drama Performance	Nominated	
