= Coming of Age (British TV series) =

British sitcom TV series

- Genre: Sitcom
- Created by: Tim Dawson
- Written by: Tim Dawson
- Directed by: Ed Bye; Nick Wood; David Sant
- Starring: Anabel Barnston; Tony Bignell; Hannah Job; Ceri Phillips; Joe Tracini; Minnie Crowe; Ellen Thomas; Matthew Earley
- Theme music composer: KateGoes
- Opening theme: "Coming of Age"
- Ending theme: "Coming of Age"
- Country of origin: United Kingdom
- Original language: English
- No. of series: 3
- No. of episodes: 23

Production
- Executive producer: Jo Sargent
- Producer: Simon London
- Editors: Richard Halleday; Mark Lawrence
- Running time: 30 mins.

Original release
- Network: BBC Three; BBC HD
- Release: 21 May 2007 – 8 March 2011

Coming of Age is a British sitcom, written by Tim Dawson, produced in house by BBC Productions, and broadcast on the former channel BBC Three. The show takes a direct look at five sixth form students, Jas, Ollie, Matt, Chloe and DK, as well as, from series three, new character Robyn Crisp, who are living in Abingdon. Their lives rotate around the fictional Wooton College, their bedrooms, and Ollie's garden shed. A pilot originally aired in 2007, followed by the first series in 2008, a second series in 2010, and a third beginning in January 2011. In 2011, the show was cancelled along with other long running BBC Three programmes including Ideal, Two Pints of Lager and a Packet of Crisps, Hotter Than My Daughter, and Doctor Who Confidential. The first series was released on DVD on 26 October 2009, however, no further series have been released on DVD.

== Recording ==
(From left to right) Minnie Crowe, Hannah Job, Ceri Phillips, Joe Tracini, Tony Bignell, Anabel Barnston, Ellen Thomas.

Coming of Age is set in Abingdon, Oxfordshire. Although the show consists of scenes recorded on location and pre-recorded studio scenes, most of the show is recorded in front of a live studio audience at BBC Television Centre, White City, London. Wooton College external shots were filmed at Abingdon and Witney College, Abingdon Campus.

== Theme ==
The Coming of Age production team joined forces with BBC Introducing, a BBC-wide project that supports unsigned, undiscovered and under-the-radar artists and DJs, to find the original theme tune and sound for the show. They held a competition for six up-and-coming artists including KateGoes, to write a theme tune for the show from a written specification. KateGoes won and the theme was recorded in the studio of Richie Webb whose credits include That Mitchell and Webb Look and Comedy Shuffle, to create the final theme tune for the show.

== Cast ==
Actor	Character	Duration	No. of series	Episodes
Tony Bignell	Matthew "Matt" Cobbett	Pilot, 1–3	3	23
Joe Tracini	Darren "DK" Karrimore	Pilot, 1–3	3	23
Hannah Job	Jasmine "Jas" Brown	1–3	3	22
Ceri Phillips	Oliver "Ollie" Sinclair	1–3	3	22
Anabel Barnston	Chloe "Clo" Wheeler	1–3	3	22
Ellen Thomas	Jane Reed	1–3	3	19
Matthew Earley	Wilberforce De Wilde	2–3	2	11
Minnie Crowe	Robyn "Rob" Crisp	3	1	8
Alex Kew	Oliver "Ollie" Sinclair	Pilot	Pilot	1
Amy Yamazaki	Jasmine "Jas" Brown	Pilot	Pilot	1
Dani Harmer	Chloe "Clo" Wheeler	Pilot	Pilot	1

== Episodes ==
Twenty-three episodes of Coming of Age were broadcast over the course of three series. There are number of differences between the pilot and the subsequent series. Most notably, Alex Kew and Amy Yamazaki, who played Ollie and Jas in the pilot, have been replaced by Ceri Phillips and Hannah Job. Also, Dani Harmer originally played Chloe, but was replaced by Anabel Barnston. As well as new sets, the theme tune also changed, from "Steady, As She Goes" by The Raconteurs to a specially written piece by Birmingham band KateGoes and Richie Webb.

=== Pilot (2007) ===
No.	Title	Directed by	Written by	Original release date
1	"Pilot"	David Sant	Tim Dawson	21 May 2007
Matt's dreams come true when his best friend Chloe gives him an unexpected night-time treat. Jas tries a new technique with her piccolo to persuade boyfriend Ollie to tell his mother about their relationship. When DK is arrested for drink-driving, he learns it is better to spit than to swallow.

=== Series 1 (2008) ===
No.	Title	Directed by	Written by	Original release date
1	"B... lowjob"	David Sant	Tim Dawson	30 September 2008
DK fancies fat girl Sky, but will his unusual seduction techniques – a mix of chocolate, rap and breakdancing – succeed in getting her into bed, or will he have to resort to wooing her with pies? It is essay time. Matt steals Chloe's essay to make sure he achieves a good grade, which annoys her a lot. Jas tries to get her grade improved by flirting with teacher Simon Dixon - but her boyfriend, Ollie, becomes madly jealous. He decides to teach Jas a lesson by going off with Sky. Furious and hurt, Jas and Chloe take revenge on Matt, Ollie and Simon by sending them into the swimming pool blindfolded.
2	"Dick and Fanny"	David Sant	Tim Dawson	7 October 2008
Matt and Chloe are in the school play together, and have to kiss. Chloe is excited, but Matt's nerves get the better of him: he cannot brig himself to kiss Chloe. She undergoes a sexy makeover to entice Matt, but when this has no effect on him she concludes he must be gay. His mates Ollie and DK are not convinced, and give Matt a practical lesson in the art of snogging. Will Matt now find the courage to kiss Chloe live on stage? Ollie's phone is stolen by a little girl, and the shame affects his sex drive. When Jas' array of seduction techniques have no effect on Ollie's penis, she takes drastic action to stiffen Ollie's resolve, involving viagra and a Jack Daniel's bottle. DK is desperate to buy a moped, as he thinks it will guarantee him loads of sex. With no job prospects, DK decides there is only one way to earn the money – doing dangerous stunts.
3	"I Suck Coppers"	David Sant	Tim Dawson	14 October 2008
Driving home drunk from Chloe's, DK is pulled over by a policeman. He swallows a load of copper coins, falsely believing that the copper will neutralise the alcohol in his breath. He swallows all the coins and later parts of his body start going green. He is delighted, and shows his green penis to girls at college, wrongly believing that they will find it attractive. Chloe finally agrees to go out with Matt, but only if he starts eating a healthy diet. As Matt hates vegetables, Chloe comes up with a foolproof test to make sure that Matt is eating his greens by examining his faeces. He does not, so gets some from DK. Chloe quickly realises that it is DK's, because it is green and has a coin in it. She then demands that Matt has a colonic irrigation, which Ollie does for him using the tap and hose. When Jas is given the chance to fulfil her dreams of going to London to star in The Rocky Horror Show, Ollie is worried about how they will survive without each other and sex. Jas and Ollie give each other sex dolls which looks like them. Jas returns, having been eliminated from the cast due to having sprained her ankle. She finds that Ollie has brought a girl back to his place, which angers Jas.
4	"We Have Been Naughty Haven't We?"	David Sant	Tim Dawson	21 October 2008
Ollie films Jas naked in the shower and sends DK the clip for £5. When DK promptly forwards the clip to the whole college, Jas is furious and dumps Ollie. Matt is desperate to lose his virginity but, when he tries to move his relationship with Chloe too far too fast for her liking, she friend zones him. Matt sees the film of Jas naked and falls in lust with her. Jas seizes her opportunity to get back at Ollie. She offers Matt what he desperately wants: pity sex. They do not have sex, because after Jas kisses Matt, he ejaculates. Ollie decides that there is only one effective way to get revenge on Jas and Matt: to make them even more jealous of him than he is of them by seducing Chloe. His attempt fails. DK is in trouble for playing pranks on teachers. The principal Jane Reed has found a tough new geography teacher, Andy, who is determined to stop DK misbehaving about in class. DK tries to get Andy sacked by faking his suicide. Andy realises it was faked. Andy quits after DK walks in on him having sex with the principal. Andy's replacement, Katherine, is young and pretty.
5	"Up the Botty"	David Sant	Tim Dawson	28 October 2008
Jas is desperate to receive anal sex from Ollie, in his mother's bed, while she is out at work. Ollie reluctantly agrees, but Jas accidentally defecates in the bed and Ollie's mother returns unexpectedly early. They blame his dog, who is euthanised by the vet. The attempt anal again in Ollie's mother's bed, but again Jas defecates in the bed and his mother comes home. This time, the couple blame Ollie's grandfather, who is subsequently put into a nursing home. When DK drives one of his teachers mad with his bad behaviour in class, the principal forces him to see an educational psychologist. DK is reluctant, until he sees that the psychologist, Stephanie, is young and highly attractive. She says that he is merely an attention seeker. DK reasons that if he wants to keep seeing Stephanie then he has to appear to be insane. His plan works and he is assigned to go on an intense behavioural therapy week. However, she becomes ill, and is replaced by an unattractive, obese colleague. Chloe gives Matt a handjob, which he is pleased with and thinks is a major step towards sexual intercourse. However, she wants to slow things down, so decides to get back to being non-sexual friends with him by behaving like a child. Her plan backfires because seeing her in her old, tight school uniform makes him even more sexually attracted to her.
6	"Pussy Boy"	David Sant	Tim Dawson	4 November 2008
Chloe decides she is ready to lose her virginity with Matt at last, as long as her parents approve. Luckily they do, but when Chloe and Matt go to her bedroom, they discover that Chloe's parents are there and want to stay in the room as Chloe and Matt have sex. Chloe persuades them to leave the room. DK realises that he is unpopular, but he can do amazing magic tricks. At Chloe and Jas's suggestion, he sets out to use his incredible talent to make new friends and lovers. However, his tricks make him more unpopular, especially after he scares the class by pretending to cut his arm. He later turns up unannounced and uninvited in Chloe's bedroom, where he accidentally starts a fire. In reaction to it, Matt and Chloe do not have sex. Jas is visited by a Russian exchange student, Staz. To Ollie's horror, he is handsome and fun. With Jas developing a crush on Staz, Ollie tries to prove he can be just as exciting a boyfriend as him. The three break into the college at night, where Ollie hits Staz with a chair, knocking him out.

=== Comic Relief Special (2009) ===
No.	Title	Directed by	Written by	Original release date
1	"When Janet Met Michelle"	Nick Wood	Tim Dawson & Susan Nickson	8 March 2009
Jas, Ollie, DK, Matt and Chloe attend Timothy Claypole's Comic Relief fun night of fun fundraiser at a local pub, where the events consist of a "bitch-off"; a "drink-off"; and a "flirt-off." However, events soon turn sour when the "bitch-off" discovers more than it bargained for, and the cardboard cutout of Jeremy Clarkson has a fright. Also includes the cast of Two Pints of Lager and a Packet of Crisps and Grownups.

=== Series 2 (2010) ===
No.	Title	Directed by	Written by	Original release date
1	"Rudies"	Nick Wood	Tim Dawson	12 January 2010
Chloe finally loses her virginity to Matt, who spreads the good news ... via Facebook, Myspace, Bebo and the school newsletter. Though he may have earned the admiration of the guys on campus, Chloe is horrified and demands that her virginity be restored, causing Matt to come up with some creative solutions. Meanwhile, DK, as ever, is rapping, this time with the help of Dinky DK – a pint-sized ventriloquist's doll he has made which behaves even worse than he does, causing the principal to quell a revolution amongst her college staff. Jas struggles to help Ollie overcome his fear of needles after an unfortunate accident and, as usual, havoc reigns across the lives of the five pupils of Wooton College.
2	"Who Killed Alec the Dwarf?"	Nick Wood	Tim Dawson	19 January 2010
As part of their general studies course, the principal has bought the college a local radio licence so the gang decides to do a radio play. Ollie discovers his creative streak as both playwright and director, being the self-proclaimed most talented person in the group. Following some less-than-spectacular auditions, Ollie succumbs to the temptations of the casting couch and gives Jas the lead role, much to Chloe's chagrin. There's an awe-inspiring homage to Murder She Wrote as the gang lurch into a disastrous performance of the radio play complete with long pauses, dodgy accents and the worst sound effects ever and things go from bad to worse when DK is let loose on the microphone.
3	"French Rs"	Nick Wood	Tim Dawson	26 January 2010
The arrival of the new French teacher, Mademoiselle Duquette, causes a stir and Ollie becomes obsessed by her, launching an all-out charm offensive to the exclusion of a chagrined Jas. Meanwhile, DK, on a mission to pay back the school fine he incurred for his radio show antics, embarks on a new career as a nude, life-drawing model. His debut is less than stellar and, against her better judgement, the principal allows him to make a second attempt, which proves little short of shambolic. Chloe and Matt try to spice up their sex life by experimenting with some slightly specialist techniques and props, and, perturbed by Ollie's overtures to Mademoiselle Duquette, Jas retaliates – with disastrous consequences.
4	"Black Eye"	Nick Wood	Tim Dawson	2 February 2010
In the wake of Jas's recent infidelity, the circle of those who know about it grows steadily wider, and DK's ability to keep it a secret grows steadily worse. Jas finds herself being blackmailed to continue relations with Horace in order to keep her indiscretion under wraps. DK, unable to keep a secret but also unwilling to see his friends break up, works with Chloe to devise a cunning plan. Ollie remains blissfully unaware of the situation and the friends work hard to keep it that way.
5	"Lederhosen Hero"	Nick Wood	Tim Dawson	9 February 2010
DK is plagued by dreams of the principal and becomes worried that she may have more than just a passing professional interest in him. Jas, meanwhile, sets out to rebuild her relationship with Ollie by finding a common interest away from sex. After being refused entry to the cinema for looking too young, Chloe and Matt concoct a variety of ludicrous strategies to get themselves in.
6	"Doreen"	Nick Wood	Tim Dawson	16 February 2010
Ollie is reeling from Jas's unplanned disclosure that she's been unfaithful to him. Meanwhile, the principal is determined to put DK to good work after his recent antics by sending him to do community service with the elderly. There, DK forms an unlikely alliance with Doreen and finds that appearances can be deceiving. Meanwhile, Jas and Ollie's feud is threatening to tear the group apart, so Matt and Chloe come up with a novel solution. And as DK's bond with Doreen grows, so does the amount of trouble he finds himself in. Guest-starring Miriam Margolyes as Doreen.
7	"Monster"	Nick Wood	Tim Dawson	23 February 2010
Ollie has chest pains which he thinks are the result of his split with Jas. The principal is replaced by the monstrous Captain Gannet. Chloe and DK hatch a plan to restore order to Wooton College. But things start to turn out for the worst as Ollie collapses to the floor with a suspected heart attack.
8	"Live or Die"	Nick Wood	Tim Dawson	2 March 2010
After they discover Ollie has had a heart attack, the gang gathers around his hospital bed to keep vigil. Ollie, meanwhile, finds himself in purgatory where his angel takes the form of a made-over DK, who presents him with a choice of whether to live or to die. The future looks bleak: Matt ends up with no hands, DK gives up rapping and takes up Gregorian chanting, Chloe cultivates a serious caffeine addiction and – most worrying of all – Jas turns to prostitution. Angel-DK, though, isn't all he purports to be and an intervention from a divine being who looks suspiciously like the principal presents a possible third way for Ollie to find his way back to his mates.

=== Series 3 (2011) ===
No.	Title	Directed by	Written by	Original release date
1	"Kissy Woo!"	Ed Bye	Tim Dawson	18 January 2011
Ollie and Jas are still separated, though not for long if Ollie has anything to do with it. Matt has made a new friend, Robyn Crisp, who he spends all his time with. However, Chloe is in for a shock when she finally meets them. How will the gang react when Matt introduces his new friend, Robyn Crisp, to them? Meanwhile, DK discovers he's a genius. This episode sees the debut of Minnie Crowe as new character Robyn Crisp.
2	"Badvert"	Ed Bye	Tim Dawson	25 January 2011
Enrolment at Wooten College is at an all-time low, so the principal decides to hold a competition for all the students to enter. They must all make an advert for the college, with a first place prize of 500 pounds. Ollie and Matt team up against Chloe and Jas, though their adverts reveal that they are not as different as they may think. DK and Robyn team up, forging a bond between the two of them. But the good times are about to be disrupted by a face from DK's past.
3	"My Idiot BF"	Ed Bye	Tim Dawson	1 February 2011
Ollie believes he may be the next big thing in the art world as he bares his bottom art, with the support of his muse, Jas. DK can't believe his luck with his dad Jim back in his life and things really starting to look up. Jim is a professional poker player and it looks like he may soon make enough to support DK and his mum. However, trouble may be afoot when he asks his trusting son for a favour. Meanwhile, Chloe starts tweeting about Matt’s idiotic behaviour, and Robyn thinks Chloe is giving Matt a harder time than he deserves.
4	"Robbery"	Ed Bye	Tim Dawson	8 February 2011
Having lost his mum's engagement ring, DK is distraught and tells the principal about everything that has happened. However, the gang are on hand to help DK get the ring back. Realising they could never raise the cash needed to buy it back, they plan to rob the local pawn shop, but they are going to need some unusual disguises. Jas and Ollie end up in jail, Matt and DK go into hiding and Robyn (who wasn't involved in the robbery as she was flying a kite) and Chloe go on the run.
5	"Dib Dib Dib"	Ed Bye	Tim Dawson	15 February 2011
After much reluctance the principal finally agrees to let Mr Palmer sign DK up to his scouting group for boys. Jas is excited as she launches her modelling career and Ollie is terrified he will lose her when she jets off around the world on glamorous assignments. However, his fears are put to rest when he spots her modelling in the local shopping centre. Tensions between Matt and Chloe come to the fore as the two have to seriously consider their future together.
6	"Penguin"	Ed Bye	Tim Dawson	22 February 2011
Following Matt and Chloe's break up, Chloe is at a loss while Matt finds himself caught up in a gang who love nothing more than 'gentle humour'. Ollie's foul-mouthed Aunty Olwen has come to stay with him, much to Jas's concern. Meanwhile, DK finds a pistol while litter-picking, and wonders what to use it for.
7	"Lesbian Jumper"	Ed Bye	Tim Dawson	1 March 2011
Love is in the air as Matt develops quite a penchant for older women. Can a romance with Vera, a 70-year-old cleaner, really last? Meanwhile, DK and Robyn are off to a lesbian bar in an attempt to get Robyn into the gay dating scene, though it seems DK is more popular with the ladies than he thought. Meanwhile, Ollie commits to using alcohol to forget his troubles.
8	"Fear Itself"	Ed Bye	Tim Dawson	8 March 2011
Ollie has finally committed to giving up alcohol, much to the amazement and delight of the rest of the gang. Inspired by his brave move to conquer his fear, the gang decide that they will all support him by overcoming one of their own fears. Jas will learn to be a proper actor, Matt will learn new words, Chloe will face her fear of ghosts, Robyn takes the first steps to facing her fear of dying a virgin and DK must befriend his old enemy Mr De Wilde.

== Reception ==
The show proved enormously popular with its target audience from the beginning, with Series 1 enjoying an average weekly reach of 1.2 million, and each episode appearing in the top 10 requested programmes on BBC iPlayer the day following transmission. Series 2 built on this success, with the first episode premiering to 719,000 viewers. BBC Three controller Danny Cohen (who commissioned the show) noted: "I'm delighted that Coming Of Age has been such a hit with young viewers. The writer Tim Dawson and the young cast are bright emerging stars for the BBC." Despite this, the show often receives a poor reaction from television critics. Writing about the first episode, The Daily Telegraph's Culture magazine was negative: "Crudeness abounds... but neither wit nor charm has tagged along for the ride." Harry Venning in The Stage stated that most of the show's humour "was unremittingly dire" and stated " I sat through Coming Of Age with the will to live seeping from my every pore, leaving me drenched in a puddle of despair. Apparently writer Tim Dawson was 19 when he wrote it, which is about six years older than I would have guessed." Meanwhile, The Scotsman said simply: "Coming of Age may be the worst BBC sitcom yet. It is supposedly aimed at teenagers, but I refuse to believe that even the easiest-to-please teenager is happy to accept something so horribly written, horribly acted and horribly vulgar in lieu of actual humour." However, some have been more willing to acknowledge the sitcom's appeal, with the British Comedy Guide conceding, "For its fans, it's a heightened reflection of their own experience of teenage years, with brilliantly absurd exchanges and sublime vulgarity to match."

== Home releases ==
Release name	UK release date (region 2)	Australian release date (region 4)	North American release date (region 1)	Notes
Series 1 Also includes "Pilot"	26 October 2009	N/A	N/A	Despite being filmed in HD no Blu-ray release.
Comic Relief Special	14 September 2009	N/A	N/A	Part of the Two Pints of Lager and a Packet of Crisps Eighth Series DVD release.
