= People Like Us (TV series) =

British reality documentary series

- Genre: Factual
- Narrated by: Natalie Casey
- Country of origin: United Kingdom
- Original language: English
- No. of series: 2
- No. of episodes: 10

Production
- Running time: 60 minutes
- Production company: Dragonfly Film and Television Productions

Original release
- Network: BBC Three
- Release: 6 February 2013 – 19 October 2014

People Like Us is a British reality documentary series broadcast on BBC Three. The programme tries to reflect the true lives of some of the residents of council estates in England, which according to the programme have continually ranked as the most deprived in the UK. The show has been criticised by Manchester residents, as well as the wider UK for showing a very stereotypical view of council estate residents.

The series mainly featured the areas of Harpurhey, Moston and Collyhurst. As a result of how the series depicted the areas, 'I love Harpurhey' banners were displayed by local residents to dispute the depiction of the broadcasters. Each episode lasts 60 minutes. The narrator of the programme is Natalie Casey.
