= Chopratown =

- Directed by: Sean Grundy
- Starring: Sanjeev Bhaskar; Natalie Casey; Omid Djalili; Manish Patel
- Country of origin: United Kingdom
- Original language: English

Production
- Running time: 60 minutes

Original release
- Network: BBC
- Release: 19 December 2005

Chopratown is a 2005 comedy drama from the BBC about private eye Vic Chopra (Sanjeev Bhaskar). In the film Chopra investigates Ali Ergun (Omid Djalili), a shady Turkish bakery owner. During his investigation he falls foul of Asian wide boy Ash Desai (Manish Patel) and added to this is the mystery of a missing cow.

Chopratown was directed by Sean Grundy, who also directed the first series of the Channel 4 drama Sugar Rush. The name "Chopratown" is a pun on the Jack Nicholson cult film Chinatown.

On release on 19 December 2005, the programme had 4.1 million viewers.
