= Lee Oakes =

English Retired actor

- Born: Lee Oakes; 1976 (age 49–50); Cheshire, England
- Occupation: Actor
- Years active: 1996–2011

Lee Oakes (born 1976) is an English retired actor best known for his role as Munch Wilkinson in Two Pints of Lager and a Packet of Crisps (2003-2008) and as Kev in After You've Gone (2007-2008).

Other credits include the films DragonHeart (1996), Daylight (1996), Club Le Monde (2002), Alien Autopsy (2006) and Harry Brown (2009); and appearances on the TV series The Lakes (1997-1999), Heartbeat (1998), Holby City (1999), The Bill (2000), 'Orrible (2001), Blue Murder (2003), Casualty (2007), Coronation Street (2009), and Emmerdale (2010).

== Life and career ==
Oakes (born 1976) was raised in Haslington, Cheshire, and was educated Sandbach School. Oakes attended the Gateway Youth Theatre, Chester. He pursued his theatrical career at the BBC, most notably in Once Upon a Time in Wigan, and Sparkleshark at the Royal National Theatre.

Oakes has appeared in The Lakes (1997-1999), DragonHeart (1996), Daylight (1996), Heartbeat (1998), Holby City (1999), The Bill (2000), 'Orrible (2001), Club Le Monde (2002), Blue Murder (2003), and Casualty (2007).

Oakes also played a supporting role in the 2006 film Alien Autopsy alongside Anthony McPartlin and Declan Donnelly.

He starred alongside Sheridan Smith and Will Mellor as Munch Wilkinson in 24 episodes of the British comedy Two Pints of Lager and a Packet of Crisps (2003-2008). He starred alongside Nicholas Lyndhurst in After You've Gone (2007-2008).

In 2009, appeared in Coronation Street (2009), and starred alongside Michael Caine playing Dean in the British crime thriller Harry Brown (2009).

In 2010, he starred as Mickey Hall in Emmerdale (2010), then in 2012, Oakes appeared in Hadouken!'s video "Parasite".

After retiring from acting he worked as MHE driver for Ceva logistics before moving onto agency work for Bentley.
