= Leah MacRae =

British actress

- Born: Leah MacRae; Belfast
- Occupations: Actress; writer
- Website: https://www.leahmacrae.com/

Leah MacRae is a Scottish actress and writer. She is best known for her roles in Rab C. Nesbitt, The Karen Dunbar Show, Gary Tank Commander, River City and Grownups. She is also known for starring in theatrical productions around Scotland and the rest of the UK, most notably at King's Theatre, Glasgow and Edinburgh Playhouse; starring in '51 Shades of Maggie'.

MacRae was born in Belfast but grew up in Southern England and Glasgow, where she currently resides.

As an actress, MacRae starred in River City as Ellie McLean from 2016 to 2022.

MacRae is also a writer of comedy; she wrote and performed her very own one woman show 'Leah MacRae: My Big Fat Fabulous Diary' which she toured around Scotland in 2019, every performance was sold out.

She followed this up in 2022 with her second one-woman comedy show, "Leah MacRae: Weighs In", which she debuted at the Edinburgh Fringe Festival, followed by a Scotland tour and two performances at the Soho Theatre, London.

In 2025 she guest-starred in three episodes of Gifted as the Shopkeeper.
