= Georgia Henshaw =

Welsh actress

- Born: 11 July 1993 (age 33); Swansea, Wales
- Occupation: Actress
- Years active: 2004–present

Georgia Henshaw (born 11 July 1993) is a Welsh actress best known for her roles on British television. Among her leading roles have been those of Rosie, a member of "The Ace Gang" in Angus, Thongs and Perfect Snogging, and as JJ's love interest, Lara, in Skins. She has also appeared as Cassie Claypole in the BBC Three show Two Pints of Lager and a Packet of Crisps. From 2011 to 2012, she starred in the BBC One school-based drama series Waterloo Road, as Madi Diamond.

== Filmography ==
Year	Title	Role	Notes
2004	Casualty	Gemma Terry	Episode: "Where There's Life..."
2005	The Giblet Boys	Rona Offal	Episode: "The Beast of Bogwash"
2007	Casualty	Suzie Cooper	Episode: "No End of Blame"
2007	The Bill	Lizzie Lucas	Episode: "Tortured Soul"
2008	Angus, Thongs and Perfect Snogging	Rosie	Movie
2008	The Children	Mary	
2009	The Bill	Annie	Episode: "Leap of Faith"
2009	Moving Wallpaper	Chloe	
2009	Blind Eye	Leanne	
2010	Skins	Lara Lloyd	Series 4, episode 6 : "JJ"
2010	Casualty	Maddy Devine	Episode: "Mum's the Word"
2010	Shelfstackers	Danielle	
2011	Being Human	Joy	Series 3, episode 2: "Adam's Family"
2011	EastEnders	Chloe	1 episode (Comic Relief 2011)
2011	Two Pints of Lager and a Packet of Crisps	Cassie Claypole	Series 9, 6 episodes
2011–2012	Waterloo Road	Madi Diamond	Series 7–8
2012	Casualty	Louise Hunter	Episode: "Happily Ever After"
2012	Pointless Celebrities	Herself	Series 2, episode 2 with ex co-star Ben-Ryan Davies
2012	Bedlam	Georgia	1 episode
2012	In the Dark Half	Michelle	
2013	The Crash	Rachel	2 episodes
2013	Trollied	Sophie	Series 3, episodes 8–10
2014	Holby City	Siobhan Quinn	Episode: "Anything You Can Do"
2014	Celebrity Mastermind	Herself	5 January
2015	Banana	Sian	Episode 3
2015	Casualty	Michaela Marsh	Episode: "One Shot"
2015	The Coroner	Amelia Prowse	Episode: "Gilt"
2019	I Am Kanye West	Sadie	Audio Drama
2020	Call the Midwife	Tina Atkins	Series 9, episode 2
