= Kathryn Drysdale =

British actress (born 1981)

- Born: 1 December 1981 (age 44); Wigan, Greater Manchester, England
- Education: Central School of Speech and Drama
- Occupation: Actress
- Years active: 1999–present

Kathryn Drysdale (born 1 December 1981) is an English actress. She gained prominence through her roles in the BBC sitcom Two Pints of Lager and a Packet of Crisps (2001–2009) and the films Vanity Fair (2004) and St Trinian's (2007). Her other work includes the drama Tripping Over (2006), the fourth series of Benidorm (2011) on ITV, the Channel 4 parody The Windsors (2018–2023), and as Genevieve Delacroix across 3 seasons of Netflix period drama Bridgerton (2020–).

On stage, her roles include Grace Shelley in The Ruling Class on the West End opposite James McAvoy, Hermia in A Midsummer Night's Dream, and Lady Katharine in Love's Labour's Lost opposite David Tennant and As Fran in The National Theatre’s production of Home I’m Darling

== Early life ==
Born to a black father and a white mother, Drysdale was adopted when she was a week old. She trained at the Central School of Speech and Drama.

== Career ==
From 2001 to 2009, Drysdale starred as Louise Brooks in the BBC sitcom Two Pints of Lager and a Packet of Crisps for eight out of nine series of the show. She made her film debut in Mira Nair's 2004 feature adaptation of William Thackeray's Vanity Fair as heiress Rhoda Swartz. In 2006, she played Lizzie in the British-Australian Channel 5 and Network Ten drama Tripping Over and Bliss in the Doctor Who series 2 episode "Love & Monsters". The following year, she played Taylor the Chav in the comedy film St Trinian's.

Also in 2006, Drysdale appeared in Catch at the Royal Court Theatre and in 2008 made her Royal Shakespeare Company debut in A Midsummer Night's Dream and Love's Labour's Lost. In 2009, she appeared in Suddenlossofdignity.com at the Bush Theatre and on tour.

Drysdale joined the main cast of the ITV sitcom Benidorm for its fourth series as Natalie Jones. She played Brownwell in an episode of William Boyd's four-part drama Any Human Heart on Channel 4. In 2012, Drysdale appeared in The Recruiting Officer at the Donmar Warehouse.

Drysdale played Meghan Markle in the second and third series of the Channel 4 parody series The Windsors. She is a prominent voice over artist having voiced many audiobooks, radio plays and lead characters in animation series series including Dennis the Menace for CBBC, thunderbirds

== Personal life ==
Drysdale lives in London.

== Filmography ==
=== Film ===
Year	Title	Role	Notes
2004	Vanity Fair	Rhoda Swartz	
2005	Zemanovaload	Travel Agent	
2007	St Trinian's	Taylor	
2013	One Chance	Stage Hand	
2015	I Am Urban	Madge	
2022	The Bubble	Minnie	
2022	Christmas On Mistletoe Farm	Miss Ashley	
2025	Grow	Polly Little	
TBA	The Mud Hut	Shirley	Pre-production

=== Television ===
Year	Title	Role	Notes
1999	People Like Us	Shoe Shop Assistant	Episode: "The Photographer"
2000	Trial & Retribution	Pregnant Girl	1 episode
2001–2009	Two Pints of Lager and a Packet of Crisps	Louise Brooks	70 episodes
2001	The Glass	Receptionist	1 episode
2001	Chambers	Fran James	Episode: "A Case with a View"
2001	Swivel on the Tip	Pippi Langstrumpf	
2002	The Vice	Elaine	Episode: "Trade"
2003	Rockface	Susie Travis	2 episodes
2003	Ultimate Force	Susannah	Episode: "What in the Name of God"
2003	Holby City	Gaby Burton	Episode: "Home"
2003	Doctors	Keeley Burton	Episode: "Nature's Way"
2003	Mersey Beat	Mel Turner	Episode: "Broken Dreams"
2004	From Bard to Verse	Brutus/Self	Episode 3
2006	Doctor Who	Bliss	Episode "Love & Monsters"
2006	Tripping Over	Lizzie	Miniseries
2007	Coming Up	Janine	Episode: "Brussels"
2009	Comedy Showcase	Various	Episode: "Girl Friday"
2010	Any Human Heart	Brownwell	1 episode
2011	Benidorm	Natalie Jones	Main role (series 4)
2013	The Psychopath Next Door	Imogen Tallis	Television film
2014	Death in Paradise	Simone Magon	Episode: "Ye of Little Faith"
2015	Suspects	Liz Maitlin	Episode: "The Artist"
2015	Horrible Histories	Cleopatra	Episode: "Crafty Cleopatra"
2015–2017	Bottersnikes and Gumbles	Bounce and Merri	Voice role; 18 episodes
2016	New Blood	Laura Jones	3 episodes
2016	Zapped	Lorelei	2 episodes
2017	Thunderbirds Are Go	Kate	Voice role; episode: "Grandma Tourismo"
2017–2020	The Windsors	Meghan Markle	Main role (series 2–3)
2017-2021	Dennis & Gnasher: Unleashed!	Jemima "JJ" Jones	Voice role; 17 episodes
2018	Chris P. Duck	Additional voices	Episode: "Parenthood"
2018	Plebs	Cleo	Episode: "The Bathhouse"
2018	The Queen and I	Trish Welling	Television film
2018	Sky Comedy Shorts	Trish	Episode: "Hands of Gods"
2020–present	Bridgerton	Genevieve Delacroix	Recurring role
2021–present	Circle Square	Dilys Dillydally / Gwen Dillydally / Mary Ruffle	21 episodes
2022	Lloyd of the Flies	Alison120 / Amy Fly / Dotty	Voice role; 4 episodes
2022–2023	Best & Bester	Bester	Main role; voice role
2025	Here We Go	Katie	Series 3, episode 7
2026	Small Prophets	Bea	TV series
2026	Ride or Die	Amanda	5 episodes
TBA	Relationships	Elizabeth Soames	TV movie; Post-production

=== Video games ===
Year	Title	Role	Notes
2012	The Nightvision Experiment	Davina	
2018	Forza Horizon 4	Taxi Passengers	
2019	Anthem	Captain Liatrelle, Lancer Easley, Gambling Woman	
2022	Horizon Forbidden West	Additional Voices	

=== Audio dramas ===
Year	Title	Role	Notes
2018	Alien: Out of the Shadows	Sneddon	
2020	Torchwood: The Sins of Captain John	Dr. Magpie / Maisie	2 episodes
2020	Doctor Who: The Tenth Doctor Adventures	Jora	Episode: "Out of Time 1"
2021	Doctor Who: Time Lord Victorious - Echoes of Extinction	Jasmine	
2021	Getting Better	Dr. Eva Callaway	10 episodes
2023	Nye Bevan's Fight to Create the NHS	Dr. Eva Callaway	
2025	The Wind in the Willows: A Weasel's Tale	Radar the bat	Radio 4 drama

== Stage ==
Year	Title	Role	Notes
1999	23:59	Zoe	Crucible Theatre, Sheffield
2000	Billy and the Crab Lady	Mel	Soho Theatre, London
2001	Eliza's House	Beth	Royal Exchange, Manchester
2004	Far Away	Joan	Crucible Theatre, Sheffield
2004	Fen	Various	Crucible Theatre, Sheffield
2006	Catch	Maya	Royal Court Theatre, London
2008	Love's Labour's Lost	Katherine / Moth	Courtyard Theatre, Stratford-upon-Avon
2008	Love's Labour's Lost	Katherine / Moth	Novello Theatre, London
2009	A Midsummer Night's Dream	Hermia	Novello Theatre, London
2009	Suddenlossofdignity.com	Various	Bush Theatre, London / tour
2012	The Recruiting Officer	Lucy	Donmar Warehouse
2013	A Mad World, My Masters	Mistress Hairbrain	RSC Studio
2015	The Ruling Class	Grace Shelley	Trafalgar Studios, London
2018	Home, I'm Darling	Fran	Theatr Clwyd
2018	Home, I'm Darling	Fran	Royal National Theatre

== Awards and nominations ==
Year	Award	Nomination	Work	Result	Ref.
2021	Screen Actors Guild Awards	Outstanding Performance by an Ensemble in a Drama Series	Bridgerton	Nominated	
