= Natalie Casey =

English actress

- Born: 15 April 1980 (age 46); Rawtenstall, Lancashire, England
- Occupations: Actress; presenter; narrator; singer
- Years active: 1984–present
- Relatives: Anna-Jane Casey (sister)

Natalie Laura Casey (born 15 April 1980) is a British actress, presenter, narrator and singer. She portrayed Carol Groves in the television show Hollyoaks (1996–2000, 2025) and Donna Henshaw in Two Pints of Lager and a Packet of Crisps (2001–2011).

== Early life ==
Casey was born on 15 April 1980 in Rawtenstall, Lancashire. Her older sister is the actress Anna-Jane Casey. She attended Oldham Theatre Workshop with her longtime friend Antony Cotton.

== Career ==
=== Music ===
In January 1984, when Casey was three years old, her rendition of the nursery rhyme "Chick Chick Chicken" reached No. 72 on the UK Singles Chart. This made her the youngest female artist to have had a solo hit in the UK Top 75 (with seven month old Jessica Smith appearing on the Teletubbies' number one hit in 1997, and Ian Doody in the Top 40 as Microbe aged 3 in 1969). In the same year, Casey appeared on the BBC's Saturday Superstore.

=== Television ===
In January 1996, Casey began playing Carol Groves on the Channel 4 soap opera Hollyoaks, in which she remained for over five years.

In 2001, she joined the cast of Two Pints of Lager and a Packet of Crisps, playing Donna Henshaw alongside her Hollyoaks co-star Will Mellor. Casey and Mellor were the only two original main characters to appear in all nine series. The final episode was broadcast on 24 May 2011.

Casey has also presented and narrated numerous shows such as Dinner Date from 2014. She appeared as a guest co-presenter of The Big Breakfast in January 2001 during Guest Presenter Week with Terri Dwyer. She co-presented Big Brother's Little Brother in 2001 with Dermot O'Leary.

=== Theatre ===
In summer 2007, Casey played Serena Katz in a hit run of the musical Fame at the Shaftesbury Theatre in London. In February 2008, she began playing the role Julia in the pre-West End UK tour of The Wedding Singer. Her other stage credits include The Vagina Monologues (Palace Theatre, Manchester), Hobson's Choice (Watermill Theatre opposite her sister Anna-Jane Casey), Flint Street Nativity (Liverpool Playhouse), Well at the Trafalgar Studios and the Apollo Theatre, opposite Sarah Miles and Ado Annie in Oklahoma! at the Chichester Festival Theatre. She took over from Denise van Outen in Legally Blonde at The Savoy Theatre as Paulette from 26 April 2011. In March 2012, she played Angela in the revival of Mike Leigh's Abigail's Party at the Menier Chocolate Factory, later transferring to Wyndham's Theatre, London.

On 29 June 2012, it was confirmed that Casey would play the role of Judy Bernly in the first UK tour production of the Broadway musical 9 to 5. The tour began at the Manchester Opera House on 12 October 2012. She appeared in the UK tour production of 9 to 5. She appeared in Sex and the Three Day Week from 2014 to 2015, Moving Stories in 2016 and 2017, Things I Know to Be True in 2016 and Stepping Out in 2017.

She will play Juliet in a reimagined version of Romeo and Juliet at the New Vic Theatre in Newcastle-under-Lyme during September and October 2026.

== Personal life ==
Casey lives in Greenwich, London.

== Filmography ==
Year	Film	Role
1990	Death in Venice	Young Girl
1996–2000, 2025	Hollyoaks	Carol Groves
1999	Brookside: Double Take	Moria
2000–2001	MTV Select	Presenter
2001	The Big Breakfast	Guest co-presenter with Terri Dwyer
2001	Big Brother's Little Brother	Co-presenter with Dermot O'Leary
2001–2011	Two Pints of Lager and a Packet of Crisps	Donna Henshaw
2002	24 Heaven	Presenter
2003	24 Access all areas	Presenter
2005	Chopratown	Annie Deaver
2009	Missing	Gemma Winter
2010	Changing Faces	Narrator
2013	People Like Us	Narrator
2014–2023	Dinner Date	Narrator
2016–2018	Spot Bots	Tangram
2022	Agatha Raisin	Maggie Tubby
2022	Cash in the Attic	Narrator
