= Susan Nickson =

English screenwriter, television producer and script editor

- Born: 1979 (age 46–47); Runcorn, Cheshire, England
- Occupations: Screenwriter; television producer; script editor
- Years active: 1994–present

Susan Nickson (born 1979) is an English screenwriter and executive producer.

== Early life ==
Nickson was raised in Runcorn, Cheshire, where she attended The Grange School.

== Career ==
Nickson began her career aged 14 when she won the Lloyds Bank Film Challenge with a ten-minute short film called Buddah's Legs. In 1995, her half-hour satirical comedy Life's a Bitch, starring Sean Hughes and Kathy Burke, aired on Channel 4.

Her first original sitcom, Two Pints of Lager and a Packet of Crisps, ran for ten years, across nine series, with Nickson writing the majority of the episodes. The series enjoyed enormous popular success, helping to launch the careers of its stars Sheridan Smith, Ralf Little and Will Mellor. It can still regularly be seen on BBC Three, and is currently available on BBC iPlayer.

Nickson also created the BBC Three sitcom Grownups, script-edited Coming of Age, and contributed episodes to series 11 and 12 of Birds of a Feather.

In 2022, her latest original series, Rosie Molloy Gives Up Everything, premiered on Sky Comedy.

== Personal life ==
Nickson is a patron of Cheshire Autism Practical Support (ChAPS), which helps families navigating autism, having grown up with an autistic brother.
