= Freddie Hogan =

British actor (born 1988)

- Born: 17 May 1988 (age 38)
- Occupation: Actor
- Years active: 2010–present

Freddie Hogan (born 17 May 1988) is a British actor, who became known to a wider audience in a leading role in the ninth series of the British sitcom Two Pints of Lager and a Packet of Crisps broadcast by BBC Three. Hogan also appears in a minor role in the second part of the movie Harry Potter and the Deathly Hallows. He was nominated for the 2011 Offie for "Best Actor" (Extra Virgin). Hogan is filming the new BBC1, 7-part series of Jonathan Strange & Mr Norell as Davey.

== Career ==
On moving to London Hogan's first role was with The National Youth Theatre in Cymbeline, playing Belarius. The following year he starred in the BBC sitcom Two Pints of Lager and a Packet of Crisps. He also appeared in Harry Potter and The Deathly Hallows part II as one of Harry Potter's house mates in Gryffindor. In the same year he returned to theatre to play Elliot in Extra Virgin and his debut nomination was for the 2011 Offie for "Best Actor". Hogan has appeared in the series Emmerdale.

Year	Title	Role	Type
2015	Fighting Heart	Luis Alexander	Film
2015	Jonathan Strange & Mr Norrell	Davey	TV
2014	Coronation Street	Sammy	TV
2013	Emmerdale	Gavin	TV
2013	The Love Not Taken	Cadogan Crawley	Short Film
2011	Harry Potter and the Deathly Hallows – Part 2	Terry Skeres	Film
2011	Two Pints of Lager and a Packet of Crisps	Billy McCormack	TV
2010	Playtimes Over	Clyde	Short Film

== Nominations ==
Year	Result	Award	Category/Recipient(s)
2011	Nominated	Offie	"Best Actor" (Extra Virgin)
