= Two Pints of Lager and a Packet of Crisps =

British television sitcom

- Genre: Sitcom
- Created by: Susan Nickson
- Written by: Susan Nickson (2001–2009), Karen Laws, Tim Dawson, Kate Wincup, Jon Brown, Robin Taylor and David Cantor.
- Directed by: Gareth Carrivick; Becky Martin; Nick Wood; Geoff Posner
- Starring: Sheridan Smith; Kathryn Drysdale; Ralf Little; Will Mellor; Natalie Casey; Luke Gell; Beverley Callard; Georgia Henshaw; Freddie Hogan
- Opening theme: "Two Pints of Lager Theme" by Christian Henson
- Country of origin: United Kingdom
- Original language: English
- No. of series: 9
- No. of episodes: 80 (list of episodes)

Production
- Production locations: Runcorn, Cheshire
- Camera setup: Multi-camera
- Running time: 30 minutes
- Production company: BBC Television

Original release
- Network: BBC Two (2001); BBC Choice (2002); BBC Three (2003–2011)
- Release: 26 February 2001 – 24 May 2011

Two Pints of Lager and a Packet of Crisps is a British television sitcom that ran from 26 February 2001 to 24 May 2011. First broadcast on BBC Two, it originally starred Sheridan Smith, Will Mellor, Natalie Casey, Ralf Little, Kathryn Drysdale and Beverley Callard. The show was created and written by Susan Nickson and set in her hometown of Runcorn, Cheshire, originally revolving around the lives of five twentysomethings. Little departed after the sixth series, and Smith and Drysdale left after the eighth series. The ninth and final series had major changes with new main cast members and new writers.

The core cast was augmented by various recurring characters throughout the series, portrayed by Beverley Callard, Lee Oakes, Hayley Bishop, Thomas Nelstrop, Freddie Hogan and Georgia Henshaw. The title was inspired by the 1980 song "Two Pints of Lager and a Packet of Crisps Please" by punk rock band Splodgenessabounds. On 23 July 2011, it was confirmed that the series would not return due to the BBC making room for new comedies and feeling that the series had come to a natural end after the departures of most of the main cast members.

== Production ==
BBC Two announced the first series as one of the highlights of their autumn 2000 schedule, although the premiere was eventually held back to 2001. The first six series with the original cast including Ralf Little ran until 2006, with Jonny killed off-screen during the first episode of the seventh series.

An eighth series was confirmed by Mellor in an interview in the Metro on 21 April 2008, in which he said that they would be filming the series from November 2008 to January 2009. In January 2009, the BBC announced recording dates for the next series at BBC Television Centre from 1 February to 3 April. Natalie Casey, Kathryn Drysdale, Luke Gell, Will Mellor and Sheridan Smith all returned and the new character of Wesley was played by Thomas Nelstrop.

The outcome of the final episode of series 8 was decided by the public, who were asked to vote on whether Gaz should be with Donna or Janet. Following the finale of series 8, which was broadcast on 10 May 2009, the audience chose Donna with 76.9% of the vote. The final episode concluded with Donna at Gaz's bedside.

Two special episodes were filmed in 2009. The first was set a few minutes after the ending of the previous episode, its cast being limited to Janet, Wesley and Tim, and was recorded on 13 August 2009 at BBC Television Centre. It was a musical extravaganza set entirely inside the Archer and was broadcast on 15 December 2009. The second, "Sliding Gaz", was recorded on 18 August 2009 and shown on 22 December 2009. The cast consists of Donna and Gaz only and shows Donna in a "sliding doors" technique, imagining Gaz being healthy and also paralysed.

In April 2010, it was revealed that the show was to return, albeit 'refreshed' by the BBC, after the departure of the creator of the show, Susan Nickson. Original cast members Smith and Drysdale were written out of the series after deciding not to return for series 9, and their departures were mentioned in the first episode of series 9. On 25 July 2011, the BBC announced that the show would not return for a tenth series.

== Episodes ==
Series
Series	Episodes	Originally released	
Series	Episodes	First released	Last released
1	6	26 February 2001	2 April 2001
2	6	15 April 2002	20 May 2002
3	10	23 February 2003	27 April 2003
4	8	15 February 2004	4 April 2004
5	14	4 January 2005	5 April 2005
6	10	26 February 2006	30 April 2006
7	8	13 January 2008	9 March 2008
8	8	15 March 2009	10 May 2009
9	6	26 April 2011	24 May 2011

== Cast ==
=== Main ===
Actor	Character	Duration	Episodes
Will Mellor	Gaz Wilkinson	2001–2011	79
Natalie Casey	Donna Wilkinson née Henshaw	2001–2011	78
Sheridan Smith	Janet Keogh née Smith	2001–2009	73
Kathryn Drysdale	Louise Brooks	2001–2009	70
Ralf Little	Jonny Keogh	2001–2006	56
Luke Gell	Tim Claypole	2008–2011	23
Georgia Henshaw	Cassie Claypole	2011	6
Freddie Hogan	Billy McCormack	2011	6

=== Supporting ===
Actor	Character	Duration	Episodes
Beverley Callard	Flo Henshaw	2001–2003	19
Oliver Boot	Andy	2002–2003	3
Jonathon Dutton	David Fish	2003–2004	12
Lee Oakes	Munch Wilkinson	2003–2005, 2008	24
Alison Mac	Kate	2004	6
Hayley Bishop	Kelly Crabtree	2004–2006	26
Thomas Nelstrop	Wesley Presley	2009	7
Samuel Barnett	Leonard	2011	2

== Home releases ==
Series	Date released	# of episodes	# of discs	Special features
The Complete First and Second Series	18 August 2003	12	2	
The Complete Third and Fourth Series	6 September 2004	18	4	2003 Musical special
The Complete Fifth Series	5 September 2005	14	2	
The Complete Series 1–4	24 October 2005	30	6	
The Complete Sixth Series	4 September 2006	10	2	Behind the scenes
The Complete Series 1–6	16 October 2006	54	10	
The Complete Seventh Series	21 April 2008	8	2	Behind the scenes
The Complete Eighth Series	14 September 2009	9	2	Comic Relief Special
The Complete Ninth Series	13 June 2011	6	2	2009 specials
The Complete Collection	8 September 2025	80	16	All Special features from all Nine Series DVD releases
