= List of Waterloo Road episodes =

Waterloo Road is a British television drama series set in a comprehensive school of the same name, first broadcast on BBC One on 9 March 2006, and concluding its original run on 9 March 2015.

In September 2021, the show was recommissioned, with production returning to the Greater Manchester area.

The show's original run aired entirely on BBC One during a peak time slot, with the exception of the second half of the tenth series which aired on BBC Three.

Since the show's revival, all episodes have aired entirely on BBC One, and each series is released as a boxset on BBC iPlayer ahead of television broadcast.

== Transmissions ==
The show is set in a failing comprehensive school of the same name and focuses on both the professional and personal lives of the students and staff. The show was initially filmed on a former primary school site in Kirkholt, Rochdale, before moving production to a former secondary school site in Greenock, Scotland for series eight to ten. The revival series returned to Greater Manchester, with filming at the former St Ambrose Barlow Roman Catholic High School in Swinton.

=== Original show ===
The show ran for ten series with 200 hour-long episodes in its initial run. The first series contained eight episodes, which was increased to twelve for the second series. The third series saw an increase to twenty episodes, which continued until series seven when the show increased its output to thirty episodes.

The show's move to Scotland established a commitment to making fifty episodes of the drama, which aired over series eight and nine. A further twenty episodes were then commissioned as part of the show's tenth series.

The majority of the drama was first broadcast on BBC One in a primetime 8pm timeslot, originally on Thursdays before later moving to Wednesdays. However, the final ten episodes of the show were premiered on BBC Three in an 8.30 pm timeslot, with a repeat airing later that day, at 10.35 pm, on BBC One. The decision was made to allow new programming to air in the timeslot.

Waterloo Road was cancelled in 2014 after BBC executives decided it had reached "the end of its lifecycle". The show's initial run ended at the conclusion of its tenth series in March 2015.

=== Waterloo Road Reunited ===
A short online spin-off series, Waterloo Road Reunited, was commissioned in 2010 and ran for six episodes the following year. It focuses on the lives of six school leavers who previously appeared in the main show.

=== Return ===
In September 2021, a new series was announced as part of the BBC's intentions to represent all areas of Britain in its programming.

On 6 December 2022, the BBC confirmed that the new series would premiere on 3 January 2023, replacing Holby City in the Tuesday 8pm timeslot, following the show's cancellation in June 2021. It was confirmed that the first seven episodes from the series would release on BBC iPlayer as a boxset on the same day.

== Series overview ==
Series	Episodes	Originally released		Average viewership (in millions)
Series	Episodes	First released	Last released	Average viewership (in millions)
1	8	9 March 2006	27 April 2006	4.55
2	12	18 January 2007	26 April 2007	4.00 (Note: Two ratings are unknown due to them being outside of the top 30 ratings for their respective week.)
3	20	11 October 2007	13 March 2008	5.00
4	20	7 January 2009	20 May 2009	3.81 (Note: Four ratings are unknown due to them being outside of the top 30 ratings for their respective week.)
5	20	28 October 2009	15 July 2010	4.28 (Note: Three ratings are unknown due to them being outside of the top 30 ratings for their respective week.)
6	20	1 September 2010	6 April 2011	5.13
7	30	4 May 2011	25 April 2012	5.30
8	30	23 August 2012	4 July 2013	1.57 (Note: Nineteen ratings are unknown due to them being outside of the top 30 ratings for their respective week.)
9	20	5 September 2013	12 March 2014	Unknown (Note: All ratings are unknown due to them being outside of the top 30 ratings for their respective week.)
10	20	15 October 2014	9 March 2015	0.36 (Note: Ten ratings are unknown due to them being outside of the top 30 ratings for their respective week.)
11	7	3 January 2023	14 February 2023	TBA
12	7	16 May 2023	27 June 2023	TBA
13	8	2 January 2024	26 February 2024	TBA
14	8	10 September 2024	29 October 2024	TBA
15	8	11 February 2025	1 April 2025	TBA
16	8	23 September 2025	14 October 2025	TBA
17	8	6 January 2026	27 January 2026	TBA

== Episodes ==
=== Series 1 (2006) ===
No.	Title	Directed by	Written by	Original release date	UK viewers (million)
1	"Episode 1"	Barnaby Southcombe	Ann McManus & Maureen Chadwick	9 March 2006	5.03
2	"Episode 2"	Barnaby Southcombe	Ann McManus & Maureen Chadwick	16 March 2006	4.56
3	"Episode 3"	Julie Edwards	Ann McManus & Maureen Chadwick	23 March 2006	4.47
4	"Episode 4"	Julie Edwards	Ann McManus & Maureen Chadwick	30 March 2006	4.59
5	"Episode 5"	Ian Bevitt	Steve Griffiths	6 April 2006	4.86
6	"Episode 6"	Ian Bevitt	Harry Wootliff	13 April 2006	4.07
7	"Episode 7"	Jim Loach	Shaun Duggan	20 April 2006	4.33
8	"Episode 8"	Jim Loach	Ann McManus & Maureen Chadwick	27 April 2006	4.47

=== Series 2 (2007) ===
No.	Title	Directed by	Written by	Original release date	UK viewers (million)
9	"Episode 1"	Barnaby Southcombe	Ann McManus & Maureen Chadwick	18 January 2007	4.93
10	"Episode 2"	Barnaby Southcombe	Ann McManus & Maureen Chadwick	25 January 2007	N/A (<4.66) (Note: Not reported in the weekly top 30 programmes for BBC One.)
11	"Episode 3"	Jim Loach	Harriet Warner	1 February 2007	N/A (<4.38)
12	"Episode 4"	Jim Loach	Ann McManus & Maureen Chadwick	8 February 2007	4.77
13	"Episode 5"	Farren Blackburn	Harriet Warner	15 February 2007	4.45
14	"Episode 6"	Farren Blackburn	Phil Ford	22 February 2007	4.64
15	"Episode 7"	Mike Cocker	Ann McManus & Maureen Chadwick	1 March 2007	4.64
16	"Episode 8"	Mike Cocker	Harriet Warner	29 March 2007	4.76
17	"Episode 9"	David Innes Edwards	Ann McManus & Anne Marie O'Connor	5 April 2007	4.85
18	"Episode 10"	David Innes Edwards	Harriet Warner	12 April 2007	5.09
19	"Episode 11"	Lance Kneeshaw	Phil Ford	19 April 2007	4.77
20	"Episode 12"	Lance Kneeshaw	Harriet Warner	26 April 2007	5.06

=== Series 3 (2007–2008) ===
No.	Title	Directed by	Written by	Original release date	UK viewers (million)
Autumn Term
21	"Episode 1"	Marc Jobst	Harriet Warner	11 October 2007	5.00
22	"Episode 2"	Marc Jobst	Lisa Holdsworth	18 October 2007	4.70
23	"Episode 3"	Dermot Boyd	David McManus & Annie Bruce & James Simpson	25 October 2007	4.39
24	"Episode 4"	Dermot Boyd	Matthew Evans	1 November 2007	5.11
25	"Episode 5"	Luke Watson	Fleur Costello	8 November 2007	5.08
26	"Episode 6"	Luke Watson	David McManus	15 November 2007	4.89
27	"Episode 7"	Martin Hutchings	David McManus	22 November 2007	5.04
28	"Episode 8"	Marc Jobst	Lisa Holdsworth	29 November 2007	4.61
29	"Episode 9"	Laurence Moody	Ann McManus & Sharon Oakes	6 December 2007	4.84
30	"Episode 10"	Laurence Moody	Liz Lake	13 December 2007	4.87
Spring Term
31	"Episode 11"	Jenny Ash	Lisa Holdsworth	10 January 2008	5.46
32	"Episode 12"	Jenny Ash	Danny McCahon	17 January 2008	4.95
33	"Episode 13"	Mike Adams	Nick Hoare	24 January 2008	4.85
34	"Episode 14"	Mike Adams	Doug Watson	31 January 2008	4.93
35	"Episode 15"	Julie Edwards	Michael Jenner	7 February 2008	5.08
36	"Episode 16"	Julie Edwards	David McManus	14 February 2008	5.46
37	"Episode 17"	Laurence Moody	Gert Thomas	21 February 2008	4.85
38	"Episode 18"	Laurence Moody	Fleur Costello	28 February 2008	5.14
39	"Episode 19"	Unknown	Danny McCahon	6 March 2008	5.24
40	"Episode 20"	Unknown	Lisa Holdsworth	13 March 2008	5.47

=== Series 4 (2009) ===
No.	Title	Directed by	Written by	Original release date	UK viewers (million)
Autumn Term
41	"Episode 1"	Minkie Spiro	Lisa Holdsworth	7 January 2009	4.69
42	"Episode 2"	Minkie Spiro	David McManus	14 January 2009	4.85
43	"Episode 3"	James Erskine	David McManus	21 January 2009	N/A (<4.65)
44	"Episode 4"	James Erskine	Phillip Dodds	28 January 2009	N/A (<4.78)
45	"Episode 5"	Dominic Keavey	Ann McManus & Avril Russell	4 February 2009	N/A (<5.16)
46	"Episode 6"	Dominic Keavey	Louise Ironside	11 February 2009	4.85
47	"Episode 7"	Matthew Evans	Phillip Dodds & Karen McLachlan	18 February 2009	N/A (<4.58)
48	"Episode 8"	Matthew Evans	Nick Hoare	25 February 2009	4.85
49	"Episode 9"	Jonathan Fox Bassett	Michael Jenner	4 March 2009	4.81
50	"Episode 10"	Jonathan Fox Bassett	David McManus	11 March 2009	4.44
Spring Term
51	"Episode 11"	Tim Hopewell	Lisa Holdsworth	18 March 2009	4.92
52	"Episode 12"	Tim Hopewell	Nazrin Choudhry	25 March 2009	4.95
53	"Episode 13"	Jon Sen	Marc Pye	1 April 2009	4.86
54	"Episode 14"	Jon Sen	Phillip Dodds	8 April 2009	4.51
55	"Episode 15"	James Erskine	David McManus	15 April 2009	4.60
56	"Episode 16"	James Erskine	Nick Hoare	22 April 2009	4.93
57	"Episode 17"	Julie Edwards	Louise Ironside	29 April 2009	4.62
58	"Episode 18"	Julie Edwards	Michael Jenner	6 May 2009	4.76
59	"Episode 19"	Keith Boak	David McManus	13 May 2009	4.54
60	"Episode 20"	Keith Boak	Lisa Holdsworth	20 May 2009	4.94

=== Series 5 (2009–2010) ===
No.	Title	Directed by	Written by	Original release date	UK viewers (million)
Autumn Term
61	"Episode 1"	Matthew Evans	Ann McManus	28 October 2009	5.06
62	"Episode 2"	Matthew Evans	Maureen Chadwick	4 November 2009	5.97
63	"Episode 3"	Tim Hopewell	Nick Hoare	11 November 2009	5.78
64	"Episode 4"	Tim Hopewell	David McManus	18 November 2009	5.10
65	"Episode 5"	Fraser MacDonald	Phillip Dodds	25 November 2009	5.40
66	"Episode 6"	Fraser MacDonald	Louise Ironside	2 December 2009	4.54
67	"Episode 7"	Jill Robertson	Liz Lake	9 December 2009	5.21
68	"Episode 8"	Jill Robertson	Katie Douglas	16 December 2009	N/A (<4.66)
69	"Episode 9"	Jonathan Fox Bassett	Linton Chiswick	23 December 2009	N/A (<5.57)
70	"Episode 10"	Jonathan Fox Bassett	Paul Logue	30 December 2009	5.30
Spring Term
71	"Episode 11"	Matthew Evans	Ann McManus	7 April 2010	5.13
72	"Episode 12"	Matthew Evans	David McManus	14 April 2010	4.90
73	"Episode 13"	Tim Hopewell	Sasha Hails	21 April 2010	5.13
74	"Episode 14"	Tim Hopewell	Lisa Holdsworth	28 April 2010	5.33
75	"Episode 15"	Joss Agnew	Phillip Dodds	5 May 2010	5.31
76	"Episode 16"	Joss Agnew	Alison Greenaway	26 May 2010	4.49
77	"Episode 17"	Jon Sen	Katie Douglas	2 June 2010	3.55
78	"Episode 18"	Jon Sen	Liz Lake	9 June 2010	N/A (<4.02)
79	"Episode 19"	Matthew Evans	Alison Greenaway	14 July 2010	4.84
80	"Episode 20"	Matthew Evans	Nick Hoare	15 July 2010	4.47

=== Series 6 (2010–2011) ===
No.	Title	Directed by	Written by	Original release date	UK viewers (million)
Autumn Term
81	"Episode 1"	Fraser MacDonald	Lisa Holdsworth	1 September 2010	5.53
82	"Episode 2"	Fraser MacDonald	Louise Ironside	2 September 2010	4.42
83	"Episode 3"	Roger Goldby	Liz Lake	8 September 2010	4.66
84	"Episode 4"	Roger Goldby	Philip Dodds	15 September 2010	5.16
85	"Episode 5"	Julie Edwards	Katie Douglas	22 September 2010	4.82
86	"Episode 6"	Julie Edwards	Paul Logue	29 September 2010	4.98
87	"Episode 7"	Joss Agnew	Ellen Taylor	6 October 2010	4.87
88	"Episode 8"	Joss Agnew	Ryan Craig	13 October 2010	4.89
89	"Episode 9"	Dermot Boyd	Neil Jones	20 October 2010	5.11
90	"Episode 10"	Dermot Boyd	Nick Hoare	27 October 2010	4.48
Spring Term
91	"Episode 11"	Jill Robertson	Ann McManus & Eileen Gallagher	2 February 2011	5.54
92	"Episode 12"	Jill Robertson	Ann McManus & Eileen Gallagher	9 February 2011	5.44
93	"Episode 13"	Fraser MacDonald	Carol Ann Docherty & Aileen Goss	16 February 2011	5.29
94	"Episode 14"	Fraser MacDonald	Paul Logue	23 February 2011	5.16
95	"Episode 15"	Robert Knights	Nick Hoare	2 March 2011	5.53
96	"Episode 16"	Robert Knights	Ellen Taylor	9 March 2011	5.54
97	"Episode 17"	Jon Sen	Ryan Craig	16 March 2011	5.67
98	"Episode 18"	Jon Sen	Liz Lake	23 March 2011	5.27
99	"Episode 19"	Julie Edwards	Georgia Pritchett	30 March 2011	5.21
100	"Episode 20"	Julie Edwards	Philip Dodds	6 April 2011	5.02

=== Series 7 (2011–2012) ===
No.	Title	Directed by	Written by	Original release date	UK viewers (million)
Autumn Term
101	"Episode 1"	Andrew Gunn	Philip Dodds	4 May 2011	5.67
102	"Episode 2"	Andrew Gunn	Liz Lake	11 May 2011	6.01
103	"Episode 3"	Jill Robertson	Katie Douglas	18 May 2011	5.87
104	"Episode 4"	Jill Robertson	Chris Murray	25 May 2011	6.12
105	"Episode 5"	Julie Edwards	Carol Ann Docherty & Aileen Goss	1 June 2011	4.59
106	"Episode 6"	Julie Edwards	Liz Lake	8 June 2011	6.20
107	"Episode 7"	Joss Agnew	Julie Dixon	15 June 2011	5.96
108	"Episode 8"	Joss Agnew	Davey Jones	22 June 2011	5.88
109	"Episode 9"	Brian Kelly	David McManus	29 June 2011	5.92
110	"Episode 10"	Brian Kelly	Nick Hoare	6 July 2011	6.04
Spring Term
111	"Episode 11"	Andrew Gunn	Davey Jones	14 September 2011	5.35
112	"Episode 12"	Andrew Gunn	Ann McManus & Eileen Gallagher	21 September 2011	4.24
113	"Episode 13"	Julie Edwards	Jake Riddell	28 September 2011	5.02
114	"Episode 14"	Julie Edwards	David McManus	5 October 2011	4.50
115	"Episode 15"	Reza Moardi	Jess Williams	12 October 2011	4.60
116	"Episode 16"	Reza Moardi	Ben Ockrent	19 October 2011	5.31
117	"Episode 17"	Alex Kalymnios	Chris Murray	26 October 2011	4.49
118	"Episode 18"	Alex Kalymnios	Philip Gawthorne	2 November 2011	5.56
119	"Episode 19"	Fraser MacDonald	Muirinn Lane Kelly	9 November 2011	5.41
120	"Episode 20"	Fraser MacDonald	Nick Hoare	16 November 2011	4.88
Summer Term
121	"Episode 21"	Jonathan Fox Bassett	Jake Riddell	22 February 2012	5.50
122	"Episode 22"	Jonathan Fox Bassett	Davey Jones	29 February 2012	4.77
123	"Episode 23"	Daikin Marsh	Simon J Ashford	7 March 2012	5.18
124	"Episode 24"	Daikin Marsh	Sally Tatchell	14 March 2012	4.92
125	"Episode 25"	Steve Hughes	Matthew Evans	21 March 2012	5.21
126	"Episode 26"	Steve Hughes	Alanna Hallum	28 March 2012	4.97
127	"Episode 27"	Paul Murphy	Chris Murray	4 April 2012	5.08
128	"Episode 28"	Paul Murphy	Chris Bucknall	11 April 2012	5.03
129	"Episode 29"	Dermot Boyd	Davey Jones	18 April 2012	5.25
130	"Episode 30"	Dermot Boyd	Jake Riddell	25 April 2012	5.46

=== Series 8 (2012–2013) ===
No.	Title	Directed by	Written by	Original release date	UK viewers (million)
Autumn Term
131	"New Beginnings"	Paul Murphy	Ann McManus & Eileen Gallagher	23 August 2012	4.44
132	"Spirit Child"	Paul Murphy	Paul Logue	30 August 2012	4.05
133	"Troubled Waters"	Diakin Marsh	Jake Riddell	6 September 2012	4.47
134	"Read My Lips"	Diakin Marsh	Jake Riddell	13 September 2012	4.35
135	"Future Proof"	Paul Cotter	Sally Tatchell	20 September 2012	4.16
136	"We Need to Talk about Cheryl"	Paul Cotter	Gabbie Asher	27 September 2012	4.31
137	"A Woman Scorned"	Fraser MacDonald	Chris Murray	4 October 2012	N/A (<4.31)
138	"The Price of Love"	Fraser MacDonald	David McManus	11 October 2012	N/A (<4.23)
139	"Skin Deep"	Roberto Bangura	Chris Bucknall	18 October 2012	4.26
140	"Paradise Lost"	Roberto Bangura	Liz Lake	25 October 2012	N/A (<4.30)
Spring Term
141	"Bad Boy"	Steve Brett	Viv Adam	3 January 2013	N/A (<4.84)
142	"Whole Lotto Trouble"	Steve Brett	Paul Mousley	10 January 2013	N/A (<4.65)
143	"A Woman's Worth"	Fiona Walton	Graham Mitchell	17 January 2013	N/A (<5.10)
144	"Sins of the Father"	Fiona Walton	Paul Farrell	24 January 2013	N/A (<4.89)
145	"Mr Chalk's Waterloo"	Nigel Douglas	Chris Murray	31 January 2013	N/A (<4.69)
146	"Sanctuary"	Nigel Douglas	Davey Jones	7 February 2013	N/A (<4.78)
147	"Baby Be Mine"	Jamie Annett	Philip Dodds	14 February 2013	N/A (<4.69)
148	"Man of The Match"	Jamie Annett	Katie Douglas	21 February 2013	4.38
149	"Spartacus"	David Holroyd	David McManus	28 February 2013	N/A (<4.21)
150	"Paradise Found"	David Holroyd	Liz Lake	7 March 2013	4.75
Summer Term
151	"Nowhere To Run"	Daniel Wilson	Viv Adam	2 May 2013	4.16
152	"Princess of Spices"	Daniel Wilson	Keith Brumpton	9 May 2013	N/A (<3.80)
153	"Grandmaster"	Craig Pickles	Kim Millar	16 May 2013	N/A (<3.87)
154	"Tan-Tastic"	Craig Pickles	Liz Lake	23 May 2013	N/A (<3.75)
155	"Love Hurts"	Patrick Harkins	David McManus	29 May 2013	3.64
156	"Revenge"	Patrick Harkins	Paul Mousley	6 June 2013	N/A (<3.11)
157	"Sugar Mummy"	Roberto Bangura	Paul Logue	13 June 2013	N/A (<3.59)
158	"Journey's End"	Roberto Bangura	Stephen McAteer	20 June 2013	N/A (<3.78)
159	"Dirty Laundry"	Roberto Bangura	Liz Lake	26 June 2013	N/A (<3.50)
160	"Hero"	Dermot Boyd	Paul Farrell	4 July 2013	N/A (<3.91)

=== Series 9 (2013–2014) ===
No.	Title	Directed by	Written by	Original release date	UK viewers (million)
Autumn Term
161	"Beyond the Call of Duty"	Patrick Harkins	Liz Lake	5 September 2013	N/A (<4.01)
162	"Sue Spark's Bad Day"	Patrick Harkins	Jaden Clark	12 September 2013	N/A (<3.76)
163	"The Madness of King Windsor"	Roberto Bangura	Paul Mousley	19 September 2013	N/A (<3.61)
164	"Text Rated"	Roberto Bangura	Karen Laws	26 September 2013	N/A (<3.86)
165	"Crossing the Line"	David Innes Edwards	Paul Farrel	3 October 2013	N/A (<3.84)
166	"Grantly's Perfect Poetry"	David Innes Edwards	David McManus	10 October 2013	N/A (<3.78)
167	"Lies Mothers Tell"	Craig Pickles	Kelly Jones	17 October 2013	N/A (<3.97)
168	"Don't Mention the War"	Craig Pickles	Keith Brumpton	24 October 2013	N/A (<4.07)
169	"Father Figure"	Jamie Annett	Viv Adam	31 October 2013	N/A (<3.94)
170	"Happy Ever After"	Jamie Annett	Chris Murray	7 November 2013	N/A (<3.94)
Spring Term
171	"Bad Girl"	Audrey Cooke	Wendy Granditer	8 January 2014	N/A (<4.60)
172	"Sugar Daddy"	Audrey Cooke	Lauren Klee	15 January 2014	N/A (<4.40)
173	"Girls Just Wanna Have Fun"	Fiona Walton	Matthew Barry	22 January 2014	N/A (<4.29)
174	"Suspicious Minds"	Fiona Walton	Cat Jones	29 January 2014	N/A (<4.48)
175	"Out of Bounds"	Richard Platt	Ann Marie Di Mambro	5 February 2014	N/A (<4.60)
176	"A Bolt from the Blue"	Richard Platt	David McManus	12 February 2014	N/A (<4.72)
177	"Nowhere to Run"	Alex Kalymnios	Ann McManus & Diane Burrows	19 February 2014	N/A (<4.55)
178	"Dynasty's Choice"	Alex Kalymnios	Karen Laws	26 February 2014	N/A (<4.71)
179	"End of the Road"	Patrick Harkins	Cat Jones	5 March 2014	N/A (<4.52)
180	"New Highs, New Lows"	Patrick Harkins	Alexander Lamb	12 March 2014	N/A (<4.40)

=== Series 10 (2014–2015) ===
No.	Title	Directed by	Written by	Original release date	UK viewers (million)
Autumn Term
181	"Episode 1"	Roberto Bangura	Ann McManus & Eileen Gallagher	15 October 2014	N/A (<4.03)
182	"Episode 2"	Roberto Bangura	Dare Aiyegbayo & Ann McManus	22 October 2014	N/A (<4.23)
183	"Episode 3"	Simon Massey	Diane Burrows	29 October 2014	N/A (<3.90)
184	"Episode 4"	Simon Massey	Ann McManus & Diane Burrows	5 November 2014	N/A (<3.90)
185	"Episode 5"	David Innes Edwards	David McManus	12 November 2014	N/A (<3.98)
186	"Episode 6"	David Innes Edwards	Karen Laws	19 November 2014	N/A (<4.06)
187	"Episode 7"	Sarah Walker	Ann McManus & Eileen Gallagher	26 November 2014	N/A (<3.91)
188	"Episode 8"	Sarah Walker	Lauren Klee	3 December 2014	N/A (<3.74)
189	"Episode 9"	Jamie Annett	Kelly Jones	10 December 2014	N/A (<4.11)
190	"Episode 10"	Jamie Annett	Wendy Granditer	17 December 2014	N/A (<4.00)
Spring Term
191	"Episode 11"	Brian Grant	Chris Murray	5 January 2015	0.89
192	"Episode 12"	Brian Grant	Di Burrows	12 January 2015	0.76
193	"Episode 13"	Morag Fullarton	Katie Douglas	19 January 2015	0.69
194	"Episode 14"	Morag Fullarton	Karen Laws	26 January 2015	0.60
195	"Episode 15"	Patrick Harkins	Paul Farrell	2 February 2015	0.69
196	"Episode 16"	Patrick Harkins	Chris Bucknall	9 February 2015	0.74
197	"Episode 17"	Lee Haven Jones	Sally Tatchell	16 February 2015	0.62
198	"Episode 18"	Lee Haven Jones	David Bowker	23 February 2015	0.70
199	"Episode 19"	Steve Hughes	Chris Murray	2 March 2015	0.77
200	"Episode 20"	Steve Hughes	Chris Murray	9 March 2015	0.71

=== Series 11 (2023) ===
No. overall	No. in series	Episode	Directed by	Written by	Original release date	UK viewers (millions)
201	1	Episode 1	Jesse Quiñones	Liz Lake	3 January 2023	N/A (<3.34) (Note: Not reported in the weekly top 50 programmes.)
202	2	Episode 2	Jesse Quiñones	Neil Jones	10 January 2023	N/A (<2.95)
203	3	Episode 3	Paulette Randall	Lisa Holdsworth	18 January 2023	N/A (<2.96)
204	4	Episode 4	Paulette Randall	Kellie Smith	24 January 2023	N/A (<2.95)
205	5	Episode 5	Amanda Mealing	Paul Mousley	31 January 2023	N/A (<2.90)
206	6	Episode 6	Makalla McPherson	Kat Rose-Martin	7 February 2023	N/A (<2.94)
207	7	Episode 7	Makalla McPherson	Neil Jones	14 February 2023	N/A (<2.89)

=== Series 12 (2023) ===
No. in series	Title	Directed by	Written by	Original release date	UK viewers (millions)
208	Episode 1	Jesse Quiñones	Neil Jones	16 May 2023	N/A (<2.39)
209	Episode 2	Amanda Mealing	Jayshree Patel	23 May 2023	N/A (<2.32)
210	Episode 3	Jesse Quiñones	Davey Jones	30 May 2023	N/A (<2.48)
211	Episode 4	Piotr Szkopiak	Kat Rose-Martin	6 June 2023	N/A (<2.38)
212	Episode 5	Piotr Szkopiak	Kellie Smith	13 June 2023	N/A (<2.25)
213	Episode 6	Mustapha Kseibati & Piotr Szkopiak	Neil Jones	20 June 2023	N/A (<2.30)
214	Episode 7	Mustapha Kseibati	Paul Mousley	27 June 2023	N/A (<2.37)

=== Series 13 (2024) ===
No. in series	Title	Directed by	Written by	Original release date	UK viewers (millions)
215	Episode 1	Vicky Thomas	Davey Jones	2 January 2024	N/A
216	Episode 2	Vicky Thomas	Jayshree Patel	9 January 2024	N/A
217	Episode 3	Angela Griffin	Natalie Mitchell	23 January 2024	N/A
218	Episode 4	Angela Griffin	Jayshree Patel & Jessica Barnes	30 January 2024	N/A
219	Episode 5	Mickey Jones	Gareth McLean	7 February 2024	N/A
220	Episode 6	Mickey Jones	Julia Kent	13 February 2024	N/A
221	Episode 7	Paulette Randall	Rebekah Harrison	20 February 2024	N/A
222	Episode 8	Paulette Randall	Neil Jones	26 February 2024	N/A

=== Series 14 (2024) ===
No. in series	Title	Directed by	Written by	Original release date	UK viewers (millions)
223	Episode 1	Robin Sheppard	Kellie Smith	10 September 2024	N/A
224	Episode 2	Robin Sheppard	Neil Jones	17 September 2024	N/A
225	Episode 3	Piotr Szkopiak	Jayshree Patel	24 September 2024	N/A
226	Episode 4	Piotr Szkopiak	Natalie Mitchell	1 October 2024	N/A
227	Episode 5	John Maidens	Charlie Swinbourne	8 October 2024	N/A
228	Episode 6	John Maidens	Paul Mousley	15 October 2024	N/A
229	Episode 7	Angela Griffin	Andrea Dewsbery & Liz Lewin	22 October 2024	N/A
230	Episode 8	Angela Griffin	Katie Douglas	29 October 2024	N/A

=== Series 15 (2025) ===
No. in series	Title	Directed by	Written by	Original release date	UK viewers (millions)
231	Episode 1	Jesse Quinones	Kellie Smith	11 February 2025	N/A
232	Episode 2	Jesse Quinones	Kat Rose-Martin	18 February 2025	N/A
233	Episode 3	Khurrum M Sultan	Caroline Mitchell	25 February 2025	N/A
234	Episode 4	Khurrum M Sultan	Jayshree Patel	4 March 2025	N/A
235	Episode 5	Amy Coop	Julia Kent	11 March 2025	N/A
236	Episode 6	Amy Coop	Natalie Mitchell	18 March 2025	N/A
237	Episode 7	Thomas Hescott	Baby Isako	25 March 2025	N/A
238	Episode 8	Thomas Hescott	Davey Jones	1 April 2025	N/A

=== Series 16 (2025) ===
No. in series	Title	Directed by	Written by	Original release date	UK viewers (millions)
239	Episode 1	Lloyd Eyre-Morgan	Chris Gill	23 September 2025	N/A
240	Episode 2	Lloyd Eyre-Morgan	Lisa Holdsworth	23 September 2025	N/A
241	Episode 3	Ruth Carney	Andrea Dewsbury & Liz Lewin	30 September 2025	N/A
242	Episode 4	Ruth Carney	Yasmeen Khan	30 September 2025	N/A
243	Episode 5	Jesse Quinones	Daniel Rusteau	7 October 2025	N/A
244	Episode 6	Angela Griffin	Paul Mousley	7 October 2025	N/A
245	Episode 7	Michael Lacey	Caroline Mitchell	14 October 2025	N/A
246	Episode 8	Michael Lacey	Neil Jones & Adam Simpson	14 October 2025	N/A

=== Series 17 (2026) ===
No. in series	Title	Directed by	Written by	Original release date	UK viewers (millions)
247	Episode 1	Lloyd Eyre-Morgan	Katie Douglas	6 January 2026	N/A
248	Episode 2	Lloyd Eyre-Morgan	Jessica Barnes	6 January 2026	N/A
249	Episode 3	Christiana Ebohon-Green	Tom Wentworth	13 January 2026	N/A
250	Episode 4	Christiana Ebohon-Green	Davey Jones & Eve Steele	13 January 2026	N/A
251	Episode 5	Claire Tailyour	Kellie Smith	20 January 2026	N/A
252	Episode 6	Claire Tailyour	Julia Kent	20 January 2026	N/A
253	Episode 7	John Maidens	Neil Jones	27 January 2026	N/A
254	Episode 8	John Maidens	Jayshree Patel	27 January 2026	N/A

== Specials ==
=== Waterloo Road Reunited ===
No.	Title	Directed by	Written by	Original release date
1	"The Reunion"	Stewart Svaasand	Laura Klimke	2 March 2011
2	"The Gig"	Stewart Svaasand	Chris Willshaw	9 March 2011
3	"Stags and Hens"	Stewart Svaasand	Lissa Tognini	16 March 2011
4	"The Wedding"	Stewart Svaasand	Stuart Hill	23 March 2011
5	"A Quiet Night In"	Stewart Svaasand	Stuart Hill	30 March 2011
6	"Bon Voyage"	Stewart Svaasand	Chris Willshaw	6 April 2011
