= Waterloo Road series 8 =

Waterloo Road
- Series 8
- DVD cover
- Starring: Alec Newman; Laurie Brett; Jason Done; Georgie Glen; Daniela Denby-Ashe; Melanie Hill; Philip Martin Brown; Victoria Bush; Mark Benton; Heather Peace; Jaye Jacobs; Richie Campbell; Chelsee Healey; Daniela Nardini; Angus Deayton; Richard Mylan
- No. of episodes: 30

Release
- Original network: BBC One
- Original release: 23 August 2012 – 4 July 2013

Series chronology
- ← Previous; Series 7 Next → Series 9

The eighth series of the British television drama series, Waterloo Road, began broadcasting on 23 August 2012, and ended on 4 July 2013 on BBC One. It consisted of thirty episodes. The series follows the lives of the faculty and Students of the eponymous school. While a comprehensive school in all other series, Waterloo Road is a privately funded independent school for the majority of the eighth series. Production also relocated to Greenock, Scotland beginning with this series. This series shows the final appearance of Tom Clarkson (Jason Done).

== Plot ==
The show follows the lives of the teachers and the Students at the eponymous school of Waterloo Road, a failing inner-city comprehensive, tackling a wide range of issues often seen as taboo such as alcoholism, pyromania, teenage pregnancy, fostering, exorcism, coercive control, freeganism, adoption, pole-dancing, rape, burn injury, terminal illness, workplace bullying, self-harming, deafness, activism, blackmail, gender identity disorder, euthanasia, alcoholic hepatitis, assault, kidney failure, kidney donation and post-traumatic stress disorder.

== Cast and characters ==
=== Staff ===
- Alec Newman as Michael Byrne; Headteacher (28 episodes)
- Laurie Brett as Christine Mulgrew; Head of English and Acting Headteacher (30 episodes)
- Jason Done as Tom Clarkson; Deputy Headteacher and English teacher (30 episodes)
- Georgie Glen as Audrey McFall; Head of History (29 episodes)
- Daniela Denby-Ashe as Lorraine Donnegan; School benefactor (27 episodes)
- Melanie Hill as Maggie Budgen; Home Economics teacher, Senior Canteen Assistant and Housemistress (27 episodes)
- Philip Martin Brown as Grantly Budgen; English teacher and Housemaster (24 episodes)
- Victoria Bush as Sonya Donnegan; School secretary (22 episodes)
- Mark Benton as Daniel "Chalky" Chalk; Head of Mathematics (20 episodes)
- Heather Peace as Nikki Boston; Deputy Headteacher and Head of the Student Referral Unit (20 episodes)
- Jaye Jacobs as Sian Diamond; Deputy Headteacher and Head of Science (19 episodes)
- Richie Campbell as Ndale Kayuni; School handyman (7 episodes)
- Chelsee Healey as Janeece Bryant; School secretary (6 episodes)
- Daniela Nardini as Esther Fairclough; Acting Head of Science (4 episodes)
- Angus Deayton as George Windsor; Head of Modern Foreign Languages (3 episodes)
- Richard Mylan as Simon Lowsley; Deputy Headteacher and English teacher (2 episodes)

=== Students ===
- Shane O'Meara as Connor Mulgrew (30 episodes)
- Kirstie Steele as Imogen Stewart (30 episodes)
- Kane Tomlinson-Weaver as Harley Taylor (30 episodes)
- Rebecca Craven as Rhiannon Salt (28 episodes)
- Marlene Madenge as Lula Tsibi (26 episodes)
- Tommy Lawrence Knight as Kevin Chalk (23 episodes)
- Carl Au as Barry Barry (20 episodes)
- Brogan Ellis as Kacey Barry (20 episodes)
- Abby Mavers as Dynasty Barry (20 episodes)
- Katie McGlynn as Jodie "Scout" Allen (20 episodes)
- Adiza Shardow as Liberty Gordon (20 episodes)
- Taylor Rhys as Jack McAllister (19 episodes)
- Paige Meade as Jade Fleming (18 episodes)
- Kaya Moore as Phoenix Taylor (12 episodes)
- Naveed Choudhry as Tariq Siddiqui (8 episodes)
- Benjamin Gur as Angus "Gus" Hancock (8 episodes)
- William Rush as Josh Stevenson (7 episodes)
- Georgia Henshaw as Madi Diamond (6 episodes)

=== Others ===
==== Recurring ====
- Zöe Lucker as Carol Barry; Mother of the Barry children (8 episodes)
- Ron Donachie as Billy Byrne; Michael's terminally ill father (7 episodes)
- Alex Norton as Gerard Findlay; Headteacher of Havelock High (5 episodes)
- Jody Latham as Steve-O Malone; Dynasty's boyfriend (4 episodes)
- Jenny Ryan as Sally Stewart; Imogen's mother (3 episodes)
- Alisa Anderson as Zoe Foster; Student (2 episodes)
- Leyla Ogulyaymis as Cheryl Bryant; Janeece's young daughter (2 episodes)
- Lisa Riley as Tina Allen; Scout's mother (2 episodes)
- Shaun Prendergast as Robert Bain; Director of the Department for Education (2 episodes)

==== Guest ====
- Mhairi Anderson as Morag Murray; Student (1 episode)
- Fraser Ayres as Duncan Kilty; Owner of a pole-dancing bar (1 episode)
- Patrick Baladi as Julian Noble; Television presenter for Noble Thoughts (1 episode)
- James Daffern as Ray Keats; Head of Lorraine's call centre and careers advisor (1 episode)
- James Doherty as Martin Johnson; School governor (1 episode)
- Nicola Duffett as Daisy Skelton; Kevin's estranged mother (1 episode)
- Niall Greig Fulton as Kai Murray; Morag and Ewan's father (1 episode)
- Jan Goodman as Maureen Donnegan; Lorraine and Sonya's mother (1 episode)
- Clare Grogan as Sandra Gordon; Liberty's mother (1 episode)
- Bill Fellows as Trevor Croft; Maggie's husband (1 episode)
- Max Fowler as Drew Kelly; Jade's abusive boyfriend (1 episode)
- Gaynor Howe as Sarah Winters; Adoptive mother of Jade's unborn baby (1 episode)
- Emmanuel Ighodaro as Kaz Winters; Adoptive father of Jade's unborn baby (1 episode)
- Raji James as Usman Haq; Owner of Prince of Spices fast food (1 episode)
- Cornell S John as Lionel Tsibi; Lula's uncle (1 episode)
- Daniel Kerr as Ewan Murray; Student (1 episode)
- Pollyanna McIntosh as Olivia McAllister; Jack's mother (1 episode)
- Anna-Maria Nabirye as Cecile Tsibi; Lula's mother (1 episode)
- Tachia Newall as Bolton Smilie; Ex-Student and Army officer (1 episode)
- Derek Riddell as Joe Mulgrew; Christine's ex-husband (1 episode)
- George Sampson as Kyle Stack; Student (1 episode)
- Sam Lucas Smith as Fergal Doherty; Student (1 episode)
- John Kay Steel as Dr. Fielding Granger; Grantly's consultant (1 episode)
- Elizabeth Tan as Princess Windsor; George's wife (1 episode)
- Vishal Thakur as Nasir Haq; Student (1 episode)
- John Thomson as Nelson Smith; Phoenix and Harley's father (1 episode)
- Josie Walker as Theresa Doherty; Fergal's mother (1 episode)

== Episodes ==
No.	Title	Directed by	Written by	Original release date	UK viewers (million)
Autumn Term
131	"New Beginnings"	Paul Murphy	Ann McManus & Eileen Gallagher	23 August 2012	4.44
As the new Waterloo Road opens its doors in Scotland for the first time, the staff and students from Rochdale are still reeling from the accident that killed Denzil Kelly and left Tariq in a wheelchair. Meanwhile, a troubled young couple arrive at Waterloo Road, appealing to Lorraine's good nature for a chance to make a good future for themselves. However, Tom is concerned by their relationship and it is not long before tensions arise. New teachers Christine Mulgrew and Audrey McFall make themselves known to the original staff, but it soon becomes clear that Christine has a problem with alcohol. Note: First appearance of Audrey McFall, Christine and Connor Mulgrew, Rhiannon Salt, Imogen Stewart, Jade Flemming, Lula Tisbi, Angus "Gus" Hancock, and Gerard Findlay.
132	"Spirit Child"	Paul Murphy	Paul Logue	30 August 2012	4.05
Lula Tsibi's issues come to a head at Denzil's memorial service, and Tom faces a race against time to stop her overbearing uncle from performing an exorcism on her. Connor's desperation to end Christine's alcoholism leads him to try and shame her in front of the whole class, but his plan backfires. However, he finds an unlikely ally in Imogen. Grantly's car is vandalised by Havelock High students. Josh tries to reach out to Tariq, who is feeling down about being in a wheelchair. Note: Madi Diamond Returns
133	"Troubled Waters"	Diakin Marsh	Jake Riddell	6 September 2012	4.47
Feeling depressed about his situation, Tariq makes a drastic decision; he is going to end it all. When Tom and Michael discover his plans, they face a race against time to stop him before it's too late. Gerard Findlay makes a surprising ally within Waterloo Road's ranks, and humiliates Michael in front of the whole school, leading Lorraine and Sian to ask questions.
134	"Read My Lips"	Diakin Marsh	Jake Riddell	13 September 2012	4.35
It's Imogen's birthday, and she is upset when her attention-seeking mother Sally helps out with a new fitness regime at the school. She catches the eye with the male students, and embarrasses Imogen when she flirts with cocky student Gus. Later, feeling protected by Connor, Imogen reveals a long-held secret. Havelock's headteacher Gerard makes false accusations against Michael, while Sian reaches out to Michael's father Billy. Note: First appearance of Billy Byrne.
135	"Future Proof"	Paul Cotter	Sally Tatchell	20 September 2012	4.16
The feud between Michael and Havelock's headteacher Gerard comes to a dramatic head after Gerard's star student, Liberty, turns to Waterloo Road. Chalky is shocked when Janeece fails to notice that Cheryl has chicken pox, and questions her capabilities as a mother. Connor snubs his mother, believing she is faking illness, but when Christine collapses down the stairs, it becomes clear not all is as it seems. Note: First appearance of Liberty Gordan. Final Appearance of Gerard Findlay.
136	"We Need to Talk about Cheryl"	Paul Cotter	Gabbie Asher	27 September 2012	4.31
At the end of his tether with Janeece, Chalky drops her in it with social services. Threatened with losing Cheryl, Janeece makes a big decision about her future at Waterloo Road. Rhiannon continues to bully Scout, and Maggie falls under Rhiannon's spell, much to Scout's despair. Christine learns that she has alcoholic hepatitis, and if she carries on drinking it will kill her. Determined to stop for Connor, she later experiences alarming withdrawal symptoms, witnessed by her entire class. Sian tries to make Michael go and see Billy. Note: Final Appearance of Janeece Bryant (until Series 11).
137	"A Woman Scorned"	Fraser MacDonald	Chris Murray	4 October 2012	N/A (<4.31) (Note: Not reported in the weekly top 30 programmes for BBC One.)
It's Maggie and Grantly's wedding day, but she surprises everyone by calling the whole thing off. However, Scout is suspicious and soon realises the reason Maggie cancelled the wedding is because she is being threatened by her estranged husband, Trevor. Sian and Madi both set their sights on the same guy. Josh persuades Tom to let him leave Waterloo Road and spread his wings. Note: Final appearance of Josh Stevenson (until episode 24).
138	"The Price of Love"	Fraser MacDonald	David McManus	11 October 2012	N/A (<4.23)
Lorraine's competition to design a bench leads to tension between quiet student Morag and her over-protective father. Connor tries to help Christine out, but makes more problems when he gives everyone top marks on their English papers and Audrey gets suspicious. Sian is shocked when Madi reveals her plans to leave Waterloo Road and Greenock, while Billy asks Michael to help him end his life. Note: First appearance of Kevin Skelton. Final Appearance of Madi Diamond, and Angus "Gus" Hancock. First episode Maggie Croft is known as Maggie Budgen.
139	"Skin Deep"	Roberto Bangura	Chris Bucknall	18 October 2012	4.26
Scout realises Rhiannon is self-harming when Audrey's attempt to help the troubled student backfires. Can they bury the hatchet to get Rhiannon help? Christine and Audrey's feud comes to a head as they agree to attend meditation together. New boy Kevin pulls out the stops to prove himself to Connor, earning him the disapproval of Michael and Lorraine. Lorraine gets her sister, Sonya, a job at Waterloo Road, while Sian discovers Billy's plan. Note: First appearance of Sonya Donnegan.
140	"Paradise Lost"	Roberto Bangura	Liz Lake	25 October 2012	N/A (<4.30)
The pressure is getting to Connor as Christine is drinking heavier than ever, and he plans to run away with Imogen. However, when Christine gets wind of what is going on, she puts her foot down and her manipulation of her son has devastating consequences for Imogen. Michael is devastated when Billy asks him to help him end his life, but can Michael go through with it? Lorraine comes up with a simple but blunt plan to iron out bad results, putting Phoenix and other students' future at Waterloo Road in jeopardy. Note: Final Appearance of Billy Byrne and Tariq Siddiqui (until Series 9).
Spring Term
141	"Bad Boy"	Steve Brett	Viv Adam	3 January 2013	N/A (<4.84)
The Barry family descend on Waterloo Road, the family consisting of con artist Barry Barry, gossipy Dynasty Barry, and football mad Kacey Barry. They are led by the fierce matriarch Carol, who makes it clear to Michael that she wants Greenock to be a new start for her family. However, it's not long before Barry's back to his old schemes and a fight breaks out between him and Jack MacAllister as he is sleeping with Jack's mum. Nikki Boston returns to Waterloo Road to head up the new PRU, and instantly locks horns with Scout. Imogen blames Christine for the fire at the end of last term. Note: First appearance of Barry, Carol, Dynasty and Kacey Barry, and Jack McAllister. Nikki Boston returns.
142	"Whole Lotto Trouble"	Steve Brett	Paul Mousley	10 January 2013	N/A (<4.65)
Phoenix and Harley can't believe their luck when they win big on the lottery. At the same time, their dad returns, making Phoenix very suspicious about his intentions. Is he after their cash? Barry uses Nikki and Scout's feud to his advantage, and takes Nikki's car and handbag. Connor returns to school, but cannot bear to look Imogen in the eye as he is really guilty about causing her scars. A lonely Michael confides in Christine as his impending court case takes a strange turn. Chalky tries to win Kevin's trust. Note: Final appearance of Phoenix Taylor and Nelson Smith.
143	"A Woman's Worth"	Fiona Walton	Graham Mitchell	17 January 2013	N/A (<5.10)
Dynasty reconsiders her plans to become a pole dancer when she learns Imogen can do nothing about her scars from the fire. However, when she reveals her change of mind to her mother, Carol hits the roof. Michael asks Christine out on a date, while Nikki is furious when her car is stolen; and she instantly blames Scout. Chalky tries to understand Kevin.
144	"Sins of the Father"	Fiona Walton	Paul Farrell	24 January 2013	N/A (<4.89)
Christine is stunned when her ex-husband Joe arrives at Waterloo Road, and hides his presence from Connor. However, when Connor discovers just who Joe is and Christine's relationship with Michael hits the rocks, she looks for solace in the form of a bottle of vodka. Nikki realises she is bullying Scout after she works out Barry is behind stealing her car. Sian looks for a way to tackle the Barry family's disruptive behaviour. Connor reveals the truth about the fire to a stunned Imogen.
145	"Mr Chalk's Waterloo"	Nigel Douglas	Chris Murray	31 January 2013	N/A (<4.69)
Chalky and Kevin prepare for a visit from the social worker, but Kevin's hopes for a happy future seem to be dashed when he finds out some dirt on Chalky's past. Sian attempts to deal with the Barrys through 'divide and conquer', but when Barry works out what she is up to he spikes Sonya's baking with marijuana. Still reeling from Connor's confession, Imogen begs him to tell the truth.
146	"Sanctuary"	Nigel Douglas	Davey Jones	7 February 2013	N/A (<4.78)
Ex-Waterloo Road student Bolton Smilie returns to see Tom, but there is more behind his return than meets the eye. When the police come calling, a desperate Bolton takes Grantly and the PRU students hostage. Connor returns to school following confessing to arson, and struggles as part of the PRU. Furious at his return, Dynasty, Kacey and Lula plot revenge. Lorraine announces she wants to close the PRU. Note: Return and final appearance of Bolton Smilie.
147	"Baby Be Mine"	Jamie Annett	Philip Dodds	14 February 2013	N/A (<4.69)
Jade's plans to give away her unborn child are rocked when Maggie and Scout discover them. They beg her to reconsider, but her determination to do so is increased when she hears that the baby's father, Drew, isn't coming out of prison for a long while yet. Connor is shaken when he discovers a pregnancy test in the bin, and confronts Imogen; but when she denies all knowledge of it, he realises it must belong to Christine. Sian is worried that Barry will ruin the PRU presentation.
148	"Man of The Match"	Jamie Annett	Katie Douglas	21 February 2013	4.38
When Michael discovers Tom has put Kacey on the boys football team, he realises he is breaking the rules and smashes Kacey's dreams. This acts as a catalyst as a distraught Kacey desperately reveals she is a boy, and her family are all rocked by this news. Connor and Imogen grow closer when he gives her a ring. Michael and Christine's relationship issues come to a head; it's make or break time.
149	"Spartacus"	David Holroyd	David McManus	28 February 2013	N/A (<4.21)
As the Barry clan continue to refuse to accept Kacey's identity issues, the whole situation gets too much for Sian and Barry winds her up until she snaps, slapping Barry in front of her class. Faced with the collapse of her career, Michael has to do all in his power to help his friend. Connor defies Christine after she discovers his engagement ring, and proposes to Imogen they get married sooner rather than later. Chalky and Kevin's game is head hunted by Lorraine. Note: Final appearance of Sian Diamond.
150	"Paradise Found"	David Holroyd	Liz Lake	7 March 2013	4.75
Just as things look up for Scout, she is rocked by the arrival of her mother Tina. Tina says she wants a new start with her daughter, but Scout is unwilling to believe her, telling Tom that she has fallen for her mother's tricks too many times. However, when Tina's health takes a turn for the worse, Scout is left devastated and her whole future is in jeopardy. Grantly is rushed to hospital after collapsing, and given some shattering news, while Chalky accepts a business offer away from Greenock, but leaves Kevin behind. Note: Final appearance of Jodie 'Scout' Allen and Jade Fleming and Daniel 'Chalky' Chalk (until Series 9). First Episode Kevin Skelton is known as Kevin Chalk.
Summer Term
151	"Nowhere To Run"	Daniel Wilson	Viv Adam	2 May 2013	4.16
Newcomer Fergal and his mother Teresa try to escape an impossible situation, and Harley and Nikki are caught up in the middle of their dramas. Grantly and Maggie try to come to terms with his diagnosis, and he is determined to keep it secret from the school; but when Maggie is told she cannot be a donor, she makes a desperate plea to the staff to help their long-term colleague. Lorraine announces that large budget cuts are the only way she can afford to keep Waterloo Road open. Note: First appearance of Ndale Kayuni.
152	"Princess of Spices"	Daniel Wilson	Keith Brumpton	9 May 2013	N/A (<3.80)
Rhiannon goes dramatically off the rails when Maggie interferes in her love life, and it takes a few words from Grantly to make her realise the error of her ways. Later, at the schoolhouse, tragedy strikes as Grantly is taken seriously ill to hospital... Connor is upset to learn that he's not allowed Imogen over now he and Christine have moved in with Michael, and agrees to buy a car off Barry so they have a place to be together. Sonya spots an opportunity in Audrey's friend Ndale.
153	"Grandmaster"	Craig Pickles	Kim Millar	16 May 2013	N/A (<3.87)
Dynasty is reunited with her ex-boyfriend, Steve-O, who has just been released from prison. Although he tries to tell her he's changed, he is soon part of Barry's dodgy jobs and threatens Kevin when he notices a spark between him and Dynasty. With pressure from Lorraine's funding difficulties building, Michael announces the cuts they are making to the school, leaving Audrey's future at the school in jeopardy. Note: First appearance of Steve-O.
154	"Tan-Tastic"	Craig Pickles	Liz Lake	23 May 2013	N/A (<3.75)
Sonya is shaken when her ill mother mistakes her for Lorraine, and her bad day continues when Rhiannon has a bad reaction to her tanning products and Ndale ends their affair. Lorraine calls time on her relationship with Nikki when Michael discovers the truth, leading to a breakdown in communication. Steve-O continues to be a menacing presence in Greenock, while Josh returns to Waterloo Road and is stunned by Tom's plan to donate his kidney to Grantly. Note: Final appearance of Josh Stevenson.
155	"Love Hurts"	Patrick Harkins	David McManus	29 May 2013	3.64
Dynasty and Kevin are shocked as Steve-O breaks into their flat and threatens them both. Connor is also having trouble with Steve-O when he takes over the loan payments for his car; and later takes drastic action to show that he is serious about his threats if Connor defaults payments. Christine pulls out all the stops and manages to get the job at Havelock, but Michael, not wishing to lose his partner and colleague, gives her an offer that she cannot refuse instead. Lula makes an alliance with new teacher Esther Fairclough over their hatred of animal testing. Note: First appearance of Esther Fairclough.
156	"Revenge"	Patrick Harkins	Paul Mousley	6 June 2013	N/A (<3.11)
Kevin is devastated to learn that Steve-O raped Dynasty. His emotions clouding his judgement, Kevin hatches a plan to get Steve-O out of his life for good by killing him. When Lorraine announces she wishes to turn Waterloo Road into a fee-paying school, Michael is disgusted and promptly hands in his resignation. Sonya finds herself acting as Audrey's wedding planner, and later becomes her bridesmaid, much to Ndale's concern. Note: Final appearance of Steve-O.
157	"Sugar Mummy"	Roberto Bangura	Paul Logue	13 June 2013	N/A (<3.59)
Sonya, unable to cope with her guilt any longer, admits her affair with Ndale to a devastated Audrey, who decides to go ahead with the wedding anyway. However, another bombshell leaves the day in tatters. Nikki takes over as head, but struggles when a load of the staff strike, and despite Lorraine's best attempts, quits at the end of the day. Michael schemes to get Waterloo Road to become a Local Authority school. Note: First appearance of George Windsor and Robert Bain. Final appearance of Ndale Kayuni.
158	"Journey's End"	Roberto Bangura	Stephen McAteer	20 June 2013	N/A (<3.78)
Although Michael is headteacher once again, he still has not told Lorraine about his plans to turn Waterloo Road into a Local Authority school. When she does find out, she hits the roof, announcing plans to turn the school into 'the Lorraine Donnegan Institute of Excellence' and threatening to kick the schoolhouse kids out. After a failed attempt at persuading Lorraine, Michael decides to leave Greenock for London; and Christine is devastated by the news he doesn't want her to come with him. Also, Lula's vendetta against Nox Pharmaceuticals steps up, leaving Esther and Tom terrified of her capabilities. Before Michael and Lorraine both leave, Lorraine announces that she will continue to fund the boarding house. Note: Final appearance of Michael Byrne, Lorraine Donnegan and Esther Fairclough.
159	"Dirty Laundry"	Roberto Bangura	Liz Lake	26 June 2013	N/A (<3.50)
As Christine's first day as headmistress of Waterloo Road begins, Carol Barry hatches a scheme to show Kevin up on national TV; and invites his mother along for the ride. Sally Stewart arrives at the school, and goes on the warpath after Christine lets slip Imogen and Connor are still together; and, just as Christine and Nikki put their differences behind them, new deputy head Simon Lowsley arrives and reveals he is taking over Nikki's role. Maggie is told that they are facing having to take Grantly off the ventilator, but when they do they are stunned as he continues to breathe – on his own. Note: First appearance of Simon Lowsley and Princess Windsor.
160	"Hero"	Dermot Boyd	Paul Farrell	4 July 2013	N/A (<3.91)
Having woken up from his coma, Grantly shocks everyone, especially Maggie, by refusing to accept the offer of Tom's healthy kidney. Tom has more problems however when ex-pupil Kyle Stack returns to Waterloo Road, but is he really after the new start he says he's after? Simon manages to prove his worth, but things are tense between him and Tom. And as the fireworks to celebrate Grantly's charity auction take to the sky, things take a dark turn for a Waterloo Road favourite. Note: Final appearance of Tom Clarkson, Liberty Gordan and Jack McAllister. Return and final appearance of Kyle Stack

== DVD release ==
The Autumn Term (episodes 1–10) was released on 4 February 2013. The Spring Term (episodes 11–20) was released on 3 June 2013. The Summer Term (episodes 21–30) was released on 7 October 2013. The Complete Series Eight was released on 15 September 2014.
