= Barry Barry =

Fictional character in BBC TV drama Waterloo Road

- Waterloo Road character
- Carl Au as Barry Barry
- First appearance: "Bad Boy"; 3 January 2013
- Last appearance: "Dynasty's Choice"; 26 February 2014
- Portrayed by: Carl Au

In-universe information
- Occupation: Student; Career criminal
- Family: Carol Barry (mother); Neil Barry (father); Dynasty Barry (sister); Kacey Barry (sister)
- Significant others: Olivia MacAllister; Rhiannon Salt; Gabriella Wark

Barry Barry is a fictional character from the BBC school-based drama series Waterloo Road, played by Carl Au. He first appears in the eleventh episode of the eighth series, entitled "Bad Boy", broadcast on 3 January 2013. The character is introduced as part of the Liverpudlian criminal Barry family, with his mother Carol Barry (Zöe Lucker), and sisters Dynasty Barry (Abby Mavers) and Kacey Barry (Brogan Ellis). Barry is characterised as a villain who is unfocused and troublesome, but also has a complex personality. The absence of Barry's father has impacted his personality and created a dislike for authority. Au extensively researched troublesome children with absent fathers for his portrayal of the character.

Barry's mischievous personality is a recurring theme throughout his storylines. Following his arrival, Barry establishes a feud with Jack MacAllister (Taylor Rhys) after it is revealed that Barry is dating Jack's mother, Olivia MacAllister (Pollyanna McIntosh). The character is also developed through his interactions with other characters, including a vendetta against deputy headteacher Sian Diamond (Jaye Jacobs) which concludes when Sian slaps Barry, a romantic relationship with Gabriella Wark (Naomi Battrick), and the breakdown of his relationship with Kacey after she struggles with her gender identity. Barry is also used to highlight the topic of sexting after he shares explicit images of Rhiannon Salt (Rebecca Craven).

When almost £10,000 is raised towards a boxing scholarship for Kacey, Barry steals the money, but is exposed as the thief, resulting in his exile from the Barry family. Following a short absence, Barry returns for a handful of episodes leading to Au's departure from the series. Barry departs in the ninth series episode "Dynasty's Choice", broadcast on 26 February 2014, when he is arrested for human trafficking after being reported by Dynasty. Au thought it was suitable that Dynasty reported Barry and opined that the character's exit needed to be drastic. The character received a mixed response from television critics: the family were criticised for being a bad representation of a Liverpudlian family, while Clemmie Moodie of the Daily Mirror praised Au's performance in the role.

== Character creation ==
Barry is created as part of the Liverpudlian criminal Barry family, consisting of single mother Carol Barry (Zöe Lucker) and her three "unruly" children: son Barry Barry (Carl Au) and daughters Dynasty Barry (Abby Mavers) and Kacey Barry (Brogan Ellis). The children join Waterloo Road's new Pupil Referral Unit (PRU) in hope of making them exemplar students. Lucker liked the "outrageous" family unit, but admitted, "you just wouldn't want the Barrys in your neighbourhood!" Au felt welcomed by the cast and crew of Waterloo Road and enjoyed working in Greenock, where the drama is filmed. The actor enjoyed portraying the character because he differed to other characters that he has played. He added that he felt privileged to portray a multi-dimensional character.

== Development ==
=== Characterisation and introduction ===
"There's always reasons for his actions. He won't just go and be a bully for nothing - there's always reasons for it. It's partly down to him trying to make a stand in this new school that he's come into. The Barrys have a massive reputation, so they have a name that they want to live up to."

— Carl Au on Barry's behaviour. (2013)

Barry is introduced as the drama's new "bad boy" character. Au thought that this could make his character unpopular with the audience, but believed that those who disliked the character would still enjoy watching him. Barry is 19 years old and has been held back to continue his education. Lucker described Barry as "very wayward", unfocused and troublesome, and said that Barry is not afraid of anyone except Carol. She also called Barry "the apple of Carol's eye". She added that Barry seeks his mother's affection. Barry is smart and witty; Au believed that if he applied that to school, he could be a good student. Au also called Barry a "very complex" character and said that he always had reasons for his behaviour. The actor wanted to explore the complexity of Barry's character and the reasons for how he acts. Barry does not share his feelings and Au thought it would take a particular character to manage that. He also told Elaine Reilly of What's on TV that Barry craves "attention and love". Au explained that while Barry appears to be a "cool, rebellious individual", he has many layers to his personality. He also believed that Barry is unaware of his true capability, and should Barry become "extreme", he could be "terrifyingly dangerous". The actor also mentioned an interest in seeing the character undergo "a revelation and sort himself out".

Barry's criminal father, Neil Barry, is never seen and only referenced in the show as he is in prison for armed robbery. Au noted that following his father's imprisonment, Barry has "been trying to fill his shoes" because he wants to maintain the family's reputation. In preparation for the role of Barry, Au researched the behaviour children with absent fathers and discovered that it leaves an impact on them, explaining an aspect of Barry's behaviour. Au believed that Barry's "swagger and intimidating persona" could conceal his "underlying fears, resentments and anxieties" relating to his father. A part of Barry's characterisation is his dislike for authority and his disdain for the teachers at Waterloo Road. Au explained that this stems from his connection to his father and is the reason why Barry is not afraid or intimidated by anybody.

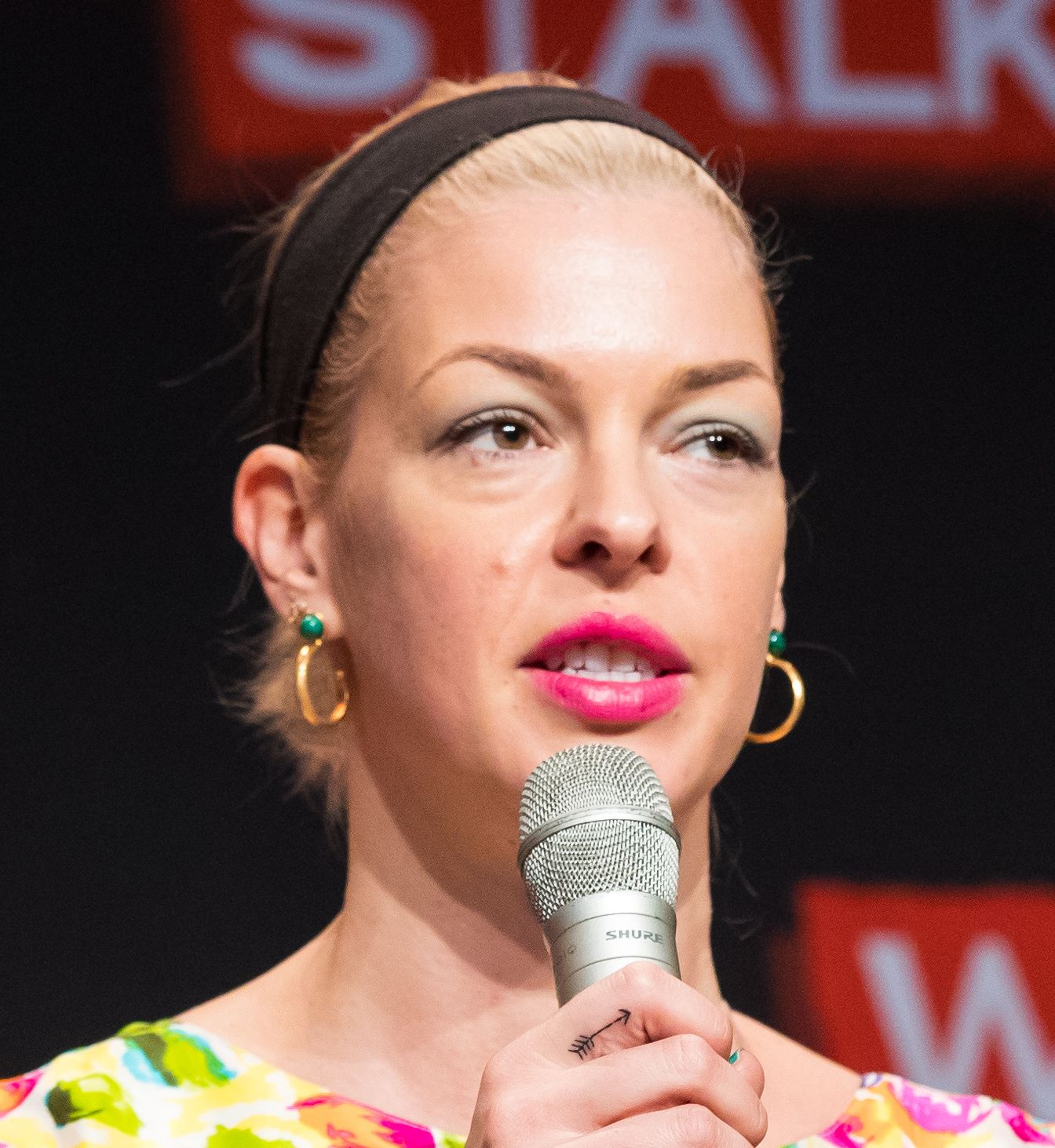
Pollyanna McIntosh (pictured) portrays Barry's first romantic partner, Olivia MacAlister.

Writers devised the family as being "very individual and loud", which Au said forced the actors to "take it by the horns and go with it". He explained that the Barry family are "outrageous" and fearless in regards to "status and competition". The actor told Kilkelly that he is "very passionate" about the Barry family and believes that Liverpool should also be proud of them. Despite this, he felt no pressure for the representation of Liverpool and instead focused on creating entertainment through the family. Barry has a tense relationship with Dynasty, although they do love each other dearly. Au explained that their relationship is fraught because Barry dislikes Dynasty's "crazy attempts to distance herself away from the family". Mavers noted that Barry and Dynasty share a "love-hate relationship" with Dynasty regularly suggesting that she hates Barry.

Barry first appears jumping out of a window, which Au thought was memorable. After enrolling in the school with his sisters, Barry soon establishes a feud with Jack MacAlister (Taylor Rhys) and they fight. It emerges that Barry is in a relationship with Jack's mother, Olivia MacAlister (Pollyanna McIntosh). Despite promising to keep the relationship subtle, Barry humiliates Jack in front of school by sharing a sexual video of him and Olivia. Headteacher Michael Byrne (Alec Newman) gives Barry a warning and when Carol discovers what Barry has done, she arrives at the school to confront Barry, before slapping him in front of his peers at school. Lucker was shocked by Carol's actions and did not feel that she could actually hit Au. The actress had to "psyche [herself] up" for her character hitting Barry. Lucker found the scene unforgettable to her as it was an unfamiliar concept. On the scene, she commented, "I couldn't believe anyone would do that to someone they love."

=== Relationships ===
==== Kacey Barry ====
Barry has a close relationship with his younger sister Kacey and in their fictional backstory, they would frequently play football together, which has resulted in Kacey's talent for the sport. Shortly after the family's arrival, Kacey is featured in a storyline exploring gender identity. In the plot, Kacey realises that she is more comfortable as a boy and confides in Barry about her realisation. He reacts badly and cannot accept it, resulting in argument which is overheard by the rest of the school. Ellis thought that Barry reacts as such because he is worried that their family will become an "embarrassment", and Au believed that Barry reacts badly because he realises that he "doesn't know the person he grew up with", which surprises him. He added that Barry is struggling to comprehend the situation as much as Kacey. Ellis also pointed out that Barry's "mental" reaction causes other people to behave differently around Kacey. Au thought it was vital to show that Barry does not accept Kacey as it reflected real life. He confirmed that Barry would be shown to struggle with Kacey worrying that he does not love her anymore. Au explained that Barry still loves Kacey, but he is struggling to convey that love. He also looked forward to seeing how the audience responded to Barry's reaction.

==== Sian Diamond ====
"Sian thinking that she knows Barry's sister better than he does is something he will not stand for. No matter who it is, he will go all-out to bring that person down and destroy them."

— Au on the reasons for Barry's behaviour towards Sian. (2013)

Through his place in the PRU, Nikki Boston (Heather Peace), the head of the unit, teaches Barry, although they do not bond due to Nikki's "commanding attitude". Barry is consequently paired with science teacher Sian Diamond (Jaye Jacobs), who he bonds with. Barry likes how Sian respects him and treats him with maturity, so he "puts a bit of a guard down". Barry is also attracted to Sian and her strong-willed personality. Kacey telling her family that she is a boy creates tension between them and Sian tries to mediate, irritating Barry and Carol. Au explained that Barry dislikes Sian getting involved in the family's drama. He commented, "Sian thinking that she knows Barry's sister better than he does is something he will not stand for." Barry then starts a "vendetta" against Sian, planning to "bring [her] down and destroy [her]".

As part of the feud against Sian, Barry breaks into Sian's home to steal her underwear. He also discovers a personal photo of Sian and Michael, which Au stated that Barry plans to "use against her". Barry wants to remove Sian from the school. After going to Sian's classroom, he reveals the underwear to her class, so Sian slaps Barry. Au said that Barry is "genuinely surprised" by Sian's actions since she has acted differently to other teachers. He added that Sian is equally shocked by her actions, and revealed that Barry plots how to use the situation to his benefit. The story forms Sian's departure from the series following Jacobs' decision to leave. Au and Jacobs repeatedly rehearsed the slap scene with the stunt coordinator and when they first filmed the scene, Jacobs accidentally slapped Au, which she was not supposed to do, shocking the actress. Au enjoyed working with Jacobs and off-screen, they bonded over their shared theatre training and music interests. Between filming, the actors would sing together to lighten the mood.

==== Gabriella Wark ====
Naomi Battrick was cast as new student Gabriella Wark in the ninth series. The character was then romantically paired with Barry, who she meets while on a night out with Rhiannon Salt (Rebecca Craven) and Imogen Stewart (Kirstie Steele). Barry soon meets Gabriella after he "catches [her] wandering eye". Battrick liked the characters' pairing and called it "a very interesting move" because they are alike. She also pointed out that Gabriella feels "a little bit higher up the rankings" in comparison to Barry. The actress also explained that Gabriella seeks the relationship because she wants to create bother and gain attention. Gabriella later begins to develop feelings for Barry.

Barry tries to impress Gabriella by inviting her on a lunch date in an effort to display his "romantic side". Gabriella accepts, but brings Rhiannon to spite Barry, knowing that he dislikes Rhiannon. Barry collects Gabriella in "a flash car and a stylish suit" and their date is ruined by Barry when he grows tired of Rhiannon. These were the final scenes that Au filmed with the drama due to the filming schedule. Gabriella ends their relationship after realising Barry has feelings for her. Battrick explained that she ends the relationship because "the chase was over and so it was boring for her".

==== Other characters ====
Following Sian's departure, a new science teacher, Sue Spark (Vanessa Hehir), is introduced to the series. Sue struggles with the students, which Barry notices and exploits. Hehir quipped that Barry "can smell fear". Barry agrees to control Sue's classes in exchange for money as well as keeping her engagement to deputy headteacher Simon Lowsley (Richard Mylan) a secret. Hehir thought that Sue is "making a pact with the devil" by agreeing to Barry's deal. She explained that Sue agrees to Barry's deal due to her lack of confidence and because she wants to "impress" her husband and keep her job. Hehir enjoyed working with Au, but thought he could be scary in character.

The character is involved in a sexting storyline through his friendship with Darren Hughes (Mark Beswick). Darren aspires to be like Barry, which Barry uses to his advantage. After Darren begins a relationship with Rhiannon, Barry peer pressures him into asking her for naked images. Craven noted that since Rhiannon gives Darren her phone number, Barry questions "what else is [Rhiannon] willing to give out". The actress explained that Barry "rules the roost at the school" and pushes Darren into asking Rhiannon. She added that Darren is not being "nasty and vindictive" because he does not realise his actions. After Rhiannon sends Darren images of herself, Barry takes Darren's phone and sends the photos to himself, which he then shares across the school. Craven explained that Barry is "the ringleader of it all". Consequently, Dynasty and Imogen get revenge on Barry and Darren for their actions by taking photos of them as they get out of the showers.

=== Theft ===
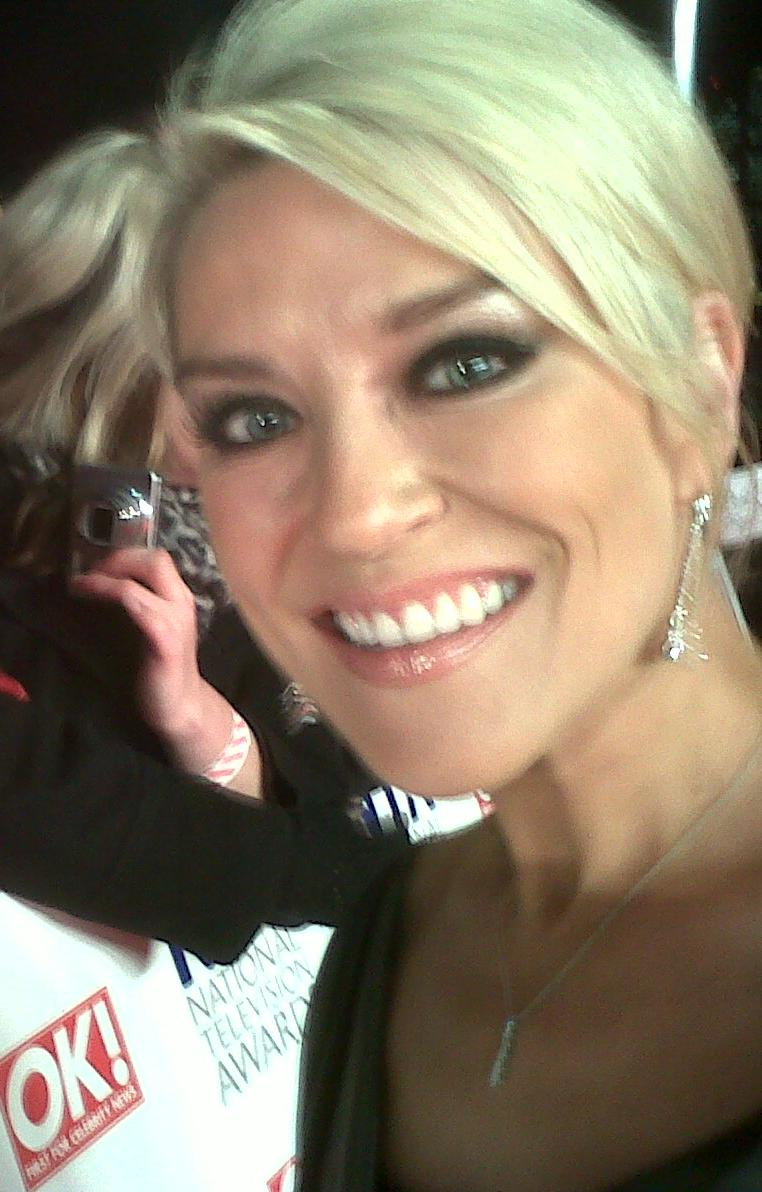
Actress Zöe Lucker (pictured) portrays Barry's mother, Carol Barry, who is devastated by Barry stealing from Kacey.

Kacey is offered a boxing scholarship in America and the school raise almost £10,000 to achieve the scholarship. However, the money is stolen by Barry. Au explained that Barry steals the money because he wants to keep his family together and is envious of Kacey receiving the school's support for her boxing ability. Barry struggles to understand Kacey's "growth and development" as a boxer and believes that she is being self-centered by following her ambitions. Au commented, "Barry's morals are all really messed up. He feels that Kacey has been given false hope by the school and everyone who supports her." Au told Reilly (What's on TV) that Barry does not steal the money to be "malicious", but admitted that Barry does "get a kick out of causing mischief". Barry does not feel guilty for his actions because he is of the opinion that his actions are justified. He experiences a brief moment of questioning his actions, but soon dismisses the worries. Au explained that Barry's love for Kacey overlooks any potential worry about whether he is doing the right thing. He also said that Barry does not consider the consequences of his actions until "they're presented to him". Barry is not remorseful for his actions because he enjoys the "sense of power over people" that accompanies stealing the money.

Barry plans to use the money for his own benefit and for his father when he is released from prison. When asked Barry whether would follow his father's actions, Au pointed out that Barry could easily be imprisoned for his actions. During a farewell celebration for Kacey, Barry is exposed as the thief to the whole school and Carol. Au observed that Carol is "shocked, appalled and deeply hurt" that Barry could do that to his family. He also thought that it would heavily affect the family unit and commented, "the Barry family will never be the same again". The actor pointed out that Barry does not enjoy to "being on the end of Carol's wrath" and predicted a "thunderous effect" when the truth is revealed. Lucker confirmed that Carol is devastated by Barry's actions and feels a responsible to decide whether to report Barry to the police for his actions. Appearing on daytime panel show Loose Women, Lucker explained that Carol is given a "Sophie's Choice", which is a "horrible, horrible situation to be in".

Carol does not forgive Barry for his behaviour and consequently, Barry breaks down. Au wanted to detail the emotional side of Barry's personality in the episodes as he felt it would give a better view of the character to the audience. He explained that he chose to surprise the audience by portraying "a very distressed moment for Barry". The actor wanted to explore the character in great depth and hoped to expose the "tightly-kept struggles, hurts and emotions" that he has suppressed because he felt that it was a pivotal characteristic of Barry. Au also expressed an interest in seeing Barry interacting with his father "on whichever side of the bars" because he felt the relationship would be "electric and a great dynamic". He thought a potential experience in prison would be "very exposing territory" for Barry and he did not believe that Barry would cope well. Carol exiles Barry from the family's lives. Lucker said that Carol did not want to do that, but "felt that she had no choice" because Barry had broken a family rule. In November 2013, Au stated that the episode where Barry is exposed as the thief is one of his favourite episodes because it thoroughly explores Barry's personality.

=== Absence and departure ===
After being exiled from the family, Barry is absent from the show for a few episodes. During his absence, Barry seeks "stability and comfort" in working with criminals. Au explained that Barry does not see any other option. Following the absence, Au appears across five episode for his character's final arc. Upon his return, Barry has a new hairstyle with the back and sides of his head shaved; Au dubbed the hairstyle "The Ferret". Au liked the hairstyle, but was pleased that he did not have to go bald. Lucker observed that Barry returns with a darker side, which worries Carol. She explained that Carol "doesn't have any control over Barry anymore", which sparks "interesting" scenes between the characters. Barry wants to return to the family home, but when Carol does not let him, he starts blackmailing her. Lucker billed the story as "dark". Barry's return relieves Dynasty of the duties she has taken on in his absence. Mavers thought that Barry appears "so different and grown-up" upon his return.

Au departed the drama towards the end of the ninth series. He filmed his final scenes in October 2013 and after shooting, producer Lizzie Gray made a speech for Au and he received presents from the crew, including a signed photo of the Barry family and Barry's shoes, which the actor thought was apt since he had "enjoyed walking in them for so long". Au expressed his sadness at leaving his role, but was also looking forward to pursuing new opportunities. He did not want to stay for too long on the drama because he believed his character was "full-lived and outrageously bold". He added that it was the right decision for Barry to leave the school as it was natural for teenage characters to leave the school environment. The actor was also thankful that Barry was not killed off. On a potential return for the character, Au commented, "Never say never!" He added that he wanted Barry to be referenced in the show after his exit. After leaving the drama, Au remained in contact with his on-screen family. Two years after his exit from the series, Au reflected positively on the role in an interview with Paddy Shennan of the Liverpool Echo. He told the reporter that he enjoyed reading scripts and finding out about "what [Barry] was going to get up to next".

Barry's exit storyline sees him making money after becoming involved in human trafficking. Despite being surprised by the story, Au understood that the character's exit needed to be "something extreme". He opined that a story about human trafficking is "too big for one episode", but had to be forced into a single episode. After discovering that Barry is involved in human trafficking, Dynasty reports Barry to the police. On Dynasty's reasons for reporting Barry, Mavers commented, "She wants to do what's morally right and she's trying to break the chain." She also explained that for Barry, it is "tough love". Au thought that it was appropriate for Dynasty to report Barry as it makes him realise that his actions are wrong and "unforgivable". The actor was happy that Barry got his comeuppance as he opined that Barry's actions were "inexcusable and demoralising". Au also wished for the audience to remember Barry's "vulnerable, softer side" and how he is "totally misunderstood".

== Reception ==
Following their introduction, the Barry family were criticised for being a bad representation of a Liverpudlian family. George McKane, a representative for charity Yellow House, called the representation "offensive and closed-minded", but they were defended by Cameron Roach of Shed Productions who did not believe the family were "stereotypical" and advised those with that view to continue watching the family for "surprises". Kilkelly (Digital Spy) described the Barry family as "a hell-raising criminal clan".

Jane Simon and Brian McIver of the Daily Record were surprised by the naming of the character, writing in a review of his first episode, "Yes, that's right, Barry Barry." Shennan (Liverpool Echo) dubbed the character as a "teenage tearaway" and an "out-of-control teenager". Daily Mirror's Clemmie Moodie opined that Au managed to "effortlessly nail [his] delivery every time". A reporter from the Western Mail thought that Barry was "famously dodgy". Au felt "overwhelmed" by the reaction to his character after receiving comments from the audience through social media. When Barry stole Kacey's fundraiser money, Au received a mix of positive and negative comments from the audience, which he predicted. He commented, "To get a mixed bag response with people questioning Barry's choices is a wonderful thing to see."
