= Waterloo Road series 9 =

Waterloo Road
- Series 9
- Promotional image for Series 9
- Starring: Laurie Brett; Richard Mylan; Angus Deayton; Heather Peace; Melanie Hill; Georgie Glen; Vanessa Hehir; Victoria Bush; Zöe Lucker; Leon Ockenden; Philip Martin Brown; Elizabeth Tan
- No. of episodes: 20

Release
- Original network: BBC One; BBC One HD
- Original release: 5 September 2013 – 12 March 2014

Series chronology
- ← Previous; Series 8 Next → Series 10

The ninth series of the British television drama series Waterloo Road began airing on 5 September 2013 on BBC One and ended on 12 March 2014. The series follows the lives of the staff and Students of the eponymous school, a troubled Scottish comprehensive school. It consists of twenty episodes. This series also marks the departure of Grantly Budgen (Philip Martin Brown), the last of the original cast members.

== Plot ==
The show follows the lives of the teachers and the Students at the eponymous school of Waterloo Road, a failing inner-city comprehensive, tackling a wide range of issues often seen as taboo such as drug dealing, sexting, catfishing, stuttering, prescription drug abuse, stroke, identity fraud, stalking, human trafficking, deportation, drink driving and empty nest syndrome.

== Cast and characters ==
=== Staff ===
- Laurie Brett as Christine Mulgrew; Headteacher (19 episodes)
- Richard Mylan as Simon Lowsley; Deputy Headteacher and English teacher (20 episodes)
- Angus Deayton as George Windsor; Deputy Headteacher and Head of Modern Foreign Languages (20 episodes)
- Heather Peace as Nikki Boston; Head of the Student Referral Unit and English teacher (20 episodes)
- Melanie Hill as Maggie Budgen; Home Economics teacher and Housemistress (20 episodes)
- Georgie Glen as Audrey McFall; Head of History (20 episodes)
- Vanessa Hehir as Sue Lowsley; Science teacher (20 episodes)
- Victoria Bush as Sonya Donnegan; School secretary (20 episodes)
- Zöe Lucker as Carol Barry; Canteen assistant and mother of the Barry children (12 episodes)
- Leon Ockenden as Hector Reid; Head of Physical Education (10 episodes)
- Philip Martin Brown as Grantly Budgen; English teacher and Housemaster (4 episodes)
- Elizabeth Tan as Princess Windsor; Mandarin Teaching Assistant and George's wife (3 episodes)

=== Students ===
- Mark Beswick as Darren Hughes (20 episodes)
- Rebecca Craven as Rhiannon Salt (20 episodes)
- Abby Mavers as Dynasty Barry (20 episodes)
- Kirstie Steele as Imogen Stewart (20 episodes)
- Kane Tomlinson-Weaver as Harley Taylor (20 episodes)
- Caitlin Gillespie as Lisa Brown (19 episodes)
- Je'Taime Morgan Hanley as Shaznay Montrose (19 episodes)
- Tommy Lawrence Knight as Kevin Chalk (19 episodes)
- Joe Slater as Lenny Brown (19 episodes)
- Marlene Madenge as Lula Tsibi (17 episodes)
- Carl Au as Barry Barry (16 episodes)
- Shane O'Meara as Connor Mulgrew (15 episodes)
- Christopher Chung as Archie Wong (12 episodes)
- Brogan Ellis as Kacey Barry (12 episodes)
- Naomi Battrick as Gabriella Wark (10 episodes)

=== Others ===
==== Recurring ====
- Kristin Atherton as Vix Spark; Sue's sister and Nikki's fiancée (10 episodes)
- Shaun Prendergast as Robert Bain; Director of the Department for Education and Sue and Vix's father (4 episodes)
- Sophie Skelton as Eve Boston; Nikki's estranged daughter (2 episodes)
- Connie Hyde as Amelia Wark; Gabriella's mother (2 episodes)
- Sarah Niles as Cecile Tsibi; Lula's mother (2 episodes)

==== Guest ====
- Tomasz Aleksander as Josef Kowalski; Shopkeeper (1 episode)
- Mark Benton as Daniel "Chalky" Chalk; Former Mathematics teacher and Kevin's adoptive father (1 episode)
- Daniel Brocklebank as Stuart Cooper; Nikki's ex-husband and Eve's father (1 episode)
- Naveed Choudhry as Tariq Siddiqui; Ex-Student (1 episode)
- Wendy Craig as Marjorie Windsor; George's mother (1 episode)
- Nicola Jo Cully as Avril Mack; Stevie's mother (1 episode)
- Charles De'Ath as Vincent Wark; Gabriella's father (1 episode)
- Keeley Forsyth as Sammy Hughes; Darren's mother (1 episode)
- Grant Gillen as Stevie Mack; Student (1 episode)
- John Kazek as Mr. Kowalski; Shop owner (1 episode)
- Duncan Pow as Jim Ronsley/"Frankie McGregor"; Fraudulent supply teacher (1 episode)
- Clive Russell as Sergeant Major Lawrence Brown; Lenny and Lisa's estranged grandfather (1 episode)
- Jenny Ryan as Sally Stewart; Governor and Imogen's mother (1 episode)
- James Young as Larry Brown; Lenny and Lisa's older brother (1 episode)

== Episodes ==
| No. | Title | Directed by | Written by | Original release date | UK viewers (million) |
|---|---|---|---|---|---|
Autumn Term
| 161 | "Beyond the Call of Duty" | Patrick Harkins | Liz Lake | 5 September 2013 | N/A (<4.01) (Note: Not reported in the weekly top 30 programmes for BBC One.) |
Audrey is concerned when former Havelock High pupils Lenny and Lisa Brown enrol at Waterloo Road, and when Christine dismisses her worries she attempts to take matters into her own hands. Nikki tries to help Kacey, who is struggling to deal with Tom's death. Sue Spark joins the school as a Science teacher, and Simon harbours a secret. Note: First appearance of Lenny & Lisa Brown, Darren Hughes, Sue Spark, Shaznay Montrose, and Archie Wong.
| 162 | "Sue Spark's Bad Day" | Patrick Harkins | Jaden Clark | 12 September 2013 | N/A (<3.76) |
The day from hell for new science teacher, Sue Spark, leads to a shady alliance with a student. George introduces the school to his new Mandarin teaching assistant, and wife, Princess Windsor, who is immediately popular with some of his class. Elsewhere, the pupils are angry about the closure of the Breakfast Club and the cancellation of school trips due to the many budget cuts.
| 163 | "The Madness of King Windsor" | Roberto Bangura | Paul Mousley | 19 September 2013 | N/A (<3.61) |
Princess is increasingly irritated by George, which leads to temptation with one of his pupils. There's a battle of the sexes as Simon's Apprentice competition takes over the school, Kevin has itchy feet and Audrey thinks she's made a new friend. As the council decides to roll out his Mandarin programme throughout the local area, Princess is worried about George's poor Mandarin skills and increasingly angered by his assumption that she'll save him from being exposed.
| 164 | "Text Rated" | Roberto Bangura | Karen Laws | 26 September 2013 | N/A (<3.86) |
Rhiannon sends saucy pictures of herself to Darren and they end up being sent to mobile phones around the school. George finds out Princess is leaving him. And Audrey discovers Lisa and Lenny are trying to scam money out of her. Note: Final appearance of Princess Windsor
| 165 | "Crossing the Line" | David Innes Edwards | Paul Farrel | 3 October 2013 | N/A (<3.84) |
Lisa and Lenny Brown's grandfather turns up out of the blue and risks splitting them up. Elsewhere, Christine is furious when she finds out George's secret about his Mandarin abilities, and, ends up having another fight with Connor when he realises that he is good at cooking.
| 166 | "Grantly's Perfect Poetry" | David Innes Edwards | David McManus | 10 October 2013 | N/A (<3.78) |
Grantly returns to teaching but only gets as far as the school gates before admitting to Maggie he is having second thoughts. Christine eases him back in by asking him to help out with the national school poetry competition, but things soon fall apart when his temper gets the better of him and he accuses Harley of plagiarism. The day of Kacey's first big fight arrives and she is already dreaming of Commonwealth Games glory. Barry, however, has a different idea up his sleeve as he starts taking bets against his sister winning. Sue is struggling to cope with her classes and turns to tranquillisers. After this he realises the mistake he's made and routes for the poem. He gives it to Harley to read on stage, but, while Harley reads it Grantly dies. Note: Final appearance of Grantly Budgen; the final original cast member.
| 167 | "Lies Mothers Tell" | Craig Pickles | Kelly Jones | 17 October 2013 | N/A (<3.97) |
When her estranged daughter turns up, Nikki faces a tough decision. Christine and Simon's relationship is strained further when the school's sponsored clean goes awry. Meanwhile Carol Barry is not happy about Kacey's Application to boxing school. Note: Return and final appearance of Tariq Siddiqui.
| 168 | "Don't Mention the War" | Craig Pickles | Keith Brumpton | 24 October 2013 | N/A (<4.07) |
The staff and pupils get all dressed up when Living History Week hits Waterloo Road. Christine is looking to impress visitor Robert Bain from the Department of Education, but Simon is on a mission to prove what a bad head teacher she is. And when Darren and Barry go foraging for mushrooms in the woods, resulting in the paramedics being called. Sue learns a secret that threatens to expose George's Mandarin failings, criticising her leadership doesn't prove difficult, while Kevin tries to woo Dynasty back into his arms.
| 169 | "Father Figure" | Jamie Annett | Viv Adam | 31 October 2013 | N/A (<3.94) |
Boxing hopeful Kacey's confidence begins to waver as the school and her family get stuck into raising funds for her sports scholarship – especially when Nikki arranges a visit from Olympic champion Nicola Adams. However, jealous Barry is soon hatching his own plans for the money they have raised. New supply teacher Frankie McGregor's heavy-handed approach divides Christine and Simon, and as the twins grow apart, he proves an unlikely companion for the lonely Lenny.
| 170 | "Happy Ever After" | Jamie Annett | Chris Murray | 7 November 2013 | N/A (<3.94) |
The day of the interviews for the headship arrives, although Christine worries the odds are stacked against her as Simon clearly has Bain's support and Imogen's mother is also on the panel. However, Simon is also feeling extra pressure from his father-in-law, just as he is getting cold feet about marrying Sue. When he is asked to sort things out for a bullied pupil, he clashes with Christine over how best to deal with the problem. Meanwhile, Nikki is shocked to discover someone has stolen Kacey's boxing fund, jeopardising her hopes of training in the USA – and when the identity of the thief comes to light, the news threatens to split the Barry family for good. Note: First appearance of Vix Spark. Final appearance of Kacey Barry (until episode 19) and Barry Barry (until episode 13)
Spring Term
| 171 | "Bad Girl" | Audrey Cooke | Wendy Granditer | 8 January 2014 | N/A (<4.60) |
When blonde bombshell Gabriella Wark explodes on the scene, she immediately causes problems for staff and pupils. With her sights firmly set on hot new PE teacher Hector, this is one girl who won't blend into the school furniture. Meanwhile, newlywed Simon's brand new Resilience Education scheme kicks off the new term with a bang and a disagreement with Christine. you also learn that Nikki Boston is seeing Vix Spark, Sue's sister, and new PE teacher, Mr Reid has his eyes set firmly on Nikki. Note: First appearance of Hector Reid and Gabriella Wark. Sue Spark is known as Sue Lowsley.
| 172 | "Sugar Daddy" | Audrey Cooke | Lauren Klee | 15 January 2014 | N/A (<4.40) |
Carol Barry is flat broke. Desperate to pay for Dynasty to go on the school trip, she takes a job in the school kitchen and soon starts to enjoy some 'added extras'. With the bailiffs still on her back, Carol needs a second job. She reluctantly returns to her old bar job, but it's not long until her sleazy boss is up to his old tricks. When a familiar face comes to her rescue, Carol wonders if romance – and the answer to her monetary problems – may lie a little closer to home. Meanwhile, with Maggie's support and Imogen's blessing, Connor is beaming from his job offer in London. All he has to do is convince a devastated Christine to let him go. Elsewhere, Vix presents Nikki with some beautiful handmade jewellery, but Nikki is left confused. On one hand, it's all going so fast, but on the other she was hoping for something a little bit smaller and… ring-shaped.
| 173 | "Girls Just Wanna Have Fun" | Fiona Walton | Matthew Barry | 22 January 2014 | N/A (<4.29) |
When Dynasty embarrasses her in front of hunky Hector, Gabriella declares war and begins to sabotage Dynasty's friendships and schoolwork. Imogen and Rhiannon join Gabriella for a night out, but it doesn't take long for them to find themselves in trouble. Later, a knight in tarnished armour makes a shock return and quickly captures Gabriella's wandering eye... Note: Barry Barry returns. Final appearance of Connor Mulgrew (until episode 20).
| 174 | "Suspicious Minds" | Fiona Walton | Cat Jones | 29 January 2014 | N/A (<4.48) |
Simon and Hector's Resilience Programme is in full swing. This week, the students learn the importance of vigilance, or 'no guts, no glory' as George describes it. With George's words echoing in his head and no Lisa to rein him in, Lenny lets his imagination run wild and is certain the local shop is just a cover for some criminal activity. He enlists Darren to hold a stake-out, but their meddling causes widespread panic, highlighting the dangers of prejudice and wannabe heroism.Elsewhere, Barry is back and this time he won't leave so easily. All he wants is to come home and he's prepared to play dirty to get there.
| 175 | "Out of Bounds" | Richard Platt | Ann Marie Di Mambro | 5 February 2014 | N/A (<4.60) |
There's a buzz in the air as the day of Simon's Resilience Camp finally arrives. As students and staff split up to find their way to base camp, Hector uses the cover of the woods for his own agenda. Unaccustomed to being rejected by women, Hector seizes the chance for some time alone with Nikki and pulls out all the stops to impress her – despite her recent engagement to Vix.
| 176 | "A Bolt from the Blue" | Richard Platt | David McManus | 12 February 2014 | N/A (<4.72) |
Kevin is a bag of nerves as his university bursary interview looms, despite the legendary Chalky arriving to lend his support. Kevin's anxiety gets the better of him and he and Dynasty bicker over their very different ideas about the future. Before they can reconcile, Kevin suddenly collapses and is rushed to hospital, sending shockwaves rippling through the school. Meanwhile, full of regret, Nikki frantically tries to cover up her one night stand with Hector, but when a vindictive Gabriella finds out, she sets out to destroy Nikki's relationship with Vix. Elsewhere, Lula is overjoyed to be offered a university placement, but her excitement is short-lived when her family is threatened with deportation. Note: Return and final appearance of Daniel 'Chalky' Chalk.
| 177 | "Nowhere to Run" | Alex Kalymnios | Ann McManus & Diane Burrows | 19 February 2014 | N/A (<4.55) |
George is left holding the fort while Christine has a day off, but his opportunity to skive is soon thwarted by news that Lula's mother has been taken away by the Immigration Office. When her pleas for help fall on deaf ears, Lula turns to Audrey, who rallies the school to protect her. While George is off enjoying a charity lunch, the immigration officers arrive for Lula, but Audrey and the students are prepared. Soon a mass rooftop protest is under way, much to Simon's Horror. Meanwhile, Barry takes Gabriella to a fancy restaurant to announce his plans for their future together, but his dreams are short-lived when Gabriella is less than receptive.
| 178 | "Dynasty's Choice" | Alex Kalymnios | Karen Laws | 26 February 2014 | N/A (<4.71) |
Dynasty sets off for a police interview, but her hopes are dashed when her family's criminal background is revealed. She is soon distracted by Barry's cagey behaviour and is shocked to uncover the truth behind his new job. To prove she is not cut from the same cloth, Dynasty is forced to make a weighty decision that will change the Barrys' lives once and for all. Meanwhile, Darren is in serious trouble when he is discovered with indecent images on his phone yet again. Determined to get to the root of Darren's behaviour, Christine makes an unannounced visit to his home, but is left appalled and shaken by what she finds. Note: Final appearance of Barry Barry.
| 179 | "End of the Road" | Patrick Harkins | Cat Jones | 5 March 2014 | N/A (<4.52) |
Christine wakes up with a horrific hangover. In a massive error of judgement, she gets into her car while still under the influence and drives to school. From that moment on, Christine's day descends from bad to worse until she must make a terrible choice on her future at Waterloo Road: Resign or face the music. Meanwhile, Kacey Barry returns from the US to a hero's welcome, but a jealous Gabriella is fuming that all attention is no longer on her. Determined to get even, Gabriella unleashes her vindictive side, but it's Kevin who bears the brunt of her anger. Note: Final appearance of Lula Tsibi and Archie Wong. Kacey Barry returns.
| 180 | "New Highs, New Lows" | Patrick Harkins | Alexander Lamb | 12 March 2014 | N/A (<4.40) |
A sober Christine deals with the repercussions of her drink-driving offence. Kacey is selected for the Commonwealth Games but Gabriella soon puts an end to her happiness. Nikki's future at Waterloo Road is suddenly thrown into uncertainty. Connor returns to support a vulnerable Christine amid the fallout of her drink-driving incident. Though she vows to make amends, both the school and the Education Board are divided on her future at Waterloo Road, and Simon is made Acting Head by Robert Bain. Kacey and Gabriella's feud escalates and turns nasty as Gabriella causes an accident that leaves Kacey's boxing dreams in tatters. Nikki's career is called into question when Gabriella accuses Nikki of attacking her. Vix reaches out to her in support, but will there be time for them to reconcile before Vix leaves for good? Note: Final appearance of Nikki Boston, Connor and Imogen Mulgrew, Robert Bain and Vix Spark and Gabriella Wark (until Series 10).
