= Laurie Mansfield =

Theatrical agent

- Born: 27 March 1943 (age 83); Birmingham, England
- Occupation: Theatrical agent

Laurie Mansfield (born 27 March 1943) is a theatrical agent from Birmingham.

He is best known as an agent for British entertainers from the 1970s onwards.

== Early career ==
Mansfield entered show business first as a salesman for CBS Records, and then as a record producer. In 1969, this led him into the agency business, where he became responsible for building International Artistes Ltd into one of the most successful all-purpose management and agency companies in the UK.

In April 2010, a new company was formed called Laurie Mansfield Associates, presenting a combination of both theatrical production and talent representation.

== Theatre producer ==
In 1989, Mansfield co-produced Buddy: The Buddy Holly Story, which completed 13 years in London's West End, and was subsequently produced across the world.

He co-produced the Olivier Award-winning musical Jolson in London's West End then Toronto. Jolson has also toured in the United States and Australia. In 1999, Mansfield co-produced the Olivier Award-winning Defending the Caveman in London. In October 1999, he was the lead producer on Great Balls of Fire, the Jerry Lee Lewis story, at the Cambridge Theatre.

In 2006, his first co-production with Bill Kenwright was the original tour of This Is Elvis. The pair went on to co-produce many successful touring musicals including West End hit Dreamboats and Petticoats and its sequel Dreamboats and Miniskirts; Save the Last Dance for Me; Laughter in the Rain: The Neil Sedaka Story; and Cilla The Musical, based on the early life of Cilla Black, written by the award-winning Jeff Pope.

== Charity work ==
Mansfield is the Life President of the Royal Variety Charity (formerly the Entertainment Artistes' Benevolent Fund), which maintains the retirement home for entertainers, Brinsworth House in Twickenham. Through the RVC, he is closely involved with The Royal Variety Show, the proceeds of which support the charity's work. He is also President of the British Forces Foundation (founded by Jim Davidson), formed to promote and support the armed forces for charitable means by entertaining servicemen and women around the world.
