= Waterloo Road series 7 =

Waterloo Road
- Series 7
- DVD cover
- Starring: Amanda Burton; William Ash; Jason Done; Philip Martin Brown; Mark Benton; Chelsee Healey; Alec Newman; Chris Geere; Jaye Jacobs; Alex Walkinshaw; Robson Green; Melanie Hill; Poppy Jhakra; Sarah Hadland; Heather Peace
- No. of episodes: 30

Release
- Original network: BBC One
- Original release: 4 May 2011 – 25 April 2012

Series chronology
- ← Previous; Series 6 Next → Series 8

The seventh series of the British television drama series Waterloo Road began broadcasting on 4 May 2011, and ended on 25 April 2012 on BBC One. The series follows the lives of the faculty and students of the eponymous school, a failing inner-city comprehensive school. It consists of thirty episodes, and shown in three blocks of ten episodes each. The seventh series achieved an average of 5.30 million viewers in the ratings. It is the last series to be set in Rochdale, England, before the show was moved from England to Scotland.

== Plot ==
The show follows the lives of the teachers and the pupils at the eponymous school of Waterloo Road, a failing inner-city comprehensive.

== Cast and characters ==
=== Staff ===
- Amanda Burton as Karen Fisher; Headteacher (10 episodes)
- William Ash as Christopher "Chris" Mead; Deputy Headteacher and Science teacher (10 episodes)
- Jason Done as Tom Clarkson; Head of English later Deputy Headteacher and English teacher (30 episodes)
- Philip Martin Brown as Grantly Budgen; Acting Head of English (30 episodes)
- Mark Benton as Daniel "Chalky" Chalk; Maths teacher (29 episodes)
- Chelsee Healey as Janeece Bryant; School secretary (27 episodes)
- Alec Newman as Michael Byrne; Headteacher replacing Karen Fisher (20 episodes)
- Chris Geere as Matt Wilding; returning Head of Music and Drama (20 episodes)
- Jaye Jacobs as Sian Diamond; Deputy Headteacher and Head of Science (20 episodes)
- Alex Walkinshaw as Jeremy "Jez" Diamond; Head of Physical Education (18 episodes)
- Robson Green as Rob Scotcher; Site manager (10 episodes)
- Melanie Hill as Maggie Croft; Senior Canteen Assistant (10 episodes)
- Poppy Jhakra as Eleanor Chaudry; English teacher (10 episodes)
- Sarah Hadland as Linda Radleigh; Head of English (9 episodes)
- Heather Peace as Nikki Boston; Head of English and Media Studies (8 episodes)

=== Students ===
- Reece Douglas as Denzil Kelly (29 episodes)
- Millie Katana as Shona Mansfield (29 episodes)
- Darcy Isa as Lauren Andrews (28 episodes)
- Hope Katana as Rhona Mansfield (28 episodes)
- Jack McMullen as Finn Sharkey (28 episodes)
- William Rush as Josh Stevenson (25 episodes)
- Shannon Flynn as Emily "Em" James (24 episodes)
- Katie McGlynn as Jodie "Scout" Allen (24 episodes)
- Ben-Ryan Davies as Ronan Burley (21 episodes)
- Kaya Moore as Phoenix Taylor (20 episodes)
- Aryana Ramkhalawon as Trudi Siddiqui (20 episodes)
- Rebecca Ryan as Vicki MacDonald (20 episodes)
- Naveed Choudhry as Tariq Siddiqui (19 episodes)
- Lee Abbate as Zack Diamond (19 episodes)
- Georgia Henshaw as Madi Diamond (19 episodes)
- George Sampson as Kyle Stack (18 episodes)
- Kane Tomlinson-Weaver as Harley Taylor (18 episodes)
- Linzey Cocker as Jess Fisher (10 episodes)
- Oliver Lee as Aiden Scotcher (10 episodes)
- Shifaa Arfann as Naseem Siddiqui (9 episodes)
- Ayesha Gwilt as Amy Porter (9 episodes)
- Ceallach Spellman as Harry Fisher (8 episodes)
- Holly Kenny as Sambuca Kelly (6 episodes)

=== Others ===
==== Recurring ====
- Elaine Symons as Rose Kelly; Sambuca and Denzil's mother and Canteen Assistant (6 episodes)
- Nicholas Gleaves as Richard Whitman; Director of Education (6 episodes)
- Robert Haythorne as Wayne Johnson; Michael's attacker (6 episodes)
- Matt Kennard as Craig O'Leary; Janeece's fiancé and con artist (6 episodes)
- Stefan Gumbs as Eugene Garvey; Gang leader (5 episodes)
- Jo-Anne Knowles as Rosie Matthews; Matt's pregnant best friend (5 episodes)
- Lisa Riley as Tina Allen; Scout's mother (4 episodes)
- Debra Stephenson as Naomi Scotcher; Rob's ex-wife and Aiden's mother (4 episodes)
- James Gaddas as Alan Dixon; Director of Education (3 episodes)
- John Thomson as Nelson Smith; Phoenix and Harley's father (3 episodes)
- Daniela Denby-Ashe as Lorraine Donnegan; Businesswoman (3 episodes)
- Ian Aspinall as Dr. Kanda; Sambuca's oncologist (2 episodes)
- Andrew McNair as Darren; Scout's drug dealer (2 episodes)
- Jonathan Wrather as Dr. Alex Stoneham; Neonatal consultant caring for Matt and Rosie's baby (2 episodes)

==== Guest ====
- Kirstie Armstrong as Ali Redback; Student (1 episode)
- Jane Asher as Margaret Harker; Investor (1 episode)
- Gemma Atkinson as Mandy; Businesswoman (1 episode)
- Kaine Barr as Mason Price; Student (1 episode)
- Mish Boyko as Danilo Babicz; Student (1 episode)
- Kaya Brady as Mia Willington; Woman who hires Scout as a live-in carer (1 episode)
- Daniel Brocklebank as Karl Johnson; Chair of Governors (1 episode)
- Lorraine Cheshire as Fleur Budgen; Grantly's wife (1 episode)
- Margi Clarke as Bette Mansfield; Rhona and Shona's grandmother (1 episode)
- Matthew Crompton as Simon Walker; Scout's foster father (1 episode)
- Amelia Curtis as Vanessa Cooper; Head of English candidate (1 episode)
- Louise Delamere as Marion James; Emily's mother (1 episode)
- Tupele Dorgu as Keely James; Garden centre manager (1 episode)
- Kriss Dosanjh as Mr. Siddiqui; Tariq, Trudi and Naseem's father (1 episode)
- Alicya Eyo as Sandi Mansfield; Rhona and Shona's mother (1 episode)
- Keicha Greenidge as Mercedes Garvey; Pupil and Eugene's sister (1 episode)
- Matt Greenwood as Martin Dunbar; Student (1 episode)
- Abigail Hardingham as Andi O'Donnell; Student (1 episode)
- Dominique Jackson as Evie Prior; Students (1 episode)
- Emily Joyce as Viv O'Donnell; Radio presenter and Andi's mother (1 episode)
- Andrew Knott as Greg Barrington; Journalist undercover as a teaching assistant (1 episode)
- Greg Kolpakchi as Yevhen Babicz; Danilo's brother (1 episode)
- Maeve Larkin as Julie Walker; Scout's foster mother (1 episode)
- Jacqueline Leonard as Pamela Dunbar; Martin's mother (1 episode)
- Tracy-Ann Oberman as Alison Drew; Schools' inspector (1 episode)
- Kai Owen as Ken Watling; Professional rugby player (1 episode)
- Samuel Holland as Grady; Josh's drug-dealing "boyfriend" (1 episode)
- Roxanne Pallett as Shelby Dixon; Students (1 episode)
- Paul Popplewell as Callum Pearson; Ali's abusive stepfather (1 episode)
- Jodie Prenger as Linda Wickes; Photographer (1 episode)
- Kelly Price as Sarah Diamond; Jez's ex-wife and Madi and Zack's mother (1 episode)
- Samantha Power as Sarah Pearson; Ali's mother (1 episode)
- Meriel Scholfield as Eileen Jackson; Freddie's mother (1 episode)
- Joseph Slack as Stuart Foley; Student (1 episode)
- Niek Versteeg as Freddie Jackson; Student (1 episode)

== Episodes ==
No.	Title	Directed by	Written by	Original release date	UK viewers (million)
Autumn Term
101	"Episode 1"	Andrew Gunn	Philip Dodds	4 May 2011	5.67
A new term at Waterloo Road gets off to a noisy start when Karen arrives to discover the alarm going off and her new site manager, Rob Scotcher, taking a laid-back approach to the problem. Rob is accompanied to the school by his son, Aiden, who immediately catches the eye of Jess. However, it seems she's not the only one interested in him. When a Year 12 pupil abandons and then claims her baby, Karen is concerned for the girl, her child and the dark secret she's keeping. New teachers Eleanor Chaudry and Daniel Chalk want to make a good impression, but the kids aren't going to give them an easy ride. "Chalky" is instantly marked out as a soft target, while Ms Chaudry's strict rules land Sambuca Kelly in the cooler. What Eleanor sees as unruly behaviour in Sambuca is just a personality clash according to Tom, but her erratic behaviour gives cause for concern. Note: First appearance of Eleanor Chaudry, Rhona and Shona Mansfield, Rob and Aiden Scotcher, and Daniel Chalk.
102	"Episode 2"	Andrew Gunn	Liz Lake	11 May 2011	6.01
Year 12 pupil Martin Dunbar is branded a pervert by his classmates when he's caught poring over a lingerie magazine and creeping around the girls' changing rooms. Josh tries to help in the face of aggression by Finn and Chris thinks something's not right. While Karen thinks it is typical teenage behaviour, the truth is more complicated. Sambuca and her mum have to face a harsh reality when they discover what's been causing her recent headaches. While neither is ready to admit to anyone else what's going on, Sambuca finds a confidante in an unlikely place. Note: Rose Kelly returns.
103	"Episode 3"	Jill Robertson	Katie Douglas	18 May 2011	5.87
When Amy discovers she has a stalker she feels like a celebrity – but the novelty soon wears off as things get personal and she decides to take her own revenge. But when Eleanor reveals who the stalker is, her handling of the situation gives Karen grounds for concern – and an irate parent in her office. Meanwhile, the sixth formers turn the cameras on themselves for their English project and, while Ronan uses his film to show Vicki his real feelings, Finn and Josh get into trouble over their action-packed film-making.
104	"Episode 4"	Jill Robertson	Chris Murray	25 May 2011	6.12
When new girl Evie Prior arrives at Waterloo Road, something about her story doesn't quite add up. It is not long before she is upsetting her classmates and causing problems for Karen. Evie tries to empathise with Finn, who's devastated by girlfriend Sambuca's terminal illness. But when Evie's story unravels and the truth is revealed, the school is forced to deal with the fallout. Meanwhile, it is appraisal time for the overconfident Eleanor and the nervous Daniel Chalk. Karen sits in on their classes and finds room for improvement for both teachers. But has she got it in for Ms Chaudry? After school, Karen and Rob go on a date, with a happy outcome overshadowed dramatically by the return of Rob's ex-wife. Note: First appearance of Naomi Scotcher.
105	"Episode 5"	Julie Edwards	Carol Ann Docherty & Aileen Goss	1 June 2011	4.59
It is launch day for Karen's new community café and she's invited the Director of Education along. But with nervous teacher Daniel Chalk in charge, will the café be ready in time? Twins Shona and Rhona are acting up in class, because they're caught in the middle of a bitter custody battle between their mum and gran. As the court makes its decision, the twins' gran takes matters into her own hands, with a stunt that could jeopardise the café launch. Elsewhere, Jess discovers Aiden and Vicki's deception. Does this mean it is the end for Aiden and Jess's relationship.
106	"Episode 6"	Julie Edwards	Liz Lake	8 June 2011	6.20
Sambuca is keen to see her father Reynold, before she dies, and secretly enlists the help of Lauren and Finn travels to Blackpool. But when she most needs someone to rely on, will Sam be disappointed? After a run of bad publicity, Karen is keen to promote a positive image of Waterloo Road and hires PR woman Linda Wickes to put a positive spin on things. Will Karen recognise her school after Linda's given it a makeover? And when Richard Whitman, the Director of Education, arrives unannounced, he makes no secret of his disapproval of both the PR launch and Karen's professionalism. Note: Final appearance of Sambuca Kelly.
107	"Episode 7"	Joss Agnew	Julie Dixon	15 June 2011	5.96
Exam fever hits the sixth form and, with Richard Whitman on a personal vendetta to close Waterloo Road, there's a lot riding on the exams going well. But things do not get off to a smooth start: Vicki's got more than exam nerves to deal with – she's discovered she's pregnant with Aiden's child. But his solution to Vicki's dilemma causes more problems than it solves, as Ronan takes the blame for their rash actions. It is the day of Sambuca's memorial service and everyone's on edge. As Finn empties Sam's locker Lauren and Amy help him to appreciate the sentimental value of the little things that are left behind. At the memorial service Denzil struggles with his grief, especially when new girl Scout inadvertently steals Sam's jumper, while Jess makes her own shock admission. Note: First appearance of Jodie 'Scout' Allen. Final appearance of Rose Kelly and Naomi Scotcher.
108	"Episode 8"	Joss Agnew	Davey Jones	22 June 2011	5.88
Karen starts to doubt Chris's judgement when he tries to help newcomer Scout. She's unwashed, hungry and sleeping in class, and when Chris finds out that she's working as a drug courier he steps in to rescue her from her feckless family. But he finds himself in trouble both with Karen and the police as he tries to do right by Scout. The staff worry about redundancies as a warning notice is served on Waterloo Road, but Karen assures them she intends to appeal against it. With Eleanor Chaudry still spying on the school, Richard Whitman has plenty of inside knowledge that could help him close down the school.
109	"Episode 9"	Brian Kelly	David McManus	29 June 2011	5.92
It is decision day at Waterloo Road as the staff nervously await the Local Authority's decision on whether to close the school. Pressure grows on Eleanor as she realises the consequences of her actions and Karen discovers her duplicity. Meanwhile, Chris stirs up some healthy competition between the staff and Year 10s as they pull on their wellies to help with a community garden project. But he's quickly sucked back in to dealing with Scout's dysfunctional life as her mum leaves her and brother Liam home alone.
110	"Episode 10"	Brian Kelly	Nick Hoare	6 July 2011	6.04
The whole school gears up to face an independent inspection. But when the inspector discovers that Chris has allowed a pupil (Scout) to spend the night at his house, it is Karen's job that's on the line. As the staff do their best to rally round, Jess issues Eleanor with an ultimatum: if she really wants to save Waterloo Road, she needs to take action. With Scout and her brother Liam's mum still missing they face being taken into care. Scout takes matters into her own hands and decides to run away. But with the police, Chris and a drug dealer in pursuit, it is not going to be easy. Karen is fired and she leaves Waterloo Road with children Harry Fisher and Jess Fisher. Chris Mead also leaves and Aiden and Rob Scotcher leave, but at the end Jess lets Aiden become part of their child's life and they leave to pursue a relationship together Note: Final appearance of Christopher "Chris" Mead, Amy Porter, Karen, Jess and Harry Fisher, Rob and Aiden Scotcher, Eleanor Chaudry and Kyle Stack (until episode 21).
Spring Term
111	"Episode 11"	Andrew Gunn	Davey Jones	14 September 2011	5.35
New headteacher Michael Byrne arrives at Waterloo Road with big ambitions to improve the school, bringing with him a team of high-achieving teachers including newly-weds Jez and Sian Diamond and former Waterloo Road teacher Matt Wilding. Left scarred by a pupil's knife attack at his last school, the new head is called to court to hear the verdict of the trial. Elsewhere, Phoenix and Harley Taylor struggle to hide the death of their nan and Finn begins to show an interest in newcomer Trudi, sister of the nearby estate's ringleader Tariq Siddiqui. Norte: First appearance of Michael Byrne, Phoenix and Harley Taylor, Sian and Jez Diamond, Wayne Johnson, Tariq and Trudi Siddiqui, and Nelson Smith. Matt Wilding returns.
112	"Episode 12"	Andrew Gunn	Ann McManus & Eileen Gallagher	21 September 2011	4.24
Jez and Sian plan a dinner party for the staff, but are shocked when Jez's estranged children arrive. At the school, Michael clashes with Grantly and Matt and Scout bond over guitar lessons. Michael also attempts to reunite the Taylors with their father, and Vicki decides to re-take her science A-Levels. First appearance of Madi and Zack Diamond.
113	"Episode 13"	Julie Edwards	Jake Riddell	28 September 2011	5.02
New Head of English Linda Radleigh arrives at Waterloo Road to Grantly's fury. Tasked with keeping an eye on Emily while her sister Lindsay is released from prison, she soon faces difficulties. Meanwhile, Chalky tries to impress Janeece by signing up to Jez's Fit Club, and Michael spends time with Sian. Note: First appearance of Linda Radleigh.
114	"Episode 14"	Julie Edwards	David McManus	5 October 2011	4.50
It is the day of Waterloo Road's rugby clash with St Mary's and Jez, under pressure to deliver the morale-boosting victory that he's promised Michael, enlists the help of combative ex-pro Ken Watling. When Ken orders that Zack be dropped from the team, Jez reluctantly agrees. Meanwhile, between a stressed-out Vicki and Ronan and Vicki injuring herself, Sian becomes suspicious that Ronan is hitting Vicki. Meanwhile, Phoenix, is over the moon when Nelson presents him with a moped for his birthday, and later that night professional boundaries are crossed for Linda and Michael when she makes him an indecent proposal.
115	"Episode 15"	Reza Moardi	Jess Williams	12 October 2011	4.60
Matt has organised a special orchestra project and is irked when Michael insists that Tariq is included. Michael himself is trying to keep his distance from Linda and is troubled when Sian accepts Linda's help to input the grades. His instinct proves correct when Linda confesses to Sian about their tryst, but Sian's reaction to the news provokes unexpected consequences that could have serious implications for her marriage. Michael's world is rocked even further by the sudden arrival of Wayne. Meanwhile, Scout is over the moon when Mia, a mid-twenties MS sufferer, offers her the position as a live-in carer, but Em's recklessness threatens to jeopardise everything.
116	"Episode 16"	Reza Moardi	Ben Ockrent	19 October 2011	5.31
When Madi is mugged on the way into school, an enraged Jez responds by starting boxing classes, but these prove short-lived after Zack floors Harley and Michael intervenes. Tariq, meanwhile, has been tasked with recruiting prefects, but Michael changes tack after seeing Tariq's ju-jitsu moves on Jez, instructing him to lead self-defence classes instead. In a rare moment of mutual understanding Tariq confesses to Finn that he was bullied while he was in the young offenders unit, but the pair's new friendship doesn't last long when Tariq discovers the truth about Finn and Trudi's relationship. Meanwhile, Michael is under pressure after concealing the CCTV footage of his altercation with Wayne, and Linda's wayward pet rabbit, Roger, causes mayhem when it is set loose in the school.
117	"Episode 17"	Alex Kalymnios	Chris Murray	26 October 2011	4.49
Michael is appreciative of Sian's support when a newspaper article announces his salary. He then confides in her about his house being broken into, but is alarmed when footage of his fight with Wayne is emailed to him anonymously. Meanwhile, Tom is irked when he learns that a teaching assistant, Greg, has been brought in by Linda to help him. When Greg's background and knowledge of English literature doesn't quite ring true, a suspicious Tariq lays a trap for him.
118	"Episode 18"	Alex Kalymnios	Philip Gawthorne	2 November 2011	5.56
Margaret Harker, the wife of a local entrepreneur, is visiting the school to consider if she should make a sizeable donation to Waterloo Road. However, Michael finds it hard to keep focused when he discovers that it is Phoenix who has been emailing him the footage of him leaving an injured Wayne on the roadside. When a panicked Sian tells Michael that Linda knows about their affair, he struggles to keep up his professional façade in front of the important visitor. New pupil Freddie is hoping to make a full recovery after his heart transplant but his enthusiasm about being back in mainstream school makes him an easy target in class and he brushes up against Denzil and Phoenix who think he's a little "freak". Meanwhile, Scout and Emily's rebellious behaviour continues and they both get matching tattoos. Ronan and Finn try to mend their broken hearts by planning to get some girls at Phoenix's house party, but this goes wrong when Finn gets drunk and embarrasses himself in front of Trudi. Chalky has more luck in love when Linda, jealous of Michael and Sian, agrees to go on a date with him. After an awkward start, they end up having a fun night.
119	"Episode 19"	Fraser MacDonald	Muirinn Lane Kelly	9 November 2011	5.41
Waterloo Road welcomes Viv O'Donnell, a local radio DJ, who has arrived to host her live radio show at the school. Everyone's excited about having a masterclass in radio journalism from a chat show supremo; everyone, that is, except her daughter Andi, a loner in Scout and Emily's class, who shies away from her mum's limelight. Sian and Michael wake up late, having spent the night together in a hotel. Jez, meanwhile, is trying to move past his suspicions but he steals Sian's car keys to check her GPS, only to discover that she has lied about her whereabouts and had really been at a hotel. He confronts Sian, who breaks down with guilt and confesses to the affair. Trudi gets a raw deal from Finn when it accidentally comes out that her dad has marriage plans for her with a family friend. And Tariq comes to Chalky's aid when he burns his surprise dinner for Linda.
120	"Episode 20"	Fraser MacDonald	Nick Hoare	16 November 2011	4.88
The last day of term starts badly for Michael when he finds a threatening note on the dashboard of his car. Meanwhile, Jez's unexpected arrival during the staff briefing scuppers any hope that the prize-giving will be the focus of the day. Grantly informs a rattled Michael that Jez will be making a formal complaint to the governors about his affair with Sian and matters come to a head when Jez pulls Madi and Zack out of class to take them to Ireland. As they drive off, Wayne slips into school with revenge on his mind and Michael finally gets a chance to confront his stalker. Elsewhere, Emily tries desperately to prevent Scout from moving away with her foster parents and Ronan and Vicki say goodbye to Waterloo Road. In the final moments of the episode, Michael is run over by Linda. As she gets out of the car, she tells him, "It's over Michael. We could have been so good together." Note: Final appearance of Vicki MacDonald, Wayne Johnson and Ronan Burley (until episode 30).
Summer Term
121	"Episode 21"	Jonathan Fox Bassett	Jake Riddell	22 February 2012	5.50
Following Michael's hit-and-run, Jez is the prime suspect. However, after Chalky's suspicions are aroused Linda finds herself under scrutiny. Meanwhile, Sian is acting headteacher and faces the infiltration of new gang the DSC. DSC member Mason Price threatens Tariq's fresh start as the gang targets Finn, and Grantly criticises the work of dinner lady Maggie Croft, but also learns how to make easy money. Note: First Appearance of Naseem Siddiqui and Maggie Croft. Final Appearance of Linda Radleigh. Kyle Stack returns.
122	"Episode 22"	Jonathan Fox Bassett	Davey Jones	29 February 2012	4.77
Hoping to start a career in modelling, Lauren attempts to raise money for surgery. Michael is impressed when Trudi protests against his anti-gang measures, Tom tackles Josh's problem with drugs and Matt faces fatherhood sooner than expected.
123	"Episode 23"	Daikin Marsh	Simon J Ashford	7 March 2012	5.18
Josh's promise to quit drugs for good is tested when his charismatic dealer Grady gets in touch and his drug problem starts to spiral out of control. Tom is tasked with overseeing the selection process for the new Head of English. Candidate, Nikki's disciplinarian approach gets results, but Tom takes offence when she offers him some words of advice about Josh. When Nikki later chases down Grady, Tom offers her the role. Meanwhile, it's touch and go for Matt's baby daughter Martha, and Grantly's at a loss when he mislays a large sum of money. Note: First appearance of Nikki Boston
124	"Episode 24"	Daikin Marsh	Sally Tatchell	14 March 2012	4.92
Zack is convinced that Jez is not his father and undertakes a DNA test to confirm his suspicions. Jez is devastated when he finds out, but discovers that he shares Zack's paternity anxieties. As they wait for the results, Jez takes the opportunity to tell Zack that he loves him no matter what and the pair are brought closer together. Meanwhile, when Josh's behaviour becomes increasingly erratic, Nikki urges Tom to seek professional help. Josh is referred to a psychiatrist by the GP, who explains to Tom that it could be schizophrenia. Elsewhere, Matt fears he could lose Martha when he learns that Rosie is moving away with Alex, Grantly and Maggie are left high and dry when the cosmetics company goes bust, while Trudi feels guilty when she forgets the anniversary of her mother's death
125	"Episode 25"	Steve Hughes	Matthew Evans	21 March 2012	5.21
Grantly is dismayed at Fleur's deteriorating health and, after some advice from Maggie, decides to take action. Fleeing Waterloo Road, he takes Fleur away from her nursing home to a cottage near where they honeymooned, in the hope it will jog her memory. A concerned Tom follows, but finds Grantly regretting his decision – he needs to accept that his wife has gone. Back at the nursing home, Grantly and Fleur share a tender moment before she slips away. Meanwhile, Trudi's world is plunged into crisis by the shock discovery that she's pregnant. Elsewhere, Nikki encourages Tom to be honest with Josh about his mental health issues. Note: Final appearance of Fleur Budgen.
126	"Episode 26"	Steve Hughes	Alanna Hallum	28 March 2012	4.97
It's the day of the school fun run and Jez's star athlete Mercedes has been training hard to impress him. After injuring herself on the run, she coaxes Jez into take her home and attempts to make a move on him. Jez's life starts to unravel as Sian later admits her true feelings about their relationship. Elsewhere, relationships are tense as Trudi makes a decision about Finn, while Craig declares his love for Janeece in front of everybody and asks her a life changing question. Meanwhile, Grantly returns to work, barely a week after the loss of his wife. Never ones to stay out of trouble, Kyle and Tariq get into an altercation with Eugene Garvey, leader of a rival gang of the DSC called the MSB (Murray Set Boyz), which almost leads to a fight at school. Michael and Chalky manage to break up the fight but they fear that they might have let a turf war onto the school. Note: First appearance of Eugene Garvey.
127	"Episode 27"	Paul Murphy	Chris Murray	4 April 2012	5.08
It is the start of exam season at Waterloo Road and Josh is struggling to cope with the workload. Without his medication, his mental health begins to spiral out of control. Josh becomes obsessed with an old plague pit underneath the school and when some of the girls play a trick on him, he starts to believe that spirits are trying to contact him. Soon, his behaviour starts to spiral out of control, and an ambulance is called. Meanwhile, it is the day of Janeece's wedding and nothing sees to be going right. The reception venue doesn't have a record of her booking and she cannot get hold of her fiancé Craig. Elsewhere, Jez moves out and Trudi is due to have her baby terminated but backs out on the idea and later has a miscarriage. The truth about Craig is soon revealed and he goes with Janeece's possessions. Meanwhile Kyle and Tariq's actions towards Finn make him turn to an unlikely source to get back at Tariq.
128	"Episode 28"	Paul Murphy	Chris Bucknall	11 April 2012	5.03
On the morning of her art exam, student Shelby is desperate for alcohol, having spilt her secret stash of vodka. She makes it to the exam, but without managing to get her fix, she struggles to concentrate. Knowing that she has failed, Shelby suggests to Madi that they go to the pub to celebrate Madi's 18th birthday. At the same time, Alan Dixon is at Waterloo Road to conduct a review for the Local Education Authority, but things aren't looking good for the school when he sees what state Shelby and Madi are in – Shelby is his daughter. Meanwhile, Jez realises he needs to prioritise his relationship with his children, and Kyle oversteps the line when he is caught selling illegal vodka shots, punching Nikki in the face and being permanently excluded. Elsewhere, Janeece is led to drastic measures as she struggles financially, Finn falls further under the influence of the murray set spray painting a MSB tag outside of Tariq's house, and a former pupil of Michael's arrives with a very interesting offer, and Finn leaves the school in anger so he can be with Eugene and the gang. Note: First appearance of Lorraine Donnegan. Final appearance of Jez Diamond.
129	"Episode 29"	Dermot Boyd	Davey Jones	18 April 2012	5.25
At school, Scout becomes jealous when Danilo flirts with Em, and calls the wedding off. Later, Danilo convinces Scout that he does like her and he thought she didn't like him. Scout decides to go ahead with the marriage, even though Phoenix tries to persuade her not to. When Danilo fails to show up to football practice, Phoenix lets slip to Tom about the marriage and it is a race against time to find the happy couple. Meanwhile, Finn takes advantage of Kyle's expulsion and is caught committing an act of retaliation on Tariq's gang, while the violence between rival gangs the Dale Sken Crew and the Murray Set Boyz intensies. Michael is forced to install extra security measures at the school due to the escalating gang violence. But when the funding is cut and he approaches the LEA to find out why, he discovers the future of the school is under threat. Elsewhere, Lorraine continues to chase Michael about her job offer, Zack struggles with his identity now that his father has gone, and Maggie and Grantly take their relationship to the next level.
130	"Episode 30"	Dermot Boyd	Jake Riddell	25 April 2012	5.46
The final day dawns on Waterloo Road in Rochdale as Michael arrives to break the news of the school's imminent closure. Pondering the future of the pupils, he discovers that not all of them have received a place at alternative local schools. Reeling from the realisation, Michael tackles the possibility of taking a handful of students with them and asks Lorraine to consider setting up a boarding house at the new school. Elsewhere, Josh returns to school and quickly learns of Finn's recent involvement in the gang trouble. His worries soon escalate when Eugene and the MSB invade the school to teach Finn a lesson, while Tariq receives a crossbow in the post to which he discovers Kyle has ordered as part of his own revenge against plot. As the school prom gets underway, it's a race against time to stop Kyle. As Tariq realises the error of his ways, he warns the prom goers of the crossbow just as Kyle takes aim – and Josh arrives to save Finn. Meanwhile Finn and Trudi get back together and Janeece receives a surprising offer. Later, as the school's conversion into new, luxury apartments gets underway, both staff and students considering the move take a trip to Scotland to visit the new school. During a stop-off at the border, the group revel as Grantly proposes to Maggie – just as an out-of-control lorry hurtles towards them. Note: Final appearance of Matt Wilding, Finn Sharkey, Emily James, Lauren Andrews, Denzil Kelly, Rhona and Shona Mansfield, Trudi and Naseem Siddiqui, Zack Diamond, Eugene Garvey, Kyle Stack, Madi Diamond and Nikki Boston (all three of them until Series 8). Return and final appearance of Ronan Burley.

== DVD release ==
Four box sets of the seventh series have been released. Episodes 1-10 (Autumn Term) of the series were released on 17 October 2011,. Episodes 11-20 (Spring Term) were released on 26 March 2012. Episodes 21-30 (Summer Term) were released on 10 September 2012. All episodes in one boxset were released on 8 April 2013. They were released with a "12" British Board of Film Classification (BBFC) certificate (meaning it is unsuitable for viewing by those under the age of 12 years).
