= Cilla The Musical =

Musical written by Jeff Pope

Cilla
- The Musical
- Original UK tour poster
- Music: Various
- Lyrics: Various
- Book: Jeff Pope
- Basis: The life and music of Cilla Black and Cilla (2014 TV series) by Jeff Pope
- Premiere: 1 September 2017: Liverpool Empire Theatre
- Productions: 2017 UK tour

Cilla The Musical is a jukebox musical written by Jeff Pope based on the early career and music of Cilla Black and Pope's 2014 ITV drama biopic of the same name.

== Production ==
=== Original UK tour (2017–18) ===
Produced by Bill Kenwright and Laurie Mansfield, the production opened at the Liverpool Empire Theatre from 7 September 2017 before touring the UK, starring Kara Lilly Hayworth as Cilla and Andrew Lancel as Brian Epstein. The production was directed by Kenwright and Bob Tomson, choreographed by Carole Todd, set and costume designed by Gary McCann, lighting designed by Nick Richings, sound designed by Dan Samson, wigs designed by Richard Mawbey, with Scott Alder as musical director and Gary Hickeson as musical producer and orchestral arrangement.

The production was scheduled to begin another from September 2020 at the Liverpool Empire Theatre, starring Sheridan Smith reprising her role as Cilla from the TV series, however it was cancelled due to the COVID-19 pandemic. On 29 November 2020 at the Royal Variety Performance, Smith performed "Anyone Who Had A Heart" and "You're My World" from the musical, opposite Andrew Lancel who was due to reprise the role of Brian Epstein.

== Musical numbers ==
- "Anyone Who Had a Heart"
- "Alfie"
- "Something Tells Me (Something's Gonna Happen Tonight)"
- "Twist and Shout"
- "California Dreamin'"
- "You're My World"

== Cast and characters ==
Character	2017 UK tour
Cilla Black	Kara Lilly Hayworth
Bobby	Carl Au
Brian Epstein	Andrew Lancel
Big Cilla	Jayne Ashley
John White	Neil MacDonald
Johnny Hutchinson	Tom Dunlea
Pat	Billie Hardy
Rose Willis	Harriette Mullen
Pauline	Gemma Brodrick-Bower
Ringo Starr	Bill Caple
Paul McCartney / Denny Doherty	Joe Etherington
Kenny Willis	Tom Christian
John Lennon	Michael Hawkins
Gerry Marsden	Alan Howell
Adrian Barber / John Phillips	Jay Osborne
George Harrison	Alex Harford
Daniel	Gary Mitchinson
Beryl / Swing	Chloe Edwards-Wood
George Martin	Tom Sowinski
John Gustafson	Christopher Weeks
