= Carl Au =

British actor (born 1987)

- Born: 24 March 1987 (age 39); Kirkby, Merseyside, England
- Occupations: Actor; dancer; singer
- Years active: 1998–present

Carl Au (born 24 March 1987) is an English actor, dancer, and singer. He began his career as a child actor before receiving a scholarship to the Arts Educational School (ArtsEd), where he was awarded the inaugural Stephen Sondheim Society Prize. After graduating, Au returned to stage productions, primarily in the West End of London.

On television, Au made his debut as Barry Barry in the BBC drama Waterloo Road (2013–2014). He subsequently appeared in the plays Bright Phoenix, Ostrich Boys, and High Fidelity, as well as being cast in a lead role in the 2017–2018 touring production of Cilla The Musical. Au released his first single "Uncle" in November 2020.

== Early life ==
Au was born on 24 March 1987, in Kirkby, Merseyside. He has British, Chinese and Irish heritage. Au received scholarships to three musical theatre colleges to study acting and musical theatre. Philip Key of the Daily Post called this "an unprecedented event in show business". He opted to study at the Arts Educational Schools, London, where he graduated in 2008.

== Career ==
Au began his stage career aged eleven. As a teenager, he appeared in Copperfield, a musical based on Dickens’ David Copperfield. He also appeared as young Benny in the stage production of Her Benny at the Liverpool Empire Theatre. In August 2005, he starred in the futuristic musical Lorenzo's Quest as protagonist Lorenzo. The actor featured in the 2006–2007 pantomime of Robin Hood and The Babes in the Wood at the Bournemouth Pavilion with three of his fellow Arts Educational College classmates. The run consisted of 48 performances and for the majority of the run, the actor was ill; nevertheless, he appeared in all the performances. In 2007, Au was invited to feature in the Barbara Cook and Friends charity gala show, organised for Barbara Cook's eightieth birthday. He dubbed it a "remarkable experience". From June to August 2008, Au appeared in the ensemble of High School Musical on Stage! for its London premiere at the Hammersmith Apollo. Later that year, he appeared in the Oxford Playhouse's 2008–2009 pantomime Sleeping Beauty. He went on to appear at the 2009 Brit Awards as one of the Pet Shop Boys dancers and has also performed with Lady Gaga.

The actor played the role of Nephew Fred in the 2009 production of A Christmas Carol at the Birmingham Repertory Theatre. In March 2010, Au's casting as the mute in The Fantasticks was announced; the production began in the West End in May. Between September and October 2010, Au appeared in the West End production of Bells Are Ringing at the Union Theatre, London; he portrayed Carl. In December 2010, it was announced that Au would join the West End cast of Jersey Boys as Joe Pesci, from 15 March 2011. At the Freedom Bar in London, the actor joined other West End actors in a one-night showcase of composer David Are songs, Slip Into Your Skin, on 18 March 2012.

In 2012, Au was cast in the BBC school drama Waterloo Road as troublesome student Barry Barry. The character was introduced as part of a family headed by accredited actress Zöe Lucker. The role marks Au's first television credit. After appearing in two series, Au departed the drama and filmed his final scenes in October 2013. Daily Mirror's Clemmie Moodie praised Au's performance in Waterloo Road, opining that he managed to "effortlessly nail [his] delivery every time". The actor received a fanbase from his time on the drama and his fans continued to watch his stage roles. In February 2013, Au appeared in the Let's Dance For Comic Relief competition alongside four of his Waterloo Road co-stars. They performed a Spice Girls number dressed as the girl group; Au performed as Melanie C, which he was pleased with as he was the only performer who did not wear high heels. The actor told Kate Forrester of the Liverpool Echo that he relished the chance to "dance, sing and act all at the [same] time".

After leaving Waterloo Road, Au moved to London where he moved into a flat with friends. Shortly after, he auditioned for the lead, Alan 'Icarus' Flynn, in the play Bright Phoenix at the Everyman Theatre, Liverpool. The play ran throughout October 2014. Au enjoyed returning to theatre as he liked "the adrenaline that you can get from the audience". Au guest-starred in an episode of BBC medical drama Casualty in September 2014, and the following year, he appeared in an episode of Doctors as anxiety sufferer Karl Moran. In 2016, Au was cast in the Till Death Us Do Part episode of The Lost Sitcoms series. He was delighted to be cast as his late grandfather was a fan of the sitcom. That same year, the actor appeared in the Belgrade Theatre's production of Ostrich Boys. George Attwell of The Stage called the actor's performance "cartoonish yet consistently funny". Au was cast as Bobby in the 2017 touring production of Cilla The Musical, a biopic musical about the early career and music of Cilla Black. In September 2019, it was announced that Au would star as Dick in the UK premiere of the musical High Fidelity at the Turbine Theatre, running between October and December 2019.

Au released his debut single, "Uncle", on 1 November 2020, under the stage name Au. He announced the single two days prior to its release on his social media accounts. It is about him learning that he is about to be an uncle, and was released on his nephew's due date. In November 2023, Au guest starred in another episode of Doctors, now portraying Josh Harker.

== Filmography ==
=== Television ===
Year	Title	Role	Notes	Ref(s)
2013–2014	Waterloo Road	Barry Barry	Regular role	
2013	Let's Dance For Comic Relief	Melanie C		
2014	Casualty	Danny Smith	Guest role	
2015	Doctors	Karl Moran	Guest role	
2016	The Lost Sitcoms	Mike Rawlins	Till Death Us Do Part special	
2023	Doctors	Josh Harker	Guest role	

=== Stage ===
Year	Production	Role	Location	Ref(s)
Unknown	Copperfield	Unknown	Unknown	
2002	Her Benny	Young Benny	Liverpool Empire Theatre	
2005	Lorenzo's Quest	Lorenzo	Crosby Civic Hall	
2006–2007	Robin Hood and The Babes in the Wood	Unknown	Bournemouth Pavilion	
2008	High School Musical on Stage!	Ensemble	Hammersmith Apollo	
2008–2009	Sleeping Beauty	Ensemble	Oxford Playhouse	
2009	A Christmas Carol	Nephew Fred	Birmingham Repertory Theatre	
2010	The Fantasticks	The mute	The Duchess Theatre	
2010	Bells Are Ringing	Carl	Union Theatre, London	
2011	Jersey Boys	Joe Pesci	Prince Edward Theatre	
2012	Slip Into Your Skin	Himself	Freedom Bar, London	
2014	Bright Phoenix	Alan 'Icarus' Flynn	Everyman Theatre, Liverpool	
2016	Ostrich Boys	Sim	Belgrade Theatre	
2017–2018	Cilla The Musical	Bobby	Touring production	
2019	High Fidelity	Dick	Turbine Theatre	

== Discography ==
=== As lead artist ===
Title	Year	Album	Ref(s)
"Uncle"	2020	Non-album single	

== Awards and nominations ==
Year	Association	Category	Result	Ref(s)
2007	The Stephen Sondheim Society	The Stephen Sondheim Society Prize for Student Performer of the Year	Won	
