= Philip Martin Brown =

English actor

- Born: 9 July 1956 (age 69); Manchester, Lancashire, England
- Occupation: Actor
- Years active: 1978–present
- Known for: Wing and a Prayer; City Central; Casualty; Doctors; Coronation Street; Waterloo Road; Death Comes to Pemberley; The Worst Witch
- Spouse: Pip Brown
- Children: 2

Philip Martin Brown (born 9 July 1956) is an English actor. He is known for his portrayal of English teacher Grantly Budgen in the BBC One drama series Waterloo Road, which he played from 2006 to 2013. He is also known for playing Steve McDonald's therapist in the ITV soap opera Coronation Street in 2015, although he first appeared in the show as D.I. Pinnock in 2005. In 2021, Brown appeared in the BBC One medical soap opera Doctors as Marvin Bulis, having previously played various other roles in the show.

== Career ==
From March 2006 to October 2013, Brown appeared as English teacher Grantly Budgen in the first nine series of the BBC One school-based drama series Waterloo Road. He was the longest serving cast member on the show and featured in 154 episodes in total. He has also worked on The Professionals, Cutting It and The Bill, where he appeared in ten episodes as Seth Mercer, and has made appearances in many other British dramas, including Heartbeat, Midsomer Murders, Hetty Wainthropp Investigates, New Tricks and Doctors.

Brown's most prominent role in a drama before Waterloo Road was Eddie Vincent in Casualty, where he appeared in 17 episodes between 2002 and 2003. He also played John Adams in the 1984 film The Bounty and appeared in Sharpes Justice in 1997. He played a detective in the second episode of the ITV drama Rosemary & Thyme. He also appeared in a Skins online episode in 2012 as a drug dealer. Brown left Waterloo Road during the autumn term of Series 9. He appeared briefly in the 1999 film Sleepy Hollow starring Johnny Depp. In January 2015, he appeared in Coronation Street as Steve McDonald's (Simon Gregson) therapist. He appeared in the CBBC series The Worst Witch in 2017, playing the role of Algernon Rowan-Webb.

== Filmography ==
=== Film ===
Year	Title	Role	Notes
1981	Eye of the Needle	Billy Parkin	
1983	Party Party	Tony	
1984	The Bounty	John Adams	
1985	Coming Through	David	
1997	Bring Me the Head of Mavis Davis	Inspector Furse	
1999	Sleepy Hollow	Constable One	
2001	Dream	Martin	
2006	Irish Jam	Danny	
2011	Tinker Tailor Soldier Spy	Tufty Thesinger	
2012	Tezz	Police Chief Alan	
2012	Strawberry Fields	Bob	
2017	Darkest Hour	Sawyers	
2018	Peterloo	Angry Citizen	
2023	Christmas at the Holly Day Inn	Larry	
2024	Frankenstein: Legacy	Robert Browning / Creature	

=== Television ===
Year	Title	Role	Notes
1978	A Horseman Riding By	Sam Potter	Main role; 7 episodes
1979	Crown Court	Bernard Caplan	Episode: "Boys Will Be Boys"
1980	Enemy at the Door	Private Hoskins	Episode: "The Raid"
1980	Bull Week	Eddie Kowal	TV mini-series; all 6 episodes
1980	Him and His Magic	Stanley	Television short
1981	BBC2 Playhouse	Miles	Episode: "A Last Visitor for Mr. Hugh Peter"
1981	Chronicle	Lt. Beattie	Episode: "The Crime of Captain Colhurst"
1981	Keep It in the Family	Mr. Wilkins	Episode: "The Inferior Decorator"
1982	Juliet Bravo	Billy Read	Episode: "Betrayals"
1983	The Professionals	Cook	Episode: "No Stone"
1983	Jemima Shore Investigates	Clive Gartrell	Episode: "A Model Murder"
1986	Bluebell	Sam Smith	Series 1: Episode 1
1986	The Monocled Mutineer	Turner	Episode: "A Dead Man On Leave"
1987	Indelible Evidence	Andrew Boulden	Episode: "Process Of Elimination"
1987	Floodtide	Special Branch Man	Episode: "One: The Call"
1987	1914 All Out	Jack Fairbrother	Television film
1987	A Perfect Spy	Kaufmann	Series 1: Episode 3
1988	Coming Through	David	Television film
1988	All Creatures Great and Small	Jack Scott	2 episodes
1989	The Paradise Club	Peter Noonan	Main role; 5 episodes
1990	Chain	Jobelin	Episode: "Miss. Brinkwell"
1990	Die Kinder	Norris	Episode: "Direct Action"
1991	EastEnders	Sergeant Jimmy Buckwell	Episode #1.644
1991	The Sharp End	Andy Barras	TV mini-series; all 8 episodes
1992	El C.I.D.	Keith Smith	Episode: "The Lone Stranger"
1992	Medics	Charles Davies	Series 2: Episode 3
1992	The Young Indiana Jones Chronicles	Guard	Episode: "Germany, Mid-August 1916"
1992	Boon	Maurice	Episode: "Love Or Money"
1992	Birds of a Feather	M.C.	Episode: "Okey-Cokey-Karaoke"
1993	Minder	Pike	Episode: "No Way to Treat a Daley"
1993	The Bill	Senior Prison Officer	Episode: "Insider Dealing"
1993	Heartbeat	Jack Scarman	Episode: "Dead Ringer"
1993	Between the Lines	Mick Furness	Episode: "Manoeuvre 11"
1994	Peak Practice	Colin Meadows	Episode: "In Good Faith"
1994	Murder Most Horrid	Psycho	Episode: "Smashing Bird"
1994	The Lifeboat	Colin Hicks	Episode: "The Birdman"
1995	The Bill	Jack Spellman	Episode: "Life's a Bitch"
1995	Band of Gold	Mr. Moore	3 episodes
1995	Men of the World	John	Episode: "Happy Birthday Kendle"
1995	Coogan's Run	PC Ted Cromwell	2 episodes
1996	Pie in the Sky	Chief Inspector Kendon	Episode: "Devils on Horseback"
1997	The Bill	Ray Kingsley	Episode: "No Claims Bonus"
1997	Sharpe's Justice	Saunders	Television film
1997	Screen One	Cook	Episode: "Hostile Waters"
1997–1998	Wing and a Prayer	John Daley	Main role; 14 episodes
1998	Hetty Wainthropp Investigates	Philip Hoskins	Episode: "Digging for Dirt"
1998–2000	City Central	Sgt. Paul Dobson	Regular role; 29 episodes
1999	Playing the Field	Bus Inspector	2 episodes
1999	The Bill	Jack Thompson	Episode: "Taxed"
2001	Where the Heart Is	Bob Young	Episode: "Sanctuary"
2002	Cutting It	Smedley	Main role; 5 episodes
2002	The Bill	Colin Greenstead	Episode: "Playing Runaway"
2002–2003	Casualty	Eddie Vincent	Regular role; 17 episodes
2003	Rosemary & Thyme	D.I. Trelawney	Episode: "Arabica and the Early Spider"
2003	Blue Dove	Andy Brennan	TV mini-series
2004	Murder in Suburbia	Tim Gregson	Episode: "Sanctuary"
2004	New Tricks	Rick Brewer	Episode: "Home Truths"
2004	Murphy's Law	John Franklin	Episode: "Convent"
2004	Foyle's War	Andrew Neame	Episode: "They Fought in the Fields"
2004	Midsomer Murders	John Whittle	Episode: "Things That Go Bump in the Night"
2005	Doctors	Pat Bolton	Episode: "Little Lies"
2005	Down to Earth	Trevor	Episode: "Broken Dreams"
2005	The Royal	Thomas Copley	Episode: "Say a Little Prayer"
2005	Coronation Street	D.I. Pinnock	Recurring role; 8 episodes
2005–2006	The Bill	Seth Mercer	6 episodes
2006–2013	Waterloo Road	Grantly Budgen	Regular role (series 1–9); 154 episodes
2006	A Harlot's Progress	Gaoler	Television film
2007	Heartbeat	Frank Jackson	Episode: "Out of Africa"
2008	Midsomer Murders	George Barkham	Episode: "Days of Misrule"
2008	Doctors	Harry Denver	Episode: "Stranger on a Bridge"
2011	Doctors	Eric Aspinall	Episode: "Men and Motors"
2013	Death Comes to Pemberley	Mr. Bidwell	TV mini-series; all 3 episodes
2013	Doctors	Keith Rooney	Episode: "Santa Ranter"
2014	Endeavour	Bernard Yelland	Episode: "Trove"
2015	Coronation Street	Therapist	2 episodes
2015	Vera	Stan Convile	Episode: "Old Wounds"
2016	Suspects	Ed Goddard	Episode: "The Enemy Within: Part 5"
2016	Doctors	'Grandie' Eddie Coulter	Episode: "Heartstrings"
2017–2019	The Worst Witch	Mr Algernon Rowan Webb	Regular role; 33 episodes
2018	Holby City	Richard Nash	Episode: "Belonging"
2018	Detroiters	Uncredited	Episode: "Lois"
2019	Doctors	Greg Milne	Episode: "The Getaway"
2020	Flack	Terry	Episode: "Brand Barron"
2021	Doctors	Marvin Bulis	Guest role
2023	Father Brown	John Mulch	Episode: "The Gardeners of Eden"
2024	Casualty	Bill Brook	"Episode 1362" (Internal Affairs - Episode 10)
2025	All Creatures Great and Small	Mr. Bolton	Episode: Captain Farnon?
2026	Call The Midwife	Edwin Robbins	Series 15: Episode 4

== Personal life and awards ==
He attended Barrow-in-Furness Grammar School for Boys. At the end of his fifth year, Brown was asked to leave the school, later stating that he was a "dreadful troublemaker". He lives in Paddock Wood, Kent, with his wife and family.

In 2010, Brown was nominated for the Best Actor prize in the 2010 TV Choice Awards, and won it three years in a row. Brown was diagnosed with epilepsy at the age of 19 and is now an ambassador for the charity Young Epilepsy.

He is an ex-epileptic and had to leave the stage until he underwent brain surgery which has left him seizure-free for 22 years.
