= Abby Mavers =

English actress

- Born: Liverpool, England
- Occupation: Actress
- Years active: 1997–present
- Notable work: Waterloo Road
- Relatives: Gary Mavers (father); Lee Mavers (uncle)

Abby Mavers is an English actress.

== Career ==
Mavers played Dynasty Barry in the BBC One school-based drama series Waterloo Road from 2013 until 2014.

== Filmography ==
Year	Title	Role	Notes	Ref(s)
1997	Peak Practice	Young Toni	TV series; Episode: "Borrowed Time"	
2010	Moving On	Toni	TV series; Episode: "Skies of Glass"	
2011	3 Mile Radius		Short film	
2013–2014	Waterloo Road	Dynasty Barry	Regular role; 41 episodes	
2015	The Sparticle Mystery	Bua	2 episodes	
2018	I Am Vengeance	Lucy	Feature film	
2026	The Cage	Kelly	4 episodes	

== Personal life ==
She is the daughter of actor Gary Mavers, and the niece of musician Lee Mavers, frontman of The La's. Mavers was in a relationship with her Waterloo Road co-star Tommy Knight for several years.
