= Under Milk Wood =

1954 radio drama by Dylan Thomas

Under Milk Wood is a 1954 radio drama by the Welsh poet Dylan Thomas. The BBC commissioned the play, which was later adapted for the stage. The first public reading was in New York City in 1953.

A film version of the same name, directed by Andrew Sinclair, was released in 1971. A second adaptation of the play, directed by Pip Broughton, was staged for television in 2014 for the 60th anniversary of the piece.

An omniscient narrator invites the audience to listen to the dreams and innermost thoughts of the inhabitants of the fictional small Welsh fishing town, Llareggub (buggerall spelt backwards).

They include Mrs. Ogmore-Pritchard, relentlessly nagging her two dead husbands; Captain Cat, reliving his seafaring times; the two Mrs. Dai Breads; Organ Morgan, obsessed with his music; and Polly Garter, pining for her dead lover. Later, the town awakens, and, aware now of how their feelings affect whatever they do, we watch them go about their daily business.

== Origins and development ==
=== Background ===
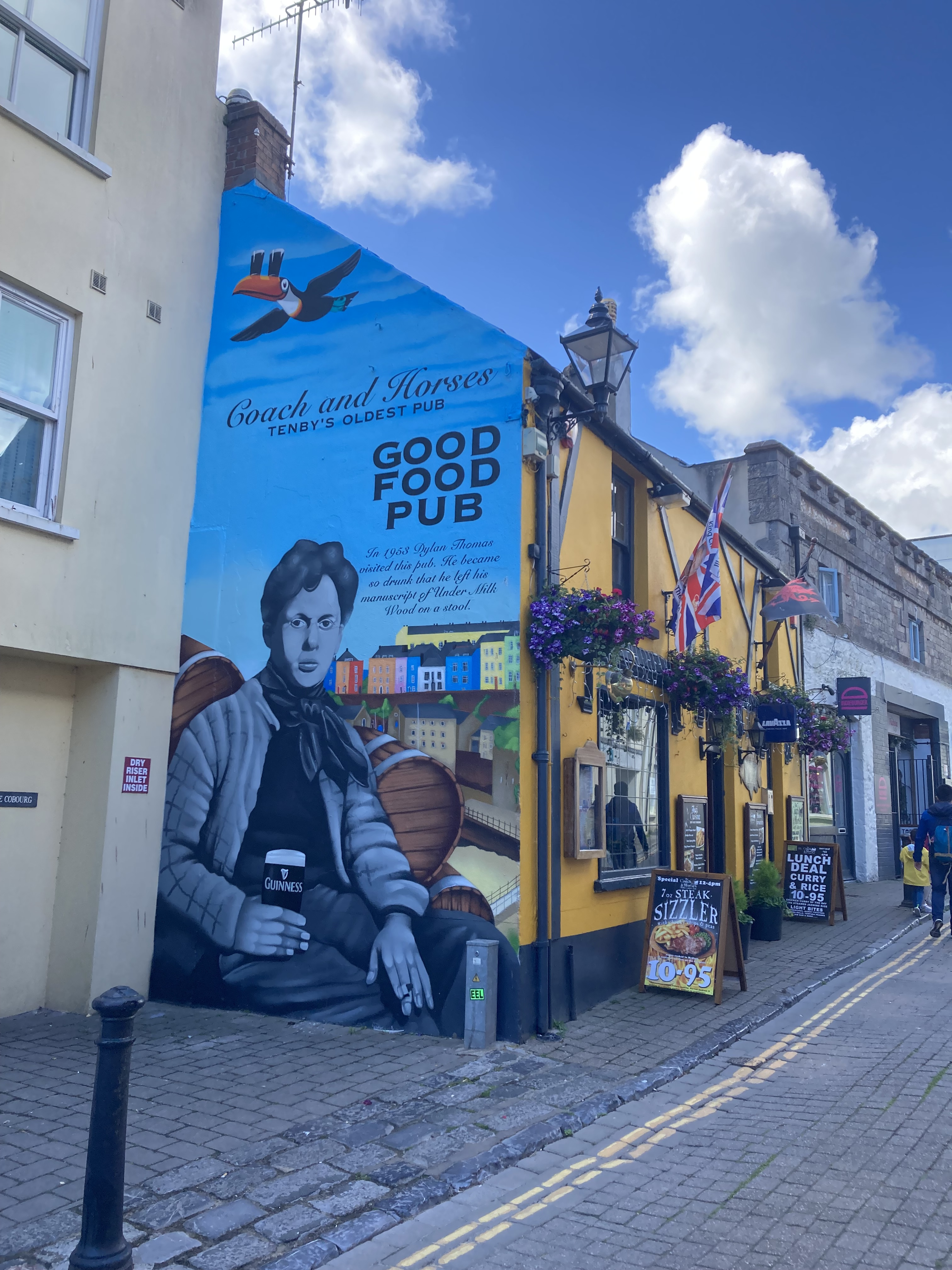
The Coach & Horses in Tenby, where Thomas is reputed to have been so drunk that he left his manuscript to Under Milk Wood on a stool

In 1931, the 17-year-old Thomas created a piece for the Swansea Grammar School magazine that included a conversation of Milk Wood stylings, between Mussolini and Wife, similar to those between Mrs. Ogmore-Pritchard and her two husbands that would later be found in Under Milk Wood.

In 1933, Thomas talked at length with his mentor and friend, Bert Trick, about creating a play about a Welsh town:

He read it to Nell and me in our bungalow at Caswell around the old Dover stove, with the paraffin lamps lit at night ... the story was then called Llareggub, which was a mythical village in South Wales, a typical village, with terraced houses with one ty bach to about five cottages and the various characters coming out and emptying the slops and exchanging greetings and so on; that was the germ of the idea which ... developed into Under Milk Wood.

In February 1937, Thomas outlined his plans for a Welsh Journey, following a route that would "be decided by what incidents arose, what people told me stories, what pleasant or unpleasant or curious things...I encountered in the little-known villages among the lesser-known people."

A year later, in March 1938, Thomas suggested that a group of Welsh writers should prepare a verse-report of their "own particular town, village, or district."

=== Laugharne ===
In May 1938, the Thomas family moved to Laugharne, a small town on the estuary of the river Tâf in Carmarthenshire, Wales. They lived there intermittently for just under two years until July 1941. They did not return to live there until 1949.

The author Richard Hughes, who lived in Laugharne, has recalled that Thomas spoke to him in 1939 about writing a play about Laugharne in which the townsfolk would play themselves, an idea pioneered on the radio by Cornish villagers in the 1930s. Four years later, in 1943, Thomas again met Hughes, and this time outlined a play about a Welsh village certified as 'mad' by government inspectors.

Hughes believed that when Thomas "came to write Under Milk Wood, he did not use actual Laugharne characters." Nevertheless, some elements of Laugharne are discernible in the play. A girl, age 14, named Rosie Probert ("Rosie Probert, thirty three Duck Lane. Come on up, boys, I'm dead.") was living in Horsepool Road in Laugharne at the 1921 census. Although there is no-one of that name in Laugharne in the 1939 War Register, nor anyone named Rosie, Laugharne resident, Jane Dark, has described how she told Thomas about her. Dark has also described telling Thomas about the ducks of Horsepool Road ("Duck Lane") and the drowning of the girl who went in search of them.

Both Laugharne and Llareggub have a castle, and, like Laugharne, Llareggub is on an estuary ("boat-bobbing river and sea"), with cockles, cocklers and Cockle Row. Laugharne also provides the clock tower of Myfanwy Price's dreams, as well as Salt House Farm which may have inspired the name of Llareggub's Salt Lake Farm. Llareggub's Butcher Beynon almost certainly draws on butcher and publican Carl Eynon, though he was not in Laugharne but in nearby St Clears.

=== New Quay ===
In September 1944, the Thomas family moved to a bungalow called Majoda on the cliffs outside New Quay, Cardiganshire (Ceredigion), Wales, and left in July the following year. Thomas had previously visited New Quay whilst living in nearby Talsarn in 1942–1943, and had an aunt and cousins living in New Quay. He had written a New Quay pub poem, Sooner than you can water milk, in 1943, which has several words and ideas that would later re-appear in Under Milk Wood. Thomas' bawdy letter-poem from New Quay to T. W. Earp, written just days after moving into Majoda, contains the name "No-good", anticipating Nogood Boyo of Under Milk Wood.

Thomas's wife, Caitlin, has described the year at Majoda as "one of the most important creative periods of his life...New Quay was just exactly his kind of background, with the ocean in front of him ... and a pub where he felt at home in the evenings." Thomas' biographers have taken a similar view. His time there, recalled Constantine FitzGibbon, his first biographer, was "a second flowering, a period of fertility that recalls the earliest days … [with a] great outpouring of poems", as well as a good deal of other material. Biographer Paul Ferris agreed: "On the grounds of output, the bungalow deserves a plaque of its own." Thomas' third biographer, George Tremlett, concurred, describing the time in New Quay as "one of the most creative periods of Thomas's life."

Some of those who knew him well, including FitzGibbon, have said that Thomas began writing Under Milk Wood in New Quay. The play's first producer, Douglas Cleverdon, agreed, noting that Thomas "wrote the first half within a few months; then his inspiration seemed to fail him when he left New Quay." One of Thomas' closest friends and confidantes, Ivy Williams of Brown's Hotel, Laugharne, has said "Of course, it wasn't really written in Laugharne at all. It was written in New Quay, most of it."

The writer and puppeteer, Walter Wilkinson, visited New Quay in 1947, and his essay on the town captures its character and atmosphere as Thomas would have found it two years earlier. Photos of New Quay in Thomas' day, as well as a 1959 television programme about the town, can be found here.

There were many milestones on the road to Llareggub, and these have been detailed by Professor Walford Davies in his Introduction to the definitive edition of Under Milk Wood. The most important of these was Quite Early One Morning, Thomas' description of a walk around New Quay, broadcast by the BBC in 1945, and described by Davies as a "veritable storehouse of phrases, rhythms and details later resurrected or modified for Under Milk Wood." For example, the "done-by-hand water colours" of Quite Early One Morning appear later as the "watercolours done by hand" of Under Milk Wood.

Another striking example from the 1945 broadcast is Mrs Ogmore-Pritchard who later appears as a major character in Under Milk Wood:

Open the curtains, light the fire, what are servants for?
I am Mrs. Ogmore-Pritchard and I want another snooze.
Dust the china, feed the canary, sweep the drawing-room floor;
And before you let the sun in, mind he wipes his shoes.

Mrs Ogmore Davies and Mrs Pritchard-Jones both lived on Church Street in New Quay. Mrs Pritchard-Jones was constantly cleaning, recalled one of her neighbours, "a real matron-type, very strait-laced, house-proud, ran the house like a hospital ward." In her book on New Quay, Mrs Pritchard-Jones' daughter notes that her mother had been a Queen's Nurse before her marriage and afterwards "devoted much of her time to cleaning and dusting our home ... sliding a small mat under our feet so we would not bring in any dirt from the road."

Jack Lloyd, a New Quay postman and the Town Crier, also lived on Church Street. He provided the character of Llareggub's postman Willy Nilly, whose practice of opening letters, and spreading the news, reflects Lloyd's role as Town Crier, as Thomas himself noted on a work sheet for the play: "Nobody minds him opening the letters and acting as [a] kind of town-crier. How else could they know the news?" It is this note, together with our knowledge that Thomas knew Jack Lloyd ("an old friend"), that establish the link between Willy Nilly and Lloyd.

There were also other New Quay residents in Under Milk Wood. Dai Fred Davies the donkeyman on board the fishing vessel, the Alpha, appears in the play as Tom-Fred the donkeyman. Local builder, Dan Cherry Jones, appears as Cherry Owen in the play, as Cherry Jones in Thomas' sketch of Llareggub, and as Cherry Jones in one of Thomas' work sheets for the play, where Thomas describes him as a plumber and carpenter.

The time-obsessed, "thin-vowelled laird", as Thomas described him, New Quay's reclusive English aristocrat, Alastair Hugh Graham, lover of fish, fishing and cooking, and author of Twenty Different Ways of Cooking New Quay Mackerel, is considered to be the inspiration for "Lord Cut-Glass … that lordly fish-head nibbler … in his fish-slimy kitchen ... [who] scampers from clock to clock".

Third Drowned's question at the beginning of the play, "How's the tenors in Dowlais?", reflects the special relationship that once existed between New Quay and Dowlais, an industrial town in South Wales. Its workers traditionally holidayed in New Quay and often sang on the pier on summer evenings. Such was the relationship between the two towns that when St Mair's church in Dowlais was demolished in 1963, its bell was given to New Quay's parish church.

Other names and features from New Quay in the play include Maesgwyn farm the Sailor's Home Arms, the river Dewi, the quarry, the harbour, Manchester House, the hill of windows and the Downs. The Fourth Drowned's line "Buttermilk and whippets" also comes from New Quay, as does the stopped clock in the bar of the Sailors' Arms.

Walford Davies has concluded that New Quay "was crucial in supplementing the gallery of characters Thomas had to hand for writing Under Milk Wood. FitzGibbon had come to a similar conclusion many years earlier, noting that Llareggub "resembles New Quay more closely [than Laugharne] and many of the characters derive from that seaside village in Cardiganshire..." John Ackerman has also suggested that the story of the drowned village and graveyard of Llanina, that lay in the sea below Majoda, "is the literal truth that inspired the imaginative and poetic truth" of Under Milk Wood. Another part of that literal truth were the 60 acres of cliff between New Quay and Majoda, including Maesgwyn farm, that collapsed into the sea in the early 1940s.

=== Elba, South Leigh and Prague ===
In April 1947, Thomas and family went to Italy. He intended to write a radio play there, as his letters home make clear. Several words and phrases that appear in Under Milk Wood can be found in some of Thomas' letters from the island of Elba, where he stayed for three weeks. The "fishers and miners" and "webfooted waterboys" of the letters become the "fishers" and "webfoot cocklewomen" of the first page of Under Milk Wood. The "sunblack" and "fly-black" adjectives of Elba anticipate the "crowblack" and "bible-black" descriptions of Llareggub. The play's Fourth Drowned, Alfred Pomeroy Jones, "died of blisters", and so, almost, did Thomas, as he vividly describes in a letter home. And, in time, the island's "blister-biting blimp-blue bakehouse sea" would re-appear as Llareggub's "slow, black, crowblack, fishingboat-bobbing sea."

On their return from Italy in August 1947, the Thomases moved to South Leigh, near Witney in Oxfordshire, where Thomas declared his intent to work further on the play. It was here that he knocked the play into shape, as one biographer described it. There are various accounts of his work on the play at South Leigh, where he lived until May 1949. He also worked on filmscripts here, including The Three Weird Sisters, which includes the familiar Llareggub names of Daddy Waldo and Polly Probert.

Just a month or so after moving to South Leigh, Thomas met the BBC producer, Philip Burton, in the Café Royal in London, where he outlined his ideas for "The Village of the Mad…a coastal town in south Wales which was on trial because they felt it was a disaster to have a community living in that way… For instance, the organist in the choir in the church played with only the dog to listen to him…A man and a woman were in love with each other but they never met… they wrote to each other every day…And he had the idea that the narrator should be like the listener, blind.…" Burton's friendship with Thomas, and his influence on the play, has been set within the context of the work done by Burton and T. Rowland Hughes in developing community portraiture on the radio.

Thomas went to Prague in March 1949 for a writers' conference. His guide and interpreter, Jiřina Hauková, has recalled that, at a party, Thomas "narrated the first version of his radio play Under Milk Wood". She mentions that he talked about the organist who played to goats and sheep, as well as a baker with two wives. Another at the party remembered that Thomas also talked about the two Voices.

The testimony from Prague, when taken with that of Burton about the meeting in the Café Royal in 1947, indicates that several of the characters of the play were already in place by the time Thomas had moved to the Boat House in Laugharne in May 1949: the organist, the two lovers who never met but wrote to each other, the baker with two wives, the blind narrator and the Voices.

The first known sighting of a script for the play was its first half, titled The Town that was Mad, which Thomas showed to the poet Allen Curnow in October 1949 at the Boat House.

A draft first half of the play was delivered to the BBC in late October 1950. It consisted of thirty-five handwritten pages containing most of the places, people and topography of Llareggub, and which ended with the line "Organ Morgan's at it early…" A shortened version of this first half was published in Botteghe Oscure in May 1952 with the title Llareggub. A Piece for Radio Perhaps. By the end of that year, Thomas had been in Laugharne for just over three years, but his half-play had made little progress since his South Leigh days. On 6 November 1952, he wrote to the editor of Botteghe Oscure to explain why he hadn't been able to "finish the second half of my piece for you." He had failed shamefully, he said, to add to "my lonely half of a looney maybe-play".

=== America ===
Thomas gave a reading of the unfinished play to students at Cardiff University in March 1953. He travelled to the United States in April to give the first public readings of the play, even though he had not yet written its second half. He gave a solo reading of the first half on 3 May at the Fogg Museum, Harvard, sponsored by The Poets' Theatre, where the audience responded enthusiastically.

Rehearsals for the play's official premiere on 14 May in New York City had already started but with only half the play, and with Thomas unavailable as he left to carry out a series of poetry readings and other engagements. He was up at dawn on 14 May to work on the second half, and he continued writing on the train between Boston and New York, as he travelled to the 92nd Street Y's Poetry Center for the premiere. With the performance just 90 minutes away, the "final third of the play was still unorganised and but partially written." The play's producer, Liz Reitell, locked Thomas in a room to continue work on the script, the last few lines of which were handed to the actors as they were preparing to go on stage. Thomas subsequently added some 40 new lines to the second half for the play's next reading in New York on 28 May.

The former Salad Bowl Café, Tenby

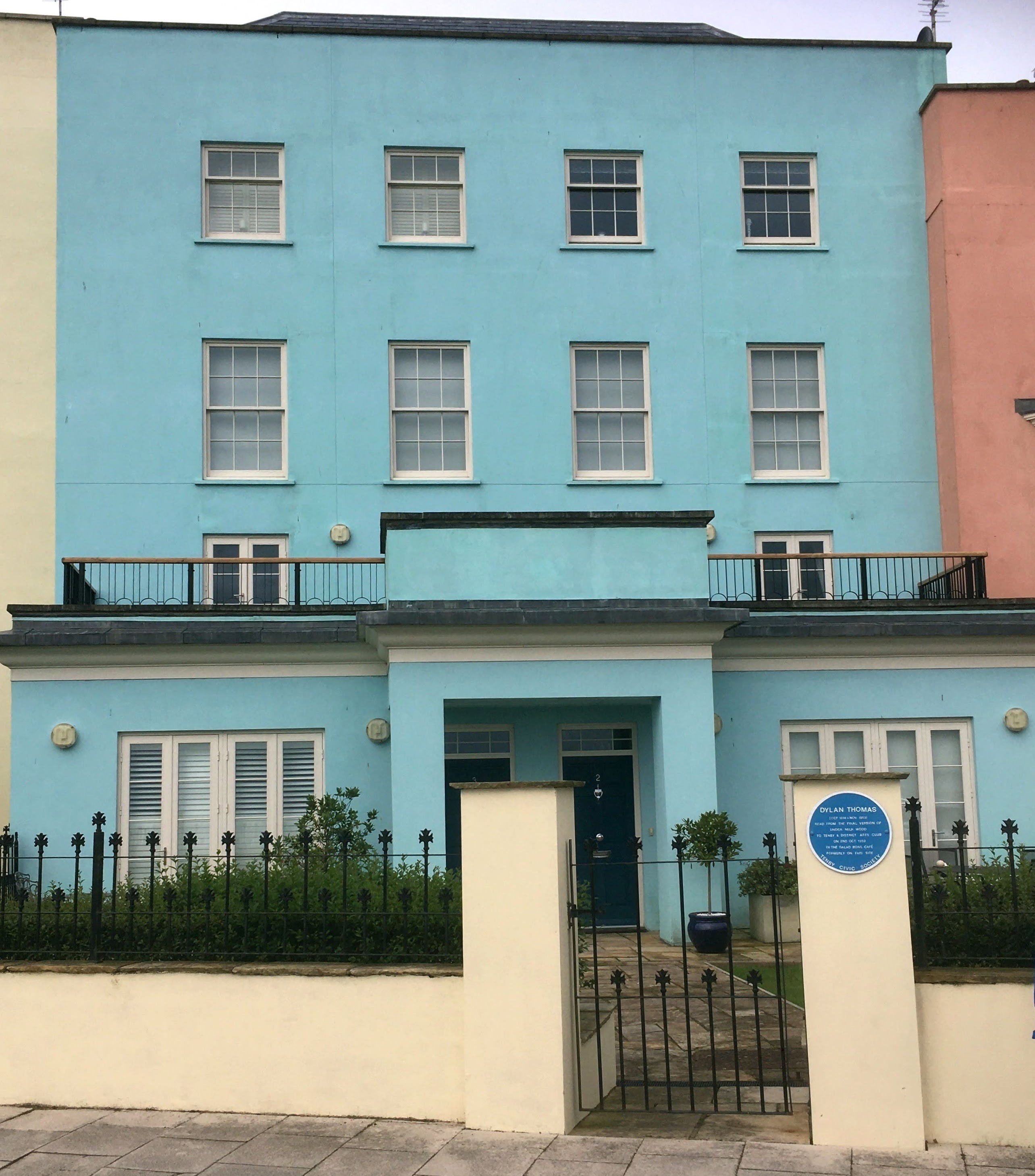
2–3 The Croft, the former Salad Bowl Café

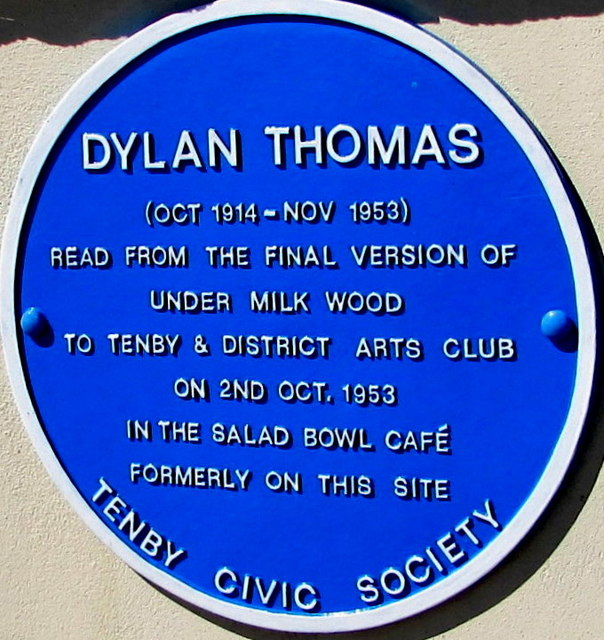
Blue plaque indicating that Thomas first read from Under Milk Wood on 2 October 1953

On his return to Laugharne, Thomas worked in a desultory fashion on Under Milk Wood throughout the summer. His daughter, Aeronwy, noticed that his health had "visibly deteriorated. ... I could hear his racking cough. Every morning he had a prolonged coughing attack. ... The coughing was nothing new but it seemed worse than before." She also noted that the blackouts that Thomas was experiencing were "a constant source of comment" amongst his Laugharne friends.

Thomas gave readings of the play in Porthcawl and Tenby, before travelling to London to catch his plane to New York for another tour, including three readings of Under Milk Wood. He stayed with the comedian Harry Locke, and worked on the play, re-writing parts of the first half, and writing Eli Jenkins' sunset poem and Waldo's chimney sweep song for the second half. Locke noticed that Thomas was very chesty, with "terrible" coughing fits that made him go purple in the face.

On 15 October 1953, Thomas delivered another draft of the play to the BBC, a draft that his producer, Douglas Cleverdon, described as being in "an extremely disordered state...it was clearly not in its final form." On his arrival in New York on 20 October 1953, Thomas added a further 38 lines to the second half, for the two performances on 24 and 25 October.

Thomas had been met at the airport by Liz Reitell, who was shocked at his appearance: "He was very ill when he got here." Thomas's agent John Brinnin, deeply in debt and desperate for money, also knew Thomas was very ill, but did not cancel or curtail his programme. He had a punishing schedule of four rehearsals and two performances of Under Milk Wood in just five days, as well as two sessions of revising the play. After the first performance on 24 October, Thomas was close to collapse, standing in his dressing room, clinging to the back of a chair. The play, he said, "has taken the life out of me for now."

At the next performance, the actors realised that Thomas was very ill and had lost his voice: "He was desperately ill … we didn't think that he would be able to do the last performance because he was so ill … Dylan literally couldn't speak he was so ill … still my greatest memory of it is that he had no voice." After a cortisone injection, he recovered sufficiently to go on stage. The play's cast noticed Thomas's worsening illness during the first three rehearsals, during one of which he collapsed. Brinnin was at the fourth and was shocked by Thomas' appearance: "I could barely stop myself from gasping aloud. His face was lime-white, his lips loose and twisted, his eyes dulled, gelid, and sunk in his head."

Through the following week, Thomas continued to work on the script for the version that was to appear in Mademoiselle, and for the performance in Chicago on 13 November. However, he collapsed in the early hours of 5 November and died in hospital on 9 November 1953.

=== Inspiration ===
The sources for the play have generated intense debate. Thomas himself declared on two occasions that his play was based on Laugharne, but this has not gone unquestioned. The towns of Llansteffan, Ferryside and particularly New Quay also have made their claims. An examination of these respective claims was published in 2004. Surprisingly little scholarship has been devoted to Thomas and Laugharne, and about the town's influence on the writing of Under Milk Wood. Thomas's four years at the Boat House were amongst his least productive, and he was away for much of the time. As his daughter, Aeronwy, has recalled, "he sought any pretext to escape."

Douglas Cleverdon has suggested that the topography of Llareggub "is based not so much on Laugharne, which lies on the mouth of an estuary, but rather on New Quay, a seaside town...with a steep street running down to the harbour." The various topographical references in the play to the 'top of the town,' and to its 'top and sea-end' are also suggestive of New Quay, as are Llareggub's terraced streets and hill of windows. The play is true to even the minor topographical details of New Quay. For example, Llareggub's lazy fishermen walk uphill from the harbour to the Sailors' Arms.

Thomas drew a sketch map of the fictional town, which is now held by the National Library of Wales and can be viewed online. The Dylan Thomas scholar, James Davies, has written that "Thomas's drawing of Llareggub is... based on New Quay" and there has been very little disagreement, if any, with this view. An examination of the sketch has revealed some interesting features: Thomas uses the name of an actual New Quay resident, Dan Cherry Jones, for one of the people living in Cockle Street. The Rev. Eli Jenkins is not in the sketch, however, and there are also three characters in the sketch who do not appear in the draft of the play given by Thomas to the BBC in October 1950.

Thomas seems to have drawn on New Quay in developing Llareggub's profile as an ocean-going, schooner and harbour town, as he once described it. Captain Cat lives in Schooner House. He and his sailors have sailed the clippered seas, as First Voice puts it. They have been to San Francisco, Nantucket and more, bringing back coconuts and parrots for their families. The Rev. Eli Jenkins' White Book of Llareggub has a chapter on shipping and another on industry, all of which reflect New Quay's history of both producing master mariners and building ocean-going ships, including schooners. In his 1947 visit to New Quay, Walter Wilkinson noted that the town "abounds" in sea captains The following year, another writer visiting New Quay noted that there were "dozens of lads who knew intimately the life and ways of all the great maritime cities of the world."

Llareggub's occupational profile as a town of seafarers, fishermen, cockle gatherers and farmers has also been examined through an analysis of the returns in the 1939 War Register for New Quay, Laugharne, Ferryside and Llansteffan. This analysis also draws upon census returns and the Welsh Merchant Mariners Index. It shows that New Quay and Ferryside provide by far the best fit with Llareggub's occupational profile.

Thomas is reported to have commented that Under Milk Wood was developed in response to the atomic bombing of Hiroshima, as a way of reasserting the evidence of beauty in the world. It is also thought that the play was a response by Thomas both to the Nazi concentration camps, and to the internment camps that had been created around Britain during World War II.

== Llareggub ==
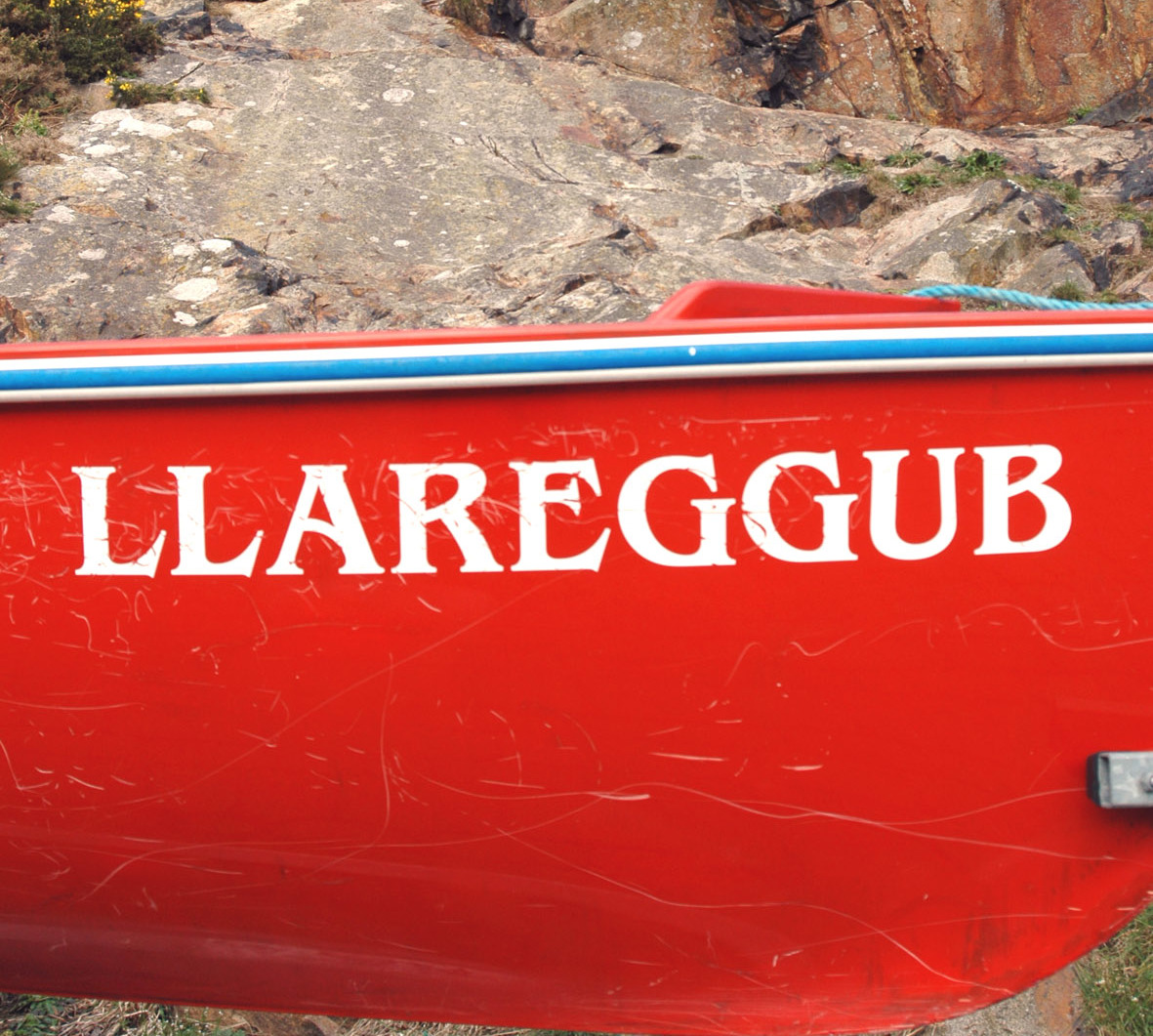
A boat bearing the name of the fictional location of Under Milk Wood

The fictional name Llareggub was derived by reversing the phrase "bugger all". In some published editions of the play, it is often rendered (contrary to Thomas's own use – see below) as Llaregyb or similar. It is pronounced [ɬaˈrɛɡɪb]. The name bears some resemblance to many actual Welsh place names, which often begin with Llan, meaning church or, more correctly, sanctified enclosure, although a double g is not used in written Welsh.

The name Llareggub was first used by Thomas in two short stories published in 1936. They were The Orchards ("This was a story more terrible than the stories of the reverend madmen in the Black Book of Llareggub.") and The Burning Baby ("Death took hold of his sister's legs as she walked through the calf-high heather up the hill... She was to him as ugly as the sowfaced woman Llareggub who had taught him the terrors of the flesh.")

Thomas' first known use of the name Llareggub in relation to Under Milk Wood was at a recitation of an early version of the play at a party in London in 1945.

Thomas had also referred to the play as The Village of the Mad or The Town that was Mad. By the summer of 1951, he was calling the play Llareggub Hill but by October 1951, when the play was sent to Botteghe Oscure, its title had become Llareggub. A Piece for Radio Perhaps. By the summer of 1952, the title was changed to Under Milk Wood because John Brinnin thought Llareggub Hill would be too thick and forbidding to attract American audiences.

In the play, the Rev Eli Jenkins writes a poem that describes Llareggub Hill and its "mystic tumulus". This was based on a lyrical description of Twmbarlwm's "mystic tumulus" in Monmouthshire that Thomas imitated from Arthur Machen's autobiography Far Off Things (1922).

The town's name is thought to be the inspiration for the country of Llamedos (sod 'em all) in Terry Pratchett's Discworld novel Soul Music. In this setting, Llamedos is a parody of Wales.

== Plot ==
The play opens at night, when the citizens of Llareggub are asleep. The narrator (First Voice/Second Voice) informs the audience that they are witnessing the townspeople's dreams.

Captain Cat, the blind sea captain, is tormented in his dreams by his drowned shipmates, who long to live again and enjoy the pleasures of the world. Mog Edwards and Myfanwy Price dream of each other; Mr. Waldo dreams of his childhood and his failed marriages; Mrs. Ogmore-Pritchard dreams of her deceased husbands. Almost all of the characters in the play are introduced as the audience witnesses a moment of their dreams.

Morning begins. The voice of a guide introduces the town, discussing the facts of Llareggub. The Reverend Eli Jenkins delivers a morning sermon on his love for the village. Lily Smalls wakes and bemoans her pitiful existence. Mr. and Mrs. Pugh observe their neighbours; the characters introduce themselves as they act in their morning. Mrs. Cherry Owen merrily rehashes her husband's drunken antics. Butcher Beynon teases his wife during breakfast. Captain Cat watches as Willy Nilly the postman goes about his morning rounds, delivering to Mrs. Ogmore-Pritchard, Mrs. Pugh, Mog Edwards and Mr. Waldo.

At Mrs. Organ-Morgan's general shop, women gossip about the townspeople. Willy Nilly and his wife steam open a love letter from Mog Edwards to Myfanwy Price; he expresses fear that he may be in the poor house if his business does not improve. Mrs. Dai Bread Two swindles Mrs. Dai Bread One with a bogus fortune in her crystal ball. Polly Garter scrubs floors and sings about her past paramours. Children play in the schoolyard; Gwennie urges the boys to "kiss her where she says or give her a penny." Gossamer Beynon and Sinbad Sailors privately desire each other.

During dinner, Mr. Pugh imagines poisoning Mrs. Pugh. Mrs. Organ-Morgan shares the day's gossip with her husband, but his only interest is the organ. The audience sees a glimpse of Lord Cut-Glass's insanity in his "kitchen full of time". Captain Cat dreams of his lost lover, Rosie Probert, but weeps as he remembers that she will not be with him again. Nogood Boyo fishes in the bay, dreaming of Mrs. Dai Bread Two and geishas.

On Llareggub Hill, Mae Rose Cottage spends a lazy afternoon wishing for love. Reverend Jenkins works on the White Book of Llareggub, which is a history of the entire town and its citizens. On the farm, Utah Watkins struggles with his cattle, aided by Bessie Bighead. As Mrs. Ogmore-Pritchard falls asleep, her husbands return to her. Mae Rose Cottage swears that she will sin until she explodes.

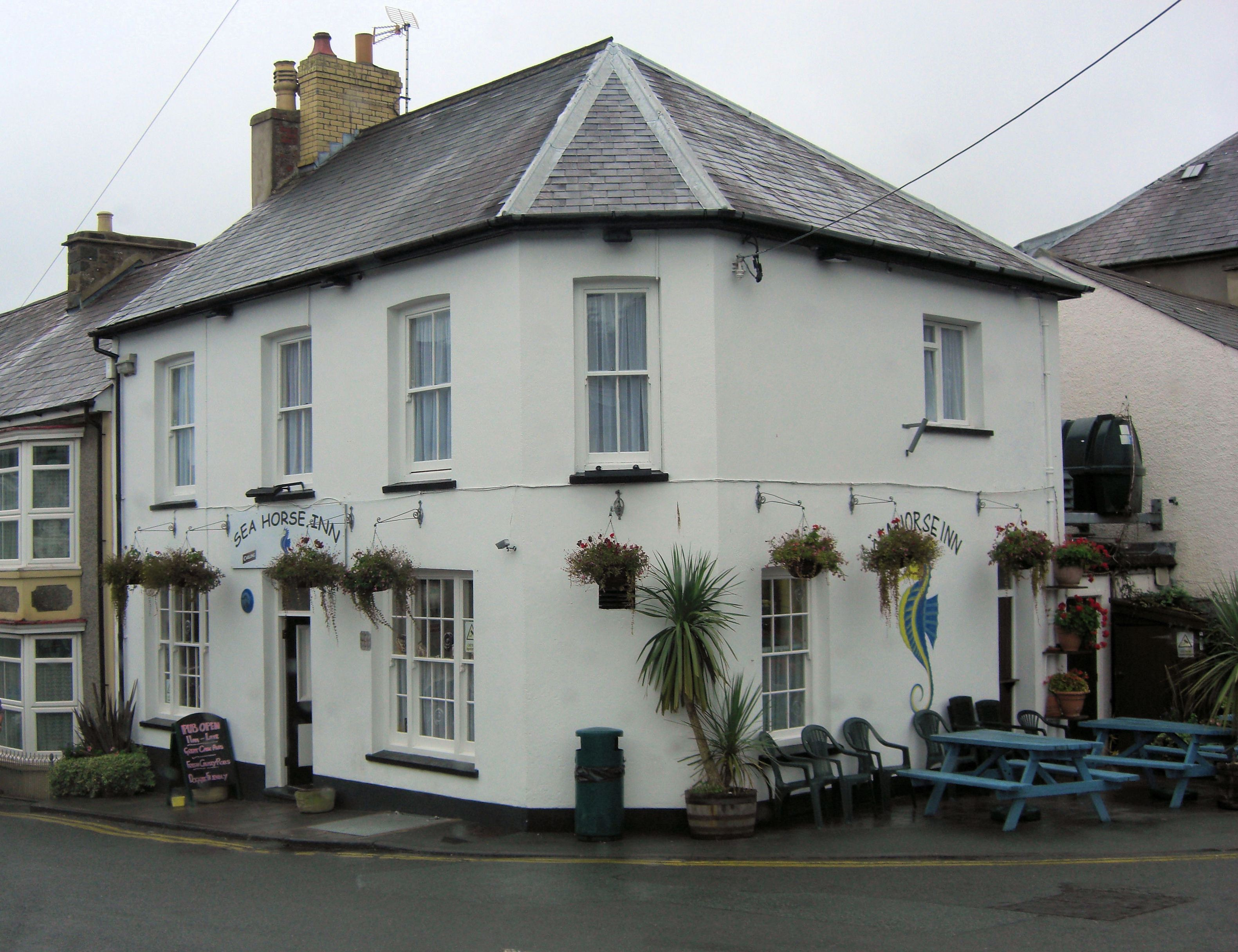
The Sailor's Home Arms, New Quay, now known as the Seahorse Inn, which provided the name for the Sailors Arms

As night begins, Reverend Jenkins recites another poem. Cherry Owen heads to the Sailor's Arms, where Sinbad still longs for Gossamer Beynon. The town prepares for the evening, to sleep or otherwise. Mr. Waldo sings drunkenly at the Sailors Arms. Captain Cat sees his drowned shipmates—and Rosie—as he begins to sleep. Organ-Morgan mistakes Cherry Owen for Johann Sebastian Bach on his way to the chapel. Mog and Myfanwy write to each other before sleeping. Mr. Waldo meets Polly Garter in a forest. Night begins and the citizens of Llareggub return to their dreams again.

== Characters ==
- Captain Cat – The old blind sea captain who dreams of his deceased shipmates and lost lover Rosie Probert. He is one of the play's most important characters as he often acts as a narrator. He comments on the goings-on in the village from his window.
- Rosie Probert – Captain Cat's deceased lover, who appears in his dreams.
- Myfanwy Price – The sweetshop-keeper who dreams of marrying Mog Edwards.
- Mr. Mog Edwards – The draper, enamoured of Myfanwy Price. Their romance, however, is restricted strictly to the letters they write one another and their interactions in their dreams.
- Jack Black – The cobbler, who dreams of scaring away young couples.
- Evans the Death – The undertaker, who dreams of his childhood.
- Mr. Waldo – Rabbit catcher, barber, herbalist, cat doctor, quack, dreams of his mother and his many unhappy, failed marriages. He is a notorious alcoholic and general troublemaker and is involved in an affair with Polly Garter.
- Mrs. Ogmore-Pritchard – The owner of a guesthouse, who dreams of nagging her two late husbands. She refuses to let anyone stay at the guesthouse because of her extreme penchant for neatness.
- Mr. Ogmore – Deceased, Linoleum salesman, late of Mrs. Ogmore-Pritchard.
- Mr. Pritchard – Deceased, failed bookmaker, late of Mrs. Ogmore-Pritchard. He committed suicide "ironically" by ingesting disinfectant.
- Gossamer Beynon – The schoolteacher (daughter of Butcher Beynon), dreams of a fox-like illicit love. During the day, she longs to be with Sinbad Sailors, but the two never interact.
- Organ Morgan – The church organ player has perturbed dreams of music and orchestras within the village. His obsession with music bothers his wife intensely.
- Mrs. Organ Morgan – A shop owner who dreams of "silence," as she is disturbed during the day by Organ Morgan's constant organ-playing.
- Mr. & Mrs. Floyd – The cocklers, an elderly couple, seemingly the only couple to sleep peacefully in the village. They are mentioned only during the dream sequence and when Mrs Floyd is "talking flatfish" with Nogood Boyo.
- Utah Watkins – The farmer, dreams of counting sheep that resemble his wife.
- Ocky Milkman – The milkman, dreams of pouring his milk into a river, 'regardless of expense'.
- Mr. Cherry Owen – Dreams of drinking and yet is unable to, as the tankard turns into a fish, which he drinks.
- Mrs. Cherry Owen – Cherry Owen's devoted wife, who cares for him and delights in rehashing his drunken antics.
- Police Constable Attila Rees – The policeman, relieves himself into his helmet at night, knowing somehow he will regret this in the morning.
- Mr. Willy Nilly – The postman, dreams of delivering the post in his sleep, and physically knocks upon his wife as if knocking upon a door. In the morning they open the post together and read the town's news so that he can relay it around the village.
- Mrs. Willy Nilly – who, because of her husband's knocking upon her, dreams of being spanked by her teacher for being late for school. She assists Willy Nilly in steaming open the mail.
- Mary Ann Sailors – 85 years old, dreams of the Garden of Eden. During the day she announces her age ("I'm 85 years, 3 months and a day!") to the town.
- Sinbad Sailors – The barman, dreams of Gossamer Beynon, whom he cannot marry because of his grandmother's disapproval.
- Mae Rose Cottage – Seventeen and never been kissed, she dreams of meeting her "Mr. Right". She spends the day in the fields daydreaming and unseen, draws lipstick circles around her nipples.
- Bessie Bighead – Hired help, dreams of the one man that kissed her "because he was dared".
- Butcher Beynon – The butcher, dreams of riding pigs and shooting wild giblets. During the day he enjoys teasing his wife about the questionable meat that he sells.
- Mrs. Butcher Beynon – Butcher Beynon's wife, dreams of her husband being 'persecuted' for selling "owl's meat, dogs' eyes, manchop."
- Rev. Eli Jenkins – The reverend, poet and preacher, dreams of Eisteddfodau. Author of the White Book of Llareggub.
- Mr. Pugh – Schoolmaster, dreams of poisoning his domineering wife. He purchases a book named "Lives of the Great Poisoners" for ideas on how to kill Mrs. Pugh; however, he does not do it.
- Mrs. Pugh – The nasty and undesirable wife of Mr. Pugh.
- Dai Bread – The bigamist baker who dreams of harems.
- Mrs. Dai Bread One – Dai Bread's first wife, traditional and plain.
- Mrs. Dai Bread Two – Dai Bread's second wife, a mysterious and sultry gypsy.
- Polly Garter – has affairs with married men of the village, and a young mother, who dreams of her many babies. During the day, she scrubs floors and sings of her lost love.
- Nogood Boyo – A lazy young fisherman who dreams peevishly of "nothing", though he later fantasises about Mrs. Dai Bread Two in a wet corset. He is known for causing shenanigans in the wash house.
- Lord Cut-Glass – A man of questionable sanity, who dreams of the 66 clocks that he keeps in his house, all telling different times.
- Lily Smalls – Dreams of love and a fantasy life. She is the Beynons' maid, but longs for a more exciting life.
- Gwennie – A child in Llareggub, who insists that her male schoolmates "kiss her where she says or give her a penny".

== Publication and translation ==
The first publication of Under Milk Wood, a shortened version of the first half of the play, appeared in Botteghe Oscure in April 1952. Two years later, in February 1954, both The Observer newspaper and Mademoiselle magazine published abridged versions. The first publications of the complete play were also in 1954: J. M. Dent in London in February and New Directions in America in April.

An Acting Edition of the play was published by Dent in 1958. The Definitive Edition, with one Voice, came out in 1995, edited by Walford Davies and Ralph Maud and published by Dent. A Project Gutenberg of Australia eBook for free use went online in November 2006, produced by Colin Choat.

The first translation was published in November 1954 by Drei Brücken Verlag in Germany, as Unter dem Milchwald, translated by Erich Fried. A few months later, in January 1955, the play appeared in the French journal Les Lettres Nouvelles as Le Bois de Lait, translated by Roger Giroux, with two further instalments in February and March.

Over the next three years, Under Milk Wood was published in Dutch, Polish, Danish, Estonian, Norwegian, Finnish, Swedish, Japanese and Italian. It's estimated that it has now been translated into over thirty languages, including Welsh with a translation by T. James Jones, (Jim Parc Nest), published in 1968 as Dan Y Wenallt.

Under Milk Wood, along with all other published works by Thomas, entered the public domain in the United Kingdom on 1 January 2024.

== Casts of principal productions ==
Character	1953 New York	1954 BBC Radio	1956 New Theatre	1957 BBC TV	1963 BBC Radio	1964 BBC TV	1971 Film	1988 EMI Recording	2003 BBC Radio	2014 BBC TV
First Voice	Dylan Thomas	Richard Burton	Donald Houston	Donald Houston	Richard Burton	Donald Houston	Richard Burton	Anthony Hopkins	Richard Burton	Michael Sheen
Second Voice	Dion Allen	Richard Bebb					Ryan Davies	Jonathan Pryce	Siân Phillips	
Captain Cat	Roy Poole	Hugh Griffith	William Squire	William Squire	Hugh Griffith	Aubrey Richards	Peter O'Toole	Freddie Jones	Glyn Houston	Tom Jones
Rosie Probert	Nancy Wickwire	Rachel Thomas	Catherine Dolan	Catherine Dolan	Gwyneth Petty	Gwyneth Petty	Elizabeth Taylor	Mary Hopkin	Mali Harries	Nia Roberts
Polly Garter	Nancy Wickwire	Diana Maddox	Diana Maddox	Marion Grimaldi	Margo Jenkins	Marion Grimaldi	Ann Beach	Bonnie Tyler	Eiry Thomas	Katherine Jenkins
Mr Mog Edwards	Allen F. Collins	Dafydd Harvard	Aubrey Richards	Aubrey Richards	Aubrey Richards	Richard Davies	Victor Spinetti	Gareth Thomas	Matthew Rhys	Ioan Gruffudd
Myfanwy Price	Sada Thompson	Sybil Williams	Gwyneth Owen	Gwyneth Owen	Margo Jenkins	Gwyneth Owen	Glynis Johns	Angharad Rees	Lisa Palfrey	Kimberley Nixon
Mrs Ogmore-Pritchard	Sada Thompson	Dylis Davies	Dorothea Phillips	Dorothea Phillips	Dorothea Phillips	Dorothea Prichard	Siân Phillips	Nerys Hughes	Christine Pritchard	Charlotte Church
Mr Ogmore	Allen F. Collins	David Close-Thomas	Denys Graham		David Garfield	Jack Walters	Dillwyn Owen	Emrys James	Sion Probert	Tom Ellis
Mr Pritchard	Dion Allen	Ben Williams	John Gill		John Gill	Emrys Leyshon	Richard Davies	Glyn Houston	Islwyn Morris	Aneirin Hughes
Butcher Beynon	Allen F. Collins	Meredith Edwards	Gareth Jones	Gareth Jones	Richard Curnock	Ieuan Rhys Williams	Hubert Rees	Harry Secombe	Sion Probert	Robert Pugh
Gossamer Beynon	Nancy Wickwire	Gwenllian Owen	Patricia Mort	Margo Jenkins	Margo Jenkins	Margaret John	Angharad Rees	Carole Morgan-Hopkin	Alexandra Millar	
The Rev Eli Jenkins	Dylan Thomas	Philip Burton	T. H. Evans	T. H. Evans		T. H. Evans	Aubrey Richards	Geraint Evans	Wayne Forester	Bryn Terfel
Lily Smalls	Sada Thompson	Gwyneth Petty	Angela Crow	Angela Crow		Maralynn Burt	Meg Wyn Owen	Ruth Madoc	Catrin Rhys	Eve Myles
Mr Pugh	Roy Poole	John Huw Jones	Raymond Llewellyn	Raymond Llewellyn	Raymond Llewellyn	Talfryn Thomas	Talfryn Thomas	Bernard Lloyd	Steffan Rhodri	Jonathan Pryce
Mrs Pugh	Nancy Wickwire	Mary Jones	Claudine Morgan	Claudine Morgan	Rachel Thomas	Mary Jones	Vivien Merchant	Siân Phillips	Sara McGaughey	Siân Phillips
Mary Ann Sailors	Sada Thompson	Rachel Thomas	Betty Lloyd-Davies		Betty Lloyd-Davies		Rachel Thomas	Rachel Thomas	Christine Pritchard	Sharon Morgan
Sinbad Sailors	Allen F. Collins	Aubrey Richards	Peter Halliday		Talfryn Thomas	Hubert Rees	Michael Forrest	Robin Davies	Steven Meo	Jon Tregenna
Dai Bread	Allen F. Collins	David Close-Thomas	John Gill		John Gill		Dudley Jones	David Lloyd Meredith		Owen Teale
Mrs Dai Bread One	Sada Thompson	Gwyneth Petty	Barbara Alleyn		Guinevere Roberts	Dorothea Phillips	Dorothea Phillips	Elin Jenkins	Mali Harries	Di Botcher
Mrs Dai Bread Two	Nancy Wickwire	Rachel Roberts	Catherine Dolan		Patricia Mort	Pamela Conway	Ruth Madoc	Molly Parkin	Sara McGaughey	Sian Thomas
Willy Nilly Postman	Dion Allen	Ben Williams	Cliff Gordon	Emrys Leyshon	Mervyn Johns	Denys Graham	Tim Wylton	Ray Smith	Iestyn Jones	Tom Rhys Harries
Mrs Willy Nilly	Nancy Wickwire	Rachel Thomas	Joan Newell	Joan Newell	Rachel Thomas	Yvette Rees	Bronwen Williams	Welsh: Rhoda Lewis	Eiry Thomas	
Cherry Owen	Dion Allen	John Ormond Thomas	John Gill		John Gill	John Gill	Glynn Edwards	Philip Madoc	Andy Hockley	
Mrs Cherry Owen	Nancy Wickwire	Lorna Davies	Buddug-Mair Powell		Buddug-Mair Powell	Buddug-Mair Powell	Bridget Turner	Liz Morgan	Ruth Jones	
Nogood Boyo	Allen F. Collins	Dillwyn Owen	Denys Graham	Denys Graham		Howell Evans	David Jason	Simon Bowman		Craig Roberts
Organ Morgan	Roy Poole	John Glyn-Jones	Richard Curnock	Richard Curnock		David Garfield	Richard Parry	Victor Spinetti		
Mrs Organ Morgan	Sada Thompson	Olwen Brookes	Barbara Alleyn			Patricia Mort	Dilys Price	Gemma Jones	Ruth Jones	
Mae Rose Cottage	Sada Thompson	Rachel Roberts	Margo Jenkins			Nerys Hughes	Susan Penhaligon	Myfanwy Talog	Catrin Rhys	Alexandra Roach
Gwennie	Sada Thompson	Norma Jones	Virginia Graham				Olwen Rees	Rhian Kirby		
Jack Black	Roy Poole	John Glyn Jones	David Rees				John Rees	Jack Walters	Steffan Rhodri	
Evans the Death	Allen F. Collins	Meredith Edwards	Richard Curnock				Mark Jones	Raymond Bowers		Iwan Rheon
Mr Waldo	Roy Poole	Meredith Edwards	Gareth Jones	Gareth Jones		Roderick Jones	Ray Smith	Tom Jones	Steffan Rhodri	
Waldo's Mother		Olwen Brookes	Betty Lloyd-Davies					Meg Wynn Owen		
Waldo's Wife		Mary Jones	Diana Maddox					Elin Jenkins		
Utah Watkins	Allen F. Collins	Meredith Edwards	Aubrey Richards				David Davies	Hubert Rees		
Mrs Utah Watkins	Nancy Wickwire	Rachel Thomas					Maudie Edwards	Shirley King		
Ocky Milkman	Roy Poole	Dillwyn Owen	Raymond Llewellyn				Griffith Davies	Ifan Gruffydd		
PC Attila Rees	Allen F. Collins					Brinley Jenkins	Davyd Harries	Windsor Davies		
Bessie Bighead	Nancy Wickwire	Gwyneth Petty	Buddug-Mair Powell				Peggy Ann Clifford	Shirley King		
Mrs Butcher Beynon	Nancy Wickwire	Olwen Brookes	Joan Newell			Branwen Iorwerth	Mary Jones	Welsh: Harriet Lewis	Sharon Morgan	Suzanne Packer
Lord Cut-Glass	Dion Allen	John Glyn Jones	Aubrey Richards			Richard Davies	Dafydd Havard	Clyde Pollitt		
Gomer Owen							Ieuan Rhys Williams			
First Neighbour	Nancy Wickwire	Gwyneth Petty	Joan Newell					Welsh: Gwenyth Petty		Sophie Evans
Second Neighbour	Sada Thompson	Sybil Williams	Buddug-Mair Powell					Victoria Plucknett		Melanie Walters
Third Neighbour		Lorna Davies	Claudine Morgan					Lynette Davies		
Fourth Neighbour		May Jones	Catherine Dolan					Welsh: Harriet Lewis		
First Woman	Sada Thompson	Gwenllian Owen	Angela Crow					Welsh: Gwenyth Petty		
Second Woman (song)								Shirley King		
Second Woman	Nancy Wickwire	Rachel Roberts	Gwyneth Owen					Victoria Plucknett		
Third Woman								Shirley King		
Fourth Woman								Mary Hopkin		
Child's Voice	Sada Thompson							Elin Wyn Davies		
First Drowned	Allen F. Collins	Dillwyn Owen	Peter Halliday					Windsor Davies		Tom Rhys Harries
Second Drowned	Dylan Thomas	Meredith Edwards	Raymond Llewellyn					Ifan Gruffydd		Karl Johnson
Third Drowned	Allen F. Collins	John Huw Jones	Richard Curnock					Raymond Bowers		Iwan Rheon
Fourth Drowned	Dion Allen	Philip Burton	Cliff Gordon					Sion Probert		Aneurin Barnard
Fifth Drowned	Dylan Thomas	John Ormond Thomas	David Rees					Bob Kingdom		
Voice of a Guide Book	Roy Poole	John Huw Jones						Alan Bennett	John Humphrys	Griff Rhys Jones
Billy	Roy Poole							Carwyn Davies		
Johnny Cristo	Dion Allen							Rhys Thomas		
Dicky	Allen F. Collins							Richard Fowler		
One of Mr Waldo's/Little Boy Waldo			Daphne Shaven					Aled Jones		
Matti Richards				Daphne Shaven				Mary Hopkin		
Matti's Mother		Rachel Thomas	Gwyneth Owen					Shirley King		
Fisherman			David Rees					Windsor Davies		
Fisherman			John Gill					Ifan Gruffydd		
Mother								Lynette Davies		
Preacher/Big Ben/Old Man/Drinker								Raymond Bowers		
Voice										Matthew Rhys
Voice										Aimee-Ffion Edwards
Voice										Griff Rhys Jones
Voice										John Rhys-Davies
Voice										Andrew Howard
Voice										Rakie Ayola

== Production history ==
=== Audio ===
The play was first heard in public on 14 May 1953, at The Poetry Center at the 92nd Street Y, New York. It was one of three public readings of the play Thomas gave there; he read the parts of the First Voice and the Reverend Eli Jenkins. The performance was recorded on a single-microphone tape recording (the microphone was laid at front centre on the stage floor) and later issued by Caedmon Records. It is the only recorded performance of Under Milk Wood with Thomas in the cast. A studio recording, planned for 1954, was precluded by Thomas's death in November 1953.

The BBC first broadcast Under Milk Wood, described as "a new Play for Voices", on the Third Programme on 25 January 1954, two months after Thomas's death; several sections were omitted. The play, produced by Douglas Cleverdon, was recorded with an all-Welsh cast including Richard Burton as First Voice. A repeat was broadcast two days later. Daniel Jones, the Welsh composer who was a lifelong friend of Thomas's (and his literary trustee), wrote the music; this was recorded separately, on 15 and 16 January, at Laugharne School. The play won the Prix Italia award for radio drama that year.

On 10 March 1954 the BBC German Service, broadcast a translation by Erich Fried as Unter dem Milchwald; this was followed on 20 September by the first broadcast on German radio itself.

In 1963 Cleverdon, the original radio producer, revisited the play and recorded the complete text, which was broadcast on the Third Programme on 11 October 1963.

In 1988 George Martin produced an album version, featuring more of the dialogue sung, with music by Martin and Elton John, among others; Antony Hopkins played the part of "First Voice".

In November 2003, as part of their commemoration of the fiftieth anniversary of Thomas's death, BBC radio broadcast a new production of the play, combining new actors with the original 1954 recording of Burton playing "First Voice". (Broadcast 15 November 2003, BBC Radio 4; repeated 24 December 2004.) Digital noise reduction technology allowed Burton's part to be incorporated unobtrusively into the new recording, which was intended to represent Welsh voices more realistically than the original.

=== Stage ===
Theatre readings of the play in February 1954 included extracts read at the Dylan Thomas Memorial Recital at the Royal Festival Hall, London. and a complete reading at the Old Vic with Burton, Meredith Edwards, Jessie Evans, Clifford Evans, Rachel Roberts, Sybil Thorndike and Emlyn Williams; it was adapted and presented by Philip Burton.

Reviewing the BBC broadcast, The Stage commented, "Every moment belongs to the medium of radio … There is definitely no need here for scenery and props" Nonetheless, the play has subsequently been staged in many theatres, beginning in November 1954 at the Théâtre de la Cour Saint-Pierre, Geneva, by Phoenix Productions, with sound effects lent by the BBC. The impresario Henry Sherek obtained the theatrical rights and his production, directed by Cleverdon and Edward Burnham, was seen at the Edinburgh Festival in August 1956 before transferring the following month to the West End, where it ran at the New Theatre for 250 performances.

In 1968 the Royal Shakespeare Company presented a production of the play as part of its "Theatregoround" programme in which small casts played to audiences in parts of the UK in which theatre was rarely or never seen. Terry Hands directed and the seven-strong cast included Emrys James, Bruce Myers and Susan Fleetwood. This was Hands's second production of the play: at the Everyman Theatre, Liverpool in 1965 he had directed a similarly small-cast production, in which both Myers and Fleetwood appeared. He directed a third small-scale production in 1999 for the Theatr Clwyd. In April 1970 a new company, Topaz Productions, staged the play at the May Fair Theatre, London. The cast included Windsor Davies, Philip Madoc, David Jason, Ruth Madoc and Clive Merrison.

In 1983 there was a one night staging of the play at the Duke of Yorks theatre , st martins lane , London. Produced by Douglas Cleverdon. Starring Richard Burton as first voice.

Guy Masterson of Theatre Tours International produced and performed a solo version of the play, given more than 2000 times since its world premiere in 1994. It has been performed at the Edinburgh Festival in 1994, 1996, 2000, 2003, 2007 and 2010; in Adelaide, Australia, in 2006, 2007, 2008, 2009 and 2012; and in the West End of London at the Arts Theatre. Martin's 1988 audio adaptation was subsequently produced as a one-off stage performance (as An Evening with Dylan Thomas) for The Prince's Trust, to commemorate the opening in December 1992 of the new AIR Studios at Lyndhurst Hall. It was produced by Martin and directed by Hopkins, who once again played the First Voice. Other roles were played by Harry Secombe, Freddie Jones, Catherine Zeta-Jones, Siân Phillips, Jonathan Pryce, Alan Bennett, and Tom Jones.

In 2009 and 2010 a Dutch translation by Hugo Claus was performed on stage by Jan Decleir and Koen De Sutter on a theatre tour in Belgium and the Netherlands (e.g. the Zeeland Late-Summer Festival, the Vooruit in Ghent, etc.). In 2010 a one-woman production of the text was performed at the Sidetrack Theatre in Sydney, presented by Bambina Borracha Productions and directed by Vanessa Hughes. Zoe Norton Lodge performed all 64 characters in the play. In July 2011 Progress Youth Theatre (Reading, Berkshire, UK) performed a stage adaptation of the radio script. All visual aspects, such as stage directions, costume, set and lighting design were therefore devised entirely by the youth theatre. The voice parts were shared equally among seven actors, with other actors playing multiple "named" parts (with the exception of Captain Cat, who remained on stage throughout the production).

In 2012 the Sydney Theatre Company staged a production starring Jack Thompson as First Voice and Sandy Gore as Second Voice, with a cast including Bruce Spence, Paula Arundell, Drew Forsythe, Alan John, Drew Livingston and Helen Thomson. The production was staged in the Drama Theatre of the Sydney Opera House.

In 2021, as part of its post-COVID-19 programme, the National Theatre presented an adaptation of Under Milk Wood with Michael Sheen reprising his role as First Voice. This new adaptation included additional material from Siân Owen extending Thomas's original script with framing scenes set in a care home. The adaptation tells the story of First Voice trying to connect with his father, played by Karl Johnson, who has dementia, by inventing stories of characters from the village his father lived in as a boy. In 2026 Kate Wasserberg directed a new production for Theatr Clwyd.

=== Screen ===
The first attempt to bring the play to the screen was in May 1957 when the BBC broadcast a televised version narrated by Donald Houston.

A 1971 film adaptation, with Burton reprising his role, also featured Elizabeth Taylor, Peter O'Toole, Glynis Johns, Vivien Merchant and other well-known actors, including Ryan Davies as the "Second Voice". It was filmed on location in Fishguard, Pembrokeshire, and at Lee International Film Studios in London.

In 1992 Brightspark Productions released a 50-minute animation version, using an existing BBC recording with Burton as narrator. This was commissioned by S4C (a Welsh-language public service broadcaster). Music was composed specially by Trevor Herbert and performed by the Treorchy Male Voice Choir and the Welsh Brass Consort.

In 2014 Pip Broughton directed an adaptation of the play for the BBC, starring Michael Sheen, Tom Jones, and Jonathan Pryce.

=== Musical adaptations ===
Stan Tracey composed an Under Milk Wood Jazz Suite released on record in 1965. and subsequently presented in public with Tracey's quartet and a narrator.

In 1997 the pianist and composer Tony Gould's adaptation of Under Milk Wood for narrator and chamber orchestra was first performed by the actor John Stanton and the Queensland Philharmonic Orchestra.

In 2006 Akos Banlaky composed an opera with the libretto based on the German translation by Fried, performed at Tiroler Landestheater in Innsbruck, Austria).

In 2008 François Narboni composed an opera, Au Bois lacté, based on his own translation and adaptation of Under Milk Wood. It was created at the Opéra-Théâtre in Metz, France, with staging by Antoine Juliens. The work is for 12 singers, large mixed choir, children choir, accordion, dancer and electronics sounds.

In 2008 a ballet version of Under Milk Wood by Independent Ballet Wales toured the UK. It was choreographed by Darius James with music by Thomas Hewitt Jones. A suite including music from the ballet was recorded by Court Lane Music in 2009.

In 2012 Gould's 1997 adaptation for narrator and chamber orchestra was again performed by Stanton as part of the Victorian College of the Arts Secondary School's inaugural performance at the Melbourne Recital Centre. Gould played piano and worked with the students as a musical mentor. In 2014 the Welsh-born composer John Metcalf wrote the music for Under Milk Wood: An Opera, a one-act chamber piece using Thomas's text as its libretto. The work was recorded and released on the Ty Cerdd label as a double CD set in 2016. A DVD made by the original cast days before the premiere was released in 2014.

=== Other ===
In October 2014 the BBC launched an interactive ebook entitled Dylan Thomas: The Road To Milk Wood, written by Jon Tregenna and Robin Moore. It deals with Thomas's journey from Swansea via the BBC to New York and beyond.

In 2020 a production starred Kenneth Welsh and featured a deaf sign language performer, Missy Keast.

== Quotations ==
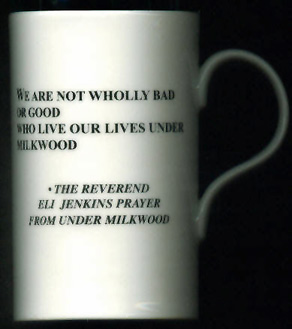
One of many articles celebrating the work of Dylan Thomas. This mug bears a quotation from the prayer of the Rev Eli Jenkins in 'Under Milk Wood'.

- To begin at the beginning: It is spring, moonless night in the small town, starless and bible-black, the cobblestreets silent and the hunched, courters'-and-rabbits' wood limping invisible down to the sloeblack, slow, black, crowblack, fishingboatbobbing sea. – opening lines, spoken by First Voice
- We are not wholly bad or good, who live our lives under Milk Wood – prayer of the Reverend Eli Jenkins
- Black as a chimbley! – Third neighbour
- Me, No-Good Boyo is up to no good... in the wash house. – Nogood Boyo
- I am going into the darkness of the darkness forever. I have forgotten that I was ever born. – Rosie Probert

== References in other media ==
- Paula Rego won the Slade Summer Composition Competition in 1954 with her oil on canvas, Under Milk Wood.
- James Salter was inspired by the play to become a writer.
- The album The Kinks Are the Village Green Preservation Society (1968) by The Kinks was inspired partly by Under Milk Wood, according to its creator, songwriter Ray Davies. Also, the Kinks song "Polly" contains the line "pretty Polly Garter".
- The album Starless and Bible Black (1974) by King Crimson, as well as the instrumental title track, is named after a phrase used in the opening of the play (noted in the Quotations section above). The phrase "Starless and Bible Black" is also referenced in the song "Starless" on the follow-up album Red (1974).
- The Deutsche Grammophon album We'll Keep a Welcome (2000) by Bryn Terfel includes a setting of Eli Jenkins's Sunset Poem set to music by A. H. D. Troyte, arranged by Chris Hazell.
- Hedwig Gorski's 2015 radio drama 13 Donuts was inspired by Under Milk Wood and the poet claims Thomas as her major inspiration and influence.
- Frank Zappa quotes, though not precisely, the passage about Mr. Pugh's plans to poison his wife during a 1979 London performance of "Nanook Rubs It," which appears as part of a "Don't Eat the Yellow Snow" medley on the live album You Can't Do That on Stage Anymore, Vol. 1 (1988).
- The Decemberists' song "Billy Liar" (2004) includes references to the character of Nogood Boyo and his fantasy of Mrs. Dai Bread Two and the corset.
- Terry Pratchett's Discworld country of Llamedos is a reference to Llareggub.
- The Japanese rock group LSD March released an album titled Under Milk Wood (2009).
- The indie-rock band Evans The Death, formed in London in 2011, take their name from the undertaker.
- Paul McCartney has described how Under Milk Wood was one of the inspirations for the lyrics in the Beatles classic song, “Penny Lane.”
- The prayer recited by Reverend Eli Jenkins in the play, known as the "Sunset Poem", is referenced in two episodes of the BBC One television series Our Girl. The poem is referenced by the character Dylan "Smurf" Smith in the episode "Changes" (Season One, Episode Three, 5 October 2014). It is then recited by the character Captain Charles James at a funeral in the episode "Heroes" (Season One, Episode Five, 19 October 2014).

== Sources ==
- Herbert, Ian, ed. (1977). Who's Who in the Theatre (sixteenth ed.). London and Detroit: Pitman Publishing and Gale Research. ISBN 978-0-273-00163-8.

== Readings ==
- Dylan Thomas (1953) 3 parts
- Richard Burton (1954) part 1
- Extract by Guy Masterson from Lakeside Arts
