= Lorraine Barrett =

Welsh politician (born 1950)

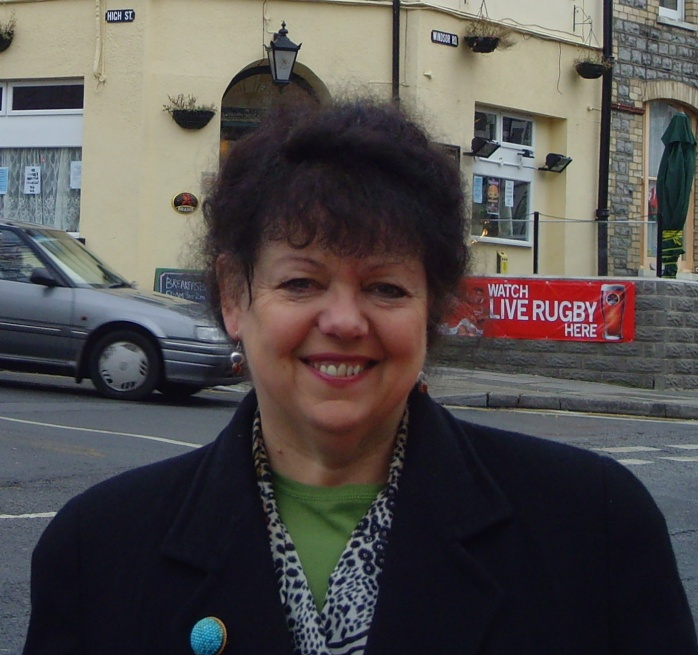

Assembly Commissioner
- In office 9 June 2007 – 25 May 2011
- Preceded by: New post
- Succeeded by: Sandy Mewies

Member of the Welsh Assembly for Cardiff South and Penarth
- In office 6 May 1999 – 5 May 2011
- Preceded by: New Assembly
- Succeeded by: Vaughan Gething
- Majority: 2,754 (10.3%)

Personal details
- Born: 18 March 1950 (age 76) Ynyshir, Rhondda, Wales
- Party: Labour and Co-operative Party
- Spouse: Paul Barrett
- Children: 2

Lorraine Jayne Barrett (born 18 March 1950) is a former Welsh Labour & Co-operative Member of the National Assembly for Wales for Cardiff South and Penarth and an Assembly Commissioner from 2007 until 2011.

Barrett publicly announced in February 2009 that she would not be seeking re-election to the Assembly in 2011 and would instead pursue her new vocation as a Humanists UK-accredited humanist Celebrant. She now conducts humanist or non-religious funeral ceremonies for local residents.

== Personal background ==
Barrett was born in Ynyshir, Rhondda, to Rosina and Donald Booth, a retired coalminer, and went to Porth County School for Girls. She married Paul "Legs" Barrett, the manager/agent of rock and roll acts such as Shakin' Stevens and the Sunsets. They have a son, Lincoln Barrett (also known as drum and bass DJ High Contrast) and a daughter, Satellite City actor Shelley Miranda Barrett.

Barrett is a humanist and patron of Humanists UK and retired from constituency politics in 2011 to concentrate on her humanist celebrant duties.

== Professional career ==
She was a nurse and a councillor in the Vale of Glamorgan (Alexandra ward) and Penarth Town Council and worked as an assistant to the then Cardiff South and Penarth Member of Parliament, Alun Michael for 12 years from 1987 to 1999. She was a member of the Welsh Labour executive and the National Policy Forum.

Barrett was elected to the Welsh National Assembly as the member for Cardiff South and Penarth in May 1999 and was subsequently re-elected twice. Her period as an Assembly member ended in 2011.

Barrett is a member of the Unite the Union and chaired the Co-operative Party Group and the All-Party Parliamentary Group on Animal Welfare within the Assembly. She is an Honorary Associate of the National Secular Society. She is also a member of Humanists UK (formerly the British Humanist Association) and is a trained Celebrant, conducting Humanist or non-religious funeral ceremonies. In May 2017, she led the funeral ceremony for former First Minister of Wales, Rhodri Morgan.

== Welsh Assembly Commissioner ==
In her capacity as Assembly Commissioner for a Sustainable Environment, she was involved in a 2007 row over genetically modified foods in the Welsh Assembly Canteen. The Assembly had earlier signed a document committing to "maximum restrictions on GM crops" when it later became apparent that the Assembly canteen was serving items containing GM ingredients. Barrett explained the situation saying "We have discussed this with our in-house caterers, Charlton House. They do not deliberately source GM foods and in fact make every effort to avoid using GM products."

Barrett was critical of the planned Cardiff Bay expansion of "something like 1,250 apartments a year". Barrett suggested this might cause future problems with community cohesion and lack of affordable housing.

Barrett pressed for the Cardiff Bay Barrage to be opened up for pedestrian and cycle traffic. The pedestrian and cyclist short cut to Cardiff across the barrage finally opened to the public on Friday 27 June 2008. Barrett was one of the first to cross, walking to work at the Assembly and she described the experience as "invigorating".

Senedd
Preceded by New post	Assembly Member for Cardiff South and Penarth; 1999–2011	Succeeded by Vaughan Gething
Preceded by New post	Assembly Commission; 2007–2011	Succeeded by Sandy Mewies
