= Shelley Miranda Barrett =

Welsh actress

- Born: 1974 (age 51–52); Penarth, Wales
- Other name: Shelley Norton
- Occupation: Business proprietor
- Partner: Liam Curtin
- Children: 3

Shelley Miranda Barrett (born 1974), previously known as Shelley Norton, is a Welsh actress, best known for her role as Mandy in the BBC Wales television series Satellite City. She is also the founder of Shelley Barrett Management and The Talent Shack.

Barrett was born in Penarth and is the daughter of politician Lorraine Barrett and music industry agent Paul Barrett. Her brother, Lincoln, is High Contrast. She was educated at Stanwell Comprehensive School and Coleg Glan Hafren. She married the actor Richard Norton in 2002, at Albertson's Chapel on Sunset Boulevard; the couple met while appearing in a play entitled Killing Kangaroos at the Sherman Theatre, Cardiff. They separated in 2015.

Barrett lived for a while in Australia and returned to Wales to work at the Wales Millennium Centre.

In 2011, under the name Shelley Barrett-Norton, she launched The Big Talent School and Agency with Leigh-Ann Regan. In 2016, she opened The Talent Shack and established Shelley Barrett Management. Barrett has three children. In 2014, she established Penarth Soul Club, DJing with her partner Liam Curtin. They ran regular club nights in Penarth until 2021 and also presented a Radio Cardiff show for several years. The final Penarth Soul Club night was held at the Wales Millennium Centre in 2022 as part of the Llais festival.

== Television ==
- Satellite City (1996)
- High Hopes: Saving Private Ryan (1999)
- Summer Rain (2001)
- Casualty (2001)
