= Islwyn Morris =

Welsh-speaking actor and director

Islwyn Morris (7th May 1920 – 26 April 2011) was a Welsh-speaking actor and director, best known for his roles in Welsh-language television, such as those of David Tushingham in Pobol y Cwm and Idris Vaughan in Glas y Dorlan.

== Career ==
Islwyn Morris was born in Swansea on 26 August 1920 to William Joseph Morris & Myfanwy (née Thomas). He began his acting career in repertory theatre in Swansea, appearing with Maudie Edwards, among others.

During the Second World War, he served with the South Wales Borderers.

His most notable television roles include Dad in Satellite City (1995–1999), David Tushingham in Pobol y Cwm, and Inspector Idris Vaughan in the 1970s sitcom Glas y Dorlan. He also appeared extensively on English-language television, in series such as Z-Cars, The District Nurse and High Hopes. His radio roles include the BBC Radio Wales soap opera Station Road, and Mr Pritchard in the 2003 BBC production of Under Milk Wood.

He died aged 90, on 26 April 2011. BBC Wales director Keith Jones described him as one of Wales' most loved actors.
