= Protein (film) =

2024 film directed by Tony Burke

- Film poster
- Directed by: Tony Burke
- Written by: Tony Burke
- Starring: Craig Russell; Steven Meo
- Production company: Broadside Films
- Release date: August 24, 2024 (FrightFest)
- Running time: 98 minutes
- Country: United Kingdom
- Language: English
- Box office: $2,183

Protein is a 2024 crime thriller film directed by Tony Burke (in his feature debut), based on his 2014 short film of the same name. It stars Craig Russell, Steven Meo, Andrea Hall, and Charles Dale.

== Premise ==
Sion, a traumatized ex-soldier and serial killer, returns to South Wales. There, he becomes gym-obsessed and eats the protein-rich flesh of a local drug dealer, sparking a war between rival gangs.

== Cast ==
- Craig Russell as Sion
- Steven Meo as Kev
- Kai Owen as Dwayne
- Ross O'Hennessy as Nik
- Richard Elis as Big Tim
- Gareth John Bale as Gary
- Andrea Hall as Detective Patch
- Charles Dale as Detective Stanton
- Richard Mylan as Joe Llewelyn

== Release ==
Protein premiered in the United Kingdom on August 24, 2024 as part of FrightFest.

=== Critical reception ===
Protein was generally well received by critics. Wendy Ide of The Observer wrote: "while it's not the most polished piece of film-making, you have to admire Burke's commitment to carnage." Phil Hoad of The Guardian gave the film 3 stars out of 5, and said that despite being "diffuse and unfocused", "Protein has a hotline into great British bathos." David Jenkins of Little White Lies called it "witty" and "a very solid genre runaround that is elevated by its occasional and welcome lapses into soulful introversion."
