= Robert Blythe (actor) =

Welsh actor (1947–2018)

Robert Blythe (1947 – 20 November 2018), also known as Bob Blythe, was a Welsh actor and voice over artist. He was brought up in Tanygroes St in Port Talbot. He was best known for playing Richard 'Fagin' Hepplewhite in the BBC Wales situation comedy High Hopes.

== Career ==
Prior to training as an actor at the Arts Educational Trust in London, he was a surveyor.

His theatre work included repertory seasons at the Haymarket Theatre, Leicester, the Sherman Theatre, Cardiff, the Liverpool Playhouse, the Connaught Theatre, Worthing, and the Grand Theatre, Swansea. He also toured the Far East, Middle East, India and Europe with various productions.

His work at the Royal National Theatre included Henry IV, Part 1 and Part 2, Henry V, Mother Clap's Molly House, and Under Milk Wood.

He was an associate artist of Clwyd Theatr Cymru where his credits included, the Life of Galileo, Barnaby and the Old Boys, Cabaret, Equus, Entertaining Mr Sloane, A Christmas Carol, The Journey of Mary Kelly, The Norman Conquests, King Lear, Bedroom Farce, The Rabbit, One Flew over the Cuckoo's Nest, A Chorus of Disapproval, and An Inspector Calls.

Other theatre included Badfinger at the Donmar Warehouse and on tour, Ghosts at the Royal Exchange Theatre, Manchester, House and Garden for Alan Ayckbourn at the Stephen Joseph Theatre, Scarborough and Twelve Angry Men at the Garrick Theatre, London.

== Personal life ==
Blythe was married to actress Iola Gregory; one of their children, Rhian Blythe, is an actress. Their eldest daughter, Angharad Blythe is a writer and TV producer.

Blythe later remarried Charlie (Naomi) Blythe. They had two sons together.

== Selected filmography ==
- 1976: The Brothers (TV Series) .... Marsh
- 1980: The Mouse and the Woman .... Corporal
- 1982: Giro City .... Welsh Policeman
- 1982: Experience Preferred... But Not Essential .... Ivan
- 1983 The Forgotten Story (TV Series) .... Martin
- 1985–1986: Troubles and Strife (TV Series) .... Harry Price
- 1986: Whoops Apocalypse .... Guard with Egg in Mouth
- 1987: The Love Child .... Elvis
- 1991–2004: The Bill (TV Series) .... Ryan Moone / Leo Nelson / Philips / Mr. Wyatt
- 1992: Rebecca's Daughters .... Sgt. Bridges
- 1994: The Lifeboat (TV Series) .... George Bibby
- 1994–2006: Casualty (TV Series) .... Gareth Mart / Trevor Harris
- 1995: The Englishman Who Went up a Hill but Came down a Mountain .... Ivor
- 1996: Darklands .... McCullen
- 1997: The Woodlanders .... Young Timothy Tangs
- 1998: The Theory of Flight .... Farmer
- 1999: High Hopes (pilot) .... Richard 'Fagin' Hepplewhite
- 2002–2009: High Hopes (TV Series) .... Richard 'Fagin' Hepplewhite
- 2004: Little Britain (TV Series)
- 2005: Lie Still .... Martin Stone
- 2005–2013: Doctors (TV Series) .... Eric Birne / Derek Dunsdale / Bob Callaway / Gwilym Llwyd
- 2007: Midsomer Murders (TV Series) .... George Miller
- 2007: The Royal (TV Series) .... Eric Darnby
- 2011: There Be Dragons (director Roland Joffe) .... Archbishop Valencia
- 2016: Love Is Thicker Than Water .... George
- 2017: An Ordinary Man .... Grocer (final film role)
