= Craig Russell (English actor) =

British actor

- Born: David Craig Russell; 16 June 1977 (age 49); Lewisham, South London
- Occupations: Actor, writer, producer
- Years active: 2001–present
- Spouse: Kate Edney
- Children: 2

Craig Russell (born 16 June 1977) is a British actor, writer, producer who is known for his film & television work.

== Background ==
Craig Russell was born in Lewisham, South London and raised in Cwmtwrch, a village in the Upper Swansea Valley in South Wales. He attended Maesydderwen Comprehensive School with fellow actors Eve Myles, Steven Meo and Richard Corgan.

== Acting ==
Craig has worked extensively in film and television. His film work includes lead roles in Marc Price's Magpie, the war film The 95th and the psychological thriller Eider Steeps. Craig has also appeared in Marc Price's multi award-winning Zombie film Colin. Alongside Jason Flemyng and Dominic Cooper in Anazapta. With Michael Clarke Duncan and Til Schweiger in One Way. With James D'Arcy, Joe Gilgun and Andrew Shim in Screwed. In Noel Clarke's film The Anomaly along with Brian Cox and Ian Somerhalder, and with John Hannah, Ed Stoppard and Warren Brown in Genesis. His many television appearances include EastEnders, Doctors, Is Harry on the Boat?, Dream Team, Score, Belonging, High Hopes, Battlefield Britain and Fish Out of Water. Craig played Detective Inspector Mark Gascoyne in 21 episodes of the Channel 4 soap Hollyoaks. He played the regular role of Clive in two series of the S4C sitcom Anita. He works regularly with comedy director Jamie Adams and can be seen in his forthcoming feature films Songbird alongside Cobie Smulders and Jessica Hynes as well as in Wild Honey Pie with Jemima Kirke, Sarah Solamani and Brett Goldstein. In addition, he was featured as the main character "Necropolis" in the official music video for Afterglow Of Ragnarok by Bruce Dickinson (released December 1st, 2023 as a single for his upcoming solo album, The Mandrake Project).

== Writing and producing ==
As well as playing the title role, Craig also writes and produces the YouTube comedy web series Grave Danger with Dave Granger. His short film Just the 2 of Us was premiered at the HollyShorts Film Festival in Hollywood in 2011. Canaries is Craig's first feature as producer and he stars alongside Aled Pugh, Richard Mylan, Hannah Daniel, Steven Meo and Robert Pugh. Shot on location in Wales, the U.S. and Vietnam it received its world premier at the Prince Charles Cinema in Leicester Square as part of the London FrightFest Film Festival on 26 August 2017.

== Personal life ==
In 2011 Craig married former Casualty actress Kate Edney. They have two sons and live in Falmouth, Cornwall.

== Filmography ==
Year	Title	Role	Notes
2001	EastEnders	Chris	TV series; 1 episode
2001	Score	Peter Morgan	TV movie
2001	Arthur's Dyke	Darren	
2002	Anazapta	Thomas Bassett	
2002	Is Harry on the boat?	Phil	TV series; 1 episode
2002	The Taxi	Craig	Short film
2006	One Way	Steve	
2006	Cut Throat Alley	Marty	Short film
2007	Intergalactic Combat	Come Mon	
2008	Splinter	Leach	Short film
2008	Spotting the Sunshine	Ed	Short film
2008	High Hopes	Terry Knight	TV series; 1 episode
2008	Colin	Suicide Attempt	
2008–2009	Hollyoaks	DI Mark Gascoyne	TV series; 21 episodes
2001–2010	Doctors	Carl Dixon/Stuart Browning/Keith Clarkson	TV series; 5 episodes
2010	White Buffalo	Soldier	Short film
2011	Just the 2 of Us	Michael	Short film
2011	Screwed	Ricky	
2013	Magpie	Tony	
2013	Grave Danger with Dave Granger	Dave Granger	TV Mini-Series
2015	Convenience	Husband	
2016	The Siege	Davin	
2016-2017	Anita	Clive	TV series; 12 episodes
2017	Songbird	Steve	
2017	Wild Honey Pie	Oscar	
2017	Back	Builder	TV series; 1 episode
2017	The Hatton Garden Job	Prison officer	
2023	African Queens	Mark Antony	Series 2, Cleopatra
TBA	Tangled Up in Blue	TBA	Post-production
