= List of High Hopes episodes =

High Hopes is a sitcom created by Boyd Clack, written by Clack and Kirsten Jones. Produced and directed by Gareth Gwenlan for BBC Wales, High Hopes is set in a fictional area of the South Wales Valleys called Cwm-Pen-Ôl (which is Welsh for 'Backside Valley').

== Series overview ==
Series	Episodes	Originally released	
Series	Episodes	First released	Last released
1	6	2 October 2002	6 November 2002
2	6	5 November 2003	16 December 2003
3	6	10 November 2004	21 December 2004
4	6	16 November 2005	21 December 2005
2006 Specials		4 December 2006	19 December 2006
5	5	1 March 2007	4 April 2007
6	6	11 November 2008	16 December 2008
2015 Special		23 March 2015	

== Episodes ==
=== Series 1 (2002) ===
No. overall	No. in series	Title	Directed by	Written by	Original release date
1	1	"Saving Private Ryan"	Gareth Gwenlan	Boyd Clack & Kirsten Jones	2 October 2002
Two homeless teenagers get more than they bargain for when they break into a council house on the valley's estate. The occupants, a middle-aged, agoraphobic master criminal and his elderly mother, are ready to exact an unexpected justice. First appearances of Fagin, Mam, Hoffman, Charlie, Sgt. Ball and PC Claude Cox.
2	2	"To Catch A Thief"	Gareth Gwenlan	Boyd Clack & Kirsten Jones	9 October 2002
Fagin is distressed when Mam confesses to an affair with an infamous cat burglar, Aneurin Snoddy. Fagin is determined to find out whether Snoddy could be his real father - and whether he could be conned out of his acquired fortune.
3	3	"Do the Right Thing"	Gareth Gwenlan	Boyd Clack & Kirsten Jones	16 October 2002
Hoffman and Charlie are left with a stack of bogus porn videos when a dodgy deal goes awry. However, in the pile is a CCTV tape that reveals the perpetrator of a heinous crime: the torching of the local Big Burger fast-food outlet.
4	4	"Heavens Above!"	Gareth Gwenlan	Boyd Clack & Kirsten Jones	23 October 2002
The trendy new vicar angers Fagin when he asks Hoffman and Charlie to help him collect donations for his new cyber cafe First appearance of Mrs Coles.
5	5	"Primary Colours"	Gareth Gwenlan	Boyd Clack & Kirsten Jones	30 October 2002
Mam, Hoffman and Charlie persuade Fagin to stand for the Welsh Assembly on a manifesto of suspicion and bigotry, and he campaigns from his living room, with the family as his political team.
6	6	"Indecent Proposal"	Gareth Gwenlan	Boyd Clack & Kirsten Jones	6 November 2002
Hoffman is pursued by WPC Juliette Barnfield, and his plan to put her off fails. But terror turns to adoration. First appearance of Colin White

=== Series 2 (2003) ===
No. overall	No. in series	Title	Directed by	Written by	Original release date
7	1	"Pretty Woman"	Gareth Gwenlan	Boyd Clack & Kirsten Jones	5 November 2003
Charlie's mother pays a visit, announcing that she is leaving for Australia to marry a kangaroo farmer who she met on a rugby trip. Will she take Charlie to Wagga Wagga with her? The unity of the Hepplewhite household is threatened.
8	2	"Rear Window"	Gareth Gwenlan	Boyd Clack & Kirsten Jones	19 November 2003
Mam and Mrs Coles fall out big time and the Hepplewhites are banned from the shop. First appearances of Walter Coles.
9	3	"Human Jungle"	Gareth Gwenlan	Boyd Clack & Kirsten Jones	26 November 2003
Fagin is ordered by the Court to see a psychiatrist. The Hepplewhites rally round, and Sgt Ball gives his expert advice.
10	4	"Stardust"	Gareth Gwenlan	Boyd Clack & Kirsten Jones	2 December 2003
Fagin becomes the manager of wannabe pop idols Hoffman and Charlie. Claude and Sgt Ball form a rival duo. Can The Tea-Leaves outwit The Cops? Will the Hepplewhites be whisked off into a world of stardust and riches?
11	5	"Lethal Weapon"	Gareth Gwenlan	Boyd Clack & Kirsten Jones	9 December 2003
An old friend of Fagin turns up, and he feels obliged to help, despite his reservations.
12	6	"Mission Impossible"	Gareth Gwenlan	Boyd Clack & Kirsten Jones	16 December 2003
The Hepplewhite family have a very odd day, encompassing an accident, a trip down memory lane, a mysterious stranger, a daring robbery, a stolen Dickie Bow and a vicious assault.

=== Series 3 (2004) ===
No. overall	No. in series	Title	Directed by	Written by	Original release date
13	1	"Only Two Can Play"	Gareth Gwenlan	Boyd Clack & Kirsten Jones	10 November 2004
Charlie meets Emily, a girl from the posh side of town and guess who's coming to dinner? Hoffman falls for her too.
14	2	"The Italian Job"	Gareth Gwenlan	Boyd Clack & Kirsten Jones	15 November 2004
Hoffman and Charlie are keen to learn some tricks of the trade, and Fagin goes Italian but gets caught up in spaghetti. A deal goes wrong; a tangle with the Mafia; Mam comes to the rescue.
15	3	"Of Mice and Men"	Gareth Gwenlan	Boyd Clack & Kirsten Jones	24 November 2004
Dr Raghaven is called as Fagin faces the final curtain with only 24 hours to live. Mam and the boys are devastated. Sergeant Ball and Mrs Coles are sceptical but Fagin is philosophical.
16	4	"The Accused"	Gareth Gwenlan	Boyd Clack & Kirsten Jones	1 December 2004
Fagin is charged with murder again. DI Piggot from Cardiff hauls him down to the local police station. Mam, the boys, Sgt. Ball and Claude rally round but Piggot is not to be toyed with. It looks like a sewn-up case but have Mrs Coles and the boys some surprises up their sleeves?
17	5	"The Roman Spring of Mrs Stone"	Gareth Gwenlan	Boyd Clack & Kirsten Jones	8 December 2004
The Cwm-Pen-Ôl Am Dram are putting on Romeo and Juliet, and the director, Mr Stone, gives Mam her big break. Fagin suspects would-be thespian Jamie Newman has designs on Mam, but has he got the wrong end of the stick? Sergeant Ball lends his advice, Claude gets stage fright, the boys try out their carpentry skills and Mrs Coles shows off her nursing talents while Fagin is left at home with his thoughts.
18	6	"Privates on Parade"	Gareth Gwenlan	Boyd Clack & Kirsten Jones	21 December 2004
Hoffman and Charlie's friend joins the army but soon goes AWOL. The Hepplewhites hide him under a mattress.

=== Series 4 (2005) ===
No. overall	No. in series	Title	Directed by	Written by	Original release date
19	1	"Invasion of the Body Snatchers"	Gareth Gwenlan	Boyd Clack & Kirsten Jones	16 November 2005
Fagin, Mam and the boys pit themselves against big business and local government.
20	2	"Every Picture Tells a Story"	Gareth Gwenlan	Boyd Clack & Kirsten Jones	23 November 2005
A valuable painting falls into the Hepplewhites' hands. They call on Daniel Gold, an old art expert friend of Mam's for help, but things go wrong. Fagin's mental state deteriorates as criminals and bent coppers vie for possession.
21	3	"As You Like It"	Gareth Gwenlan	Boyd Clack & Kirsten Jones	30 November 2005
Charlie falls in love, but it is not what he expected. Is it just a dream? Mam has a plan.
22	4	"A Touch of Class"	Gareth Gwenlan	Boyd Clack & Kirsten Jones	7 December 2005
A VIP passes through Cwm-Pen-Ôl on the day of the village fancy dress party. Hoffman and Charlie get cooking.
23	5	"Close Encounters of the Third Kind"	Gareth Gwenlan	Boyd Clack & Kirsten Jones	14 December 2005
Walter Coles disappears when investigating strange lights on the Glyn mountain. Has he been abducted by aliens or is there a terrestrial explanation? Mam and Mrs Coles set out to look for him.
24	6	"Uncle Tom"	Gareth Gwenlan	Boyd Clack & Kirsten Jones	21 December 2005
A visit from Uncle Tom plunges the Hepplewhite household into chaos. Ghosts from the past are reawakened.

=== 2006 Specials ===
No. overall	No. in series	Title	Directed by	Written by	Original release date
25	1	"Planet of the Apes"	Gareth Gwenlan	Boyd Clack & Kirsten Jones	4 December 2006
Mam and the boys are worried about Fagin. His mental state is deteriorating - if it can deteriorate any further. His agoraphobia is to blame and to cap it all a certain baboon is lurking in the wings. Hoffman, Charlie, Sgt. Ball and Claude become involved. Mam pulls out all the stops to bring the nightmare to an end.
26	2	"A Christmas Story"	Gareth Gwenlan	Boyd Clack & Kirsten Jones	19 December 2006
It's Christmas. Broke and desperate, the Hepplewhites become entangled in an audacious robbery. Sgt. Ball and Claude are on rapid-response patrol dealing with the festive crime wave, and Archibald Duck is in town. Will the Christmas Fairy wave her magic wand for Mam? Tempers fray, fairylights twinkle and sleigh bells ring-a-ding-ding!

=== Series 5 (2007) ===
No. overall	No. in series	Title	Directed by	Written by	Original release date
27	1	"The Hunchback of Notre Dame"	Gareth Gwenlan	Boyd Clack & Kirsten Jones	1 March 2007
Mam is having a hip replacement in a hospital that is already undergoing a body parts scandal. Claude is in charge of the investigation because Sgt. Ball is away on an anger management course. Back home Hoffman and Charlie are delighted when Fagin meets Esmeralda - a sparkling-eyed Irish gypsy.
28	2	"Dead Man Walking"	Gareth Gwenlan	Boyd Clack & Kirsten Jones	14 March 2007
Hoffman and Charlie invite Kurt Stable, a faded popstar, back home but things go seriously awry. Sgt. Ball and Claude's reporting of a stag night that ended in tragedy offers an unexpected solution to the resulting dilemma. Mam leads them up the garden path.
29	3	"Seance on a Wet Afternoon"	Gareth Gwenlan	Boyd Clack & Kirsten Jones	21 March 2007
A rainy day in Cwm-Pen-Ôl. The tedium in the Hepplewhite household is relieved by conversation - old tales of seaside adventures and family histories. Despite the rain the local lead-thief is about his business up on rooftops pursued by Sgt. Ball and Claude. A seance held for a bit of fun has unforeseen and dramatic consequences.
30	4	"The Outsider"	Gareth Gwenlan	Boyd Clack & Kirsten Jones	28 March 2007
Hoffman is going through the dark night of the soul! He meets Zoe and Zac Ashton-Lyme - two of the bright young things of the Rhondda - and gets drawn into their pretentious world. Fagin, Mam and Charlie are concerned. Sgt. Ball and Claude, on the trail of a freemason businessman crook, see an opportunity to nab him! Photographic exhibitions, existential nausea and raw fish!
31	5	"The Fly"	Gareth Gwenlan	Boyd Clack & Kirsten Jones	4 April 2007
Fagin is under threat from Karl Sweeney who has escaped from Happy Valley Mental Hospital. Mam meets Phillip ap Fellini, a maker of religious documentaries, and the Hepplewhites are chosen for a TV reality programme, The Fly. Things go askew as our gang misjudge the mood and Sweeney slips Sgt. Ball and Claude's grasp.

=== Series 6 (2008) ===
No. overall	No. in series	Title	Directed by	Written by	Original release date
32	1	"The Hand That Rocks the Cradle"	Gareth Gwenlan	Boyd Clack & Kirsten Jones	11 November 2008
With Mam confined to bed, the boys must look after her and themselves. It all goes surprisingly well, until a baby turns up on the doorstep with a letter claiming one of the boys to be the father. Mam decides they should keep this quiet, but the boys let slip to Sgt. Ball and Mrs Coles that they are looking after a baby rabbit.
33	2	"I Never Promised You a Rose Garden"	Gareth Gwenlan	Boyd Clack & Kirsten Jones	18 November 2008
Fagin is being tormented by his old adversary, the baboon Loping Ted. Meanwhile, Mam cannot sleep, and decides to call in to a late night radio programme in the hope that the host, Chris Desire, can cheer her up.
34	3	"Nine to Five"	Gareth Gwenlan	Boyd Clack & Kirsten Jones	25 November 2008
A discontented Hoffman and Charlie decide to take up an offer of work from Mr Shepherd, only to be caught by Sgt. Ball and Claude. The work is not exactly what the boys expected, however, especially when they find out that they have to work on the day of the local rock festival.
35	4	"A Passage to India"	Gareth Gwenlan	Boyd Clack & Kirsten Jones	2 December 2008
The Immigration Department, in the guise of Adam Mosley, plan to deport Muktar Rahman, the elderly patriarch of the local Indian restaurant, back to the Punjab. The community rallies around to save him, led by Mam.
36	5	"Internal Affairs"	Gareth Gwenlan	Boyd Clack & Kirsten Jones	9 December 2008
Newly-seconded WPC Holly Nash provides unexpected romance for Claude, as Sgt. Ball is set up by arch-enemy DI Frank Blunt of Internal Affairs. Fagin and Mam warn Ball, but is he being dangerously blase? Hoffman and Charlie get tooled up, but disaster seems inevitable.
37	6	"Saturday Night and Sunday Morning"	Gareth Gwenlan	Boyd Clack & Kirsten Jones	16 December 2008
Mam and Fagin are concerned when Sgt. Ball asks the boys to go to Cardiff for him and pick up an envelope from a Mr Hunter. They warn the boys to keep a low profile, as the city is a dangerous place. Will the pair be able to heed Mam and Fagin's advice and return home safely? Last appearance of Mam.

=== 2015 Special ===
No. overall	No. in series	Title	Directed by	Written by	Original release date
38	1	"Do Not Go Gentle"	Gareth Gwenlan	Boyd Clack & Kirsten Jones	23 March 2015
To begin at the beginning... Mam has gone to that great bingo hall in the sky. Fagin is devastated. Sgt Ball, Claude and the boys rally round. Poetry, Russian spies and starry night skies. Welcome back to cocoa, wheeler-dealing and Mrs Coles' cream horns. Last appearances of Fagin, Hoffman, Charlie, Sgt. Ball, PC Claude Cox and Mrs Coles.
