= Ri Richards =

Ri Richards (born November 1964) is a Welsh actress known for both English-language and Welsh-language television roles. She is best known for playing Moira Price in the award-winning comedy Satellite City and Yvonne Richards in Pobol y Cwm. Her film appearances include a supporting role in Solomon and Gaenor (1999).

Richards was married to Peter Alner, a taxi driver, until his death in November 2016. After he died of cancer, she helped launch a campaign to raise funds for charities that care for the terminally ill.

== Films ==
- Solomon and Gaenor (1999)
- Patagonia (2010)
- Dante's Daemon (2013)
- Denmark (2020)

== Television ==
=== English language ===
- A Mind to Kill (1994; also filmed in Welsh)
- Satellite City (1996-99)
- Mine All Mine (2004)
- High Hopes (2005)
- Casualty (2005)
- Belonging (2006)
- TARDISODE #8 (2006)
- We Hunt Together (2022)

=== Welsh language ===
- Pobol y Cwm (2002)
- Alys (2011-12)
- Gwaith/Cartref (2011)
- Parch (2016)
