= Belonging (TV series) =

- Starring: Eve Myles; Oliver Wood; David Smith; Eiry Thomas; Rebecca Harries; Alun Raglan; Stephanie Parker; Di Botcher; William Thomas; Beth Robert; Alexa Tyler
- Composer: Andy Price
- Country of origin: United Kingdom (Wales)

Production
- Executive producers: Foz Allan; Sophie Fante; Bethan Jones
- Producers: Kate Crowther; Brian Minchin
- Running time: Approximately 30 Minutes

Original release
- Network: BBC One Wales
- Release: 1999 – 16 April 2009

Belonging is an English-language Welsh television drama series, produced by BBC Wales and broadcast on BBC One Wales.

The programme revolved around the lives of the Lewis family, and their various trials and tribulations in the changing environment of their South Wales town Bryncoed and modern Wales. The programme began in 1999, and its ninth and final series started in April 2008 and ended in June. A one-off tenth anniversary special was broadcast on 16 April 2009, centring on a reunion of the Lewis family. Stephanie Parker died two days after the show ended.

== Cast ==
Actor	Role	Episodes	Years
Eve Myles	Ceri Lewis / Owen	85 episodes	2000–2009
Di Botcher	Vanessa Doyle / James	11 episodes	2003–2009
Leila Crerar	Amanda	11 episodes	2000–2002
Oliver Wood	Asbo (Alan)	8 episodes	2008
Sara Gregory / Sara Lloyd-Gregory	Nadine Weaver	7 episodes	2008
Hema Mangoo	Jodie	7 episodes	2008
Donna Edwards	Ruth Lewis	5 episodes	2003–2009
William Thomas	William James	5 episodes	2006–2009
Siobhan Flynn	Amy	5 episodes	2000
Steve Meo	Owen	4 episodes	2003–2006
Eiry Thomas	Debbie Weaver	4 episodes	2006–2008
Louise Breckon-Richards	Louise Kavanagh	4 episodes	2000–2001
Richard Newnham	Student	4 episodes	2004–2005
Huw Rhys	Carl	4 episodes	2006
Ri Richards	Liz	4 episodes	2006
Joshua Jenkins	Nathan	3 episodes	2003
David J. Bremner	Police Officer	3 episodes	2005–2007
Richard Mylan	Joe	3 episodes	2006
Beth Robert	Wendy	3 episodes	2006
Charles Dale	Steve Lewis	2 episodes	2006–2009
Alun Raglan	Robbie Owen	2 episodes	2008–2009
David Smith	Cai Lewis	2 episodes	2008–2009
Stephanie Parker	Stacey Weaver	2 episodes	2008–2009
Steffan Rhodri	Ed Gordon	2 episodes	2008
Sharon Morgan	Nancy Gordon	2 episodes	2008
Stephen Marzella	College Lecturer	2 episodes	2002–2008
Richard Elfyn	Ian	2 episodes	2006
Jetinder Summan	Dil	2 episodes	2008
Gwen Taylor	Margaret	1 episode	2003
Rebecca Harries	Desiree 'Des' Duckett	1 episode	2008
Danny Webb	Pawel	1 episode	2009
Ruth Posner	Zofia	1 episode	2009
Lewis Lloyd	Jake Bardetta	1 episode	2008
Piotr Baumann	Tadeusz	1 episode	2009
Sonila Vjeshta	Kasia	1 episode	2009
Anita Reynolds	Hotel Manager	1 episode	2009
Andrew Phillips	Tom Weaver	1 episode	2008
The Amigos	Folk Band	1 episode	2009
Tia Davies	Kirsty	1 episode	2008
Rhys ap Hywel	Jon	1 episode	2008
Lucas Charles	Marcus	1 episode	2008
Aneirin Hughes	Tim	1 episode	2008
Simon Ludders	Mr. Smith	1 episode	2008
Siwan Morris	Liv	1 episode	2000
Craig Russell	Alan McCoy(2001)	1 episode 2002	2002
Eiry Hughes	Police Woman	1 episode	2002
Zoe Selah Smith	Phone shop customer	1 episode	2002
Ioan Hefin	PC	1 episode	2004
Victoria Plucknett		1 episode	2006
Ross O'Hennessy	John The Foreman	1 episode	2007
Jâms Thomas	Leighton Bardetta	unknown episodes	1999-
Robert Stone	Polish Bodyguard (uncredited)	1 episode	2008

== See also ==
- List of Welsh television series
- List of British television series
