= Stephanie Parker =

Welsh actress (1987–2009)

- Born: 29 March 1987; Brighton, England, United Kingdom
- Died: 18 April 2009 (aged 22) near Pontypridd, Wales, United Kingdom
- Occupation: Actress
- Years active: 2002–2009
- Notable work: Stacey Weaver in Belonging

Stephanie Parker (29 March 1987 – 18 April 2009) was a British actress, best known for playing Stacey Weaver on BBC Wales' television series, Belonging, since the age of 15. She also appeared in Casualty, Doc Martin and BBC Radio 4 dramas.

== Death ==
She was discovered hanged near Pontypridd at about 6 am on 18 April 2009; this is believed to have been suicide. She was 22 years old.
