= Leila Crerar =

Welsh actress

Leila Crerar is a Welsh actress born in Powys Mid Wales and trained at the Royal Welsh College of Music & Drama attaining her bachelor's degree.

== Acting career ==
Crerar played Amanda for 3 years in the BBC Wales Drama Series Belonging, directed by Euros Lyn and Rhys Powys among others. Other television work includes Megan in Doctors. She played the lead role, Gwen, in the feature film Two Way Journey. She appeared in the fourth series of Torchwood aired in 2011 under the title Torchwood: Miracle Day and set both in Wales and the United States. She played Stella in Casualty (TV series) a guest lead opposite Danny Dyer and Abi Titmuss and Hannah in EastEnders alongside Charlie Brooks. Recent TV includes HIM for ITV, and Joyce in the 4th Series of Mr Selfridge for ITV.

Natasha in Three Sisters BBC Radio 3 directed by Alison Hindell

For the stage she has played: Sylvia with Steven Berkoff in the premiere of Berkoff's play Sit and Shiver, Cressida in Terry Hands' production of Troilus and Cressida, at Clwyd Theatr Cymru, Mold, Emma, in Jane Austen's Emma directed by John Adams at the Haymarket Theatre, the northern stage premiere of Tom Stoppard's Rock 'n' Roll at the Library Theatre, Manchester, alongside Hilton McRae and Graham Awly, Emilia in Frantic Assembly's award-winning Othello at the Lyric Theatre Hammersmith, with Jimmy Akingbola as Othello, Christina in Headlong theatre company's much acclaimed autumn production Decade directed by Rupert Goold, at St Katharine Docks. In 2012 she played Portia in Merchant of Venice directed by Natalie Abrahami. In 2013 she was scheduled to play Lady Macbeth at the Tron Theatre Glasgow, and Perth, directed by Rachel O'Riordan. Toured with Frantic Assembly playing Emilia in 2015 restaged Othello and then played the Lyric Theatre Hammersmith. Recently played Nora in A Dolls House directed by Rachel O'Riordan.

Crerar is an active member of The Factory Theatre Company. Other Factory members include Alex Hassell, Catherine Bailey, Alan Morrissey, John Hopkins and Laura Rees. She is also a joint founder of the physical theatre company The Likes Of Us along with Kate Webster and Lyndsey Marshal, performing in productions at the Roundhouse, Chalk Farm, London and the Arcola Theatre, Hackney, London. She is also a member of Baz Productions, whose director is Sarah Bedi. In 2013 she performed in Prophesy, an Arts Council England-funded production devised by the company.
