= Satellite City =

- Genre: Sitcom
- Written by: Boyd Clack; Jane Clack
- Starring: Boyd Clack; Ri Richards; Michael Neill; Islwyn Morris; Rhodri Hugh; Shelley Miranda Barrett; Einir Sion; Kirsten Clark
- Country of origin: United Kingdom
- Original language: English
- No. of series: 3
- No. of episodes: 20 (inc. pilot)

Production
- Running time: 30–60 minutes
- Production company: Fiction Factory

Original release
- Network: BBC One Wales
- Release: 12 December 1995 – 3 March 1999

Satellite City is a Welsh sitcom, originally a radio show on BBC Radio Wales in 1994 and later a TV version produced by Fiction Films for BBC Wales and first broadcast in 1996.

A pilot, eighteen 30-minute episodes and a one-hour special were made in all. The pilot was significantly different from the remainder of the series, portraying Idris, one of the main characters, as senile and deluded into believing that clothes pegs were talking to him.

In 1999, the series won a BAFTA Cymru Award for Best Light Entertainment.

== Synopsis ==
The setting was an imaginary small town in the South Wales Valleys. The plot centred on the arrival of Randy (Michael Neill), an American visitor, who was taken in as a lodger by the Price family, but had to share a bed with pensioner Idris (Islwyn Morris). Randy soon formed a relationship with local girl Mandy (Shelley Miranda Barrett). The other main characters were Idris's son, Gwynne (played by Boyd Clack, who also co-wrote the series), Gwynne's wife Moira (Ri Richards), barman Dai (Rhodri Hugh), and Mandy's friend Bridget (Einir Sion), replaced in the final series by the character of Donna (Kirsten Clark). In the final episode Randy moved into his own house with Mandy. There are continual references to Idris's pet ferret Sylvester, which he eventually discovers is female.

The reason for the title is explained in the first episode: the district had been used for the initial testing of satellite dishes, but when the time came to return the dishes or pay for the service, no one returned them and no one paid. Satellite City thus suggests a run-down area.

== Cast ==
- Michael Neill as Randy
- Islwyn Morris as Idris
- Shelley Miranda Barrett as Mandy
- Boyd Clack as Gwynne
- Ri Richards as Moira
- Rhodri Hugh as Dai
- Einir Sion as Bridget
- Kirsten Clark as Donna
- Brian Hibbard As Spike

== Episodes ==
=== Pilot (1995) ===
Title	Original release date
"Pilot"	12 December 1995
The talking pegs are giving Idris a hard time, so Randy decides to offer some advice, which doesn't go down too well with Gwyn.

=== Series 1 (1996) ===
No.	Title	Original release date
1	"The Lodger"	4 October 1996
English Stan the lodger is dead and Idris wants a replacement, but Gwynne rejects the idea, until an American named Randy turns up, looking for accommodation.
2	"Beer and Pickled Eggs"	11 October 1996
Gwynne borrows an executive toy from work which goes missing at the same time that local bad boy Spike Malarky turns up in the club. Idris eats too many pickled eggs and starts to dream.
3	"Does Broccoli Count?"	18 October 1996
Randy wants a new bed, but Idris won't budge on the idea. Postman Pat takes Moira to Southerndown for a day out, which makes Gwynne jealous, and Mandy and Randy become a couple.
4	"The Other Side"	25 October 1996
Idris is suffering from a bad case of boils, and Randy's alternative treatment leads to a visit from an old friend.
5	"The Rough Get Going"	1 November 1996
Randy starts looking for a job, so that he can stay in Wales, and Mandy's friend Bridget is frightened by a group of dwarfs with machetes.
6	"Love and Rugby"	8 November 1996
Mandy wants Randy to prove that he loves her, but the men want to watch the international rugby match on the TV.

=== Series 2 (1997) ===
No.	Title	Original release date
7	"Hard Sell"	10 October 1997
Money is tight and the bills are piling up for the Prices. Matters are made worse when Idris gets conned by an unscrupulous door to door salesman.
8	"Cutting the Crusts off His Sandwiches"	17 October 1997
Dai has started to act strangely and Randy is spurning Mandy's affections.
9	"The Naked Truth"	24 October 1997
Mandy decides to take her clothes off in public, but Randy is against the idea. Gwynne tries to prove how intellectually superior he is, but Idris just wants to know if beetroot is nicer than ham.
10	"Life Begins at Forty"	31 October 1997
Gwynne's mental state becomes even more erratic as his 40th birthday approaches.
11	"With a Face Like Mine"	7 November 1997
Idris wants to be a grandfather but Gwynne and Moira are not keen on the idea.
12	"Bloody Yvonne"	14 November 1997
Moira and Gwynne's old friend Yvonne Lewis is coming to visit.

=== Series 3 (1998–99) ===
No.	Title	Original release date
13	"Fear and Trembling"	25 September 1998
Dai starts to panic when he finds out that the club inspector is on his way.
14	"Communications Breakdown"	2 October 1998
The Price family struggle to cope with boredom after the TV set breaks down on a Saturday night.
15	"Chronicle of A Death Foretold"	9 October 1998
A fortune teller in the Cosmo club warns Gwynne of his impending death.
16	"Never Too Old"	16 October 1998
Gwynne is convinced that Idris's new lady friend Ellen is either after his inheritance or completely insane.
17	"Survival of the Fattest"	23 October 1998
Moira decides to get fit, and Idris's bladder is playing him up.
18	"13 Terminal Street"	30 October 1998
Randy gets a house and wants to leave, so Idris has to think fast.
19	"From Here to Maternity"	3 March 1999
60 minute special – Moira's biological clock has started to tick.

== See also ==
- List of Welsh television series
