= Boyd Clack =

Canadian-born Welsh writer, actor, and musician

Boyd Daniel Clack
- Born: 7 March 1951 (age 75); Vancouver, British Columbia, Canada
- Occupations: Actor, writer, musician
- Years active: 1989–present

Boyd Daniel Clack (born 7 March 1951) is a Canadian-born Welsh writer, actor, and musician. He was born in Vancouver, Canada to Welsh parents. At a young age, he emigrated with his family to Wales, where he grew up in Tonyrefail, where his family were originally from.

His acting credits include Twin Town, High Hopes, and Satellite City, the latter two of which he also co-wrote. He has also released the first part of his autobiography Kisses Sweeter than Wine, and two music albums, Welsh Bitter and Labourer of Love.

Clack is a supporter of Welsh independence and attended a pro-independence rally in Merthyr Tydfil in September 2019, organised by AUOB Cymru. "I have always favoured Welsh Independence because every country should be independent," he said. "The opposite of independent after all is dependent and to be dependent on anyone or an organisation where that dependence isn't based on love, kindness and genuine care is demeaning." At the 2019 general election, Clack stood as Plaid Cymru's candidate for the Cardiff West constituency, finishing third of six candidates with 3,864 votes (8.4%).

== Filmography ==
=== Film ===
Year	Title	Role	Notes
1989	The Angry Earth	Master of Ceremonies	
1992	Tectonic Plates	Rhys	
1997	Twin Town	Vicar	
2000	The Nine Lives of Tomas Katz	Abel Mularchy	
2000	The Testimony of Taliesin Jones	Toni	
2008	Flick	Sgt. Goldie	
2010	Risen	Howard Winstone Snr.	
2010	Masterpiece	Rod Jonas	
2012	Double Top	Dad	
2015	Under Milk Wood	Mr. Pugh	
2019	Eternal Beauty	Psychiatrist	
2021	Hiraeth	Uncle John	
2021	La Cha Cha	Lance Boyle	
2024	Timestalker	Farmer / Lester	

=== Television ===
Year	Title	Role	Notes
1995	The Final Cut	Hywell Harris	Episode #1.3
1996–1999	Satellite City	Gwynne	Main role
2000	Dirty Work	Colin Trip	Episode: "Changing Faces"
2001	A Small Summer Party	Ken	Television film
2002–2008, 2015	High Hopes	Sgt. Ball	36 episodes; also co-writer
2007	Hana's Helpline	Owen (voice)	2 episodes
2011	Being Human	Bazzer	Episode: "The Longest Day"
2011	New Tricks	Broadmoor Bill	Episode: "End of the Line"
2011	Baker Boys	Gwynfor	6 episodes
2014	The Devil's Vice	Ewan	Television film
2017	Will	Peter	Episode: "The Two Gentlemen"
2017	Keeping Faith	Alwyn Thomas	Episode #1.1
2020	Handstand	Luke's Boss	Television film
