= Walter Wilkinson (puppeteer) =

British puppeteer and writer (1888–1970)

Walter Wilkinson (1888–1970) was a puppeteer, writer and artist. He wrote a series of eight books in which he describes his itinerant performances in villages and towns. He was an advocate of the Simple Life.

== Life ==
Wilkinson was born in Watford, Hertfordshire, in 1888. He was the last of five children born to William and Emily Wilkinson. His father had come from a farming family near Underbarrow in Cumbria, but he had left in the 1870s to become a porter for the London and North Western Railway. By the time that Wilkinson was born, his father had become a clerk for the railway and the family lived in Watford.

Wilkinson attended Watford Grammar School and eventually worked for Cook's Travel firm in London as a clerk in their banking department. In 1910, he left to join his brother Arthur, the only child in the family who followed his dream to be an artist, to recoup after an illness. From 1910 to the outbreak of World War I, Wilkinson travelled with Arthur and his family in a caravan, leading a Bohemian existence as itinerant puppeteers in England for part of the year and living in a villa in Florence in Italy, where Arthur painted, for the remainder. In 1915, the family returned to England, to Hampstead, where they launched the Gair Wilkinson Marionettes, a series of puppet shows featuring a troupe of stringed puppets they had made themselves.

Their whereabouts from when they returned to England until 1918 remains uncertain, but in that year the brothers were arrested for not registering for Army service as required by the Militia Act of 1916. They were imprisoned for the remainder of the war as conscientious objectors.

On their release in 1919, the brothers moved to Gloucestershire with Arthur's wife Lilian, and their two teenage children. It was here in 1923, that Walter decided to make a collection of glove puppets and to tour round Devon and Somerset with a hand cart on his own, giving impromptu performances in villages and towns. It was the first of at least eight trips he did over the next twenty years for which he was to write an account describing his adventures.

In 1926, Wilkinson joined his brother in again in Florence, where their new neighbours were D. H. Lawrence and his wife Frieda who were renting the villa next door. Lawrence wrote a review of Wilkinson's first book, Peep Show which was published in 1927. The book, like the ones to come, was published by George Bless. Vagabonds and Puppets followed in 1930, Puppets in Yorkshire was published, to much acclaim, in 1931 and A Sussex Peep Show in 1933.

In 1931, Wilkinson married Amy Winifred Cramp, a Quaker who worked with international students to find accommodation and resources, which was particularly stressful in the aftermath of war. Her novels such as God in Hell describe some of the difficulties she encountered. With Winifred, Wilkinson toured Lancashire and Scotland. In addition to the tours he made over several months, Wilkinson was becoming well known and was in constant demand to perform with his puppets.

As his fame grew, Wilkinson's outstanding ability to work his puppets made him internationally famous. In 1937 he was invited by Paul McPherson be guest of honour at the 2nd American Puppet Festival in Cincinnati. The Wilkinsons stayed in America for several months, incorporating a vacation in New Mexico, an area in the country which had been attracting many artists and writers. Although the Wilkinsons did return to England briefly, they had arranged to go back to the States when war in Europe looked inevitable. This time they stayed for several years, only to return in 1947.

On his return, Wilkinson found things were very different in post-war England. Many of his own family and those of Winifred's had died in the intervening years, through old age or ill-health. His nephew who had been in the RAF was killed on a practice surveillance in 1942. Wilkinson, suffering a bout of depression, decided to walk around Wales with his puppets but this time it was less about the puppets than trying to heal himself.

He found that few people wanted puppet shows now and although he had lost none of his skill, he was unable to draw the audiences as he had once done before the war. Nevertheless, the Wilkinsons took off for Australia in 1954 for a puppet tour, primarily for school children, at the request of the Rayner sisters. The Rayner sisters had founded the Australian Children's Theatre and hosted many world- class entertainers to perform for children with limited access to the arts.

Wilkinson died on 31 May 1970 at his home in Selworthy, Somerset.

== Works ==
He became interested in puppets while in Italy before the First World War, and tried to revive the anachronistic Punch and Judy show back in England. He created his own characters, carving the heads from wood, claiming that the traditional Punch and Judy was enough to scare children away. His hand puppets included Barleycorn, Uncle Joe, Old Martha, Pretty Sally, Cheeky Pipi, the Rev. Mr Black and the Monkey. He referred to his hand puppet theatre as 'The Peep-Show', also the title of his first book describing his travels with these creations.

He first performed with his brother, Arthur Wilkinson, travelling the country in a caravan. Arthur later set up The Marionette Society, while Walter persevered with hand puppets.

Wilkinson wrote and had published a series of eight books about his travels with his puppet show in England, Scotland, Wales and America. He built a barrow which converted into the theatre which he would erect on village greens, in schools or wherever he could find an audience. He carried his tent on his barrow and spent the summers camping in the countryside. He was a popular author in the 1930s and 1940s, receiving positive reviews from D. H. Lawrence, J. B. Priestley and other contemporary critics. He illustrated the end papers and dust jackets of his books himself with annotated maps; his last published book "Puppets in Wales" also contains some of his drawings within the text of the manuscript. In the later books he is accompanied by his wife, Winifred. They travelled to America in 1937 where they were guests of honour at the Puppet Festival. The following year he also travelled to Canada.

== Personal philosophy ==
His personal philosophy is intrinsically outlined in all his books and set out in his first book:

If I were a philosopher expounding a new theory of living, inventing a new "ism," I should call myself a holidayist, for it seems to me that the one thing the world needs to put it right is a holiday. There is no doubt whatever about the sort of life nice people want to lead. Whenever they get the chance, what do they do but go away to the country or the seaside, take off their collars and ties and have a good time playing at childish games and contriving to eat some simple food very happily without all the encumbrances of chairs and tables. This world might be quite a nice place if only simple people would be content to be simple and be proud of it; if only they would turn their backs on these pompous politicians and ridiculous Captains of Industry who, when you come to examine them, turn out to be very stupid, ignorant people, who are simply suffering from an unhappy mania of greediness; who are possessed with perverse and horrible devils which make them stick up smoky factories in glorious Alpine valleys, or spoil some simple country by digging up and exploiting its decently buried mineral resources; or whose moral philosophy is so patently upside down when they attempt to persuade us that quarrelling, and fighting, and wars, or that these ridiculous accumulations of wealth are the most important, instead of the most undesirable things in life. If only simple people would ignore them and behave always in the jolly way they do on a seashore what a nice world we might have to live in. Luckily nature has a way with her, and we may rest assured that this wretched machine age will all be over in a few years' time. It has grown up as a mushroom, and like a mushroom it has no stability. It will die.

In Puppets in Wales he describes his personal views as a pagan, believing that people should live simpler lives and be in touch with the earth, advocating a religious rite of growing potatoes. He views industrialization as a negative force, disparaging the emergence of automobiles, airplanes, and factory production.

== Later life ==
It appears he spent the war years (1939–1945) in America with Winifred. A contemporary newspaper indicates that he performed at Vassar College, New York, in January 1940. The flyleaf to his final published book states that "During the war the puppets remained in their box, but in the summer of 1947 Mr. Wilkinson took them out again for a journey through Wales..." At this time he describes himself as living in Putney.

He travelled to Australia in early 1954, spending six months in the country, and drafted Puppets Through Australia, but this book has never been published. It is rumoured to lie in a tea chest in a house in Braunton, Devon, some 40 km from Selworthy, along with other drafts and photographs.

His puppets are on display at the Pitt Rivers Museum, Oxford, and were at the Victoria and Albert Museum (not currently on display).

=== Legacy ===
Wilkinson re-invigorated puppet as an art form for adults and children alike. He modernised the Punch and Judy shows, which were becoming scarce, with his own tales of chivalry and romance, blended with folk songs and tradition. His ability to manipulate the glove puppets was impressive. For example, the glove puppets themselves worked marionettes, moved furniture around the stage or lit candles, all on a stage a few feet wide. On occasions Wilkinson was able to work five puppets and accompany himself on the harmonica all at the same time.

All that is left of his puppet shows is one short piece of film produced by Pathé news which still exists showing Walter, Arthur and his wife giving a performance of the marionettes.

In contrast his books provide not only an account of his walks, but also an insight into his character, his sense of humour and his love of nature and the countryside. As social history they provide a glimpse of England between the wars, when technology, mass marketing and consumerism was replacing the arts and crafts and horse-drawn vehicles.

Wilkinson was a socialist, a bohemian, and a believer in the Simple Life. He was much influenced in his personal philosophy by William Morris, John Ruskin, Henry David Thoreau and others who despaired at the growing mechanisation and dehumanisation of society.

== Bibliography ==
- The Peep-Show – Geoffrey Bles, London (1927)
- Vagabonds and Puppets – Geoffrey Bles, London (1930)
- Puppets in Yorkshire – Geoffrey Bles, London (1931)
- A Sussex Peep-Show – Geoffrey Bles, London (1933)
- Puppets into Scotland – Geoffrey Bles, London (1935)
- Puppets Through Lancashire – Geoffrey Bles, London (1936)
- Puppets Through America – Geoffrey Bles, London (1938)
- Puppets in Wales – Geoffrey Bles, London (1948)
