= Raymond Bowers (actor) =

British actor

Raymond Bowers is a British actor who has appeared in numerous television series and movies since the 1970s, including Are You Being Served? (in which he appeared three times, as well as Are You Being Served? The Movie) and Midsomer Murders. Born in Swansea, he performed in amateur dramatics while a student at Swansea University, where he initially studied philosophy. His first work after graduation was in rep, initially in Salisbury, before moving on to the West End. He has also worked with the Royal Shakespeare Company. Bowers made his television debut with an episode of The Newcomers in 1967. Amongst the other programmes in which he appeared were The Dick Emery Show, The Good Old Days, Odd Man Out, Come Back Mrs. Noah, Crossroads, How Green Was My Valley, and To Serve Them All My Days.
