= Steven Meo =

Welsh actor

- Born: Steven James Meo; 1977 (age 48–49); Swansea, Wales, United Kingdom
- Education: Royal Welsh College of Music & Drama
- Occupations: Actor; presenter
- Years active: 2000–present
- Known for: Grownups
- Spouse: Eleanor Howell (m. 2012)
- Children: 2

Steven James Meo is a British television actor from Coelbren, Wales. He is best known for his roles in BBC Wales sitcom High Hopes (2002–2008), playing Owain Hughes in Gavin and Stacey (BBC), BBC Three series Grownups (2006–2009), BBC Wales drama series Belonging (1999–2009), and as Macca in BBC One series Waiting for the Out (2026).

== Career ==
Meo has portrayed the roles of Owain Hughes in the third series of Gavin & Stacey, Josh in the Torchwood episode "Random Shoes" (2006), and participated in The Big Welsh Challenge on BBC Wales. He appears as series regular “Macca” in the acclaimed BBC Drama “Waiting for the Out” (2026).

He was the last Thénardier of the original Royal Shakespeare Company version of Les Misérables in London's West End, and is an Associate Artist at Clwyd Theatre Cymru.

In February 2021, he appeared in the ITV drama The Pembrokeshire Murders alongside actors Luke Evans and Keith Allen. In April 2021, he appeared in an episode of the BBC soap opera Doctors. He appears in the Sky Comedy "Code 404" as series regular DI Paul Stokes, alongside Stephen Graham and Daniel Mays.

== Personal life ==
Meo is of part-Italian descent and attended Maesydderwen Comprehensive School in Ystradgynlais in the Swansea Valley, in the year above actress Eve Myles. Afterwards, he trained in Cardiff at the Royal Welsh College of Music & Drama. Steven got engaged to actress Eleanor Howell in New York in 2010, whilst he was performing the play Pieces on Broadway, and they were married in Tetbury in 2012. They have two sons together.

== Filmography ==
Year	Title	Role
2000–2009	Belonging	Owen
2001	Holby City	Tony Gadd
2002–2008, 2015	High Hopes	Duane Hoffman
2005	Twisted Tales	Simon
2005	The Afternoon Play	Finn
2006	Torchwood	Josh
2006–2009	Grownups	Grant
2007	Doctor Who: The Infinite Quest	Pilot Kelvin
2009	Gavin & Stacey	Owain Hughes
2009	Two Pints of Lager and a Packet of Crisps	Grant Grant
2011	Baker Boys	Rich
2012	Doctors	Franklin
2017	Porridge	Owen
2021	The Pembrokeshire Murders	Detective Inspector Lyn Harries
2021	Doctors	Steven Hywel
2021	Code 404	DI Paul Stokes
2023	Coronation Street	Rufus Donahue
2023	Sister Boniface Mysteries	Max Savage
2024	Father Brown	Robert Highbury
2024	Protein	Kev
2024	House of the Dragon	Triarchy member
2026	Waiting for the Out	Daniel 'Macca' McKenzie
