= Paul Barrett =

Welsh music manager and agent (1940–2019)

Paul "Legs" Barrett
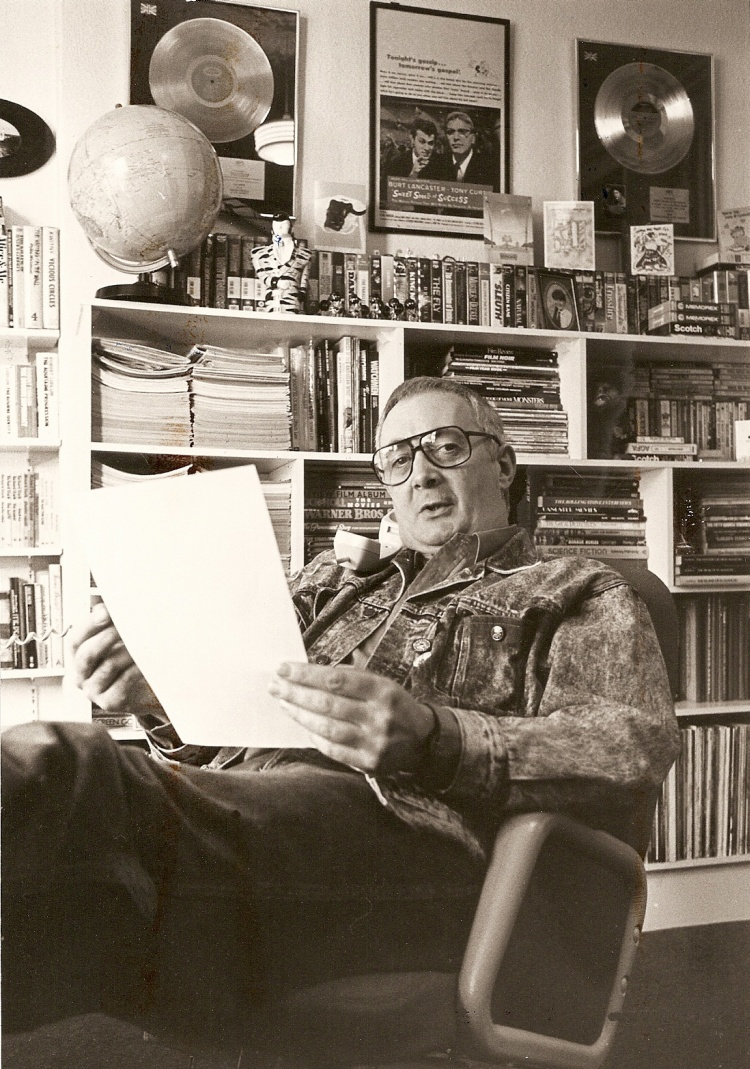
- Paul 'Legs' Barrett in his office

Background information
- Born: Paul Franklyn Barrett; 14 December 1940; Blackwood, Caerphilly, Wales
- Died: 20 January 2019 (aged 78)
- Occupations: Rock and roll music manager and agent, author
- Years active: 1958–2019
- Formerly of: Shakin' Stevens and the Sunsets, Dave Edmunds, Wee Willie Harris, Bill Haley and the Comets, The Jets, Matchbox, Crazy Cavan and the Rhythm Rockers, Screaming Jay Hawkins, Linda Gail Lewis.
- Website: rockabillyhall.com

Paul Franklyn "Legs" Barrett (14 December 1940 – 20 January 2019) was a Welsh agent and manager of 1950s style rock and roll artists, an author and previously a singer, songwriter and film actor. Barrett was the discoverer, mentor and first manager of the singer who would become known as Shakin' Stevens during the 1960s and 1970s, but also represented and promoted many more of the genre's greats during a long and varied career.

== Early years ==
Barrett was born in Blackwood, Monmouthshire, in 1940 but moved to Penarth near Cardiff, at an early age, where he has lived ever since. His father was a brass moulder and his mother was a housewife and author. His parents named him Paul after Paul Robeson the black American singer, actor and radical activist, and Francis after Sir Francis Drake. However Barrett always disliked his middle name and formally changed it in 1961 to Franklyn, because he preferred the name and admired Franklin Delano Roosevelt.

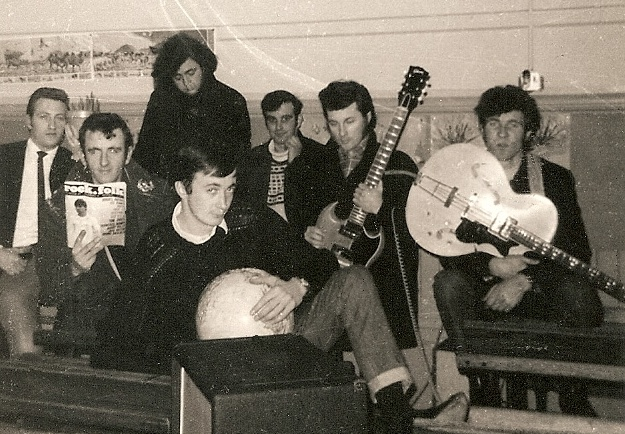
Earl Fuggle (Barrett) and the Electric Poets in 1966

He was educated at Cogan School, King's College, Cardiff and Victoria Road School, Penarth. On leaving secondary school Barrett had several mundane jobs including photographer's assistant, market barrow-boy, door-to-door salesman, council labourer, brewery worker, warehouseman, plastics-moulder, potato-packer, railway-signalman, shop assistant, grassmower, hospital porter and hotel receptionist.

During the 1950s he developed a passion for American rock and roll music. In his spare time he started acting as agent and manager for Penarth's first rock group, the Backbeats. He began promoting teenage dances at the local venue, the Paget Rooms, that would continue until the early 1980s. Barrett was active in promoting events during the annual Penarth Holiday Fortnight each July.

A supporter of American Rock and Roll DJ Alan Freed, Barrett also organised film nights at the Paget Rooms. He also opened a specialist rock and roll record shop on Glebe Street.

To cash in on the 1960s psychedelic movement in British music the Backbeats briefly shifted to performing as the 'flower power'-style "Earl Fuggle and the Electric Poets". Barrett himself took the persona of Earl Fuggle on lead vocals. The idea developed into a performance group named "The 98% mother and Apple Pie West Coast Rock and Roll Band".

== Shakin' Stevens ==
Cardiff teenager Michael Barratt (later Shakin Stevens) was a fan of the Backbeats, and sometimes performed a guest vocal with the band. He became referred to as 'Rockin' Louie II'. By the mid 1960s however, Barratt had formed his own rock band, named the Olympics, then the Cossacks, then finally the Denims, who became a support act to the Backbeats. When the Denims broke up, Barratt formed a new group named the Rebels. Paul Barrett reluctantly went to see the Rebels after a recommendation early in 1969. Although unimpressed with the band, Barrett saw something in their young singer. He offered to manage Michael Barratt on the condition that he left the Rebels and, secondly, find a new stage name. Barratt agreed, left the Rebels and renamed himself Shakin' Stevens.

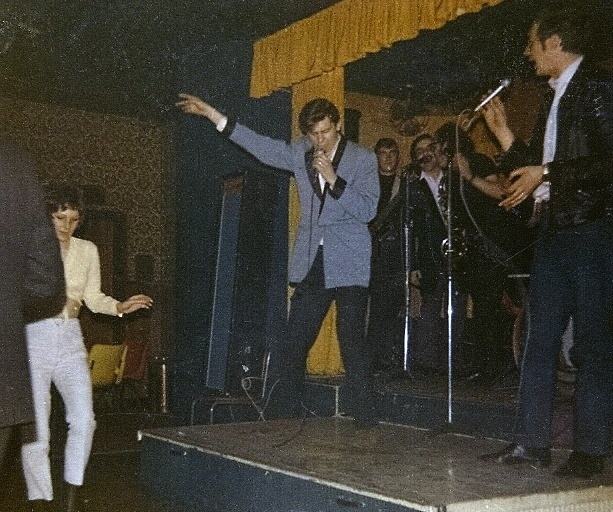
Barrett (right) singing with Shakin' Stevens and The Sunsets in 1974

Barrett would manage Shakin' Stevens and the Sunsets until 1977, even appearing on stage with them as a vocalist. When Shaky began rehearsals for Elvis!-The Musical, the Sunsets used Rockin' Louie as their frontman, until Stevens was free from his commitment to the show. This worked okay until one night at the Rock Garden, London when the audience became disappointed by the non-appearance of Shakin' Stevens and nearly rioted. The venue's management used this to negotiate a rebate from Paul Barrett, a suggestion which nearly ended in a violent confrontation.

The Sunsets persisted for a few more years with Barrett arranging tours of the Netherlands and Ireland as well as many one night gigs in the UK. Barrett negotiated Rockin' Louie's recording of an album titled 'It Will Stand' for Charly records that became a minor seller in European markets and a minor hit in the Southern US states. When Louie finally left the Sunsets and reformed the Backbeats, Barrett decided the time had arrived to sever his association with the Sunsets. Several years later the Sunsets started performing again with original members, but with no further association with Barrett.

Stevens signed a new management deal with Freya Miller in 1979 and went on to national and international success. Barrett became embroiled in litigation for twenty years over unpaid royalties from several albums that had been written and produced under his guidance, but later rereleased to commercial success. In 1993 after 16 years of negotiations Shakin' Stevens found himself in Cardiff High Court alongside record producer Dave Edmunds facing charges of non-payment of royalties from former Sunsets Rockin' Louie, Carl Petersen, Steve Percy and Paul Dolan. The prosecution claimed that the former band members were due a share of royalties which Shaky and his management had received from the reissue of the album A Legend in the early 1980s. The judge agreed and, while the unpaid royalties only amounted to around £70,000 to be divided amongst all of them, the court costs ended up costing Shaky and Dave Edmunds £500,000.

Shaky was willing to call a truce after that court case, Paul Barrett was still angry about the non-payment of royalties from the I'm No J.D. and Rockin' And Shakin' albums. Barrett reissued both albums on a single CD in 2005 under the uncompromising title of How To Be Awarded Two Gold Records And Not Be Paid A Penny in Royalties, complete with sleeve notes issuing a challenge to both Sony and Universal (who now officially own the rights to the two records) to sue him if they believed their rights had been breached.

== Later career ==
=== Manager and agent ===
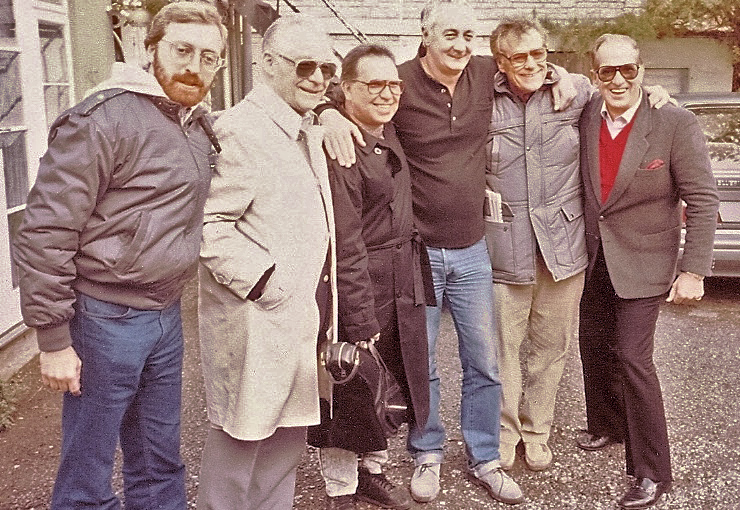
Barrett pictured with Bill Haley's Original Comets during 1980 UK filming of "Blue Suede Shoes"

Ever since first managing Shakin' Stevens in 1969, Barrett continued to be a professional agent, manager and promoter of 1950s style rock and roll artists including Charlie Gracie, Wee Willie Harris, Bill Haley's original Comets, the Jets, Matchbox, Crazy Cavan and the Rhythm Rockers, Linda Gail Lewis (sister of all time rock great Jerry Lee Lewis) and The Class of '58. He has promoted and organised weekend long rock and roll themed events and major concerts all over the UK and on mainland Europe. Paul Barrett Rock and Roll Enterprises is now recognised as the principal agency for the genre.

=== Performing ===
Barrett's spoken and bass vocals were featured on several early Shakin' Stevens and the Sunsets albums, on tracks such as "Oh Baby" and "At the Hop", he also spoke the commentary on the track "Superstar". The album "I'm no J.D." was re-released as "Shakin' Stevens and the Sunsets" in the 1980s and was awarded a Gold Record. Barrett also sang live on stage with the band, adding his vocals to the Sunset's mix.

=== Acting ===
Since the 1970s Barrett has regularly appeared as an extra in several feature films, the most notable being his major featured appearance as the "Table Monster" in the kitsch horror film 'Bloody New Year' (aka Horror Hotel (UK), aka Time Warp Terror (US)) directed by cult film-maker Norman J. Warren. Barrett was also featured in the rock 'n' roll movie Blue Suede Shoes and appeared in the 1987 TV drama mini-series Sins that starred Joan Collins.

=== Author ===
During the 1980s Barrett collaborated with Hilary Heywood in writing the book "Shakin' Stevens and the Sunsets" published by Star Books and W. H. Allen (London). ISBN 0-352-31274-2. Barrett originally wanted to call the book "Rocky Road Blues – The Story of a Rock 'n' Roll Band". However the book was subsequently renamed and heavily promoted as a pop biography, becoming a short-lived best seller. Barrett's book was more a humorous 'warts and all' tale of many behind-the-spotlights events during the band's history and quite different to the several other official biographies.

== Discography ==
=== Albums ===
- A Legend (1970, Parlophone)
- I'm No J.D. (1971, CBS)
- Rockin' and Shakin' (1972, Contour)
- Shakin' Stevens & The Sunsets (1973, Pink Elephant/Emerald Gem) (Awarded a UK Gold Record)
- Manhattan Melodrama (1975, Pink Elephant) (Decca's Emerald Gem Label in the UK)
- C'mon Memphis (1977, Dynamite) (not issued in UK)
