= High Hopes (British TV series) =

- Genre: Sitcom
- Created by: Boyd Clack
- Written by: Boyd Clack; Kirsten Jones
- Directed by: Gareth Gwenlan
- Starring: Robert Blythe; Margaret John; Steven Meo; Ben Evans; Oliver Wood; Boyd Clack; Keiron Self; Di Botcher
- Opening theme: "High Hopes" instrumental performed by Dai Brown
- Country of origin: United Kingdom (Wales)
- Original language: English
- No. of series: 6
- No. of episodes: 38 (list of episodes)

Production
- Executive producer: Maggie Russell
- Producer: Gareth Gwenlan
- Running time: approx. 30 mins

Original release
- Network: BBC One Wales
- Release: 1 April 1999 (pilot)
- Release: 2 October 2002 – 16 December 2008
- Release: 23 March 2015 (Special)

High Hopes is a sitcom created by Boyd Clack, written by Clack and Kirsten Jones. Produced and directed by Gareth Gwenlan for BBC Wales, High Hopes is set in a fictional area of the South Wales Valleys called Cwm-Pen-Ôl (which is Welsh for 'Backside Valley').

It stars Margaret John as widow Elsie Hepplewhite, Robert Blythe as her son Richard Hepplewhite, Steven Meo as Hoffman and Oliver Wood (formerly Ben Evans) as Charlie. It revolves around Elsie's son Richard (known as Fagin) and his dodgy business ventures, assisted by the two boys, who attempted to rob the Hepplewhites' house in the first episode.

== Broadcast ==
The pilot, with slight differences to future cast and plot, was first broadcast in Wales on 1 April 1999. On 26 July 1999, it was broadcast in England on BBC Two.

The series started in October 2002, and in March 2007, filming began on its fifth series.

The sixth and final series, consisting of six episodes, was first shown on BBC1 Wales weekly from Tuesday, 11 November 2008. But, before it aired a report in the South Wales Echo (6 October 2008), titled 'Welsh sitcom set to be axed', confirmed that: "High Hopes will not be re-commissioned beyond 2009, a BBC spokesman confirmed. He said: "The next series of High Hopes is due to go out this autumn. The series has not been re-commissioned for next year". He added that High Hopes – currently in its fifth series – could return at a future date."

A three-part "Best Bits" special was shown on BBC One Wales, starting 20 September; the third episode was on Sunday, 4 October 2009.

In December 2014 it was announced a one-off special would be screened in March 2015 as a part of the BBC Wales 'Real Valleys' season of programmes.

== Series overview ==
Series	Episodes	Originally released	
Series	Episodes	First released	Last released
1	6	2 October 2002	6 November 2002
2	6	5 November 2003	16 December 2003
3	6	10 November 2004	21 December 2004
4	6	16 November 2005	21 December 2005
2006 Specials		4 December 2006	19 December 2006
5	5	1 March 2007	4 April 2007
6	6	11 November 2008	16 December 2008
2015 Special		23 March 2015	

== Characters ==
=== Richard (Fagin) Hepplewhite ===
- Played by: Robert Blythe

Richard Hepplewhite is a wannabe entrepreneur who lives with his mother in the Welsh valleys. Fresh from serving time for second-degree murder at Strangeways Prison, he is claustrophobic and agoraphobic, running his business empire from his desk at the house. He takes the boys in during the first episode. In one episode, he is briefly cured of his agoraphobia after falling over, but he still lives in fear of being "sucked off by the sky".

=== Elsie "Mam" Hepplewhite ===
- Played by: Margaret John

Elsie is Fagin's mother whose husband was captured by Japan in World War II as a prisoner of war. He died as a POW in Japan during World War 2 when Fagin was a young boy. So, she shares a dislike for the Japanese with Richard, she because of her husband's death, he because of their technological advances. Her grandfather died after swallowing a silver threepence that was in his Christmas pudding, not before running down the road for one and a half miles (bearing in mind he was ninety-four!)

=== Dwayne Hoffman ===
- Played by: Steven Meo

Hoffman (his first name Dwayne is rarely used) is a teenage petty criminal whose best friend is Charlie. He and Charlie are apprentices to Fagin's business. Hoffman enters many scrapes, like stealing an iconic Welsh painting "Dafydd ar y Twmp" (or Dafydd and his Hump, according to Hoffman), and trying to escape the clutches of a randy policewoman!

=== Charlie Jenkins ===
- Played by: Ben Evans (2002–2006), Oliver Wood (2007–2008)

Charlie is the second teenager in the household. He seems not to be brighter than Hoffman, and once made a collage of Charlotte Church with no clothes on (or, Charlotte Church's inverted head atop a page three girl's body), and also entering a romance with a Victor (who was eventually discovered to be a girl named Victoria – to Charlie's relief).

== Other characters ==
Other characters include Mrs. Coles, the local shopkeeper (Little Britain regular Di Botcher), PC Claude Cox (Keiron Self), a friend of the family, with a fondness for cake, plastic sex dolls and pornographic films. Also present is show co-writer Boyd Clack who plays Sergeant Ball.

== Pilot and series comparison ==
The pilot and the series in general can be compared:

- In the pilot, the boys knew Fagin already, but in the series, Fagin met them and their knowledge of each other developed very quickly, although he knew them it was not as if he had known them for long.
- The whole of the UK (including Wales) saw the pilot, whereas the series was originally shown only in Wales, but was repeated on BBC2 Wales in 2006, which was also available to BSkyB viewers outside Wales as well.
- Different actors played Hoffman, Charlie and PC Claude Cox.

The series' theme tune is an instrumental version of the 1959 song "High Hopes" played on a Welsh harp by Dai Brown.

The backdrop village seen on the opening and closing credits is Fochriw.

== See also ==
- List of Welsh television series
