= List of Topsy and Tim episodes =

The following is a list of episodes of the Topsy and Tim live-action children's series that was shown on the BBC's CBeebies television channel between 2013 and 2015. The programmes were based on the Topsy and Tim books written by Jean Adamson and Gareth Adamson in the 1960s and 1970s. There were three series with a total of seventy-one 15-minute episodes. The list includes the original air dates of each episode. The series was produced by Darrall Macqueen.

== Series 1 (2013–2014) ==
There were 30 episodes in the first series: episodes 1–15 were originally aired on weekday evenings, over a period of three weeks in November 2013; episodes 16–30 were first aired on weekday evenings, over a period of three weeks in February/March 2014.

No. overall	No. in season	Title	Written by	Original release date
1	1	"Rainy House"	Gillian Corderoy	11 November 2013
A hole in the roof means rainwater is leaking in through the ceiling of Topsy and Tim's bedroom.
2	2	"Strange Beds"	Ciaran Murtagh, Andrew Jones	12 November 2013
Topsy and Tim can't sleep in their bunk beds as usual, because their bedroom is being redecorated by DIY Derek.
3	3	"Double Playdate"	Diane Whitley	13 November 2013
When Topsy and Tim's friends, Vinda and Tony Welch, come to play, but things don’t go according to plan.
4	4	"New Clothes"	Davey Moore	14 November 2013
Topsy and Tim are growing out of their old, matching twin clothes, so Grandma buys them new jeans.
5	5	"Lost Keys"	Dave Ingham	15 November 2013
Grandma and Mossy the dog visit Topsy and Tim, but when it is time to take them home, Brian cannot find his house keys anywhere.
6	6	"Dog Day"	Rachel Dawson	18 November 2013
Topsy and Tim look after Grandma's dog, Mossy, with the help of Tim's best friend, Tony Welch.
7	7	"Marble Run"	Dave Ingham	19 November 2013
Tim makes a marble run with the help of his friend, Tony Welch. Topsy suggests the girls make a marble run of their own.
8	8	"Car Wash"	Dave Ingham	20 November 2013
Topsy and Tim enjoy a morning of fun and games with Brian, but become impatient when they watch him clean the car on his own.
9	9	"Bad Smell"	Dave Ingham	21 November 2013
An estate agent is coming to sell Topsy and Tim's house, but there is a bad smell coming from somewhere.
10	10	"Pet Sitters"	Sheila Hyde	22 November 2013
Topsy and Tim pet-sit their friend Kerry's guinea pigs, Poppy and Bailey, but the animals escape from their run.
11	11	"Big Box"	Andrew Emerson	25 November 2013
Jamie the postman is delivering a big box to Topsy and Tim's neighbour, Mr. Fishwick. Mr. Fishwick is out, so the twins look after the box.
12	12	"Finders Seekers"	Chris Parker	26 November 2013
Topsy and Tim play hide-and-seek with their friends, but Rai gets stuck in the bathroom.
13	13	"Wheely Bag"	Simon Nicholson	27 November 2013
Mr. Rosen visits Topsy and Tim and shows them how to make a house from a giant cardboard box.
14	14	"Twin Twins"	Polly Churchill	28 November 2013
Topsy and Tim enjoy making life-sized cardboard cut-outs of themselves, but milk is accidentally spilled over Tim's cardboard twin.
15	15	"New Babysitter"	Vanessa Amberleigh	29 November 2013
Mummy and Dad are going out for dinner, and the twins are being looked after by their new babysitter, Danielle.
16	16	"Dinosaur Egg"	Laura Summers	24 February 2014
Tim makes a nest for an egg and puts it in the airing cupboard in the hope that it will hatch into a baby dinosaur.
17	17	"Itchy Heads"	Gillian Corderoy	25 February 2014
On the day the parts for the nursery school play are announced, Topsy and Tim find out they have nits and can't go to school.
18	18	"House Buyers"	Denise Cassar	26 February 2014
Topsy and Tim, and their friend, Rai, show Dad their costumes for the nursery school play.
19	19	"The Play"	Davey Moore	27 February 2014
Mummy has hurt her arm and missed Topsy and Tim's nursery school play, The Three Little Pigs, but all is not lost.
20	20	"Old Toys"	Elizabeth Heery	28 February 2014
Mummy asks Topsy and Tim to sort their old toys. She wants the twins to give away the ones they don't play with any more before they move house.
21	21	"Lost Stick"	Polly Churchill	3 March 2014
On their way home from nursery school, Topsy and Tim collect lots of sticks. Topsy names her favourite stick Sticky.
22	22	"Sing Song"	Mark Robertson	4 March 2014
Mr. Rosen's friends teach Tim how to play the ukulele when their minibus breaks down outside the house.
23	23	"Wrapping Paper"	Andrew Jones, Ciaran Murtagh	5 March 2014
The supermarket delivery brings Vinda's birthday card and present, but no wrapping paper.
24	24	"Dressing Up"	Alexandra Owen	6 March 2014
It's the day of Vinda's knights and princesses party. Topsy is dressed up in her red knight costume and Tim prepares a horse costume with Tony.
25	25	"Chicken Pox"	Nicole Davis	7 March 2014
After the party, it turns out that Topsy has chicken pox.
26	26	"Growing Sunflowers"	Gillian Corderoy	10 March 2014
Mummy gives Topsy and Tim some sunflower seeds to grow in their garden. While planting them, Tim loses a seed.
27	27	"Baby Jack"	Chris Parker	11 March 2014
Tony Welch and his mum, Elaine, visit Topsy and Tim with Tony's new baby brother, Jack.
28	28	"Wide Awake"	Tom Stevenson	12 March 2014
It's the night before Topsy and Tim move house, and Kerry's parents arrive for a farewell dinner party with Mummy and Daddy.
29	29	"Moving House"	Dave Ingham	13 March 2014
It's moving day. Topsy and Tim Mummy and Daddy and the removal people pack their belongings into a big van.
30	30	"Remember When"	Catherine Williams	14 March 2014
Topsy and Tim remember some of the wonderful, fun times they have shared in the house.

== Series 2 (2014) ==
There were 31 episodes in the second series: episodes 1–15 were originally aired on weekday evenings, over a period of three weeks in July 2014; episodes 16–30 were first aired on weekday evenings, over a period of three weeks in September/October 2014; a Christmas episode was appended to the series.

No. overall	No. in season	Title	Written by	Original release date
31	1	"New House"	Gillian Corderoy	7 July 2014
Topsy is excited about the family’s new house but Tim doesn’t like his new bedroom.
32	2	"New Pet"	Catherine Williams	8 July 2014
Topsy and Tim love caring for their new pet rabbit but struggle to agree on his name - until they notice his wiggling nose.
33	3	"New Friend"	Lucy Moore	9 July 2014
Josie Miller lives just across the road from Topsy and Tim. When she comes to play, they all make a robot rabbit from cardboard.
34	4	"Busy Builders"	Simon Nicholson	10 July 2014
Topsy and Tim's neighbour, Mr. Fen, is building a new driveway. Lots of bricks are being delivered, so Mr. Fen asks the twins for help.
35	5	"Twin Swings"	Laura Summers	11 July 2014
Kerry and Tony help put up new twin swings in Topsy and Tim's back garden, but Dad loses the bolts for the swings.
36	6	"Sore Paw"	Sheila Hyde	14 July 2014
Grandma's dog, Mossy, isn't feeling very well. Tim suggests they bake some dog biscuits to cheer her up, but it is vet Topsy who discovers what is wrong.
37	7	"Nursery Photo"	Andrew Emerson	15 July 2014
It's Topsy and Tim's last day at nursery school and Tony Welch's dad is going to take a special class photo, but they receive some news.
38	8	"New Bikes"	Diane Whitley	16 July 2014
The twins are excited because Grandma has given them brand new bikes with stabilisers. Tim finds learning to ride his new bike hard.
39	9	"Lost Cat"	Rebecca Stevens	17 July 2014
When Topsy wakes up, there is a lost cat sleeping on her bed! Topsy and Tim try to find out who the cat belongs to.
40	10	"Indoor Tent"	Tom Stevenson	18 July 2014
Topsy and Tim get ready to go camping for the weekend. Mummy makes a fun, indoor tent in the living room with a clothes airer and a sheet.
41	11	"Family Tree"	Davey Moore	21 July 2014
Grandma buys a housewarming present. It's a baby apple tree, and Topsy and Tim help to plant it in their garden.
42	12	"Wiggles' Trip"	Chris Parker	22 July 2014
The twins find a clever way of getting their pet rabbit, Wiggles, into his carry basket so they can take him to the vet.
43	13	"Emergency Rescue"	Dave Ingham	23 July 2014
Mrs. Higley-Pigley's cat, Tiger, is stuck up the tree outside Topsy and Tim's house.
44	14	"Broken Vase"	Lizzie Ennever	24 July 2014
Topsy, Tim and their friend, Tony Welch, accidentally break one of Mummy's vases.
45	15	"Special Cake"	Emma Barnes	25 July 2014
It is Mummy and Dad's wedding anniversary, so Topsy and Tim make a special cake with the help of their babysitter, Danielle.
46	16	"Our Teeth"	Dave Ingham	15 September 2014
Whilst visiting the dentist, Topsy and Tim hear about the tooth fairy from their friend, Josie, and Topsy has a plan to catch a glimpse of her.
47	17	"Helping Dad"	Denise Cassar	16 September 2014
Topsy and Tim wallpaper their parents' bedroom with Dad, but he isn't very good at decorating and they get in a terrible mess.
48	18	"Washing Mossy"	Ciaran Murtagh, Andrew Jones	17 September 2014
Grandma comes over to babysit Topsy and Tim. Before they go to bed, Grandma lets them bath Mossy the dog. It's messy and lots of fun.
49	19	"Dad's Office"	Gillian Corderoy	18 September 2014
Topsy and Tim go with Dad to his office for the morning and meet all the people that work with him at Helpful Drivers Minibuses.
50	20	"Welcome Home"	Mark Robertson	19 September 2014
It's the day Mum returns home from visiting Grandma Molly, so Dad helps Topsy and Tim make a special welcome home surprise for her.
51	21	"Special Invitation"	Rebecca Stevens	22 September 2014
Topsy accidentally spoils the special birthday invitation Tim made for his best friend, so Mum helps create an even better one.
52	22	"Wheelchair Exercises"	Simon Nicholson	23 September 2014
Topsy and Tim decorate a surprise get-well gift for Mr. Rosen, which he can use when he exercises at home.
53	23	"School Run"	Polly Churchill	24 September 2014
It's the day before Topsy and Tim visit their new school for the first time. They are excited, but wonder how they will travel there each day.
54	24	"Visiting School"	Laura Summers	25 September 2014
Topsy and Tim are going to visit their new school and meet their new teacher, but they are worried about getting lost.
55	25	"School Shoes"	Catherine Williams	26 September 2014
Topsy and Tim stomp around wearing their new school shoes. Topsy is so excited, she can't sleep.
56	26	"Teacher Visit"	Lucy Moore	29 September 2014
Topsy and Tim are starting school soon, so their teacher and her teaching assistant come for a home visit.
57	27	"Our Balloons"	Dave Ingham	30 September 2014
When Topsy and Tim fall out over party cupcakes, an accident happens. The twins learn how to behave when things the and it’s Topsy and Tim’s 5th birthday tomorrow.
58	28	"Birthday Party"	Tom Stevenson	1 October 2014
It's Topsy and Tim's 5th birthday! Mum, Dad, Be A Hero buy the twins the best present ever, child and childhood all of their friends and family come to their party.
59	29	"First Day"	Dave Ingham	2 October 2014
It is the morning of Topsy and Tim's first day at school.
60	30	"Remember This"	Catherine Williams	3 October 2014
Topsy wakes up very early on the morning of the twins' first day at school, because she is so excited.
61	31	"Christmas Eve"	Catherine Williams	18 December 2014
It's the night before Christmas, and Topsy and Tim finish decorating the tree.

== Series 3 (2015) ==
The third and final series was originally aired on Wednesday evenings, one episode per week, in autumn/winter 2015.

No. overall	No. in season	Title	Written by	Original release date
62	1	"Camping Weekend"	Dave Ingham	16 September 2015
Topsy and Tim are very excited - they are going on a camping trip straight after school with Mum, Dad. However, Topsy turns out to have appendicitis.
63	2	"Hospital Visit"	Denise Cassar	23 September 2015
Tim goes to visit Topsy, who is in hospital after her operation. Tim dresses up as a chicken and reads her a story in a funny voice.
64	3	"Getting Better"	Polly Churchill	30 September 2015
Topsy wakes up in hospital feeling much better. She makes friends with Molly, a new patient who's broken her leg badly.
65	4	"Coming Home"	Alexandra Owen	7 October 2015
Tim and Dad go to Bellford Hospital to pick up Topsy and Mummy. Dad has to bring some special things into hospital for Topsy.
66	5	"Eye Test"	Catherine Williams	14 October 2015
Grandma takes Tim for an eye test and they find out he needs glasses.
67	6	"Tony's Friend"	Simon Nicholson	21 October 2015
Tim visits Tony Welch's house and meets Tony's best friend, Sam. Tim begins to feel left out, so goes to help Mr. Welch in the garden.
68	7	"Two Dogs"	Simon Nicholson	28 October 2015
Topsy is feeling better, but she's bored of resting. That is, until DIY Derek visits with his new dog, Teddy.
69	8	"New Glasses"	Catherine Williams	4 November 2015
Tim finally gets his new blue glasses, while Topsy spends time with her best friend, Kerry, at a pottery café.
70	9	"Lovely Mossy"	Dave Ingham	11 November 2015
Mossy is unwell. The whole family arrives to support Grandma, but sadly, Mossy dies. Everyone fondly remembers the good times they spent with Mossy.
71	10	"All Change!"	Polly Churchill	18 November 2015
Everything is changing as Grandma gets a new puppy and the twins prepare for the arrival of their new baby brother.
