= Naomi Battrick =

British actress (born 1991)

- Born: Naomi Faye Battrick; 11 April 1991 (age 35); Kettering, Northamptonshire, England, UK
- Occupation: Actress
- Years active: 2008–present
- Spouse: Ben Starr

Naomi Faye Battrick (born 11 April 1991) is an English actress.

== Career ==
Battrick was born in Kettering, Northamptonshire. Her first television appearance was in a guest role on The Bill as Miranda Roscoe. She subsequently won the part of 15-year-old band member Toyah Swann in the 2009 CBBC series My Almost Famous Family, for which she is predominantly known, starring alongside Dominique Moore and Rakie Ayola. It revolved around a family band who were part of a chat show, and ended in November 2009. Battrick then made guest and recurring appearances on television shows including Casualty and as Grace Jacobs in Doctors, for which she is also predominantly known. She has also appeared in films. In January 2014, she joined the cast of BBC One school drama Waterloo Road where she appeared as the new girl Gabriella Wark, and in 2015 signed on for the third season of Crossing Lines as ICC Agent Ellie Delfont-Bogard. Since 2017 she appears in the Sky One drama Jamestown as Jocelyn Woodbryg, later Widow, Samuel Castell.

== Filmography ==
=== Film ===
Year	Film	Role	Notes
2012	Una Noche	Tiffany	
2012	Blood	Miriam Fairburn	
2013	Orbit Ever After	The Girl	Short film
2014	Down Dog	Ella	
2015	Cherry Tree	Faith	
2016	Whisky Galore!	Peggy Macroon	
2016	Brimstone	Older Sam	
2018	The Titan	Reyenne Gorski	
2020	The Postcard Killings	Sylvia	
2023	Bank of Dave	Henrietta	
2025	Words of War	Vera	

=== Television ===
Year	Film	Role	Notes
2008	The Bill	Miranda Roscoe	Episode: "Over the Limit"
2009	My Almost Famous Family	Toyah Swann	Main role
2012	The Indian Doctor	Verity Todd	Recurring role (series 2), 5 episodes
2012	Benidorm	Hermione	1 episode
2012	Casualty	Sheena Jourdan	Episode: "An Amateur Sport"
2012	Doctors	Grace Jacobs	4 episodes
2013	Some Girls	Gemma	2 episodes
2013	Taken: The Search for Sophie Parker	Sophie Parker	TV film
2014	Waterloo Road	Gabriella Wark	Main role (Series 9–10); 17 episodes
2014	Ripper Street	Lily Timpson	Episode: "Heavy Boots"
2015	Crossing Lines	Ellie Delfont-Bogard	Main role (season 3)
2017–2019	Jamestown	Jocelyn Woodbryg	Main role
2019	Endeavour	Dr Naomi Benford	1 episode (series 7)
2020	Flack	Maddy	1 episode
2022	The Serpent Queen	Anne d'Etampes	
2022	His Dark Materials	Death Lyra	1 episode (Season 3)
2023	Partygate	Cleo Watson	
2026	Dirty Business	Leonie Lauchlin	3 episodes
