= Paddington Green (TV series) =

- Created by: Lion Television
- Country of origin: United Kingdom
- No. of series: 6
- No. of episodes: 53

Production
- Running time: 30 minutes

Original release
- Network: BBC
- Release: 28 December 1998 – 24 July 2001

Paddington Green is a British television series, which explores the lives of a number of residents of Paddington, London. It was created by Lion Television and was first shown on the BBC in late 1998/early 1999. It is an example of the fly on the wall television format, with narration by Ross Kemp in the first three series, followed by Todd Carty in the latter three.

== Main characters ==
The following people regularly appear in the programme:

- Harry

Harry has a wig-maker shop, and is also seen working on a revolutionary face cream in the basement of his shop.

- Jackie

Jackie is a transsexual woman in her late twenties, seen working the streets of Sussex Gardens as a prostitute. During the series she undertakes some surgery, and we also get a glimpse of her love of the piano (she later goes on to record her own CD). Jackie is also featured in a June 2000 one-off special called "Jackie's Story".

- Claudia

Claudia works for her father's scooter business, and is trying to embark on a singing career.

- Jason

Jason works as a locksmith, and is seemingly on call all day and night.

- Danny

Danny is a bus conductor for London Transport.

- Dave

Dave is a wheeler dealer. We see him in constant financial problems with his car park business. Later, he takes his hand at antique dealing.

- Dominique and Lia

Dominique and Lia are seeking fame and fortune at the Sylvia Young Theatre School. They are also featured in a January 1999 spin-off documentary 8.50 to Paddington Green.

- Neil

Neil works as an estate agent.

- Kelly

Kelly is a teenage model, originally from Yorkshire. She is now established as an actress known for appearing in Casualty.

- Helen

Helen is a taxi driver.

== Series ==
- The first series comprises 11 episodes, which originally screened from 28 December 1998 to 2 February 1999
- The second series comprises 8 episodes, which originally screened from 9 June 1999 to 28 July 1999
- The third series comprises 9 episodes, which originally screened from 15 September 1999 to 9 November 1999
- The fourth series comprises 8 episodes, which originally screened from 8 August 2000 to 31 August 2000
- The fifth series comprises 8 episodes, which originally screened from 23 January 2001 to 6 March 2001
- The sixth series comprises 8 episodes, originally screened from 5 June 2001 to 24 July 2001
