= Jean Adamson =

British writer and illustrator (1928–2024)

Jean Adamson MBE
- Born: Jean Bailey; 29 February 1928; Peckham, London, England
- Died: 15 December 2024 (aged 96); Cottenham, England
- Education: Goldsmiths, University of London
- Occupations: Writer; illustrator
- Spouse: Donald Gareth Adamson (m. 1957; died 1982)
- Writing career
- Period: 1951–2020
- Genre: Children's literature
- Notable work: Topsy and Tim

Jean Adamson, MBE, (née Bailey; 29 February 1928 – 15 December 2024) was a British writer and illustrator of children's books. She was best known for the Topsy and Tim books, the first of which was published in 1960 and which have sold 27 million copies. Adamson's creations were also featured widely on television in 84 episodes of Topsy and Tim.

== Early life ==
Adamson was born Jean Bailey in Peckham, London, on 29 February 1928.

Adamson attended Primary School in Peckham and in 1939, she won a scholarship to attend Grammar School, though like many other students, her education was greatly disrupted by the war.

From an early age, Adamson had an inquisitive and creative mind: "I spent a lot of time when I was a child, reading children's picture books, peering at the illustrations and puzzling about how they were done. I added my own illustrations on the lovely, empty fly-leaves."

In Autumn 1944, aged 16, Adamson went to Goldsmiths College to study illustration and design. "Art school at sixteen, just before the war ended, was like heaven – I couldn't believe it, drawing all day!" There were only about twenty students there, this being war time. Most of the campus had been destroyed during the blitz and only the art department was still intact. The air raid service had taken over the main campus, and barrage balloons were attached to the buildings and grounds.

At Goldsmiths, Adamson studied the history of book illustration, and learned the whole process of printing. "We had to know about this so that we could adapt our designs to technical requirements. The course lasted five years". One of Adamson's tutors was Graham Sutherland, who had himself been a student at the College."

In 1948, Adamson graduated from Goldsmiths and continued to teach illustration and design at the college for another five years.

When students began coming back to the college after the war, it was still under refurbishment. One student recalled, "The inside rooms resembled the Pompidou Centre in Beaubourg, Paris. All the heating pipes and electrical cabling had been installed, but the plastering was still going on during classes." "At Goldsmiths, carpenters were still putting the windows in, so the students left their desks and sat on the water pipes running along what should have been plaster-boarded walls."

Adamson met her future husband and writing partner, Gareth Adamson, while studying at Goldsmiths.

== Early career ==
=== Little Circus (1951) ===
"I published my first book myself, a rag book called The Little Circus, printed in three colours (by foot) from lino cuts and sold it around various West End stores and bookshops."

=== The Tired Train (1952) ===
"My first big commission was to illustrate a collection of stories by Leila Berg, called The Tired Train." One interviewer described this book as "a BBC Listen With Mother story, and the volume, gaily illustrated by Jean Bailey, also contains some other tales from this popular programme."

=== Rope designs ===
Adamson made rope sculptures and embroidered ornaments: "She did several rope decorations for cocktail bars and in the Black Swan at Belford there is a plaque of a swan made out of plaited straw which she designed."

Adamson's miniature rope designs were spotted in a pub by Oliver Hill, and he commissioned Adamson, and a Goldsmiths student, Desmond Stone, to design a sculpture depicting a Lion and Unicorn supporting a Crown Sculpture for the Queen's coronation. The lion was made from a mile of rope, some wire netting, bamboo canes and wood and weighed half a ton and standing nearly 25 ft high. The couple made a small scale model of string in three days. Then they started to fashion the huge copy of the miniature lion and unicorn.

When asked if she has any worries, Adamson said, "Our only worry is rain. If it does rain we are wondering whether the model will shrink. But still, as long as it doesn't shrink back to the size of our original scale model we are not going to worry too much."

Since its creation, the coronation lion has intrigued scholars and conservationists, who have made attempts at finding, restoring and displaying the piece.

=== Storyman ===
After a year or two of freelancing, Adamson joined a cartoon film unit as Storyman. Adamson said, "I had a lovely time. It was a huge unit in London's Dover Street run by an ex-UPA American – a breakaway doing new modernistic "contemporary work, stylish amusing cartoons, very unlike Disney".

The ex-UPA American was likely David Hilberman, who worked at Disney before co-founding UPA. In c. 1954, Hilberman left America for London and seized on an opportunity to lead a new animation unit at Pearl and Dean, to make cartoon commercials and longer sponsored films. Hilberman's unit produced films such as Calling All Salesmen (1956) and Pan-Tele-Tron (1957) as well as a range of uncredited marketing films.

When asked, what is a storyman? Adamson replied, "they are the people who make up the story and characters for customers to approve before an advertising cartoon film is actually made.

Adamson's experience in the cartoon industry may have played a part in shaping her skills as an author and illustrator: "This time spent inventing characters and stories to be used in films to sell modern goods and chattels informed her acute sense of design, sequence and narrative. The joy and confidence she gained from drawing stylised washing machines, tvs, and vacuum cleaners nurtured her facility for depicting the home setting in an inviting and measured way."

=== Marriage to Gareth Adamson ===
In 1957, Jean married Gareth Adamson and the couple moved to 1 Baillifgate, Alnwick, where they would later have three children. It was in Alnwick that the Adamsons began writing Topsy and Tim. In 1960, an interviewer observed, "The book she and her husband are now busy with will tell the day to day adventures of a brother and sister, and when complete there will be seven books in the series. They are now working on the third."

== Topsy and Tim ==
In the winter of 1960, two twins with black hair, rosy cheeks and zig-zag fringes began appearing in newspaper adverts and on bookshelves across the UK.

Through an agent the Adamsons learned of the opportunity to work for Blackies' publishers to produce a new range of storybooks for the young age range. Their background at Goldsmiths as students of illustration and Gareth's experience as a writer, when incapacitated through illness as a youth, equipped them admirably to embark on the challenge before them." The Adamsons then went and looked at what was currently available in book shops: "We went to look around a big bookshop in Northumberland as we were living in Alnwick and found lovely books about dragons and fairies and witches but absolutely nothing about children in the fifties." Gareth then drafted text and Jean illustrated miniature roughs for the first three Topsy and Tim stories and presented them to Blackie. "Blackie agreed and the couple set to work on the first title. Its immediate success, enhanced by the fact that unusually for the day it was in full colour, ensured that more books followed in rapid succession". "Their objective became clear: to combine a sentence or two of text with an illustration of a small boy and girl learning from looking and doing in a world waiting to be explored. The launch of the Twins Topsy and Tim."

Adamson mentioned the "Out of the Ark" series by S.G. Hulme Beaman as inspiring the 'shape' of the Topsy and Tim books'.

While the Topsy and Tim characters were an instant hit with children, early book critics liked the books for their bright and colourful illustrations and marvelled at their low cost compared to books of similar quality. One early reviewer said: "More suitable for younger children, who listen as mother reads, are two attractive books from Blackie, "TOPSY AND TIM'S SATURDAY BOOK" and "TOPSY AND TIM'S FRIDAY BOOK." Plenty of colourful drawings, an easy to understand story and a low price of 3s 6d, make them very good value. Another early reviewer said: "In Topsy and Tim's Wednesday Book: (Blackie, 3s. 6d.)" you can find out what happens when one morning Topsy and Tim look out of their window and see a black and white rabbit eating the flowers in their garden. This is a very nice story which I am sure you will enjoy." Topsy and Tim's Friday Book and Saturday Book (Blackie 3s. 6d. each) are well designed first readers with good pictures in colour.

The Adamsons' skills were a good complement. Jean commented, "we worked very well together because we respected one another and we had our roles". "I would do the basic subject research and layout and I would sketch out the bare bones of the plot," she said. Gareth would then take over and produce a beautifully crafted storyline. I would then do the illustrations. "We made a very good team." Adamson always advocated for equality in Topsy and Tim. "I did change the names around sometimes if I thought he'd given Tim all the best bits" she revealed. Adamson said the choice of girl and boy twins was a way of ensuring gender equality. "In most of the books at the time girl characters were very much in second place. They didn't seem to be able to get themselves dirty and have the same adventures."

Adamson described the twins as "two ordinary children from a background of the sort that most British children have. And the stories are written to entertain - that is why I think they are so popular, and why the stories about visits to the dentist and the doctor are read over and over again." The stories were thoroughly researched, in order to accurately reflect real life: "they made sure that the depictions of these first experiences were well-researched so that parents and children could trust them."

=== Death of Gareth Adamson, 1982 ===
Gareth died of a brain tumour on 29 January 1982, leaving Jean alone with the daunting task of doing the work of two people. As well as losing her husband of 25 years, Adamson faced financial pressure. "I pretty much wrote non-stop for 20 years. We needed the money." Carrying on writing alone was difficult yet comfortingly familiar. "His death was absolutely tragic. It was nice to have Topsy and Tim though. I could carry on something we had started together."

Around the time of Gareth's death, the first examples of the new Topsy and Tim art-style can be observed. The new art-style first appears as the main art-style in ABC Frieze (1982) and features in some of the puzzles in Big Fun Book (1983).

=== Topsy and Tim after Gareth ===
By the end of the millennium, Ladybird had become the new publisher. Topsy and Tim had: approximately 150 titles to date, with 4 CD ROMs, a 60 minute video and activity playbooks extending the stories into new directions.

"After 40 years, Adamson was still designing and writing new Topsy and Tim books, but she had begun to collaborate with another artist, who would colour in her images. By this point, the stories had moved completely to the new art-style. One observer commented, "It is refreshing and enlightening to witness her sustained enthusiasm in this role and interesting to learn of her recent sharing of this responsibility with the freelance illustrator Nancy Hellen. The last 38 titles, many brand new, reflect this collaboration which was engineered to ensure the continued appeal of Topsy and Tim and to prevent them from becoming old fashioned. This may be perceived as a new chapter in the history of the titles. Adamson continued to art direct the design and layout, also supervised the styling of the whole book whilst Hellen finally created the artwork using bright inks and line to clothe the characters in appropriate modern fashions and locate them in a contemporary setting. The feel is bright and cheerful and whilst Adamson's gouaches are dried-up, in the loft – she admitted that it was great fun waiting to see what would become of the characters."

Topsy and Tim adopted a new art-style in 2009. This time, Belinda Wolseley took over the illustrations, which she based on Adamson's original illustrations.

In 2013 Topsy and Tim live-action production was created in collaboration with Darrall MacQueen Limited. This production first aired on Cbeebies, is now available online and on DVD.

In 2020, to celebrate the 60th anniversary, Topsy and Tim "On the Farm" was republished with Adamson's original illustrations.

=== Original Animations ===
The Adamsons created a number of animated stories for Yorkshire TV. Known examples are Puppet Caravan, The Weather, Tom Builds a House, Pine Trees, and Yorky and Ablam Kish.

Yorky and Abalam Kish: Yorky's Tool Set is described as "A story about the little boy, Yorky, and his magical wooden soldier, Abalam Kish. Yorky has been given a set of miniature carpentry tools, and he has ambitious plans to make toys with them." (NFA Catalogue)

Tom Built a House: "Today's story is about Tom who built a house but finds he forgot some important features." (NFA Catalogue)

== Publications ==
Jean illustrated and authored numerous children's books in the 1960s and 1970s, such as ABC: A Picture Alphabet (1962), Family Tree (1968), Animal Bounce (1969), Village Green (1972) and The Chestnut Tree (1974). The Adamsons occasionally collaborated on books, as a writer-illustrator duo, for example, in Neighbours in the Park (1962), The Ahmed Story (1966) and Hop Like Me (1972).

Gareth wrote and illustrated a number of informative books, such as Mr Budge Buys a Car (1965), Mr Budge Builds a House (1968), Machines at Home (1969) and Wheels for the Road (1973). He received praise for his modern fables, such as Harold the Happy Handy Man (1968) and Old Man Up a Tree (1963). Old Man Up a Tree 'received praise from reviewers on both sides of the Atlantic'. "Gareth Adamson lets his imagination soar to produce a hilarious fable in picture book form"; "A modern fable, genuinely funny, with uncluttered pictures in bold bright colours"; "Excellent quasi-folk-tale developed with style and humour… the drawing shows keen observation"; "A pointed fable with charming illustrations". These reviews are found in the blurb of Three Discontented Clowns (1966).

In 1965, Gareth won first prize in a BBC Northeast competition for his play, The Patternmaker (1965).

=== Known publications (besides Topsy and Tim) ===
No.	Date	Title	Publisher	Adamson's Role	ISBN
1	1951	The Little Circus (A Washable Rag Book)	Self Published (printed by foot)	Author-illustrator	-
2	1952	The Tired Train & Other Stories	Max Parish London	Illustrator	-
3	1962	ABC: A Picture Alphabet	Blackie & Son	Author-illustrator	-
4	1969	Animal Bounce	Blackie & Son	Author-illustrator	978-0-216-88671-1
5	1972	Cheerful Cookery by Noel Chanter	Blackie & Son	Illustrator	-
6	1972	The Village Green	World's Work Ltd.; The Windmill Press	Author-illustrator	978-0-437-20370-0
7	1974	The Chestnut Tree	Littlehampton Book Services Ltd	Author-illustrator	978-0-437-20380-9

=== Known joint publications with Gareth Adamson (besides Topsy and Tim) ===
No.	Date	Title	Publisher	ISBN
1	1962	Neighbours in the Park (Harrap Flying Foal series)	Herbert van Thal	
2	1966	The Ahmed Story	Whiting & Wheaton (and simultaneously in Canada, Ryerson Press)	
3	1968	Family Tree	Chambers	978-0-550-31218-1
4	1972	Hop Like Me	Chambers	

== Adamsons' original Yorkshire TV productions ==
Series	Title	Production company	Program	Production Date	BFI Identifier
Yorky and Ablam Kish	Yorky's Tool Set	Yorkshire TV	My World	8 March 1971	606631
Yorky and Ablam Kish	Yorky's Beach Ball	Yorkshire TV	My World	24 May 1971	606649
Yorky and Ablam Kish	Yorky and the Big Black Dog	Yorkshire TV	My World	13 November 1972	601781
Yorky and Ablam Kish	Yorky's Accident	Yorkshire TV	My World	31 January 1972	657209
-	Tom Built a House	Yorkshire TV	-	23 November 1970	573915
-	Puppet Caravan	Yorkshire TV	My World	17 May 1971	616608
-	The Weather	Yorkshire TV	My World	17 May 1971	616608
-	The Pine Tree	Yorkshire TV	-	7 February 1972	660110
-	Untitled	Yorkshire TV	My World	23 November 1970	596079

=== Lost Topsy and Tim Episodes from the 1960s ===
There are traces of 1960s Topsy and Tim TV and radio productions, but details of these are scarce. "Irresistible Topsy & Tim: … featured on Television and Radio, parents and teachers praise them – and children love TOPSY AND TIM's adventures."

== Awards ==
Adamson received an MBE in the 2000 New Year Honours for her services to children's literature and in 2016, she was made Honorary Fellow of Goldsmiths College.

== Death ==
Adamson died in Cottenham, England, on 15 December 2024, at the age of 96.
