= Angela Curran =

English actress

- Occupation: Actress
- Years active: 1976–present
- Television: Doc Martin; This Is Jinsy; The Job Lot; Waffle the Wonder Dog
- Children: 1

Angela Curran is an English actress, known for Death at a Funeral (2007), Jane Eyre (2011) and The Danish Girl (2015).

== Life and career ==
In 2003, Curran had her own one woman show, Happy Talk, broadcast on Radio 3.

She appeared as security guard Janette in 18 episodes of the ITV sitcom The Job Lot which aired in 2013. Curran's television and film work includes Doc Martin as Caitlin Morgan, Nicholas Nickleby (2002), Calendar Girls (2003) as May, Emmerdale as Babs Mowbray, The Iron Lady (2011) and Mike Leigh's Naked (1993), Secrets & Lies (1996), Vera Drake (2004) as a prisoner, Agatha Christie's Poirot “The Hollow” as Frances Simms, (2011) and Mr. Turner (2014).

Curran worked on several occasions with Victoria Wood, including on an episode of Dinnerladies in 1999 and in the TV film Eric and Ernie in 2011.

In 2016, Curran appeared in The Restoration of Nell Gwyn at Park Theatre (London).

As of 2018, Curran has played Mrs Hobbs in the CBeebies show Waffle the Wonder Dog. Curran appeared in an episode of Coronation Street in 2019, as well as an episode of Doctors as Hannah Homewood in May 2021.

== Filmography ==
=== Television series ===
Year	Title	Role	Notes
1977–1979	Play for Today	Sandra / Rita / Woman in window	(3 episodes)
1979	The Mill on the Floss	Prissy Jakin	(2 episodes)
1990	Close to Home	Jenny	Series 2
1999	Dinnerladies	Customer	(1 episode)
2000	Where the Heart Is	Pub Landlady	(3 episodes)
2004	Foyle's War	Nurse Jenny Wright	('A War of Nerves' - Series 3)
2005	Emmerdale	Babs Mowbray	(1 episode)
2005, 2010, 2021	Doctors	Marie Williams / Mrs Janet Davies / Hannah Homewood	(4 episodes)
2005, 2011	Casualty	Cora Ryder / Janice Simons	(2 episodes)
2006	Dream Team 80's	Ruthie Glover	(2 episodes)
2008	Holby City	Jennifer Tennyson	(1 episode)
2009, 2017, 2019	Doc Martin	Caitlin Morgan	(11 episodes)
2011	This Is Jinsy	Jinsy Player	(8 episodes)
2013–2015	The Job Lot	Janette	(All 18 episodes)
2013	Vera	Verger (uncredited)	1 episode
2013	Man Down	Vicar	(1 episode, Christmas Special)
2016	Marley's Ghosts	Mrs Busby	(1 episode)
2017	Hospital People	Geraldine	(3 episodes)
2018–2020	Waffle the Wonder Dog	Mrs Hobbs	(46 episodes)
2019	Coronation Street	Alice Parrott	(1 episode)
2025	EastEnders	Norma	Current
2025	Beyond Paradise	Angela Palmer	(1 episode)
