= The Crust =

British children's television series

- Starring: Sharon D. Clarke; Reggie Yates; Devin Griffin; Dominique Moore
- Country of origin: United Kingdom
- No. of series: 1
- No. of episodes: 14

Production
- Running time: 25 minutes

Original release
- Network: BBC One
- Release: 5 November 2004 – 18 March 2005

The Crust is a British television series about a pizza parlour which was originally shown by CBBC. It was produced by Darrall Macqueen. In 2014, the show was broadcast again on the Australian children entertainment network ABC3.

== Cast ==
- Sharon D. Clarke as Gran'Ma Flosse
- Reggie Yates as Archie
- Devin Griffin as Ellis
- Dominique Moore as Angel
- Gregg Prentice as Tom
- Gemma Gregory as Melanie
- Nicholas Figgis as Jack

== Episodes ==
No.	Title	Original release date
1	"Pizza Professionals"	5 November 2004
It's the annual big pizza delivery race and the Crust is determined to win against Top Toppings. When an accident with the athlete they are using occurs, Ellis is chosen. Can he win?
2	"Pizza Prizes"	12 November 2004
When a cowboy selling candy floss outside The Crust's restaurant steals the Crust's customers, Archie comes up with an idea of doing a promotion which includes hiding a golden ticket inside one of the pizza boxes and whoever finds the golden ticket will win a years supply of pizza. Melanie tries to find the golden ticket so that she can spend more time with Ellis. The cowboy goes into the restaurant to get a pizza (promising to leave town after eating the pizza). The cowboy finds the ticket and won't leave. So Archie suggests the cowboy to challenge Ellis to a game. But if Ellis wins, the cowboy has to abandon his supply of pizzas and if the cowboy wins, the cowboy gets to keep Missy, Gran'ma Flossie's goat and take her back to the county fair. The cowboy wins, but decides to give Missy back, because she was homesick.
3	"Pizza Potions"	26 November 2004
When Flosse breaks her leg and suffers memory loss, it is up to the gang to keep the Crust alive. But when they smash the last jar of special sauce, and Jack is kidnapped by a mob of pizza-haters, can the gang make some more sauce – even without the secret ingredient?
4	"Pizza Promotion"	3 December 2004
Flosse orders Archie, Ellis and Angel to make an advert. But what happens when Angel turns out to be the star of the advert? Meanwhile, Tom and Jack attempt to get Missy back.
5	"Pizza Punishment"	10 December 2004
Archie and Ellis are finally leaving the Crust! But their excitement turns to downfall when Archie's replacement is revealed to be a robot called Susan! And what are her intentions?
6	"Pizza Lost Property"	17 December 2004
When a customer dressed like a giant chicken leaves behind a box, the gang suspects that it is magic! But will Ellis destroy it before Melanie gets her hands on it? Meanwhile, Tom and Gran'ma play practical jokes on the unsuspecting staff.
7	"Pizza Panic"	14 January 2005
The curse of the four cheeses pizza falls on the Crust! Can the gang survive a four-year curse?
8	"Pizza Problems"	21 January 2005
When Jack leaves, a hunk called Gordon replaces him! Will Ellis also leave the Crust when Jack's bad luck falls on him?
9	"Pizza Parties"	28 January 2005
Archie and Ellis are invited to the Blaster party! However, Gran'ma has other plans, including a butler's outfit!
10	"Pizza Popstars"	11 February 2005
Gran'ma's away from the Crust, and Archie and Ellis are about to become famous! Will Tom stop them from pursuing their dreams?
11	"Pizza Passion"	25 February 2005
Archie gets a girlfriend, who is desperate to get rid of Ellis, while Angel finds someone who likes her snappy style!
12	"Pizza Press"	4 March 2005
The Crust is about to be reviewed by Shelley Winters, but will Top Toppings ruin their big day? And why does their plan involve a Trojan Horse?
13	"Pizza Plaster"	11 March 2005
Archie and Ellis are about to leave the Crust! There is just one thing stopping them: the final count on the Pizza Debt chart!
14	"Pizza Panther"	18 March 2005
There is a panther on the loose! Will Flosse catch it? And how will Angel use this to her advantage?
