= Feel the Fear =

British television programme for children

Feel the Fear is a television programme for 7 to 12 year-olds broadcast on CITV in the United Kingdom. The show centres on the two presenters, Holly Willoughby and Steve Wilson, setting each other challenges to test their nerve. It uses common phobias, such as the fear of heights and the dark, as the basis. It was overseen by popular tv mental health expert, Anjula Mutanda. It was produced by Darrall Macqueen.

== Show Format ==
The shows are broadcast alternately: one week Holly will set Steve a fear to face and the next week Steve will present a challenge to Holly. The 'boys v girls' idea is a sub-theme of the programme. Whoever is facing their fear completes three challenges over two days, two on day one and another on day two. These increase in difficulty as they progress, and the final challenge really determines whether the fear has been overcome or not.

== Other Features ==
During the challenges a phobia expert, Anjula Mutanda, monitors the heartbeat of the contestant in order to find out whether they are 'feeling the fear'. There is also a 'body burst' section, in which Anjula explains, with the aid of an animated sequence, the science behind the fears and the body's reactions to these.

== Episode list ==
Below is a list of the episodes broadcast, in transmission order.

- Holly vs Flying
- Steve vs Stings
- Holly vs Rollercoasters
- Steve vs Sharks
- Holly vs Snakes
- Steve vs The Dark
- Holly vs Stage Fright
- Steve vs Spiders
- Holly vs The Deep
- Steve vs Bulls
- Holly vs Rats
- Steve vs Heights
- Boys vs Girls

== Broadcast Details ==
November 2005 onwards

- Day: Mondays
- Time: 4:30pm–5:00pm
- Channel: ITV Network (CITV)

January 2006 onwards

- Day: Mondays
- Time: 4:00pm–4:30pm
- Channel: ITV Network (CITV)

April 2006 onwards

- Day: Sundays
- Time: 10:30am–11:00am
- Channel: CITV

October 2006 half term

- Day: Weekdays
- Time: 11:00am–10:30am
- Channel: CITV

February 2007 and onwards

- Day: Weekends
- Time: 5:30-6:00
- Channel: CITV

January 2008 and onwards

- Day: Weekdays
- Time: 5:30 -6:00
- Channel: CITV
