= Waffle the Wonder Dog =

British children's television series

- Created by: Billy Macqueen; Catherine Williams; Maddy Darrall
- Country of origin: United Kingdom
- No. of series: 4
- No. of episodes: 60

Production
- Running time: 11 minutes, 15 minutes (Xmas 2018 special)
- Production companies: Darrall Macqueen; Ingenious Media

Original release
- Network: BBC One, CBeebies
- Release: 26 February 2018 – 5 April 2020

Waffle the Wonder Dog is a British live action children's television series produced by Darrall Macqueen on BBC One and for series 1-3 and later on CBeebies for series 4. It is aimed at four to seven year olds The programme was first broadcast on 26 February 2018. The Show has also aired on TVOKids in Canada.

== Synopsis ==
Waffle was a talking dog (a red miniature poodle), who was adopted by the Brooklyn-Bell blended family after they find him in their new house. Waffle always caused trouble, especially with cat-loving neighbour Mrs Hobbs.

== Cast ==
Cast list of Waffle the Wonder Dog
| Actor | Character | | | | |
| Actor | Character | 1 | 2 | 3 | 4 |
|---|---|---|---|---|---|
| Rufus Hound | Waffle | Main | Main | Main | Main |
| Tahliya Lowles | Evie | Main | Main | Main | Main |
| Ellis-James Naylor | Doug | Main | Main | Main | Main |
| Andrea Valls | Jess | Main | Main | Main | Main |
| James Merry | Simon | Main | Main | Main | Main |
| Angela Curran | Mrs. Hobbs | Main | Main | Main | Main |
| Paul Ryan | Gramps | Main | Main | Main | Main |
| Jason Barnett | Mr Nolan | —N/a | —N/a | Main | Main |
| Rhiannon Harper-Rafferty | Miss. Berrington | —N/a | Guest | Main | Main |
| John Biggins | Mr. Metcalfe | Guest | Guest | Recurring | Recurring |
| Jack McGinn | Mr. O'Donnell | —N/a | Guest | Recurring | Recurring |
| Sharon D Clarke | Gram | —N/a | —N/a | Recurring | Recurring |
| Roger Griffiths | Grand | —N/a | —N/a | Recurring | Recurring |
| Eloise Joseph | Zoe | Recurring | Guest | —N/a | Recurring |
| Natey Jones | Callum | —N/a | —N/a | —N/a | Recurring |
| Shyam Bhatt | AJ | Recurring | Recurring | Recurring | Recurring |
| Anjika Dyal | Anaya | Recurring | Recurring | —N/a | —N/a |
| Bay Cooper | Anaya | —N/a | —N/a | Recurring | Recurring |
| Husaam Kiani | Ali | Recurring | Recurring | —N/a | —N/a |
| Anna Clarke | Angela | Guest | —N/a | Recurring | Recurring |
| Susie Donkin | Connie | —N/a | Recurring | Recurring | Recurring |
| Guy Burgess | Mr. Meagre | Guest | Guest | —N/a | —N/a |
| Indica Watson | Poppy Essam | Guest | —N/a | —N/a | —N/a |
| James Palmer | Zac Essam | Guest | —N/a | —N/a | —N/a |
| Melissa James | Sophia Essam | Guest | —N/a | —N/a | —N/a |
| Dhirren Farmer | Rowan Essam | Guest | —N/a | —N/a | —N/a |
| Phil Nice | Mr. Willow | Recurring | Guest | —N/a | —N/a |
| Richard Drabble | Mr. Hobbs | —N/a | —N/a | —N/a | Guest |
| Alexander Tol | Nate | —N/a | —N/a | —N/a | Guest |
| Jayda Moore | Sharon (Delivery Driver) | —N/a | —N/a | Guest | —N/a |
| Tom Roe | Mr. Anderson | —N/a | Guest | —N/a | Recurring |
| Zachary Hunt | Mr. Bowen | —N/a | —N/a | Guest | —N/a |
| Nathan Parkinson | Mr. Owen | —N/a | —N/a | Guest | —N/a |
| Rachael Chishlom | Monica | —N/a | Guest | —N/a | —N/a |
| Adam Longworth | Pickles | Guest | Guest | —N/a | —N/a |

== Episode listing ==
=== Series 1 (2018) ===
The fifteen episodes of the first series were first broadcast from 26 February to 16 March 2018. Series 1 was filmed between August and November 2017.

| # | Title | Date of Release | Summary |
|---|---|---|---|
| 1 | Meeting Waffle | 26 February 2018 | Waffle is found amongst newlywed Simon and Jess's wedding presents. |
| 2 | Night Night, Waffle | 27 February 2018 | Waffle's barking keeps everyone awake. |
| 3 | Goodbye Waffle? | 28 February 2018 | Jess and Evie takes Waffle to the vets to have his chip scanned. |
| 4 | Waffle Explores | 1 March 2018 | Waffle gets into Mrs Hobbs's house next door. |
| 5 | Waffle Grows | 2 March 2018 | The family consider getting rid of Waffle, but decide to keep him. |
| 6 | Waffle's Paint Disaster | 5 March 2018 | Waffle causes chaos while the family are painting Doug's bedroom. |
| 7 | Waffle Walkies | 6 March 2018 | Simon and Evie take Waffle to the park and get covered in mud. |
| 8 | Training Waffle | 7 March 2018 | Waffle attends a puppy obedience class. |
| 9 | Waffle and the Good Dog | 8 March 2018 | A well-behaved dog visits Waffle to try and stop him getting up to mischief. |
| 10 | Waffle's Visit | 9 March 2018 | The Brooklyn-Bell family take Waffle next door to show Mrs Hobbs how good he can be. |
| 11 | Waffle Misses Doug | 12 March 2018 | Doug goes to stay with his mum, which makes Waffle sad. |
| 12 | Waffle's Day Out | 13 March 2018 | Evie goes swimming but Waffle isn't allowed to go with her. He runs away to try and find her. |
| 13 | Waffle's Doggy Buddies | 14 March 2018 | Gramps's friend Mr Willow brings his dogs round to play with Waffle. |
| 14 | Waffle and George | 15 March 2018 | Waffle rescues Mrs Hobbs' cat George after he gets locked inside his house. |
| 15 | Waffle and the Swimming Pool | 16 March 2018 | Waffle has a sleepover at Mr Willow's house. |

=== Series 2 (2018) ===
The fifteen episodes of the second series were first broadcast on Channel 4 from 2 July to 20 July 2018. Series 2 was filmed from January 2018 to April 2018.

| # | Title | Date of Release | Summary |
|---|---|---|---|
| 1 | Waffle's Ball Pit Pond | 2 July 2018 | Mrs Hobbs tries to teach Waffle to be good, while the children play with their friends. |
| 2 | Waffle is Unwell | 3 July 2018 | Waffle and Mrs Hobbs are ill, and Jess brings home a kitten. |
| 3 | Waffle and the Kitten | 4 July 2018 | Waffle bakes a cake, and Mrs Hobbs is smitten by the kitten. |
| 4 | Waffle's Pet Party | 5 July 2018 | Waffle amazes everyone at Jess's birthday party. |
| 5 | Waffle's Big Night In | 6 July 2018 | Gramps brings some puppies to the house while he babysits, and Waffle and the pups cause chaos for Mrs Hobbs. |
| 6 | Blockade Waffle | 9 July 2018 | Waffle barricades the doors to the house because he doesn't want the children to go back to school. |
| 7 | Waffle and the Teacher | 10 July 2018 | Evie's teacher visits the house and Waffle chews everything. |
| 8 | Waffle in the Shoe Shop | 11 July 2018 | Evie goes to buy new shoes and takes Waffle with her. |
| 9 | Waffle and the Tooth Fairy | 12 July 2018 | Waffle learns about the tooth fairy after Doug loses one of his teeth. |
| 10 | Waffle's Wonderful Art | 13 July 2018 | Waffle paints pictures of Mrs Hobbs' cat George. |
| 11 | Waffle Tries to be Good | 16 July 2018 | Waffle goes to school with Evie. |
| 12 | Moving Waffle | 17 July 2018 | The family go camping without Waffle, who has his own adventure instead. |
| 13 | Waffle and the Fleas | 18 July 2018 | George has fleas, and the Brooklyn-Bell family offer to help. |
| 14 | Waffle's Sort of Birthday | 19 July 2018 | Waffle has a surprise for his birthday. |
| 15 | Waffle So Far | 20 July 2018 | Simon recalls all of the chaos that Waffle has brought to the family. |

=== Series 3 (2018-2019) ===
The sixteen episodes of the third series were first broadcast on CBeebies, starting with a Christmas special on 20 December 2018, followed by the rest of the series from 1 April to 19 April 2019. Series 3 was filmed from November 2018 to February 2019.

| # | Title | Date of Release | Summary |
|---|---|---|---|
| 1 | Waffle's First Christmas | 20 December 2018 | On his first Christmas Eve with the Brooklyn-Bell family, Waffle learns about Santa. |
| 2 | Waffle at the Kennels | 1 April 2019 | Waffle stays at the kennels while the family are on holiday. |
| 3 | Waffle the Guest | 2 April 2019 | Waffle stays with Mrs Hobbs. |
| 4 | The Legend of Sir Waffle | 3 April 2019 | Waffle floods Mrs Hobbs' kitchen. |
| 5 | Waffle's School Walkies | 4 April 2019 | Waffle walks to school with Evie and causes mayhem in the playground. |
| 6 | Waffle's Great Escape | 5 April 2019 | Waffle tries to escape from home to join Evie at school. |
| 7 | Waffle Needs Quiet Time | 8 April 2019 | Waffle learns that books can be just as enjoyable as noisy games. |
| 8 | Waffle's Playdate | 9 April 2019 | Waffle and Evie go on a playdate with friends, and Mrs Hobbs has a disaster with a home delivery. |
| 9 | PE Waffle | 10 April 2019 | Waffle takes Evie's forgotten reading book to her PE class at school. |
| 10 | Waffle Learns to Read | 11 April 2019 | Gramps teaches Waffle to read. |
| 11 | Waffle the Grand-Dog | 12 April 2019 | Doug's grandparents visit, but Waffle will only leave his new doormat for Grandma. |
| 12 | Waffle and Pepper | 15 April 2019 | Waffle and Jess visit the kennels and meet a new friend, Pepper. |
| 13 | Helpful Waffle | 16 April 2019 | Waffle tries to help Pepper to find a new owner. |
| 14 | Waffle Pop Dog | 17 April 2019 | Doug makes a music kit and the family help him to write a song for the school show. |
| 15 | Sponsored Waffle | 18 April 2019 | The family do a sponsored silence to raise money for the school. |
| 16 | School Dog Waffle | 19 April 2019 | The family take Waffle to school to ask if he can visit the class. |

=== Series 4 ===
The fourteen episodes of the fourth and final series were first broadcast on CBeebies from 30 March to 5 April 2020. Season 4 was filmed from September 2019 to December 2019.

| # | Title | Date of Release | Summary |
|---|---|---|---|
| 1 | Waffle Tries to be Still | 30 March 2020 | Waffle hides in Evie's class at school. |
| 2 | Waffle and the Birthday Wish | 30 March 2020 | Evie gets a dog house for her birthday, and Mrs Hobbs tries rollerskating. |
| 3 | Waffle the Cat Sitter | 31 March 2020 | Mrs Hobbs interviews for a cat sitter, and Waffle applies for the job. |
| 4 | Waffle is a Listening Dog | 31 March 2020 | Waffle works as a listening dog at Evie's school. |
| 5 | Waffle Gets Snowy | 1 April 2020 | Evie, Doug, Simon and Waffle go to an indoor snow arena. |
| 6 | Waffle the Pupil | 1 April 2020 | Waffle starts as a pupil at Evie's school. |
| 7 | Waffle and Benji | 2 April 2020 | Waffle is awarded a prize for good behaviour at school. |
| 8 | Waffle's Homework | 2 April 2020 | The headteacher decides whether Waffle can continue as a pupil, after he forgets to do his homework. |
| 9 | Waffle's Dog Family | 3 April 2020 | Waffle feels left out of the Brooklyn-Bell family, so he goes in search of his dog family. |
| 10 | First Aid Waffle | 3 April 2020 | Waffle's paw is hurt at school, so Jess trains the headteacher in canine first aid. |
| 11 | Waffle and the Box | 4 April 2020 | Waffle wants to find out what's inside a box that's been delivered to Mrs Hobbs. |
| 12 | Waffle's Rehearsal | 4 April 2020 | Evie and Waffle rehearse for their school show, in which Waffle has a singing role. |
| 13 | Waffle Steals the Show | 5 April 2020 | Evie nearly misses the school show. |
| 14 | Waffle Make and Do | 5 April 2020 | Doug and Waffle share memories, and Pepper becomes a new neighbour. |

== Awards ==
In 2018, Waffle the Wonder Dog was a nominee in the Children's Pre-School Live Action category at the Children's BAFTA awards. Also in 2018, it was a finalist in the Up to 6 Fiction category at the Prix Jeunesse International Festival. In 2019 the programme was a nominee in the Best Pre-School Programme category at the Broadcast Awards.

== Waffle's After School Club ==
Waffle's After School Club is a 10 part spin off series that commenced airing on CBeebies and BBC iPlayer on 1 September 2025. The new series follows Waffle, along with his human friends Mr. Brooklyn-Bell, Mrs. Hobbs and George the cat, as they participate in a variety of activities with children at an after-school club. The series features many of the original cast including Rufus Hound, Tahliya Lowles, Angela Curran and James Merry as well as new younger characters.
