= Sibsey Trader Mill =

Windmill in Lincolnshire, England

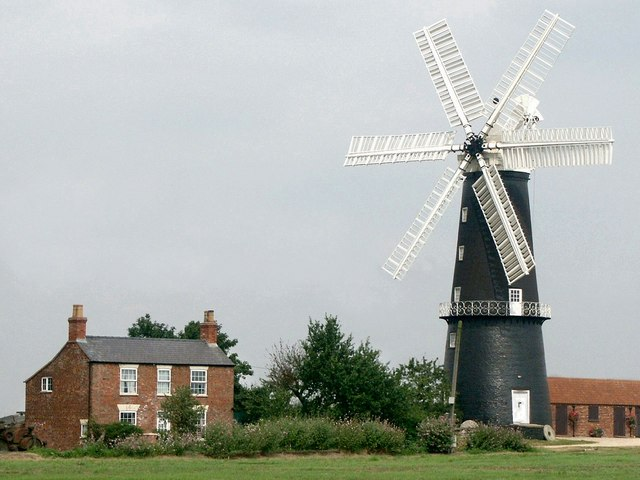
- Interactive map of Sibsey Trader Mill

Origin
- Mill location: Sibsey, Lincolnshire
- Grid reference: TF 34466 50962
- Coordinates: 53°02′19″N 0°00′11″E
- Operator: English Heritage
- Year built: 1877

Information
- Purpose: Grinding cereals.
- Type: Tower
- Storeys: 6
- No. of sails: 6
- No. of pairs of millstones: 3, originally 4

It's one of two windmills which were grinding flour for the local community. Rhodes Mill (the second of the two) has been converted into a house. Trader Mill was built in 1877 by Saunderson of Louth in the typical Lincolnshire style to replace an earler wooden post mill. It is a six-storey tower mill with three sets of stones, six sails and fantail which still works today. It is a Grade I listed building.

The windmill is one of the very few six-sailed mills still remaining in England. The mill itself is not exceptionally tall and in fact stands only six floors high above ground and the height to the top of the mill's cap is a mere 74 feet 3 inches (22.63 metres). However the slenderness of the tower combined with the flat landscape which surrounds the mill give the illusion that Sibsey is larger than it actually is. The slim central tower also makes the sails look enormous in comparison.

The mill worked until 1953 (although with only four sails in its later years) following which it was allowed to fall into disrepair. In 1975, it was formally taken into state ownership and is administered by English Heritage. It was restored to full working order in 1981, by Thompsons of Alford, and produced a wide range of organic flours.

The mill features in the CBeebies series Baby Jake where location filming for the series took place in the late summer of 2010.

In 2018, the mill was badly damaged in a storm and a major restoration had to be carried out. The work was done by Suffolk millwright, Tim Whiting, and completed in 2024.

== Millers ==
- William Clapham (1877–1882)
- Clapham Mawer (1882–1891)
- Thomas Ward (1891–1953)
- Ian Ansell (1981–2018)
