= Baby Jake =

British children's television programme

- Starring: Adamo Bertacchi Morroni; Franco Bertacchi Morroni; Kaizer Akhtar; Matt Katz; Richie Webb
- Opening theme: "Baby Jake"
- Countries of origin: United Kingdom; Ireland
- Original language: English
- No. of series: 2
- No. of episodes: 52

Production
- Producer: Maddy Darrall
- Running time: 11 minutes
- Production companies: Darrall Macqueen Ltd; JAM Media

Original release
- Network: CBeebies
- Release: 4 July 2011 – 15 October 2012

Baby Jake is a British-Irish children's television programme originally broadcast in the UK. It first aired on 4 July 2011. Baby Jake is also available on BBC iPlayer for over a year and on YouTube.

== Production ==
The programme cost £1.85 million pounds to produce, and was funded by the Irish Film Board and CBeebies.

Darrall Macqueen originated the series and produced the animated elements of the programme through JAM Media. JAM Media are an Irish animation studio who also made Tilly and Friends. Maddy Darrall was quoted by the Metro as gaining inspiration for the show from watching her seven-year-old nephew understanding her one-year-old son.

The series is animated by JAM Media in Dublin, and the lead writer is Dave Ingham (Charlie and Lola, The Koala Brothers).

== Plot ==
The show features Jake, a nine-month-old baby. Jake is the youngest of ten children all living in a windmill with their parents, all with their first names starting with the first ten letters of the alphabet.

Each episode features Jake embarking on an whimsical adventure with a host of magical animal friends that include Nibbles the Rabbit, Sydney the Monkey, Pengy Quinn the Penguin, Captain Spacey and the Hamsternauts, and sentient vehicles, Toot Toot the Tractor and Bill the Red Bus. These characters are always doing something related to the adventure that Baby Jake is on.

The show features a child narrator and all ten children are depicted in real life, although Baby Jake is given a multi-angle photographic face on an animated body. Jake's babbling is translated by his five-year-old brother Isaac. Isaac was voiced by a real life five-year-old boy, in a move described by the Guardian as “a risk” since the majority of successful children's television narrated by adults. The roles of Jake and Isaac are portrayed by real life brothers Adamo and Franco Bertacchi Morroni respectively, with Kaizer Akthar providing the voice of Isaac and Matt Katz and Richie Webb voicing many characters, including Nibbles, Sydney, Pengy Quinn, Captain Spacey and the Hamsternauts.

== Characters ==
Baby Jake (portrayed by Adamo Bertacchi Morroni and vocal effects provided by Franco Bertacchi Morroni). He's the show's main character. He is a playful baby who imagines many different adventures.

Isaac (portrayed by Franco Bertacchi Morroni and voiced by Kaizer Akhtar) is Baby Jake's older brother who narrates magic adventure stories.

Nibbles (voiced by Matt Katz) is a rabbit who lives in the forest and is one of Baby Jake's magical friends.

Sydney (voiced by Richie Webb) is a cheeky female monkey who lives in the jungle and is one of Baby Jake's magical friends.

Captain Spacey (voiced by Matt Katz) and the Hamsternauts (all voiced by Richie Webb) are hamsters dressed up as astronauts who live in outer space and are one of Baby Jake's magical friends.

Pengy Quinn (voiced by Richie Webb) is a penguin who lives in the Arctic and is one of Baby Jake's magical friends.

Toot Toot is a magic tractor that Baby Jake rides in.

Bill The Red Bus is a magic bus that Baby Jake rides in.

Flying Pig is a winged pig who announces every episode of Baby Jake.

Mousey is a mouse Baby Jake mysteriously finds. In "Playing House", he welcomes Baby Jake to his pumpkin house for a tea party.

Worm is a worm who lives inside an apple.

Cows are cows who live on the farm and do the Yacki Yacki Yoggi dance with Baby Jake at the countryside. In "To say Hello" Baby Jake waves hello to the cows before saying Hello and Goodbye to Nibbles again, then says bye bye to them. In "Surprising You", the cow gets stuck in a tree and Nibbles tries to save him but ends up getting stuck on the tree as a trick.

Bumblebee is a bee Baby Jake befriended in Making Honey. He makes cameos throughout the series and makes a full appearance in Making Honey.

Caterpillar is a caterpillar who lives in a tree. He joins Baby Jake to wriggle with him and transformed into a butterfly in To Wriggle.

Purple Bees are alien bees from the honey planet in Making Honey.

Giant Alien is a giant alien Baby Jake and Sydney accidentally landed on.

Baby Moon is a moon with a baby face who appears in certain episodes a different moon was used in Tickle Toes.

Paint Butterfly is a butterfly made out of paint in Painting in Space when Baby Jake, Spacey and the Hamsternauts painted the whole planet.

Whale is a whale that Baby Jake and Pengy Quinn befriended underwater.

Sea Creatures are a group of animals who live in the ocean.

Rubber Ducky is a toy duck that squeaks and came to life in Bath Time.

Snowmen are some snowmen who live in the Arctic with Pengy Quinn and do the Yacki Yacki Yogi dance with Baby Jake in the snow.

Snake is a snake who lives in the jungle with Sydney.

Giraffes are a group of giraffes that live in the jungle with Sydney.

Blue Butterflies are some blue butterflies who live on the jungle and snow.

Penguins are penguins that live on the snow and are Pengy's friends.

Elephant is an big gray elephant in the jungle.

Fireflies are a group of fireflies who lit up the whole jungle in Pretty Lights.

The Lizards are blue lizards that show up during tropical adventures.

Rooter the Tree is a whimsical tree with a face in Tickle Toes.

Bulldozer is a magic sentient Bulldozer that appears in Building.

== Location ==
The windmill featured in the series is Sibsey Trader Mill just outside the village of Sibsey near Boston in Lincolnshire. In the programme, it is shown as a large family home with additional floors, rooms and windows rather than a working mill, although it shows full working sails. Wheat harvesting in fields in and around the mill at the time had to be delayed to allow filming to take place back in the late summer of 2010 so that they had the correct ripened wheat colours.

== Series ==
Series one of Baby Jake ran in the UK each weekday from July to August 2011 and consisted of 26 episodes in total.

Series two began on 10 September 2012 also consisting of 26 episodes.

Series two was the last series commissioned. There has been no request for a further series since. The series has also been shown on Al Jazeera.

== Reception ==
The show was relatively popular at launch compared to other BBC Children's TV programmes, occupying all top five positions on the BBC CBeebies iPlayer for a week. In 2013 the show received a UK Broadcast Award. Its rating on IMDb was 5.4/10.

== Episodes ==
=== Series 1 (2011) ===
No.	Title	Original release date
1	"Playing Chase"	4 July 2011
2	"Peek-a-boo"	5 July 2011
3	"Tummy Sliding"	6 July 2011
4	"To Wriggle"	7 July 2011
5	"Tickle Toes"	8 July 2011
6	"to Say Hello"	11 July 2011
7	"Cartwheeling"	12 July 2011
8	"Spinning in Space"	13 July 2011
9	"To Bumpety Bump"	14 July 2011
10	"Flappy Clapping"	15 July 2011
11	"Being Upside Down"	18 July 2011
12	"Playing Ball"	19 July 2011
13	"Making Noise"	20 July 2011
14	"Bouncing Apples"	21 July 2011
15	"To Copy You"	22 July 2011
16	"Jumping"	25 July 2011
17	"To Hum Along"	26 July 2011
18	"Surprising You"	27 July 2011
19	"Sticky Fun"	28 July 2011
20	"To Stompety Stomp"	29 July 2011
21	"To Roll and Ride"	1 August 2011
22	"Swinging"	2 August 2011
23	"Footprints"	3 August 2011
24	"The Boogie Beat"	4 August 2011
25	"Party Time"	5 August 2011
26	"Being Funny"	8 August 2011

=== Series 2 (2012) ===
No.	Title	Original release date
27	"Popping Peas"	10 September 2012
28	"Stretching"	11 September 2012
29	"His Spinning Hat"	12 September 2012
30	"Chasing an Egg"	13 September 2012
31	"Wobbling"	14 September 2012
32	"Spinning a Web"	17 September 2012
33	"Musical Statues"	18 September 2012
34	"A Picnic Feast"	19 September 2012
35	"Bath Time"	20 September 2012
36	"Waving"	21 September 2012
37	"Space Painting"	24 September 2012
38	"Building"	25 September 2012
39	"Jiggle and Shake"	26 September 2012
40	"Balloons"	27 September 2012
41	"Pretend"	28 September 2012
42	"Ballet Dancing"	1 October 2012
43	"Cuddles"	2 October 2012
44	"Making Honey"	3 October 2012
45	"To Knock Knock"	4 October 2012
46	"His Watering Can"	5 October 2012
47	"Cardboard Boxes"	8 October 2012
48	"Pushing Buttons"	9 October 2012
49	"Playing House"	10 October 2012
50	"Gallopy Gallop"	11 October 2012
51	"Pretty Lights"	12 October 2012
52	"Christmas"	15 October 2012
