= Chip and Potato =

Children's animated television series

- Created by: Billy Macqueen; Catherine Williams; Maddy Darrall
- Voices of: Abigail Oliver; Ava Talbot (UK dub); Andrea Libman; Briana Buckmaster; Brian Dobson; Chance Hurstfield; Dominic Good
- Theme music composer: My Kite Music Productions
- Opening theme: "Chip and Potato"
- Ending theme: "Chip and Potato" (Instrumental)
- Composer: My Kite Music Productions
- Countries of origin: Canada; United Kingdom
- Original language: English
- No. of seasons: 4
- No. of episodes: 63

Production
- Executive producers: Maddy Darrall; Billy Macqueen; Stephanie Betts; Anne Loi; Kirsten Newlands
- Producers: Fiona Robinson; Bryan Heidinger
- Editors: Ryan Jobling (offline editor); Michael Hillmer (online editor)
- Running time: 11 minutes
- Production companies: WildBrain Studios; Darrall Macqueen

Original release
- Network: Family Jr. (Canada); Milkshake! (UK)
- Release: 15 October 2018 – 24 October 2021
- Network: Netflix
- Release: 17 May 2019 – 3 October 2022

Chip and Potato is an animated children's television series created by Billy Macqueen, Catherine Williams, and Maddy Darrall. The series is co-produced by WildBrain Studios and Darrall Macqueen.

The series follows Chip, a young 4/5- year-old pug girl who faces challenges in kindergarten and Potato, her snuggly "toy" who is secretly a living mouse. It premiered on Family Jr. on October 15, 2018. The first twenty episodes (released as two segments per episode) of the series were released on Netflix on May 17, 2019. The second half, labeled as a second season, was released on Netflix on November 29, 2019, and Family Jr. The third season premiered on Netflix on March 8, 2022, on Netflix. The fourth season premiered on Netflix on October 3, 2022.

== Plot ==
Chip and Potato takes place in the fictional town of Happyton, populated with anthropomorphic animals. The show is about Chip, a young little 4/5-year-old pug girl who faces big challenges and embarks on the early stages of her life. There to help and comfort Chip whenever she needs it is her best friend Potato, a living toy mouse who she snuggles in her pocket and must keep a secret.

== Characters ==
=== Main characters ===
- Chip (voiced by Abigail Oliver; Ava Talbot in the UK dub in season 1 and Megan Heavey in season 2 and onwards in the UK dub), is a friendly, curious, and kind-hearted 5/6-year-old pug girl. She is Nico and Potato's best friend.
- Potato (voiced by Andrea Libman) is Chip's best friend, who is a tiny mouse. Potato keeps herself a secret to everyone else; she appears as a toy when anyone else is around, except for Chip. She gives Chip security and confidence. In the Thanksgiving special, Potato willingly exposed herself although nobody was aware that she was Chip's toy.

=== Supporting characters ===
- Spud (voiced by Chance Hurstfield; Sam Day in season 1 in the UK dub and Ben Riley in season 2 and onwards in the UK dub) is Chip's older brother. His relationship with his sister is healthy and often gives advice to his sister when she's having trouble. Spud enjoys skateboarding.
- Little Momma (voiced by Briana Buckmaster; Kate Harbour in the UK dub) is Chip's mother. Formerly a receptionist, she is now a stay at home mother after having her third puglet, Totsy Tot.
- Little Poppa (voiced by Brian Dobson; Wayne Forester in the UK dub) is Chip's father. He is a police officer and does most of the house work like cooking whenever he's off-duty.
- Nico (voiced by Dominic Good) is a panda and Chip's best friend. Unlike most characters, he is shoeless.
- Totsy Tot (voice actress not credited) is Chip's baby sister. Despite getting off on the wrong foot, Chip adores her little sister and even gave her the name "Totsy Tot". Tot is one of the few characters Potato shows her true self around.
- Grandma Pug (voiced by Christina Jastrzembska) is Chip's grandmother. Grandma Pug does not live with Chip and her family and often makes visits, but she enjoys seeing her family whenever she has the chance. However, in the second season, she and her husband moved into Welcome Walk for their new business.
- Stomp and Stamp (voiced by Evan Byarushengo and Scotia Andersen) are a pair of twin elephants. They are Chip's friends and neighbors. Stomp and Stamp enjoy doing things together and are rarely seen apart.
- Amanda (voiced by Teryl Rothery) is Nico's mother. She raises both of her sons in Welcome Walk. Her husband Andy does not live with her and travels the world to help people decorate their homes as his job, but he and Amanda still love each other.
- Bodi (voice actor not credited) is Nico's baby brother. Bodi is one of the few who's aware of Potato's secret, Potato occasionally plays with him whenever they're alone.
- Mr. Diggerty (voiced by Alessandro Juliani) is the kindergarten teacher of Rainbow Forest School and teaches Chip's class. He is a fair and dedicated teacher and makes sure that his class is fun and fair for his students. In the Thanksgiving special, his first name is revealed to be "Desmond".
- Gigglish (voiced by Emma Jayne Maas) is a giraffe and is one of Chip's friends and neighbors. She's a sporty giraffe and enjoys any form of outdoor activity. She's seen doing cartwheels.
- Howie (voiced by Brenden Sunderland) is a hyena. He's a mischievous kindergartener at Rainbow Forest School. He likes blowing raspberries and always causes trouble. Despite this, he has a softer side and cares.
- Gordie Pug (voiced by Garry Chalk) is a pug and Grandma Pug's husband. They got married in the second season of the show, he moved into Welcome Walk with her. Gordie is also a magician.
- Glenda (voiced by Naomi Tan) is a dalmatian and Gordie's granddaughter.

== Production ==
Chip and Potato is co-produced by WildBrain Studios in Canada and Darrall Macqueen in the United Kingdom. The series' target demographic is children under seven years old. Maddy Darrall, the co-founder and co-MD at Darrall Macqueen, told C21 regarding the series that "series arcs in preschool animation are simply not done; we want to prove they should be."

A British dub by Adrenaline Studios was released on the same day the series debuted on Netflix.

== Episodes ==
=== Season 1 (2018–19) ===
No.	Title	Directed by	Written by	Storyboard by	Original release date	Netflix release date
1	"Morning Potato!"	Joel Dickie	Catherine Williams	Jason Horychun and David Wiebe	15 October 2018	17 May 2019
It's Chip's first day of kindergarten, and she wants to show that she is ready to get ready for school all by herself, just like her big brother Spud.
2	"Chip Starts Kindergarten"	Ridd Sorensen	Catherine Williams	Krista-Marie Porter	16 October 2018	17 May 2019
It's Chip's very first day at school. Chip is so excited, she wants to be first to see and do everything, but she'll have to learn to wait her turn.
3	"Chip Gets Lost"	Joel Dickie	Catherine Williams	David Wiebe	17 October 2018	17 May 2019
Chip volunteers to take the class attendance to the school office, but the school is a pretty big place for a little pug to navigate all on her own!
4	"Car Wash Chip"	Ridd Sorensen	Catherine Williams	Joel Dickie	18 October 2018	17 May 2019
Chip volunteers for her first ever chore: washing her neighbors' RV! The RV is huge compared to little Chip, but she's determined to finish the job.
5	"Chip Goes Rollerskating"	Joel Dickie	Simon Nicholson	Kent Webb	19 October 2018	17 May 2019
Mr. and Mrs. Dazzle give Chip a pair of rollerskates, and she wants to go rollerskating right away.
6	"Chip n Grandma Day"	Ridd Sorensen	Denise Cassar	Marta Demong	20 October 2018	17 May 2019
Chip gets to spend the day with her Grandma! But when traffic and line-ups delay their plans, Chip worries they won't have time for a special treat.
7	"Nico's First Day"	Joel Dickie	Catherine Williams	Karine Charlebois	21 October 2018	17 May 2019
Chip's new neighbour Nico is nervous about his first day at Rainbow Forest Elementary School, and Chip wants to be his First Day Buddy helper.
8	"Sporty Chip"	Ridd Sorensen	Dave Ingham	Marta Demong	22 October 2018	17 May 2019
Chip is excited for her first gym class, but she struggles to compete with the other Happy Hoppers because of her short puggy legs.
9	"Stomp and Stamp's Slide"	Joel Dickie	Miranda Larson	Sidne Marat	23 October 2018	17 May 2019
The Welcome Walkers want to play with Stomp and Stamp's new slide, but they have to wait for it to be built first.
10	"Show and Tell Chip"	Ridd Sorensen	Denise Cassar	Kaylea Chard	24 October 2018	17 May 2019
It's Show and Tell day for the Happy Hoppers! But when Chip's homemade mouse house gets squished, she has to think of something else to show.
11	"Chip and Deely Bear"	Joel Dickie	Dave Ingham	Krista-Marie Porter	25 October 2018	17 May 2019
After taking care of the class snuggly toy, Deely Bear, for the weekend, it's the night before school, and Chip can't find Deely Bear!
12	"Chip's Piano Lesson"	Ridd Sorensen	Denise Cassar	Gerry Fournier	3 December 2018	17 May 2019
It's Chip's first piano lesson with her teacher Corella Cockatoo! Chip wants to play a tune just like Momma, but first she has to learn just one note.
13	"A Playdate at Nico's"	Joel Dickie	Soulla Eriksen	Kent Webb	10 December 2018	17 May 2019
Chip goes to Nico's house all on her own for their first playdate, where Potato makes friends with baby Body and Chip learns to try new things.
14	"Roxy the Babysitter"	Ridd Sorenson	Simon Nicholson	Marta Demong	17 December 2018	17 May 2019
Chip is nervous about having a new babysitter, Roxy the rhino, she wants bedtime to be the same as it always is with Momma and Poppa.
15	"Chip's Class Show"	Joel Dickie	Catherine Williams	Karine Charlebois	7 January 2019	17 May 2019
The Happy Hoppers are performing a pirate show for their families. Chip is confident about her line, until she has to go on stage without Potato.
16	"Double Playdate Chip!"	Ridd Sorensen	Chris Parker	Jason Horychun	14 January 2019	17 May 2019
Spud's best friend Paco and Chip's best friend Nico come over for a double play date, but they have trouble finding an activity they all enjoy.
17	"Chip's First Sleepover"	Joel Dickie	Denise Cassar	Sidne Marat	21 January 2019	17 May 2019
Chip goes to Nico's house for her first sleepover. But bedtime is a lot different at the Panda house, and Chip isn't sure she wants to stay overnight.
18	"Doctor Chip"	Ridd Sorensen	Helen Farrall	Kaylea Chard	28 January 2019	17 May 2019
When Potato catches a cold during a family fun day, Chip tries to help her get better.
19	"Chip's Swimming Lesson"	Joel Dickie	Dave Ingham	David Wiebe	4 February 2019	17 May 2019
It's time for Chip's first swimming lesson, along with the rest of the Happy Hoppers! But jumping into the pool can be pretty scary for a little pug.
20	"Spud's Homework"	Ridd Sorensen	Emma Nisbet	Simon Piniel	11 February 2019	17 May 2019
Chip wants to help Spud with his homework assignment even though he asked her not to. When she tries to help out anyway, she accidentally ruins it.
21	"Police Pug Chip"	Joel Dickie	Chris Parker	David Wiebe	4 March 2019	29 November 2019
Chip joins her Poppa for Bring Your Child to Work Day, but when Potato goes missing at the Happyton Police Station, she has an emergency on her hands.
22	"Pumpkin Picking Chip"	Ridd Sorensen	Lizzie Ennever	Gerry Fournier	11 March 2019	29 November 2019
During the annual pumpkin picking competition, Chip and Potato find the biggest pumpkin ever, but they need to get it home to win the competition.
23	"Chip's School Trip"	Joel Dickie	Dave Ingham	Steve Daye	18 March 2019	29 November 2019
The Happy Hoppers are going on their first school trip to the museum, but nothing goes according to plan for Chip.
24	"Big Sister Chip"	Ridd Sorensen	Helen Farrall	Luke Gustafson	25 March 2019	29 November 2019
The new Pug baby is about to be born. While she waits for news from Momma and Poppa, Chip has a sleepover with the Pandas next door.
25	"Chip's Baby Sister"	Joel Dickie	Catherine Williams	Karine Charlebois	1 April 2019	29 November 2019
Chip's new baby sister has come home, and Chip wants to hold her for the first time. But the baby puglet cries every time Chip tries.
26	"After School Chip"	Ridd Sorensen	Catherine Williams	Jason Horychun	8 April 2019	29 November 2019
Chip is going to the Rainbow Forest After School Club for the first time.
27	"Grandma Pug's Birthday"	Joel Dickie	Gillian Corderoy	Sidne Marat	15 April 2019	29 November 2019
Chip has planned the best birthday party ever for Grandma Pug, but when Grandma brings an unexpected friend to the party, nothing goes as planned.
28	"Puggy House Guest"	Ridd Sorensen	Mark Robertson	Kaylea Chard	22 April 2019	29 November 2019
Momma's friend Fernanda introduces the family to foosball. Chip struggles to win, even with expert advice from Fernanda.
29	"Puggy Butterfly"	Joel Dickie	Simon Nicholson	David Wiebe	29 April 2019	29 November 2019
Chip doesn't feel well at school, but she doesn't want to miss the class butterfly emerging from is chrysalis, so she tries to hide how she feels.
30	"Itchy Chip"	Ridd Sorensen	Denise Cassar	Katherine De Vries	6 May 2019	29 November 2019
Chip has the itchy puggy spots, but she isn't allowed to scratch. She'll need to get creative to stay busy and forget about her itchy spots.
31	"Back to School Chip"	Joel Dickie	Dave Ingham	Krista-Marie Porter	13 May 2019	29 November 2019
Chip's Puggy Spots are healing so she returns to school, but it seems like everything changed while she was away.
32	"Chip's Big Bike Ride"	Ridd Sorensen	Alexandra Owen	Gerry Fournier & Karine Charlebois	20 May 2019	29 November 2019
Chip wants to go on a bike ride to Happyton Park with Momma and baby Tot. But first she'll have to learn to ride Spud's old big pug bike!
33	"Bye Bye Dazzles"	Joel Dickie	Chris Parker	Steve Daye	27 May 2019	29 November 2019
Chip's neighbors, the Dazzles, are moving away. She's sad to see her beloved neighbors leave, and wants them to know how much she'll miss them!
34	"Puggy Parent-Teacher Day"	Ridd Sorensen	Chris Parker	Luke Gustafson	3 June 2019	29 November 2019
It's Parent-Teacher Day, and Chip has been a perfect student all year. But then she gets in trouble for talking too much, ruining her perfect record!
35	"Chip's First Piano Exam"	Joel Dickie	Denise Cassar	Jason Horychun	10 June 2019	29 November 2019
It's time for Chip to take her first piano exam. But every time Chip thinks about the exam, she gets scared and her paws go wobbly.
36	"Chip's Homework Project"	Ridd Sorensen	Catherine Williams	Jason Horychun	17 June 2019	29 November 2019
Chip is having trouble with a homework project; she can't fit all her family and friends in one drawing.
37	"Hospital Trip Chip"	Joel Dickie	Catherine Williams	Sidne Marat	24 June 2019	29 November 2019
Chip's friend Nico must stay overnight at the hospital with a broken arm and a bump on his head. It's up to Chip and Potato to help him feel better!
38	"Chip Without Potato"	Ridd Sorensen	Catherine Williams	Kaylea Chard	1 July 2019	29 November 2019
It's Chip's first time without Potato. Chip misses having her friend to talk to, and she worries she won't be able to sleep without a Potato snuggle.
39	"Chip's Birthday"	Joel Dickie	Catherine Williams	David Wiebe	8 July 2019	29 November 2019
It's Chip's fifth birthday but she is worried her most special friends Nico and Potato won't be home in time for her birthday party.
40	"Snow School Chip"	Ridd Sorensen	Catherine Williams	Katherine De Vries	15 July 2019	29 November 2019
During a snowy school day, Chip and Nico share the job of looking after Potato.

=== Season 2 (2021) ===
No.	Title	Directed by	Written by	Storyboard by	Original release date	Netflix release date
1	"Fairground Chip"	Matt Ferguson	Catherine Williams	Kaylea Chard	18 September 2021	8 March 2022
Chip and her friends spend the last day of their school vacation at the Happyton Fair.
2	"Chip, Meet Mrs. Whale"	Joel Dickie	Sam Barlow	Vincent K. Smith & Jocelan Thiessen	18 September 2021	8 March 2022
School's a lot different when a substitute steps in for Mr. Diggerty.
3	"Chip and Glenda"	Matt Ferguson	Emma Boucher	Erika Schnellert & Selena Marchetti	19 September 2021	8 March 2022
Chip is sad when it seems like Gordie's granddaughter is stealing the spotlight.
4	"Chip, the Picnic Entertainer"	Joel Dickie	Kate Scott	Pat Waind	19 September 2021	8 March 2022
Chip and Nico work together to make instruments for a school project.
5	"Chip's Haircut"	Matt Ferguson	Mark Robertson	Harinam Virdee	25 September 2021	8 March 2022
Chip's going to the groomer for the first time — but is she ready for a new style?
6	"Chip's Sleepaway T-shirt"	Joel Dickie	Dave Ingham	Airin Budiman	25 September 2021	8 March 2022
Chip struggles to make good choices while spending time with Howie.
7	"Tot's New Bed"	Matt Ferguson	Emma Hogan	Flora Huang	26 September 2021	8 March 2022
Tot's growing up... but does that mean Chip has to give up her bed?
8	"Chip's Cake Bake"	Joel Dickie	Alexandra Owen	Colleen Lofstrom	26 September 2021	8 March 2022
Chip runs into trouble when she tries to make a cake for Tot's first birthday.
9	"Kevin Comes to Stay"	Matt Ferguson	Chris Parker	Kaylea Chard	2 October 2021	8 March 2022
Poppa's police station cat is staying for the weekend and needs extra-special care.
10	"Tot's First Birthday"	Joel Dickie	Denise Cassar	Chris Johnston	2 October 2021	8 March 2022
It's time for Tot's birthday party — and Grandma has a big surprise!
11	"Bridespup Chip"	Matt Ferguson	Denise Cassar	Erika Schnellert	3 October 2021	3 October 2022
Chip gets to be part of Grandma's wedding and helps choose what she'll wear to the event.
12	"Chip and Nico's Fun Day"	Joel Dickie	Chris Parker	Pat Waind	3 October 2021	3 October 2022
It's Fun Day at school — but there are still rules to follow.
13	"Chip is Sorry"	Matt Ferguson	Catherine Williams	Sujan Chowdhury & Jocelan Thiessen	9 October 2021	3 October 2022
After accidentally getting Nico in trouble, Chip worries he doesn't want to be her best friend anymore.
14	"Grandma and Gordie's Taqueria"	Joel Dickie	Emma Hogan	Airin Budiman	9 October 2021	3 October 2022
Grandma and Gordie open a taco restaurant.
15	"Flingos' Show"	Matt Ferguson	Chris Parker	Flora Huang	16 October 2021	3 October 2022
Chip offers to take photos at the Flingos' synchronized swimming show, but it's harder than it looks!
16	"Boo-bam's School Visit"	Joel Dickie	Mark Robertson	Colleen Lofstrom	16 October 2021	3 October 2022
Nico brings his favorite stuffed animal to school.
17	"Tot and Potato"	Matt Ferguson	Jen Upton	Vincent K. Smith & Selena Marchetti	17 October 2021	3 October 2022
Potato stays home to help a teething Tot feel better, but it's hard for Chip to be at school without her.
18	"Howie Has Heart"	Joel Dickie	Dave Ingham	Renee Howerton	17 October 2021	3 October 2022
Chip discovers Howie has a softer side.
19	"Wedding Rehearsal Chip"	Matt Ferguson	Catherine Williams	Erika Schnellert	23 October 2021	3 October 2022
Chip practices where to stand — and how to be helpful — at Grandma's wedding.
20	"Grandma and Gordie's Big Puggy Wedding"	Joel Dickie	Catherine Williams	Pat Waind	23 October 2021	3 October 2022
But when the big day comes, she's so excited that it's hard to stay calm.
21–22	"Flying Chip"	Matt Ferguson	Catherine Williams	Renee Howerton & Carlo Marcelo	24 October 2021	8 March 2022
The Pug family's going on vacation — and Chip's getting on her very first airplane! Good thing she remembered to bring the most important thing: Potato!
23–24	"Chip's Holiday"	Matt Ferguson & Joel Dickie	Catherine Williams	Chris Johnston & Kaylea Chard	24 October 2021	27 June 2022
When falling coconuts keep everyone awake all night on vacation, Chip and Potato come up with a plan to help the family get a puggy good night's sleep!
25–26	"Chip's Thanksgiving"	Joel Dickie	Catherine Williams	Antonius Elkommos, Jocelan Thiessen, Ziqing Sophia Li, & Flora Huang	10 October 2021	3 October 2022
The Pug and Panda families work together to feed the whole neighborhood for Thanksgiving — and everyone's welcome. The more the puggier!

== Broadcast ==
Chip and Potato first premiered on Family Jr on October 15, 2018. The series was released to Netflix worldwide as a "Netflix original" on May 17, 2019.
