= My Almost Famous Family =

British children's television series

- Written by: Joe Williams; Emma Reeves; Andrew Viner; Gerard Foster; Gail Sky King; Andy Watts; Patricia Elcock; Paul McKenzie; Paul Gerstenberger
- Directed by: Beryl Richards; Griff Rowland; Jonathan Gershfield
- Starring: Rakie Ayola; Andrew Clover; Angus Harrison; Matthew Jacobs Morgan; Naomi Battrick; Dominique Moore; Rachel Brady; Alice Henley; Alan Ford; Emily Joyce
- Composers: Richie Webb; Tom Nichols; Steve Young; Tim Baxter
- Country of origin: United Kingdom
- No. of seasons: 1
- No. of episodes: 11

Production
- Executive producer: Steven Andrew
- Producer: Paul McKenzie
- Cinematography: Ian Liggett
- Running time: 28 minutes

Original release
- Network: CBBC, BBC Two
- Release: 12 September – 21 November 2009

My Almost Famous Family is a British children's television series produced by the BBC and originally aired between 12 September and 21 November 2009 on CBBC on BBC Two. The show was not recommissioned for a second series.

== Premise ==
The 11-part series was about a blended family of five siblings and their parents who performed together as the house band, 'We're in Perfect Harmony', of a fictional chat show. It was written by a team of writers that included Gail Renard and Emma Reeves.

== Production ==
Composer and performer Richie Webb, whose credits include the BBC Radio 4 series 15 Minute Musical, was the show's musical director.

The shows theme tune 'Almost Famous' was written by Richard Webb, Steve Young and Tom Nichols. Incidental music was written and recorded by Tim Baxter.

=== In other media ===
On 17 April 2010, the BBC launched the My Almost Famous Family interactive website on the CBBC website, which consisted of 16 interactive games, music videos, and songs from the show.

== Cast ==
- Rakie Ayola as Shalondra Swann, the family's matriarch (percussion and backing vocals)
- Andrew Clover as Gary Swann, the family's patriarch (keyboard)
- Angus Harrison as Hadley Terence Swann, Gary's son (lead guitar)
- Naomi Battrick as Toyah Swann, Gary's daughter (cello and bass guitar)
- Dominique Moore as Aretha Swann, Shalondra's daughter (lead vocals)
- Matthew Jacobs Morgan as Isaac Swann, Shalondra's son (drums)
- Rachel Brady as Martha Swann, Gary and Shalondra's daughter, who is deaf and uses sign language to communicate
- Alan Ford as Terry Swann, Gary's father and the kids' grandfather
- Alice Henley as Annabelle Iceton, host of The Totally Annabelle Show, on which the family play
- Emily Joyce as Jill Iceton, Annabelle's mother and owner of the studio
- Nick Rapson as Zac Macdonald

== Episodes ==
No.	Title	Directed by	Written by	Original release date
1	"We've Only Just Begun"	Beryl Richards	Andrew Viner	12 September 2009
The Swann family band, We're in Perfect Harmony, become the house band on The Totally Annabelle Show. Annabelle plans on usurping lead-singer Aretha and duetting with Hadley. Toyah is forced to choose between the band's show and a school interview on the same day.
2	"The Girl Is Mine"	Griff Rowland	Joe Williams	19 September 2009
Gary and Shalondra go camping, leaving the children with Gary's father Terry. Toyah practises for her grade eight cello exam, while Terry has the band perform his 1970s hit single.
3	"The Sound of Silence"	Beryl Richards	Gerard Foster	26 September 2009
Isaac kidnaps Pixie, Annabelle's pet pig. Aretha loses her hearing and is helped by Toyah and Martha to overcome the problem before a record executive arrives to hear her sing, so Toyah sings and she is fantastic.
4	"Piece of Me"	Griff Rowland	Emma Reeves	3 October 2009
Gary struggles to fulfill his fatherly commitments to both Hadley and Isaac, so Shalondra devises a creative solution. Toyah lets her celebrity status go to her head.
5	"Beat Surrender"	Jonathan Gershfield	Andrew Viner	10 October 2009
Gary and Shalondra set the children a maths test, announcing that anyone who fails must leave the band. Isaac is distracted from revising by Terry, jeopardising his future in the band.He is not allowed to play with the band until he gets a better grade in the maths test.
6	"You Can't Touch This"	Beryl Richards	Gail Sky King	17 October 2009
Gary and Shalondra are locked in the recording studio while spying on the children. Aretha breaks Toyah's cello bow and tries to hide the truth from her.
7	"Matters of the Harp (Bittersweet Symphony)"	Griff Rowland	Gail Sky King & Andy Watts	24 October 2009
Hadley lies to impress a girl, while Aretha receives a lucrative offer to become the face and voice of the Yappy Nappy brand. Hadley has to decide whether to play in the band or with the girl of his life
8	"Take a Chance on Me"	Jonathan Gershfield	Paul Gerstenberger (story) & Paul McKenzie	31 October 2009
Hadley wonders why Isaac is more popular than him, while Toyah and Aretha are in direct competition to write a song for R&B star Monelle.
9	"Born to Be Wild"	Jonathan Gershfield	Patricia Elcock	7 November 2009
Hadley is mugged by a group of girls and considers leaving the band. Aretha and Toyah conspire to beat Annabelle in the Teen-Style Queen awards.
10	"Can't Get You Out of My Head"	Beryl Richards	Emma Reeves	14 November 2009
When Toyah falls for TV star Zac MacDonald, Aretha gives her a makeover. Hadley and Isaac become addicted to the computer game Supalife. Shalondra meets up with her sisters.
11	"Christmas Time"	Jonathan Gershfield	Gail Sky King	21 November 2009
The Totally Annabelle Christmas special broadcasts from the Swanns' living room. Toyah's OCD flares up, Hadley wants to sing a solo, and Shalondra tries to find her presents.
