= Phil Nice =

British actor (born 1954)

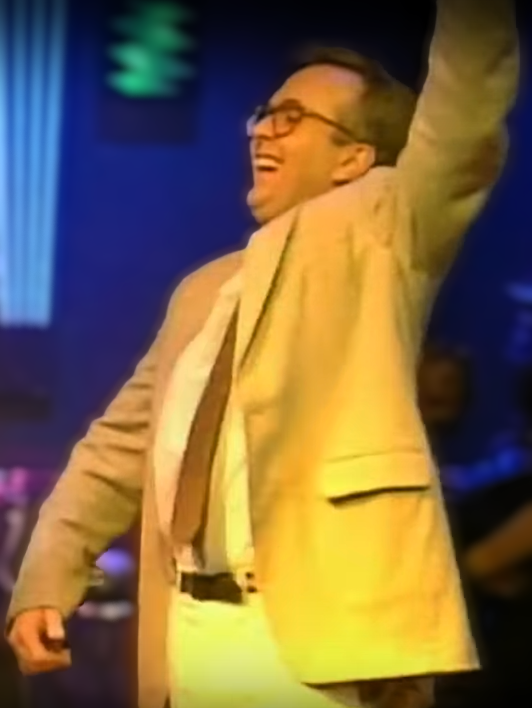
- Nice in "Mr. Bean Goes to Town" (1991)
- Born: Phillip Nice; 6 April 1954 (age 72); Vange, Essex, England
- Occupation: Actor

Phillip Nice (born 6 April 1954) is a British actor who has been active in television and films since 1984. He was born in Vange, Essex.

Nice has appeared in a number of television series, including Who Dares Wins, South of the Border, Inspector Morse, Mr. Bean, Goodnight Sweetheart, The Bill, EastEnders, Heartbeat, The Inbetweeners (as a driving instructor), Coming of Age, Moving Wallpaper, Love Soup, Torchwood: Miracle Day, My Family, Hebburn and Citizen Khan (as the friendly neighbour Keith) and Waffle The Wonder Dog as (Mr Willow). He also appeared in Morrisons adverts in 2011.

Nice has appeared in the films Ident, Danny the Champion of the World, Magicians and A Kind of Hush.

In December, 1985, Nice, along with temporary comedy partner Arthur Smith, made a short series of parody documentaries for Channel 4, Arthur and Phil Go Off.

In 2014, Nice played an astronaut killed by giant spiders in "Kill the Moon", the seventh episode of the eighth series of the science-fiction television show Doctor Who.

In January 2015, Nice appeared in series two of Broadchurch as Andrew Darlington, the manager of the care home looking after Jocelyn Knight's elderly mother.

== Filmography ==
=== Film ===
Film
Year	Title	Role	Notes
1990	Ident	Paul Hernandez,Carla's Wife	Short film Voice
1999	A Kind of Hush	Price,Father	
2011	Tortoise	Frank	Short film

=== Television ===
Television
Year	Title	Role	Notes
1984	Alas Smith and Jones	Various	2 episodes
1984	The Kit Curran Radio Show	Wally	Series 1, episode 4: "P Is for Positive"
1984	Who Dares Wins	Various	2 episodes
1985	South of the Border	Warwick	7 episodes
1986	Spitting Image	Roy Jenkins / John Craven / Max Bygraves	Voice; Episode #3.4
1986	Five Alive	Various	
1987	Inspector Morse	Nicholas Quinn	Series 1, episode 2: "The Silent World of Nicholas Quinn"
1987	Hardwicke House	Security Man	Episode 2: "The First Day of Term"
1987	Hello Mum		Episode 5
1987	Ffizz	Gerry	Series 1, episode 6: "With Friends Like These"
1988-1990	Chelmsford 123	Posty / Triconus	2 episodes
1989	Danny, the Champion of the World	Postman	TV movie
1989	Mornin' Sarge	Horace	Episode 1: "Perverts"
1990-1991	Davro		13 episodes
1990-1999	The Bill	Curator / Walker / Nigel Cobb	3 episodes
1991	Mr. Bean	Disco Dancer	Episode 4: "Mr. Bean Goes to Town"
1991	Drop the Dead Donkey	Man in Bed	Series 2, episode 11: "George's Daughter"
1992	Me, You and Him	Ralph	Episode 4: "On the Town"
1992	TV Squash	Panelist	6 episodes
1992-1993	KYTV	Doctor	2 episodes
1994	The All New Alexei Sayle Show	Various	Episode 4
1995	Health and Efficiency	Roy Wisdom	Series 2, episode 6: "Finders Keepers"
1995	Nelson's Column	Patrick	Series 2, episode 4: "Surprise!"
1995	The Thin Blue Line	Father	Series 1, episode 7: "Yuletide Spirit"
1996	Goodnight Sweetheart	George Formby	Series 3, episode 6: "Turned Out Nice Again"
1996	Jack and Jeremy's Real Lives	Mr. Gordon	Episode 3: "Paranormal Researchers"
1997	Cows		TV movie
1998	How Do You Want Me?	Policeman	2 episodes
1998	PB Bear and Friends		Voice; 2 episodes
1999	Days Like These	Paul Foreman	Episode 7: "Grandma's Dead"
1999	People Like Us		Series 1, episode 4: "The Solicitor"
1999	Put Out More Fags	Headteacher	TV movie
2000	Dirty Tricks	Businessman	TV movie
2000-2005	EastEnders	Mr. Smith / Ron	2 episodes
2000-2022	Doctors	Geoffrey Parsons / Giles Bloom / Norman Green / Nick Kelly	4 episodes
2001	A Lump in My Throat	Poker-Playing Friend	
2002	Heartbeat	Gordon Drew	Series 11, episode 14: "From Ancient Grudge"
2002	My Hero		Series 3, episode 7: "Little Green Man"
2002-2008	My Family	Mr. Baker / Shopper	2 episodes
2004	Mile High	Mr. Colins	Episode #2.4
2004	Fallen	Reeves	TV movie
2004	The Basil Brush Show	Dustman #1	Series 3, episode 1: "Frocks Rocks"
2005	Footprints in the Snow	Stall Holder	TV movie
2005	The Golden Hour	Bus Driver	Miniseries; Episode 3
2005	The Brief	Clerk of the Court	Series 2, episode 3: "Forever on the Mind"
2005	Broken News	Russ – Look Out East	6 episodes
2006	Vital Signs	Mr. Simms	Episode 3
2006	Fear of Fanny	Technician	TV movie
2007	Bonkers	Debbie's Dad	2 episodes
2007	Secret Life	Residential Care Worker	TV movie
2008	Love Soup	Ted	Series 2, episode 1: "Smoke and Shadows"
2008	Moving Wallpaper	Dave the Props Man	Series 1, episode 11: "Echo Beach Part XI"
2008	HolbyBlue	James Pretorious	Episode #2.2
2008	The Inbetweeners	Driving Instructor	Series 1, episode 3: "Thorpe Park"
2008	Coming of Age	Chloe's Dad / Daddy Bear	2 episodes
2010	I Shouldn't Be Alive	Darryl Johnson	Series 3, episode 4: "Crushed and Alone"
2010	Holby City	Gary Pennington	Series 12, episode 47: "Transgressions"
2011	Torchwood	Male Hiker	Series 4, episode 1: "The New World"
2011	Outnumbered	Mr. Henderson	Series 4, episode 3: "The Labrador"
2012	Comedy Showcase	The Priest	Series 3, episode 6: "The Function Room"
2012	Hunderby	Ben	2 episodes
2012	Spy	Roy	Series 2, episode 3: "Codename: Lie Hard"
2012-2013	Hebburn	Ben	4 episodes
2012-2016	Citizen Khan	Keith	11 episodes
2013	Way to Go	George Hooper	Episode 1: "The Beginning of the End"
2013	Love and Marriage	Vicar	Episode 1: "Huge Weekend for the Paradise Family"
2013	Quick Cuts	Robert	Episode 3
2014	Doctor Who	Henry	Series 8, episode 7: "Kill the Moon"
2014	Broadchurch	Andrew Darlington	Episode #2.3
2014	Ballot Monkeys	Activist	Episode 1
2016	Houdini & Doyle	Reverend Gilby	Episode 2: "A Dish of Adharma"
2018	Waffle the Wonder Dog	Mr. Willow	3 episodes
2019	Hold the Sunset	Mr. Black	Series 2, episode 1: "The Sale"
2022	Kate & Koji	Twitcher 2	Series 2, episode 3: "Memories"
2022	DI Ray	Customer	Episode 1: "Part One"

=== Video games ===
Video games
Year	Title	Role	Notes
Ceville		Voice	

=== Podcasts ===
Podcast
Year	Title	Role	Notes
2022	Chelmsford 123: The Revival	Emperor	Episode 1: "Arriverderci Roma"
