= Topsy and Tim =

Children's media series

Topsy and Tim is a series of children's books written by Jean Adamson and Gareth Adamson about twins and their adventures with their friends. They were first published by Blackie in 1960; Topsy and Tim were relaunched in new editions in 1990, 2003 and 2009. In 2020, Topsy and Tim On the Farm was reprinted to celebrate 60 years since the first publication.

Since 1960, more than 130 Topsy and Tim titles have been published with sales of more than 21 million. Since first broadcasting on CBeebies in 2013, the live-action production of Topsy and Tim has received over 250 million views online.

== Origin ==
In an interview with The Guardian, Jean Adamson said that she and her future husband had been trained as book illustrators at Goldsmiths College. They decided to get married and leave their former jobs in order to write and illustrate their own children's books. Their approach was shaped by a visit to a children's bookshop in Newcastle where they realised that there were few books depicting actual contemporary children. She explained that the books were also influenced by the post-war mood:

At that time, not so terribly long after the end of the war, England was just waking up, bright colours were coming in, there was a lovely optimistic feeling in the air. So I said "Why don't we do books with real live little children in, with the little adventures and so on that they have in the house?"

== Television series ==
The books have been adapted for television twice; first, in collaboration with Video Collection International in 1991, and second, in collaboration with Darrall Macqueen Ltd for the 2013 live-action production, which first aired on CBeebies and is now available on DVD and online.

=== Bevanfield Films ===
In 1991, an animated series was produced by Bevanfield Films for Video Collection International, consisting of 60 five-minute episodes narrated by Roger Blake. The series was broadcast on ITV.

=== CBeebies ===
In 2013, a new live-action series was made for CBeebies, consisting of three series and 71 episodes. Further details can be seen here: List of Topsy and Tim episodes. No further episodes have been planned as of 2024. The series was produced by Darrall Macqueen Ltd and distributed globally by WildBrain. Series 1 and 2 were filmed from March to October 2013, the Christmas Special was filmed in December 2013 and Series 3 was filmed from June to August 2015.

=== Characters ===
Cast list of Topsy and Tim
Actor	Character			
Actor	Character	1	2	3
Jocelyn MacNab	Topsy O’Dell	Main	Main	Main
Joshua Lester	Tim O’Dell	Main	Main	Main
Anna Acton	Joy O’Dell	Main	Main	Main
Chris Hannon	Brian O’Dell	Main	Main	Main
Suzy Aitchison	Jean O’Dell	Main	Main	Main
Natahlia Colbourne	Kerry	Recurring	Recurring	Recurring
Tom Hibberd	Tony Welch	Recurring	Recurring	Recurring
Nicole Davis	Dominique	Recurring	Recurring	Recurring
Iain Campbell	Carson	Recurring	Recurring	Recurring
Emily Butterfield	Elaine Welch	Recurring	Recurring	Guest
Barry McCarthy	Mr. Fishwick	Recurring	—N/a	—N/a
Kayleigh Burke	Vinda	Recurring	Recurring	Recurring
Natalya Hibberd	Josie Miller	—N/a	Recurring	Recurring
Jon Rummey	Mr. Rosen	Recurring	Recurring	Recurring
Tim Hibberd	Mr. Fen	—N/a	Recurring	Guest
Joshua Levin	Stephen "Stevie" Dunton	—N/a	Recurring	Recurring
Kemaal Deen-Ellis	Rai	Recurring	Guest	—N/a
Tom Price	Paul Welch	—N/a	Recurring	Recurring
Bobby Smalldridge	Andy Anderson	—N/a	Recurring	Recurring
Emma Kershaw	Dr. Walton	—N/a	—N/a	Recurring
India Brown	Molly	—N/a	—N/a	Recurring
Eva Alexander	Miss Terry	—N/a	Guest	—N/a
June Whitfield	Mrs Higley-Pigley	—N/a	Guest	—N/a
James Wooldridge	Mr. Morris	—N/a	—N/a	Recurring
Glen Davies	DIY Derek	Recurring	Guest	Recurring
Jake Unsworth	Kevin	—N/a	Guest	—N/a

== Topsy and Tim Books ==
=== First Generation: 1960–1987 ===
The first generation of Topsy and Tim books were characterised by Jean Adamson's rich gouache illustrations and believable stories filled with fun anecdotes by Gareth Adamson. They were illustrated primarily by Jean Adamson, with some titles illustrated by Gareth Adamson and Gabrielle Adamson.

#	Date	Title	ISBN
1	1960	Monday Book	n/a
2	1960	Tuesday Book	n/a
3	1961	Wednesday Book	n/a
4	1961	Thursday Book	n/a
5	1961	Friday Book	n/a
6	1961	Saturday Book	n/a
7	1962	Sunday Book	n/a
8	1962	Foggy Day	978-0-216-88664-3
9	1963	Football Match	n/a
10	1964	Snowy Day	978-0-216-89235-4
11	1965	At the Seaside	978-0-216-88670-4
12	1968	At School	978-0-216-89014-5
13	1968	At the Zoo	978-0-216-89015-2
14	1970	Bonfire Night	978-0-216-88667-4
15	1970	Go Fishing	978-0-216-91398-1
16	1970	On the Farm	978-0-216-88674-2
17	1970	Paddling Pool	978-0-216-88675-9
18	1970	The Adventures of Topsy and Tim	978-0-216-88704-6
19	1971	Birthday Party	978-0-216-88719-0
20	1971	Go to Hospital	978-0-216-88720-6
21	1971	Happy Days with Topsy and Tim	978-0-216-89235-4
22	1971	Surprises for Topsy and Tim	978-0-216-89233-0
23	1972	Go Pony-Trekking	978-0-216-89528-7
24	1972	Safety First with Topsy and Tim	978-0-216-91313-4
25	1972	Take No Risks	978-0-216-90458-3
26	1973	Go Sailing	978-0-216-89653-6
27	1973	Learn to Swim	978-0-216-89654-3
28	1973	Go Hill-Walking	978-0-216-89652-9
29	1974	Cross the Channel	978-0-216-89808-0
30	1974	Go to Holland	978-0-216-89734-2
31	1974	In Belgium	978-0-216-89805-9
32	1975	New Brother	978-0-216-90105-6
33	1975	Visit the Dentist	978-0-216-89894-3
34	1975	Visit the Doctors	978-0-216-89983-4
35	1976	At the Wedding	978-0-216-90281-7
36	1976	New School	978-0-216-90287-9
37	1976	Pet Show	978-0-216-90284-8
38	1976	Visit the Tower of London	978-0-216-90282-4
39	1977	At the Circus	978-0-216-90403-3
40	1977	Go Camping	978-0-216-90405-7
41	1977	Go Shopping	978-0-216-90409-5
42	1977	Monday Book (version 2)	978-0-216-90304-3
43	1977	Tuesday Book (version 2)	978-0-216-90306-7
44	1977	Wednesday Book (version 2)	978-0-216-90308-1
45	1977	Thursday Book (version 2)	978-0-216-90310-4
46	1977	Friday Book (version 2)	978-0-216-90312-8
47	1977	Saturday Book (version 2)	978-0-216-89364-1
48	1977	Sunday Book (version 2)	978-0-216-90302-9
49	1977	Sports Day	978-0-216-90407-1
50	1977	Through The Year	978-0-216-90300-5
51	1978	At the Fairground	978-0-216-90529-0
52	1978	At the Library	978-0-216-90523-8
53	1978	At the Vet	978-0-216-90524-5
54	1978	Choose a Puppy	978-0-216-90527-6
55	1978	Meet the Monsters	978-0-216-90570-2
56	1978	Picnic	978-0-216-90544-3
57	1978	School Outing	978-0-216-90542-9
58	1978	Train Journey	978-0-216-90568-9
59	1979	At the Fire Station	978-0-216-90808-6
60	1979	At the Jumble Sale	978-0-216-90807-9
61	1979	At the Pantomime	978-0-216-90810-9
62	1979	Caravan Holiday	978-0-216-90812-3
63	1979	Go in an Aeroplane	978-0-216-90810-9
64	1979	Have a Barbecue	978-0-216-90692-1
65	1979	Move House	978-0-216-90688-4
66	1979	At the Hairdresser	978-0-216-90691-4
67	1980	Can Print in Colour	978-0-216-90991-5
68	1980	Can Sing and Play	978-0-216-90988-5
69	1980	Can Garden	978-0-216-90984-7
70	1981	Can Cook	978-0-216-90986-1
71	1981	Learn to Swim (version 2)	978-0-216-91143-7
72	1981	Can Look After Pets	978-0-216-91123-9
73	1982	ABC	978-0-216-91269-4
74	1982	Can Make Music	978-0-216-91174-1
75	1982	Counting Book	978-0-216-91267-0
76	1982	Go Safely	978-0-216-91314-1
77	1982	Have Their Eyes Tested	978-0-216-91154-3
78	1982	Help the Dustmen	978-0-216-91260-1
79	1982	New Playground	978-0-216-91258-8
80	1982	School Play	978-0-216-91263-2
81	1982	Can Play Party Games	978-0-216-91124-6
82	1983	Chocolate Cook Book	978-0-216-91362-2
83	1983	In the Kitchen	978-0-216-91520-6
84	1983	Pets	978-0-216-91514-5
85	1983	Big Fun Book	978-0-216-91272-4
86	1983	Games Book	
87	1983	Go On Holiday	978-0-216-91400-1
88	1983	Go riding	978-0-216-91402-5
89	1983	Music Book	978-0-216-91515-2
90	1984	At the Football Match (version 2)	978-0-216-91370-7
91	1984	Playing Rhymes	978-0-216-91543-5
92	1984	Tell the Time	978-0-216-91581-7
93	1984	Visit the Police Station	978-0-216-91368-4
94	1984	Word Book	978-0-216-91582-4
95	1985	At the Bank	978-0-216-91810-8
96	1985	Farm Day (Shape Book)	978-0-216-91721-7
97	1985	Motorway Games	978-0-216-91706-4
98	1985	On the Move (Shape Book)	978-0-216-91723-1
99	1985	Ride Their Bikes	978-0-216-91815-3
100	1985	And the Babysitter	978-0-216-91704-0
101	1985	At the Supermarket	978-0-216-91367-7
102	1985	In the Gym	978-0-216-91813-9
103	1986	At the Post Office	978-0-216-91940-2
104	1986	At the Safari Park	978-0-216-91934-1
105	1986	Coach Journey	978-0-216-91936-5
106	1986	Learn to Horse Ride	978-0-216-91938-9
107	1986	New Shoes	978-0-216-91365-3
108	1986	Monday Book (version 3)	978-0-216-92040-8
109	1986	Tuesday Book (version 3)	978-0-216-92042-2
110	1986	Wednesday Book (version 3)	978-0-216-92044-6
111	1986	Thursday Book (version 3)	978-0-216-88660-5
112	1986	Friday Book (version 3)	978-0-216-92049-1
113	1986	Saturday Book (version 3)	978-0-216-92050-7
114	1986	Sunday Book (version 3)	978-0-216-92038-5
115	1986	Can Help Birds	978-0-216-91176-5
116	1987	At the Biscuit Factory	978-0-216-92311-9
117	1987	At the Farmyard	978-0-216-92317-1
118	1987	At the TV Studio	978-0-216-92313-3
119	1987	Stay with a Friend	978-0-216-92316-4
120	-	Seven Days with Topsy and Tim - Gift Pack	-
121	-	Topsy and Tim's Animal Friends - Gift Pack	-
122	-	Going Places with Topsy and Tim - Gift Pack	978-0-216-91170-3

=== Second Generation: 1990–2007 ===
The second generation of Topsy and Tim books, with illustrations drafted by Jean Adamson and coloured by professional artists.

#	Date	Title	ISBN-13
1	1990	At the Supermarket (Version 2)	978-0-216-92857-2
2	1992	At the Wedding (Version 2)	978-0-216-92849-7
3	1992	Go in an Aeroplane (Version 2)	978-0-216-92466-6
4	1992	Go on a Train (Version 2)	978-0-216-92855-8
5	1992	Go to School	978-0-216-92468-0
6	1992	Have Horse Riding Lessons	978-0-216-92600-4
7	1992	Meet the Babysitter	978-0-216-92593-9
8	1992	Ride Their Bikes (Version 2)	978-0-216-93134-3
9	1992	Small Pets (Version 2)	978-0-216-92843-5
10	1992	Stay with a Friend (Version 2)	978-0-216-93132-9
11	1993	At Granny and Grandpa's	978-0-216-94054-3
12	1993	Go Camping (Version 2)	978-0-216-94043-7
13	1993	At the School Fair	978-0-216-94052-9
14	1995	At the Gym Club	978-0-216-94169-4
15	1995	First French Words - Premiers Mots Anglais	978-0-216-94092-5
16	1995	Meet the Dinosaurs (Version 2)	978-0-216-94166-3
17	1996	And the Bully	978-0-14-055954-5
18	1996	and The New Baby	978-0-14-055915-6
19	1996	And the New Puppy (Version 2)	978-0-14-055937-8
20	1996	Go to the Park	978-0-14-055927-9
21	1996	Meet the Ambulance Crew	978-0-7214-2860-4
22	1996	Meet the Dentist (Version 2)	978-0-14-055924-8
23	1996	Can Help Birds	978-0-216-91176-5
24	1997	and their New School Friend	978-0-14-056184-5
25	1997	Go in an Aeroplane (Version 3)	978-0-7214-2854-3
26	1997	Go On Holiday (Version 3)	978-0-216-92466-6
27	1997	Have Their Eyes Tested (Version 2)	978-0-14-055916-3
28	1998	Go on a Train (Version 3)	978-1-4093-1064-8
29	1998	Start School (Version 2)	978-0-7214-2841-3
30	1999	A Special Visit	978-0-7214-2041-7
31	1999	And The New Baby (Version 2)	978-0-7214-2851-2
32	1999	At the Farm (Version 3)	978-0-7214-2846-8
33	1999	Buckets and Spades	978-0-7214-2042-4
34	1999	Can Look After Their Pets (Version 3)	978-0-7214-2852-9
35	1999	First School Stories	978-0-7214-9787-7
36	1999	Go to Hospital (Version 2)	978-0-7214-2853-6
37	1999	Go to the Dentist (Version 3)	978-0-7214-2856-7
38	1999	Go to the Doctor (Version 2)	978-0-7214-2859-8
39	1999	Go to the Park (Version 2)	978-0-7214-2847-5
40	1999	Go to the Zoo (Version 2)	978-0-7214-2845-1
41	1999	Growing Up Stories	978-0-7214-9785-3
42	1999	Have a Birthday Party	978-0-7214-2849-9
43	1999	Learn to Swim (Version 3)	978-0-7214-2842-0
44	1999	Little Lost Rabbit (Version 1)	978-0-7214-1933-6
45	1999	Little Shoppers (Version 3)	978-0-7214-2044-8
46	1999	Meet the Ambulance Crew (Version 1)	978-0-7214-2860-4
47	1999	Meet the Police	978-0-7214-2858-1
48	1999	Old Shoes New Shoes (Version 2)	978-0-7214-2043-1
49	1999	Red Boots Yellow Boots	978-0-7214-1932-9
50	1999	The Big Surprise	978-0-7214-1934-3
51	2000	Word Book	978-0-7214-2217-6
52	2000	Go Out and About	-
53	2001	Learn ABC (Version 2)	978-0-7214-2371-5
54	2001	Learn About Time (Version 2)	978-0-7214-2372-2
55	2001	Learn Opposites	978-0-7214-2373-9
56	2001	Learn to Count (Version 2)	978-0-7214-2370-8
57	2003	At the Farm (Version 4)	978-1-904351-20-7
58	2003	Go to the Dentist (Version 4)	978-1-904351-27-6
59	2003	Go to the Doctor (Version 3)	978-1-904351-29-0
60	2003	Go to the Park (Version 3)	978-1-904351-22-1
61	2003	Go to the Zoo (Version 3)	978-1-904351-21-4
62	2003	Learn to Swim (Version 4)	978-1-904351-18-4
63	2003	Look After Their Pets (Version 4)	978-1-904351-23-8
64	2003	Meet the Firefighters (Version 2)	978-1-904351-31-3
65	2003	Meet the Police (Version 3)	978-1-904351-30-6
66	2003	Start School (Version 3)	978-1-904351-19-1
67	2003	The New Baby (Version 3)	978-1-904351-25-2
68	2004	Busy Builders	978-1-84422-312-1
69	2004	Little Lost Rabbit (Version 2)	978-1-84422-314-5
70	2004	Red Boots Yellow Boots (Version 2)	978-1-84422-311-4
71	2004	The Big Surprise (Version 2)	978-1-84422-313-8
72	2005	Have Itchy Heads	978-1-84422-581-1
73	2005	Help a Friend	978-1-84422-582-8
74	2005	Little ABC Library	-
75	2006	Have Chickenpox	978-1-84646-144-6
76	2006	New Lunchboxes	978-1-84646-141-5
77	2007	Go Camping (Version 3)	978-1-84646-583-3
78	2007	Go on a Train (Version 3)	978-1-84646-584-0

=== Third Generation: 2009–Ongoing ===
The third Generation of Topsy and Tim books, based on the original stories by Jean and Gareth Adamson, with modernised illustrations by Belinda Worsley.

#	Date	Title	ISBN-13
1	2009	Go on an Aeroplane (version 4)	978-1-4093-0057-1
2	2009	Go to the Zoo (version 4)	978-1-4093-0084-7
3	2009	Have a Birthday Party	978-1-4093-0061-8
4	2009	Learn to Swim (version 5)	978-1-4093-0060-1
5	2009	Little ABC Library (version 4)	978-1-4093-0226-1
6	2009	Start School (version 4)	978-1-4093-0083-0
7	2009	The New Baby (version 4)	978-1-4093-0056-4
8	2010	At the Farm (version 5)	978-1-4093-0336-7
9	2010	Go Camping (version 4)	978-1-4093-0333-6
10	2010	Go on a Train (version 5)	978-1-4093-0424-1
11	2010	Go to Hospital (version 3)	978-1-4093-0423-4
12	2010	Go to the Dentist	978-1-4093-0058-8
13	2010	Go to the Doctor	978-1-4093-0334-3
14	2010	Play Football (version 3)	978-1-4093-0335-0
15	2011	First Numbers	978-1-4093-0925-3
16	2011	First Writing	978-1-4093-0924-6
17	2011	Have Itchy Heads (version 2)	978-1-4093-0720-4
18	2011	Meet the Firefighters (version 3)	978-1-4093-0721-1
19	2011	Meet the Police (version 4)	978-1-4093-0883-6
20	2011	Safety First	978-1-4093-0882-9
21	2012	Visit London	978-1-4093-0947-5
22	2013	Meet Father Christmas	978-1-4093-1159-1
23	2013	The Big Race	978-0-7232-7385-1
24	2014	Go For Gold / Sports Day	978-1-4093-0946-8
25	2015	First Numbers Sticker Counting Book	978-0-7232-9463-4
26	2015	First Words	978-0-7232-9465-8
27	2015	Help a Friend (version 2)	978-0-7232-9259-3
28	2016	Our Day Clock (version 3)	978-0-241-19644-1
29	2017	Go on Holiday (version 3)	978-0-241-28255-7
30	2017	Have Their Eyes Tested (version 3)	978-0-241-28254-0
31	2019	Halloween Party	978-0-241-38616-3

=== Republished: 2020–Ongoing ===
Republications of the original Topsy and Tim books, bringing back the classic gouache illustrations by Jean Adamson.

#	Date	Title	ISBN-13
1	2020	On the Farm 60th Anniversary Edition	978-0-241-42046-1
