= TV Squash =

- Directed by: Vic Finch
- Starring: Geraldine McNulty; Andrew Dunn; Phil Nice
- Country of origin: United Kingdom
- No. of series: 1
- No. of episodes: 6

Production
- Running time: 30mins

Original release
- Network: ITV
- Release: 26 July – 30 August 1992

TV Squash was a British television satire show which was made by Yorkshire Television and ran for one series during the summer of 1992. Each of the six episodes parodied a day's television on a particular channel, squeezing the contents into half an hour. The weekday programming of all four main British television channels of the time (BBC One, BBC Two, ITV and Channel 4) was satirised in the first four episodes, while episodes five and six concentrated on a typical day's viewing on Saturday and Sunday on ITV.
