= UGetMe =

UGetMe was an interactive comedy/drama series centering on three best friends Joe, Kit and Carly and the radio station they run called "UGetMe". Written by Adrian Hewitt, Stuart Kenworthy and Steve Turner, directed by Otto Bathurst and Maddy Darrall and produced by Billy Macqueen and Maddy Darrall at Darrall Macqueen Ltd. The series was broadcast on CBBC and BBC One from 2003.

== Cast ==
- Joe – Luke Bailey
- Kit – Kieri Kennedy
- Carly – Dominique Moore
- Ben – Josh Herdman
- Ash – Kavi Shastri
- Calvin – Reggie Yates
- Marie – Melissa Batchelor
- Luke – Peter Kelly
- Simone – Rebecca Hunter
- Mia – Alice Connor
