= Dominique Moore =

British actress

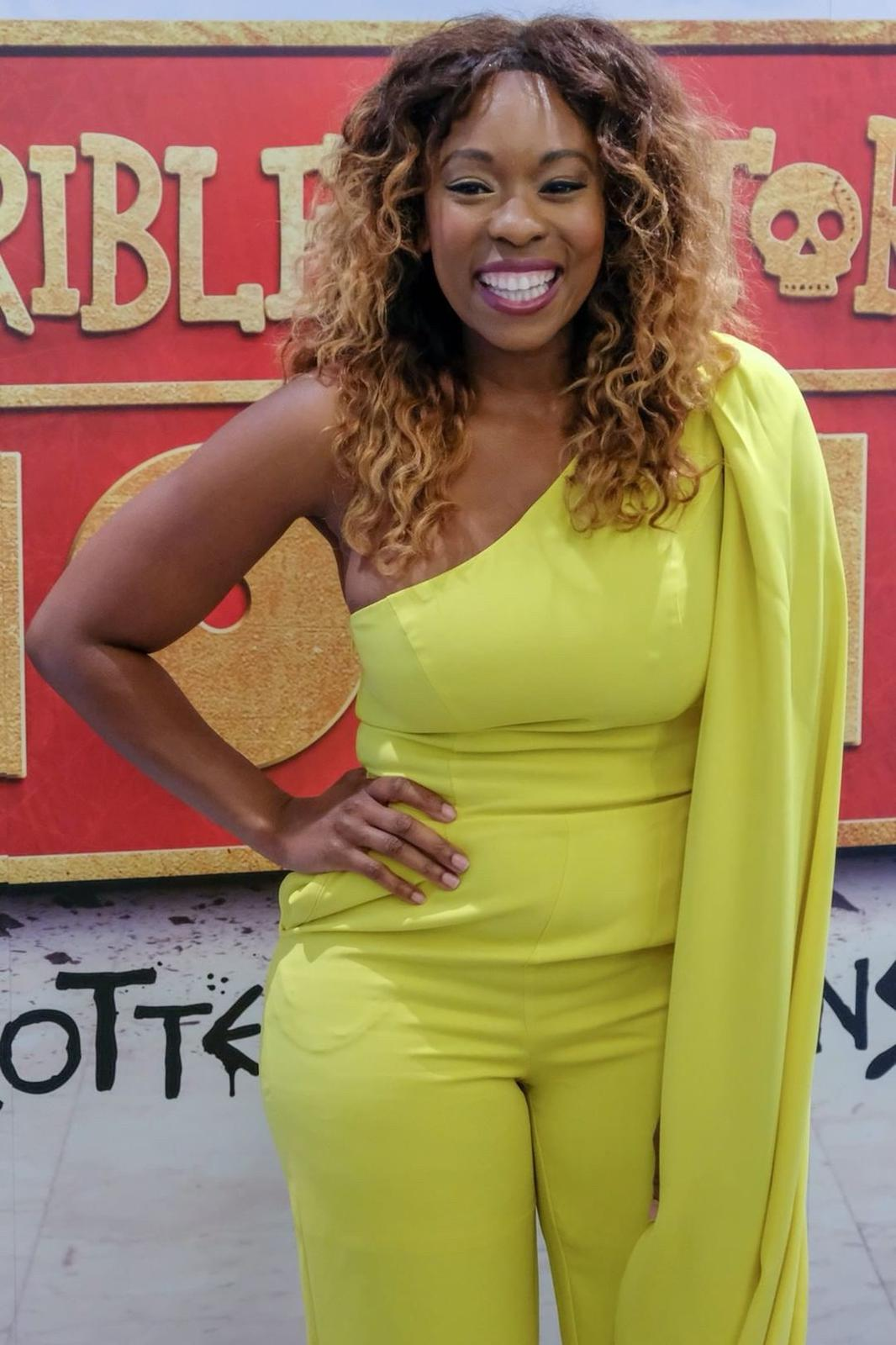
- Moore at Horrible Histories premiere in 2019
- Occupation: Actress
- Years active: 1997–present

Dominique Moore is a British actress. She is best known for her roles in the BAFTA winning Horrible Histories, Hotel Trubble and Paddington Green. She starred in Horrible Histories: The Movie – Rotten Romans (2019) and voices the character of Lulu in Disney's Sadie Sparks.

Moore is a former pupil of Sylvia Young Theatre School. The BBC fly-on-the-wall documentary series Paddington Green followed her as she won a scholarship and attended auditions.

== Acting career ==
=== Theatre ===
Moore began her acting career appearing in various West End musicals including Oliver!, Hey! Mr Producer, Annie and Whistle Down the Wind. She played Young Nala in the original cast of The Lion King at the Lyceum Theatre. In 2013, Moore played Sinai in Gutted at Theatre Royal Stratford East.

In 2017, Moore was cast as Lottie alongside David Tennant in Patrick Maber's Don Juan in Soho at Wydnham's Theatre.

=== Television ===
In 2000, Moore began her on screen career in Channel 4's Get Up, Stand Up before landing roles in CBBC shows The Queen's Nose, The Crust, UGetMe, Stupid!, and Hotel Trubble.

From 2005 to 2006, Moore played Chanel O'Grady in Footballers' Wives: Extra Time.

In 2008, Moore was cast in Disney's Life Bites. Following her success she featured in Disney Movie Surfers Race to Witch Mountain and Prince of Persia: The Sands of Time.

Moore has played various roles in the multi award-winning Horrible Histories. Her portrayal of Mary Seacole and Rosa Parks gained her much recognition in the press and from celebrities including Eddie Izzard, Adrian Lester and Tanya Franks. She has appeared in sketches on Little Miss Jocelyn and in 2008 she appeared in the BBC Three show Barely Legal. In 2009 she played Aretha in the CBBC musical comedy My Almost Famous Family.

Moore is the voice of Flo in Channel 5's animation Floogals. In 2017, Moore played recurring roles in the hit Tracey Ullman's Show on BBC One and HBO. She also featured in Tracey Ullman's Tracey Breaks the News.

Moore appears as Rosie in the 2019 adaptation of Four Weddings and a Funeral.

=== Film ===
In 2013, Moore starred opposite Oscar winner Ben Kingsley in The Physician. She features in the 2018 television film Torvill & Dean directed by Gillies MacKinnon.

== Other work ==
In 1999, Moore recorded a version of the Cyndi Lauper hit "True Colours" for a Peugeot 406 commercial. Moore sings the theme tune for Hotel Trubble and co-wrote "The Musical" episode in Series 3.

After her experience as a model in Paris, Moore was inspired by fashion design and started her own label Anita Moore Designs funded by The Prince's Trust.

Moore founded Dominique Moore Arts (DMA) in May 2016. Owing to her successful and expansive career, she now mentors young professional actors all over the world. DMA has working relationships with a number of industry professionals and productions that provide opportunities for the young talent she works with.

== Personal life ==
In 2010, Moore was diagnosed with Hodgkin lymphoma after discovering a lump on the back of her neck whilst filming on the set of Hotel Trubble. She received treatment and was declared cancer-free in 2011. An edition of Newsround called "Dominique presents Living with Cancer - a Newsround Special" in 2011 described how she coped.

In 2015, Moore gave birth to her son. She is engaged to British comedian Kevin J.

== Filmography ==
=== Film ===
Year	Title	Role	Notes
2008	Dis/Connected	Emily	Television film
2008	Barely Legal		Television film
2009	Surfers		Television film
2013	The Physician	Despina	
2016	FIRST		Short film
2018	Torvill & Dean	Shirley	Television film
2019	Horrible Histories: The Movie – Rotten Romans	Traveller	

=== Television ===
Year	Film	Role	Notes
1998	Hey, Mr. Producer! The Musical World of Cameron Mackintosh	Herself	
1998–1999	Paddington Green	Herself	
1999	8:50 to Paddington Green	Herself	Spinoff from series
2000–2003	The Queen's Nose	Sophie	19 episodes
2001	The Bill	Cassie Harris	2 episodes
2003–2005	UGetMe	Carly	19 episodes
2004	Stupid!	Various	10 episodes
2005	Casualty	Ruby Cram	Episode: "Hoping, Wishing, Longing"
2005	The Crust	Angel	15 episodes
2005–2006	Footballers' Wives: Extra Time	Chanel O'Grady	16 episodes
2008	Little Miss Jocelyn	Various	2 episodes
2008	Life Bites	Esther	16 episodes
2008–2011	Hotel Trubble	Sally	35 episodes
2009	My Almost Famous Family	Aretha	11 episodes
2009–2014	Horrible Histories	Various	
2013	Jedward's Big Adventure	Herself	1 episode
2014	Holby City	Zara Holt	Episode: "Bounce Back"
2015	Dani's Castle	Inspector	Episode: "An Inspector Calls"
2015–2018	The Dog Ate My Homework	Panelist	7 episodes
2016	Horrible Histories Gory Games	Various	3 episodes
2016	Red Dwarf	Ankita	Episode: "Can of Worms"
2016–2018	Floogals	Flo	Voice; 94 episodes
2017	Murder in Successville	Serena Williams	Episode: "A Nest of Vipers"
2017–2018	Tracey Ullman's Show	Rachel	5 episodes
2019	Four Weddings and a Funeral	Rosie	2 episodes
2019	A Confession	Paula	2 episodes
2019	Sadie Sparks	Lulu	Voice
2020–2021	Thomas & Friends	Ruth	Voice

=== Video games ===
Year	Title	Role	Notes
2022	Xenoblade Chronicles 3	Ghondor	
