= Darrall Macqueen =

English television production company

Darrall Macqueen Ltd
- Industry: Television
- Genre: Children's television
- Founded: 2000; 26 years ago
- Founder: Billy Macqueen; Maddy Darrall
- Headquarters: London, England
- Website: www.darrallmacqueen.com

Darrall Macqueen Ltd is an independent children's television production company based in London, United Kingdom. It was formed in 2000 by ex-Disney execs Billy Macqueen and Maddy Darrall. The company is known for producing series such as Smile, Bear Behaving Badly, Baby Jake, and the 2015 reboot of Teletubbies.

== History ==
Darrall Macqueen's first production was a converged TV/web event week for ITV in July 2000 called Mouse. In 2002 Darrall Macqueen produced Smile, which ran from 2002 until 2007. Then they produced CBBC's interactive drama series UGetMe.

In 2004, Darrall Macqueen created a live-action comedy called The Crust, a 15-part urban sitcom.

In 2004, Darrall Macqueen made a series of 13 high octane game shows for CITV called Play the Game, and, in 2005, Darrall Macqueen was asked to produce CiTV's thrill seeking action series Feel the Fear, starring Steve Wilson and Holly Willoughby. In 2006 they produced 30 comedy animal tales for CiTV called Animal Spies, which featured the voice talent of Lenny Henry and Ricky Tomlinson.

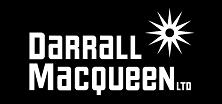
Logo used until 2022.

In September 2005 Australian company Southern Star took a majority shareholding in Darrall Macqueen. Southern Star, who already owned Carnival Films and Oxford Scientific Films in the UK, were then bought by Southern Cross, who in turn were purchased by Fairfax Media. When Endemol took over Fairfax Media in 2009 founders Maddy Darrall and Billy Macqueen bought the company back to be run as an independent under their shared ownership.

At the 2006 Children's BAFTAs, Darrall Macqueen won the inaugural BAFTA for Production Company of the Year.

In 2007, Darrall Macqueen created Bear Behaving Badly for CBBC, a 26-part slapstick sitcom for 7–11 year olds. From 2008 to 2010, Darrall Macqueen created and produced weekend pre-school brand The Fluffy Club for ITV and GMTV.

In 2009, Darrall Macqueen developed a comedy animation series called Pet Squad with Irish comedian/writer Caimh McDonnell. In 2011, it won its first commission from CBeebies to make a pre-school series called Baby Jake.

In 2015, Darrall Macqueen with WildBrain (known as DHX Media at the time) and CBeebies rebooted classic British children's television series Teletubbies.

== Awards ==
- 2005: Children's BAFTA to Smile for Best Interactive Programme
- 2005: The Indie Award to Smile for Best Interactive Media
- 2006: Children's BAFTA for Production Company of the Year
- 2007: Children's BAFTA to Barney Harwood for Best Presenter
- 2013: Broadcast Award to "Baby Jake" for Best Pre School Programme
- 2016: Children's BAFTA to "Topsy and Tim" for Best Pre School Live Action
- 2017: Broadcast Award to "Topsy and Tim" for Best Pre School Programme
- 2022: Children's BAFTA to "Lovely Little Farm" for Best Pre School Live Action
- 2023: Broadcast Award to "Lovely Little Farm" for Best Pre-School programme
- 2024: Venice TV Award to "Lovely Little Farm' for Children and Youth

== Nominations ==
- 2024: Children's & Family EMMYS to "Lovely Little Farm" for Preschool Series

== Productions ==
- Smile
- UGetMe
- The Crust
- Feel the Fear
- Bear Behaving Badly
- Hi-5 UK
- The Fluffy Club
- Baby Jake
- Topsy and Tim
- Teletubbies (2015-2018)
- Chip and Potato
- Waffle the Wonder Dog
- Lovely Little Farm
- Waffle's After School Club
