= List of Waterloo Road producers =

This is a list of producers who have been involved in the making of the BBC school drama Waterloo Road, and have received crediting for their role.

== Producers ==
Producer	Tenure	Series
Claire Phillips	2006	Series 1
Sue de Beauvoir	2007	Series 2
Liz Steele	2007–2008	Series 3
Sharon Hughff	2009	Series 4
Sharon Channer	2009–2010	Series 4 to Series 6
Jane Hudson	2009–2011	Series 5 to Series 6
Tom Mullens	2011	Series 6 to Series 7
Lucy Martin	2011–2012	Series 7
Lizzie Gray	2012–2014	Series 8 to Series 10
Nicola Larder	2012–2013	Series 8
Simon Meyers	2013–2014	Series 9
Fiona Black	2014	Series 10
Kate Crowther	2014–2015	Series 10
Adam Leatherland	2023–present	Series 11 to present
Diva Rodriguez	2024	Series 13
Claire Burgess	2024	Series 13
Nasreen Ahmed	2024–2025	Series 14 to Series 15
Laurie Kirkham	2025–present	Series 15 to present
Gemma Wright	2025	Series 16

== Executive producers ==
Executive producer	Tenure	Series
John Yorke	2006	Series 1
Anne Mensah	2006–2008	Series 1 to Series 3
Kathryn Mitchell	2006	Series 1
Brian Park	2006–2009 2014–2015	Series 1 to Series 4 Series 9 to Series 10
Ann Harrison-Baxter	2007	Series 2
Spencer Campbell	2007–2009	Series 3 to Series 4
Gaynor Holmes	2009–2013 2023–present	Series 4 to Series 8 Series 11 to present
Ann McManus	2009–2011	Series 4 to Series 6
Sharon Hughff	2009–2012	Series 5 to Series 7
Liz Steele	2010–2011	Series 6
Claire Ingham	2011–2012	Series 7
Cameron Roach	2011–2013 2023–present	Series 7 to Series 8 Series 11 to present
Claire Mundell	2013–2014	Series 9
Johann Knobel	2014–2015	Series 10
John Griffin	2014–2015	Series 10
Jo McClellan	2023–present	Series 11 to present

== Line Producers ==
Line Producer	Tenure	Series
Josh Dynevor	2006	Series 1
Alison Gee	2007	Series 2
Jonathan Leather	2008–2011	Series 4 to Series 7
Emily Russell	2011	Series 7
Brian Kaczynski	2012	Series 8
Fiona Black	2012–2014	Series 8 to Series 9
Maureen Macphee	2014	Series 10
Steven Little	2015	Series 10
Richard Everiss	2023–2025	Series 11 to Series 15
Eugenio Perez	2024	Series 14
Michelle Brown	2025	Series 15
Sam Furgeson	2025–present	Series 15 to present

== Series producers ==
Series Producer	Tenure	Series
Sharon Hughff	2009	Series 4
Tim Key	2011	Series 7
Simon Meyers	2014	Series 10
Huw Kennair-Jones	2015	Series 10
Lindsay Williams	2023–present	Series 11 to present
