= Waterloo Road series 2 =

Waterloo Road
- Series 2
- DVD cover
- Starring: Jason Merrells; Jamie Glover; Angela Griffin; Jason Done; Jill Halfpenny; Denise Welch; Christine Tremarco; Philip Martin Brown; Camilla Power; Nick Sidi
- No. of episodes: 12

Release
- Original network: BBC One
- Original release: 18 January – 26 April 2007

Series chronology
- ← Previous; Series 1 Next → Series 3

The second series of Waterloo Road, a British television school drama series, created by Ann McManus and Maureen Chadwick and produced by BBC Scotland and Shed Productions, commenced airing in the United Kingdom on 18 January 2007 and concluded after 12 episodes on 26 April 2007.

Waterloo Road's second series aired in the United Kingdom on Thursdays at 8:00 pm GMT on BBC One, a terrestrial television network, where it received an average of 4.80 million viewers per episode.

== Plot ==
The show follows the lives of the teachers and the pupils at the eponymous school of Waterloo Road, a failing inner-city comprehensive, tackling a wide range of issues often seen as taboo such as bullying, alcoholism, multiple sclerosis, losing a baby, an affair between a teacher and a pupil, online abuse, overactive bladder syndrome, suicide, knife crime and drug abuse.

=== Premise ===
Following the events of the series one finale, it is revealed that English teacher Lorna Dickey (Camilla Power) survived what was portrayed as a suicide attempt. Her former husband Tom Clarkson (Jason Done) and previous best friend Izzie Redpath (Jill Halfpenny) continue their relationship, with Izzie now pregnant, making life in the staff room very difficult for all parties and even more so when tragedy strikes for both Tom and Izzie and Lorna, who is diagnosed with multiple sclerosis.

The second series included the arrival of prospective school governor Roger Aspinall (Nick Sidi), who promised to invest in the future of the school in return for a seat on the governing body, having got the final decision back from the LEA at the end of series one that the school would remain open. Roger's son Brett (Tom Payne) enrolls at the school and is later involved in one of the major plots this series when he starts an affair with the new, glamorous school secretary, Davina Shackleton (Christine Tremarco).

Other major plots were the drug-dealing antics of two pupils which later ends in the violent stabbing of one of the school's teachers, the alcoholism of trainee teacher Russell Millen, the bullying and attempted suicide of Mika Grainger (Lauren Drummond) and the return of former pupil Maxine Barlow (Ellie Paskell), who is later fostered by the school's French teacher Steph Haydock (Denise Welch).

The series ended with the school's board of governors preparing to make a decision on who should take up the position of becoming Waterloo Road's Head on a permanent basis.

== Cast ==
=== Staff ===
- Jason Merrells as Jack Rimmer; Headteacher (12 episodes)
- Jamie Glover as Andrew Treneman; Deputy Headteacher and English teacher (12 episodes)
- Angela Griffin as Kim Campbell; Head of Pastoral Care and Art teacher (12 episodes)
- Jason Done as Tom Clarkson; English teacher (12 episodes)
- Jill Halfpenny as Izzie Redpath; Head of Drama (12 episodes)
- Denise Welch as Steph Haydock; Head of French (12 episodes)
- Christine Tremarco as Davina Shackleton; School secretary (12 episodes)
- Philip Martin Brown as Grantly Budgen; Head of English (11 episodes)
- Camilla Power as Lorna Dickey; English teacher (10 episodes)
- Nick Sidi as Roger Aspinall; Investor (7 episodes)

=== Pupils ===
- Adam Thomas as Donte Charles (12 episodes)
- Katie Griffiths as Chlo Grainger (12 episodes)
- Lauren Drummond as Mika Grainger (12 episodes)
- Tom Payne as Brett Aspinall (12 episodes)
- Chelsee Healey as Janeece Bryant (9 episodes)
- Ellie Paskell as Maxine Barlow (8 episodes)
- Craig Fitzpatrick as Lewis Seddon; ex-pupil (7 episodes)
- Zeriozha Burtt-Skeete as Celine Dixon (4 episodes)
- Holly Grainger as Stacey Appleyard (4 episodes)
- Holly Matthews as Leigh-Ann Galloway (3 episodes)

=== Others ===
==== Recurring ====
- Mikey North as Helmsley; Lewis's friend (4 episodes)
- Robert Angell as Nigel Hinchcliffe; Chair of Governors (2 episodes)
- Paul Birchard as Jerry Preston; Investor (2 episodes)
- Kathryn Hunt as Gemma Seddon; Drug dealer and Lewis's aunt (2 episodes)
- Michael Keogh as Jed Seddon; Drug dealer and Lewis's cousin (2 episodes)
- Gary Whitaker as Kevin Hurst; Canteen Assistant (2 episodes)

==== Guest ====
- Robert Beck as Terry Appleyard; Stacey's father (1 episode)
- Stuart Graham as Russell Millen; Supply teacher and ex-police officer (1 episode)
- Michelle Holmes as Lyndsay Woodham; Headteacher candidate for Waterloo Road (1 episode)
- Jack O'Connell as Dale Baxter; Pupil (1 episode)
- Daisy Wignall as Holly Tattersall; Pupil (1 episode)

== Production ==
Waterloo Road was recommissioned by Shed Productions alongside BBC Scotland for a run of 12 sixty-minute episodes. The series was again set in Rochdale, England, with filming based in the same location and starting in 2006. Regularly, music was taken from the Cornish band Thirteen Senses. Due to copyright issues, some music is unavailable on the DVD release in all regions.

=== Casting ===
The second series featured a number of new characters, including new pupil Brett Aspinall (Tom Payne) and his father, the school's prospective governor and investor, Roger Aspinall (Nick Sidi), alongside Davina Shackleton (Christine Tremarco), the new school secretary. The series also introduced Zeriozha Burtt-Skeete as pupil Celine Dixon, Holly Matthews as the scheming pupil Leigh-Ann Galloway, Holly Grainger as Stacey Appleyard, a pupil with a dangerous schoolgirl crush and Ellie Paskell as Maxine Barlow, a pupil who is in trouble and who has returned to Waterloo Road.

== Episodes ==
No.	Title	Directed by	Written by	Original release date	UK viewers (million)
9	"Episode 1"	Barnaby Southcombe	Ann McManus & Maureen Chadwick	18 January 2007	4.93
With the school gates remaining open for the foreseeable future, a new sixth form is set up and private investor Roger Aspinall promises to invest in Waterloo Road in return for a seat on the school's governing body. However, Roger's proposed changes cause a stir in the staff room. Elsewhere, Izzie and Tom have been enjoying living together, but the return to work brings with it the return of a familiar face. Roger's son Brett enrols at Waterloo Road and ends up coming between Mika Grainger and her best friend, Leigh-Ann Galloway. Note: First appearance of Roger and Brett Aspinall, and Davina Shackleton.
10	"Episode 2"	Barnaby Southcombe	Ann McManus & Maureen Chadwick	25 January 2007	N/A (<4.66) (Note: Not reported in the weekly top 30 programmes for BBC One.)
Furious that Andrew has accepted Roger's offer to make him the new Headteacher, Jack prepares to take matters into his own hands. Sooner rather than later though, Andrew is forced to ask Jack for help when ex-pupil Lewis Seddon terrorises a member of the local community. Now that Lorna has moved in with Tom and Izzie, things become even more awkward in both the staff room and at home, and Grantly's suspension from teaching means trouble for Jack. Note: First appearance of Celine Dixon.
11	"Episode 3"	Jim Loach	Harriet Warner	1 February 2007	N/A (<4.38)
Leigh-Ann turns on Mika and posts topless images of her. Steph tries to help Mika, but things do not go as planned, forcing the teenager to reveal all to Izzie and Tom. New school secretary Davina Shackleton is in for a shock when she discovers a former lover is now a pupil at Waterloo Road. Donte and Chlo plan to have sex for the first time, but Lewis intends to teach them a lesson first.
12	"Episode 4"	Jim Loach	Ann McManus & Maureen Chadwick	8 February 2007	4.77
Jack and Roger come to blows over the future of Waterloo Road, as Brett learns some hard-hitting home truths about his father. Elsewhere, Steph is mugged by a former pupil. Note: First appearance of Maxine Barlow.
13	"Episode 5"	Farren Blackburn	Harriet Warner	15 February 2007	4.45
The school is on high alert following the attack on a female pupil, Tom is flattered by what seems like a harmless schoolgirl crush and Lorna receives some devastating news.
14	"Episode 6"	Farren Blackburn	Phil Ford	22 February 2007	4.64
Tom's teaching career and his relationship with Izzie hang in the balance while Kim and Andrew reluctantly work together to get to the truth behind a pupil's allegations. Maxine finds out the identity of the attacker.
15	"Episode 7"	Mike Cocker	Ann McManus & Maureen Chadwick	1 March 2007	4.64
A student teacher struggles on his first day at Waterloo Road and ends up turning to alcohol. Jack gives Davina an opportunity to prove herself in the classroom, and Steph tries to find troubled schoolgirl Maxine a new place to live.
16	"Episode 8"	Mike Cocker	Harriet Warner	29 March 2007	4.76
Jack and Kim are humiliated when a work experience placement goes disastrously wrong, and Steph puts her reputation on the line to speak up for Maxine. Davina finally lets Jack know her true feelings for him.
17	"Episode 9"	David Innes Edwards	Ann McManus & Anne Marie O'Connor	5 April 2007	4.85
Lorna gets to the heart of a persistent truant's real problem as Jack feels his role as Headteacher slipping away during the final interviews for permanent Headship. Izzie and Tom's bitterness towards each other escalates.
18	"Episode 10"	David Innes Edwards	Harriet Warner	12 April 2007	5.09
Lorna plays cupid, but appears to have ulterior motives. Steph's attempts to warn Jack about Davina backfires. Note: Final appearance of Lorna Dickey.
19	"Episode 11"	Lance Kneeshaw	Phil Ford	19 April 2007	4.77
The school's healthy eating initiative does not go to plan after a local gang targets Waterloo Road. Later, a pupil collapses and is rushed to hospital.
20	"Episode 12"	Lance Kneeshaw	Harriet Warner	26 April 2007	5.06
Jack is determined to protect the pupils and staff of Waterloo Road, but his determination brings with it a risk of mayhem that may hinder his chances at becoming the school's permanent Headteacher. Kim makes a big decision that affects her future at both the school and her relationship with Andrew. Note: Final appearance of Roger Aspinall, Kim Campbell (until Series 4), Andrew Treneman (until Series 4 Episode 19) and Izzie Redpath

== DVD release ==
The second series of Waterloo Road was released on DVD in the UK on 10 March 2008, published by 2entertain. The set includes all twelve episodes on a four-disc set. The set includes special features, Miss Haydock Reveals All, and Mika's Video Diary. It was released with a "12" British Board of Film Classification (BBFC) certificate (meaning it is unsuitable for viewing by those under the age of 12 years).
