= Waterloo Road series 1 =

Waterloo Road
- Series 1
- DVD cover
- Starring: Jason Merrells; Angela Griffin; Denise Welch; Jill Halfpenny; Jason Done; Camilla Power; Jamie Glover
- No. of episodes: 8

Release
- Original network: BBC One
- Original release: 9 March – 27 April 2006

Series chronology
- Next → Series 2

The first series of the British television series Waterloo Road originally aired on BBC One in the United Kingdom between 9 March and 27 April 2006. The series follows the staff and pupils of the fictional Waterloo Road comprehensive school in Greater Manchester. Eight hour-long episodes were commissioned. Produced by Shed Productions, the series was created by Ann McManus and Maureen Chadwick, and executively produced by Brian Park. McManus was asked to devise a contemporary drama that ordinary British people would relate to and chose to centre it around teachers in a failing comprehensive school, having had such experience herself. A drama focusing on teachers was uncommon at the time as they were normally portrayed through the eyes of children, but McManus wanted to portray teachers as humans instead.

The series was filmed at a former infant school, which closed days before the production team discovered it. They liked that it was fresh and not neglected, so took the site for filming. Set designers worked extensively to make the set suitable for filming. Costumes for the school's students were carefully designed by the costume design team, with a badge, crest and motto created for the fictional school. The progression in costumes were designed to match the progression in the school's story and characters' behaviour.

Waterloo Road won the Best New Drama award at the 2006 TV Quick and TV Choice Awards for series 1. The series received a mixed response from television critics. Paul English from the Daily Record called it unrealistic and boring, whilst his colleague described it as "a real winner". It received criticism from the Association of School and College Leaders (ASCL) for its inaccurate representation of teachers and school leaders.

== Premise ==
The series follows the staff and pupils of the fictional Waterloo Road comprehensive school in Rochdale, Greater Manchester. The school is portrayed as failing and near the bottom of the school league tables with "despondent" teachers whose personal lives are problematic. The show's first series follows the implementation of a new leadership team, following the breakdown of the existing headteacher, as they work together to enhance the school and prevent it from being closed by the local education authority (LEA). The series also explores the implications of underage and drink driving when a student is killed in an incident. Other topical and taboo issues are also explored throughout the series.

== Episodes ==
No.	Title	Directed by	Written by	Original release date	UK viewers (million)
1	"Episode 1"	Barnaby Southcombe	Ann McManus & Maureen Chadwick	9 March 2006	5.03
Jack Rimmer is put in charge of failing, inner-city comprehensive Waterloo Road after the previous headteacher has a mental breakdown after 30 years at the school. Jack takes a big risk by employing Andrew Treneman, a man more familiar with the upper class, to help him turn the school around. English teacher Tom Clarkson is having second thoughts about his marriage to Lorna Dickey, instead finding himself falling for Drama teacher Izzie Redpath. Donte Charles, a rebellious pupil, strikes up trouble for Izzie's daughter, Chlo.
2	"Episode 2"	Barnaby Southcombe	Ann McManus & Maureen Chadwick	16 March 2006	4.56
Waterloo Road is in mourning following a fatal car crash that killed one of its pupils and has left another in a deep coma. When rumours circulate about what happened the night of the crash, Donte, the driver, faces the wrath of the entire school. Elsewhere, Izzie is still reeling after Tom kissed her at his wedding reception and Andrew and Kim begin to settle their differences.
3	"Episode 3"	Julie Edwards	Ann McManus & Maureen Chadwick	23 March 2006	4.47
Heavily pregnant, fifteen-year-old Zoe Ramsden starts school at Waterloo Road, but even before she has had her first lesson, Andrew predicts trouble. Lorna is driving Tom away from her and both of them find comfort in best friend Izzie. Chlo is terrified that Holly will wake up from her coma and reveal what really happened the night of the car crash.
4	"Episode 4"	Julie Edwards	Ann McManus & Maureen Chadwick	30 March 2006	4.59
Izzie is in for a shock when she finds out that her ex-husband is parading around on top of the school dressed in a rabbit costume, protesting for fathers to have fair and equal rights to see their children. Steph's marking is under fire and Andrew reprimands Lewis Seddon by making him scrub graffiti. Tom and Lorna's marriage is in a rut.
5	"Episode 5"	Ian Bevitt	Steve Griffiths	6 April 2006	4.86
Lorna remains surprisingly upbeat despite the breakdown of her marriage, while her best friend Izzie is being chased by Tom, the man Lorna has just broken up with. Izzie has feelings for him too and may not be able to deny them any longer. Pupil Zak continues to be late to his classes, prompting Head of English Grantly Budgen to keep a closer eye on him, and Chlo goes to extreme lengths to prove to Izzie that she was the one who caused the car crash.
6	"Episode 6"	Ian Bevitt	Harry Wootliff	13 April 2006	4.07
Jack panics about the impending visit by an inspector, but the inspector turns out to be both attractive and sympathetic to the pressures the school is under. However, she has a secret that could pose the end for Waterloo Road. Meanwhile, Chlo visits the school psychologist, after confessing that she was driving the limo the night Adam Deardon was killed.
7	"Episode 7"	Jim Loach	Shaun Duggan	20 April 2006	4.33
Jack, Andrew and Kim organise an Open Day at Waterloo Road to impress the Local Education Authority, in a last attempt to keep the school open. Kim is put in a terrifying situation when she is cornered by bully Lewis Seddon. Izzie warns Tom that he needs to be honest with Lorna about what he feels for her.
8	"Episode 8"	Jim Loach	Ann McManus & Maureen Chadwick	27 April 2006	4.47
The Local Education Authority make a decision that will impact the school of Waterloo Road forever. Kim has doubts that she can remain at the same school as Lewis following her attack. Following the breakdown of her marriage, Lorna puts on a brave face in the staff room.

== Cast ==
Series one cast

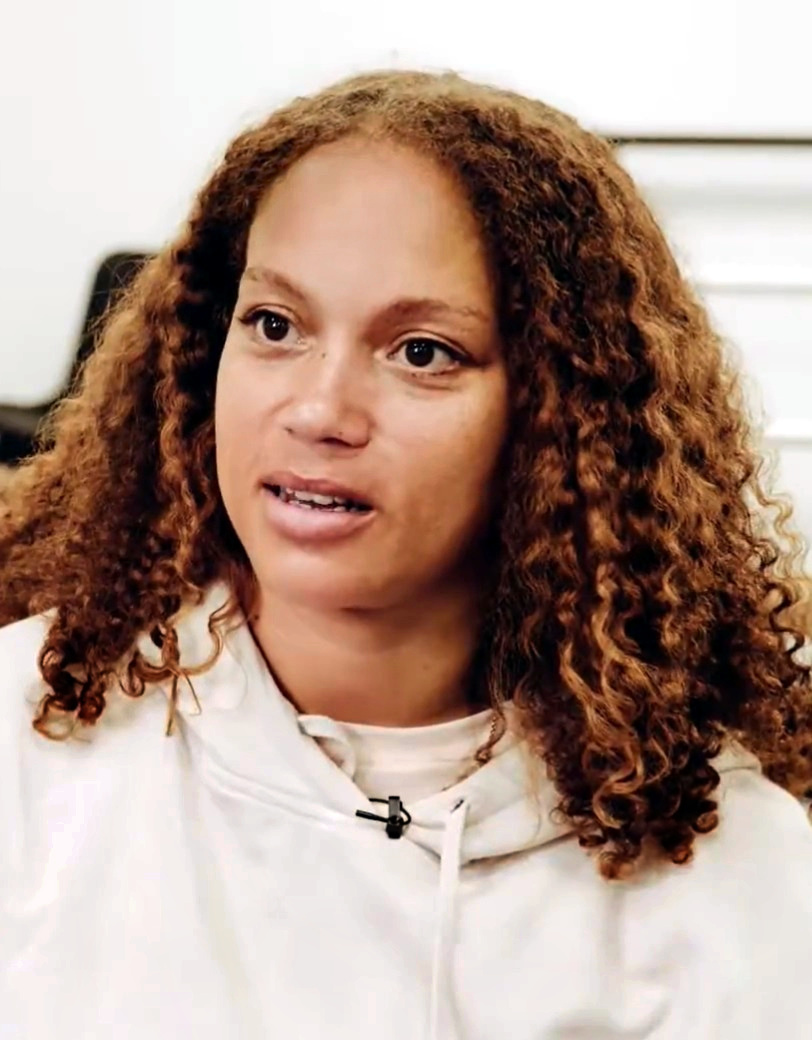
Angela Griffin plays Kim Campbell.

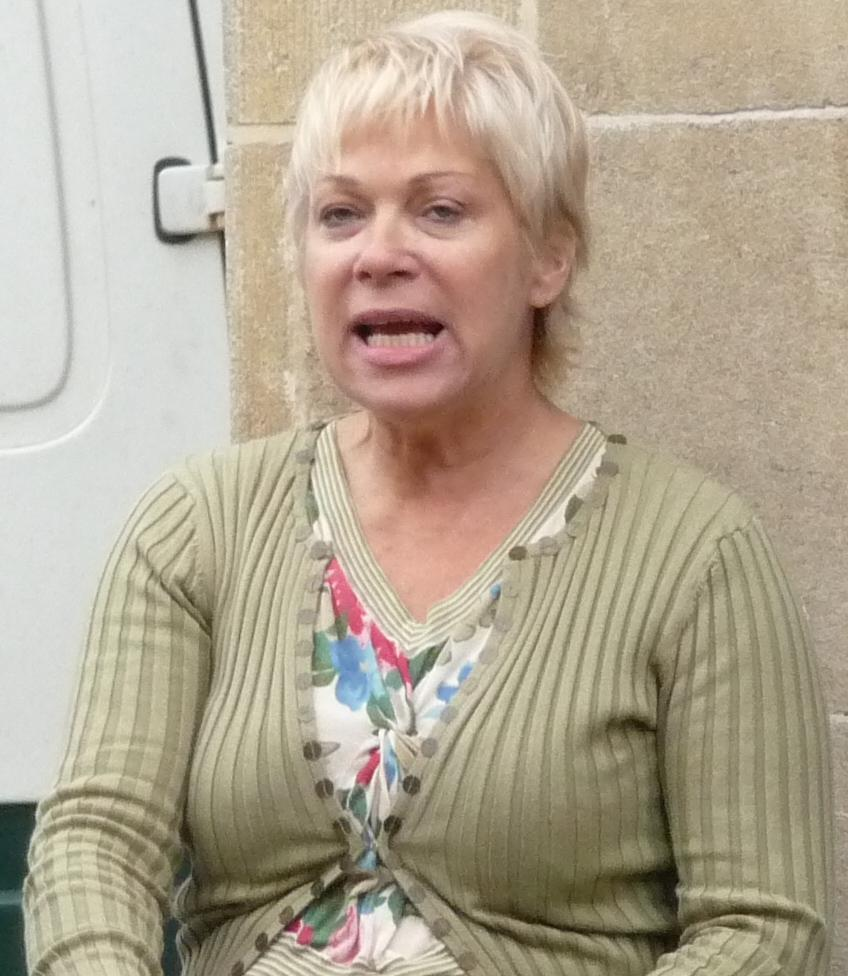
Denise Welch portrays Steph Haydock.

=== Main cast ===
- Jason Merrells as Jack Rimmer
- Angela Griffin as Kim Campbell
- Denise Welch as Steph Haydock
- Jill Halfpenny as Izzie Redpath
- Jason Done as Tom Clarkson
- Camilla Power as Lorna Dickey
- Jamie Glover as Andrew Treneman

=== Supporting cast ===
- Rhea Bailey as Yasmin Deardon
- Judith Barker as Estelle Cooper
- Philip Martin Brown as Grantly Budgen
- Lauren Drummond as Mika Grainger
- Katie Griffiths as Chlo Grainger
- Chelsee Healey as Janeece Bryant
- Craig Fitzpatrick as Lewis Seddon
- Adam Thomas as Donte Charles
- Daisy Wignall as Holly Tattersall

=== Recurring cast ===
- David Crellin as Jimmy Grainger
- Steve Money as Clarence Charles
- Anna Wilson-Jones as Heather Davenport

=== Guest cast ===
- Robert Angell as Nigel Hinchcliffe
- Sherry Baines as Brenda Brears
- Jon Ball as Adam Deardon
- Claire Cooper as Zoe Ramsden
- Josh Hanlon as Rory Brears
- Jordan Murphy as Hadleigh Flynn
- Marc Silcock as Anthony Sugden
- Shane Zaza as Ahmed Patel

== Production ==
Waterloo Road was co-created by Ann McManus and Maureen Chadwick in 2005 after John Yorke, the controller of Drama at the BBC, asked McManus to devise a contemporary drama that ordinary British people would relate to. After spending five years as a secondary school teacher in deprived areas of Glasgow, McManus decided to set the series in a modern comprehensive school and focuses it mainly around the teaching staff. She believed that teachers were "at the front line of humanity" and their jobs could impact everyone's lives, so a drama centering around how children were given "the best start in life" would be ideal. At this point, it was uncommon to have a drama or soap opera about teachers as they were usually just portrayed through the lens of children, shown to be "walking textbooks or implausible heroes". McManus wanted children to be viewed through the eyes of the teachers, so co-devised Waterloo Road. Teachers were placed at the heart of the series. McManus thought that "motivated and inspiring" teachers were the most valuable tool in a challenging school and wanted the series to improve how the public view teachers and education. McManus was keen not to write all teachers in a positive light and wanted to be realistic that some are also "lazy and almost criminally bad at their jobs".

The series was produced by Shed Productions and executively produced by Brian Park. Production of the series was considered a challenge for the production team due to the quick turnaround required. Phillips believed that the team rose to the challenge and created a "classy piece of drama". When casting for the main characters, producers met with lots of actors. Phillips knew who she wanted to cast as soon as they read for the role and felt that each actor was perfectly cast in their roles. A local casting director was hired to find students for the series. Hundreds of young actors auditioned for the series. The casting team were impressed with the amount of young talent that auditioned and devised additional roles for many actors. McManus and Chadwick wrote the majority of the series, although other writers were hired for some episodes. The writing team also spoke to teachers to support their portrayal of a modern comprehensive school. McManus liked this as it added authenticy to the scripts.

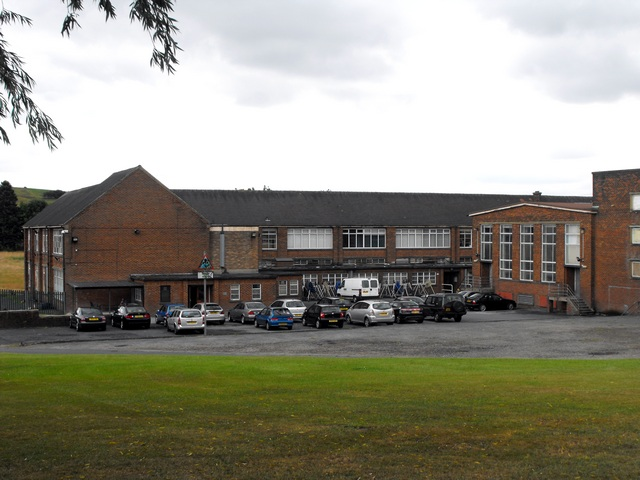
Filming primarily took place at the former Hill Top Primary School site.

Filming of the series primarily took place at the former site of Hill Top Primary School in Kirkholt, Rochdale. The site is located in the middle of a housing estate and was previously used as an infant school. The set designers had to dispose of the school's small furniture and replace it with equipment reflective of the show's fictional setting. Having spent lots of time searching for a location that would suit the show, producers found Hill Top Primary School five days after it closed. Claire Phillips, the series producer, decided that it was the perfect location as soon as she walked inside the site due to its lack of vandalism and neglect. Other sites had experienced such neglect after becoming empty for an extended period of time. Jason Merrells, who portrays headteacher Jack Rimmer, found the set "authentic" to a school setting and thought it was ideal for the story.

The costumes for the student characters were carefully considered by the costume design team. The school badge and crest was designed by Paul Rowan, the show's designer. Phillips praised the work of Rowan and the set design team. She felt they had transformed the school site, making it unrecognisable from a set. The fictional school's motto was chosen by Phillips. She selected "Ex Nihlio Omnia", which translates from Latin to "Everything From Nothing". She thought it was reflective of both the series' plotline and the quick turnaround that the production team had to achieve. Phillips wanted the student uniforms to reflect the story of the school from the beginning to the end of the series. She worked with costume designer Sarah Ryan to portray the improvement in behaviour through the school uniform. At the start of the series, few pupils were wearing the correct uniform or in some cases, any uniform. However, by the final episode, all pupils were wearing the appropriate uniform, representing how the behaviour in school had improved.

== Broadcast and home media release ==
Eight hour-long episodes were commissioned for the series, which premiered in the United Kingdom on BBC One on 9 March 2006. Episodes were broadcast every Thursday on BBC One in the 20:00 time slot. The first series was also broadcast in the United States on BBC America. The series was promoted through a 20-second trailer. The series was released on DVD in the United Kingdom on 26 March 2007, published by 2entertain. The release includes all eight episodes on a three-disc set and was given a 12 certification under the British Board of Film Classification (BBFC). The boxset was released in Australia on 7 October 2010, and in the United States and Canada on 16 October 2012.

== Reception ==
At the 2006 TV Quick and TV Choice Awards, Waterloo Road won the award for Best New Drama. The ratings for the series averaged at 4.6 million viewers.

A reporter for the Daily Record praised the series, describing it as "enthralling", despite calling most stories miserable. They wrote, "School dramas aren't exactly a rarity, but every now and then one comes along which proves to be a real winner." Their colleague, Paul English, gave a poor review of the first three episodes of the series, calling it a "lame, patronising Jason Merrells drama". Comparing it to the Channel 4 sitcom Teachers which had a "surreal take" on education, he felt that Waterloo Road failed in opting to dramatise teaching. He opined that the series "aims to be all things to all people" and featured too many plotlines for varying audiences. English felt that the characters were unrealistic and boring, whilst the script was not subtle in its morality. However, he praised Welch's character and the series' soundtrack. Of the first series, another Daily Record reporter wrote, "Waterloo Road might be bottom of the league when it comes to academic achievement but, as the first series proved, it tops the tables when it comes to bullying, back-stabbing, and heavy-petting - and that's just among the teachers."

The show was criticised by headteachers and the Association of School and College Leaders (ASCL), who deemed the series an "irresponsible and inaccurate" representation of schools and school leadership. Scenes depicting teachers smoking in the playground were considered unrealisitic as such an act would lead to a suspension, whilst portrayals of "overtly sexual" pupils were lambasted for fears that it may encourage such behaviour from students. The portrayal of Andrew Treneman as "the heroic deputy head" was also criticised for promoting the idea that schools could be transformed in the span of a year. Speaking at the annual ASCL conference, Brian Lightman, a national executive member of the ASCL, requested that the government support a better representation of schools and the teaching profession. McManus told Peter Wilby of The Guardian that she had expected this criticism from teaching professionals.
