= Waterloo Road series 3 =

Waterloo Road
- Series 3
- DVD cover
- Starring: Jason Merrells; Eva Pope; Neil Morrissey; Jason Done; Philip Martin Brown; Christine Tremarco; Shabana Bakhsh; Chris Geere; Denise Welch; Jacqueline Kington; Kay Purcell; Craig Fitzpatrick
- No. of episodes: 20

Release
- Original network: BBC One
- Original release: 11 October 2007 – 13 March 2008

Series chronology
- ← Previous; Series 2 Next → Series 4

The third series of Waterloo Road, a British television school drama series created by Ann McManus and Maureen Chadwick and produced by BBC Scotland and Shed Productions, commenced airing in the United Kingdom on 11 October 2007 and concluded after 20 episodes on 13 March 2008.

Waterloo Road's third series aired in the United Kingdom on Thursdays at 8:00 pm GMT on BBC One, a terrestrial television network, where it received an average of five million viewers per episode.

== Plot ==
The show follows the lives of the teachers and the pupils at the eponymous school of Waterloo Road, a failing inner-city comprehensive, tackling a wide range of issues often seen as taboo such as death, running away from home, prostitution, child grooming, HIV/AIDS, child abuse, homosexuality, Asperger syndrome, deportation, activism, blackmail, plagiarism and assault.

=== Premise ===
This series opened with headteacher Jack Rimmer (Jason Merrells) recording an emotional message for the entire school to hear, following the death of his colleague Izzie Redpath (Jill Halfpenny). Jack was witness to Izzie's stabbing at the end of Series 2, but it was previously unknown if she had died or not.

Jack's second-in-command Andrew Treneman (Jamie Glover) was replaced by Eddie Lawson (Neil Morrissey), having accepted a teaching post in Rwanda alongside Kim Campbell (Angela Griffin) at the end of Series 2. Jack struggles to fulfil his role as headteacher this series, and later resigns when the school's board of governors find the school's budget has been misused. He is succeeded by Rachel Mason (Eva Pope), an ex-prostitute who used to be named Amanda Fenshaw.

One of the major plots this series is the marriage between two pupils, Chlo Grainger (Katie Griffiths) and Donte Charles (Adam Thomas). Being so young, everybody has their doubts. These doubts are confirmed when Donte finds Chlo sleeping with her sister Mika's (Lauren Drummond) boyfriend, Brett Aspinall (Tom Payne). When Mika tells her she never wants to see her again, Chlo runs away to Manchester, but this only causes more trouble for her and the Graingers, who are already struggling following the death of their mother. Chlo does return to Waterloo Road, but she and Donte's relationship may never be the same. While Mika does rekindle her relationship with Brett, and the pair begin to publicly fight for environmental rights. During this series, Donte also fathered a son, Ashton Stone, with Celine Dixon, revealed in series 15.

Another central character this series is Davina Shackleton (Christine Tremarco), who is accused of having a sexual relationship with pupil, Darren Brigg Jr (Lee Worswick), and who was then forced to date his father, Darren Brigg Sr (Sean Wilson), who started the accusation. Other storylines included the deportation of a pupil, a plagiarism scam in the school that catches the examination board's attention and English teacher Jasmine Koreshi (Shabana Bakhsh) being accused by new pupil Michaela White (Zaraah Abrahams) of assault.

The Series 3 finale saw a fire spread throughout the school. During the fire, Davina was rushed to hospital and headmistress Rachel and contractor, Stuart Hordley (who had both blackmailed Rachel and started the fire) were both trapped under the rubble. Pupil Chlo was trapped in the toilets, but was saved by English teacher Tom Clarkson (Jason Done) and former lover, Donte.

== Cast and characters ==
=== Staff ===
- Jason Merrells as Jack Rimmer; Headteacher (7 episodes)
- Eva Pope as Rachel Mason; Headteacher replacing Jack Rimmer (14 episodes)
- Neil Morrissey as Eddie Lawson; Deputy Headteacher and Maths teacher (20 episodes)
- Jason Done as Tom Clarkson; Head of Pastoral Care and English teacher (20 episodes)
- Philip Martin Brown as Grantly Budgen; Head of English (20 episodes)
- Christine Tremarco as Davina Shackleton; Teaching Assistant (19 episodes)
- Shabana Bakhsh as Jasmine Koreshi; English teacher (19 episodes)
- Chris Geere as Matt Wilding; Head of Music and Drama (18 episodes)
- Denise Welch as Steph Haydock; Head of French (18 episodes)
- Jacqueline Kington as Bridget Morley; School secretary (16 episodes)
- Kay Purcell as Candice Smilie; Senior Canteen Assistant (9 episodes)
- Craig Fitzpatrick as Lewis Seddon; Canteen Assistant (8 episodes)

=== Students ===
- Lauren Drummond as Mika Grainger (20 episodes)
- Katie Griffiths as Chlo Grainger (19 episodes)
- Tachia Newall as Bolton Smilie (19 episodes)
- Tom Payne as Brett Aspinall (17 episodes)
- Lauren Thomas as Aleesha Dillon (17 episodes)
- Lucy Dixon as Danielle Harker (17 episodes)
- Adam Thomas as Donte Charles (16 episodes)
- Chelsee Healey as Janeece Bryant (16 episodes)
- Ellie Paskell as Maxine Barlow (16 episodes)
- Jessica Baglow as Karla Bentham (11 episodes)
- Zeriozha Burtt-Skeete as Celine Dixon (9 episodes)
- Thomas Milner as Paul Langley (8 episodes)
- Zaraah Abrahams as Michaela White (4 episodes)

=== Others ===
==== Recurring ====
- Silas Carson as Stuart Hordley; Investor and Rachel's blackmailer (9 episodes)
- Chris Finch as Colin Scott; Matt's fiancé (5 episodes)
- Robert Angell as Nigel Hinchcliffe; Chair of Governors (4 episodes)
- Joel Goonan as Dominic Hammond; Student (4 episodes)
- Naveed Choudhry as Shahid Kapoor; Student (3 episodes)
- Maria Lennon as Ria Cheetham; School governor (3 episodes)
- Lorraine Cheshire as Fleur Budgen; Grantly's wife (2 episodes)
- James Rawlings as Wilson Bingham; Supply teacher (2 episodes)
- Fiona Wade as Sameen Azizi; Student (2 episodes)
- Sean Wilson as Darren Briggs, Sr.; Darren's father (2 episodes)
- Lee Worswick as Darren Briggs, Jr.; Student (2 episodes)

==== Guest ====
- Tara Berwin as Sally Froggart; Student (1 episode)
- Antony Edridge as Claude Legard; Investor (1 episode)
- Sally Ann Matthews as Alison Lawson; Eddie's ex-wife (1 episode)
- Steve Money as Clarence Charles; Donte's father (1 episode)
- James Varley as Ben McNulty; Student (1 episode)

== Production ==
Waterloo Road was recommissioned by Shed Productions alongside BBC Scotland for a third series consisting of 20 sixty-minute episodes. The series was set in Rochdale, England, with filming based in the same location and starting in 2007. Regularly, music was taken from the London based band Athlete and from their album Beyond the Neighbourhood. Due to copyright issues, some music is unavailable on the DVD release in all regions.

=== Casting ===
At the end of series two, a few cast members who had previously received main billing had departed. The third series featured several new cast members, alongside several more departures. Jason Merrells starred in the first six episodes of the third series, before leaving the show. To replace him on-screen in the role of Head of Waterloo Road, Eva Pope was cast as Rachel Mason, Waterloo Road's newest Head teacher with a past. Andrew Treneman, having played Deputy Head in the first two series, was replaced by Neil Morrissey who was cast in the role of Eddie Lawson. Other new members of staff this series included NQT teacher Jasmine Koreshi (Shabana Bakhsk) and the newly appointed openly gay Head of Music and Drama Matt Wilding (Chris Geere). Pupils introduced in the third series included popular girls Aleesha Dillon (played by Lauren Thomas) and Danielle Harker (played by Lucy Dixon), Karla Bentham (played by Jessica Baglow), who has Asperger syndrome, the troubled Paul Langley (played by Thomas Milner), Bolton Smilie (played by Tachia Newall) and loud and proud pupil Michaela White (played by Zaraah Abrahams).

== Episodes ==
No.	Title	Directed by	Written by	Original release date	UK viewers (million)
Autumn Term
21	"Episode 1"	Marc Jobst	Harriet Warner	11 October 2007	5.00
As the gates open for a new term at Waterloo Road, the school is firmly in the spotlight following the murder of drama teacher, Izzie Redpath. Although Jack has won a national bravery award, he secretly blames himself for Izzie's death. Meanwhile, Steph is relishing her new position as head of pastoral care, but disaster looms as a new pupil, Karla Bentham, who has Asperger syndrome, is placed in her less-than-capable hands. Utter chaos ensues when Grantly is on the receiving end of one of Karla's violent outbursts, leaving new Deputy Eddie Lawson to pick up the pieces. Elsewhere, Tom Clarkson faces fresh troubles when Chlo skips school to marry Donte. Note: First appearance of Eddie Lawson, Bridget Morley, Bolton and Candice Smile, Karla Bentham, Aleesha Dillon, Danielle Harker, Jasmine Koreshi, and Matt Wilding.
22	"Episode 2"	Marc Jobst	Lisa Holdsworth	18 October 2007	4.70
A fight club is in full swing at Waterloo Road, with Bolton Smilie and Paul Langley at the centre. Jasmine suspects Paul is being abused and raises her concerns with Steph. But her attentions are firmly on new music teacher, Matt Wilding. Jasmine shares her worries with Eddie and her suspicions are confirmed when he finds Paul following a beating. Eddie rounds up the usual suspects and gets the boys to confess. But an unstable Paul steals a knife from the kitchen and finally decides to stand up for himself. Meanwhile, Tom is worried that Chlo's new marriage could threaten her education, and asks Steph to give her extra French tuition. Chlo isn't happy with the idea, but is delighted when Brett offers to help. It's soon clear there is chemistry between the pair. Elsewhere, Auditions for the school musical are underway, giving Aleesha the opportunity to play a cruel trick on Karla. Note: First Appearance of Paul Langley.
23	"Episode 3"	Dermot Boyd	David McManus & Annie Bruce & James Simpson	25 October 2007	4.39
Today is Waterloo Road's first ever girls' football match and Tom is preparing the team to give it all they've got. Jasmine is having the day from hell. She can't control her class and loses it big style, throwing half the girls football team into detention and jeopardising the match. Meanwhile, the pressure is taking its toll on Jack. He's been grilled on budgets by school adviser Ria Cheetham, and continues his downward spiral concerning Izzy's death which has resulted in a bitter feud with Tom. To top it all, Davina is on a residential course. By the end of the day, he finds himself turning to Steph for comfort. Elsewhere, Donte goes flathunting for him and Chloe, whilst Chlo finally gives in to temptation with Brett.
24	"Episode 4"	Dermot Boyd	Matthew Evans	1 November 2007	5.11
Matt injures himself in an effort to help wounded pupil, Ben McNulty, and is surprised when the boy recoils in horror as he bandages him. The situation becomes more bizarre when the usually apathetic Steph, swoops in and anxiously rushes a terrified Ben to A&E. Meanwhile, Chlo is wracked with guilt after sleeping with Brett, and whilst Donte plans a romantic surprise for her, she cannot resist Brett's advances. But the events that follow have dire consequences for all three. Elsewhere, Jack proposes to Davina.
25	"Episode 5"	Luke Watson	Fleur Costello	8 November 2007	5.08
It's a day of heartbreak at Waterloo Road, Donte is on the warpath after finding Chlo and Brett in bed together. Unable to find Brett, Donte takes out his frustrations on Eddie's new car. News of Chlo and Brett spreads and Chlo is desperate to tell Mika before someone else does – but she's too late, and whilst Donte pays Brett a visit, Chlo makes a big decision about the future of them all. Meanwhile, Jack takes Davina out for lunch. He's determined to "do the right thing" and confess about his one-night stand with Steph, but loses his nerve. Unfortunately, a misunderstanding in the staff room takes matters out of his hands and Davina finds out.
26	"Episode 6"	Luke Watson	David McManus	15 November 2007	4.89
Jack is desperate to win Davina back. Although she clearly loves him, she is unable to forgive him for sleeping with Steph. Jack's day gets worse when Eddie discovers Jack's use for the Excellence in Cities' money. Ria Cheetham forces Jack to confess that he's manipulated the budget, and calls an emergency government meeting... Jack's future at Waterloo Road hangs in the balance. Meanwhile, The school is in the spotlight yet again with the disappearance of Chlo. Mika seems to have disowned her sister, but Donte, nursing a broken heart, steals Seddon's moped and goes to look for Chlo. And, Grantly is desperate to hide his money troubles for his wife. Note: Final appearance of Jack Rimmer (until episode 19).
27	"Episode 7"	Martin Hutchings	David McManus	22 November 2007	5.04
Waterloo Road is reeling after Jack's departure, apart from Eddie, who thinks he's the new acting Head. However, he's dealt a bitter blow in the shape of Rachel Mason, the newly appointed Head Teacher. It doesn't take long for them to be at loggerheads, the tension growing as she introduces her plans for a 'Business Enterprise College'. but when the scheme is a big hit with the pupils, Eddie views on Rachel take a different turn. Meanwhile, Chlo finds out the horror of how new flatmates Shaun and Lucy expect her to pay the rent following the failed shoplifting, she's to turn tricks. In a client's house, Chlo manages to call Tom, who with the police in tow, makes a mad dash over to save her, whilst back at school, Mika hits the bottle. Elsewhere, Grantly's gambling debt spirals out of control. Note: First appearance of Rachel Mason. Celine Dixon returns.
28	"Episode 8"	Marc Jobst	Lisa Holdsworth	29 November 2007	4.61
Eddie has organised a bad boys weekend to turn the lives of the most disruptive pupils around, and some of the staff are going on the trip. Rachel thinks the worst, and Tom is reluctant as he's only just got his family back, but he joins Eddie, Davina and Grantly. When Grantly insults Bolton's mum, the trip provides Bolton with an opportunity to wreak revenge, but he accidentally puts his own life in grave danger. Meanwhile, Sally Froggatt is juggling her schoolwork and looking after her little brother, Ben. Sally's mother, Denise, is in Spain. Unable to contact Ben's babysitter, Sally leaves for school. She decides to head home later, though, when she still can't reach the babysitter. When Sally is caught leaving school premises, Rachel sends her to the cooler. However, home alone, Ben has managed to find his way out of the house and into an abandoned freezer – Rachel's error has left a child in danger. And, Chlo is devastated when she realises just how much heartache she has caused for Mika, whilst Brett considers leaving Waterloo Road.
29	"Episode 9"	Laurence Moody	Ann McManus & Sharon Oakes	6 December 2007	4.84
The skeleton of a baby is unearthed during an archaeological dig on the school grounds. Soon enough, a police investigation gets underway, with Steph taking charge of the situation, until she discovers the identity of the mother is much closer to home, and the investigation also forces Eddie to confront a painful memory from his past. Meanwhile, Brett is left reeling when Mika tells him that she is pregnant. And, Donte accepts his relationship with Chlo is over and begins dating fellow pupil, Celine Dixon.
30	"Episode 10"	Laurence Moody	Liz Lake	13 December 2007	4.87
Matt's thrown into a panic when Rachel announces the school musical is to be performed earlier in the day for a VIP audience, without a proper rehearsal, and everyone's work looks set to be for nothing when a jealous Aleesha plots to sabotage the musical. Meanwhile, Fleur, Grantly's wife, finally learns the truth about their gambling debts and takes her own drastic course of action to repair things. Elsewhere, Eddie's in for a shock by the arrival of his ex-wife at the school, and the chemistry continues to heat up between Tom and Davina. Note: First appearance of Stuart Hordley. Final appearance of Lewis Seddon.
Spring Term
31	"Episode 11"	Jenny Ash	Lisa Holdsworth	10 January 2008	5.46
Bolton sees school as just a game. Rachel is convinced a trip to a prison could give him and his friends the scare they need. Bolton's well up for it – his jailbird dad's told him prison is a cushy number. His views of prison remain positive even when Matt is injured by a violent prisoner. but Bolton finds his whole world crashing down when he finds himself on the wrong side of the bars. Meanwhile, Eddie is frustrated that the teachers aren't taking their exam duties seriously. They think the kids aren't under any real pressure because the exams are in no way as difficult as when they were at school, so Eddie asks them to sit an exam themselves. And, Brett is trying to restore his relationship with Mika, and uses the school news letter as a way of reeling her in.
32	"Episode 12"	Jenny Ash	Danny McCahon	17 January 2008	4.95
Rachel is bemused when developer Stuart Hordley shows up and makes a plea to reinstate his bid to build Waterloo Road's training centre. Rachel wants rid of Stuart, but he quickly ingratiates himself – especially with Eddie. It's music to Eddie's ears when Stuart offers an office junior's job for the best candidate at the afternoon's interviews. Meanwhile, Darren Briggs Snr asks Davina out as a thank-you for helping his son. Davina's flattered, but she is still harbouring feelings for Tom. An angry Darren accuses Davina of touching his son and takes his complaint to Rachel, leaving Davina fearing for her career. Elsewhere, Candice is delighted that Bolton has finally turned a corner. Note: First appearance of Michaela White.
33	"Episode 13"	Mike Adams	Nick Hoare	24 January 2008	4.85
Rachel's anxious about which construction firm will win the bid for Waterloo Road's new training centre – she must back blackmailer Stuart Hordley's bid or her past will be revealed. Meanwhile, Janeece leaves her work experience at her dream job in a spectacular manner and gets a second chance in a care home with Maxine, where she surprises herself and others with unexpected talents, taking to resident Bessie, played by Rosemary Leach, and helpless dementia patients. And, At Tom's, the sexual tension overwhelms Tom and Davina who end up in bed together – and Mika catches them.
34	"Episode 14"	Mike Adams	Doug Watson	31 January 2008	4.93
When Jasmine intervenes in an altercation between bully Michaela White and a younger pupil, she has no idea the day will end in her suspension following assault allegations against her. Meanwhile, Love is in the air for Tom and Davina, and it seems the chemistry between Mika and Brett has returned. Elsewhere, Grantly is horrified when Rachel asks him to teach ballroom dancing to the pupils, and Bolton challenges him to break dancing.
35	"Episode 15"	Julie Edwards	Michael Jenner	7 February 2008	5.08
Matt's mother, Susan Wilding, suddenly announces she's on her way to visit and, in a panic, Matt quickly removes all traces of partner Colin from their flat. When the sixth formers are on work experience at Colin's company, Matt tells Colin that he wants him to move out for a few days since he's never told his parents about his sexuality. Maxine overhears and sends a text message back to the whole school, outing Matt as gay.
36	"Episode 16"	Julie Edwards	David McManus	14 February 2008	5.46
Grantly is even more curmudgeonly than usual when he's asked to supervise Waterloo Road's bad boys alongside minxy duo Aleesha Dillon and Danielle Harker to cater for the Governors' AGM lunch. Meanwhile, it's the last day for supply teacher Wilson Bingham with whom Janeece has fallen in love with. She informs her stunned friends they're together and won't need to keep their love secret anymore after this day. Janeece ignores her friends warnings and leaves for a hotel for their first time, while the teachers find it hard to reconcile their growing suspicions about a sexual predator in their midst with the popular and competent Wilson. The tension between Eddie and Rachel reaches breaking point
37	"Episode 17"	Laurence Moody	Gert Thomas	21 February 2008	4.85
Mika, frustrated by Tom ignoring her requests to go on an environmental protest, takes her eco-warrior plans with Brett to another level, on the building site of the new Training Centre. Their protest takes a dangerous turn when Mika's online-contacts, willing to do violence, show up to help.
38	"Episode 18"	Laurence Moody	Fleur Costello	28 February 2008	5.14
When immigration officers arrive at Waterloo Road, Rachel learns that Sameen Azizi's family are being held in a detention centre and are due to be deported to Iran later that day. Sameen has escaped the centre and hid at the school, after her mother begged her to flee and finish her education in England. With Aleesha and Danielle she barricades herself in the changing rooms. Sameen's not going without a fight.
39	"Episode 19"	Unknown	Danny McCahon	6 March 2008	5.24
Donte sees Davina getting into a swanky car and is shocked to see the driver is his old headteacher, Jack Rimmer. Jack, who has overcome his demons resulting from Izzie's death, is excited to have heard from Davina. He tells her about his new well-paid job as headteacher of an international school in Dubai, inviting her to accompany him, to which she declines. Steph's latest attempt at finding a sponsor for the school ends in near disaster. Note: Return and Final appearance of Jack Rimmer. (until Series 15)
40	"Episode 20"	Unknown	Lisa Holdsworth	13 March 2008	5.47
It's the final day of term at Waterloo Road, and the school is pitted against a rival school in the spelling bee championships and the girls football. Stuart Hordley, enraged at the loss of all his business, returns to the school determined to expose Rachel's past to the school. A member of the Waterloo Road exam board visits the school, as the plagiarism scandal instigated by Maxine Barlow comes to their attention. As he was the only member of staff who knew of the cheating, Grantly Budgen decides to meet the exam board head on, determined not to let anyone else find out about his actions. Tragedy is in store as Hordley throws a smouldering fag-end into the bins filled with paper. As they burst into flames it ignites a leaky gas canister, leading to a massive explosion and sending a fireball ripping through the school's canteen. Note: Final appearance of Brett Aspinall, Bridget Morley and Stuart Hordley. Final appearance of Mika Grainger (until Series 13). Final appearance of Celine Dixon (until Series 15).

== DVD release ==
Three different box sets of the third series were released. The first ten episodes were released on 2 March 2009, episodes 11–20 were released on 11 May 2009. All twenty episodes were later released together as a complete six-disc set on 24 May 2009. The set included special features titled: Autumn Term Scrap Book, Pupil Reports, Teacher Evaluation and a Spring Term Scrap Book. All box sets for the third series were released with a "12" British Board of Film Classification (BBFC) certificate (meaning it is unsuitable for viewing by those under the age of 12 years).
