= Waterloo Road series 4 =

Waterloo Road
- Series 4
- DVD cover
- Starring: Eva Pope; Neil Morrissey; Jason Done; Denise Welch; Shabana Bakhsh; Philip Martin Brown; Elaine Symons; Chris Geere; Christine Tremarco; Kay Purcell; Katy Carmichael; Angela Griffin; Elyes Gabel
- No. of episodes: 20

Release
- Original network: BBC One
- Original release: 7 January – 20 May 2009

Series chronology
- ← Previous; Series 3 Next → Series 5

The fourth series of Waterloo Road, a British television school drama series created by Ann McManus and Maureen Chadwick and produced by BBC Scotland and Shed Productions, commenced airing in the United Kingdom on 7 January 2009 and concluded after 20 episodes on 20 May 2009.

Waterloo Road's fourth series aired in the United Kingdom on Wednesdays at 20:00 GMT on BBC One, a terrestrial television network, where it received an average of 4.76 million viewers per episode.

== Plot ==
The show follows the lives of the teachers and the pupils at the eponymous school of Waterloo Road, a failing inner-city comprehensive, tackling a wide range of issues often seen as taboo such as steroid abuse, teenage pregnancy, childbirth, adoption, bigamy, gun violence, burn injury, homeschooling, virginity, Type 1 diabetes, breast augmentation, poverty, alcoholism and smuggling.

=== Premise ===
The fourth series picks up after the events of the third series finale, which involved a fire almost destroying the school and left the fate of several staff and pupils unknown.

The Kelly family are introduced as prominent characters this series, often referred to as the "family from hell". The family consists of alcoholic mother, Rose Kelly (Elaine Symons), and her five children, who all enrol at Waterloo Road and bring many problems with them. Later in the series, a major plot sees pupil Maxine Barlow (Ellie Paskell) led to tragedy after getting together with Earl Kelly (Reece Noi).

Other plots this series include new Head of PE Rob Cleaver (Elyes Gabel), who trains pupil Bolton Smilie (Tachia Newall) using pills that give him an unfair advantage and more of headteacher Rachel Mason's (Eva Pope) secrets being exposed following the arrival of her sister, Melissa Ryan (Katy Carmichael) as well as her nephew, Phillip (Dean Smith). Also, troubled pupil Chlo Grainger (Katie Griffiths) giving birth and, finally, the return of former Head of Pastoral Care Kim Campbell (Angela Griffin), who smuggles a baby girl into the country on her return from Rwanda.

== Cast and characters ==
=== Staff ===
- Eva Pope as Rachel Mason; Headteacher (19 episodes)
- Neil Morrissey as Eddie Lawson; Deputy Headteacher and Maths teacher (20 episodes)
- Jason Done as Tom Clarkson; Head of Pastoral Care and English teacher (20 episodes)
- Denise Welch as Steph Haydock; Head of French (19 episodes)
- Shabana Bakhsh as Jasmine Koreshi; Deputy Head of English (19 episodes)
- Philip Martin Brown as Grantly Budgen; Head of English (18 episodes)
- Elaine Symons as Rose Kelly; Canteen Assistant (18 episodes)
- Chris Geere as Matt Wilding; Head of Music and Drama (17 episodes)
- Christine Tremarco as Davina Shackleton; Teaching Assistant (13 episodes)
- Kay Purcell as Candice Smilie; Senior Canteen Assistant (13 episodes)
- Katy Carmichael as Melissa Ryan; Head of Extended Services (11 episodes)
- Angela Griffin as Kim Campbell; Head of Pastoral Care and Art teacher (10 episodes)
- Elyes Gabel as Rob Cleaver; Head of Physical Education (10 episodes)

=== Students ===
- Chelsee Healey as Janeece Bryant (20 episodes)
- Zaraah Abrahams as Michaela White (20 episodes)
- Luke Bailey as Marley Kelly (20 episodes)
- Katie Griffiths as Chlo Grainger (19 episodes)
- Holly Kenny as Sambuca Kelly (19 episodes)
- Tachia Newall as Bolton Smilie (19 episodes)
- Sadie Pickering as Flick Mellor (19 episodes)
- Thomas Milner as Paul Langley (18 episodes)
- Adam Thomas as Donte Charles (18 episodes)
- Lucy Dixon as Danielle Harker (17 episodes)
- Lauren Thomas as Aleesha Dillon (17 episodes)
- Dean Smith as Philip Ryan (16 episodes)
- Jessica Baglow as Karla Bentham (14 episodes)
- Reece Douglas as Denzil Kelly (13 episodes)
- Darcy Isa as Lauren Andrews (9 episodes)
- Reece Noi as Earl Kelly (8 episodes)
- Ellie Paskell as Maxine Barlow (8 episodes)

=== Others ===
==== Recurring ====
- Malcolm Scates as Ralph Mellor; Chair of Governors and Flick's father (7 episodes)
- Tim Healy as Dave Miller; Head of Security (5 episodes)
- Lorraine Cheshire as Fleur Budgen; Grantly's wife (3 episodes)
- Alan McKenna as Mr. Parker; Deportation officer (3 episodes)
- Jamie Glover as Andrew Treneman; Former Deputy Headteacher (2 episodes)
- Steve Money as Clarence Charles; Donte's father (2 episodes)
- Caroline O'Neill as Mrs. Bryant; Janeece's mother (2 episodes)

==== Guest ====
- Rachael Cairns as Tasha Lefton; Student (1 episode)
- Naveed Choudhry as Shahid Kapoor; Student (1 episode)
- Daniela Denby-Ashe as Jem Allen; Supply teacher (1 episode)
- Elize du Toit as Heather; Presenter of the North West Schools Choir competition (1 episode)
- Joe Duttine as Andy Harker; Danielle's father (1 episode)
- Sheraiah Larcher as Maaka Lacey; Supply teacher (1 episode)
- Conrad Nelson as Bill Willis; Songwriter and poet (1 episode)
- Rupert Procter as Mr. Peters; Kyle's father (1 episode)
- Jack Rigby as Kyle Peters; Student (1 episode)
- Natalie J. Robb as Charlotte Monk; School counsellor (1 episode)
- Colin Tierney as Reynold Kelly; Rose's ex-husband and Sambuca's father (1 episode)
- Tom Turner as Gregory; Head of Music and Drama at Forest Mount (1 episode)

== Episodes ==
No.	Title	Directed by	Written by	Original release date	UK viewers (million)
Autumn Term
41	"Episode 1"	Minkie Spiro	Lisa Holdsworth	7 January 2009	4.69
Following the fire that nearly destroyed the school, Rachel is keen to start the new term with a clean slate and no more mistakes. New pupil Earl Kelly, however, ensures that Waterloo Road experiences one of the worst days in its history. Meanwhile, new PE teacher Rob Cleaver makes a big impression on Jasmine, Steph and Matt, whilst Grantly returns to school with a new look. Elsewhere, Love is in the air between Donte and Chlo and Davina and Tom. First Appearance of Rob Cleaver, Rose, Marley, Earl, Sambuca, Denzil and Prince Kelly, Ralph and Flick Mellor and Melissa Ryan.
42	"Episode 2"	Minkie Spiro	David McManus	14 January 2009	4.85
Rachel's sister Melissa Ryan risks getting them both fired when she loses control of her adult education class. Eddie is furious when he discovers that Rachel has gone behind his back. As the sparks fly between him and Melissa he has to assess how he really feels. Meanwhile, the new security guard Dave Miller is taking his job seriously, until he develops a serious crush on Steph Haydock. Steph finds herself inundated with gifts, and it's clear she's going to have to let Security Dave down gently. Note: First Appearance of Dave Miller and Phillip Ryan.
43	"Episode 3"	James Erskine	David McManus	21 January 2009	N/A (<4.65) (Note: Not reported in the weekly top 30 programmes for BBC One.)
Davina's reputation at Waterloo Road is at stake when she is accused of racism by a Maori supply teacher. Meanwhile, an ill-thought out lie from Steph looks like it might just spell the end for Grantly's marriage...
44	"Episode 4"	James Erskine	Phillip Dodds	28 January 2009	N/A (<4.78)
Romance abounds as Melissa's speed dating event brings some unlikely couples together. Meanwhile, Tom's feud with the Kelly's intensifies when he becomes convinced that Earl is leaving dead birds on his doorstop. Trying to ease the situation, Eddie organises a falconry day at the school, but when one of the birds goes missing, there only seems to be one explanation...
45	"Episode 5"	Dominic Keavey	Ann McManus & Avril Russell	4 February 2009	N/A (<5.16)
Melissa has organised a Drugs Awareness Initiative for the school, with voluntary drugs tests for the senior year pupils. However, school Governor Ralph Mellor has his own agenda and plans to use the tests to get Marley Kelly kicked out of the school and away from his daughter, Flick Mellor, even if it means tampering with the results.
46	"Episode 6"	Dominic Keavey	Louise Ironside	11 February 2009	4.85
Matt has applied to be an emergency foster carer but may be biting off more than he can chew with his first ward – Sambuca Kelly. Meanwhile, Donte has organized an underground boxing match between Bolton Smilie and another pupil from a rival school. With Donte's debts spiraling out of control, the boxing match is a quick win to earn some cash. Note: First appearance of Lauren Andrews. Final appearance of Dave Miller
47	"Episode 7"	Matthew Evans	Phillip Dodds & Karen McLachlan	18 February 2009	N/A (<4.58)
Rachel is horrified when Eddie's relationship with her sister Melissa takes a dramatic leap forward, but Philip seems to be hiding a secret that threatens everyone's plans. Meanwhile, a loved-up Eddie must keep his mind on the job, but his day gets hijacked by an argument between Danielle and her father. What starts off as a debate about home-schooling versus state education soon escalates into a domestic dispute.
48	"Episode 8"	Matthew Evans	Nick Hoare	25 February 2009	4.85
Earl's doing his best to convince Maxine that they should have a baby. He wants them to finally have what they never got from their own childhoods; a proper family, a home and stability. This horrifies Steph, but Maxine's will becomes stronger and more resolute – no one understands Earl like her. However, the arrival of a mystery girl looking for Earl has Maxine questioning if she really knows him at all. The furious confrontation that follows triggers a chain of events that leads to tragedy. Note: Final appearance of Maxine Barlow and Earl Kelly.
49	"Episode 9"	Jonathan Fox Bassett	Michael Jenner	4 March 2009	4.81
The school is still reeling following the murder of Maxine Barlow. Rachel feels responsible – the buck stops with her. She plans to resign with immediate effect. However, the shock revelation from Paul that the gun in the school at the start of term was Earl's compels her to try and secure Denzil Kelly's release before she goes. Elsewhere, realising that life is precious, Donte surprises Chlo with a romantic proposition and Eddie organises a surprise for Melissa. He's organised a beach wedding in a tropical paradise – and they leave the following week. Note: Denzil Kelly returns as a regular character
50	"Episode 10"	Jonathan Fox Bassett	David McManus	11 March 2009	4.44
It's the last day of term at Waterloo Road and everyone is excited about Bolton's boxing final. Rob Cleaver is adamant that Bolton's about to be Rochdale's next Rocky and a loved up Jasmine is bursting with pride for her man. However, Bolton's nerves are getting to him and so Rob offers him some help – a bottle of 'legal' pills. It's also the day Eddie and Melissa are due to fly out to Barbados to get married, but things don't quite go to plan and both Rachel and Eddie are left reeling when the truth finally comes out. Final appearance of Rob Cleaver. Final appearance of Melissa Ryan (until Episode 20).
Spring Term
51	"Episode 11"	Tim Hopewell	Lisa Holdsworth	18 March 2009	4.92
It's an exciting day at Waterloo Road as Kim Campbell returns from Rwanda to resume her role as Head of Pastoral Care. Popular with staff and students alike, Kim raises a few eyebrows when she turns up with a baby in tow, but no Andrew Treneman. Kim can't wait to get stuck into work, but the planned careers day, involving former pupils of Waterloo Road, is thrown into chaos with the arrival of Jordan-esque glamour model, Sarah-Leanne. Kim finds herself battling with Sarah-Leanne to win the hearts and minds of her celebrity-obsessed students. Note: Kim Campbell returns. First appearance of Grace Campbell
52	"Episode 12"	Tim Hopewell	Nazrin Choudhry	25 March 2009	4.95
Kim's day starts badly when the uncle of her baby, Grace, shows up at the school threatening to expose a secret about his niece. Kim struggles to keep her personal life from impacting on her job as she tries to get rid of him. Desperate, she turns to Steph, who is immediately suspicious. With Kim's eye off the ball, Karla Bentham becomes the victim of Michaela White's scheme to make money, and another type of bullying. It's a race against time for Kim to recover Karla before her own situation is exposed.
53	"Episode 13"	Jon Sen	Marc Pye	1 April 2009	4.86
With Rachel on a course, Eddie's at the helm but soon finds out it's not going to be an easy ride – a community of travellers have pitched up next to the school and the kids are to be enrolled at Waterloo Road. Tensions soon mount between the pupils and the travellers. Eddie thinks he has the answer and arranges a football match, but things soon get dirty on the pitch and the simmering tensions of the day bubble over. Before he knows it, Eddie has a riot on his hands.
54	"Episode 14"	Jon Sen	Phillip Dodds	8 April 2009	4.51
Matt's choir are practicing hard, now that Rachel wants a performance that evening. Matt is left deflated when it transpires most of the members were blackmailed to attend and the race is on to re-group and recruit willing members in time for their showcase. Meanwhile, a stack of STI leaflets that Kim has been distributing to her sex education class fall into the wrong hands. Kim is dragged before Rachel and Eddie to explain but she's too consumed with worry as she's found out the Home Office has hired a private investigator to track her and Grace.
55	"Episode 15"	James Erskine	David McManus	15 April 2009	4.60
Determined to reunite the girls' football team, Tom persuades his old friend Captain Andy Rigby to run an army day at the school, using team building techniques to whip the girls into shape. However, the day descends into a shambolic mess when one pupil sees the opportunity for a personal act of revenge. Elsewhere, Davina is delighted to finally qualify as a teacher, and things seem perfect when Rachel offers her a job at Waterloo Road, but her day starts to unravel when she discovers that money has gone missing from her and Tom's joint account. Note: Final appearance of Davina Shackleton.
56	"Episode 16"	James Erskine	Nick Hoare	22 April 2009	4.93
Waterloo Road's latest supply teacher, Jem Allen, is proving popular with staff and students alike but her upbeat attitude and glamorous lifestyle are enough to get right up Grantly's nose. Forced together on a school trip, their antagonism builds to a life-threatening climax. Back at school with the exams in full swing, Chlo realises how much the future she wants will be restricted by motherhood. She is forced to make the hardest decision of her life, with devastating consequences for Donte.
57	"Episode 17"	Julie Edwards	Louise Ironside	29 April 2009	4.62
Steph's return to Waterloo Road starts badly when a pupil leads a class revolt and Rachel blames the problem on her poor teaching skills. The day takes a dramatic turn when Steph discovers the same pupil in a life-threatening situation. Meanwhile Donte is struggling with Chlo's decision to put their baby up for adoption so that she can pursue her dream of going to university. A concerned Kim mediates. She urges Chlo to involve Donte and ask Tom for advice, but Chlo seems determined to proceed no matter what.
58	"Episode 18"	Julie Edwards	Michael Jenner	6 May 2009	4.76
Bitter battle lines are drawn between Chlo and Donte as they wrangle over their baby's future, but when Chlo goes into a complicated premature labour, Donte finds himself at risk of losing his baby and his wife. Meanwhile, a Home Office official turns up at the school to tell a shocked Eddie and Rachel that Kim has taken Grace from Rwanda against her father's wishes. The officials paint her as little more than a criminal who paid another woman for her baby. What follows sees Kim's world come crashing down around her. Note: Final appearance of Grace Campbell
59	"Episode 19"	Keith Boak	David McManus	13 May 2009	4.54
Still reeling from losing Grace, Kim struggles to hold it together as organiser of a fundraising day at the school, while her ex Andrew Treneman pays a surprise visit to the school. Meanwhile Rose Kelly and Candice Smilie prepare a menu for the relief day using their knock-off meat. It's past its sell-by-date but they've given it a once-over and taken off the labels so that no-one is any the wiser. However, when a mystery illness strikes the school, the dodgy dealings in the canteen come under suspicion. Meanwhile, despite Marley returning the money Ralph bribed him before, Ralph goes too far with Marley, by giving him a surprise smash on the way to school. Note: Andrew Treneman returns.
60	"Episode 20"	Keith Boak	Lisa Holdsworth	20 May 2009	4.94
In the season finale, Waterloo Road is in the final of North West Schools Choir of the Year competition, but things take a bad turn when it becomes apparent that Flick stole the lyrics for the song. Rachel decides to save the reputation of the school and withdraws them from the competition, to the dismay of Matt. Back at the school, Ralph turns up drunk at the empty Waterloo Road, and goes on a rampage with a digger before Eddie puts a stop to it. Kim and Andrew reconcile and Chlo and Donte move into a flat in Manchester, while Melissa returns revealing she is pregnant with Eddie's baby, to his shock. Note: Final appearance of Andrew Treneman (until Series 12), Jasmine Koreshi, Eddie Lawson, Marley Kelly, Ralph and Flick Mellor, and Melissa Ryan. Janeece Bryant (until Series 6), Matt Wilding (until Series 7), Donte Charles and Chlo Grainger (both until Series 11).

== DVD release ==
Three different box sets of the fourth series was released. The first ten episodes of the series were released on 21 September 2009, and the back ten episodes were released on 26 April 2010. All twenty episodes were later released together on 18 October 2010. They were released with a "12" British Board of Film Classification (BBFC) certificate.
