= Waterloo Road (TV series) =

British television drama series (2006–2015; 2023–present)

- Title card (2023–present)
- Genre: Drama
- Created by: Ann McManus; Maureen Chadwick
- Starring: Full cast
- Country of origin: United Kingdom
- Original language: English
- No. of series: 17
- No. of episodes: 254 (list of episodes)

Production
- Executive producers: Various
- Production locations: Greater Manchester, England (series 1–7, 11–present); Greenock, Scotland (series 8–10)
- Running time: 56–87 minutes
- Production companies: Shed Productions (series 1–10); BBC Scotland (series 8–10); Wall to Wall (series 11–present); Rope Ladder Fiction (series 11–present)

Original release
- Network: BBC One (2006–2014, 2023–present); BBC Three (2015); BBC iPlayer (2023–present)
- Release: 9 March 2006 – 9 March 2015
- Release: 3 January 2023 – present

Related
- Waterloo Road Reunited

Waterloo Road is a British television drama series set in a comprehensive school of the same name, first broadcast on BBC One on 9 March 2006, and concluding its original run on 9 March 2015.

In September 2021, the show was recommissioned, with production returning to the Greater Manchester area.

== Premise ==
Waterloo Road is set in a failing comprehensive school, and later academy of the same name and focuses on the professional and personal lives of the students and staff.

Ann McManus, the show's cocreator, devised the series in response to the BBC requesting a drama pertinent to "ordinary people in Britain today". She used the programme to explore many topical issues that occur within Britain, applying them to an educational setting.

== Production ==
=== Development ===
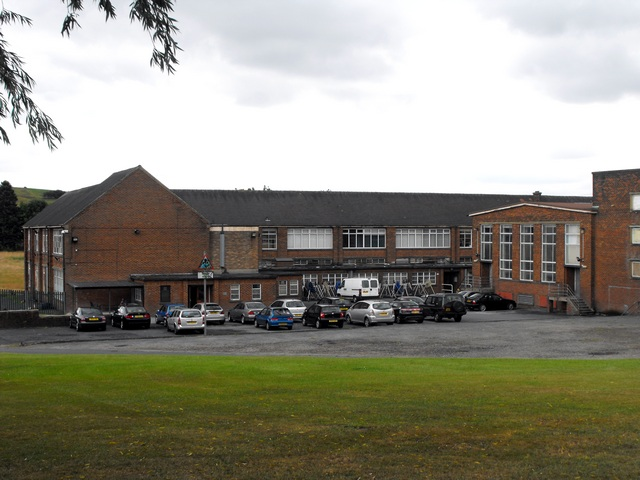
From Series 1 to Series 7, the original setting for the series was the former Hill Top Community Primary School in Kirkholt, Rochdale

The first series of Waterloo Road contained eight episodes and was first broadcast from 9 March to 27 April 2006 on BBC One. The show was renewed for a second series that was twelve episodes long, airing from 18 January to 26 April 2007. Series 3 to 6 each contained twenty episodes. The third series aired between 11 October 2007 and 13 March 2008, and the fourth series between 7 January and 20 May 2009. Series 5 was the first to be recorded in HD, and began airing on Wednesday 28 October 2009 (the previous Sunday for BBC One Scotland). The final episode aired on 15 July 2010.

The show was filmed and set in the English town of Rochdale from the first series until the end of seventh series, and the Scottish town of Greenock from the beginning of eighth series until the end of its original run, the tenth series. The first episode was broadcast on BBC One on 9 March 2006, and the final episode of the original run was broadcast on BBC Three on 9 March 2015.

Production was meant to move locations in 2009, with storylines in the fourth and fifth series designed to coincide with that move. However, these plans did not go ahead, so the show remained in its original location until series 7. The filming of the fifth and sixth series was back-to-back, from 2009 to 2010. The sixth series ran from 1 September 2010 to 6 April 2011. The seventh series began airing on 4 May 2011 and ended on 25 April 2012. The series lasted for 30 episodes.

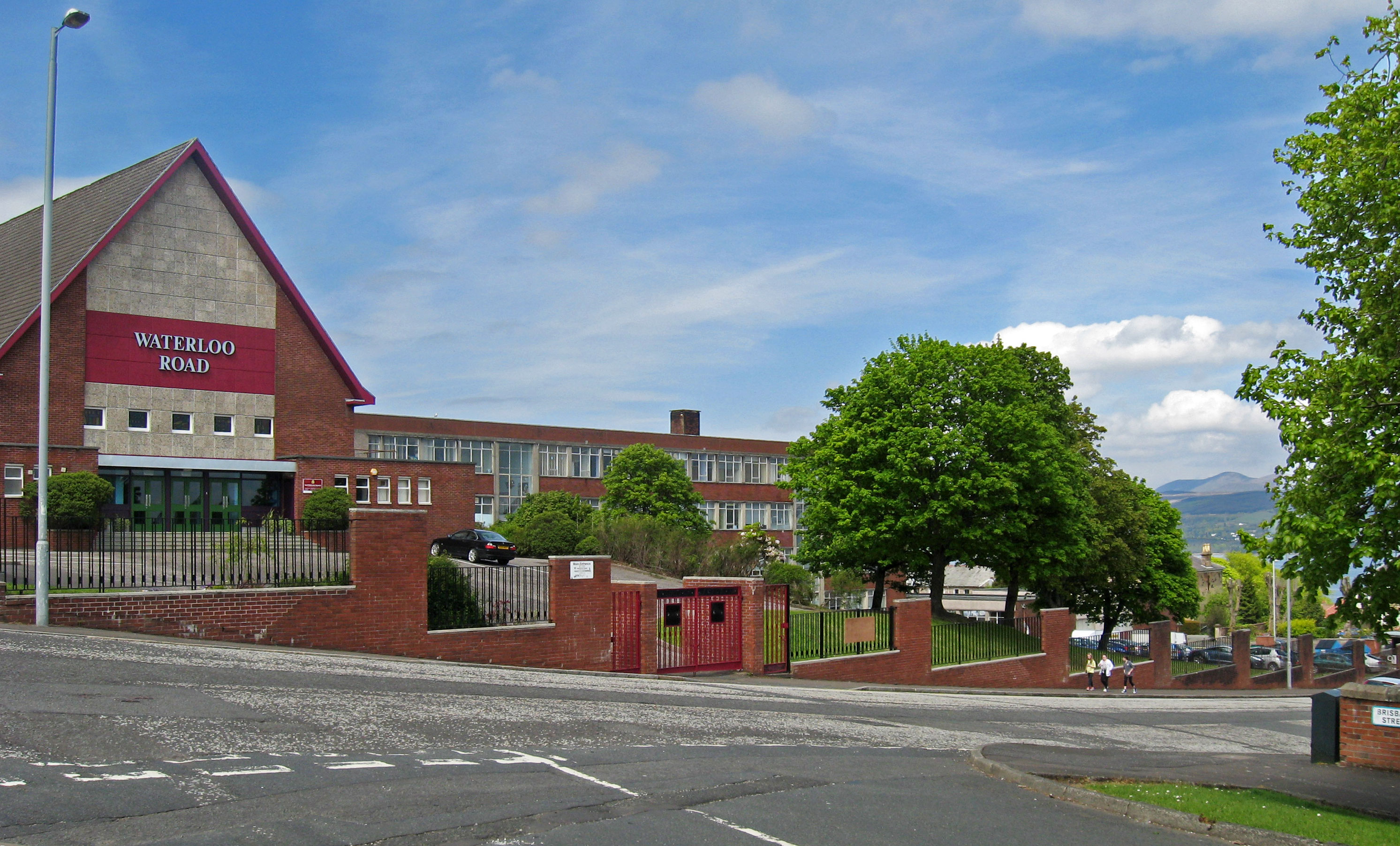
From Series 8 to Series 10, the setting was the former Greenock Academy, on Madeira Street, Greenock.

In August 2011, it was announced that production would relocate to Greenock, Scotland. This was part of the BBC's efforts to increase network programming from Scotland, with filming to begin from April 2012. As part of the production move, 50 episodes were commissioned, which later formed the eighth and ninth series. For most of the eighth series, the school was a non-fee charging independent school, as opposed to a comprehensive school as it was for the first seven series. The eighth series, again 30 episodes long, started on 23 August 2012 and concluded on 4 July 2013. Starting on 5 September the same year, the ninth series ran until 12 March 2014. The Rochdale site was demolished in 2013 and is now a housing estate.

On 2 April 2014, the BBC announced that series 10 would be the show's last. The final scenes were recorded on 22 August 2014, and the series premiered on 15 October. On 11 December, it was announced that the last ten episodes of the show would be aired first on BBC Three, with a repeat on BBC One later in the evening, losing the peak slot on BBC One which the show held since its launch in 2006. The final episode was the show's 200th and aired on 9 March 2015, exactly nine years after the first episode. In the story, the school remains open following a lengthy battle against a school merger. In September 2019, the entire series was made available on BBC iPlayer.

==== Revival ====
From Series 11 to Series 13, the setting was the former St Ambrose Barlow Roman Catholic High School, in Swinton, Salford.

On 23 September 2021, the BBC announced that it had commissioned 22 new episodes with Waterloo Road returning to BBC One. The series' production returned to Greater Manchester, with the school set being at the former St Ambrose Barlow Roman Catholic High School in Swinton. Filming commenced in February 2022, and the eleventh series of 7 episodes aired between 3 January and 14 February 2023. Series 12, containing seven more episodes aired on BBC one between 16 May and 27 June 2023. Series 13 was confirmed by a trailer attached to the final episode of series 12. On 21 August 2023 it was announced by the BBC that series 14 and 15 had been commissioned, with the three forthcoming series to contain eight episodes each. Filming for series 14 commenced in autumn 2023 with the new Greater Manchester Academy setting for Waterloo Road filmed in a former Manchester College campus. From September 2025, after the former Manchester College campus was sold to Manchester City Council and scheduled to reopen as a school, filming will move to a new site at Trafford Park, having signed a flexible 5 year lease for the former offices owned by Frasers Group.

In August 2024, the BBC announced that the show had been recommissioned for series 16 and 17, with the show's future secured until 2026. It was also confirmed that Series 14 would premiere in September 2024, and Series 15 would premiere in early 2025. Filming for series 16 and series 17 commenced in Summer 2024. Series 16 started on 23 September 2025. Series 17 started airing on 6 January 2026. In August 2025, the BBC announced that the show had been recommissioned for series 18 and 19, with filming set to commence later in the year.

=== Cast ===
The show utilises an ensemble cast led by the school's staff members. The longest-running cast members were Philip Martin Brown (Grantly Budgen, series 1–9), Jason Done (Tom Clarkson, series 1–8) and Chelsee Healey (Janeece Bryant, series 1–4 and 6–8, 11).

The original teaching characters consisted of Headteacher Jack Rimmer (Jason Merrells); Deputy Headteacher Andrew Treneman (Jamie Glover); Art teacher and Head of Pastoral Care Kim Campbell (Angela Griffin); Head of English Grantly Budgen (Philip Martin Brown); English teachers Lorna Dickey (Camilla Power) and Tom Clarkson (Jason Done); Head of French Steph Haydock (Denise Welch); and Head of Drama Izzie Redpath (Jill Halfpenny). The student characters included Donte Charles (Adam Thomas), Chlo Grainger (Katie Griffiths), Janeece Bryant (Chelsee Healey), Yasmin Deardon (Rhea Bailey), Mika Grainger (Lauren Drummond) and Lewis Seddon (Craig Fitzpatrick).

Series 2 introduced pupil Brett Aspinall (Tom Payne), his father and sponsor governor Roger Aspinall (Nick Sidi) and school secretary Davina Shackleton (Christine Tremarco). Other new pupils included Leigh-Ann Galloway (Holly Matthews).

Series 3 introduced new deputy head Eddie Lawson (Neil Morrissey) and, in the seventh episode, new Headteacher Rachel Mason (Eva Pope). Other staff arrivals include NQT English teacher Jasmine Koreshi (Shabana Bakhsh) and Head of Music and Drama Matt Wilding (Chris Geere). Pupils introduced in the third series include Aleesha Dillon (Lauren Thomas), Danielle Harker (Lucy Dixon), Karla Bentham (Jessica Baglow), Paul Langley (Thomas Milner), Bolton Smilie (Tachia Newall) and Michaela White (Zaraah Abrahams).

Series 4 introduced the Kelly family, consisting of mother Rose Kelly (Elaine Symons) and her five children: Marley (Luke Bailey), Earl (Reece Noi), Sambuca (Holly Kenny), Denzil (Reece Douglas), and baby Prince. The series features new Head of PE Rob Cleaver (Elyes Gabel), who is sacked when it transpires he is giving Bolton pills to help him win an important match. Rachel's sister Melissa Ryan (Katy Carmichael) and nephew Philip (Dean Smith) are also introduced.

Series 5 introduced Executive Head Max Tyler (Tom Chambers), Deputy Headteacher Christopher Mead (William Ash), Head of Food Technology Ruby Fry (Elizabeth Berrington), newly-qualified English teacher Helen Hopewell (Vinette Robinson) and Head of Modern Languages Jo Lipsett (Sarah-Jane Potts). New students included Emily James (Shannon Flynn) and her sister Lindsay James (Jenna-Louise Coleman), Siobhan Mailey (Phoebe Dynevor), Ros McCain (Sophie McShera), Luke Pendle (Richie Jeeves), Amy Porter (Ayesha Gwilt), Josh Stevenson (William Rush) and Finn Sharkey (Jack McMullen).

Series 6 introduced new Headteacher Karen Fisher (Amanda Burton). Karen's family included children Jess (Linzey Cocker) and Harry (Ceallach Spellman) and her husband and supply teacher Charlie (Ian Puleston-Davies). Lucien Laviscount was cast as rebellious teenager Jonah Kirby and Chelsee Healey also reprised her role as Janeece Bryant as the new school secretary. On 21 December 2009, the arrival of new pupils Bex Fisher (Tina O'Brien) and Kyle Stack (George Sampson) was announced; Kyle joined in episode 11. Also introduced in episode 11 were students Nate Gurney (Scott Haining), Ronan Burley (Ben-Ryan Davies), Ruth Kirby (Anna Jobarteh). Other additions included Ronan Burley's father (Martin Kemp), Head of Spanish Francesca "Cesca" Monotya (Karen David), Head of Pastoral Care Adanna Lawal (Sharlene Whyte) and Geography teacher and father of Jonah and Ruth, Marcus Kirby (Wil Johnson).

Series 7 introduced new Headteacher Michael Byrne (Alec Newman), science teacher and Deputy Headteacher Sian Diamond (Jaye Jacobs), school site manager Rob Scotcher (Robson Green), maths teacher Daniel Chalk (Mark Benton), new Head of English Linda Radleigh (Sarah Hadland), school canteen worker Maggie Croft (Melanie Hill), school benefactor Lorraine Donnagan (Daniela Denby-Ashe) and pupil Jodie "Scout" Allen (Katie McGlynn). Guest stars in the seventh series included: Gemma Atkinson, Dominique Jackson, Alicya Eyo, Margi Clarke, Jodie Prenger, Lisa Riley, Tupele Dorgu, Tracy-Ann Oberman, Kai Owen and Jane Asher.

Series 8 marked the start of Waterloo Road in Greenock, and introduced English teacher Christine Mulgrew (Laurie Brett), History teacher Audrey McFall (Georgie Glen), Languages teacher George Windsor (Angus Deayton), Deputy Headteacher Simon Lowsley (Richard Mylan), and a new School secretary Sonya Donnegan (Victoria Bush).

Series 9 introduced new science teacher Sue Spark (Vanessa Hehir), and new PE teacher Hector Reid (Leon Ockenden).

Series 10 introduced an extensive set of new characters, including new headmaster Vaughan Fitzgerald (Neil Pearson), his partner and Art teacher Allie Westbrook (Nicola Stephenson), his ex-wife and Geography teacher Olga Fitzgerald (Pooky Quesnel), and Olga and Vaughan's children Justin Fitzgerald (Max Bowden) and Leo Fitzgerald (Zebb Dempster). Other new staff introductions included Deputy Headteacher Lorna Hutchinson (Laura Aikman), GPD Teacher Guy Braxton (Regé-Jean Page), Science teacher Marco D'Olivera (Stefano Braschi). New pupils Kenzie Calhoun (Charlotte Beaumont), Scott Fairchild (Andrew Still), Carrie Norton (Tahirah Sharif), Bonnie Kincaid (Holly Jack), Dale Jackson (Finlay MacMillan) and Abdul Bukhari (Armin Karima), alongside existing pupils Rhiannon Salt (Rebecca Craven), Lenny Brown (Joe Slater), Lisa Brown (Caitlin Gillespie) and Darren Hughes (Mark Beswick).

Adam Thomas, Katie Griffiths and Angela Griffin reprised their roles in series 11 as Donte Charles, Chlo Charles and Kim Campbell respectively, with Campbell now as the Headteacher. Staff members included Lindon King (Vincent Jerome), Joe Casey (James Baxter), Wendy Whitwell (Jo Coffey), Valerie Chambers (Shauna Shim), Neil Guthrie (Neil Fitzmaurice), Coral Walker (Rachel Leskovac), Amy Spratt (Katherine Pearce), Nicky Walters (Kym Marsh), Jamilah Omar (Sonia Ibrahim) and Mike Rutherford (Ryan Clayton). New senior pupils included Danny Lewis (Adam Abbou), Samia Choudhry (Priyasasha Kumari), Preston Walters (Noah Valentine), Kai Sharif (Adam Ali), Kelly Jo Rafferty (Alicia Forde), Dean Weever (Francesco Piacentini-Smith), Noel McManus (Liam Scholes), and Caz Williams (Lucy Eleanor Begg). Junior pupils included Izzy Charles (Scarlett Thomas), Tonya Walters (Summer Violet Bird), Verity King (Ava Flannery), Dwayne Jackson (Thapelo Ray), Zayne Jackson (Inathi Rozani), Shola Aku (Chiamaka (ChiChi) Ulebor) and Norrulah Ashimi (Sahil Ismailkhil).

Series 13 introduced new students Libby Guthrie (Hattie Dynevor), Schumacher 'Schuey' Weever (Zak Sutcliffe), Stacey 'Stace' Neville (Tillie Amartey), Portia Weever (Maisie Robinson), Molly 'Mog' Richardson (Aabay Noor Ali), Jess Clarke (Zanele Nyoni), and Declan Harding (Teddy Wallwork).

Series 14 introduced Jason Manford as Steve Savage, Waterloo Road's new Headteacher, and Saira Choudhry as Nisha Chandra, Head of Maths. New students included Billy Savage (Olly Rhodes), Boz Osbourne (Nathan Wood), Aleena Qureshi (Sonya Nisa), Lois Taylor-Brown (Miya Ocego), Luca Smith (Danny Murphy), and Jared Jones (Matthew Khan).

Series 15 introduced Lindsey Coulson as Dame Stella Drake, the new Headteacher of Waterloo Road, and Lauren Patel as new early career teacher Jas Sharma. New students included Agnes Eccleston (Niamh Blackshaw), Cat Guthrie (Lucy Chambers), and Ashton Stone (Cory McClane).

Series 16 introduced Jon Richardson as Darius Donovan, a new media studies teacher at Waterloo Road. Christopher Jeffers also joined the cast as Mitch Swift, the new special educational needs coordinator at Waterloo Road. New students included Ben Drake (Fintan Buckard) and Hope Drake (Savannah Kunyo). The series also reintroduces Jason Merrells as a series regular, having appeared in a guest stint in the previous series.

Series 17 introduced new pupils Freddie Hollister (Freddy Smith), Leoni Tennant (Olivia Booth-Ford), Aisha Azzi (Myra-Sofia Iftikhar), Badr Azzi (Sana Ali), and Harleen Lamba (Isha Kaur). The series also reintroduces Denise Welch as a series regular, having previously appeared between the first and sixth series.

== Spin-offs ==
=== Waterloo Road Reunited ===
A short online spin-off series, Waterloo Road Reunited, was commissioned in November 2010 and ran for six episodes in 2011. It focuses on the lives of six school leavers who previously appeared in the main show.

== Transmissions and ratings ==
Series	Episodes	Originally released (UK)		Average viewership (in millions)
Series	Episodes	First released	Last released	Average viewership (in millions)
1	8	9 March 2006	27 April 2006	4.6
2	12	18 January 2007 (Note: Series 2 began airing on BBC One Scotland on 14 January 2007 and in the rest of the UK on 18 January 2007.)	26 April 2007	4.3
3	20	11 October 2007	13 March 2008	5.0
4	20	7 January 2009	20 May 2009	4.7
5	20	28 October 2009	15 July 2010	4.8
6	20	1 September 2010	6 April 2011	4.9
7	30	4 May 2011	25 April 2012	5.1
8	30	23 August 2012	4 July 2013	4.4
9	20	5 September 2013	12 March 2014	4.1
10	20	15 October 2014	9 March 2015	3.6 (Note: The second half of series ten was moved to BBC Three.)
11	7	3 January 2023	14 February 2023	N/A
12	7	16 May 2023	27 June 2023	N/A
13	8	2 January 2024	26 February 2024	N/A
14	8	10 September 2024	29 October 2024	N/A
15	8	11 February 2025	1 April 2025	N/A
16	8	23 September 2025	14 October 2025	N/A
17	8	6 January 2026	27 January 2026	N/A

The final episode of series 3 attracted 6 million viewers. The final episode of series 4 and 5 each attracted 4.5 million viewers.

The finale of series 10 aired on 9 March 2015, nine years after the first episode aired on 9 March 2006.

== Awards and nominations ==
Year	Award	Category	Nominee(s)	Result
2006	TV Quick and TV Choice Awards	Best New Drama	Waterloo Road	Won
2007	TV Quick and TV Choice Awards	Best Loved Drama	Waterloo Road	Nominated
2007	TV Quick and TV Choice Awards	Best Actress	Jill Halfpenny (Izzie Redpath)	Won
2008	Digital Spy Soap Awards	Best Serial Drama	Waterloo Road	Nominated
2008	TV Quick and TV Choice Awards	Best Loved Drama	Waterloo Road	Nominated
2008	TV Quick and TV Choice Awards	Best Actress	Denise Welch (Steph Haydock)	Nominated
2009	TV Quick and TV Choice Awards	Best Actor	Neil Morrissey (Eddie Lawson)	Nominated
2009	TV Quick and TV Choice Awards	Best Family Drama	Waterloo Road	Won
2009	TV Quick and TV Choice Awards	Best Actress	Denise Welch (Steph Haydock)	Won
2010	TV Quick and TV Choice Awards	Best Family Drama	Waterloo Road	Nominated
2010	TV Quick and TV Choice Awards	Best Actress	Denise Welch (Steph Haydock)	Won
2010	Royal Television Society North West Awards	Best Script Writer	Ann McManus	Won
2010	Inside Soap Awards	Best Drama	Waterloo Road	Won
2011	TV Quick and TV Choice Awards	Best Family Drama	Waterloo Road	Nominated
2011	TV Quick and TV Choice Awards	Best Actress	Amanda Burton (Karen Fisher)	Nominated
2011	Inside Soap Awards	Best Drama	Waterloo Road	Won
2011	16th National Television Awards	Most Popular Drama	Waterloo Road	Won
2011	British Academy Television Awards	Continuing Drama	Waterloo Road	Nominated
2011	Broadcast Awards	Best Soap or Continuing Drama	Waterloo Road	Nominated
2012	TV Quick and TV Choice Awards	Best Actress	Jaye Jacobs (Sian Diamond)	Nominated
2012	TV Quick and TV Choice Awards	Best Family Drama	Waterloo Road	Nominated
2012	Inside Soap Awards	Best Drama	Waterloo Road	Won
2012	17th National Television Awards	Most Popular Female Drama Performance	Jaye Jacobs (Sian Diamond)	Nominated
2012	17th National Television Awards	Most Popular Drama Series	Waterloo Road	Nominated
2013	TV Quick and TV Choice Awards	Best Drama Series	Waterloo Road	Nominated
2013	Inside Soap Awards	Best Drama	Waterloo Road	Won
2014	TV Quick and TV Choice Awards	Best Drama Series	Waterloo Road	Nominated
2014	TV Quick and TV Choice Awards	Best Actress	Laurie Brett (Christine Mulgrew)	Nominated
2014	British Academy Scotland Awards	Best Actress – Television	Laurie Brett (Christine Mulgrew)	Nominated
2014	Inside Soap Awards	Best Drama	Waterloo Road	Won
2015	Inside Soap Awards	Best Drama	Waterloo Road	Nominated
2024	Royal Television Society Awards	Soap and Continuing Drama	Waterloo Road	Nominated
2024	Inside Soap Awards	Best Drama Star	Adam Thomas (Donte Charles)	Won
2024	Inside Soap Awards	Best Drama Star	Alicia Forde (Kelly-Jo Rafferty)	Nominated
2024	Inside Soap Awards	Best Drama Star	Angela Griffin (Kim Campbell)	Nominated
2024	Inside Soap Awards	Best Drama Star	James Baxter (Joe Casey)	Nominated
2025
2025	TV Choice Awards	Best Family Drama	Waterloo Road	Nominated
2025	TV Choice Awards	Best Drama Performance	Angela Griffin (Kim Campbell)	Nominated
2025	TV Choice Awards	Best Drama Performance	Jason Manford (Steve Savage)	Nominated
2025	Broadcast Awards	Best Continuing Drama	Waterloo Road	Nominated
2026	Broadcast Awards	Best Continuing Drama	Waterloo Road	Nominated

== International broadcasts ==
Country	Network(s)	Notes
Hong Kong; India; South Korea; Malaysia; Singapore; Thailand	BBC Entertainment	Series 1–3 have been aired in Hong Kong, South Korea, Malaysia, Singapore, Thailand and India. Series 4 has aired.
Europe: Armenia; Austria; Azores; Belarus; Belgium; Bosnia; Bulgaria; Croatia; Cyprus; Czech Republic; France; Germany; Georgia; Greece; Hungary; Italy; Kazakhstan; Latvia; Lithuania; Luxembourg; Macedonia; Malta; Monaco; Netherlands; Portugal; Moldova; Romania; Serbia; Slovakia; Slovenia; Spain; Sweden; Switzerland; Turkey; Ukraine	BBC Entertainment	Series 1 has been aired in a number of European countries.
Estonia	ETV	Series 1–7 have aired under the name Waterloo Roadi kool (The School of Waterloo Road).
Finland	Yle TV1	Series 1–4 have aired under the name Waterloo Roadin koulu (The School of Waterloo Road).
Slovenia	Kanal A	Series 1 has aired in Slovenia.
Bahrain; Egypt; Iraq; Iran; Jordan; Kuwait; Lebanon; Libya; Oman; Qatar; United Arab Emirates; Yemen	BBC Entertainment	Series 1 has aired in the Middle East. Series 2 has aired.
Israel	BBC Entertainment, IETV	
Ireland	Virgin Media Play, Virgin Media Three	2026–present, currently Series 1–3 only.
New Zealand	TV ONE	Series 1–3 have aired in New Zealand.
Australia	ABC	Series 1–4 have aired in Australia.
Russia	BBC Prime	Series 1 has aired in Russia on Networks Russia GMT+2, Russia GMT+3 and Russia GMT+4.
United States	BBC America	Series 1 has been aired in the USA.
South Africa	BBC Entertainment	
Spain	Canal 3XL and TV3	Series 1–9 have been aired only in Catalonia.

== DVD releases ==
Series one and two were released by 2entertain, while series three to eight were released by Acorn DVD. Series eleven onwards were released by Dazzler Media.

Title	Episodes	DVD release date	Total discs	Special features
Series 1	8	26 March 2007	3	—N/a
Series 2	12	10 March 2008	4	Miss Haydock Reveals All; Mika's Video Diary
Series 3	20	2 March 2009 (Autumn Term); 11 May 2009 (Spring Term); 24 May 2010 (Complete)	6	Autumn Term scrap Book; Pupil Reports; Teacher Evaluation; Spring Term scrap Book
Series 4	20	21 September 2009 (Autumn Term); 26 April 2010 (Spring Term); 18 October 2010 (Complete)	6	Autumn Term scrapbook Spring Term scrapbook School Photos
Series 5	20	14 June 2010 (Autumn Term); 27 September 2010 (Spring Term); 23 May 2011 (Complete)	6	Deleted Scenes; Bloopers; Cast/Crew Interviews; Waterloo Road Cribs
Series 6	20	7 February 2011 (Autumn Term); 20 June 2011 (Spring Term); 16 January 2012 (Complete)	6	Staff/Student Photos; Outtakes; Social Networking Snaps; Bloopers
Waterloo Road; Reunited	6	9 April 2012	1	Picture Gallery
Series 7	30	7 October 2011 (Autumn Term); 26 March 2012 (Spring Term); 10 September 2012 (Summer Term); 8 April 2013 (Complete)	9	Social Networking Snaps
Series 8	30	4 February 2013 (Autumn Term); 3 June 2013 (Spring Term); 7 October 2013 (Summer Term); 15 September 2014 (Complete)	9	Behind the Scenes; In the Gym with Kaya & Kirstie; In the Lab with Jaye and Jason; Home from Home with Grantly Budgen
The Legends Of; Waterloo Road	6	16 September 2013	2	6 select episodes from series 3 – 8
Series 11	7	10 April 2023	2	—N/a
Series 12	7	11 September 2023	2	—N/a
Series 13	8	11 March 2024	2	—N/a

== Online ==
All episodes of the original series were made available on BBC iPlayer on 19 September 2019. The popularity of the original show on iPlayer among younger audiences contributed to the show's recommissioning in 2021.

As part of the show's return in 2023, BBC commissioned a podcast series alongside the return of the programme. The podcast was hosted by cast members Adam Thomas (Donte Charles) and Priyasasha Kumari (Samia Choudhury), and released exclusively on BBC Sounds.

Since the revival of the series, each series has been released as a boxset on BBC iPlayer prior to transmission on BBC One.
