= Waterloo Road series 10 =

Waterloo Road
- Series 10
- Promotional image of Series 10
- Starring: Neil Pearson; Laura Aikman; Richard Mylan; Laurie Brett; Victoria Bush; Georgie Glen; Melanie Hill; Angus Deayton; Pooky Quesnel; Vanessa Hehir; Leon Ockenden; Nicola Stephenson; Regé-Jean Page; Stefano Braschi; Zöe Lucker
- No. of episodes: 20

Release
- Original network: BBC One; BBC One HD (episode 1–10); BBC Three (episode 11–20); BBC Three HD (episode 11–20)
- Original release: 15 October 2014 – 9 March 2015

Series chronology
- ← Previous; Series 9 Next → Series 11

The tenth series of the British television drama series Waterloo Road began airing on 15 October 2014 on BBC One, before moving to BBC Three in January 2015 for the final 10 episodes. The show ended its run on 9 March 2015. The series follows the lives of the staff and Students of the eponymous school, a troubled Scottish comprehensive school. The tenth series consisted of twenty episodes. This show marks the last full series of Waterloo Road for 8 years until series 11.

== Plot ==
The show follows the lives of the teachers and the Students at the eponymous school of Waterloo Road, a failing inner-city comprehensive, tackling a wide range of issues often seen as taboo such as the difficulties faced by split families, cybercrime, adultery, illiteracy, domestic violence, nervous breakdown, anger management issues, drug overdose, test anxiety, assault, poverty, starvation, photo manipulation, video game addiction, cyberbullying, anorexia nervosa and borderline personality disorder.

== Cast and characters ==
=== Staff ===
- Neil Pearson as Vaughan Fitzgerald; Headteacher (20 episodes)
- Laura Aikman as Lorna Hutchinson; Deputy Headteacher and Science teacher (10 episodes)
- Richard Mylan as Simon Lowsley; Deputy Headteacher and English teacher (9 episodes)
- Laurie Brett as Christine Mulgrew; Head of English (20 episodes)
- Victoria Bush as Sonya Donnegan; School secretary (20 episodes)
- Georgie Glen as Audrey McFall; Head of History (20 episodes)
- Melanie Hill as Maggie Budgen; Home Economics teacher and Housemistress (20 episodes)
- Angus Deayton as George Windsor; Head of Modern Foreign Languages (13 episodes)
- Pooky Quesnel as Olga Fitzgerald; Geography teacher (12 episodes)
- Vanessa Hehir as Sue Lowsley; Science teacher (10 episodes)
- Leon Ockenden as Hector Reid; Head of Physical Education (10 episodes)
- Nicola Stephenson as Allie Westbrook; Head of Art (10 episodes)
- Regé-Jean Page as Guy Braxton; Trainee teacher in Graphics & Product Design (8 episodes)
- Stefano Braschi as Marco D'Olivera; newly qualified teacher in Science (8 episodes)
- Zöe Lucker as Carol Barry; Canteen assistant (3 episodes)

=== Students ===
- Max Bowden as Justin Fitzgerald (20 episodes)
- Zebb Dempster as Leo Fitzgerald (20 episodes)
- Caitlin Gillespie as Lisa Brown (20 episodes)
- Joe Slater as Lenny Brown (20 episodes)
- Mark Beswick as Darren Hughes (19 episodes)
- Rebecca Craven as Rhiannon Salt (19 episodes)
- Je'Taime Morgan Hanley as Shaznay Montrose (19 episodes)
- Charlotte Beaumont as Kenzie Calhoun (10 episodes)
- Leo Flanagan as Floyd Westbrook (10 episodes)
- Holly Jack as Bonnie Kincaid (10 episodes)
- Tommy Lawrence Knight as Kevin Chalk (10 episodes)
- Tahirah Sharif as Carrie Norton (10 episodes)
- Andrew Still as Scott Fairchild (10 episodes)
- Kane Tomlinson-Weaver as Harley Taylor (10 episodes)
- Armin Karim as Abdul Bukhari (9 episodes)
- Sammy Oliver as Tiffany Westbrook (9 episodes)
- Finlay MacMillan as Dale Jackson (9 episodes)
- Naomi Battrick as Gabriella Wark (7 episodes)
- Brogan Ellis as Kacey Barry (7 episodes)

=== Others ===
==== Recurring ====
- Ian Aspinall as Hassan Bukhari; Abdul's adoptive father (7 episodes)
- Robin Laing as Ronnie Fairchild; Scott's father (5 episodes)
- Judith Barker as Grace Drummond; An elderly woman who befriends Darren and Rhiannon (4 episodes)
- Nadine Marshall as Steph Norton; Guy and Carrie's mother (4 episodes)
- Gareth David-Lloyd as Rob Hutchinson; Lorna's abusive husband (3 episodes)
- Nicola Grier as Selina Wilson; Director of the Waterloo Road and Havelock High merger (3 episodes)
- Emma Cunniffe as Ailsa Calhoun; Kenzie's mother (2 episodes)
- David Michaels as Colin Bond; Headteacher of Havelock High (2 episodes)
- Andy Rush as Danny Spencer; Dale's cycling coach (2 episodes)

==== Guest ====
- Nigel Betts as Ray Stewart; Local shopkeeper (1 episode)
- Claire Cage as Sophie Mitchell; Abdul's social worker (1 episode)
- Robert Cavanah as Jackson Whittaker; Owner of Wiredata (1 episode)
- Nathalie Cox as DI Murray; Detective Inspector investigating the cyberattack on Wiredata (1 episode)
- Ayesha Dharker as Yasmeen Khan; Abdul's biological mother (1 episode)
- Keeley Forsyth as Sammy Hughes; Darren's mother (1 episode)
- Peter F. Gardiner as Mr. Dunbar; Headteacher of Havelock High (1 episode)
- Terence Harvey as Ted Black; Grace's former lover (1 episode)
- Connie Hyde as Amelia Wark; Gabriella's mother (1 episode)
- Nimmy March as Miriam Hurlock; Head of the PTA (1 episode)
- Abby Mavers as Dynasty Barry; Ex-Student and Kevin’s girlfriend (1 episode)
- Bobby Rainsbury as Mandy Ruskin; Mental health patient who befriends Leo (1 episode)
- Hugh Ross as Mr. Carmichael; Elderly member of the community (1 episode)
- Maarten Stevenson as Mickey McArthur; Student at Havelock High (1 episode)

== Episodes ==
No.	Title	Directed by	Written by	Original release date	UK viewers (million)
Autumn Term
181	"Episode 1"	Roberto Bangura	Ann McManus & Eileen Gallagher	15 October 2014	N/A (<4.03) (Note: Not reported in the weekly top 30 programmes for BBC One.)
Following Christine getting demoted as headteacher, her replacement, Vaughan Fitzgerald, arrives at Waterloo Road with his mismatched family, consisting of his new partner, Art teacher Allie Westbrook, her two children Floyd and Tiffany, and later Vaughan’s rebellious older son Justin and his painful and shy son Leo. He is thrown in at the deep end when Darren Hughes makes a horrific discovery at his home. George struggles to admit that his partner Carol Barry has bled him dry over the summer. Note: First appearance of Vaughan, Olga, Justin and Leo Fitzgerald, and Allie, Floyd and Tiffany Westbrook.
182	"Episode 2"	Roberto Bangura	Dare Aiyegbayo & Ann McManus	22 October 2014	N/A (<4.23)
It's the launch of Waterloo Road's big community initiative and Vaughan is desperate for the day to go without a hitch. But with Lisa and Shaznay causing mischief and tensions with George at boiling point, can the new head pull it off? Christine notes chemistry between Sue and Hector, but is it enough to tempt Sue to cheat? Allie comes up with a way to restore peace in her new house, but Justin is still very much on edge. Note: Final appearance of Dynasty Barry and George Windsor (until episode 10).
183	"Episode 3"	Simon Massey	Diane Burrows	29 October 2014	N/A (<3.90)
Rhiannon takes pride in the virtual-baby project and Darren can't understand why she is taking it so seriously, while Maggie fears for her job following the recent events of at the boarding house. Carol spots an opportunity to exploit the school when she fakes an injury but Vaughan is quick to see through her scheme, how long will she last? Rhiannon admits to her pregnancy scare, and finds a potential career path. A brooding Justin spends the day in the cooler, and learns about Tiffany's crush on him. Note: Final appearance of Carol Barry.
184	"Episode 4"	Simon Massey	Ann McManus & Diane Burrows	5 November 2014	N/A (<3.90)
Gabriella Wark returns to school to find some students determined to make her life difficult. Hector finds an ally in Sue, while Allie feels unnerved as Vaughan and the boys get ready to visit Olga on her birthday. While Floyd develops a crush on Gabriella, Justin and Tiffany grow closer. Gabriella throws a party for a select few, however Lisa and Shaznay get wind of the event and invite the entire school. Hector and Sue finally share a passionate kiss, while Tiffany and Justin also give into their feelings. Note: Gabriella Wark returns.
185	"Episode 5"	David Innes Edwards	David McManus	12 November 2014	N/A (<3.98)
Mock exam season is in full swing, and the pressure gets too much for Lenny. Kevin gains access to the pupils predicted grades, which results in Lisa and Shaznay organising an exam protest, but the whole encounter completely stresses Lenny out and results in him having a panic attack. Vaughan tells Olga that he can no longer afford to keep her in the clinic, and when she decides to move away Justin takes the news better than expected. Sue finally gives into her feelings for Hector and they sleep together.
186	"Episode 6"	David Innes Edwards	Karen Laws	19 November 2014	N/A (<4.06)
After Justin sees a boy shoplifting, he takes matters into his own hands and tries to help. When his actions don't get the response he was expecting, things spiral out of control. Simon and Sue's dinner party goes badly wrong after Hector speaks out of turn. Sonya writes a novel and asks the rest of the staff for advice and opinions on the story, much to their dismay, and Floyd becomes suspicious of Justin and Tiffany.
187	"Episode 7"	Sarah Walker	Ann McManus & Eileen Gallagher	26 November 2014	N/A (<3.91)
Floyd confronts Tiffany and Justin about their relationship, and after the two boys gets into a fight, Tiffany worries her brother will spill the beans to Vaughan and Allie. The police descend on Waterloo Road when Kevin's computer hacking on a multinational organisation is traced back to the school, sparking a major security risk, and Sonya's short story looks set to jeopardise her friendship with Christine after it turns out she has drawn inspiration from her colleague's alcoholic past.
188	"Episode 8"	Sarah Walker	Lauren Klee	3 December 2014	N/A (<3.74)
Things are tense in the Fitzgerald-Westbrook household following the revelation that Justin and Tiffany have been sleeping together, and they only get worse when Allie convinces Vaughan to send his son to boarding school. Justin is furious at the news and soon hatches a plot of his own. Darren isn't happy when Rhiannon considers a career as a plus-size model, while Sue looks forward to a fresh start with Simon in Wales. However forgetting Hector proves easier said than done, especially when he makes an impassioned plea for her to stay.
189	"Episode 9"	Jamie Annett	Kelly Jones	10 December 2014	N/A (<4.11)
Leo feels neglected so he is happy to be befriended by new girl Mandy, only to be taken aback when she displays a sudden burst of violent behaviour toward Justin. Although he promises to help her, alarm bells ring for Vaughan and Audrey when the new friends go missing. Hector decides he has had enough of sneaking around and threatens to tell Simon about his affair with Sue. Note: Final appearance of Simon Lowsley.
190	"Episode 10"	Jamie Annett	Wendy Granditer	17 December 2014	N/A (<4.00)
Justin is struggling to deal with the breakdown of his relationship with Tiffany and erupts in a fit of uncontrollable rage, which comes to a head when he punches Allie. His birthday turns into a disaster as he gets arrested by his dad for assaulting Allie and dumped by a resentful Tiffany, ending their friendship as well. Can Vaughan deal with his son or should this now be a matter for the police? Hector pushes Sue to be with him but is left in the cold when she makes it clear she needs some space, while Darren arranges a surprise for Grace but she's not too happy about it. George Windsor makes an unexpected appearance at the school dance with some important information about the future of Waterloo Road. Note: Final appearances of Harley Taylor, Gabriella Wark, Kacey Barry, Sue Lowsley, Hector Reid, and Allie, Tiffany and Floyd Westbrook. George Windsor returns.
Spring Term
191	"Episode 11"	Brian Grant	Chris Murray	5 January 2015	0.89
Unknown to most of the school, Waterloo Road is now under threat as the council want to merge it with nearby school Havelock High. It's a new term, and Vaughan is ready to battle to stop the proposed merger, resulting in the employment of Lorna Hutchinson, and opening the school to troubled pupils, such as Scott Fairchild and Kenzie Calhoun. But Vaughan's day doesn't start easily, with Olga appearing, and Kenzie kicks up and nearly stabs Scott. Bonnie and Scott get together after Rhiannon gives Bonnie a confidence boost, but with secrets waiting for Bonnie just round the corner, will it last? Note: First appearance of Lorna Hutchinson, Carrie Norton, Kenzie Calhoun, Bonnie Kincaid, Scott Fairchild and Dale Jackson. Note: As of Episode 11, the show will now be airing on BBC Three, with a repeat being shown later on BBC One.
192	"Episode 12"	Brian Grant	Di Burrows	12 January 2015	0.76
It's the start of Waterloo Road's new bike bank scheme, which Vaughan hopes will show the school off to the community. But Scott Fairchild has other ideas and it's Kevin who suffers the consequences. Christine and Lorna fight over who should lead the new PTA. Note: First appearance of Abdul and Hassan Bukhari. Final appearance of Kevin Chalk.
193	"Episode 13"	Morag Fullarton	Katie Douglas	19 January 2015	0.69
Newly qualified Marco and trainee Guy start work, but it's not long before Guy recognises Carrie Norton and the school comes down heavily on their relationship. Christine's plan to keep Audrey's smothering at bay backfires on her, while Sonya is forced to reveal a very private secret. Bonnie finds out about Kenzie's learning issues while trying to befriend her. However it is not too long before Scott and Justin find out as well. Much to Justin's amusement a secret of Scott's comes to light, while Bonnie and Justin begin a relationship. Note: First appearance of Marco D'Olivera, Steph Norton and Guy Braxton.
194	"Episode 14"	Morag Fullarton	Karen Laws	26 January 2015	0.60
A school trip to the coast turns sour when Kenzie lets slip about Bonnie two-timing Scott and Justin, and when more secrets are spilled one of the group runs off placing themselves in grave danger. Some of the other students rebel against Marco's textbook teaching methods, tensions run high at the PTA meeting as the staff and parents discuss the implications of a merger with Havelock High. Guy is desperate to hide the fact he is living at the school, only to draw unwanted attention to himself by bickering with Carrie, while a popular experiment with some mints is tested by Marco in order to connect with the pupils.
195	"Episode 15"	Patrick Harkins	Paul Farrell	2 February 2015	0.69
Vaughan is determined that the school makes a good impression when the PTA spends the day visiting Waterloo Road and its swanky rival Havelock High. However, when Lorna and Christine arrange for them to take on an entire new class load of students at the last minute combined with problems with erotic novels, exploding science labs and cyber-bullying it proves to be the headteacher's biggest challenge yet. Meanwhile, Sonya worries about the results of her cancer screening and Leo forms an unhealthy attachment to a computer game, and when George confiscates his laptop in class, it becomes apparent how serious his addiction really is.
196	"Episode 16"	Patrick Harkins	Chris Bucknall	9 February 2015	0.74
It's the day Dale has been waiting for, a rare opportunity to try out for a professional cycling team. His classmates are all behind him, but the pressure of mock exams has interrupted his stringent training routine, leaving Lenny concerned about how little his friend has been eating. Abdul is baffled by his father's reaction to his genetics science project, leading to the revelation of a devastating family secret. Kenzie is unable to reconcile with her mother and moves out, effectively leaving her homeless with no plan in place. Bonnie confides in Leo about her worries when the school is unable to track down her cyberbully.
197	"Episode 17"	Lee Haven Jones	Sally Tatchell	16 February 2015	0.62
Dale is unable to come to terms with his failure to make the cycling team and tries to find his adrenaline rush elsewhere, but Lenny worries his friend's increasingly reckless behaviour is leading him on a path to self-destruction. Hassan panics when PC Fairchild questions him over Abdul's birth documents, so the worried father makes plans to take his son away for a few days. Kenzie finds herself caught in an explosive showdown between Scott and Justin. But who will win?
198	"Episode 18"	Lee Haven Jones	David Bowker	23 February 2015	0.70
Dale's erratic behaviour leaves Maggie and Lenny concerned, but he shuns their support and continues to seek his next big adrenaline rush. However, his actions soon become illegal and dangerous, and as he pushes himself to breaking point, Lenny strives to help his friend before he causes himself real harm. Abdul is nervous about meeting his birth mother, while Bonnie is devastated by the result of the police investigation into her cyberbullying case, and Vaughan finds out about a surprise inspection in advance. Note: First appearance of Rob Hutchinson.
199	"Episode 19"	Steve Hughes	Chris Murray	2 March 2015	0.77
Vaughan's stress levels reach a new high the day before the final merger consultation, and with Justin being threatened with exclusion for his part in the cyberbullying, the head teacher struggles to keep his professional and private lives separate. Lorna is shocked by the sudden appearance of her estranged husband at the school, but as he lends some much-needed expertise to the campaign, will she reconsider her feelings for him? Sonya makes a discovery about Guy that forces her to confront her guilty secret.
200	"Episode 20"	Steve Hughes	Chris Murray	9 March 2015	0.71
The decision day arrives, but with no Vaughan to lead them, the pupils are forced to take matters into their own hands — and soon discover the council is not being entirely honest about its plans. Meanwhile, Marco grows suspicious of Lorna's ex-husband, only for his meddling to make Rob angry and put Marco and Kenzie's lives in danger. Bonnie, with advice from George Windsor, forgives Leo, only to make Leo feel worse and persuades Vaughan to show up for the speech. Waterloo Road is given the news that the merger will not go ahead. The episode ends with a series of shots of different parts of the school and various voiceover quotes from current and previous characters, including Vaughan Fitzgerald, Max Tyler, Finn Sharkey, Kim Campbell, Gabriella Wark, Barry Barry, George Windsor and Carol Barry. The final line of the series is a quote from Grantly Budgen, the show's longest-serving character: "...I turned up for a week's cover - ended up staying 25 years" which he said in Series 5 episode 10 to Steph Haydock. Note: Final appearance of Vaughan, Olga, Justin and Leo Fitzgerald, Abdul and Hasaan Bukhari, Lorna Hutchinson, Christine Mulgrew, George Windsor, Audrey McFall, Guy Braxton, Marco D'Olivera, Maggie Budgen, Sonya Donnegan, Kenzie Calhoun, Scott Fairchild, Dale Jackson, Bonnie Kincaid, Rhiannon Salt, Darren Hughes, Shaznay Montrose, Lenny & Lisa Brown.
