= Waterloo Road series 5 =

Waterloo Road
- Series 5
- DVD cover
- Starring: Eva Pope; William Ash; Angela Griffin; Denise Welch; Elizabeth Berrington; Philip Martin Brown; Jason Done; Sarah-Jane Potts; Elaine Symons; Tom Chambers; Vinette Robinson; Steven Waddington; Kay Purcell
- No. of episodes: 20

Release
- Original network: BBC One
- Original release: 28 October 2009 – 15 July 2010

Series chronology
- ← Previous; Series 4 Next → Series 6

The fifth series of the British television drama series Waterloo Road began broadcasting on 28 October 2009 and ended on 15 July 2010 on BBC One. The series follows the lives of the faculty and students of the eponymous school, a failing inner-city comprehensive school. It consists of twenty episodes, divided into two half-series of ten episodes each and featured one of the biggest cast changes in the show's history.

Due to extensive news coverage on 11 May 2010, regarding UK Prime Minister David Cameron's election and the formation of a coalition government, EastEnders and Holby City were instead shown on 12 May, and Waterloo Road was postponed for two weeks, due to the already scheduled Holby City episode on 19 May. The final two episodes of the series were delayed by four weeks, due to the 2010 FIFA World Cup, airing on 14 and 15 July respectively. The fifth series achieved an average of 5.03 million viewers in the ratings.

== Plot ==
The show follows the lives of the teachers and the Students at the eponymous school of Waterloo Road, a failing inner-city comprehensive, tackling a wide range of issues often seen as taboo such as murder, binge drinking, child sexual abuse, suicide pacts, schizophrenia, bankruptcy, chemical burns, workplace bullying, hemangioma, bribery, clinical depression, prescription drug abuse and false accusations of rape.

== Cast and characters ==
=== Staff ===
- Eva Pope as Rachel Mason; Headteacher (19 episodes)
- William Ash as Christopher "Chris" Mead; Deputy Headteacher and Science teacher (20 episodes)
- Angela Griffin as Kim Campbell; Head of Pastoral Care and Art teacher (20 episodes)
- Denise Welch as Steph Haydock; French teacher (20 episodes)
- Elizabeth Berrington as Ruby Fry; Head of Food Technology (20 episodes)
- Philip Martin Brown as Grantly Budgen; English teacher (20 episodes)
- Jason Done as Tom Clarkson; Head of English (18 episodes)
- Sarah-Jane Potts as Jo Lipsett; Head of Languages (18 episodes)
- Elaine Symons as Rose Kelly; Canteen Assistant (14 episodes)
- Tom Chambers as Max Tyler; Executive Head (10 episodes)
- Vinette Robinson as Helen Hopewell; English teacher (8 episodes)
- Steven Waddington as Adam Fleet; Healthy Schools Co-ordinator (8 episodes)
- Kay Purcell as Candice Smilie; Senior Canteen Assistant (2 episodes)

=== Students ===
- Phoebe Dynevor as Siobhan Mailey (20 episodes)
- Ayesha Gwilt as Amy Porter (20 episodes)
- Darcy Isa as Lauren Andrews (20 episodes)
- Holly Kenny as Sambuca Kelly (20 episodes)
- Thomas Milner as Paul Langley (20 episodes)
- Lucy Dixon as Danielle Harker (19 episodes)
- Sophie McShera as Ros McCain (19 episodes)
- Tachia Newall as Bolton Smilie (19 episodes)
- William Rush as Josh Stevenson (19 episodes)
- Lauren Thomas as Aleesha Dillon (19 episodes)
- Zaraah Abrahams as Michaela White (17 episodes)
- Shannon Flynn as Emily "Em" James (17 episodes)
- Jessica Baglow as Karla Bentham (16 episodes)
- Dean Smith as Philip Ryan (16 episodes)
- Reece Douglas as Denzil Kelly (14 episodes)
- Jenna-Louise Coleman as Lindsay James (9 episodes)
- Jack McMullen as Finn Sharkey (9 episodes)
- Richie Jeeves as Luke Pendle (7 episodes)
- Rebecca Ryan as Vicki MacDonald (2 episodes)

=== Others ===
==== Recurring ====
- John McArdle as Oliver Mead; Chris's father and Steph's love interest (6 episodes)
- Fiona Allen as Georgia Stevenson; Josh's mother and Tom's ex-girlfriend (4 episodes)
- Louise Delamere as Marion James; Lindsay and Emily's mother (3 episodes)
- Georgia Mackenzie as Jennifer Headley; Head of the LEA and Max's wife (3 episodes)
- Sharlene Whyte as Alison Yates; Lindsay and Emily's social worker (3 episodes)
- Ralph Ineson as John Fry; Ruby's husband (2 episodes)
- Robyn Addison as Anna Reid; Chris's girlfriend (2 episodes)
- Paul Opacic as Ryan Sharkey; Finn's father (2 episodes)

==== Guest ====
- Mykola Allen as Michael Vale; Student (1 episode)
- Dean Andrews as Gary Vale; Bianka and Michael's father (1 episode)
- Jamie Birtwistle as Craig Moran; Student (1 episode)
- Josh Brown as Aiden Keen; Student (1 episode)
- Claire Hackett as Jacqui Keen; Aiden's mother (1 episode)
- Tom McKay as Mark Moran; Craig's brother (1 episode)
- Joanne Mitchell as Mrs. Turner; Cassie's mother (1 episode)
- Samantha Seager as Joely Vale; Bianka and Michael's mother (1 episode)
- Maisie-Jo Stahl as Bianka Vale; Student (1 episode)
- Hayley Tamaddon as Zoe; Photographer (1 episode)
- Charlotte Wakefield as Cassie Turner; Student (1 episode)

== Episodes ==
No.	Title	Directed by	Written by	Original release date	UK viewers (million)
Autumn Term
61	"Episode 1"	Matthew Evans	Ann McManus	28 October 2009	5.06
It's all change at Waterloo Road as it has merged with local private school John Fosters, which was forced to close when wealthy parents could no longer afford the fees. As a result, around 100 new Students are enrolled at Waterloo Road and neither the "posh" John Fosters Students nor the "scuzzy" Waterloo Road kids are happy about it. The rivalry between the 2 schools triggers several fights and it all goes horribly wrong when the two schools have a mass brawl in the playground, which leaves Helen Hopewell unable to cope with the psychological pressure. The playground divisions are echoed in the staffroom as many of the old John Fosters team have been ushered in to ensure the smooth transition, much to the annoyance of the existing staff. Note: First appearance of Josh Stevenson, Ruby Fry, Helen Hopewell, Lindsay and Emily James, Jo Lipsett, Siobhan Mailey, Ros McCain, Christopher "Chris" Mead, Luke Pendle, Amy Porter and Max Tyler.
62	"Episode 2"	Matthew Evans	Maureen Chadwick	4 November 2009	5.97
The hostility between the ex-John Fosters Students and their Waterloo Road peers continues unabated. Tensions increase when Amy Porter accuses Bolton of attempted rape after luring him into the girls' toilets for a tryst; an accusation that a bewildered Bolton is quick to deny. New girl Lindsay James is quick to use the incident as another example that Waterloo Road Students are trouble, happy to have a distraction from her father's funeral which is taking place that day. Meanwhile Tom finds that his past is being unearthed thanks to Josh Stevenson.
63	"Episode 3"	Tim Hopewell	Nick Hoare	11 November 2009	5.78
Danielle and Aleesha stagger into school after a night out drinking in Rochdale's bars and clubs. Danielle, in particular, is suffering, so Paul steals some ethanol from the science lab in order to help her out with a "hair of the dog". Paul and Bolton start bootlegging the ethanol to the other Students, not realising how dangerous the side effects of their concoction could be. Max Tyler soon discovers their scam but it's too late for barely conscious Danielle, who is rushed to hospital by Steph. While this goes on, Rachel and Max's relationship deteriorates and Tom discovers that Josh is indeed his son.
64	"Episode 4"	Tim Hopewell	David McManus	18 November 2009	5.10
Year 10 Student Luke Pendle has kept the fact that he lives in a care home a secret from everyone, including his girlfriend Siobhan Mailey – who finds out the truth when she follows him home. Confused at his deceit, she confides in her best friend, Amy, who quickly spreads Luke's secret around the school. After a day of snide and nasty comments, Luke snaps – only to have the full force of Max Tyler's authoritarian rule descend on him. Steph starts a teaching course, Grantly organises a staff-room petition against Max's reforms and Tom tries to get to know Josh better, despite his son's resistance.
65	"Episode 5"	Fraser MacDonald	Phillip Dodds	25 November 2009	5.40
It's Open Day at Waterloo Road and the school is buzzing with preparations. Max and Rachel are determined to show that the merger with John Fosters is a success and set out to wow the parents and governors with a united school. Ruby Fry, meanwhile, has taken it upon herself to upgrade the school's buffet menu and puts caviar and other pricey sundries on her husband, John's, company credit card. When Ruby sneaks home to pick up some forgotten ingredients, however, she is confronted with bailiffs and John is forced to admit that his company is bankrupt. Steph tries new techniques to get her way with Jo and Josh's relatedness to Tom is made public. Note: First appearance of John Fry and Vicki MacDonald. Final appearance of Candice Smilie.
66	"Episode 6"	Fraser MacDonald	Louise Ironside	2 December 2009	4.54
New deputy head Chris Mead becomes the focus of unwelcome romantic attention when his Year 10 fan club become increasingly brazen. Chris becomes concerned that one of his best students, Vicki MacDonald, is acting strangely, missing classes and handing work in late. When he discovers that Vicki has been sneaking off during school hours to work as an exotic dancer, he visits the club to talk her out of it, inadvertently putting himself in a vulnerable position. Vicki would not give up work and threatens to accuse Chris of sexual harassment if he tells anyone. Josh's attempts to push his mum and dad together results in an admission by his mum that he was conceived with a turkey baster and Tom's stolen sperm. Steph tries to piece together what took place the night before. Note: Final appearance of Vicki MacDonald (until Series 6)
67	"Episode 7"	Jill Robertson	Liz Lake	9 December 2009	5.21
When quiet Year 10 student Cassie Turner accuses Amy, Siobhan and, later, Michaela of bullying her, it looks like the girl gang problem has returned to Waterloo Road. Despite the protests of innocence from the accused girls, however, Cassie's recent detached behaviour, along with her falling grades, is enough for Kim to haul the suspected offenders off to the Cooler. Cassie's best friends, Lauren Andrews and Sambuca Kelly, are hurt that she didn't go to them for help, but also believe she is being bullied. Helen Hopewell continues to struggle to stamp her authority on her Students while Josh discovers the truth about his conception.
68	"Episode 8"	Jill Robertson	Katie Douglas	16 December 2009	N/A (<4.66) (Note: Not reported in the weekly top 30 programmes for BBC One.)
It's the day of Helen Hopewell's first official inspection and she is desperate to impress. Having just spent the night with Max, she now believes their romance might be reignited. Never one to miss an opportunity, Amy offers to keep the entire class under control – if Helen pays her for the favour. Terrified about losing her job, Helen agrees and cannot help but think it's £20 well spent when the inspector is obviously impressed with her "teaching ability". It's only when Helen refuses to give further bribes that Amy runs to Rachel and confesses all. Auditions take place for the school's end of term talent show and Tom takes Josh out for some father-son bonding. Note: Final appearance of Helen Hopewell.
69	"Episode 9"	Jonathan Fox Bassett	Linton Chiswick	23 December 2009	N/A (<5.57)
Rachel accompanies Lindsay to court for her mother's trial, but Marion's case is not going well. In the observation gallery Michaela and Ros McCain are horrified to learn about Lindsay's sexual abuse. After a grilling from the prosecution, Lindsay breaks down in the witness box and finally confesses to Rachel the real events of that fateful day. Jo has been nominated for an award, but there is tension between her and Steph. Max tries to manipulate and bully both staff and students. Note: Final appearance of Lindsay James.
70	"Episode 10"	Jonathan Fox Bassett	Paul Logue	30 December 2009	5.30
The governors have arrived at Waterloo Road to inspect the merger. Little does Rachel realise that Max intends to spend the day convincing them to fire her. Rachel and Max have a showdown in front of the governors, each blaming the other for the merger's failings; it's clear that they're not capable of working together. Sick of fighting a turf war with Max, a defeated Rachel hands in her resignation, believing her departure will at least provide some stability at Waterloo Road. However, Rachel's nephew, Phillip Ryan admits that Max has been abusive towards him and Kim reveals it all. Meanwhile Ruby runs an eventful talent show and Josh decides he wants to take a big step with Tom. Note: Final appearance of Max Tyler and Luke Pendle.
Spring Term
71	"Episode 11"	Matthew Evans	Ann McManus	7 April 2010	5.13
Rachel is determined to put the chaos caused by Max Tyler's dramatic departure firmly behind them. But for Kim it is not so easy to forget as she reveals that she is expecting Max's baby. It's year eight Student Bianka Vale's birthday but the only present she wants is to spend time with her dad, Gary, who has separated from her mum. When Gary turns up at school Bianka is delighted to see him and persuades Grantly to allow her to leave with him. What Grantly doesn't realise is that there is a court order out against Gary, banning him from having unsupervised access to his children. Meanwhile, new Student Finn Sharkey makes his presence felt, quickly making friends with Josh and Amy through his lack of respect for boundaries. Note: First appearance of Finn Sharkey.
72	"Episode 12"	Matthew Evans	David McManus	14 April 2010	4.90
Ruby is still struggling to cope with her personal problems but is reluctant to take anti-depressants. To make matters worse she takes the year 10 class on a trip to a local farm, only for it to be a disaster from the outset with Lauren and Sambuca involved in an act of theft and Josh ending up in hospital. Run by Mark Moran, the older brother of year 10 Student Craig, the farm is in deep financial trouble. Mark had asked Craig to cancel the trip as the farm is in no state for visitors but Craig "forgot"; he was hoping Ruby would see how much trouble they were in and help convince Mark to sell up.
73	"Episode 13"	Tim Hopewell	Sasha Hails	21 April 2010	5.13
Kim and Chris come to blows over his introduction of an APU (Advanced Preparation for University) scheme for Ros, the school's brightest Student. Kim believes the scheme should be open to everyone, but Chris thinks it's cruel to build up Students' hopes of getting into a top university if their grades aren't strong enough. It's a battle of wills, won when Michaela stages a protest demanding to be allowed on the scheme and Rachel opens it up to everyone. Elsewhere, overweight Student Aidan causes difficulties and Rachel searches for a new Healthy Eating Head, but gets a blast from the past. First appearance of Adam Fleet.
74	"Episode 14"	Tim Hopewell	Lisa Holdsworth	28 April 2010	5.33
It's Josh's birthday and Tom is planning a party. Josh and Lauren's flirting picks up pace, only to come to an abrupt end when the secret of Lauren's large birthmark on her back is revealed to the whole school. Totally humiliated and desperate, Lauren steals hydrogen peroxide from the science lab to try to bleach the birthmark away, but ends up getting an acid burn. Josh's treatment of Lauren leads to Tom's first disappointment in his son. Ruby organises a fashion swap and Grantly seems to be displaying textbook symptoms of depression.
75	"Episode 15"	Joss Agnew	Phillip Dodds	5 May 2010	5.31
It's work experience day at Waterloo Road. Lauren and Josh are less than impressed with their jobs as a hairdresser and chef respectively while Chris ends up with Finn Sharkey as a teaching assistant. Finn cockily decides he can easily do Chris's job, and encourages mutiny in a year-8 class. In retaliation, Chris sets Finn up by giving him full authority in a classroom of year 12s, resulting in Finn being laughed at by the sixth formers who do not take him seriously. Sambuca elopes from her sports shop work experience to spend time with Bolton.
76	"Episode 16"	Joss Agnew	Alison Greenaway	26 May 2010	4.49
New boy Finn's disruptive behaviour continues at Waterloo Road and he persuades Josh and Amy to join him in smoking a legal high. For Amy, it's a far-from-pleasant experience and Josh has further side-effects when he starts hallucinating in class. Tom, worried about his son's behaviour, questions Josh who "fesses" up – believing that his dad would be cool about it as they are more like friends than father and son. However, Josh is stunned and humiliated by Tom's angry reaction and in retaliation he spikes Tom's lunch with the drug, which puts both Tom and Kim in danger. Rachel's day of absence leaves Chris in charge with an important visitor and Adam, head of the Healthy Eating Programme, gives Ruby a helping hand.
77	"Episode 17"	Jon Sen	Katie Douglas	2 June 2010	3.55
Head of Modern Languages Jo Lipsett is full of encouragement for her brightest Student, Ros, unaware that the girl has developed a serious crush on her. Buoyed by the success of her first exam, Ros kisses a shocked Jo, believing that she feels the same way – but Jo quickly goes to tell Rachel. When Rachel reveals that she knows about the kiss, a humiliated Ros confronts Jo – publicly declaring her love in the process. Jo angrily denies any feelings and in retaliation Ros formally accuses Jo of acting inappropriately which leaves Rachel with no choice but to suspend Jo, leaving her questioning her future at Waterloo Road. Chris feels his APU scheme is under threat while Adam launches a takeaway food service. Note: Final appearance of Rose Kelly (until Series 6). Side Note: This was the very first episode of Waterloo Road without an appearance from Jason Done as Tom Clarkson.
78	"Episode 18"	Jon Sen	Liz Lake	9 June 2010	N/A (<4.02)
Kim accompanies Chris on a Year 10 trip to an Art Gallery as she believes it will improve their relationship. Amy is encouraged by Finn to draw on priceless works of art, only to be caught on CCTV. Chris meets up with an attractive longtime friend who wants more whilst on the trip. Kim is jealous and when Chris tells his friend that he's in love with Kim, she confronts her, after which Kim goes into premature labour alone and helpless. Rachel announces she's engaged to Adam, whilst Ruby moves into a rundown flat, still taking medication.
79	"Episode 19"	Matthew Evans	Alison Greenaway	14 July 2010	4.84
Finn and Amy are separated during school hours in an effort to get their behaviour on track. They both lose it when Josh and Siobhan refuse to help them respectively. Meanwhile, the end of term ball is being organised and to keep prices low for students, the organisers are tasked with fundraising ideas. Adam starts making wedding preparations which affects Ruby whose husband has asked for a divorce. Things go overboard for Ruby when she locks Amy in a cupboard after refusing to allow her absence from the classroom to see Finn, and then even more so when, confronted with Rachel, she slaps her after Rachel accuses her of being drug-dependent.
80	"Episode 20"	Matthew Evans	Nick Hoare	15 July 2010	4.47
When his parents tell him they're moving to Los Angeles, Finn is furious, and his relationship with Amy looks doomed. Amy is later stunned when he proposes they make a suicide pact, rather than live without each other. A nervous Amy, who has become so dependent on him, agrees and they head off to an isolated beach. Rachel, Chris and Kim all come together to find the pair, but Rachel's determination to solve the issue at hand has an effect on Adam, who openly questions her commitment to him, putting their marriage in jeopardy. Meanwhile Steph, with the help of Oliver, organises the school prom. Note: Final appearance of Karla Bentham, Aleesha Dillon, Danielle Harker, Paul Langley, Rachel Mason, Michaela White, Philip Ryan, Jo Lipsett, Siobhan Mailey, Ros McCain, Adam Fleet, Steph Haydock (until Series 6), Bolton Smilie (until Series 8) and Kim Campbell (until Series 11).

== DVD release ==
Three different box sets of the fifth series were released. The first ten episodes of the series were released on 14 June 2010, and the back ten episodes were released on 27 September 2010. All twenty episodes were later released together on 23 May 2011. They were released with a "12" British Board of Film Classification (BBFC) certificate (meaning it is unsuitable for viewing by those under the age of 12 years).
