= Holly Matthews =

English actress and vlogger

- Born: Holly Wilkinson; 13 October 1984 (age 41); Newcastle upon Tyne, England
- Occupations: Actress; vlogger
- Years active: 1997–present
- Spouse: Ross Blair (m. 2012; died 2017)
- Children: 2

Holly Matthews (née Wilkinson; born 13 October 1984) is an English actress, self development coach and author. From 1997 to 2003, she portrayed the role of Emma Miller in the BBC series Byker Grove.

== Career ==
Matthews started her career in the BBC children's drama Byker Grove, portraying the role of Emma Miller from 1997 to 2003. In 2003, she left the series to pursue a singing career after signing to Sony UK, and released a single, "Little Miss Perfect". The song's instrumentation consists of a guitar and synthesiser. An editor from Cambridge News noted that "Little Miss Perfect" is reminiscent of songs released by Canadian recording artist, Avril Lavigne. However, they felt that it was "not the worst single ever made", although "not one you're likely to remember either." Matt Gray of The Digital Fix wrote that the song "doesn't quite scan", and joked that it has "all the ferocity and attitude of a cute ickle Care Bear. He also felt that "Amy Studt and Avril Lavigne do it a lot better" and went on to describe it as a "bland, uninspired pop tune". "Little Miss Perfect" peaked at number 32 on the UK Singles Chart in the week dated 28 February 2004.

Matthews attended the British drama school East 15 in 2005, and left after winning a high-profile role in the BBC drama Waterloo Road, playing the bully Leigh-Ann Galloway. Since that role, Matthews has continued to act in BBC's Doctors, playing Connie Whitfield; in ITV's The Bill playing drug addict Josie Clarke; and she was back in Doctors in 2009, playing Tansy Flack.

Away from her acting career, Matthews works as a self-development coach. In November 2016, she launched her flagship online, self-development course The Bossing it! Academy.

After the death of her husband following a three-year battle with a brain tumour, Matthews launched The Happy Me Project online, her straight-talking brand of self-development.

Matthews is a Huffington Post blogger, and was personally asked by Arianna Huffington to write for Thrive Global. Matthews is also a paid vlogger, creating content for Channel Mum.

Matthews continues to work in self development as a coach, author TedX speaker and founder of The Happy Me Project. Matthews first book The Happy Me Project - The No Nonsense Guide to Self Development was released in 2022 (Bloomsbury Publishing UK) and hit number one in the Amazon charts in its first day. It also won Health and Wellbeing Magazine's wellbeing book of 2022.

Matthews second book, Find Your Confidence - The No Nonsense Guide to Self belief was released in 2024 and Matthews shared its release on Lorraine.

Matthews was diagnosed with ADHD as an adult and has spoken on ADHD Chatter Podcast, with Alex Partridge and the BBC about its impact.

Matthews is now seen as an expert speaker in confidence and self belief and is interviewed for magazines (Global Woman), Irish News radio and TV on this topic.

== Filmography ==
Year	Title	Role	Notes
1997–2003	Byker Grove	Emma Miller	100 episodes
2005	Teen Diary	Claire Robinson	Short
2007	Give It to Me	Paula	Short
2007	Waterloo Road	Leigh-Ann Galloway	3 episodes
2007	The Bill	Josie Clarke	Episode: "Day of Reckoning"
2007, 2009	Doctors	Connie Whitfield, Tansy Flack	Episode: "Teenage Kicks"; Episode: "No Going Back"
2008	Beautiful People	Adult Imelda	Episode: "How I Got My Nose "; credited as Hollie Summer
2009	Not Dead Yet	Sara	
2010	Almost, But Not Quite	Ashley Andrews	Mini series
2010	The Dinner Party	Beth	
2010	Small Hours	Teri	Short
2011, 2012, 2014	Casualty	Candy Carter, Taylor Jones, Gina Timpson	Episode: "Till Death Us Do Part"; Episode: "Cuckoo's Nest"; Episode: "Keeping Schtum"; Episode: "Blood Is Thicker Than Water"
2012	That Day	Gemma	Short film
2013	Stew & Punch	Chloe	Short film
2014	The Friday Fund	Sam	Short film
2018	Tommie	Tommie's Mother (voice)	Short film
2018	Tin Holiday	Portman	Feature Film

== Personal life ==
Matthews gave birth five weeks early to a daughter, Brooke, early in 2011. At five months old, Brooke was diagnosed with meningitis, which Matthews herself had at seven years old. In October 2016, a video showing Brooke telling off the prime minister of the United Kingdom, Theresa May, went viral. Matthews also has a daughter called Texas born in 2013.

On 29 July 2017, Matthews' husband Ross Blair, son of Andy Blair and brother of Matty Blair, died from a brain tumour. Matthews has raised more than £11,000 for the Warwickshire hospice where her husband spent his final days.
