= Lauren Drummond =

British actress

- Born: Greater Manchester, England
- Occupation: Actress
- Years active: 2001–present

Lauren Drummond is an English actress. She is best known for her roles as Mika Grainger in Waterloo Road, Chantelle Lane in Holby City, Suzie Chapman in DI Ray for ITV and Faye Clark in The Royal.

== Early life and education ==
Lauren Drummond was born and brought up in Cheadle Hulme in Stockport.

She attended Bramhall High School before completing a performing arts course at Mid Cheshire College. Drummond also studied at Yale University’s Summer Conservatory for Actors and a Laine Theatre Arts Workshop in Manchester.

Drummond is a third cousin of her former Holby City co-star Tina Hobley.

== Career ==
Drummond began her acting career with small roles in Coronation Street, Grange Hill and Heartbeat, however from 2006 until 2008, Drummond played Mika Grainger in the BBC school-based drama series Waterloo Road. She would later return to the series in 2024, appearing in the season finale of the shows thirteenth series. Drummond would go on to tour the UK in a stage production of Billy Liar.

From 2009 until 2011, Drummond played Faye Clark in The Royal, before moving on to join the cast of Holby City as new nurse Chantelle Lane. She appeared in over 100 episodes of Holby City before leaving the show in 2013. She was part of the shows 2013 Children In Need special featuring Catherine Tate. Drummond returned to the role of Lane for a single episode in June 2016. She had previously appeared as a one-off character, Hannah Sharpe, on the show in 2008.

In 2014, she toured the UK in a production of J.B. Priestley’s classic play Dangerous Corner.

In 2019, Drummond appeared as Jane Bestwick in ITV soap opera Coronation Street. She would go on to appear in I Hate Suzie alongside Billie Piper, before joining the cast of DI Ray in 2024.

== Filmography ==
=== Film ===
Year	Title	Role	Notes
2013	Desire	Barista	Short films
2013	Life's a Bitch	Monica	Short films
2013	Be Gentle	Charlotte	Short films
2019	Secret Santa	Maddy	Short films

=== Television ===
Year	Title	Role	Notes
2001	Coronation Street	Christie Wells	Guest role; 2 episodes
2001	Doctors	Kirsty Matthews	Series 3; Episode 2: "A Twist of Fate"
2005	Grange Hill	Lucy	Series 28; Episode 18
2005–2006	Heartbeat	Jane Black	Supporting role; 7 episodes
2006–2008, 2024	Waterloo Road	Mika Grainger	Regular role; 40 episodes
2006	Blue Murder	Hayley Scott	Series 3; Episode 1: "Steady Eddie"
2006	Doctors	Amy Faulkner	Series 8; Episode 42: "Daddy Cool"
2008	Doctors	Charlotte Peel	Series 9; Episode 208: "Out with the Bathwater"
2008	Holby City	Hannah Sharpe	Series 10; Episode 33: "Any Port in a Storm"
2008	Harley Street	Lisa	Series 1; Episode 2
2009	Casualty	Bree	Series 24; Episode 12: "Second Chance"
2009–2011	The Royal	Student Nurse Faye Clark	Supporting role; 8 episodes
2010	Doctors	Sophie Stanyard	Series 12; Episode 11: "Digging for Gold"
2011–2013, 2016	Holby City	Chantelle Lane	Regular role; 107 episodes
2013	Catherine Tate for Children in Need	Chantelle Lane	Children in Need special
2012	Pointless Celebrities	Herself - Contestant (with Adam Astill)	Series 3; Episode 11: "Daytime 1"
2016	Comedy Playhouse	Receptionist	Series 17; Episode 2: "Broken Biscuits"
2018	The Dumping Ground	Hilde (Shaz)	Series 6; Episode 1: "Jody on the Ropes"
2018	Unforgotten	Kelly Jones	Series 3; Episodes 1 & 2
2018	Press	Belle Hicks	Mini-series; Episode 2: "Pure"
2019	Silent Witness	Tamsin Nelson	Series 22; Episode 1: "Two Spirits: Part 1"
2019	Coronation Street	Jane Bestwick	Recurring role; 5 episodes
2022	I Hate Suzie	Georgina Kaplan	Series 2; Episodes 1 & 3
2023	Hapless	Sandy	Series 2; Episode 2: "The Wedding Planner"
2024	DI Ray	Suzie Chapman	Series 2; Episodes 1–6
