= Katie Griffiths =

English actress

- Born: 6 April 1989 (age 36)
- Occupation: Actress
- Years active: 1999–present
- Spouse: Matthew Wardle (m. 2022)
- Children: 1

Katie Griffiths (born 6 April 1989) is an English actress. She is best known for her role as Chlo Grainger in the BBC school drama Waterloo Road (2006–2009, 2023). She also appeared in the History miniseries Hatfields & McCoys (2012).

== Early life ==
Griffiths grew up in Kildwick, North Yorkshire and attended South Craven School. She joined Stage 84, the Yorkshire School of Performing Arts aged 12.

== Career ==
In 2006, Griffiths began appearing in the BBC One school-based drama Waterloo Road from the first ever episode, broadcast on 9 March 2006, and made her last appearance in 2009. She's appeared opposite Nicholas Hoult as Alice in the BAFTA nominated television film Coming Down the Mountain; she has also appeared in multiple episodes of Casualty and Doctors and in Paradox in 2009 as Leah Holt. Since January 2010 she has appeared in two episodes of the Only Fools and Horses prequel Rock & Chips as Glenda and as Suzy in the Prime Suspect prequel Prime Suspect 1973 (also known as Prime Suspect: Tennison). She also starred opposite Kevin Costner and Bill Paxton in the multi Emmy Award winning mini-series Hatfields & McCoys portraying Alifair McCoy. In 2020, she appeared in another episode of the BBC soap opera Doctors as Ali Brinkshaw.

In 2023, Griffiths reprised her role as Chlo in Waterloo Road for one episode, in which the character was killed off.

In 2025, Griffiths served as the voice actor, playing a noblewoman Rosa Ruthard, a character in the video game Kingdom Come: Deliverance II.

== Personal life ==
Griffiths married Matthew Wardle in July 2022. The couple have a son (born 2024).

== Filmography ==
Year	Title	Role	Notes
1999	Honky Sausages	Honky Nipper	Series 1: Episode 1
2006–2009, 2023	Waterloo Road	Chlo Grainger	Regular role (Season 1-4), Special Guest Starring (Season 11)
2007	Coming Down the Mountain	Alice	Television film
2007	Casualty	Lucy Haninford	Episode: "Close Encounters"
2008	After Work Drinks	Michelle	Short film
2008	Doctors	Gemma Mason	Episode: "The One"
2009	Paradox	Leah Holt	Series 1: Episode 5
2009	Casualty	Ellie Graham Poplikova	Episodes: "Dawn of the ED: Parts 1 & 2"
2010	Five Days	Rowan Porter	Episodes: "Day 1" and "Day 8"
2010	Doctors	Kye Clifton	Episode: "Something Evil"
2010	Rock & Chips	Glenda	Episodes: "Pilot" and "Five Gold Rings"
2012	Hatfields & McCoys	Alifair McCoy	Main role
2012	Casualty	Sarah Samuels	Episode: "Tough Love"
2016	Father Brown	Rose Kane	Episode: "The Brewer's Daughter"
2016	Casualty	Livvy Minter	Episode: "All I Want For Christmas Is You"
2017	Prime Suspect 1973	Suzy	Series 1: Episode 1
2020	Doctors	Ali Brinkshaw	Episode: "Fire Proof"
