= Ann McManus =

Scottish screenwriter (1957–2025)

- Born: 6 October 1957; Ayr, Scotland
- Died: 16 August 2025 (aged 67)
- Education: University of Glasgow; Jordanhill College
- Occupation: Television screenwriter
- Years active: c. 1980s–2013
- Known for: Being the co-founder of Shed Productions
- Notable work: Waterloo Road
- Political party: Communist Party of Scotland (c. 1980s–1990s)
- Spouse(s): Peter Breeze (m. 1980; div. 1990) Eileen Gallagher (m. 2006) (civil union)

Ann McManus (6 October 1957 – 16 August 2025) was a Scottish television screenwriter best known as the creator and writer of the television series Waterloo Road, and for her work on series including Coronation Street.

== Early life and education ==
Ann McManus was born in Ayr, Scotland on 6 October 1957, to James and Frances McManus. Her father was a railwayman. Her mother was an administrative assistant prior to having children; after raising them she later became a special education teacher. McManus was the second of six children.

McManus attended St. John's Primary School in Ayr, and then Queen Margaret Academy. After a stint in a call centre, she earned a degree in English language and literature from the University of Glasgow. She then earned a Diploma of Education while training at Jordanhill School.

== Career ==
McManus began her career as a teacher in 1984 in Castlemilk, then in Rutherglen. After seeing a newspaper ad, she enrolled in a distance learning course to learn to write short stories. Her first screenwriting was for the soap opera Take the High Road. McManus went on to work on a range of long-running and successful drama series including Coronation Street, Waterloo Road, Bad Girls, and Footballers' Wives.

She was creative director and co-founder of Shed Productions with ITV manager Eileen Gallagher and writer Maureen Chadwick. Shed produced Bad Girls, set in a women's prison, for ITV in 1998. Bad Girls featured British TV's first long-term lesbian relationship. Footballers' Wives ran for several seasons as primetime TV from 2002 to 2006. Waterloo Road for the BBC drew on McManus' own experience of working in schools. Shed was bought by Warner Brothers in 2013, valued at £100 million.

After her career in writing for television brought her success, McManus later established a master's program in television fiction writing at Glasgow Caledonian University to support new screenwriters.

== Personal life and death ==
In 1980, McManus married Peter Breeze, whom she had met in university. They divorced in 1990. In 2006, she and Eileen Gallagher entered a civil partnership.

While in university, McManus joined the Communist party and became a highly active member. She left the party in the early 1990s. McManus was a keen singer, and supporter of various lesbian and gay campaigns, including LGB Alliance. McManus died from a cardiac arrest on 16 August 2025, at the age of 67.
