= Waterloo Road series 16 =

Waterloo Road
- Series 16
- Starring: Lindsey Coulson; James Baxter; Ryan Clayton; Jo Coffey; Neil Fitzmaurice; Saira Jackson; Kym Marsh; Christopher Jeffers; Rachel Leskovac; Jon Richardson; Shauna Shim; Adam Thomas; Jason Merrells
- No. of episodes: 8

Release
- Original network: BBC One; BBC iPlayer
- Original release: 23 September – 14 October 2025

Series chronology
- ← Previous; Series 15 Next → Series 17

The sixteenth series of the British television drama series Waterloo Road commenced on 23 September 2025, and concluded on 14 October 2025. The series comprised 8 episodes.

== Production ==
Series 16 was announced along with series 17 in August 2024. In September 2025, further details around the series was revealed, with 8 episodes commissioned for the sixteenth series, it also confirmed that Series 16 would premiere on 23 September 2025, with the full series being released on BBC iPlayer prior to transmission.

=== Casting ===
The majority of series regulars from the fifteenth series reprised their roles for this series, these included Lindsey Coulson, James Baxter, Jo Coffey, Saira Choudhry, Neil Fitzmaurice, Rachel Leskovac, Kym Marsh, Shauna Shim, and Adam Thomas, portraying Stella Drake, Joe Casey, Wendy Whitwell, Nisha Chandra, Neil Guthrie, Coral Walker, Nicky Walters, Valerie Chambers, and Donte Charles. Katherine Pearce, who played early careers teacher Amy Spratt beginning with the eleventh series, does not return in a regular role after her character resigned in the previous series, but does make a guest appearance in episode six.

In April 2025, it was confirmed that Jon Richardson would join the cast as Darius Donovan, a new media studies teacher at Waterloo Road. Jason Merrells also returns as Jack Rimmer in a series regular capacity, after a guest stint in the fifteenth series.

Returning recurring cast members include Ryan Clayton, Hollie-Jay Bowes, Kerry Howard, Lauren Patel and Tom Wells as Mike Rutherford, Debs Rafferty, Serena-Michelle Davies, Jas Sharma, and Marc Todd.

Returning Students include Scarlett Thomas, Summer Violet Bird, Liam Scholes, and Thapelo Ray as Donte's daughter Izzy Charles, Nicky's daughter Tonya Walters, Noel McManus, and Joe's former foster son Dwayne Jackson. Other students include Hattie Dynevor and Lucy Chambers as Neil's daughters Libby and Cat, Chiamaka Ulebor, Zak Sutcliffe, Maisie Robinson, Tillie Amartey, Miya Ocego, Sonya Nisa, Aabay Noor Ali, Danny Murphy and Niamh Blackshaw as Shola Aku, school troublemaker Schumacher 'Schuey' Weever, his sister Portia Weever, Stacey 'Stace' Neville, Lois Taylor-Brown, Aleena Qureshi, Mollie 'Mog' Richardson, Luca Smith, and Agnes Eccleston. Matthew Khan, who portrayed Jared Jones beginning with the fourteenth series, does not return after his character is arrested at the end of last series.

In September 2025, it was confirmed that Fintan Buckard and Savannah Kunyo had joined the cast as Ben Drake and Hope Drake, the grandchildren of headmistress Stella Drake (Lindsey Coulson) and new Students at Waterloo Road. Christine Bottomley also joined the cast as Stella Drake's (Lindsey Coulson) daughter, Sam Drake. In addition, Christopher Jeffers joined the cast as Mitch Swift, the new special educational needs coordinator of Waterloo Road. William Fox makes a guest appearance in episodes three and six as Shuey and Portia's father Pete, after last recurring in the thirteenth series, while Sia Kiwa returns as Lisa Jackson, Dwayne and Zain's mother in episode four, having last appeared in series twelve. In episode six, Denise Black guests as Noel's grandmother Mo, and Francesco Piacentini-Smith returns as former Student Dean Weever, who last appeared in series fourteen.

=== Scheduling ===
The sixteenth series debuted on 23 September 2025 on BBC One. In a difference from previous series, two episodes would air the same night as opposed to one episode weekly. The series was also released as a boxset on BBC iPlayer at 6am on 23 September 2025, as per previous series.

== Cast and characters ==
=== Main cast ===
- Lindsey Coulson as Dame Stella Drake; Headteacher
- James Baxter as Joe Casey; Deputy Head and languages teacher
- Ryan Clayton as Mike Rutherford; Waterloo Road's assigned police officer and Joe's husband
- Jo Coffey as Wendy Whitwell; PA to Headteacher
- Neil Fitzmaurice as Neil Guthrie; History teacher
- Saira Jackson as Nisha Chandra; Maths teacher, Science Teacher and Acting Deputy Head
- Kym Marsh as Nicky Walters; Head of Catering Services (until episode 2)
- Jon Richardson as Darius Donovan; Media studies teacher
- Shauna Shim as Valerie Chambers; Music teacher
- Adam Thomas as Donte Charles; PE teacher
- Jason Merrells as Jack Rimmer; School counsellor, later briefly also Deputy Head
- Christopher Jeffers as Mitch Swift; Special educational needs coordinator (from episode 3)
- Rachel Leskovac as Coral Walker; Deputy Head and English teacher (episodes 5 and 7)

=== Students ===
- Scarlett Thomas as Izzy Charles
- Summer Violet Bird as Tonya Walters
- Thapelo Ray as Dwayne Jackson
- Inathi Rozani as Zayne Jackson
- Chiamaka Ulebor as Shola Aku
- Hattie Dynevor as Libby Guthrie
- Zak Sutcliffe as Schumacher 'Schuey' Weever
- Tillie Amartey as Stacey 'Stace' Neville
- Liam Scholes as Noel McManus
- Maisie Robinson as Portia Weever
- Aabay Noor Ali as Mollie 'Mog' Richardson
- Sonya Nisa as Aleena Qureshi
- Miya Ocego as Lois Taylor-Brown
- Danny Murphy as Luca Smith
- Lucy Chambers as Cat Guthrie
- Niamh Blackshaw as Agnes Eccleston
- Alfie Corbett as Forest Sumi
- Teddy Wallwork as Declan Brown
- Cory McClane as Ashton Stone
- Bill Bekele as Tyler James
- Fintan Buckard as Ben Drake
- Savannah Kunyo as Hope Drake

=== Recurring ===
- Hollie-Jay Bowes as Debs Rafferty; School cleaner and Nicky's sister
- Lauren Patel as Jas Sharma; Early career English teacher and Nisha's daughter

=== Guest ===
- Tom Wells as Marc Todd; Maths teacher
- Christine Bottomley as Sam Drake; Stella Drake's daughter
- Katherine Pearce as Amy Spratt; Former Waterloo Road teacher
- Cassie Bradley as Nicole Chester; TV producer
- Kerry Howard as Serena Michelle Davies; chief executive officer of Lowry Community Academies Trust
- William Fox as Pete Weever; Schuey and Portia's father
- Sia Kiwa as Lisa Jackson; Dwayne and Zain's mother
- Denise Black as Mo McManus; Noel's grandmother
- Francesco Piacentini-Smith as Dean Weever' Schuey and Portia's cousin and a former Waterloo Road Student

== Episodes ==
No. in series	Title	Directed by	Written by	Original release date	UK viewers (millions)
239	Episode 1	Lloyd Eyre-Morgan	Chris Gill	23 September 2025	N/A
Jack, as counsellor, and new media studies Darius Donovan teacher start at Waterloo Road, as do Stella's grandchildren Ben and Hope, who are living with her while their mother is detained in hospital. Nisha flirts with Darius, and steals him away from shadowing Marc to discuss his experiences in the army with her class. The teachers run healthy relationship classes, to a mixed reception from the students. Hope and Ben struggle to adjust to their new environment. The Trust instruct Waterloo Road to tone down any religious expression. In protest, Anges refuses to move from Jack's desk, while Shuey defaces a rainbow walkway, and is joined by Izzy, Ben, and Tyler in challenging the school's hypocrisy. Cat, Lois, Stace, and Aleena argue with them, and they are all punished as a result. Shuey tells Stella about how religion has helped him find a sense of belonging, and she agrees to review the guidelines. Izzy and Cat reconcile over their mutual embarrassment over their fathers. Darius brings drugs to school, but tells Donte they belong to Marc, forcing Stella suspends him pending an investigation. Before leaving, Marc warns Nisha not to trust Darius.
240	Episode 2	Lloyd Eyre-Morgan	Lisa Holdsworth	23 September 2025	N/A
Portia's relationship with Shuey is strained due to her lack of understanding of his newfound Christianity, and she takes it out on Agnes, telling her that he is just using her. Agnes reassures him that she only cares about the person he is now, and not his criminal past. Waterloo Road runs a recruitment drive for new students, so Debs covers for Wendy as Stella's assistant and accidentally shares confidential appraisals with the staff and misses a wine delivery. Forrest, Declan, and Ben steal some of the wine, and Debs and Nicky are reprimanded. A drunken Ben causes a fight in the science class, but it impresses the prospective students. Darius helps out Nisha, who is cold towards him and frustrated at having to take on Marc's workload, but he eventually wins her over. Libby returns to school following her ordeal with Jared, but refuses to speak to Jack and becomes exasperated by the other student's interest in her. After an argument with Aleena, Libby agrees to a session with Jack, and later makes amends, stating that she just wants to be treated normally. Izzy uses Donte's credit card to cope with the grief over her mum's death, plunging him into debt. Although she eventually comes clean, Donte initially blames Ashton, who steals his van and sets it alight to claim the insurance money. Feeling her skills are wasted, Stella decides to send Nicky on a management course.
241	Episode 3	Ruth Carney	Andrea Dewsbury & Liz Lewin	30 September 2025	N/A
Noel fails his mock music exam and worries about his future, so Val and Stace convince Stella to allow him to drop out of sixth form and get a job as an apprentice in the canteen. Stella's daughter Sam cancels a visit to watch Hope perform in assembly, upsetting her and Ben and causing them to argue with Stella, though Jack later encourages her to reconcile with them. Mitch, the new SENCo, begins at Waterloo Road, and makes a connection with Portia and Joe. Jas uses a dating app to make money, not knowing that Dwayne is messaging her on there pretending to be an older man. Nisha realizes that Dwayne has a crush on Jas and tries to let him down gently, but discovers that he has been telling other students that he and Jas are in a relationship. When she talks to him, Dwayne reveals to Jas that he is the one on the app. Disturbed and panicked, Jas asks Nisha for help, and she tells her to delete the account and swear Dwayne to secrecy. As the gossip spirals out of control, Dwayne fights Ashton, who announces his and Jas' relationship to the whole school. Nisha forces Jas to reveal the truth and she is fired. Dwayne opens up to Tonya about his anxieties, but they get into an argument. Believing he has no one to confide in, he tries to contact Jas again, but she has blocked him.
242	Episode 4	Ruth Carney	Yasmeen Khan	30 September 2025	N/A
Ben begins a relationship with Izzy. Shuey and Portia's dad is released from prison, which causes issues with his relationships with Mike and Anges. Egged on by Tyler, he is homophobic towards Mike, who then questions to Joe whether he can continue to foster him. Shuey overhears this, and the three argue, with Shuey stating that he is going to move back in with his dad. Also disgusted by his behaviour, Agnes breaks up with him. Noel has a challenging first day in the kitchen, which ends with an unexpected proposal from Stace. Wendy makes cakes for the Career's Fair, which are labelled for different dietary requirements. Stella arranges for Hope to talk with Darius' tv producer friend Nicole, but she accidentally films them in an intimate moment and blackmails him to stay quiet. After Darius mixes up the cupcakes, Hope, who is allergic to dairy, has an allergic reaction and is taken to hospital, where the doctors are unable to revive her. A distraught Ben and Stella visit Sam to tell her about Hope's death. Darius takes Hope's phone to delete the evidence of his affair, and subtly manipulates Wendy into believing she is to blame. Returning to school to collect Hope's things, Stella breaks down in her office.
243	Episode 5	Jesse Quinones	Daniel Rusteau	7 October 2025	N/A
Ben and Stella struggle to navigate their grief. Serena Michelle covers as head of Waterloo Road and interviews the staff about the events that led to Hope's death, though Stella insists on also being on the panel and openly blames Wendy. Donte shares his experiences following his wife's death, telling her that finding answers won't bring Hope back and that focusing on Ben will help them both move on, while Izzy shares similar sentiments with Ben. Wendy tries to quit but Val stops her. Darius then steers Stella to finding the discarded resignation letter and tell Wendy she accepts. Jack and Serena Michelle share a passionate moment. Coral returns to work on phased return after maternity leave, but finds being away from baby George more difficult than she expected. She also butts heads with Nisha, who is reluctant to pull her weight. Dwayne continues to be teased at school, argues with Ashton, and starts hearing voices during his mock exam, causing him to panic, barricade himself in a classroom, and climb into the ceiling. Jack, and Stella are able to calm him down so he can be taken to hospital where he is told that his mental health crisis was caused by stress. Stella tells Serena Michelle she is returning to work.
244	Episode 6	Angela Griffin	Paul Mousley	7 October 2025	N/A
The students join Amy in fixing up a local community centre, unaware that Shuey has been sleeping in there since leaving Joe and Mike's. Pete has Shuey deal drugs, offering to let him move back home if he does so. Agnes finds out tells Portia, who chastises Schuey for letting their dad draw him into more criminal activity. Overhearing this, Joe and Mike argue about how things ended with him. Joe later confides in Mitch that his relationship with Mike is strained, while Mitch shares about his difficult childhood. Lois and Aleena get high. Noel's nan Mo begins making plans for his engagement party, irritating Stace. She and Mo later reconcile, and she encourages Stace to be honest with Noel about not wanting children. Stace reveals to Noel that she had a child when she was thirteen who she had to give up, which has influenced her decision. Despite his shock, Noel reaffirms their relationship. Cat becomes jealous of Izzy and Ben. Triggered by seeing Dean, Libby is consoled by Amy, who advises her not to let her experiences with him and Jared dictate her future. Pete and his crew attack Mike, but Schuey stands up to them and agrees to move back in with him and Joe, and re-establishes his relationship with Agnes.
245	Episode 7	Michael Lacey	Caroline Mitchell	14 October 2025	N/A
At an AA meeting, Jack confesses that being back in school is triggering his alcoholism. Darius is also in attendance and the two agree to support each other. Wendy has her last day at Waterloo Road. Izzy breaks up with Ben, while Ashton tries to impress Tonya. Due to financial pressures at home, Declan struggles with hunger and collapses, and Joe later finds out that Mitch is giving him money to buy food. When a discussion with Declan’s older brother goes awry, Mitch ends up punching him but Joe takes the blame, causing further issues in his relationship with Mike. Dwayne returns to school and reconciles with Ashton. Stella holds a tree-planting ceremony for Hope where Sam convinces Ben to leave school with her. Realising she is still unwell, he contacts Stella, who finds them and expresses her guilt at Hope’s death, asking Sam to move in with her and Ben so they can repair their relationship and work through their grief together. Jack advises Stella to be wary of hiring Darius as Deputy Head and, in response; Darius leaves whiskey on his desk. Jack confronts him, and tells that he is going to compete with him for the job. After officially fostering Shuey with Mike, Joe sleeps with Mitch.
246	Episode 8	Michael Lacey	Neil Jones & Adam Simpson	14 October 2025	N/A
Jack becomes Deputy Head, and continues his rivalry with Darius. Joe and Mitch continue their affair, but Agnes sees them together and brings her concerns to Shuey, who flips out at Joe when he tries to keep him from telling Mike. Joe later confesses his affair to Mike, and breaks up with him. Darius tells Stella about Jack's addiction, but she brushes him off. Waterloo Road hosts a funfair for the end of term. After speaking to Ben, Stella reaches out to Wendy and reconciles, offering her old job back. Noel encourages Stace to reach out to her daughter. Dwayne and Zain's mum gets a new job and they move away. Donte finds some empty bottles in Jack's car, but he assures him it was just a blip. Seeing a video Portia makes about Hope, Nicole realises the truth about Hope's death and confronts Darius. Their conversation is overheard by Jack, but Darius taunts him to the point where Jack punches him. Jack tells Stella about Darius, but Donte tells her he has been drinking and he is fired. Stella then offers Darius the job as Deputy.
