= List of Waterloo Road characters =

This article lists the characters and the actors who portray them from the BBC television series Waterloo Road. The series utilises an ensemble cast, led by the staff members of the eponymous school. It also has a high turnover rate of characters, with staff and students joining and leaving the school over time.

== Main characters ==
=== Senior Management Team ===
Series	Episodes	Headteacher	Deputy Head(s)			Head of Pastoral Care	Executive Head
1	1–8	Jack Rimmer	Andrew Treneman			Kim Campbell	
2	1–12	Jack Rimmer	Andrew Treneman			Kim Campbell	
3	1–6	Jack Rimmer	Eddie Lawson			Steph Haydock	
3	7–10	Rachel Mason	Eddie Lawson			Steph Haydock	
3	11–20	Rachel Mason	Eddie Lawson			Tom Clarkson	
4	1–9	Rachel Mason	Eddie Lawson			Tom Clarkson	
4	10	Rachel Mason	Eddie Lawson				
4	11–20	Rachel Mason	Eddie Lawson			Kim Campbell	
5	1–10	Rachel Mason	Christopher Mead			Kim Campbell	Max Tyler
5	11–20	Rachel Mason	Christopher Mead			Kim Campbell	
6	1–10	Karen Fisher	Christopher Mead				
6	11–20	Karen Fisher	Christopher Mead			Adanna Lawal	
7	1–10	Karen Fisher	Christopher Mead				
7	11–30	Michael Byrne	Sian Diamond		Tom Clarkson		
8	1–19	Michael Byrne	Sian Diamond		Tom Clarkson		
8	20	Michael Byrne			Tom Clarkson		
8	21–28	Michael Byrne	Nikki Boston		Tom Clarkson		
8	29–30	Christine Mulgrew	Simon Lowsley		Tom Clarkson		
9	1–2	Christine Mulgrew	Simon Lowsley				
9	3–18	Christine Mulgrew	Simon Lowsley		George Windsor		
9	19–20	Christine Mulgrew	Simon Lowsley				
10	1–9	Vaughan Fitzgerald	Simon Lowsley				
10	10	Vaughan Fitzgerald					
10	11–20	Vaughan Fitzgerald	Lorna Hutchinson				
11	1–7	Kim Campbell	Lindon King		Joe Casey		
12	1–7	Kim Campbell	Lindon King		Joe Casey		
13	1–8	Kim Campbell	Lindon King		Joe Casey		
14	1–2	Steve Savage			Joe Casey		
14	3–8	Steve Savage	Coral Walker		Joe Casey		
15	1–8	Stella Drake	Coral Walker		Joe Casey		
16	1–7	Stella Drake	Coral Walker		Joe Casey		
16	8	Stella Drake	Jack Rimmer		Joe Casey		
17	1–8	Stella Drake	Darius Donovan	Nisha Chandra	Joe Casey		

=== Staff ===
==== Introduced in series 1 ====
- Jack Rimmer (Jason Merrells, series 1−3, 15–) (Note: Credited only when appearing in series 17.) is the headteacher of Waterloo Road from the start of the series, who initially assumes the position in an acting capacity after his predecessor's public breakdown. His efforts to turn the school around face various challenges, and his confrontational style causes consternation. He has romantic liaisons with Steph Haydock and LEA inspector Heather Davenport, and a more serious relationship with Davina Shackleton. In series 3, after witnessing Izzie Redpath's death he finds it increasingly difficult to cope with the pressures of running the school, and resigns with immediate effect after being reprimanded for financial mismanagement. He briefly returns later in series 3 in an attempt to win Davina back, but she chooses to remain with Tom. In series 15 Jack returns as a counsellor, having left teaching in the intervening years. After becoming his client, Stella Drake offers Jack a job leading the school's renewed pastoral care provision. After a chance meeting with Darius Donovan at an addiction support group, Jack suggests to Stella that Darius may not be ready for more responsibility. Jack accepts the Deputy Head position to prevent Darius from being promoted, but starts drinking again to cope. He discovers that Darius is covering up his part in Stella's granddaughter's death, and punches Darius. With his drinking uncovered, his accusations against Darius go unheard and he is forced to leave the school. He later returns after entering recovery, makes amends with Stella and helps to uncover Darius's criminal activity. In series 18, he rejoins the staff as an English teacher.
- Kim Campbell (Angela Griffin, series 1−2, 4−5, 11–13; featured series 14) is an Art teacher, who is Head of Pastoral Care at the series' start and Headteacher between series 11 and 13. She enjoys the unwavering support of Jack Rimmer, which helps her overcome the trauma of an attempted sexual assault by a pupil. Following a slow-burning flirtation with Andrew Treneman she decides to join him in Rwanda, but returns to Rochdale and her old job during series 4. Her return is tainted by the revelation that her baby daughter was illegally adopted. She subsequently falls into an ill-fated relationship with Max Tyler, from which she falls pregnant, and leaves the school following the birth of her son, Dexter. Off-screen, after Dexter dies Kim refocuses her career and ultimately becomes Headteacher of William Beswick High School. In series 11, she champions William Beswick's change of name to Waterloo Road following a protest by the pupils. She is hit hard by the arrest of pupil Danny Lewis for knife crime, and his later death on school grounds, but finds solace in her reunion with Andrew. She shepherds the school's entry into the academy trust run by Andrew and then steps down from her role, initially with a view to replacing an unwell Andrew as the trust CEO, though this does not transpire. She returns in series 14 and helps to uncover the truth around pupil Boz Osbourne's death, by which time she has married Andrew and become pregnant.
- Stephanie "Steph" Haydock (Denise Welch, series 1−5, 17; guest series 6) is a long-standing French teacher of questionable ability, who takes over as Head of Pastoral Care in series 3 following Kim Campbell's departure. Rachel Mason later removes her from this position in favour of Tom Clarkson and Steph is briefly made Finance Director, before being removed from that role as well for using false misconduct allegations to gather funds for the school. She is also the guardian of Maxine Barlow between series 2 and 4. In series 17, Steph returns as a cover teacher.
- Izzie Redpath (Jill Halfpenny, series 1−2) is the Head of Drama and an English teacher, and a single mother to Chlo and Mika Grainger. After her affair with Tom Clarkson is discovered the couple begin living together, until she ends the relationship after Tom is falsely accused of romantic involvement with a pupil. Tom and Izzie reunite after Lorna's suicide, but soon after she is stabbed and killed when intervening in an attack on Jack Rimmer in the school playground.
- Tom Clarkson (Jason Done, series 1−8) is an English teacher, who also serves periods as Head of Pastoral Care and Deputy Head. Tom marries Lorna Dickey in the series' first episode, but kisses Izzie Redpath on the same day and is caught between the two women afterwards. After both Lorna and Izzie die, Tom is left as guardian to Izzie's daughters, and blames Jack for her murder. He later enjoys a relationship with Davina Shackleton but soon becomes a parental figure for the Kelly family after becoming romantically involved with their mother, Rose Kelly, and in series 5 learns of the existence of his teenage son, Josh Stevenson, who comes out as gay soon after. He also later indulges in brief romances with Cesca Montoya and Eleanor Chaudry. Professionally, Tom is initially seen as popular but unambitious, but takes to the role of Head of Pastoral Care in series 3. Although he steps down after Maxine Barlow's murder by another pupil, he receives further promotions to Head of English in series 5 and Deputy Headteacher in series 7. After learning of Josh's diagnosis of schizophrenia, Tom makes the decision for them to join the re-opened Waterloo Road in Scotland. He agrees to donate one of his kidneys to Grantly Budgen, but before he can do so is killed in a fall from the school's roof while aiding a troubled former pupil.
- Lorna Dickey (Camilla Power, series 1−2), also Lorna Clarkson, is an English teacher and Tom Clarkson's wife, until his affair with Izzie Redpath is discovered. Known for her erratic and manipulative behaviour, Lorna is eventually diagnosed with multiple sclerosis and makes her peace with Tom and Izzie before committing suicide. She also has a brief relationship with Andrew in series 2.
- Andrew Treneman (Jamie Glover, series 1−2, 12−13; guest series 4, 14) (Note: Credited only when appearing in series 12 and 13.) is the Deputy Head of Waterloo Road, hired by Jack Rimmer in the series' first episode. Passionate but unfamiliar with the challenges of an inner-city comprehensive, Andrew's ideas lead him into conflict with Kim Campbell. He briefly becomes Headteacher in series 2, but finds he is unsuited to the position and returns to working under Jack's leadership. After securing a position in a Rwandan school and resigning from Waterloo Road, he declares his feelings for Kim and asks her to come with him. In series 4, he returns out of concern for Kim in the aftermath of her false adoption. They eventually reunite, and Andrew misses his return flight to stay with her. However, he returns to Rwanda off-screen and is not seen again until series 12 when he approaches the new Waterloo Road to assist with a knife crime initiative, desiring to resume contact with Kim. In series 13 Andrew is the CEO of the Lowry Community Academies Trust, which Waterloo Road ultimately joins. After resuming his relationship with Kim, she supports him through his treatment for bowel cancer and Andrew proposes to Kim at the end of series 13.

==== Introduced in series 3 ====
- Davina Shackleton (Christine Tremarco, series 3−4; supporting series 2) is a Teaching Assistant, who initially comes to Waterloo Road as school secretary. After being seconded to the school by investor Roger Aspinall, she learns she had a one-night stand with his teenage son Brett. She also begins a relationship with Jack, later supporting him through his trauma after Izzie's death. At the school, her experience assisting Asperger syndrome pupil Karla Bentham encourages her to become a teacher. She pursues a relationship with Tom Clarkson, but leaves after realising his growing closeness to Rose Kelly.
- Jasmine Koreshi (Shabana Bakhsh, series 3−4) is a newly qualified English teacher. She often butts heads with her Head of Department Grantly Budgen as he doesn't think she's up to the job, but she later earns his respect and he supports her as her union representative when school bully Michaela White falsely accuses Jasmine of hitting her. As a result of these allegations Jasmine is temporarily suspended but returns to the school when the truth comes out. She is also close friends with Davina Shackleton and Matt Wilding. In series 4 she develops a relationship with Head of PE Rob Cleaver, but breaks up with him after he is suspended for giving Bolton Smilie performance-enhancing drugs.
- Matthew "Matt" Wilding (Chris Geere, series 3−4, 7) is the Head of Music and Drama. Matt is popular with students and staff, but initially hides his homosexuality before slowly becoming more confident. He is also the foster carer for Sambuca Kelly when she is temporarily removed from the family home. After a period in the private sector, Michael Byrne tempts him back to Waterloo Road in series 7, where he successfully builds an unconventional orchestra. During this time, he arranges to have a baby with his friend Rosie. His daughter is born prematurely after an incident at the school, and Matt declines the offer to move to Scotland to remain close to her.
- Grantly Budgen (Philip Martin Brown, series 3−9; supporting series 1−2) is the longest-serving teacher in the school, and Head of English between series 1 and 4. Curmudgeonly and cynical, Grantly frequently voices objections to the school's management and acts as the staff's union representative. Although known to be lazy in the classroom, over time his dedication to the school becomes apparent. He is also devoted to his wife Fleur until her death in series 7, after which he begins a relationship with Maggie Croft and agrees to join her to run the school house in Scotland. He then develops kidney failure and spends a number of weeks in a coma before returning home to convalesce. On his return to the school, he learns a new kidney donor has been found for him but dies before the operation can take place.
- Eddie Lawson (Neil Morrissey, series 3−4) is the Deputy Head of Waterloo Road, taking over from Andrew Treneman. Shortly after his arrival, Jack Rimmer resigns and Eddie is disappointed that Rachel Mason is appointed Headteacher over himself. Despite a difficult start, Eddie quickly develops a strong loyalty to Rachel and stands by her when her past is revealed. In series 4 he begins a relationship with Melissa Ryan, Rachel's sister, unaware that she is already married. He later develops feelings for Rachel, but their burgeoning romance ends when Melissa returns pregnant with Eddie's baby. Eddie leaves the school, feeling it would be too difficult to continue working alongside Rachel.
- Rachel Mason (Eva Pope, series 3−5), born Amanda Fenshaw, is the second Headteacher of Waterloo Road. Arriving in the wake of Jack Rimmer's sudden resignation, she makes an uncompromisingly ambitious start but soon wins the support of her staff. However, she is confronted by prospective developer Stuart Hordley, who threatens to expose her true identity and criminal past. The blackmail ends when Eddie Lawson learns the truth, although Rachel is seriously injured in the fire that engulfs the school shortly after and subsequently suffers from post-traumatic stress. In series 5, she oversees the merger with John Fosters but quickly begins to feel undermined by Executive Head Max Tyler. After Max is eventually forced out, Rachel settles back into her role and enjoys the romantic attentions of Adam Fleet, the new Healthy Schools Co-ordinator. Although their relationship progresses quickly to an engagement, Rachel struggles to separate her work and personal life and decides to leave the school after marrying Adam.

==== Introduced in series 4 ====
- Rob Cleaver (Elyes Gabel, series 4) is the Head of PE. He starts a relationship with Jasmine Koreshi and trains Bolton Smilie as a boxer, but loses his job after encouraging Bolton to take drugs to aid his performance.

==== Introduced in series 5 ====
- Max Tyler (Tom Chambers, series 5) is the school's Executive Head, overseeing a group of schools in the Rochdale area after being promoted from his role as Headteacher of John Fosters. He soon becomes suspicious of Rachel Mason's running of Waterloo Road and decides to base himself there permanently, while also beginning an extra-marital relationship with Kim Campbell. His attempts to force Rachel out are eventually exposed, and he leaves the school in disgrace.
- Christopher Mead (William Ash, series 5−7) is the Deputy Head under Rachel Mason and Karen Fisher. Previously the Deputy Head of John Fosters, his loyalty is caught between Max Tyler and Rachel before he realises the extent of Max's deceptions. Despite a brief romantic liaison with Rachel he begins a relationship with Kim during her pregnancy, but she leaves him after the birth of her son. His working relationship with Karen begins positively, until he realises he has had sex with her teenage daughter. Karen allows him to stay after learning the truth. In series 7 his actions in defence of the pupils become increasingly extreme, especially after Scout arrives at the school. He is suspended when he hides a bag of cannabis for Scout, and later allows her to stay at his house. Realising that teaching does not allow him to do enough to help young people, he decides on a change of career.
- Ruby Fry (Elizabeth Berrington, series 5−6) is the Head of Food Technology. Transferred from John Fosters, she resents the school merger and the class of pupil she now has to teach. Subsequently, she faces financial difficulties, splits up with her husband John and struggles with her mental health, becoming jealous of Rachel Mason's imminent wedding. In Series 6 she reunites with John and they attempt to start a family, but struggle to conceive. Ruby arranges to buy Janeece Bryant's baby from her and initially resists when Janeece decides to reclaim her daughter. She resigns at the end of series 6 to pursue a career as an author.
- Helen Hopewell (Vinette Robinson, series 5) is a newly qualified English teacher, who is highly unsuited to the profession and was only able to qualify because of her affair with Max Tyler. She eventually leaves the school after it is revealed she paid student Amy Porter to keep the class quiet during her first inspection.
- Jo Lipsett (Sarah-Jane Potts, series 5) is the Head of Modern Languages, who comes to the school as part of the merger with John Fosters. Her arrival makes Steph Haydock fear for her position, and she unsuccessfully tries to seduce Jo to win her favour. Later, Jo begins to mentor pupil Ros McCain, unaware that she has become infatuated with her until Ros attempts to kiss her.

==== Introduced in series 6 ====
- Karen Fisher (Amanda Burton, series 6−7) is the third Headteacher of Waterloo Road. The school is her first job since the disappearance of her elder daughter, Bex. Karen is proud and sometimes distant, especially towards her family, but softens over time. As well as Bex's disappearance, Karen deals with her wayward younger daughter Jess, bulimic son Harry and unfaithful husband Charlie. She is delighted when Bex returns home, but continues to struggle to talk about her time away. In series 7, Karen begins a relationship with Site Manager Rob Scotcher, which is complicated by the return of his wife and his son, Aiden, cheating on Jess. She faces a vendetta from teacher Eleanor Chaudry and Director of Education Richard Whitman, leaving the school facing closure. While a demonstration of support from staff and pupils allows Waterloo Road to remain open, Karen is dismissed.
- Charlie Fisher (Ian Puleston-Davies, series 6) is a supply teacher at Waterloo Road and Karen Fisher's husband. The Fishers separate after Charlie's affair with Maria Lucas is uncovered and he later moves to London with her.
- Francesca "Cesca" Montoya (Karen David, series 6) is the Head of Spanish. She butts heads with Karen Fisher when she reveals she knew about her husband Charlie's affair. She begins an affair with pupil Jonah Kirby, who she later marries, being arrested and losing her job as a result.
- Janeece Bryant (Chelsee Healey, series 6−8, 18–; supporting series 1−4; guest series 11) (Note: Also stars in Waterloo Road Reunited.) is a pupil at Waterloo Road who returns as the school secretary. Janeece is pregnant upon her return to the school, but struggles with the idea of motherhood and agrees to sell her baby to Ruby Fry. She soon regrets her decision and reclaims her daughter, who she calls Cheryl. In series 7, Janeece is conned by a false engagement and depends on the school for support. She is delighted when Michael Byrne offers her the secretary's job at the school in Scotland. Soon after, however, she decides to move on after beginning to neglect Cheryl.
- Marcus Kirby (Wil Johnson, series 6) is a Geography teacher and father of Jonah and Ruth Kirby. He protests bitterly at his children attending Waterloo Road, having previously home schooled them, and takes Ruth's disappearance as confirmation of his doubts. After Ruth is found, Karen offers him a job but he resigns after Christopher's sexual relations with Jess Fisher, the girlfriend of Marcus's son Jonah, are revealed.
- Adanna Lawal (Sharlene Whyte, series 6) is the Head of Pastoral Care. She is argumentative and confrontational, immediately opposing Karen's single-sex teaching initiative and rallying support from the staff.

==== Introduced in series 7 ====
- Rob Scotcher (Robson Green, series 7) is Waterloo Road's Site Manager and the father of Aiden Scotcher. Rob quickly strikes a rapport with Karen Fisher, and also boosts the morale of the struggling Daniel Chalk. He begins dating Karen, but agrees to take back his wife, Naomi, for the sake of Aiden. He eventually reunites with Karen, and also qualifies as a teacher.
- Daniel "Chalky" Chalk (Mark Benton, series 7−8; guest series 9) is a Maths teacher. Seeing Waterloo Road as his last chance to make a success of his career, he initially struggles greatly but slowly finds his feet. He develops a crush on Janeece Bryant, who takes advantage of his fondness, but has better luck with Linda Radleigh until he realises that she is Michael Byrne's stalker. He later use his initiative to lead the school's response to a gang problem. After moving to Scotland, Chalky decides to become a foster carer and takes in pupil Kevin Skelton. The arrangement quickly becomes tense, but when Chalky opens up about abuse he suffered in the past they become close. Soon after, Chalky gets to opportunity to work in London as a games designer.
- Eleanor Chaudry (Poppy Jhakra, series 7) is an English teacher with traditional beliefs and a high level of self-belief, who quickly comes to resent Karen Fisher's leadership and conspires to remove her from the school.
- Michael Byrne (Alec Newman, series 7−8) is the Headteacher of Waterloo Road in both Rochdale and Scotland. A so-called "super Head", he is appointed with a mandate to reverse the school's fortunes but struggles with trauma after being stabbed at his last school. He appoints his former partner, Sian Diamond, as Deputy Headteacher along with Tom Clarkson, and soon begins an affair with her. He is also stalked by Linda Radleigh, who runs him down with her car. Despite overcoming his setbacks, he does not do enough to keep the school open, though after an offer from his former pupil Lorraine Donnegan he makes plans to re-open Waterloo Road in Scotland. In series 8, Michael reunites with his terminally ill father and allows him to die, facing a court case in the aftermath. He also begins a relationship with Christine Mulgrew. Following Sian's departure, tensions between Michael and Lorraine over the running of the school increase. Michael briefly resigns, before plotting to sell the school to the local authority. After realising the deal will not allow him the active role he desires, Michael steps down once more and recommends Christine as his replacement.
- Sian Diamond (Jaye Jacobs, series 7−8) is a Deputy Headteacher under Michael Byrne. A highly competent and popular teacher, Sian is loyal to Michael even after their affair ends and is the first staff member to agree to move to Scotland with the school. In Series 8, she helps Michael make peace with his father but is furious at his involvement in his death. Sian is made responsible for Barry Barry after he arrives with his troublesome family and initially ignores his inappropriate comments, but after Barry steals an item of her underwear she impulsively strikes him. Despite the support of Michael and the students who witnessed the incident, Sian is horrified by her actions and immediately resigns.
- Jeremy "Jez" Diamond (Alex Walkinshaw, series 7) is the Head of PE and Sian Diamond's husband. Jez is an ex-professional footballer with a vain streak. Happy to begin his new life with Sian, he is surprised when his ex-wife leaves his two children, Madi and Zack, with him, and struggles with his stubborn daughter and anxious son. He is furious to discover Sian's affair with Michael, but they agree to give their marriage another go. However, after Sian secretly sabotages his plan to try for a baby they decide to separate and Jez leaves the school.
- Linda Radleigh (Sarah Hadland, series 7) is the Head of English, who harbours a long-standing obsession with Michael Byrne and is exposed as his stalker.
- Nikki Boston (Heather Peace, series 7−9) is an English teacher who holds a variety of positions in both iterations of Waterloo Road. Appointed as Head of English after Linda Radleigh's arrest, Nikki's army-trained disciplinary style comes as a surprise to the school. She helps Josh Stevenson overcome his cannabis addiction, and supports Tom Clarkson after Josh is diagnosed with schizophrenia. Although she doesn't initially take a position in the Scotland school, she returns to lead its newly established Pupil Referral Unit. Lorraine Donnegan, who she begins a romantic relationship with, offers her the role of Deputy Headteacher following Sian Diamond's departure, causing friction with Michael. She is then briefly made Headteacher after Michael Byrne resigns, but realises she is unsuited to the role. In series 9, she becomes heavily invested in mentoring Kacey Barry's boxing career, even offering her own money to send her to a training camp in America. She is also surprised by the arrival of her estranged daughter, Eve, who she gave up as a baby. Her relationship with Sue Spark's sister, Vix, is disrupted by Nikki's brief affair with Hector Reid, but they eventually reunite and move to Berlin together.

==== Introduced in series 8 ====
- Christine Mulgrew (Laurie Brett, series 8−10) is an English teacher, who is appointed as Headteacher of Waterloo Road towards the end of series 8. Christine is an alcoholic, regularly dependent on her teenage son Connor to take care of her. After discovering Connor is the school's arsonist, Christine realises the impact of her behaviour and gives up alcohol. She begins a relationship with Michael, but is more invested than he is. Christine focuses on advancing her career, applying for a job at Havelock High and covering head of year responsibilities for an unwell Grantly. She is devastated when Michael decides to end their relationship and resign from Waterloo Road, but decides to accept the Acting Headteacher's job for her own sake. Despite her inexperience, Christine makes ambitious plans for the school, with George Windsor's Mandarin programme the cornerstone of her innovations. She also makes George Deputy Head in an effort to curb Simon's attempts to outshine her. Ultimately, the exposure of George as a fraud nearly costs her the permanent headship until Simon decides to endorse her application. Christine is tempted by alcohol on several occasions, but remains sober until after Connor leaves home. Her relapse has devastating consequences, losing Christine her job as Head. Her impassioned appeal and Simon's intervention allow her to continue teaching at the school, and she returns to the classroom in series 10.
- Audrey McFall (Georgie Glen, series 8−10) is a History teacher. Formerly a teacher at Havelock High, she is tempted by Michael's vision for the school and enthusiastically embraces the freedom afforded by Waterloo Road's independent status in series 8. She is supportive of Christine, although her friendly overtures are not always reciprocated. After a trip to Africa Audrey returns with the much younger Ndale Kayuni, causing much gossip in the staff room. They become engaged, but on their wedding day it transpires that Ndale is already married and is also having an affair with Sonya, leaving Audrey heartbroken. In series 9, she attempts to come to the aid of the Brown twins with mixed success, and also proposes a Second World War themed living history day to distract a grieving Maggie. She also advocates for Lula Tsibi to remain in the country.
- Lorraine Donnegan (Daniela Denby-Ashe, series 8; recurring series 7) is Waterloo Road's owner and benefactor during series 8. A former pupil of Michael's turned wealthy businesswoman, Lorraine purchases the school in Scotland and asks Michael to become its Headteacher. Michael initially refuses the offer, but reconsiders when he learns Waterloo Road in Rochdale is to be closed. Despite her philanthropic purposes in establishing the school, Lorraine is prone to vanity and keen to preserve her fortune. She does, however, reluctantly accede when Michael insists on including a schoolhouse for the most at need students, and later establishing an on-site Pupil Referral Unit. Despite her respect for Michael, the two become increasingly at odds over the running of the school, culminating in Lorraine's plan to transition towards a fee-paying structure. Lorraine then decides the situation is unsustainable, announcing the school will re-open as the Lorraine Donnegan Institute for Excellence. With the staff in uproar, Michael finally convinces Lorraine to let the council take over the school. After leaving, she continues to fund the schoolhouse.
- Maggie Budgen (Melanie Hill, series 8−10; supporting series 7), also Maggie Croft, is the Housemistress in Scotland and later a Home Economics Teacher, who is also the senior canteen assistant at both of the school's iterations. Maggie sells mail order cosmetics during school hours, which Grantly disapproves of until he sets himself up in competition. They later call a truce and begin working together, and Maggie supports Grantly after the death of his wife. They become romantically involved soon after, and Grantly proposes on the journey to Scotland. Maggie thrives at the schoolhouse, coming to see the children under her care as her own family. When Grantly suffers kidney failure, she begs the staff to consider becoming a donor and is delighted when Tom agrees. She also begins teaching when a strike leaves the school understaffed. In series 9, she supports Grantly's return to school and is devastated when he dies. She finds support in Connor Mulgrew, who she helps in his aspiration to become a chef.
- Sonya Donnegan (Victoria Bush, series 8−10) is hired as Michael's PA, continuing as school secretary following his departure. She is also Lorraine's sister, although the two are different in all respects. Sonya is absent-minded but highly loyal to the school.
- George Windsor (Angus Deayton, series 8−10) is the Head of Modern Languages, and a Deputy Head under Christine. George first comes to the school as supply during a strike, and Christine's first act as Head is to appoint him to the staff permanently. Despite being old friends with Christine, George struggles to understand her personal issues and often casually offers her alcohol. He antagonises both Nikki and Simon, calling the latter "Mr Lousy". George is married to Princess, who he met in her native China, and he requests she is hired as a Mandarin Teaching Assistant to cover up his own failings in the language. Princess soon becomes dissatisfied with the situation and leaves him, after which Christine demands that George takes night classes in Mandarin. The situation is eventually exposed, leaving George to return to teaching French and Spanish. Later in series 9, he begins a relationship with Carol Barry that ends after a disastrous cruise holiday. Christine removes him as Deputy Head after he neglects his duties when left in charge of the school. He resigns from Waterloo Road after taking an instant dislike to Vaughan in series 10, but later returns with news that the council intends to merge the school with Havelock High. He uses this information as leverage to be reappointed onto the staff.
- Simon Lowsley (Richard Mylan, series 8−10) is the Deputy Head of Waterloo Road. Appointed as part of the council's takeover of the school, Simon's arrival surprises Christine at the end of her first day as Head and prevents her from retaining Nikki as a Deputy. Highly ambitious, Simon threatens to outshine Christine and applies for the Headteacher position with the encouragement of Head of Education Robert Bain, his future father-in-law. He initially hides his engagement to Sue from Christine, and then attempts to cover up her difficulties in the classroom, but stops making excuses for her when her negligence puts a pupil in danger. After seeing Christine open up about her alcoholism to help a struggling mother and son, Simon withdraws his application for the Head's position and supports Christine thereafter, including during her relapse. He continues as Deputy under Vaughan Fitzgerald, though his efforts to impress the new Head are not well received. He leaves the school when Sue's affair with Hector is exposed, after attacking the latter in a fit of rage.

==== Introduced in series 9 ====
- Sue Lowsley (née Spark; Vanessa Hehir, series 9−10) is a Science teacher and Simon's wife. A former flight attendant, Sue struggles to maintain order in the classroom and is more interested in her relationship with Simon than teaching.
- Hector Reid (Leon Ockenden, series 9−10) is a PE teacher, who comes to Waterloo Road as part of its resilience programme. Unconventional and arrogant, Hector initially sets his sights on Nikki but later begins an affair with Sue.

==== Introduced in series 10 ====
- Vaughan Fitzgerald (Neil Pearson, series 10) is the sixth Headteacher of Waterloo Road. Initially distracted by the difficulties of his home life with Allie, he later puts his energies into fighting the merger with Havelock High.
- Allie Westbrook (Nicola Stephenson, series 10) is an Art teacher and Vaughan's partner. She attempts to make living arrangements work between her children and Vaughan's, but the relationship comes under strain when Vaughan's son, Justin, begins a relationship with Allie's daughter, Tiffany. Vaughan and Allie's relationship finally ends after Justin assaults her; Allie also leaves Waterloo Road in the wake of the incident.
- Lorna Hutchinson (Laura Aikman, series 10) is the Deputy Headteacher of Waterloo Road, appointed following Simon's departure. Lorna tutors the illiterate Kenzie Calhoun out of lessons and quickly becomes a popular figure in the school, despite some competitiveness with Christine Mulgrew. It later emerges that she has escaped an abusive marriage.
- Olga Fitzgerald (Pooky Quesnel, series 10) is a Geography teacher and Vaughan's ex-wife. Olga is first seen as a patient in a psychiatric care facility, having suffered a breakdown after Vaughan left her for Allie. Following her recovery she is assigned to Waterloo Road as a supply teacher, where she causes friction with Vaughan but otherwise impresses. After she advocates for Kevin Chalk's transferral to Havelock High, Vaughan offers her a permanent position at the school.
- Guy Braxton (Regé-Jean Page, series 10) is a trainee teacher in Graphics & Product Design, who comes to Waterloo Road through the Teach Direct programme. Guy's position is threatened by the discovery of an apparent relationship with pupil Carrie Norton, until it is revealed that she is his estranged sister. Guy attempts to live at the school until George offers him a place to stay. He later moves in with Sonya, and supports her through her cancer scare.
- Marco D'Olivera (Stefano Braschi, series 10) is a newly qualified teacher in Science. Transferring from a career in industry, Marco's didactic style is challenged by the realities of teaching. Lorna acts as his mentor in the school, and an attraction develops between them.

==== Introduced in series 11 ====
- Joe Casey (James Baxter, series 11–), Deputy Head and Languages teacher. He is married to police officer Mike Rutherford and together they adopted Waterloo Road students Dwayne and Zayne Jackson. Joe is popular with the pupils, but at times struggles to be taken seriously. He briefly takes over from Kim as Headteacher, but finds himself unsuited to the position and is replaced by Steve Savage. Joe is uncomfortable with Steve's maverick tendencies, but ultimately finds his place in the school again. In series 15, Joe and Mike foster Schuey Weever. After growing distant from Mike, Joe starts an affair with Mitch Swift, which results in the end of his marriage.
- Wendy Whitwell (Jo Coffey, series 11–), Headteacher's PA. She helps to look after Danny Lewis's dog Angel after he moves to a hostel and is unable to take her with him. Wendy's position leaves her privy to a range of personal information, and she becomes aware of Kim and Andrew's relationship before anyone else. Wendy is blamed by Stella for the death of her granddaughter, Hope, on school grounds, and engineers Wendy's departure from Waterloo Road, but ultimately relents and offers her job back.
- Neil Guthrie (Neil Fitzmaurice, series 11–), History teacher. He opposes the school's rebranding after complaints from students about William Beswick High's namesake being a slave owner. He and Donte bond over their bereavement but Neil later reveals that his wife is not dead and she in fact left him for his best friend, taking their daughters with her. He pretended that he lost his wife because it was less humiliating than admitting she left him. In series 13 he begins a relationship with Coral Walker and is reunited with his daughter, Libby. Libby manipulates Neil's fear of losing her again, but Coral eventually persuades him to act as her father. Neil's younger daughter, Cat, also returns from New Zealand in series 15.
- Lindon King (Vincent Jerome, series 11–13), Deputy Head and Science teacher. He separates from his wife Hannah over his work-life balance and has a brief relationship with Kim. After accidentally informing Erica Thorn about Donte's outburst and Danny Lewis's arrest, Erica offers Lindon the job in Kim's place but he says he doesn't have what it takes to lead a school like Waterloo Road High. He is also coach of the school basketball team. Lindon leaves Waterloo Road following the school joining the academy trust.
- Coral Walker (Rachel Leskovac, series 11–), (Note: Credited only when appearing in series 16 and 17.) Head of English, and Deputy Head from series 14. She has Obsessive Compulsive Disorder and takes hygiene very seriously. On the first day of term she bumps into a car which hits Chlo Charles. Though she is cleared of wrongdoing, she feels guilty when Chlo dies unexpectedly the same day as the incident. The police inquest rules that there was no single identifiable cause for her death but Coral still can't get over it. At the end of term she tells Kim that she doesn't want to return and Donte suggests she run the charity in Chlo's honour. She begins a relationship with Neil Guthrie and helps him negotiate his relationship with his daughter, Libby. After becoming Deputy Head, she leads the integration of deaf pupils from a nearby school that is closed, and comes to terms with her estrangement from her deaf cousin. In series 15, Coral unexpectedly becomes pregnant and gives birth to a son, George. Upon her return from maternity leave she struggles with her competing demands, and chooses to step aside from the Deputy Head role until she feels more ready.
- Nicky Walters (Kym Marsh, series 11–17), school canteen worker and mother to Preston and Tonya. The family's world is thrown upside down when Nicky is evicted for repeated late rent payments and they are forced to stay with her sister Debs. She later moves in with Donte, with whom she is in a relationship in series 13 and 14. In series 16, she leaves the school temporarily to undergo a management training course, returning on a Behavioural Lead placement the following term. She helps to expose her ex-husband's grooming of a student, and then accepts a position at a nearby school.
- Amy Spratt (Katherine Pearce, series 11–15; guest series 16), an early career teacher in English. She is constantly put down by Coral, her head of department, for being too friendly with the students and not punishing them enough. At a workshop she shouts at Kelly Jo Rafferty which causes her to have an outburst and break a window. Amy calms Kelly Jo down and apologises for being harsh, later suggesting that Kelly Jo might have ADHD. Stella fires her after she becomes convinced that Libby Guthrie is being abused by her boyfriend, and Amy declines the offer to take back her job, disillusioned by the increasingly bureaucratic nature of the school.
- Valerie Chambers (Shauna Shim, series 11–), Music teacher. She takes in homeless student Danny Lewis after he is threatened in his hostel and gifts him a guitar to nurture his musical talents. She is distraught when he is arrested for stabbing his mother's boyfriend and hides the knife Danny used in her classroom. She clashes with Steve Savage's academic focus as Headteacher and resigns, but the two eventually come to an agreement.
- Donte Charles (Adam Thomas, series 11–; supporting series 1−4), the school's caretaker and a former pupil. After his wife Chlo's unexpected death he falls into a depression and breaks down while giving his funeral speech. He takes on the caretaker job to be closer to his daughter Izzy. When Coral admits her role in Chlo's car accident Donte smashes her car with his tools and is made to take anger management classes in order to keep his job. He sets up a charity in Chlo's name at the end of the term and asks Coral to run it. Donte becomes a PE teacher from series 14. In series 15 he learns he fathered a son, Ashton Stone, with Celine Dixon during the events of series 3.

==== Introduced in series 12 ====
- Mike Rutherford (Ryan Clayton, series 12–13, 16; featured series 17; guest series 11; recurring series 14–15), the school's on-site police liaison officer and Joe's partner. Mike and Joe foster two boys who attend Waterloo Road, Dwayne and Zayne Jackson. In series 13 Mike is suspended after pupil Shola Aku fantasises of a relationship between them, but he is later cleared of all wrongdoing and returns to his position at the school. When the school moves location in series 14 Mike is no longer based on-site, but remains its police liaison and assists in the investigation around Boz Osbourne's death. In series 16, he allows Schuey to move out after he expresses homophobia towards him. When Schuey refuses to be goaded into attacking him by the Weever family, their relationship heals, and Joe and Mike arrange to foster Schuey again. After Joe and Mike's marriage breaks down, Mike continues with Schuey's fostering alone.

==== Introduced in series 14 ====
- Steven "Steve" Savage (Jason Manford, series 14) is the eighth Headteacher of Waterloo Road. Following Joe's resignation from the Headteacher position, Steve is appointed from the academy trust Waterloo Road recently joined. Steve is a charismatic Headteacher who, due to his upbringing in care, adopts a "no kid gets left behind" attitude to education. He was also in a relationship with Nicky as a teenager. He is a solo parent to Billy Savage since his wife died, and moves him to Waterloo Road. When Billy causes the death of pupil Boz Osbourne, Steve covers up the death and is ultimately arrested for the crime.
- Nisha Chandra (Saira Choudhry, series 14–), Head of Maths. Nisha puts minimal effort into teaching, but agrees to help Donte with his GCSE study. When her daughter, Jas Sharma, comes to the school as a new teacher they initially keep their relationship a secret, and later learn that Donte has been having sex with them both. She later begins a relationship with Darius Donovan and falls pregnant, but realises his true character and helps to bring about his downfall.

==== Introduced in series 15 ====
- Dame Stella Drake (Lindsey Coulson, series 15–) is the ninth Headteacher of Waterloo Road, who joins the school following Steve's arrest. Stella was previously ranked highly at Ofsted until a social media scandal damaged her reputation, but nevertheless brings an "uncompromising work ethic, strict moral compass and no-nonsense approach" to Waterloo Road. After she is severely attacked on school grounds, Stella gradually softens her approach to the role. She receives counselling from Jack Rimmer, before convincing him to join Waterloo Road. In series 16, she takes over the care of her grandchildren, Ben and Hope, while their mother undergoes psychiatric care. Hope dies from anaphylaxis, and an investigation finds the school partially responsible. Stella continues to rely on Jack's support and appoints him as Deputy Head, but then discovers he is drinking alcohol on the job and fires him.

==== Introduced in series 16 ====
- Darius Donovan (Jon Richardson, series 16–17), media studies teacher and Deputy Head in series 17. Darius has a history of addiction, and shifts the blame onto Marc Todd when his drugs are found on his first day. He continues to manipulate situations to his own benefit, and after a cupcake he gives to pupil Hope Drake causes her death from anaphylaxis, allows Wendy Whitwell to suffer the consequences. After Jack Rimmer undermines his attempts to secure the Deputy Head position, Darius engineers his relapse into alcoholism and discredits Jack's accusations towards him. After firing Jack, Stella offers Darius his position as Deputy Head.
- Mitch Swift (Christopher Jeffers, series 16–), Special Educational Needs Co-ordinator. Mitch is talented and empathetic with the pupils, but shows little regard for protocol. After he begins to give Declan Brown money for food, Declan's brother accuses him of grooming and Mitch punches him in retaliation. Joe covers for him, and the two begin an affair.

==== Introduced in series 18 ====
- Edward Connell (Tashinga Bepete, series 18–), a newly qualified teacher.
- Leah Merchant (Cora Kirk, series 18–), a newly qualified teacher.
- Gemma Tully (Mollie Winnard, series 18–), a newly qualified teacher.

== Supporting characters ==
=== Students ===
==== Introduced in series 1 ====
- Chlo Grainger (Katie Griffiths, series 1−4; guest series 11)
- Mika Grainger (Lauren Drummond, series 1−3; guest series 13)
- Yasmin Deardon (Rhea Bailey, series 1)
- Holly Tattersall (Daisy Wignall, series 1; guest series 2)
- Lewis Seddon (Craig Fitzpatrick, series 1−3), also Canteen Assistant in series 3

==== Introduced in series 2 ====
- Brett Aspinall (Tom Payne, series 2−3)
- Leigh-Ann Galloway (Holly Matthews, series 2)
- Courtney (Rachel Shenton, series 2)
- Celine Dixon (Zeriozha Burt-Skeete, series 2−3; recurring series 15)
- Maxine Barlow (Ellie Paskell, series 2−4)
- Stacey Appleyard (Holly Grainger, series 2)

==== Introduced in series 3 ====
- Karla Bentham (Jessica Baglow, series 3−5)
- Aleesha Dillon (Lauren Thomas, series 3−5)
- Danielle Harker (Lucy Dixon, series 3−5)
- Bolton Smilie (Tachia Newall, series 3−5; guest series 8)
- Damon (Stefan Gumbs, series 3)
- Paul Langley (Thomas Milner, series 3−5)
- Shahid Kapoor (Naveed Choudhry, series 3; guest series 4)
- Dominic Hammond (Joel Goonan, series 3)
- Michaela White (Zaraah Abrahams, series 3−5)

==== Introduced in series 4 ====
- Denzil Kelly (Reece Douglas, series 4−7)
- Earl Kelly (Reece Noi, series 4)
- Marley Kelly (Luke Bailey, series 4)
- Sambuca Kelly (Holly Kenny, series 4−7)
- Felicity "Flick" Mellor (Sadie Pickering, series 4)
- Philip Ryan (Dean Smith, series 4−5)
- Lauren Andrews (Darcy Isa, series 4−7)

==== Introduced in series 5 ====
- Emily James (Shannon Flynn, series 5−7)
- Lindsay James (Jenna-Louise Coleman, series 5)
- Siobhan Mailey (Phoebe Dynevor, series 5)
- Ros McCain (Sophie McShera, series 5)
- Luke Pendle (Richie Jeeves, series 5)
- Amy Porter (Ayesha Gwilt, series 5−7)
- Josh Stevenson (William Rush, series 5−8)
- Finn Sharkey (Jack McMullen, series 5−7)

==== Introduced in series 6 ====
- Ronan Burley (Ben-Ryan Davies, series 6−7)
- Harry Fisher (Ceallach Spellman, series 6−7)
- Jess Fisher (Linzey Cocker, series 6−7)
- Jonah Kirby (Lucien Laviscount, series 6)
- Ruth Kirby (Anna Jobarteh, series 6)
- Vicki MacDonald (Rebecca Ryan, series 6−7; guest series 5)
- Rebecca "Bex" Fisher (Tina O'Brien, series 6)
- Nate Gurney (Scott Haining, series 6)
- Kyle Stack (George Sampson, series 6−7; guest series 8)

==== Introduced in series 7 ====
- Rhona Mansfield (Hope Katana, series 7)
- Shona Mansfield (Millie Katana, series 7)
- Aiden Scotcher (Oliver Lee, series 7)
- Jodie "Scout" Allen (Katie McGlynn, series 7−8)
- Tariq Siddiqui (Naveed Choudhry, series 7−8; guest series 9)
- Trudi Siddiqui (Aryana Ramkhalawon, series 7)
- Phoenix Taylor (Kaya Moore, series 7−8)
- Harley Taylor (Kane Tomlinson-Weaver, series 7−10)
- Madeline "Madi" Diamond (Georgia Henshaw, series 7−8)
- Zack Diamond (Lee Abbate, series 7)
- Naseem Siddiqui (Shifaa Arfann, series 7)

==== Introduced in series 8 ====
- Jade Fleming (Paige Meade, series 8)
- Angus "Gus" Hancock (Benjamin Gur, series 8)
- Connor Mulgrew (Shane O'Meara, series 8−9)
- Imogen Stewart (Kirstie Steele, series 8−9)
- Lula Tsibi (Marlene Madenge, series 8−9)
- Rhiannon Salt (Rebecca Craven, series 8−10)
- Liberty Gordon (Adiza Shardow, series 8)
- Kevin Chalk (Tommy Lawrence Knight, series 8−10)
- Barry Barry (Carl Au, series 8−9)
- Dynasty Barry (Abby Mavers, series 8−9; guest series 10)
- Kacey Barry (Brogan Ellis, series 8−10)
- Jack MacAllister (Taylor Rhys, series 8)

==== Introduced in series 9 ====
- Lenny Brown (Joe Slater, series 9−10)
- Lisa Brown (Caitlin Gillespie, series 9−10)
- Darren Hughes (Mark Beswick, series 9−10)
- Shaznay Montrose (Je'Taime Morgan Hanley, series 9−10)
- Archie Wong (Christopher Chung, series 9)
- Gabriella Wark (Naomi Battrick, series 9−10)

==== Introduced in series 10 ====
- Justin Fitzgerald (Max Bowden, series 10)
- Leo Fitzgerald (Zebb Dempster, series 10)
- Floyd Westbrook (Leo Flanagan, series 10)
- Tiffany Westbrook (Sammy Oliver, series 10)
- Kenzie Calhoun (Charlotte Beaumont, series 10)
- Scott Fairchild (Andrew Still, series 10)
- Carrie Norton (Tahirah Sharif, series 10)
- Bonnie Kincaid (Holly Jack, series 10)
- Dale Jackson (Finlay MacMillan, series 10)
- Abdul Bukhari (Armin Karim, series 10)

==== Introduced in series 11 ====
- Shola Aku (Chiamaka Ulebor, series 11–)
- Samia Choudhry (Priyasasha Kumari, series 11–13; guest series 14)
- Kelly Jo Rafferty (Alicia Forde, series 11–14)
- Kai Sharif (Adam Ali, series 11–13; guest series 14)
- Preston Walters (Noah Valentine, series 11–14)
- Tonya Walters (Summer Violet Bird, series 11–)
- Izzy Charles (Scarlett Thomas, series 11–13, 16–; guest series 15; uncredited series 4)
- Dwayne Jackson (Thapelo Ray, series 11–16)
- Zayne Jackson (Inathi Rozani, series 11–12, 16; guest series 13)
- Dean Weever (Francesco Piacentini-Smith, series 11–13; guest series 14, 16)
- Noel McManus (Liam Scholes, series 11–), also Kitchen Apprentice from series 16
- Danny Lewis (Adam Abbou, series 11–12)
- Verity King (Ava Flannery, series 11–12)
- Caz Williams (Lucy Eleanor Begg, series 11–14; guest series 15)
- Millie Adebayo (Randi Agyare, series 11–14)

==== Introduced in series 12 ====
- Myles Massey (Osian Morgan, series 12)

==== Introduced in series 13 ====
- Schumacher "Schuey" Weever (Zak Sutcliffe, series 13–)
- Stacey "Stace" Neville (Tillie Amartey, series 13–)
- Portia Weever (Maisey Robinson, series 13–)
- Mollie "Mog" Richardson (Aabay Ali, series 13–)
- Jess Clarke (Zanele Nyoni, series 13)
- Libby Guthrie (Hattie Dynevor, series 13–17)

==== Introduced in series 14 ====
- Boz Osbourne (Nathan Wood, series 14)
- Aleena Qureshi (Sonya Nisa, series 14–)
- Lois Taylor-Brown (Miya Ocego, series 14–)
- Billy Savage (Olly Rhodes, series 14; guest series 15)
- Luca Smith (Danny Murphy, series 14–)
- Jared Jones (Matthew Khan, series 14–15)

==== Introduced in series 15 ====
- Ashton Stone (Cory McLane, series 15–)
- Agnes Eccleston (Niamh Blackshaw, series 15–)
- Cat Guthrie (Lucy Chambers, series 15–)

==== Introduced in series 16 ====
- Ben Drake (Fintan Buckard, series 16–)
- Hope Drake (Savannah Kunyo, series 16)
- Declan Brown (Teddy Wallwork, series 16–; guest series 13)
- Tyler James (Bill Bekele, series 16; guest series 15)
- Forest Sumi (Alfie Corbett, series 16–; guest series 14–15)

==== Introduced in series 17 ====
- Freddie Hollister (Freddy Smith, series 17–)
- Leoni Tennant (Olivia Booth-Ford, series 17–)
- Aisha Azzi (Myra-Sofia Iftikhar, series 17–)
- Badr Azzi (Sana Ali, series 17–)
- Harleen Lamba (Isha Kaur, series 17–)

==== Introduced in series 18 ====
- Cheryl Bryant (Lauren Hylton, series 18–; Georgia and Holly Dougdale, recurring series 6; Leyla Ogulyaymis, guest series 8)
- Liam Shaw (Leo Ashton, series 18–)
- Nathan Clark (Callum Broome, series 18–)
- Ibrahim Azzi (Yousef Naseer, series 18–)
- Cane Morris (Lewis Pemberton, series 18–)
- Marshall Clark (Keelan Wright, series 18–)

=== Staff ===
- Estelle Cooper (Judith Barker, series 1), School secretary
- Bridget Morley (Jacqueline Kington, series 3), School secretary and bursar
- Candice Smilie (Kay Purcell, series 3−5), Senior Canteen Assistant and Bolton's mother
- Rose Kelly (Elaine Symons, series 4−5, 7; guest series 6), Canteen Assistant and mother to the Kelly children
- Melissa Ryan (Katy Carmichael, series 4), Head of Extended Services, Philip's mother and Rachel Mason's sister
- Dave Miller (Tim Healy, series 4), Head of Security
- Adam Fleet (Steven Waddington, series 5), Healthy Schools Co-ordinator and later Rachel's husband
- Ndale Kayuni (Richie Campbell, series 8), Maintenance Assistant and Audrey's fiancé
- Esther Fairclough (Daniela Nardini, series 8), Acting Head of Science
- Princess Windsor (Elizabeth Tan, series 9; guest series 8), Mandarin Teaching Assistant and George's wife
- Carol Barry (Zöe Lucker, series 9−10; recurring series 8), Canteen Assistant and mother to the Barry children
- Rolf Higgins (Barrie Greenwood, series 11, 13; guest series 12), caretaker
- Jamilah Omar (Sonia Ibrahim, series 11–13), the school's social worker
- Marc Todd (Tom Wells, series 13–15; guest series 16), Maths teacher
- Debs Rafferty (Hollie-Jay Bowes, series 14–; recurring series 11–13), school cleaner, Kelly Jo's mother and Nicky's sister
- Jas Sharma (Lauren Patel, series 15–16), an early career teacher of English and Nisha's daughter
- Riley Murphy (Jude Mahon, series 17; guest series 14–16), Communication Support Worker.

== Recurring characters ==
- Clarence Charles (Steve Money, series 1; guest series 3–4), Donte's father
- Jimmy Grainger (David Crellin, series 1), Mika and Chlo's father and Izzie's ex-husband
- Heather Davenport (Anna Wilson-Jones, series 1), LEA inspector
- Roger Aspinall (Nick Sidi, series 2), Brett's father, who financially invests in the school and sits on its board of governors
- Helmsley (Mikey North, series 2), a former pupil and part of Lewis Seddon's gang
- Nigel Hinchcliffe (Robert Angell, series 2−3; guest series 1), Head of Governors
- Jerry Preston (Paul Birchard, series 2), a fundamentalist Christian who buys Roger's company
- Jed and Jemma Seddon (Michael Keogh and Kathryn Hunt, series 2), Lewis's uncle and aunt, burger van proprietors and drug dealers
- Colin Scott (Chris Finch, series 3), Matt's partner
- Ria Cheetham (Maria Lennon, series 3), LEA adviser
- Lucy (Emma Hartley-Miller, series 3), a young woman who Chlo meets when she runs away from home
- Fleur Budgen (Lorraine Cheshire, series 3−4, 6; guest series 7; uncredited series 1), Grantly's wife
- Stuart Hordley (Silas Carson, series 3), a developer who blackmails Rachel over her past
- Ralph Mellor (Malcolm Scates, series 4), Head of Governors and Flick's father
- Prince Kelly (Charlie and Taylor Sheldrick, series 4; uncredited series 7), the youngest Kelly sibling
- Grace Campbell (Meaghan McPherson-Gowe, series 4), Kim's illegally adopted baby daughter
- Marion James (Louise Delamere, series 5; guest series 7), Lindsay and Emily's mother
- Georgia Stevenson (Fiona Allen, series 5), Josh's mother
- Jennifer Headley (Georgia Mackenzie, series 5), LEA representative and Max Tyler's ex-wife
- Alison Yates (Sharlene Whyte, series 5), social worker
- Oliver Mead (John McArdle, series 5), Chris's father, who begins a relationship with Steph
- John Fry (Ralph Ineson, series 6; guest series 5), Ruby's husband
- Dylan Hodge (Ciarán Griffiths, series 6), Bex's manipulative ex-boyfriend
- Naomi Scotcher (Debra Stephenson, series 7), Rob's wife and Aiden's mother
- Richard Whitman (Nicholas Gleaves, series 7), Director of Education
- Tina Allen (Lisa Riley, series 7; guest series 8), Scout's mother
- Liam Allen (Tristain and Shaun Pires, series 7), Scout's younger brother
- Wayne Johnson (Rob Haythorne, series 7), Michael's attacker
- Nelson Smith (John Thomson, series 7; guest series 8), Phoenix and Harley's father
- Rosie Matthews (Jo-Anne Knowles, series 7), an old friend of Matt's and later mother to his daughter, Martha
- Craig O'Leary (Matt Kennard, series 7), Janeece's fiancé
- Eugene Garvey (Stefan Gumbs, series 7), Ex-pupil and gang leader
- Alan Dixon (James Gaddas, series 7), Director of Education
- Gerard Findlay (Alex Norton, series 8), Headteacher of Havelock High
- Billy Byrne (Ron Donachie, series 8), Michael's terminally ill father
- Steve-O Malone (Jody Latham, series 8), Dynasty's boyfriend
- Robert Bain (Shaun Prendergast, series 9; guest series 8), Head of Education and Sue's father
- Vix Spark (Kristin Atherton, series 9), Sue's sister, who begins a relationship with Nikki
- Grace Drummond (Judith Barker, series 10), an elderly woman befriended by Rhiannon and Darren
- Hassan Bukhari (Ian Aspinall, series 10), Abdul's father and sponsor of the school's bike loan scheme
- Ronnie Fairchild (Robin Laing, series 10), local police officer and Scott's father
- Steph Norton (Nadine Marshall, series 10), Guy and Carrie's mother
- Selina Wilson (Nicola Grier, series 10), Head of the Greenock Education Committee
- Rob Hutchinson (Gareth David-Lloyd, series 10), PR consultant and Lorna's husband
- Tommy Charles (Teddy Thomas, series 11; guest series 13, 15, 17), Chlo and Donte's seven-year-old son
- Erica Thorn (Sue Vincent, series 11), LEA representative
- Hannah King (Lisa Faulkner, series 11), Lindon's wife
- Ramesh Choudhry (Paul Bazely, series 12), Samia's father and head of the board of governors
- Rose Massey (Jenny Platt, series 12), Myles's mother and a school governor
- Lisa Jackson (Sia Kiwa, series 12; guest series 16), Dwayne and Zayne's mother
- Vinny McCullen (Jason Milligan, series 12; guest series 11), a local loan shark and Danny's stepfather
- Serena Michelle Davies (Kerry Howard, series 13–14, 17; guest series 15–16), Deputy CEO of the Lowry Community Academies Trust
- Pete Weever (William Fox, series 13; guest series 16), Schuey and Portia's father
- Anthony Walters (Karl Davies, series 17), football coach and Nicky's ex-husband
