= Waterloo Road series 15 =

Waterloo Road
- Series 15
- Starring: Lindsey Coulson; James Baxter; Saira Choudhry; Jo Coffey; Neil Fitzmaurice; Rachel Leskovac; Kym Marsh; Katherine Pearce; Shauna Shim; Adam Thomas
- No. of episodes: 8

Release
- Original network: BBC One; BBC iPlayer
- Original release: 11 February – 1 April 2025

Series chronology
- ← Previous; Series 14 Next → Series 16

The fifteenth series of the British television drama series Waterloo Road commenced airing on 11 February 2025, and concluded on 1 April 2025. The series comprised 8 episodes.

The show follows the lives of staff and students of the eponymous secondary academy in Greater Manchester while tackling a range of social issues including challenging behaviour, reasonable adjustments, revenge porn, pregnancy, youth justice, nepotism, assault, coercive control, post-traumatic stress disorder, dementia, fostering, and chronic pain.

== Production ==
Series 15 was announced along with series 13 and 14 by the BBC in August 2023. In January 2025, further details around the series was revealed, with 8 episodes commissioned for the fifteenth series, it also confirmed that Series 15 would premiere on 11 February 2025, with the full series being released on BBC iPlayer prior to transmission.

=== Casting ===
The majority of series regulars from the fourteenth series reprised their roles for this series, these included James Baxter, Jo Coffey, Saira Choudhry, Neil Fitzmaurice, Rachel Leskovac, Kym Marsh, Katherine Pearce, Shauna Shim, and Adam Thomas, portraying Joe Casey, Wendy Whitwell, Nisha Chandra, Neil Guthrie, Coral Walker, Nicky Walters, Amy Spratt, Valerie Chambers, and Donte Charles.

Additionally, Kerry Howard, Hollie-Jay Bowes, Tom Wells, and Ryan Clayton reprised their roles from the fourteenth series as recurring characters Serena-Michelle Davies, Debs Rafferty, Marc Todd, and Mike Rutherford.

Lindsey Coulson joined the cast as Dame Stella Drake, the new Headteacher of Waterloo Road, replacing Steve Savage (Jason Manford) following his arrest. Olly Rhodes returned as Steve's son Billy for two episodes. The return of Jason Merrells as Jack Rimmer, a former headteacher of Waterloo Road, was announced via a BBC press release in December 2024, with Merrells appearing in the final two episodes of the series.

Almost all of the students from the previous series return, with the exception of Noah Valentine and Alicia Ford as Preston Walters and Kelly-Jo Rafferty, whose characters departed at the end of series 14. Returning pupils include Summer Violet Bird, Liam Scholes, Lucy Eleanor Begg, and Thapelo Ray as Nicky's daughter Tonya Walters, Noel McManus, Caz Williams, and Joe's former foster son Dwayne Jackson. Other students include Hattie Dynevor, Chiamaka Ulebor, Zak Sutcliffe, Maisie Robinson, Tillie Amartey, Miya Ocego, Sonya Nisa, Aabay Noor Ali, Danny Murphy, and Matthew Khan as Neil's daughter Libby Guthrie, Shola Aku, school troublemaker Schumacher 'Schuey' Weever, his sister Portia Weever, Stacey 'Stace' Neville, Lois Taylor-Brown, Aleena Qureshi, Mollie 'Mog' Richardson, Luca Smith, and Jared Jones.

In January 2025, it was confirmed that Lauren Patel would join the cast as Jas Sharma, a new teacher at Waterloo Road, as well as being the daughter of established character Nisha Chandra (Saira Choudhry), alongside new pupils Agnes Eccleston (Niamh Blackshaw), and Cat Guthrie (Lucy Chambers), Neil's other daughter and Libby's sister. Cory McClane also joins the series as new pupil Ashton Stone, the son of Celine Stone (formerly Dixon, portrayed by Zeriozha Annika) who last appeared in the third series as a pupil. Fay Jagger appears in episode three as Gemma Neville, Stace's mum, while Louise Willoughby appears in episode eight as the teacher of Donte's son Tommy (Teddy Thomas), who returns after last being seen in series thirteen.

=== Scheduling ===
The fifteenth series debuted on 11 February 2025 at 9pm on BBC One, a difference from previous series of the revival, and aired weekly. The series was released fully as a boxset at 6am on the day of broadcast of the first episode.

== Cast and characters ==
=== Main cast ===
- Lindsey Coulson as Dame Stella Drake; Headteacher and English Teacher, replacing Steve Savage
- James Baxter as Joe Casey; Deputy Head and languages teacher
- Saira Choudhry as Nisha Chandra; Maths teacher and Science Teacher
- Jo Coffey as Wendy Whitwell; PA to Headteacher
- Neil Fitzmaurice as Neil Guthrie; History teacher
- Rachel Leskovac as Coral Walker; Deputy Head and English teacher
- Kym Marsh as Nicky Walters; Dinner lady
- Katherine Pearce as Amy Spratt; Early career English and drama teacher
- Shauna Shim as Valerie Chambers; Music teacher
- Adam Thomas as Donte Charles; Trainee teacher
- Jason Merrells as Jack Rimmer; Counsellor and former headteacher of Waterloo Road (from episode 7)

=== Pupils ===
- Summer Violet Bird as Tonya Walters
- Thapelo Ray as Dwayne Jackson
- Chiamaka Ulebor as Shola Aku
- Hattie Dynevor as Libby Guthrie
- Zak Sutcliffe as Schumacher 'Schuey' Weever
- Tillie Amartey as Stacey 'Stace' Neville
- Liam Scholes as Noel McManus
- Maisie Robinson as Portia Weever
- Aabay Noor Ali as Mollie 'Mog' Richardson
- Sonya Nisa as Aleena Qureshi
- Miya Ocego as Lois Taylor-Brown
- Danny Murphy as Luca Smith
- Matthew Khan as Jared Jones
- Lucy Chambers as Cat Guthrie
- Niamh Blackshaw as Agnes Eccleston
- Cory McClane as Ashton Stone

=== Recurring ===
- Zeriozha Annika as Celine Stone; Former Waterloo Road pupil, and current pupil Ashton's mother
- Hollie-Jay Bowes as Debs Rafferty; School cleaner and Nicky's sister
- Ryan Clayton as Mike Rutherford; Waterloo Road's assigned police officer and Joe's husband
- Kerry Howard as Serena Michelle Davies; chief executive officer of Lowry Community Academies Trust
- Lauren Patel as Jas Sharma; Early career English teacher
- Tom Wells as Marc Todd; Maths teacher

=== Guest ===
- Olly Rhodes as Billy Savage; Former Waterloo Road pupil
- Fay Jagger as Gemma Neville; Stace's mother, a former schoolmate of Wendy, and pupil under Stella
- Teddy Thomas as Tommy Charles; Donte's son
- Louise Willoughby as Miss Sendall; Primary School Teacher of Tommy Charles

== Episodes ==
No. in series	Title	Directed by	Written by	Original release date	UK viewers (millions)
231	Episode 1	Jesse Quinones	Kellie Smith	11 February 2025	N/A
Following events with Steve Savage, Serena Michelle hires Dame Stella Drake as Waterloo Road's new Headteacher. The staff are wary, as despite her successful career as a head and her later work as an Ofsted inspector, Stella had recently made national headlines after comments about the parents of her former pupils were taken out of context. Donte begins his first day as a trainee teacher, supported by Nisha with whom he has begun a casual relationship. Ashton Stone, son of former pupil Celine, starts at Waterloo Road, and Stella warns him that the disruptive behavioural conduct at his previous school will not be tolerated. Neil chastises Libby for prioritizing her relationship with Jared over her schoolwork, so Jared tries to endear himself to Neil by faking an interest in the Peterloo Massacre. Ashton steals Stella's car keys from Donte and takes Dwayne on a joyride. He later admits to Donte that his father will kick him out of the house if he gets into trouble at school again. Donte shares how his previous actions behind the wheel lead to the death of a friend, and ultimately covers for Ashton, who promises that he's learned his lesson. Stella announces that all reasonable adjustments, including counselling and the wellbeing room, have been paused, feeling the students have started taking advantage, a controversial move amongst staff, pupils, and parents. She holds a heated meeting with the parents and reinforces that the role of her school is not to fulfil the role of social services.
232	Episode 2	Jesse Quinones	Kat Rose-Martin	18 February 2025	N/A
Billy's sentencing hearing is held – Joe attends as his appropriate adult in Steve's absence, and Shuey is also in court to give evidence. Billy is sentenced to 18 months in youth rehab, and both boys struggle with the verdict. Agnes connects with Shuey by taking him to her youth group to cheer him up. New teacher Jas has a mixed start to her time at Waterloo Road, and is later revealed to secretly be Nisha's daughter. Donte suspects that he may be Ashton's father, confiding to Neil that, when they were pupils, Celine told him she was pregnant before she left Waterloo Road. He has Wendy contact Celine, who initially dismisses him but later admits that he is right. She has Donte promise not to interfere in Ashton's life in exchange for allowing him to remain at the school. Aleena is devastated when intimate photos of her are leaked, and Stella and Coral disagree over how best to manage the situation. Stella gives an intense assembly warning the older students of the consequences of sharing the images, which just upsets Aleena further and causes her to argue with Stace and Lois, though they later reconcile. After Coral supports Aleena, Stella apologizes and offers to mentor her in getting her Headteacher qualification. Coral discovers she is pregnant and is dismissed by Neil, who is shocked. Following a discussion with Libby, he affirms to Coral that they will raise the baby together.
233	Episode 3	Khurrum M Sultan	Caroline Mitchell	25 February 2025	N/A
Stella rolls out a new Accelerated Learning Program designed to help the best performing students, which proves divisive. Donte tries to get Ashton onto the program, and convinces Nisha to take a chance on him. Neil's youngest daughter Cat has her first day at Waterloo Road, causing a rift in Libby's relationship with Jared, who becomes frustrated that she is prioritizing her sister over him. Wendy and Stella clash when she criticizes her ability to manage her time. When Coral and Stella are inadvertently pushed over by Stace, Stella chastises her for the impact it could have had on Coral's pregnancy, and calls in her mum, a former pupil, to discuss punishment. The school receives a death threat towards Stella, forcing them to implement security protocols. Stace's mum barges into Stella's class and berates her for her lack of compassion for towards students, and blames her for excluding her when she was a pupil. She later pushes Stella down the stairs and brutally attacks her. Stella is found by Stace and Amy, leading the school to go into full lockdown. Noel later finds Stace and encourages her to tell the Police the truth about what happened, resulting in her mum's arrest. Jas finds out that Donte is Ashton's father and the two kiss. Wendy visits Stella in hospital, feeling guilty for potentially riling up Stace's mum, and the two reconcile as Stella reconsiders her harsh leadership style.
234	Episode 4	Khurrum M Sultan	Jayshree Patel	4 March 2025	N/A
Stella returns to work, but struggles to reckon with what happened to her. In an attempt to support Ashton, Donte agrees to chaperone Nisha's Mathlympics trip, where his relationship with both Jas and Nisha is revealed, devasting Jas. While preparing an audition tape for drama school, Libby receives harsh criticism from Jared, who expresses frustration that she is spending so much time away from him. Amy begins to grow concerned about his behaviour towards Libby, though Libby and Neil brush this off. Jared later encourages Libby to give up on her dream of being an actress, and manipulates her into an emotional outburst at Amy for interfering in their relationship. A letter from Billy rattles Schuey, stirring up unresolved trauma around Boz's death. Unexpectedly, he finds solace in Agnes, who stands up for him after Stella catches him in a fight with another student. The two continue to grow closer at Agnes' youth group. Nisha encourages Donte to reconcile with Jas, where Ashton inadvertently overhears him tell her he thinks he is his father. Finding out he's been lied to his whole life, Ashton storms off.
235	Episode 5	Amy Coop	Julia Kent	11 March 2025	N/A
Stella is arrested for drink driving but is cleared after a second breathalyser and asks Mike and Joe not to tell anyone. Ashton continues to act out at school, exposing Donte's relationships with Nisha and Jas, and revealing them as mother and daughter. After an argument with Donte, Tonya encourages Ashton to give him a second chance. Agnes secretly visits Billy in prison, and later convinces Shuey to go and see him. Billy confronts Shuey, telling him that his bullying ultimately contributed towards Boz's death and that he is too damaged to be with someone like Agnes. Amy's suspicions around Jared intensify and she raises a safeguarding to Stella and Val. Despite this, she interrogates Luca for information and contacts Jared's former girlfriend, who shows up at the school and attacks him. Libby denies any concerning behaviour. Stella tells Amy that she has gone too far and fires her. Joe convinces her to reconsider, but Amy chooses to resign permanently, imploring Libby to reach out in the future if she needs help. Questioning her decision-making in light of her assault, Stella asks Joe to find her a therapist. Jared's control over Libby continues and he begins to isolate her from her friends and sister, and destroys her phone when she asks about his former girlfriend.
236	Episode 6	Amy Coop	Natalie Mitchell	18 March 2025	N/A
Lois grapples with the failing health of her nan, who is living with dementia and does not recognise her following her transition. She gives a presentation following her nan's death which inspires Stella to be more brave moving forward. Shuey takes bad advice from Noel and Stace on how to impress Agnes and ends up embarrassing both of them, but Joe and Mike support him to reconcile with her using honest communication. Agnes and Portia later convince him to agree to being fostered by Joe and Mike. Jared turns Libby against Neil and Cat, blaming them for getting in the middle of their relationship, and convinces her to move into a caravan in his garden. Nicky's parenting is questioned when Tonya causes an accident during a science experiment that almost seriously injures Nisha. Tonya later confesses to Nicky that she has been taking painkillers that Ashton stole from his grandmother in order to cope with the symptoms of her chronic pain, which is causing her to fall behind in school. Shola and Mog later find her collapsed, and she is taken to hospital where the doctors find a burst ovarian cyst and endometriosis.
237	Episode 7	Thomas Hescott	Baby Isako	25 March 2025	N/A
Stella reluctantly attends therapy after the attack. Initially disagreeing with her therapist, Jack Rimmer, she eventually finds the session helpful and books more. After finding that Libby's grades are slipping, Neil forces her to stay behind at the school while the others go on a history trip. Separated from Jared, Cat uses the opportunity to confront her about his controlling behaviour, but she continues to deny anything is wrong. When she doesn't answer her phone, Jared tracks Libby down and they argue, with Jared almost getting hit by a car which convinces Libby to stay with him. Cat secretly gives her a mobile phone. Nisha prepares to take over for Coral when she goes on maternity leave, and reassures her that she is capable of being a mother. After being kicked out by his mum, Ashton faces homelessness, but Donte ultimately decides to take him in which confuses Izzy. Stella is wary of Joe's plan to foster Shuey, but gives him her blessing. Looking for some alone time, Stace and Noel find Coral is in labour, and she gives birth at the school. After she is injured during a fight after Jared finds her phone, Libby runs away and returns to her family.
238	Episode 8	Thomas Hescott	Davey Jones	1 April 2025	N/A
With insufficient evidence after being reported to the Police, Jared is allowed to return to school which upsets Libby and Neil, particularly after an unsuccessful mediation by Stella. He continuously tries to reconcile with Libby, leading her to think she overreacted and consider remaining in contact. Izzy struggles with Ashton's presence in their lives, and Donte chastises him for being a bad influence on Tommy, but the two later make up. Shuey is evasive about his plans, and Joe discovers that he is trying to find a new direction in life through spoken word performance at the youth club. Stella's estranged daughter Sam is detained in hospital after a psychotic episode but she refuses to allow Stella to see her. Ashton asks Tonya on a date, but she lets him down gently. Jared's behaviour begins to exhibit itself again, and he pulls the fire alarm to get Libby alone, demanding that she take him back. He attacks her and she is taken to hospital. Val calls Amy, who consoles Neil gives Libby advice around next steps. Neil apologises for not taking her concerns about Jared seriously. Cat realises that Libby recorded the attack, and Mike arrests Jared. Remembering her own assault, Stella is triggered and calls Jack, who reassures her that she did everything she could. Stella admits that she made a mistake by removing all pastoral support from the school and asks Jack to run a new scheme. He initially refuses, but changes his mind after reconnecting with Donte.
