= Waterloo Road series 14 =

Waterloo Road
- Series 14
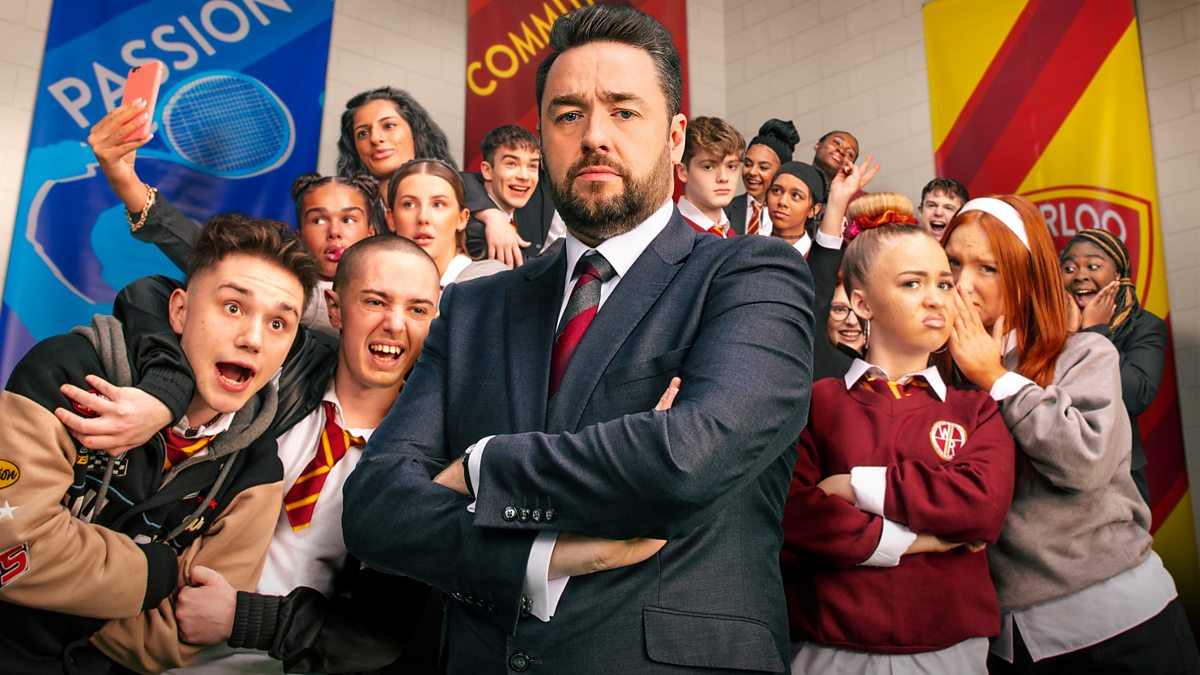
- Waterloo Road S14 Promo
- Starring: Jason Manford; James Baxter; Saira Choudhry; Jo Coffey; Neil Fitzmaurice; Rachel Leskovac; Kym Marsh; Katherine Pearce; Shauna Shim; Adam Thomas
- No. of episodes: 8

Release
- Original network: BBC One; BBC iPlayer
- Original release: 10 September – 29 October 2024

Series chronology
- ← Previous; Series 13 Next → Series 15

The fourteenth series of the British television drama series Waterloo Road commenced airing on 10 September 2024, and concluded on 29 October 2024. The series comprised 8 episodes.

The show follows the lives of staff and pupils of the eponymous secondary academy in Greater Manchester while tackling a range of social issues including trolling, the cost-of-living crisis, gender politics, bullying, being a child in care, bereavement, menstruation, County lines drug trafficking, the arts vs academic performance, being deaf, and manslaughter.

== Production ==
Series 14 was announced along with series 13 and 15 by the BBC in August 2023. The press release confirmed that it would comprise eight episodes and that filming would commence that same year. Filming commenced in a new building for the Waterloo Road Academy setting, provided by Manchester College in one of its former campuses.

In August 2024, it was confirmed that Series 14 would premiere on 10 September 2024.

=== Casting ===
The majority of series regulars from the thirteenth series reprised their roles for this series, these included James Baxter, Jo Coffey, Neil Fitzmaurice, Rachel Leskovac, Kym Marsh, Katherine Pearce, Shauna Shim, and Adam Thomas, portraying Joe Casey, Wendy Whitwell, Neil Guthrie, Coral Walker, Nicky Walters, Amy Spratt, Valerie Chambers, and Donte Charles, respectively. Vincent Jerome did not return from the previous season as Lindon King, while Ryan Clayton returns as Mike Rutherford in a recurring capacity.

New pupils introduced in the fourteenth series included Billy Savage (Olly Rhodes), Boz Osbourne (Nathan Wood), Aleena Qureshi (Sonya Nisa), Lois Taylor-Brown (Miya Ocego), Luca Smith (Danny Murphy), and Jared Jones (Matthew Khan). Almost all of the students from the previous series return, with the exception of Inathi Rozani, Zanele Nyoni and Teddy Wallwork as Zayne Jackson, Jess Clarke and Declan Harding respectively. Returning pupils include Noah Valentine and Summer Violet Bird as Preston and Tonya Walters, with Alicia Ford as their cousin Kelly Jo Rafferty. Liam Scholes, Lucy Eleanor Begg, and Thapelo Ray portray Noel McManus, Caz Williams, and Joe's former foster son Dwayne Jackson. Younger students include Hattie Dynevor, Chiamaka Ulebor, Zak Sutcliffe, Maisie Robinson, Tillie Amartey, and Aabay Noor Ali as Neil's daughter Libby Guthrie, Shola Aku, school troublemaker Schumacher 'Schuey' Weever, his sister Portia Weever, Stacey 'Stace' Neville, and Mollie 'Mog' Richardson. Francesco Piacentini-Smith, who plays Dean Weever, Shuey and Portia's cousin, appears only in the first episode.

Additionally, Kerry Howard, Tom Wells, Hollie-Jay Bowes and Marie Critchley reprised their roles from the thirteenth series as recurring characters Serena Michelle Davies, Marc Todd, Debs Rafferty, and Barbara Rafferty, respectively. Former pupils Kai Sharif and Samia Choudhry return in the final episode, with Adam Ali and Priyasasha Kumari reprising their roles alongside Angela Griffin and Jamie Glover who return as Kim Campbell and her husband Andrew Treneman.

Jason Manford joined the cast as Steve Savage, the new Headteacher of Waterloo Road, replacing Kim Campbell (Angela Griffin) following her departure from the school. Saira Choudhry also joined the cast as Nisha Chandra, the new Head of Maths.

=== Scheduling ===
The series debuted on 10 September 2024 at 9pm on BBC One, all episodes of the series were made available as a boxset on BBC iPlayer earlier that day.

== Cast and characters ==
=== Main cast ===
- Jason Manford as Steve Savage; the new Headteacher of Waterloo Road, replacing Kim Campbell
- James Baxter as Joe Casey; Deputy Head and languages teacher
- Saira Choudhry as Nisha Chandra; Head of Maths
- Jo Coffey as Wendy Whitwell; PA to Headteacher
- Neil Fitzmaurice as Neil Guthrie; History teacher
- Rachel Leskovac as Coral Walker; Deputy Head and English teacher
- Kym Marsh as Nicky Walters; School canteen worker
- Katherine Pearce as Amy Spratt; Early career English and drama teacher
- Shauna Shim as Valerie Chambers; Music teacher
- Adam Thomas as Donte Charles; Site manager and supply PE teacher

=== Featured ===
- Angela Griffin as Kim Campbell, former Headteacher (episode 8)

=== Pupils ===
- Noah Valentine as Preston Walters
- Alicia Forde as Kelly Jo Rafferty
- Liam Scholes as Noel McManus
- Lucy Eleanor Begg as Caz Williams
- Summer Violet Bird as Tonya Walters
- Thapelo Ray as Dwayne Jackson
- Chiamaka Ulebor as Shola Aku
- Hattie Dynevor as Libby Guthrie
- Zak Sutcliffe as Schumacher 'Schuey' Weever
- Tillie Amartey as Stacey 'Stace' Neville
- Maisie Robinson as Portia Weever
- Aabay Noor Ali as Mollie 'Mog' Richardson
- Olly Rhodes as Billy Savage
- Nathan Wood as Boz Osbourne
- Sonya Nisa as Aleena Qureshi
- Miya Ocego as Lois Taylor-Brown
- Danny Murphy as Luca Smith
- Matthew Khan as Jared Jones

=== Recurring ===
- Hollie-Jay Bowes as Debs Rafferty; school cleaner and Kelly Jo's mum
- Tom Wells as Marc Todd; Maths teacher
- Kerry Howard as Serena Michelle Davies; chief executive officer of Lowry Community Academies Trust
- Ryan Clayton as Mike Rutherford, Joe's husband and liaison Police officer with Waterloo Road

=== Guest ===
- Francesco Piacentini-Smith as Dean Weever, a troublemaking pupil (episode 1)
- Marie Critchley as Barbara Rafferty, Nicky and Debs' mother (episode 1)
- Krissi Bohn, as Melanie Parkinson, a local MP to visits Waterloo Road (episode 6)
- Jamie Glover as Andrew Treneman (episode 8)
- Priyasasha Kumari as Samia Choudhry, Kelly Jo's best friend and a former Waterloo Road pupil (episode 8)
- Adam Ali as Kai Sharif, Preston's boyfriend and a former Waterloo Road pupil (episode 8)

== Episodes ==
No. in series	Title	Directed by	Written by	Original release date	UK viewers (millions)
223	Episode 1	Robin Sheppard	Kellie Smith	10 September 2024	N/A
Waterloo Road, now fully integrated into Lowry Community Academies Trust, has been relocated to a new site, and Joe has become Acting Head under the mentorship of Steve Savage, the Headteacher of another school in the Trust. His first day in charge gets off to a difficult start when the staff realise they do not have a staff room. Joe then attempts to help Amy financially through additional payments, but cannot follow through when the rest of the staff hear of his plan and soon faces a rebellion. Nicky sees Steve on school grounds and recognises him, as they were in a relationship as teenagers. She later learns that her mother has died, and Steve comforts her. Schuey and Portia have been sent to different foster placements, but plan to move to Blackpool and live in their uncle's caravan. Tonya convinces Portia not to go ahead with the plan. Libby is being trolled by text message and suspects Dean, who has returned to the school with a troubling new attitude. Libby finds an unlikely confidante in Kelly Jo, who tricks Dean into confessing. Outsmarted, he loses control and takes a swing at Neil who restrains him on the floor. Joe is compelled to suspend Neil, who suspects Joe is acting out of retaliation. Dean's friends turn against him and he is permanently excluded. Led by Coral, the rest of the staff make it clear that they have no confidence in Joe's leadership and when he finds himself stuck in an elevator, the staff use this as an excuse to shut the school on the grounds of safety. Joe realises he cannot continue as Headteacher. Steve tracks down the staff in the local pub and listens to their concerns, before revealing to Joe that the Trust have approached him to step in as Headteacher.
224	Episode 2	Robin Sheppard	Neil Jones	17 September 2024	N/A
The Raffertys are coming to terms with Barbara's death in their own individual ways. Nicky's primary concern is that they cannot afford to honour her last wishes but her sister Debs is devastated. Tonya also takes the death of her nan badly, but is advised by newcomer Billy to try calling her mobile so she can hear her voice once more. Unbeknownst to Tonya he is none other than Steve's son. Schuey is under the influence of county lines dealer Carla Duggan and is selling vapes. When he is caught smoking his own supply in the disabled toilets, Joe investigates a misaligned ceiling tile and finds a stash of class A drugs. Steve deduces Carla's hand in this and warns Schuey to stay away from her malign influence. He asks for a full bag search under the guise of trying to establish the scale of vaping amongst the student body. The staff are asked to review each other's departments. Coral and Neil vie for the position of co-deputy head. The two review each other's lessons and find themselves at loggerheads. It takes Amy to make Neil realise he is putting his relationship in jeopardy for the sake of a promotion. Steve notices the ceiling tile in the disabled toilets askew once again and realises someone has been back for the stash unaware it has been discovered. Mog confides in Preston that she is the mule and that she has been coerced into drug running for Carla. When Steve finally learns of this he proposes an unorthodox course of action, one that Joe has grave reservations about. Mog arranges to meet with Carla where Steve confronts her and lets her fall for his trap. When Schuey discovers Billy is the head's son, he attacks him as a surrogate for revenge on Mr Savage. The discovery of a large box of cash belonging to Barbara has the Rafferty sisters at each other's throats once more.
225	Episode 3	Piotr Szkopiak	Jayshree Patel	24 September 2024	N/A
Coral discovers she has a rival for the post of co-deputy head in the form of Nisha. When a parent threatens to complain to Ofsted about Neil insulting her son, Coral pretends to be deputy head in an attempt to portray herself as a respected authority figure. In Nisha's presence she is forced to take a hard line with Neil and suggests he takes part in restorative justice. Meanwhile Donte covers Coral's girl's P.E. class, but is met with indifference from them, who see him as no more than a janitor in joggers. When he approaches Tonya to establish why she didn't back him, she confides in him that she is suffering severe menstrual cramps. Touched by his support, Tonya is later instrumental in persuading the class to participate in the Tag rugby session Donte has planned. Debs Rafferty has joined the cleaning staff at the school, but Nicky is still not on talking terms with her and is still trying to keep her former relationship with Steve under wraps from Donte. The situation deteriorates when Debs deliberately spills the beans. Kelly Jo, sensing that (her gran's) money is at the root of all of the problems, intervenes by taking the cash and redistributing it from the top floor of the school. Pupils and teachers alike find cash raining down on them, but the lucky few later discover they are not so fortunate after all, as most of the notes are monopoly money. When Billy auditions for Noel and Preston for a spot in the school's 'Battle of the Bands' competition, he stuns the cafeteria into silence. Whilst he is chatting to Val, his guitar, a gift from his deceased mother, goes missing and is found smashed up in a corridor. When Billy confronts Schuey, he finds himself challenged to a fight after school where he is beaten by the gang and humiliated. Steve impressed by Coral's initiative appoints her co-deputy head. Kelly Jo splits her gran's savings between herself and her two cousins, advising Tonya and Preston not to blow their share but to save it for a rainy day. In the aftermath of the Steve revelation, Nicky proposes to Donte.
226	Episode 4	Piotr Szkopiak	Natalie Mitchell	1 October 2024	N/A
Val Chambers comes under pressure from Steve to produce a good set of mock exam results in A-level music. She unsuccessfully argues that the theoretical side of the subject is not as important as the practical one. When Noel, who has never been academically gifted but a talented musician nonetheless fails, Val questions an education system that values results over personal development and her role in it. Her imminent departure sends shockwaves throughout the school. Whilst newly engaged Donte attends a recruitment event for budding teachers, replacement caretaker Jamie takes the reins. Nicky suspects Steve's hand in Donte's absence and questions his ulterior motives. Tonya continues to struggle with severe abdominal pains and bleeding. Nicky is alarmed when Tonya's GP suggests the contraceptive pill as something that could help with the symptoms. When she is taken to hospital no clear diagnosis is made. Schuey's campaign of intimidation against Billy continues and he considers pulling out of a performance at the battle of the bands. Noel, under the impression that Val has been fired, changes the venue as a mark of protest. Witnessing his son's performance of his late wife's favourite song leads Steve to reconsider how to support the less academically able students. He extends an olive branch to Val, who agrees to withdraw her resignation. Schuey, stinging from a rebuff by Stacie Neville and jealous of Billy's success assaults him in the car park after the event finishes.
227	Episode 5	John Maidens	Charlie Swinbourne	8 October 2024	N/A
Billy is witness to Dwyane being ambushed and his bike stolen by masked youths. He recognises a chain-link bracelet that one of the assailants has dropped as the property of Schuey. Hoping the return of the item to its owner will finally get his tormentors to leave him alone, Billy hands it back to Schuey, who simply perceives this as a sign of weakness and continues to terrorise him, ordering him to take Dwayne's bike to a drop-off location where it can later be sold. Billy anonymously ensures that the bike is returned, further angering Shuey. Later, Shuey and his sidekick Boz attempt to mess with Preston's bike, and he punches Boz in retaliation and scares them off. Following a merger the school welcomes multiple hearing impaired pupils, including Luca and Jared, join the school along with their Communication Support Workers (CSWs). Shola volunteers to buddy with Luca to help him settle in. Libby, initially reluctant to become a buddy, changes her mind when she sees Jared. The two hit it off immediately. Luca's disorientation is compounded by the fact that Jess, his CSW, is only qualified to BSL level 1 and not very proficient at that. A faulty radio aid increases his sense of isolation and he walks out of class. Fortunately, Coral with some rudimentary signing skills is able to coax him back. Donte's misspent youth catches up with him when learns that a GCSE in Maths is required to qualify as a teacher. Too embarrassed to ask Nisha for help directly, he installs a webcam in her class to observe lessons. The discovery of the device leads to a confession and a request for help, which is agreed in return for fixing Nisha's car. Schuey and Boz tamper with Preston's bike. When he catches them he threatens to kill them if he finds them messing with it again. Billy, unable to take any more and told to stand up for himself by his dad finally retaliates by deploying a taut-wire trap across the path of Schuey' and Boz's bikes. The resulting fall kills Boz. When Steve arrives on the scene he decides to protect his son by throwing Boz's body and bike into the canal to make it look like an accident and the pair leave without reporting the tragedy.
228	Episode 6	John Maidens	Paul Mousley	15 October 2024	N/A
Boz's absence from both school and his care home has not gone unnoticed. When the police escalate it to a missing persons enquiry, they question Schuey, who denies Boz being a close friend and remarks that it is not unusual for him to go AWOL for days at a time. Billy, unable to handle the guilt is slowly unravelling, and even Steve is buckling under the pressure with constant flashbacks to the night of Boz's death and his part in disposing of the body. When the police return to inform the head that a corpse has been found in the canal, Steve has to identify the deceased. The impending closure of the local youth centre has Kelly Jo on the warpath. She ambushes the local MP, who is on a visit to the school to promote a higher education outreach programme with her petition. When this fails to yield results Kelly Jo side-tracks the MP to the centre and tries to impress on her how great a loss of the facility would be to the community. Admiring Kelly Jo's grit and determination, the MP offers to put her forward for a scholarship to university. Noting the MP's impotence, Kelly Jo has other thoughts on the matter. After Steve announces Boz's death to the school, Billy allows Schuey to attack him once more. The police begin to suspect foul play may have had a hand in the demise of Boz.
229	Episode 7	Angela Griffin	Andrea Dewsbery & Liz Lewin	22 October 2024	N/A
The confirmation that the investigation into Boz's death by the police is now a murder inquiry leaves Steve on edge. After a school-wide assembly, an appeal for information by the police uncovers the altercation with Preston and the video of bullying by Schuey's gang. When Preston is taken in for questioning by the police, Billy considers handing himself in but is dissuaded by his father. Nisha's teaching methods come under the spotlight when Shola's father visits the school to address the decline in her Maths grades. In class, Nisha singles out Shola and simply plays back a recording of the lesson on quadratic equations and leaves the room in search of coffee. Later she presents Mr Todd's ideas for improvement as her own. Donte and Nicky's relationship hits a rocky patch. Donte, suspicious of Steve's intentions towards his fiancée, confronts him and loses his temper. Steve redirects the police's focus towards Schuey by giving false information about seeing him near the canal on the night of the tragedy. Schuey's alibi of being with his sister Portia comes under scrutiny. A search of the school uncovers Boz's bus pass and a roll of wire - in Schuey's locker. When asked to accompany the police to the station Schuey tries to escape but is caught by Donte. Subsequently arrested for murder, he asks for Kim Campbell.
230	Episode 8	Angela Griffin	Katie Douglas	29 October 2024	N/A
Schuey is remanded into youth detention after a court appearance where he pled not guilty. Looking on from the public gallery is a heavily pregnant Kim Campbell. During visiting time Schuey insists he is being framed and convinces Kim to investigate. Kim approaches Steve at the school and senses something is amiss when she receives an earful about the way the school was managed under her stewardship. During the memorial being held for Boz, an increasingly fragile Billy, who is being haunted by visions of the dead boy, makes his way to the school roof to confront his demons. When Steve arrives, Donte is witness to confessions from both father and son. Though he initially allows them to flee the school, Donte has a change of heart, telling Kim that he knows Schuey is innocent and that Billy murdered Boz. Donte and Nicky unable to see eye to eye on the matter call an end to their relationship but agree to remain friends. Kim catches Steve trying to run away with Billy, but convinces him to do the right thing, bolstered by Billy who expresses wanting to tell the truth. They are both remanded in custody and Shuey is released. Preston is studying for an Oxbridge entry exam despite it being his 18th birthday. When Samia and Kai turn up for a surprise party, he realises the only future he can imagine is one with Kai in London and that going to Oxbridge is not actually what he wants. Kelly Jo tells Samia that she will be leaving Waterloo Road to take up an apprenticeship working with young adults like herself in the community. The teens celebrate the next chapter of their lives together at Preston's party.
