= Waterloo Road series 13 =

Waterloo Road
- Series 13
- DVD cover
- Starring: Angela Griffin; James Baxter; Ryan Clayton; Jo Coffey; Neil Fitzmaurice; Jamie Glover; Vincent Jerome; Rachel Leskovac; Kym Marsh; Katherine Pearce; Shauna Shim; Adam Thomas
- No. of episodes: 8

Release
- Original network: BBC One; BBC iPlayer
- Original release: 2 January – 26 February 2024

Series chronology
- ← Previous; Series 12 Next → Series 14

The thirteenth series of the British television drama series Waterloo Road began airing on 2 January 2024, and concluded on 26 February 2024. The series comprised 8 episodes.

The show follows the lives of staff and Students of the eponymous secondary school in Greater Manchester while tackling a range of social issues. Topics covered include discussions around transforming the school into an academy, grief, catfishing, truancy, cultural identity, teen pregnancy, cancer, child abuse, planning for the future, theft, isolation, student-teacher crushes, abortion, family conflict, and relationship issues.

== Production ==
=== Casting ===
Previously news reports had revealed that series thirteen would introduce five new cast members as Students, namely Hattie Dynevor as Libby Guthrie, Zak Sutcliffe as Schumacher 'Schuey' Weever, Tillie Amartey as Stacey 'Stace' Neville, Maisie Robinson as Portia Weever, and Aabay Noor Ali as Mollie 'Mog' Richardson.

== Cast and characters ==
=== Main cast ===
- Angela Griffin as Kim Campbell; Headteacher
- James Baxter as Joe Casey; Deputy Head and languages teacher
- Ryan Clayton as Sergeant Mike Rutherford; School security officer
- Jo Coffey as Wendy Whitwell; PA to Headteacher
- Neil Fitzmaurice as Neil Guthrie; History teacher
- Vincent Jerome as Jamie King; Deputy Head and science teacher
- Rachel Leskovac as Coral Walker; Head of English
- Kym Marsh as Nicky Walters; School canteen worker
- Katherine Pearce as Amy Spratt; Early career English and drama teacher
- Shauna Shim as Valerie Chambers; Music teacher
- Adam Thomas as Donte Charles; School caretaker
- Jamie Glover as Andrew Treneman; Chief Executive Officer of Lowry Community Academies Trust and a former colleague of Kim's

=== Students ===
- Noah Valentine as Preston Walters
- Priyasasha Kumari as Samia Choudhry
- Adam Ali as Kai Sharif
- Alicia Forde as Kelly Jo Rafferty
- Francesco Piacentini-Smith as Dean Weever
- Liam Scholes as Noel McManus
- Lucy Eleanor Begg as Caz Williams
- Summer Violet Bird as Tonya Walters
- Scarlett Thomas as Izzy Charles
- Thapelo Ray as Dwayne Jackson
- Inathi Rozani as Zayne Jackson
- Chiamaka Ulebor as Shola Aku
- Hattie Dynevor as Libby Guthrie
- Zak Sutcliffe as Schumacher 'Schuey' Weever
- Tillie Amartey as Stacey 'Stace' Neville
- Maisie Robinson as Portia Weever
- Aabay Noor Ali as Mollie 'Mog' Richardson
- Zanele Nyoni as Jess Clarke
- Teddy Wallwork as Declan Harding

=== Recurring ===
- Sonia Ibrahim as Jamilah Omar, School social worker
- Hollie-Jay Bowes as Debs Rafferty, Kelly Jo's mother
- Marie Critchley as Barbara Rafferty, Nicky and Debs' mother
- Tom Wells as Marc Todd, Maths teacher
- Kerry Howard as Serena Michelle Davies, Deputy Chief Executive Officer / Acting Chief Executive Officer of Lowry Community Academies Trust
- William Fox as Pete Weever, Schuey and Portia's father

=== Guest ===
- Lauren Drummond as Mika Grainger (episode 8)

== Episodes ==
No. in series	Title	Directed by	Written by	Original release date	UK viewers (millions)
215	Episode 1	Vicky Thomas	Davey Jones	2 January 2024	N/A
Kim decides to tackle truancy with a new life skills initiative, starting with letters to parents of the most persistent offenders, employing a carrot and stick approach. The carrot being the promise of a free bus to Waterloo Road on the first day of the new term, and the stick highlighting that truancy is a criminal offence with a potential £2000 fine. Tonya is spotted shoplifting at the local off-licence, but an intervention by new pupil Schuey, results in them getting away. Pursued by the shopkeeper, they make it onto the school bus, but when the driver refuses to drive until the kids sit down, Schuey pushes him out and commandeers the bus. When Dean bumps into his cousins Schuey and Portia, despite the shared rebellious streak, it seems that they have little in common. In the meantime aided and abetted by Noel, he creates a fake profile for Coral on social media and proceeds to 'catfish' Neil. Samia, Val and much of the school is still reeling from the death of Danny. Kai proposes the retirement of Danny's basketball shirt number with many signing the framed top. With the frame damaged by the unruly new pupils, Lindon takes the shirt for reframing, but fails to notice it is stolen by Stace. Confronted by Samia and a cohort of Danny's friends, the rival groups trade insults before the all too predictable partisan punch-up, during which Tonya lands a right hook on the loud-mouthed Schuey, resulting in a bloodied nose. Schuey accuses Donte of being his assailant. Feeling neglected, Tonya joins forces with Schuey in an attempt at making Donte's life difficult. Having blocked a toilet to get him out of the way, they enter his office and steal a bracelet belonging to Izzy. When the police arrive, having identified her as the shoplifter, Donte defends Tonya like he would one of his own children, leading to a crisis of conscience.
216	Episode 2	Vicky Thomas	Jayshree Patel	9 January 2024	N/A
Andrew and Kim's personal relationship continues apace, and having highlighted the benefits that Waterloo Road could gain by becoming an Academy, finds Kim gradually starting to come round to the idea. She is keen to join his trust-led group of schools, but decides to keep it under wraps from her staff until Neil, now teachers' representative on the board of governors, reveals all. Some of the staff suspect Kim's judgement may be clouded by her personal feelings for Andrew. Preston is welcomed back to school by Kai, but is surprised to learn that his boyfriend is now basketball team captain. Feeling displaced by Kai, he decides that his future lies at a specialist sports college where he can make a fresh start. Amy convinces him to become a peer mentor to new year 9 student Mog who had been previously home-schooled. Astute and intelligent, she trades barbs with Preston but when he insults her, storms off. Eventually, the two find common ground participating in an online multiplayer game. Kelly Jo discovers Dean's catfishing and becomes part of the conspiracy. Meanwhile, Neil misconstrues conversations with Coral to comic effect. When Kelly Jo suggests that Neil might be the type to have a foot-fetish, the gang send a picture of Dean's feet with painted toe-nails to him. Finding the terrible tootsies a turn-off, Neil eventually confronts Coral in person about their 'situationship' and it finally dawns on him that he has been the victim of some skullduggery by person or persons unknown. In cahoots with Coral, he turns the tables on the culprits. That afternoon as he is leaving for an after work drink with Coral he receives an unexpected visitor.
217	Episode 3	Angela Griffin	Natalie Mitchell	23 January 2024	N/A
After arriving unexpectedly from New Zealand, Libby, Neil's 15-year-old daughter plots to remain with her father despite his insistence she return to her mother. Neil and Coral meanwhile have grown close after the catfishing incident and want to take things to the next level, but Libby interprets this as the reason her father doesn’t want her around. Having unilaterally ended his relationship with Kim, Andrew meets with her and Lindon for a meeting about joining the Academy Trust. When asked if he would replace Kim as Head if necessary, his silence is damning. Kim comes to the conclusion that her removal as Head was contingent on Waterloo Road becoming a part of the Academy Trust and Andrew had ended their relationship to make this easier. It subsequently transpires that Andrew has cancer. Shola has developed a crush for Mike and she seeks him out after class and asks for some extra tuition. When Schuey gets hold of her diary and reads it aloud in public, her secret is revealed. Mike is subsequently accused of grooming Shola by Schuey. While Lindon and Sonia investigate, the diary eventually finds its way to Kim. Shola confesses it is a work of fiction but Mike is nevertheless suspended. For the first time in her life Kelly Jo is curious about her heritage and begins a voyage of self-discovery. During a history lesson, she points out that despite the diverse make up of the student body, very little is taught about their different cultures. Her words strike a chord with Neil and he restructures his lesson to teach them about the Empire Windrush. Later he comes to a decision and tells his ex-wife that Libby will be remaining with him.
218	Episode 4	Angela Griffin	Jayshree Patel & Jessica Barnes	30 January 2024	N/A
On a day when the school is celebrating all things Jamaican, Joe and Lindon find themselves in charge when Kim takes a personal day to be with Andrew. Joe suggests Donte and Nicky join the Life Skills Initiative as teachers running cooking and DIY classes. When they are discussing the matter in private, Nicky is taken aback when Donte unexpectedly kisses her. Realising he might have crossed a line, Donte later tries to apologise but Nicky reciprocates the earlier kiss. Libby finds it hard to settle in and continues to try to manipulate the adults around her playing them off against each other. Her first target is Amy and plans to remove her as a lodger in her house by spreading lies about her to Coral. Kelly Jo's voyage of self-discovery continues with a new hairstyle and a podcast about her Jamaican roots. Debs regales her with memories of David, Kelly Jo's father, but is uncertain if he was actually Jamaican. Upset that her podcast could be factually incorrect and full of self-doubt, Kelly Jo confesses to Lindon that she is now unsure of her own identity. During one of her Podcast Q&A sessions she loses her self-control when Libby continually hints that Kelly Jo might be pregnant, having spotted her in the toilets earlier in the day with a pregnancy testing kit. Eventually she lets slip to Dean that she might be pregnant and goes to take the test. When she returns with the result, she finds Dean gone. Later she tells him he is off the hook, despite the fact that the test had indicated a positive result.
219	Episode 5	Mickey Jones	Gareth McLean	7 February 2024	N/A
Kim accompanies Andrew to hospital for his first session of chemotherapy after which she returns to Waterloo Road. There she welcomes back Mike who has been cleared of all wrong-doing with regard to his relationship with pupil Shola. During the journey to school in her new car Amy accidentally splashes Schuey whilst driving through a puddle. In retaliation he vandalises her car. When Amy tries to make him take responsibility for his actions he denies culpability and threatens her, whereupon she finally loses her temper. The incident filmed by another pupil is posted online and soon goes viral. Kelly Jo finally reveals to Dean that she is pregnant. His first reaction is to question the paternity of the child. Kelly Jo keeps her composure and tells him she wants nothing more to do with him. When one of Nicky's kitchen staff arrives with her baby, Tyson, she turns a blind eye. Dean and Noel chance upon the child and offer to babysit. When Tyson starts crying, the duo find themselves adept with babies, leading Dean to offer his support to Kelly Jo. Kelly Jo however has decided to have a termination. When Neil has to leave his class for a short while, Libby takes the opportunity to steal a copy of an exam paper, and offers Samia a look. Despite her misgivings, the pressure of exams is too much and Samia succumbs, only to find out later that it was the incorrect paper. That afternoon, Libby sees Coral's login password and uses it to access her laptop. When she arrives home that evening she is confronted by Amy who has figured out she is the pupil who uploaded the video.
220	Episode 6	Mickey Jones	Julia Kent	13 February 2024	N/A
With Waterloo Road firmly on the road to academy status, the teachers have to attend an inset day and the pupils are given a day off, apart from those revising for their GCSEs. Donte informs Coral that one of the suppliers to Chloe's Wishing Foundation has not been paid. Further investigation reveals a number of mysterious payments depleting the Foundation's bank account. It transpires that the transfers were made using Coral's credentials and so were not flagged as fraudulent. Coral comes to the conclusion that her laptop, where she stores all her login passwords, must have been compromised and points the finger at Amy who has had recent access to it. Amy having signalled that she is moving out of Neil's house, is outraged at the accusation. When Schuey locks Maths teacher Mr Todd in a store cupboard, the unsupervised pupils leave class and take over the staff room. Led by Libby they proceed to get drunk and run amok. Samia learns of Kelly Jo's Pregnancy from Dean and pays her friend a visit. Kelly Jo interprets this as a proxy visit from Dean in yet another attempt to make her change her mind about the termination, but asks Samia to accompany her for support. After the procedure Kelly Jo seeks out Dean to set matters straight, but discovers him with Libby, who seems quite entertained by the ensuing argument. The bank eventually informs Coral that the money transfers had been to an account in New Zealand and she finally realises who the culprit is. When Libby expresses contrition and promises to pay back the money Coral seems taken in.
221	Episode 7	Paulette Randall	Rebekah Harrison	20 February 2024	N/A
After returning from periods of suspension for their parts in the inset day trouble, Libby continues to fan the flames with Kelly Jo and Schuey finds himself confined to the Behavioural Unit. An electrical fault sees Donte checking the fuse box only to discover Tonya's cache of shoplifted items which Schuey was hoping to fence. Izzy, suspicions raised, reports Tonya's interactions with Schuey to Preston, who catches up with her in the local shop just as she is about to raid the till. She confesses and in turn Preston promises to protect her from Schuey, but he finds himself in a corner when Schuey points out that Tonya did all the shoplifting and her previous run-in with the law won't help her case. Neil finds a leaflet about the morning after pill belonging to Coral and doesn't know how to react. When he broaches the subject with Coral, the revelation that it was for his daughter Libby floors him and leaves him questioning his relationship with Coral. When Coral suggests to Libby that she comes clean to her father about the stolen foundation money, Libby refuses. Fearing the consequences of Coral spilling the beans, she throws herself down the stairs in an act of desperation and accuses Coral of pushing her. Kim, freshly returned from accompanying Andrew to hospital, interrupts Preston trying to retrieve the shoplifted goods in her office. Her instincts tell her that his confession of being the guilty party is false and the pressures of her personal and professional life overwhelm her. Tonya, having been informed by Shola about these latest developments and the likelihood of police involvement eventually owns up.
222	Episode 8	Paulette Randall	Neil Jones	26 February 2024	N/A
The sudden arrival of Mika Grainger takes Donte by surprise. Izzy, having witnessed her father and Nicky exchanging a kiss has confided in her aunt. The revelation of the relationship takes the rest of their respective children by surprise and any hopes of friendship reignited between Izzy and Tonya fizzle out rapidly. Preston receives another shock when he learns about Kai's successful application for a scholarship to an Arts College in Berlin. Kim learns the Academy Trust are offering alternative premises for the school, but with strings attached that would adversely affect the students most in need. She decides to pay Schuey a visit at his home and discovers him locked in the boot of a car, possibly as punishment by his father. Without his cooperation the staff know it will be almost impossible to help him. Just as his father arrives at the school, Schuey tries to make a run for it. Donte's intervention culminates in a violent outcome that sees Nicky run down by Mr Weever. Amy approaches Neil to show him Libby's latest essay, highlighting the fact that not only is it a work of unashamed plagiarism, but that his daughter lied about its authorship so easily. Neil eventually confronts his daughter about her many falsehoods and with the threat of sending her back to New Zealand finally extracts the truth from her. When Andrew finds himself at the coal face teaching to cover for Coral, the pupils, more interested in his personal life than poetry, open his eyes to the fact there might be items on his bucket list he should be ticking off before it is too late. He decides to tender his resignation as Trust CEO and encourages Kim to apply for the position. At the hospital whilst visiting Nicky, Donte reluctantly agrees to let Izzy stay with Mika in Leeds for a while. As the school shuts for holidays, Joe is bewildered when Kim hints that there might be an opening for a new Head at Waterloo Road in the near future and that he should ready his CV. Kim returns to the building and finds Andrew planning a road trip across America and asks for her hand in marriage.
