= Miya Ocego =

English actress and model

- Born: 1999 or 2000 (age 25–26); England
- Education: Arden School of Theatre
- Occupations: Actress, model
- Years active: 2022–present

Miya Ocego (born 1999 or 2000) is an English actress and model. On television, she is known for her role in the BBC Three series Wreck (2022–2024). She has since appeared in the BBC One series The Jetty and Waterloo Road (2024–) from series 14.

== Early life ==
Ocego grew up in Lymm near Warrington and attended Lymm High School. She trained at the Arden School of Theatre in Manchester.

== Career ==
Ocego began her career in modelling and signed with the agency Contact ZYX.

After appearing in the Channel 4 documentary The Extraordinary Life of April Ashley, Ocego began starring as Rosie Preston, a Cher tribute act, in the BBC Three horror comedy Wreck in 2022. She would reprise her main role as Rosie in Wreck's second series in 2024. She also appeared in the Sky Atlantic drama I Hate Suzie as Alexa Dennis.

In 2024, Ocego played Jules in the BBC One thriller The Jetty, appeared in an episode of the Netflix miniseries Baby Reindeer, and joined the cast of the school drama Waterloo Road for its fourteenth series, also on BBC One, as Lois Taylor-Brown. She returned to the role in the fifteenth series.

== Personal life ==
Ocego is a trans woman and transitioned as part of an early intervention study, which she credits with saving her life.

== Filmography ==
Year	Title	Role	Notes
2022	The Extraordinary Life of April Ashley		Television documentary
2022–2024	Wreck	Rosie Preston	Main role
2022	I Hate Suzie Too	Alexa Dennis	1 episode
2024	Baby Reindeer	Waiter	1 episode
2024	The Jetty	Jules	4 episodes
2024–present	Waterloo Road	Lois Taylor-Brown	11 episodes (series 14 and 15)
2026	Bridgerton	Miss Power	2 episodes (season 4)
