= Lauren Patel =

British actress (born 2001)

- Born: 16 May 2001 (age 25); Bolton, Greater Manchester, England
- Occupation: Actress
- Years active: 2021–present

Lauren Christine Patel (born 16 May 2001) is a British actress. Her roles include Pritti Pasha in Everyone's Talking About Jamie (2021), Mukherjee in Wallace & Gromit: Vengeance Most Fowl (2024), Jas Sharma in Waterloo Road (2025), and Kacey in Small Prophets (2026).

== Biography ==
Patel was born in Bolton, Greater Manchester, and attended Smithills School and The Sixth Form Bolton. She was cast as Pritti Pasha in the 2021 Amazon Prime Video film Everyone's Talking About Jamie, having auditioned when she was 17 after seeing an advertisement requesting an actress of her age and Indian origin; in the same month as being cast, all her applications to London theatre schools were rejected. Patel's father had a cameo as her on-screen father in the film.

In June 2021, Patel was announced in the voice cast for Lloyd of the Flies, produced by Aardman Animations and airing on CITV in September of the following year. She voiced young police officer Mukherjee in Wallace & Gromit: Vengeance Most Fowl (2024), with fellow Boltonian Peter Kay voicing Chief Inspector Mackintosh.

Patel has opined that there are too few roles for British Asians in proportion to their population, and said that she was unaware of South Asian Americans in her childhood as they were rarely shown in film and television.

In January 2025, Patel was announced as the role of teacher Jas Sharma in series 15 of BBC school drama Waterloo Road. She announced in October that she had left the series. She took part in an episode of Celebrity Mastermind broadcast 31 December 2025. In 2026, she played Kacey in Mackenzie Crook's Small Prophets on the BBC.

== Filmography ==
=== Film ===
| Year | Title | Role | Notes |
|---|---|---|---|
| 2021 | Everybody's Talking About Jamie | Pritti Pasha | |
| 2022 | White Pudding Supper | Kirsty | Short films |
| 2022 | Kiddo | Peggy | Short films |
| 2024 | Wallace & Gromit: Vengeance Most Fowl | PC Mukherjee | Voice |

=== Television ===
| Year | Title | Role | Notes |
|---|---|---|---|
| 2021 | IMDb on the Scene – Interviews | Herself | Episode: "Everybody's Talking About Jamie" |
| 2021 | Celebrity Page | Herself | Series 9; Episode 5 |
| 2021 | Hollywood on Set | Herself | Series 18; Episode 46 |
| 2022–2023 | Lloyd of the Flies | PB | 49 episodes |
| 2023 | The Effects of Lying | Simran | Television film |
| 2023 | Adventures of ArachnoFly | Pea-Bean | 7 episodes |
| 2025 | Behind the Scenes at the Museum | Young Patricia | Podcast; Episode #1.3 |
| 2025 | Waterloo Road | Jas Sharma | 6 episodes |
| 2025 | Maddie + Triggs | Dust Bunny 1 | Episode: "Dust Bunnies" |
| 2025 | Celebrity Mastermind | Herself – Contestant | Series 24; Episode 8 |
| 2026–present | Small Prophets | Kacey | 6 Episodes |
