= Jo Coffey =

English actress (born 1976)

- Born: Joanna Suzanne Coffey; 26 August 1976 (age 49); Solihull, West Midlands, England
- Occupations: Comedian; actress; writer
- Years active: 2007–present
- Television: Waterloo Road

Joanna Suzanne Coffey (born 26 August 1976) is an English comedian, actress and writer. After beginning her career in stand-up comedy and performing at the Edinburgh Festival Fringe, she has since gone on to appear in various television shows including EastEnders, Avoidance, The Witcher: Blood Origin and Extraordinary. Since 2023, she has portrayed the role of Wendy Whitwell in the BBC school drama Waterloo Road.

== Life and career ==
Joanna Suzanne Coffey was born on 26 August 1976 in Solihull, West Midlands. She began her career in stand-up comedy and has performed at the Edinburgh Festival Fringe several times since 2007. Her shows include My Dad's Caravan Is Rubbish and Not 25. Coffey has dwarfism and describes herself as "the comedy circuit's fourth shortest comic". Coffey subsequently embarked on a career as an actress and appeared in the BBC soap opera EastEnders as Elspeth, a probationary officer overseeing Lucas Johnson in January 2021. In 2022, she took part in the Channel 4 comedy programme Jokes Only A...Can Tell in an episode featuring jokes told by disabled comedians. She also appeared in the BBC comedy series Avoidance as Deena, as well as portraying a dwarf in an episode of the Netflix fantasy series The Witcher: Blood Origin.

In 2023, Coffey was cast in the BBC school drama Waterloo Road as Wendy Whitwell. Her character has served as the personal assistant of headteachers Kim Campbell (Angela Griffin), Steve Savage (Jason Manford) and Stella Drake (Lindsey Coulson) respectively. The same year, she appeared in an episode of the comedy series Extraordinary as Denise, a chemist. She also appeared on Rosie Jones's Disability Comedy Extravaganza, and was a contestant on an episode of Celebrity Mastermind in which she answered questions on the Dallas character J. R. Ewing. In 2024, Coffey appeared in an episode of the spy thriller series Alex Rider as churchwarden Lisa Torrence.

== Filmography ==
Year	Title	Role	Notes	Ref.
2021	EastEnders	Elspeth	Guest role	
2022	Jokes Only A...Can Tell	Herself	Episode: "Disabled People"	
2022	Avoidance	Deena	Guest role	
2022	The Witcher: Blood Origin	Dwarf	Episode: "Of Ballads, Brawlers and Bloodied Blades"	
2023–present	Waterloo Road	Wendy Whitwell	Main role	
2023	Extraordinary	Denise the Chemist	Episode: "Dead End Job"	
2023	Rosie Jones's Disability Comedy Extravaganza	Herself	Guest	
2023	Celebrity Mastermind	Denise the Chemist	Episode: "Dead End Job"	
2024	Alex Rider	Lisa Torrence	Episode: "Shot"	
