= Zak Sutcliffe =

English actor (born 2001)

- Born: Zachary William Sutcliffe; 16 June 2001 (age 24); Bradford, West Yorkshire, England
- Occupation: Actor
- Years active: 2015–present
- Television: 4 O'Clock Club; Waterloo Road

Zachary William Sutcliffe (born 16 June 2001) is an English actor. He began his career as a child actor, appearing in the films Peter and Wendy and Grimsby. Then, following various television appearances including No Offence, Butterfly and Doctors, he was cast as Evan in the CBBC series 4 O'Clock Club. Sutcliffe has since portrayed Schumacher 'Schuey' Weever in the BBC school drama series Waterloo Road and Bobby Costello in the Channel 4 soap opera Hollyoaks, as well as film roles including Shortcut, Ali & Ava and The Last Kingdom: Seven Kings Must Die.

== Life and career ==
Sutcliffe was born on 16 June 2001 in Bradford, West Yorkshire. He grew up on the Holme Wood estate and attended Tong High School. He simultaneously attended the Yorkshire School of Acting. Aged 13, he was cast in his first professional acting roles, two films: Peter and Wendy (2015) and Grimsby (2016). Whilst auditioning for Grimsby, he did not fit any of the pre-existing character profiles, but impressed with Sutcliffe, they created a new role for him. In 2017, he was cast in the recurring role of Kim Garvey in the Channel 4 procedural series No Offence. A year later, he appeared in an episode of the BBC medical drama series Casualty, as well as two episodes of the ITV1 series Butterfly.

In 2019, Sutcliffe appeared in an episode of the BBC daytime soap opera Doctors. That same year, he was cast in the main role of Evan on the CBBC series 4 O'Clock Club. He appeared until 2020. In 2020, he starred as Reggie in the Italian horror film Shortcut. A year later, he was cast in the film Ali & Ava, which was shot locally to Sutcliffe. Also in 2021, he appeared as Tommy Bradshaw in the Channel 4 soap opera Hollyoaks. His storyline involved being a victim of physical abuse at the hands of his step-father. He next appeared in the film The Last Kingdom: Seven Kings Must Die (2023), in which he portrayed Edmund I.

In 2024, it was announced that Sutcliffe would be joining the cast of BBC's school drama series Waterloo Road. He has portrayed student Schumacher 'Schuey' Weever since the thirteenth series. His initial storyline is centred around his "bad boy" persona masking a deep history of neglect and abuse from his father. Later storylines for Sutcliffe's character have involved Schuey finding joy in Christianity, getting a stable home life from foster parents and developing a relationship with Agnes Eccleston (Niamh Blackshaw). In 2025, he returned to Hollyoaks, this time in the role of Bobby Costello. He portrayed Bobby for two episodes before his character was killed off by serial killer Jeremy Blake (Jeremy Sheffield). Prior to being cast, Sutcliffe was aware the character was to be killed off so soon and was excited to portray death scenes. At the 2025 Inside Soap Awards, Sutcliffe was nominated for accolades for his roles in both Waterloo Road and Hollyoaks. He also continues to work as a builder alongside his acting roles.

== Filmography ==
Year	Title	Role	Notes
2015	Peter and Wendy	Peter Pan	Film
2016	Grimsby	Luke	Film
2016	Sweet Maddie Stone	Tyke	Short film
2017	No Offence	Kim Garvey	Recurring role
2017	Bang	Sam	Guest role
2018	Casualty	DJ	1 episode
2018	Butterfly	Aaron	Recurring role
2019	Doctors	Darrell Christie	Episode: "The Phone"
2019–2020	4 O'Clock Club	Evan	Main role
2020	Shortcut	Reggie	Film
2021	Hollyoaks	Tommy Bradshaw	Guest role
2021	Ali & Ava	Rob	Film
2023	The Last Kingdom: Seven Kings Must Die	Edmund I	Film
2023	Youthless	Az	Short film
2023	Your Move	Joe Mainst	Short film
2024–present	Waterloo Road	Schumacher 'Schuey' Weever	Main role
2025	Hollyoaks	Bobby Costello	Guest role

== Awards and nominations ==
Year	Ceremony	Category	Nominated work	Result	Ref.
2025	Inside Soap Awards	Best Drama Star	Waterloo Road	Nominated	
2025	Inside Soap Awards	Best Newcomer	Hollyoaks	Nominated	
