= Shauna Shim =

American actor

- Born: 28 March 1979 (age 47); Miami, Florida, United States
- Occupation: Actress
- Years active: 1997–present

Shauna Shim (born 28 March 1979) is an American-born English actress.

== Early life ==
Shim was born in Miami, Florida, United States to an African-American mother and Chinese father. In 1989, when Shim was ten years old, her family moved from the US to England. Shim was raised in Nottingham, England, and trained at the Carlton Television Workshop. Her brother, Andrew Shim, is also an actor, whom she has been quoted as saying she would "love to work with".

== Career ==
She has worked in film, television and on the West End stage. Her film work has covered genres including horror (An American Haunting, 2005), comedy (Big Nothing, 2006), and independent arthouse (Dogville, 2003).

Shim has appeared in television series and dramas, including the British drama series A Thing Called Love,; the US TV series The Embassy; the Irish drama-series Legend, and Miss Drill in a children's TV series (The Worst Witch, 2017–20).

== Filmography ==
=== Film ===
Year	Title	Role	Notes
2001	Wit	Student	Television film
2003	This Little Life	Nurse Janey	Television film
2003	Octane	Paramedic	
2003	Dogville	June	
2004	Piccadilly Jim	Pett House Main	
2005	An American Haunting	Anky	
2006	Big Nothing	Melanie #1	
2011	Blind Date	Bartender	Short film
2011	Naughty	Gluttony	Short film
2011	Silver Lining	Emma	Short film
2011	Cardinal	Hen	Short film
2013	Echo	Shauna	
2019	County Lines	Briony	
2021	Growing Pains	Mrs. Johnson	Short film

=== Television ===
Year	Title	Role	Notes
1997–1998	Coping with...	Mel	Series regular; 6 episodes
1999–2000	Microsoap	Lisa	Recurring role; 9 episodes
2001	The Savages	Holly	Recurring role; 5 episodes
2002	The American Embassy	Gwen	Episode: "China Cup"
2003	Crossroads	Philomena Wise	Recurring role; 3 episodes
2004	Doctors	Joanna Parks	Episode: "Hasty Hearts"
2004	A Thing Called Love	Chantelle Staple	Series regular; 6 episodes
2005	Holby City	Ruth Evans	Episode: "Patience"
2006	Legend	Victoria	Episode: "Episode 1"
2011	Waterloo Road	DS Mitchell	Episode: "Series 7, Episode 1"
2017	Episodes	Waitress	Episode: "Series 5, Episode 3"
2017	W1A	Donna Fredericks	Episode: "Series 3, Episode 3"
2017–2020	The Worst Witch	Miss Dimity Drill	Series regular; 51 episodes
2021	Finding Alice	School Counsellor	Episode: "Episode 3"
2021–2022	Biff & Chip	Mrs. Page	Recurring role; 10 episodes
2022	The Capture	Shadow Home Secretary	Episode: "Imposter Syndrome"
2022	Somewhere Boy	Siobhan	Recurring role; 2 episodes
2023–present	Waterloo Road	Valerie Chambers	Series regular
2026	Casualty	Fleur Metcalfe	1 episode

== Stage ==
- Worker's Writes – Royal Court Theatre
- Cadillac Ranch – Soho Theatre
- Splash Hatch On The E Going Down – Donmar Warehouse Theatre
- Four – Royal Court Theatre
