= Tillie Amartey =

English actress

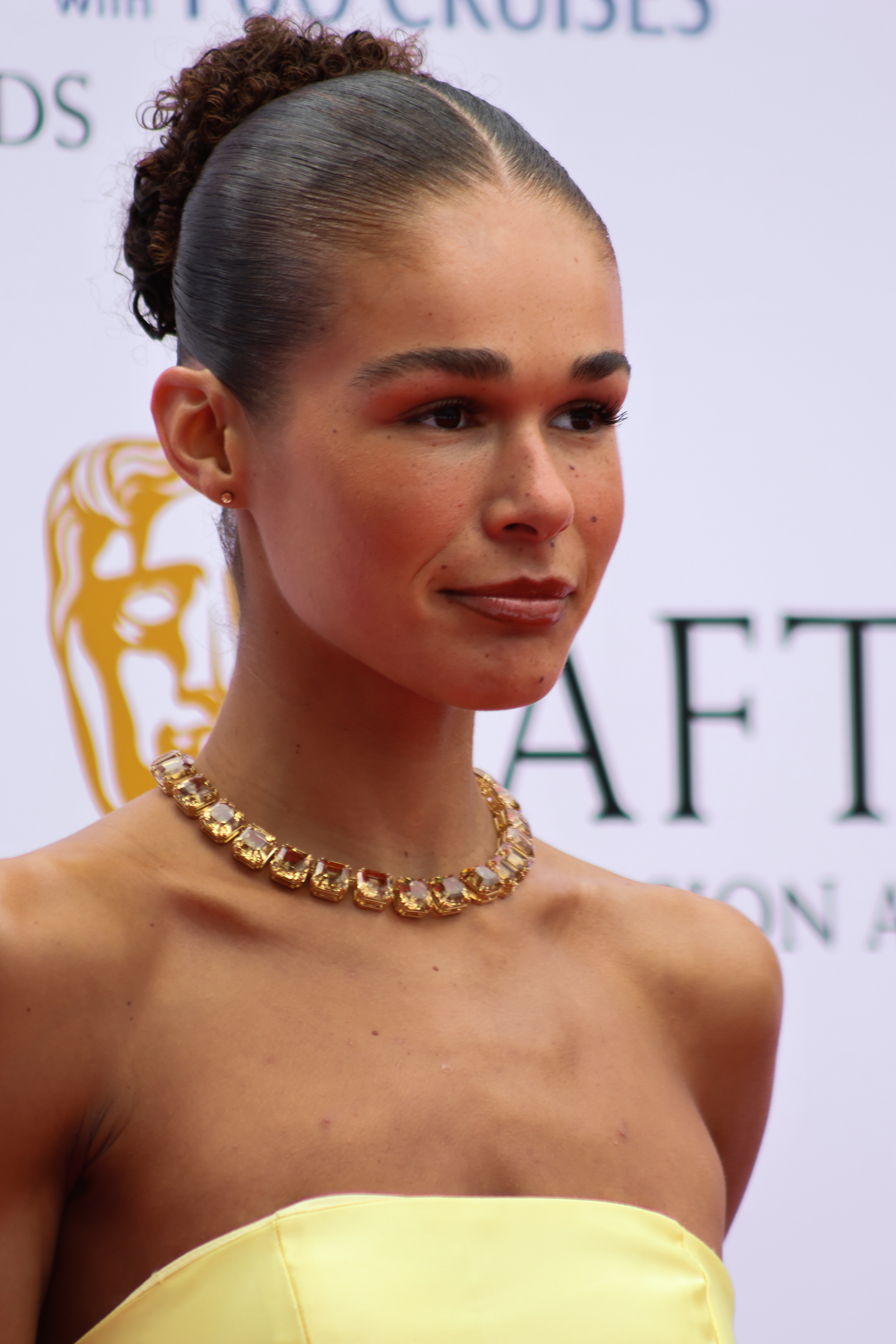
- Amartey at the 2026 British Academy Television Awards
- Born: Amatillie Thalia Amartey; 20 April 2003 (age 23); Leeds, West Yorkshire, England
- Education: RADA
- Occupations: Actress; television presenter
- Years active: 2016–present
- Television: Almost Never; Waterloo Road
- Relatives: Christian Cooke (first cousin once removed)

Amatillie Thalia Amartey (born 20 April 2003) is an English actress and presenter. After making guest appearances in various series including 4 O'Clock Club, Doctors and Creeped Out, she portrayed Chloe in the CBBC musical series Almost Never from 2019 to 2021. She then appeared in The Teacher, as well as the 2023 Strictly Come Dancing Christmas Special, before going onto play Stacey 'Stace' Neville in the BBC school drama Waterloo Road from 2024 to 2026. Amartey has also worked as a television presenter, having fronted various CBBC and CITV projects.

== Life and career ==
Amartey was born in Leeds to a Ghanaian father and an English mother. Amartey is the first cousin once removed of actor Christian Cooke. She began acting at the age of seven after attending a local drama club and has been professionally represented by an acting agent since the age of ten. She studied at St Mary's Menston Catholic Voluntary Academy, later going on to study acting at RADA.

When she was eight, Amartey was cast as Baby Nala in a touring stage production of The Lion King. However, after the first stop of the tour, Amartey began to feel homesick and her mother thought it was best for her to withdraw and wait for another role. Weeks later, she was cast in a high-profile Amazon Kindle advertisement. Amartey made her screen debut aged twelve in an episode of the CBBC series 4 O'Clock Club in 2016. She then appeared in a 2017 episode of the BBC soap opera Doctors. She commented: "I learnt a lot being involved with Doctors as it was the first soap I had done and it was filmed at a very fast pace. [...] It was an emotional episode with lots of script and a chance to show my acting skills in a very different way."

In 2019, Amartey began starring in the CBBC series Almost Never as Chloe, a role she played for three years. In 2022, she starred in the Channel 5 drama The Teacher, then began to present the CBBC show Love! Love! Love!. Amartey has also presented various projects for CITV. In 2023, Amartey competed in BBC's Strictly Come Dancing Christmas Special. Between 2024 and 2026, she appeared in the BBC school drama series Waterloo Road as Stacey 'Stace' Neville.

== Filmography ==
Year	Title	Role	Notes
2016	4 O'Clock Club	Mary	Episode: "Social Worker"
2017	Doctors	Georgia Burke	Episode: "Hoops"
2017	Ratburger	Tina Trotts	Television film
2018	Creeped Out	Arlene	Episode: "Bravery Badge"
2019–2021	Almost Never	Chloe	Main role
2020	Resolution	Kairos	Short film
2021	Moving On	Marnie	Episode: "Hungry to Learn"
2022	The Teacher	Izzy	Main role
2022	Radioman	India Vincent-Jones (voice)	Main role
2022–2023	Love! Love! Love!	Herself	Presenter
2023	Better	Jade Wilkes	Recurring role
2023	Strictly Come Dancing Christmas Special	Herself	Contestant
2024–2026	Waterloo Road	Stacey 'Stace' Neville	Main role

== Awards and nominations ==
Year	Ceremony	Category	Nominated work	Result	Ref.
2024	I Talk Telly Awards	Best Breakthrough	Waterloo Road	Won	
