= James Baxter (actor) =

English actor (born 1990)

- Born: James William Baxter; 3 August 1990 (age 36); Sunderland, Tyne and Wear, England
- Occupation: Actor
- Years active: 2007–present
- Television: Emmerdale (2007–2009); Still Open All Hours (2013–2019); Alma's Not Normal (2020–2021); Waterloo Road (2023–present)
- Partner: Chelsea Halfpenny (2018–present)
- Children: 1

James William Baxter (born 3 August 1990) is an English actor known for his roles as Jake Doland in Emmerdale, Anthony in Alma's Not Normal, Leroy in Still Open All Hours and Jesus in Red Dwarf. Since 2023, he has portrayed deputy head teacher Joe Casey in Waterloo Road.

== Early life ==
Baxter was born and brought up in Sunderland, Tyne and Wear and educated at Farringdon Community Sports College. He attended weekly classes at NADA (the Northern Academy Of Dramatic Arts) held at the city's Royalty Theatre. Whilst there, he appeared in various productions, including Some Like It Hot and the pantomime Aladdin (Christmas 2006).

== Career ==
=== Stage ===
In the Fiona Evans stage play Scarborough at the 2007 Edinburgh Festival, his performance as a teenager embarking upon an illicit affair with his PE Teacher won him a best-actor nomination for a Festival Fringe Award, and favourable reviews.

He has played in the North East musical Fine Fine Fine based on a story by Denise Robertson.

Baxter created the role of Bruce Blakemore in Silk Road by Alex Oates at Assembly Studios as part of the Edinburgh Festival 2014.

=== Television ===
In 2007, Baxter landed the role of Jake Doland, in the long running ITV soap opera Emmerdale. Baxter left the soap in 2009, together with his on-screen family, at the conclusion of their storyline. In 2012, Baxter played Jesus (of Caesarea) in the episode "Lemons" of the sci-fi sitcom Red Dwarf. He also had a bit part in the BBC's The Revenge Files of Alistair Fury, filmed on Tyneside, and played Alan Maddison in the ITV World War II drama Joe Maddison's War. In November 2013, he joined the cast of Hebburn as a guest in series two.

Since 2013, Baxter has played the role of Leroy in the BBC One series Still Open All Hours, the revival series of Open All Hours. In 2021, Baxter played the role of Anthony in Alma's Not Normal on BBC2.

In 2022, Baxter was cast as Joe Casey in the new series of Waterloo Road.

=== Radio ===
Imaginary Boys: As part of BBC Radio 4's Afternoon Play strand, Baxter played 17-year-old schoolboy David in a Paul Magrs play. David is followed by, and falls in love with, an alien called Lawrence. Lawrence is a noveliser from Verbatim 6, a species that is also featured in Magrs' Big Finish audio book Find and Replace and Ringpullworld.

== Filmography ==
Year	Title	Role	Notes
2007–2009	Emmerdale	Jake Doland	91 episodes
2008	The Revenge Files of Alistair Fury	Andy	1 episode
2008	The Royal	Simon Watts	1 episode
2008	The Harvest	Ryan	Short Film
2010	Joe Maddison's War	Alan Maddison	TV Film
2011	Doctors	David Culmel	1 episode
2011	Darlo Til I Die	Ian Carter	Short Film
2012	Love Life	PC Paul/Paul	2 episodes
2012	Red Dwarf	Jesus	1 episode
2013	Music Land World	Sam	Short Film
2013	Doctors	Noah Drummond	1 episode
2013	Hebburn	Ralph	1 episode
2013	Imaginary Boys	David Taylor	Film
2013–2019	Still Open All Hours	Leroy	Main Cast (41 episodes)
2014	Comedy Playhouse	Walter	1 episode
2014	Harriet's Army	Stephen Croft	Mini-series
2015	The National Phobia Association's Annual Day Out	Dan	Short Film
2016	Wrong Way Forward	Callum	Short Film
2016	Match Not Found	Gary	3 episodes
2019	The Beach House	James	Short Film
2021	Wolfe	David	1 episode
2021	Alma's Not Normal	Anthony	6 episodes
2021	The Witcher	Young Vesemir	1 episode
2023–present	Waterloo Road	Joe Casey	Main Cast (54 episodes)
2025	Death in Paradise	Gavin Bradbury	1 episode
2026	Forever Home	Patrick Tanner	6 episodes

== Personal life ==
In 2018, he began dating actress Chelsea Halfpenny, and they announced their engagement on 13 June 2021. In April 2023, Baxter and Halfpenny announced that they were expecting their first child together. In June 2023, Halfpenny announced the birth of her and Baxter's daughter.
