= Tom Wells (actor) =

English actor

- Occupation: Actor
- Years active: 2009–present

Tom Wells is an English actor. Wells has acted in several television series including Doctors (2016–2017), EastEnders (2019–2020), Bancroft (2020) and Waterloo Road (2024–2025).

== Career ==
in 2012 Wells made his professional acting debut in the film Betsy & Leonard (2012), as well as appearing in various short films across that time period. 2016 saw Wells' first mainstream television role after he was cast in the recurring role of Max Bauman in the BBC soap opera Doctors. He appeared until 2017. In 2019, He was cast as villain Leo King on fellow BBC soap opera EastEnders. His character is the son of paedophile Tony King (Chris Coghill), a man who abused Whitney Dean (Shona McGarty) as a child. His storyline climaxed in Leo's death at the hands of Whitney, following him becoming obsessed with her and living in her attic to spy on her.

After EastEnders, Wells appeared in the second series of ITV1's Bancroft in 2020. Later that year, he starred in the web series Crying Out Loud. Then in 2024, he was cast as maths teacher Marc Todd in BBC's Waterloo Road.

== Filmography ==
Year	Title	Role	Notes
2012	Betsy & Leonard	Rory	Film
2014	Maestra	Andy	Short film
2015	Broken Eden	Pallas	Short film
2015	Detach	Samm	Short film
2016	Bridge High	Doctor Roberts	Main role
2016	Bearable	Jack (voice)	Film
2016–2017	Doctors	Max Bauman	Recurring role
2017	Hunted	Jake	Short film
2017	Habit	News Reporter	Short film
2017	Angst	Brother	Short film
2019	Solus	Cobb	Short film
2019	Cult	Daniel Love	Short film
2019	6 Underground	Ranger Lieutenant Richardson	Film
2019–2020	EastEnders	Leo King	Regular role
2020	Bancroft	Adam Mullen	Recurring role
2020	Murder in the Carpark	Alistair Morgan	Main role
2020	Crying Out Loud	Thom	Main role
2024–2025	Waterloo Road	Marc Todd	Recurring role
