= Waterloo Road series 17 =

Waterloo Road
- Series 17
- Starring: Lindsey Coulson; James Baxter; Jo Coffey; Neil Fitzmaurice; Saira Jackson; Kym Marsh; Christopher Jeffers; Rachel Leskovac; Jon Richardson; Shauna Shim; Adam Thomas; Denise Welch; Jason Merrells
- No. of episodes: 8

Release
- Original network: BBC One; BBC iPlayer
- Original release: 6 January – 27 January 2026

Series chronology
- ← Previous; Series 16

The seventeenth series of the British television drama series Waterloo Road commenced airing on 6 January 2026, and concluded on 27 January 2026. The series comprised 8 episodes.

== Production ==
Series 17 was announced in August 2024. In December 2025, further details around the series was revealed, with 8 episodes commissioned for the seventeenth series, it also confirmed that Series 17 would premiere on 6 January 2026, with the full series being released on BBC iPlayer prior to transmission.

=== Casting ===
The majority of series regulars from the sixteenth series reprised their roles for this series, these included Lindsey Coulson, James Baxter, Jo Coffey, Saira Choudhry, Neil Fitzmaurice, Christopher Jeffers, Rachel Leskovac, Kym Marsh, Jason Merrells, Shauna Shim, and Adam Thomas, portraying Stella Drake, Joe Casey, Wendy Whitwell, Nisha Chandra, Neil Guthrie, Mitch Swift, Coral Walker, Nicky Walters, Jack Rimmer, Valerie Chambers, and Donte Charles. Ryan Clayton, who plays Mike Rutherford appears as part of the guest cast, having appeared as a regular in the previous series.

In November 2024, it was heavily speculated that Denise Welch would reprise her role as Steph Haydock in the series, a role that Welch portrayed between the first and sixth series respectively. In October 2025, her return was officially confirmed by her appearance in a trailer promoting the next series, attached to the end of the sixteenth series.

Additionally, Hollie-Jay Bowes, Liam Scholes, Kerry Howard reprise their recurring roles as Debs Rafferty, Noel McManus, and Serena-Michelle Davies from previous series. Denise Black returns in a guest role as Noel's grandmother Mo, while Karl Davies debuts as Anthony Walters, Nicky's ex and Tonya's father.

Returning Students include Fintan Buckard as Stella's grandson Ben Drake, Scarlett Thomas and Cory McClane as Donte's children Izzy Charles and Ashton Stone, Summer Violet Bird as Nicky's daughter Tonya Walters, and Hattie Dynevor and Lucy Chambers as Neil's daughters Libby and Cat Guthrie. Other returning students include Chiamaka Ulebor, Zak Sutcliffe, Maisie Robinson, Tillie Amartey, Miya Ocego, Sonya Nisa, Aabay Noor Ali, Danny Murphy, Niamh Blackshaw, Alfie Corbett, and Teddy Wallwork as Shola Aku, school troublemaker Schumacher 'Schuey' Weever, his sister Portia Weever, Stacey 'Stace' Neville, Lois Taylor-Brown, Aleena Qureshi, Mollie 'Mog' Richardson, Luca Smith, Agnes Eccleston, Forrest Sumi, and Declan Brown. New Students include Freddy Smith, Olivia Booth-Ford, Myra-Sofia Iftikhar, Sana Ali, and Isha Kaur as Freddie Hollister, Leoni Tennant, Aisha Azzi, Badr Azzi, and Harleen Lamba.

=== Scheduling ===
The seventeenth series commenced airing on BBC One on 6 January 2026. As with the previous series, two episodes aired the same night each week. As with all previous series of the revival, all episodes were released on BBC iPlayer prior to transmission.

== Cast and characters ==
=== Main cast ===
- Lindsey Coulson as Dame Stella Drake; Headteacher
- James Baxter as Joe Casey; Deputy Head and languages teacher
- Jo Coffey as Wendy Whitwell; PA to Headteacher
- Neil Fitzmaurice as Neil Guthrie; History teacher
- Saira Jackson as Nisha Chandra; Deputy Head and Maths and Science Teacher
- Christopher Jeffers as Mitch Swift; Special educational needs (SEND) coordinator
- Jon Richardson as Darius Donovan; Deputy Head and Media studies teacher
- Shauna Shim as Valerie Chambers; Music teacher
- Adam Thomas as Donte Charles; PE teacher
- Denise Welch as Steph Haydock; Supply teacher (episodes 2 and 7)
- Kym Marsh as Nicky Walters; Behavioural Lead (episodes 3–6)
- Rachel Leskovac as Coral Walker; Head of English teacher (from episode 7)
- Jason Merrells as Jack Rimmer; former school counsellor and headteacher (from episode 7)

=== Students ===
- Scarlett Thomas as Izzy Charles
- Summer Violet Bird as Tonya Walters
- Chiamaka Ulebor as Shola Aku
- Hattie Dynevor as Libby Guthrie
- Zak Sutcliffe as Schumacher 'Schuey' Weever
- Tillie Amartey as Stacey 'Stace' Neville
- Maisey Robinson as Portia Weever
- Aabay Noor Ali as Mollie 'Mog' Richardson
- Sonya Nisa as Aleena Qureshi
- Miya Ocego as Lois Taylor-Brown
- Danny Murphy as Luca Smith
- Lucy Chambers as Cat Guthrie
- Niamh Blackshaw as Agnes Eccleston
- Alfie Corbett as Forest Sumi
- Teddy Wallwork as Declan Brown
- Cory McClane as Ashton Stone
- Fintan Buckard as Ben Drake
- Freddy Smith as Freddie Hollister
- Olivia Booth-Ford as Leoni Tennant
- Myra-Sofia Iftikhar as Aisha Azzi
- Sana Ali as Badr Azzi
- Isha Kaur as Harleen Lamba

=== Recurring ===
- Kerry Howard as Serena Michelle Davies; CEO of Lowry Academies Trust
- Hollie-Jay Bowes as Debs Rafferty; School cleaner and Nicky's sister
- Liam Scholes as Noel McManus; School canteen assistant
- Karl Davies as Anthony Walters; Football coach and Tonya's father

=== Guest ===
- Ryan Clayton as Mike Rutherford, Waterloo Road police officer (episode 6)
- Denise Black as Mo McManus, Noel's grandmother (episode 8)

== Episodes ==
No. in series	Title	Directed by	Written by	Original release date	UK viewers (millions)
247	Episode 1	Lloyd Eyre-Morgan	Katie Douglas	6 January 2026	N/A
248	Episode 2	Lloyd Eyre-Morgan	Jessica Barnes	6 January 2026	N/A
249	Episode 3	Christiana Ebohon-Green	Tom Wentworth	13 January 2026	N/A
250	Episode 4	Christiana Ebohon-Green	Davey Jones & Eve Steele	13 January 2026	N/A
251	Episode 5	Claire Tailyour	Kellie Smith	20 January 2026	N/A
252	Episode 6	Claire Tailyour	Julia Kent	20 January 2026	N/A
253	Episode 7	John Maidens	Neil Jones	27 January 2026	N/A
254	Episode 8	John Maidens	Jayshree Patel	27 January 2026	N/A
