= The Other One (2017 TV series) =

British television series

- Genre: Sitcom
- Created by: Holly Walsh
- Written by: Holly Walsh; Pippa Brown
- Directed by: Holly Walsh
- Starring: Ellie White; Lauren Socha; Rebecca Front; Siobhan Finneran
- Composer: Vince Pope
- Country of origin: United Kingdom
- Original language: English
- No. of series: 2
- No. of episodes: 12

Production
- Executive producers: Pippa Brown; Holly Walsh
- Producer: Pippa Brown
- Camera setup: Multi-camera
- Production company: Tiger Aspect Productions

Original release
- Network: BBC
- Release: 13 September 2017 – 6 May 2022

The Other One is a British television comedy series broadcast on BBC One, written and directed by Holly Walsh and starring Ellie White, Lauren Socha, Rebecca Front and Siobhan Finneran.

== Plot ==
The sitcom follows young Catherine "Cathy" Walcott (Ellie White) and her half-sister, Catherine "Cat" Walcott (Lauren Socha), who had no idea of each other's existence until their father's untimely death at a birthday party.

== Production ==
Walsh was inspired to write the sitcom after hearing a true story about a man with two families who gave his kids the same name to avoid confusion or being sprung.

== Cast ==
- Ellie White as Catherine "Cathy" Walcott, a woman who finds out she has a half-sister with the same name after her father's death
- Lauren Socha as Catherine "Cat" Walcott, Cathy's younger half-sister, who is introduced to her at her father's funeral
- Rebecca Front as Tess Walcott, Cathy's mother and the widow of Colin
- Siobhan Finneran as Marilyn, Colin's eccentric mistress and the mother of Cat; she suffered from agoraphobia
- Amit Shah as Marcus Tandell, Cathy's ex-fiancé
- Simon Greenall as Colin Walcott, Cathy and Cat's late father
- Caroline Quentin as Auntie Dawn, Tess' sister
- Shobu Kapoor as Mishti Tandell, Marcus' mother
- Silas Carson as Shray Tandell, Marcus' father
- Tessie Orange-Turner as Claire, Cathy's school friend
- Neil Pearson as Paul
- Stephen Tompkinson as Mr Shipham
- Maddie Rice as Meredith, Marcus' lover
- Sarah Kendall as the real estate agent (Series 1)
- Christopher Jeffers as Callum (Series 2)
- Michele Austin as Angela, Callum's mother (Series 2)
- Lolly Adefope as Pretty Cathy, one of Cathy’s old school friends (Series 2)

== Episodes ==
Series	Episodes	Originally released
Pilot		13 September 2017
1	6	5 June 2020
2	5	6 May 2022

=== Pilot (2017) ===
Title	Directed by	Written by	Original release date
"Pilot"	Dan Zeff	Holly Walsh	13 September 2017
Colin Walcott dies at his surprise birthday party, where his wife Tess and daughter Cathy find out about his other wife and daughter. Cat and Cathy are polar opposites but eventually bond when deciding where to scatter his ashes.

=== Series 1 (2020) ===
No. overall	No. in series	Title	Directed by	Written by	Original release date
2	1	"Episode 1"	Holly Walsh	Pippa Brown & Holly Walsh	5 June 2020
Cathy and Cat cannot find their dad's will and, at their joint birthday party, their mums war over which family their dead dad loved most.
3	2	"Episode 2"	Holly Walsh	Pippa Brown & Holly Walsh	5 June 2020
Cathy is forced to take compassionate leave from work but can't bear to tell Tess, so Cat lets Cathy hide at her house and throws her a party to cheer her up.
4	3	"Episode 3"	Holly Walsh	Pippa Brown & Holly Walsh	5 June 2020
Cathy proposes they get Colin a memorial bench but, as Cat doesn't have the money, she has to improvise. Cathy also agrees to teach Cat how to ride a bike, with disastrous results.
5	4	"Episode 4"	Holly Walsh	Pippa Brown & Holly Walsh	5 June 2020
With her mum refusing to go, Cathy's hen do invitees are Auntie Dawn, Marilyn, Cat and an old school friend. It doesn't turn out to be the classy, edifying affair Cathy wanted.
6	5	"Episode 5"	Holly Walsh	Pippa Brown & Holly Walsh	5 June 2020
It's the night before the wedding but Cathy can't enjoy her drink-up as she's obsessed by a scuff on the wall Marcus made, and the sisters run into Cat's old school bully.
7	6	"Episode 6"	Holly Walsh	Pippa Brown & Holly Walsh	5 June 2020
Cat decides to take Cathy on their own sister honeymoon to cheer her up. Marilyn finds Colin's missing will and, together with Tess, they need to tell the girls the shocking news.

=== Series 2 (2022) ===
No. overall	No. in series	Title	Directed by	Written by	Original release date
8	1	"Episode 1"	Holly Walsh	Pippa Brown & Holly Walsh	6 May 2022
Having finally come to terms with the fact that they are sisters, Cathy and Cat are now reeling from the news that they also have a brother, Callum - and that Cathy has just snogged him.
9	2	"Episode 2"	Holly Walsh	Pippa Brown & Holly Walsh	6 May 2022
Cat feuds with a rival delivery driver, and Cathy loses a fight with a washbasin at work. Tess’s singles holiday is a disaster, while Angela becomes Marilyn’s house guest from hell.
10	3	"Episode 3"	Holly Walsh	Pippa Brown & Holly Walsh	6 May 2022
Cat and Cathy go to an adult maths GCSE class where the sexy teacher causes ructions. Tess takes a job in the worst place possible, and Angela resorts to kidnap to win back Peter.
11	4	"Episode 4"	Holly Walsh	Pippa Brown & Holly Walsh	6 May 2022
Cathy is excited to introduce her siblings to lambing season at Auntie Dawn’s farm, but Tess brings along an unwelcome visitor and Cat brings an unwise gift.
12	5	"Episode 5"	Holly Walsh	Pippa Brown & Holly Walsh	6 May 2022
In a bid to heal his rift with Angela, Callum is lured to an eventful Northern Soul Revival. Next day, their Dad Colin still has surprises for his family from beyond the grave.

== Reception ==
Critic Emily Baker in the i newspaper gave the first episode four stars and commented on the “stellar acting”.
