= Characters of the Marvel Cinematic Universe: A–L =

== A ==
=== Ajak ===
Ajak (portrayed by Salma Hayek) is the wise and spiritual leader of the Eternals, who possesses healing abilities and functions as the "bridge" between the Eternals and the Celestial Arishem. Based on this dynamic, Ajak is aware that the Emergence will occur, and she decides to try to stop it in the present day based on her growing love for humanity. However, fellow Eternal Ikaris sees this as betrayal and leads her to be killed by the Deviants, with Sersi becoming the new bridge to Arishem.

Hayek was originally hesitant when she was offered the role, assuming she would only have a role as a supporting character of "grandmother". Ajak's comic-book counterpart is male, and Hayek stated that making the change to female allowed her to lean into the character's femininity as a "mother figure" to the rest of the Eternals.

As of 2026, the character has appeared in one project: the film Eternals (2021).

=== Algrim / Kurse ===
Algrim (portrayed by Adewale Akinnuoye-Agbaje), also known as Kurse, is a Dark Elf, and Malekith's lieutenant. He is one of the few Dark Elves who survived the catastrophe that almost wiped out their race. He possesses enhanced strength and durability due to having been augmented by the Kurse Stone, enabling him to survive blows from Mjolnir, although Loki kills him with a black hole grenade.

As of 2026, the character has appeared in one project: the film Thor: The Dark World (2013).

=== John Allerdyce / Pyro ===
John Allerdyce (portrayed by Aaron Stanford), also known as Pyro, is a pyrokinetic mutant in the Void who works for Cassandra Nova.

As of 2026, the character has appeared in one project: the film Deadpool & Wolverine (2024). Stanford reprises his role from 20th Century Fox's X-Men film series.

=== Ammit ===
Ammit (motion-captured by Sofia Danu, voiced by Saba Mubarak) is an imprisoned Egyptian goddess that resembles a humanoid version of her classical depiction whom Arthur Harrow plans to release. Ammit is known as "The Devourer of the Dead" and plans to cast her preemptive judgement on all of humanity. She is successfully released by Harrow and grants him as her avatar. They begin her plan, but are stopped by the combined efforts of Marc Spector, Steven Grant, Layla El-Faouly, and Khonshu. Ammit is then trapped inside Harrow's body to permanently kill them both. Marc refuses and is released from his servitude, but Khonshu has Jake Lockley carry out the assassination. She is based on the Egyptian deity of the same name.

As of 2026, the character has appeared in one project: the Disney+ series Moon Knight (2022).

=== Ancient One ===
The Ancient One (portrayed by Tilda Swinton) is the former Sorcerer Supreme and mentor of Stephen Strange who is killed by Kaecilius.

An earlier version of the Ancient One is met by a time traveling Bruce Banner at the New York Sanctum while looking for the Time Stone.

In the comics, the character is a Tibetan man, while the film version is an androgynous Celtic. Swinton's casting was widely criticized as whitewashing. Director Scott Derrickson and co-writer C. Robert Cargill wanted to avoid adapting the character as portrayed in the comics, as they felt it was perpetuating Asian Fu Manchu stereotypes from the time period, while also aggravating the Tibetan sovereignty debate. Derrickson initially wanted to change the character to an Asian woman, but he felt that this would either invoke the Dragon Lady stereotype or Asian fetishism, depending on the age of the actress. He also wanted to avoid the stereotype of a "Western character coming to Asia to learn about being Asian," so he ultimately decided to cast a non-Asian actor in the role. Swinton was cast because Derrickson felt that she could play the "domineering, secretive, ethereal, enigmatic, [and] mystical" side of the character. Swinton also chose to portray the character as androgynous, though using female pronouns. Derrickson said he was pleased with the diversity of the film's cast, in terms of both gender and ethnicity, but acknowledged that "Asians have been whitewashed and stereotyped in American cinema for over a century and people should be mad or nothing will change. What I did was the lesser of two evils, but it is still an evil." Looking back at the casting in May 2021, Feige said the studio thought they were being "so smart and so cutting-edge" when they avoided the wise old Asian man stereotype, but the criticism of the casting was a wake-up call that made them realize they could have cast an Asian actor in the role without falling into stereotypes.

As of 2026, the character has appeared in two projects: the films Doctor Strange (2016) and Avengers: Endgame (2019). Alternate universe variants of the Ancient One appeared in two projects: the film Avengers: Endgame; and the Disney+ animated series What If...? (2021–2024).

=== Aneka ===
Aneka (portrayed by Michaela Coel) is a Wakandan warrior and member of the Dora Milaje. Aneka later takes upon the mantle of the Midnight Angels, along with Okoye. Aneka is additionally romantically involved with Ayo.

As of 2026, the character has appeared in one project: the film Black Panther: Wakanda Forever (2022).

=== Arishem ===
Arishem (voiced by David Kaye) is a Celestial who created the Deviants, and later the Eternals once the Deviants rebelled against their programming. He communicates with only one member of a given group of ten Eternals: on Earth, this is Ajak, and later Sersi after Ajak's death. After the Emergence is stopped, Arishem takes Sersi, Phastos, and Kingo away for judgement, vowing to spare Earth only if their memories show that humanity is worth sparing.

As of 2026, the character has appeared in one project: the film Eternals. An alternate universe variant of Arishem appeared in one project: the Disney+ animated series What If...?.

=== Asha ===
Asha (voiced by Erica Luttrell) is an enthusiastic Wakandan citizen who interns at Oscorp in an alternate universe. She later leaves Oscorp to join Harry Osborn's Worldwide Engineering Brigade (W.E.B.).

As of 2026, the character has appeared in one project: the Disney+ animated series Your Friendly Neighborhood Spider-Man (2025–present).

=== Attuma ===
Attuma (portrayed by Alex Livinalli) is a warrior from the underwater kingdom of Talokan and a close ally of its king, Namor.

As of 2026, the character has appeared in one project: the film Black Panther: Wakanda Forever. He will return in the film Avengers: Doomsday (2026).

=== Hector Ayala / White Tiger ===
Hector Ayala (portrayed by Kamar de los Reyes), also known as White Tiger, is a vigilante operating in New York City whose powers come from the mystical Amulet of Power. He is accused of assaulting and killing an undercover cop named Shanahan and is represented by Matt Murdock as his lawyer. With new testimony and police records detailing Hector's exploits, Murdock and McDuffie convince the jury to find him innocent on all charges. While on patrol as the White Tiger, Hector is murdered by Cole North. Later, Hector's niece, Angela del Toro, takes on the mantle of White Tiger to honor his memory.

As of 2026, the character has appeared in one project: the Disney+ series Daredevil: Born Again (2025–2027).

=== Soledad Ayala ===
Soledad Ayala (portrayed by Ashley Marie Ortiz) is a nurse and the wife of vigilante Hector Ayala / White Tiger, who is killed by Cole North in 2027, leaving Soledad a widow. Months later, she is unjustly arrested by the Anti-Vigilante Task Force (AVTF) of New York City Mayor Wilson Fisk and illegally detained at the Red Hook port, but is rescued along with other prisoners by Daredevil and Karen Page, with the help of Soledad's niece, Angela del Toro.

As of 2026, the character has appeared in one project: the Disney+ series Daredevil: Born Again.

=== Ayesha ===
Ayesha (portrayed by Elizabeth Debicki) is the high priestess of the golden-skinned Sovereign race, one of the races created by the High Evolutionary. She hires the Guardians of the Galaxy to protect Anulax Batteries from an Abilisk, but sends her Omnicraft fleet to execute them soon after as a result of Rocket stealing several of the batteries with the intention to later sell them. When the fleet is destroyed during the battle on Ego, Ayesha decides to create Adam to hunt down the Guardians. In 2026, she is forced to awaken Adam prematurely while forced by the High Evolutionary to assist him in tracking down Rocket. She is killed when Counter-Earth is destroyed.

As of 2026, the character has appeared in two projects: the films Guardians of the Galaxy Vol. 2 (2017) and Guardians of the Galaxy Vol. 3 (2023). An alternate universe variant of Ayesha appeared in one project: the Disney+ animated series What If...?.

=== Ayo ===
Ayo (portrayed by Florence Kasumba) is the second-in-command of the Dora Milaje in Wakanda. She is promoted to being the general of the Dora Milaje after Okoye is removed. She is also shown to be in a romantic relationship with Aneka.

As of 2026, the character has appeared in five projects: the films Captain America: Civil War (2016) (cameo), Black Panther (2018), Avengers: Infinity War (2018), and Black Panther: Wakanda Forever; and the Disney+ series The Falcon and the Winter Soldier (2021).

== B ==
=== Nakia Bahadir ===
Nakia Bahadir (portrayed by Yasmeen Fletcher) is Kamala Khan's close friend, and is a student at Coles Academic High School. Torn between her American lifestyle and her Muslim beliefs, she decided to run to become a board member of the Islamic Masjid of Jersey City and convey progressive ideas, which she succeeded, defending the mosque against the disrespectful incursions of the United States Department of Damage Control. Initially ignoring that Khan was the newly appeared superhero in Jersey City, Bahadir was wary of her actions, considering that it drew too much unwanted attention onto the local Muslim community. Despite being upset upon discovering the truth, she and Khan were able to reconcile, and Bahadir helped Khan fight against Damage Control to protect Kamran.

As of 2026, the character has appeared in one project: the Disney+ series Ms. Marvel (2022).

=== Clint Barton / Hawkeye / Ronin ===
==== Barton family ====
Clint Barton's family play an important role in his life. Laura Barton (portrayed by Linda Cardellini) also known as Agent 19, is a former S.H.I.E.L.D. agent and Clint's wife. Together, the couple had three children: Cooper (portrayed by Ben Sakamoto), Lila (portrayed by Ava Russo), and Nathaniel Barton (portrayed by Cade Woodward). To protect themselves, Laura and her children live in secrecy, unbeknownst to the Avengers. However, the Avengers visit the Barton farm in 2015, and Laura mentions that she is pregnant with their third child. Clint decides to retire from the Avengers to be with his family, and Laura later gives birth to Nathaniel. In 2018, she and all three Barton children become victims of the Blip, but are brought back to life in 2023. In 2024, she stays home while Clint takes the children on a trip to New York City, and later receives her old S.H.I.E.L.D. watch when Clint returns home.

As of 2026, the characters have appeared in three projects: the films Avengers: Age of Ultron (2015) and Avengers: Endgame; and the Disney+ series Hawkeye (2021).

=== Georges Batroc ===
Georges Batroc (portrayed by Georges St-Pierre) is an Algerian kickboxer, mercenary, and pirate at the top of Interpol's Red Notice, as well as a former DGSE agent who scored 36 kill missions before being demobilized by the French government. By 2024, he is the leader of the criminal group LAF. Sharon Carter accidentally reveals that she is the Power Broker to Batroc and kills him when he demands more money.

As of 2026, the character has appeared in two projects: the film Captain America: The Winter Soldier (2014); and the Disney+ series The Falcon and the Winter Soldier. An alternate universe variant of Batroc appeared in one project: the Disney+ animated series What If...?.

=== Ruth Bat-Seraph ===
Ruth Bat-Seraph (portrayed by Shira Haas) is an Israeli former Black Widow assassin who was trained in the Red Room. After the fall of the Red Room, she becomes a high-ranking U.S. government official, acting as the security advisor to United States President Thaddeus Ross. She attends an international summit and fights Isaiah Bradley and others who attempt to assassinate Ross during the meeting. After working out that Bradley was brainwashed, she assists Sam Wilson and Joaquin Torres in stopping the person behind it: Samuel Sterns, who is attempting to destroy Ross’ legacy due to Ross enslaving him and using him for labor with a false promise to free him. After watching Ross turn into a Red Hulk, she befriends an exonerated Bradley, who buys them tickets to a basketball game.

As of 2026, the character has appeared in one project: the film Captain America: Brave New World (2025).

=== Quentin Beck / Mysterio ===
Quentin Beck (portrayed by Jake Gyllenhaal), is a former Stark Industries employee and holographic illusions specialist who masquerades as a superhero named Mysterio, who claims to be from Earth-833. He is recruited by Talos (impersonating Nick Fury) to help Spider-Man stop the Elementals, which he secretly creates through illusions as a way to get recognition for his life's work, and revenge due to his grievance at Stark Industries and by the late Tony Stark, his former employer. He is killed, but before his death, he has his associate William Ginter Riva download the drones' data and doctor the footage to frame Spider-Man for the attack in addition to Beck revealing Parker's identity to the world, and even those who had been on his side. Beck's victory over Spider-Man is later undone when Stephen Strange casts a spell to make the world forget Parker ever existed.

As of 2026, the character has appeared in one project: the film Spider-Man: Far From Home (2019). An alternate universe variant of Beck (voiced by Alejandro Saab) appeared in one project: the Disney+ animated series What If...?.

=== Kate Bishop ===
==== Bishop family ====
Derek (portrayed by Brian d'Arcy James) and Eleanor Bishop (portrayed by Vera Farmiga) are the wealthy parents of Kate Bishop. Following Derek's death during the Battle of New York, a tough financial situation had forced Eleanor, the CEO of Bishop Security, to become an associate of Wilson Fisk, cooperating with his operations in New York City, which she had to keep a secret from her daughter. When Kate started investigating the Tracksuit Mafia together with Clint Barton, Eleanor hired Yelena Belova and put a bounty on Barton's head. Eventually Eleanor realized that her daughter might be endangered, so she made a decision to quit working for Fisk. Eleanor's decision had made her the target of the Tracksuit Mafia and Fisk himself, but she was saved by Kate. Afterwards, Eleanor was arrested for the crimes that she had committed.

As of 2026, the characters have appeared in one project: the Disney+ series Hawkeye.

=== Carmilla Black ===
Carmilla Black (voiced by Anairis Quiñones) is a member of the Scorpions gang who serves as Mac Gargan's second-in-command in an alternate universe.

As of 2026, the character has appeared in one project: the Disney+ animated series Your Friendly Neighborhood Spider-Man.

=== Blade ===
Blade (voiced by Mahershala Ali) is a half-vampire "daywalker" who hunts vampires. In 2024, Blade approaches Dane Whitman and questions whether he is ready to wield the Ebony Blade.

At some point prior to 2024, a variant of Blade named Eric Brooks (portrayed by Wesley Snipes) was sent by the Time Variance Authority (TVA) to the Void, where he met and joined forces with Elektra Natchios, Remy LeBeau, Johnny Storm, and Laura against Cassandra Nova. One day, Laura brings Wade Wilson and Logan to their base. Wilson explains that he believes he can force Nova to send him and Logan back to their home universes. Blade and the others agree to join forces with Wilson and Logan to avenge their respective universes. The team sets out for Nova's base, engaging in a fight with Nova's forces. As Alioth approaches the base, Blade watches Wilson and Logan jump through a portal back to Wilson's home universe, Earth-10005, as he and rest of the team are about to be consumed by Alioth. After saving his universe, Wilson asks Hunter B-15 of the TVA to save the others in the Void, leaving Blade's fate unknown.

In an alternate timeline where a virus turned most of the world's population into zombies, Blade (voiced by Todd Williams) adopted the mantle of Moon Knight after Marc Spector was killed, becoming known as Blade Knight.

As of 2026, the character has appeared in one project: the film Eternals (uncredited voice-only cameo). He was set to return in the film Blade, but his contract expired in July 2026. Alternate universe variants of Blade appeared in three projects: the film Deadpool & Wolverine; and the Disney+ animated series What If...? (non-speaking cameo) and Marvel Zombies. Ali previously portrayed Cornell "Cottonmouth" Stokes in the Marvel Television series Luke Cage (2016–2018). Snipes reprises his role from New Line Cinema's Blade film trilogy (1998–2004).

=== Daniel Blake ===
Daniel Blake (portrayed by Michael Gandolfini) is an enthusiastic member of Wilson Fisk's mayoral campaign, a young recent college graduate who becomes his protégé. He later finds himself conflicted after discovering his friend BB Urich is making social media posts against Fisk’s administration leaking information he tells her. After refusing to turn BB over to Buck Cashman, Cashman relentlessly beats and shoots Daniel in the head, killing him.

As of 2026, the character has appeared in one project: the Disney+ series Daredevil: Born Again.

=== Johnny Blaze / Ghost Rider ===
Johnathon "Johnny" Blaze (portrayed by stuntman Tom McComas and later by Ryan Gosling), also known as the Ghost Rider, is a supernatural motorcycle-riding hero.

As of 2026, the character has appeared in one project: the Marvel Television series Agents of S.H.I.E.L.D. (2013–2020). He will return in the upcoming films Avengers: Secret Wars (2027) and Ghost Rider (2028).

=== Blind Al ===
Blind Al (portrayed by Leslie Uggams) is Wade Wilson's blind elderly roommate on Earth-10005.

As of 2026, the character has appeared in one project: the film Deadpool & Wolverine. Uggams reprises her role from 20th Century Fox's X-Men film series.

=== Emil Blonsky / Abomination ===
Emil Blonsky (portrayed by Tim Roth), also known as the Abomination, is a British Royal Marine who is transformed into an atrocious humanoid creature with enhanced physiology and a deformed appearance as a result of being injected with an experimental version of the Super Soldier Serum, in conjunction with subsequent exposure to intense gamma radiation much like Bruce Banner himself years prior.

S.H.I.E.L.D. was initially in charge of keeping Blonsky detained, in a cryo cell in Alaska; Phil Coulson once threatened to send Grant Ward to work there. Following S.H.I.E.L.D.'s collapse, Damage Control took over detaining him and placed Blonsky in a supermax prison in California. Post-Blip, Blonsky had gained control of himself on multiple levels, mellowing out and regaining his human form; after 14 years imprisoned, he was looking for parole. He asked for Jennifer Walters to be his lawyer and befriended her. He later moved to Kamar-Taj.

As of 2026, the character has appeared in three projects: the films The Incredible Hulk (2008) and Shang-Chi and the Legend of the Ten Rings (2021); and the Disney+ series She-Hulk: Attorney at Law (2022). An alternate universe variant of Blonsky appeared in one project: the Disney+ animated series Marvel Zombies (2025–present).

=== Jeri and Roz Blood / Blood Siblings ===
Jeri (portrayed by Zoe Terakes) and Roz Blood (portrayed by Shakira Barrera), also known as the Blood Siblings, are former athletes-turned-street fighters which were hired to work as enforcers for Parker Robbins's gang.

As of 2026, the characters have appeared in one project: the Disney+ series Ironheart (2025). Barrera previously portrayed Agent King in the Marvel Television series Agents of S.H.I.E.L.D.

=== Elsa Bloodstone ===
Elsa Bloodstone (portrayed by Laura Donnelly) is the estranged daughter of Ulysses Bloodstone who dislikes her family's tradition of hunting monsters.

As of 2026, the character has appeared in one project: the Disney+ special Werewolf by Night (2022).

==== Bloodstone family ====
Ulysses Bloodstone (voiced by Richard Dixon) is Elsa Bloodstone's deceased monster-hunting father who originally wielded the Bloodstone and whose corpse was converted into an animatronic after his death. Verussa Bloodstone (portrayed by Harriet Sansom Harris) is a monster hunter, Ulysses' widow, and Elsa's stepmother. After her husband dies, she becomes the leader of his group of monster hunters.

As of 2026, the characters have appeared in one project: the Disney+ special Werewolf by Night.

=== Ralph Bohner ===
Ralph Bohner (portrayed by Evan Peters) is a Westview, New Jersey resident whom Agatha Harkness forces to impersonate Wanda Maximoff's twin brother Pietro. Harkness possesses him, imbuing him with Pietro's super-speed and making him play the role in order to discover how Wanda created her alternate reality. He is initially introduced as the unseen husband of "Agnes" (Harkness's alias), who was frequently mentioned whenever Agnes needed a punchline for a laugh line. He is freed from Harkness's control when Monica Rambeau removes a magical necklace he was wearing. Three years later, he meets with William Kaplan and his boyfriend Eddie to reveal to them what happened in Westview and how Harkness controlled him. The role was a nod to Peters's character Peter Maximoff in 20th Century Fox's X-Men film series. According to series director Jac Schaeffer, Bohner's character is a reference to the disappointment suffered by MCU fans in Iron Man 3 who were expecting Iron Man's true nemesis Mandarin in Trevor Slattery.

As of 2026, the character has appeared in two projects: the Disney+ series WandaVision (2021) and Agatha All Along (2024).

=== Blackagar Boltagon / Black Bolt ===
Blackagar Boltagon (portrayed by Anson Mount), also known as Black Bolt, is the Head of the Inhuman Royal Family and King of Attilan, whose voice can cause destruction with the slightest whisper.

On Earth-838, Black Bolt is a member of the Illuminati who is killed by Wanda Maximoff after she alters reality to remove his mouth. Upon this realization, Boltagon panics and accidentally destroys his own brain with a muffled scream.

As of 2026, the character has appeared in one project: the Marvel Television series Inhumans (2017). An alternate universe variant of Black Bolt appeared in one project: the film Doctor Strange in the Multiverse of Madness (2022).

=== Mallory Book ===
Mallory Book (portrayed by Renée Elise Goldsberry) is a lawyer at Goodman, Lieber, Kurtzberg & Holliway who is threatened by Jennifer Walters becoming the new head of the superhuman law division.

As of 2026, the character has appeared in one project: the Disney+ series She-Hulk: Attorney at Law.

=== Odin Borson ===
Odin Borson (portrayed by Anthony Hopkins), also known as Odin Allfather, is the ruler of Asgard, son of Bor, biological father of Hela and Thor, adoptive father of Loki, and husband of Frigga. He is based on Odin in Norse mythology. In 2013, he is removed from power by Loki and is placed under a spell to make him forget his past life before being put into a retirement home in New York City. He manages to break free of Loki's spell before heading to Norway instead of returning to Asgard, wishing to not be disturbed. When he is found by his sons, Odin warns them that his time has come and that Hela will be freed after his death. He bids them both farewell and soon disappears. He later briefly reappears in a vision, allowing Thor to realize that releasing Surtur and prompting Ragnarok is the key to stopping Hela.

As of 2026, the character has appeared in three projects: the films Thor (2011), Thor: The Dark World, and Thor: Ragnarok (2017). Alternate universe variants of Odin (voiced by Jeff Bergman) appeared in one project: the Disney+ animated series What If...?.

=== Eli Bradley ===
Elijah "Eli" Bradley (portrayed by Elijah Richardson) is the grandson of Isaiah Bradley.

As of 2026, the character has appeared in one project: the Disney+ series The Falcon and the Winter Soldier.

=== Isaiah Bradley ===
Isaiah Bradley (portrayed by Carl Lumbly) is an elderly super soldier who served in the Korean War, during which time he was sent behind enemy lines to fight the brainwashed Bucky Barnes, whose metal arm he damaged. After rescuing other Black super soldiers who were being held prisoner, he was imprisoned by the U.S. government and Hydra for 30 years, experimented on, and his existence kept a secret. A nurse helped him escape by forging his death and he went into hiding. By 2024, he lives in Baltimore with his grandson Eli Bradley. He refuses to help Sam Wilson and Barnes when they seek him out, revealing his hatred for the government and contempt for the idea of a Black man becoming Captain America. Later, after Sam officially takes the title, he uses his new influence to set up a memorial and statue for Bradley in the Smithsonian Institution as part of the existing "Captain America" exhibit.

When Bradley accompanies Wilson on a visit to the White House, he seemingly attempts to shoot President Thaddeus Ross, but it is soon revealed that Bradley and others were brainwashed by Samuel Sterns as part of a conspiracy to discredit Ross. Once Sterns' role in the plot is exposed, Bradley is freed.

As of 2026, the character has appeared in two projects: the Disney+ series The Falcon and the Winter Soldier; and the film Captain America: Brave New World.

=== Ellen Brandt ===
Ellen Brandt (portrayed by Stéphanie Szostak) is a war veteran who lost her arm in battle before A.I.M. founder Aldrich Killian injects her with the Extremis virus, which grants enhanced regenerative capabilities. She and Eric Savin attack Tony Stark in Tennessee, but Stark is able to cause an explosion that sends Brandt flying into a set of power lines, fatally electrocuting her.

As of 2026, the character has appeared in one project: the film Iron Man 3 (2013).

=== Betty Brant ===
Elizabeth "Betty" Brant (portrayed by Angourie Rice) is a student at Midtown School of Science and Technology. She is Liz Allan's best friend, and host of the school's news report alongside Jason Ionello, who is implied to have an unrequited crush on her. In 2018, she is a victim of the Blip, but is restored to life in 2023. In 2024, she enters a brief relationship with Ned Leeds in Europe, maintaining a friendship after breaking up. Afterwards, she learned Spider-Man's true identity and became an unpaid intern for The Daily Bugle.

As of 2026, the character has appeared in four projects: the films Spider-Man: Homecoming (2017), Spider-Man: Far From Home, and Spider-Man: No Way Home (2021); and the web series The Daily Bugle (2019–2022).

=== Jackson Brice / Shocker ===
Jackson Brice (portrayed by Logan Marshall-Green) is a member of Adrian Toomes' criminal enterprise who wields a modified version of Brock Rumlow's vibro-blast emitting gauntlet and calls himself the "Shocker". After a weapons deal with Aaron Davis attracts Spider-Man's attention, Toomes fires him for his recklessness, to which Brice threatens to expose their operation. In response, Toomes fires one of Phineas Mason's weapons at Brice to intimidate him, but inadvertently disintegrates him instead. Following this, Toomes gives his vibro-gauntlet and the mantle of "Shocker" to fellow associate Herman Schultz.

As of 2026, the character has appeared in one project: the film Spider-Man: Homecoming.

=== Eddie Brock / Venom ===
As of 2026, an alternate universe variant of Edward "Eddie" Brock, a reporter bonded to an alien symbiote known as Venom, has appeared in one project: the film Spider-Man: No Way Home (portrayed by Tom Hardy). Another variant will be introduced in the Disney+ animated series Your Friendly Neighborhood Spider-Man (voiced by Josh Keaton). Hardy reprises his role from Sony's Spider-Man Universe (SSU).

=== Broker ===
The Broker (portrayed by Christopher Fairbank) is a merchant established on Xandar who brokers illegal deals involving rare artifacts for a very high-level clientele.

As of 2026, the character has appeared in two projects: the films Guardians of the Galaxy (2014) and Guardians of the Galaxy Vol. 3.

=== Bulldozer ===
Bulldozer (portrayed by Tennison Barry III) is a member of the Wrecking Crew who wears an enchanted Asgardian helmet.

In an alternate universe, Bulldozer (voiced by Ettore Ewen) is a member of the 110th Street gang.

As of 2026, the character has appeared in one project: the Disney+ series She-Hulk: Attorney at Law. An alternate universe variant of Bulldozer appeared in one project: the Disney+ animated series Your Friendly Neighborhood Spider-Man.

=== Sonny Burch ===
Sonny Burch (portrayed by Walton Goggins) is a low-level criminal-type who wants Hank Pym's quantum technology to sell on the black market. He has henchmen (consisting of Uzman, Anitolov, Knox, and FBI agent Stoltz) and is the owner of a restaurant (presumably as a front). Burch attempts to buy Pym's Ant-Man technology, but gets turned down by Hope van Dyne. Burch's men subsequently battle Van Dyne and Scott Lang. He later manages to get information out of Lang's friends Luis, Kurt, and Dave via his "truth serum" concoction.

As of 2026, the character has appeared in one project: the film Ant-Man and the Wasp (2018). An alternate universe variant of Burch appeared in one project: the Disney+ animated series What If...?.

=== Butane ===
Butane (voiced by Jake Green) is an arsonist in an alternate universe who uses high-tech, flame-throwing gauntlets that he acquired from Otto Octavius. Butane is hired by an unidentified party to destroy a building as part of an insurance scam, but while carrying out the act, he is confronted by Spider-Man, who points out that he is burning the wrong building by mistake. Furious at this realization, Butane attacks Spider-Man, who manages to subdue him after a fight.

As of 2026, the character has appeared in one project: the Disney+ animated series Your Friendly Neighborhood Spider-Man.

=== Byrdie the Duck ===
Byrdie the Duck (voiced by Natasha Lyonne) is the daughter of Howard the Duck and Darcy Lewis in an alternate universe where the two are married.

In an alternate universe, Byrdie is a member of the Nova Corps, while in another, she is an anthropomorphic cartoon duck resembling her father Howard.

As of 2026, the character has appeared in one project: the Disney+ animated series What If...?.

== C ==
=== Danielle Cage ===
Danielle Cage (portrayed by twins Annabelle and Isabella Ivlev) is the daughter of Luke Cage and Jessica Jones. She was playing in the living room when her home was attacked by armed men sent by Mr. Charles. After her mother confronted them, Danielle picked up a smoke grenade that had been thrown inside, and before it could be detonated, her mother returned and defused it, telling her it was not a toy. After Charles leaves New York City, Jessica and Danielle are reunited with Luke at Alias Investigations.

As of 2026, the character has appeared in one project: the Disney+ series Daredevil: Born Again.

=== Lilia Calderu ===
Lilia Calderu (portrayed by Patti LuPone as an elderly woman and Chloe Camp as a young woman) is a 450-year-old Sicilian witch and member of Agatha Harkness' coven. In the fourth trial, after Harkness, Jennifer Kale, and Billy Maximoff escape, Lilia decides to stay behind as the Salem's Seven close in. She flips one of the cards, causing the entire room to turn upside down, impaling the Seven and presumably herself.

As of 2026, the character has appeared in one project: the Disney+ series Agatha All Along.

=== Carina ===
Carina (portrayed by Ophelia Lovibond) is the Collector's slave. She attempts to grab the Power Stone, triggering an explosion that destroys much of the Collector's collection and kills her.

As of 2026, the character has appeared in two projects: the films Thor: The Dark World (mid-credits cameo) and Guardians of the Galaxy. Alternate universe variants of Carina appeared in one project: the Disney+ animated series What If...? (voiced by Lovibond in the first season and Kari Wahlgren in the third season).

=== Vanessa Carlysle ===
Vanessa Carlysle (portrayed by Morena Baccarin) is the ex-fiancée of Wade Wilson. She used to be a prostitute and an exotic dancer from New York City on Earth-10005.

As of 2026, the character has appeared in one project: the film Deadpool & Wolverine. Baccarin reprises her role from 20th Century Fox's X-Men film series.

=== Bruno Carrelli ===
Bruno Carrelli (portrayed by Matt Lintz) is the best friend of Kamala Khan, whom he is in love with, and is a former student at Coles Academic High School. He was among the first to know about Khan's powers and helped her understand and master them. Granted early admission to Caltech, Carrelli decided to leave Jersey City for California but not before helping Khan deal with the Clandestines and aiding Kamran from being captured by Damage Control. He left a letter in her locker, in which he revealed his feelings for her, although it is unknown if she ever read it and what he specifically stated. He is also indirectly mentioned in the 2023 film The Marvels.

As of 2026, the character has appeared in one project: the Disney+ series Ms. Marvel.

=== Jo Carrington / Jocasta ===
Dr. Josephine "Jo" Carrington (portrayed by T'Nia Miller) is a neuroscientist who co-led a five-person team responsible for developing the first stable synthetic consciousness at the company Markridge Biotech. Before dying from natural causes in 2008, Carrington transferred her mind into the body of the synthezoid Jocasta (also portrayed by Miller); in this form, she is cunning, powerful, and driven by revenge, targeting the other four members of her former team under the guise of the serial killer known as the "Butcherbird Killer".

As of 2026, the character has appeared in one project: the Disney+ series VisionQuest.

=== Mitchell Carson ===
Mitchell Carson (portrayed by Martin Donovan) is the former head of defense at S.H.I.E.L.D. while secretly working for Hydra. When Hank Pym discovers S.H.I.E.L.D. has been trying to replicate his Pym particles in 1989, he confronts Carson, Peggy Carter, and Howard Stark. In 2015, Carson allies himself with Pym's former protege-turned-adversary, Darren Cross, who has managed to successfully replicate the Pym particles. During a confrontation among these parties, Carson absconds with the particles.

As of 2026, the character has appeared in one project: the film Ant-Man (2015).

=== Casey ===
Casey (portrayed by Eugene Cordero), formerly Hunter K-5E, is a member of the Time Variance Authority. He works for the bureaucratic organization collecting and filing evidence. In the episode "Science/Fiction," it is revealed that Casey is actually a temporal variant of bank robber and Alcatraz escapee Frank Morris.

As of 2026, the character has appeared in three projects: the Disney+ series Loki (2021–2023); the comic book series TVA (2024–2025); and the film Avengers Endgame: Encore (2026).

=== Buck Cashman ===
Buck Cashman (portrayed by Arty Froushan) is the right-hand man and fixer of New York City Mayor Wilson Fisk. Years prior, Cashman had once been hired by Fisk's then-right-hand man, the now-deceased James Wesley, to assassinate Lionel "Ray" McCoy, but failed. During the final day of Fisk's tenure as the mayor, Cashman is shot by Bullseye when protecting Fisk from harm after the trial of Karen Page.

As of 2026, the character has appeared in one project: the Disney+ series Daredevil: Born Again.

=== Frank Castle / Punisher ===
==== Castle family ====
Maria Castle (portrayed by Kelli Barrett) is Frank Castle's wife and they are the parents of two children, Lisa Barbara (initially portrayed by Nicolette Pierini and later replaced by Addie Bernthal) and Frank Jr. (initially portrayed by Aidan Pierce Brennan and later replaced by Eduardo Campirano). After his family is murdered by criminals, Frank becomes the vigilante Punisher to avenge their deaths.

As of 2026, the characters have appeared in two projects: the Marvel Television series The Punisher (2017–2019); and the Disney+ special The Punisher: One Last Kill (2026).

=== Mr. Charles ===
"Mr. Charles" (portrayed by Matthew Lillard) is an influential political figure who works for the director of the Central Intelligence Agency (CIA), Contessa Valentina Allegra de Fontaine, and is recruiting people with superpowers, such as Luke Cage. Mr. Charles also becomes an antagonist to Wilson Fisk during his tenure as mayor of New York City. As tensions rise in the city under Fisk's command, Mr. Charles sends his men to attack Cage's wife, Jessica Jones, at their home because she refused Charles' offer to work for the CIA, though she easily subdues Charles' men. After Fisk's removal from the position of mayor, Charles dismisses Cage and hires Benjamin "Dex" Poindexter as his replacement, during which time Charles begins using the new pseudonym "Mr. Robertson".

As of 2026, the character has appeared in one project: the Disney+ series Daredevil: Born Again.

=== America Chavez ===
America Chavez (portrayed by Xochitl Gomez) is a teenager from the Utopian Parallel who has the ability to travel between dimensions in the multiverse by punching open star-shaped doorways. After traveling across the multiverse along with Stephen Strange and helping to remove the Darkhold influence over Wanda Maximoff, she chooses to stay on Earth-616 and learn the mystic arts at Kamar-Taj under Wong's tutelage.

As of 2026, the character has appeared in one project: the film Doctor Strange in the Multiverse of Madness.

=== Katy Chen ===
Katy Chen (Chinese: 陈瑞文; pinyin: Chen Ruiwen; portrayed by Awkwafina) is a hotel valet and Shang-Chi's best friend who was unaware of his past. She accompanies Shang-Chi to find his sister Xialing, until they are captured by Wenwu and the Ten Rings organization. Escaping with Trevor Slattery, they're going to the mythical village Ta Lo, where she helps defend the village from the Dweller-in-Darkness by striking a weak spot in its armor with an arrow. Back in San Francisco, Katy and Shang-Chi are summoned by the sorcerer Wong to accompany him to Kamar-Taj, where they are introduced to Bruce Banner and Carol Danvers via hologram. Wong, Banner, and Danvers discover that the rings are emitting a mysterious signal and Wong vows to keep looking into it. Shang-Chi then suggests they go to a bar, and he, Katy, and Wong sing karaoke together.

As of 2026, the character has appeared in one project: the film Shang-Chi and the Legend of the Ten Rings. An alternate universe variant of Katy appeared in one project: the Disney+ animated series Marvel Zombies.

==== Chen family ====
Katy Chen's family plays an important role in her life. Mrs. Chen (portrayed by Jodi Long) is Katy's mother; Ruihua (portrayed by Dallas Liu) is Katy's brother; and Katy's unnamed grandmother is portrayed by Tsai Chin.

As of 2026, the characters have appeared in one project: the film Shang-Chi and the Legend of the Ten Rings.

=== Amadeus Cho ===
Amadeus Cho (voiced by Aleks Le) is an Oscorp intern in an alternate universe. He is later promoted to engineer.

As of 2026, the character has appeared in one project: the Disney+ animated series Your Friendly Neighborhood Spider-Man.

=== Helen Cho ===
Dr. Helen Cho (portrayed by Claudia Kim) is a world-renowned Korean geneticist and the leader of the U-GIN Research Group. She is called upon to assist the Avengers with her research and technology in the war against Hydra, treating Clint Barton's injuries. Later, she is approached and brainwashed by Ultron to create a new body for him using vibranium and synthetic tissue, this body becoming Vision.

As of 2026, the character has appeared in one project: the film Avengers: Age of Ultron.

=== Stuart Clarke / Rampage ===
Stuart Clarke (portrayed by Eric André), also known as Rampage, is a member of a Chicago street crew led by Parker Robbins who is later ousted and replaced by Riri Williams after a technological error during a recent heist by Hood's street gang. He was later killed by John offscreen when he was mentioned by Riri to the police that he was found dead in his apartment.

As of 2026, the character has appeared in one project: the Disney+ series Ironheart.

=== Clea ===
Clea (portrayed by Charlize Theron) is a sorceress from the Dark Dimension. In 2024, she comes to Earth to enlist Stephen Strange's help.

As of 2026, the character has appeared in one project: the film Doctor Strange in the Multiverse of Madness (mid-credits cameo).

=== P. Cleary ===
P. Cleary (portrayed by Arian Moayed) is an agent for the Department of Damage Control (DODC). Cleary helmed interrogations against Peter Parker and his friends and family when Mysterio outed his secret identity as Spider-Man. When Cleary had already forgotten Parker's existence under Stephen Strange's spell, he also expressed interest in investigating an incident at AvengerCon in New Jersey involving Kamala Khan, sending Agent Sadie Deever. Due to the incident and a confrontation with Khan, Cleary removes Deever from the mission and relieves her from her position. Cleary hires Trevor Slattery to spy on actor Simon Williams, who is suspected of having superpowers, and that Hollywood has a Doorman Clause, according to which individuals with superpowers are not allowed to participate in any major roles in movies or television shows. After this, he imprisons Slattery for failing in his mission until he discovers that he was freed by Williams, but Cleary reveals that ionic energy was detected at the blast site and suggests that Williams could be a valuable resource.

As of 2026, the character has appeared in three projects: the film Spider-Man: No Way Home; and the Disney+ series Ms. Marvel and Wonder Man (2026–present).

=== Clown ===
Clown (portrayed by Sonia Denis) is a pyrotechnics specialist and member of the Chicago street gang led by Parker Robbins. After discovering information about Rampage's death, she and her partners were fired for speaking out against Robbins.

As of 2026, the character has appeared in one project: the Disney+ series Ironheart.

=== Curt Connors / Lizard ===
As of 2026, alternate universe variants of Dr. Curt Connors, an Oscorp scientist who transformed into a large reptilian monster known as the Lizard while trying to regrow his missing arm, have appeared in two projects: the film Spider-Man: No Way Home (voiced by Rhys Ifans); and the Disney+ animated series Your Friendly Neighborhood Spider-Man, the latter of which introduced the original version of Carla Connors (voiced by Zehra Fazal). Ifans reprises his role from Marc Webb's The Amazing Spider-Man film series (2012–2014).

=== Bastian Cooper / Muse ===
Bastian Cooper (portrayed by Hunter Doohan), also known as Muse, is a masked serial killer in New York City who makes art with the blood of his victims. Cooper attended a book signing for Heather Glenn's book, Live Without Fear: A Guide to Confronting Trauma, at the Inkwell Gathering Space, telling Glenn that he was a fan of her work. Upon capturing Angela del Toro and starting to drain her of blood, he is confronted by Daredevil, defeated, and escapes. He attends Glenn's session, where he reveals his true identity as Muse. In a battle again with Daredevil and before the arrival of the Anti-Vigilante Task Force (AVTF), Muse is killed by Glenn, who later comes to see him as a hallucination.

As of 2026, the character has appeared in one project: the Disney+ series Daredevil: Born Again.

=== Cosmo the Spacedog ===
Cosmo the Spacedog (physically portrayed by dog actors Fred and Slate, with voice and additional motion capture provided by Maria Bakalova) is a member of the Guardians of the Galaxy who is a sapient dog that developed psionic abilities after being sent into space by the Soviet Union. In 1966, she was sent into space and sometime later was found by the Collector who brought her to Knowhere. In 2014, she witnesses the team arrive and survives the explosion of the Power Stone. In 2025, she meets the team again and becomes a member, befriending Rocket Raccoon and helps them rebuild Knowhere following the attack in 2018. She then takes part in their Christmas celebration. In 2026, following an attack by Adam Warlock, she and Kraglin Obfonteri are tasked by Peter Quill with watching over Knowhere while he and the others leave to save an injured Rocket. Later, she uses her powers to prevent the High Evolutionary's ship from crashing into Knowhere and creates a telekinetic tunnel allowing the team to rescue the captured animals. After the others leave the team, she stays with Rocket and Groot in the new team lineup and assists them on Krylor.

As of 2026, the character has appeared in three projects: the films Guardians of the Galaxy and Guardians of the Galaxy Vol. 3; and the Disney+ special The Guardians of the Galaxy Holiday Special (2022). An alternate universe variant of Cosmo appeared in one project: the Disney+ animated series What If...?.

=== Victor Creed / Sabretooth ===
Victor Creed (portrayed by Tyler Mane), also known as Sabretooth, is a mutant in the Void with animalistic physical characteristics that include extendable claws and fangs.

As of 2026, the character has appeared in one project: the film Deadpool & Wolverine. Mane reprises his role from 20th Century Fox's X-Men film series.

=== Darren Cross / Yellowjacket / M.O.D.O.K. ===
Dr. Darren Cross (portrayed by Corey Stoll) is Hank Pym's former protégé. In 2015, he attempts to re-create the Pym particle formula and sell at a black market auction, but is foiled by Scott Lang, Pym, and Pym's daughter Hope van Dyne, Darren's own protégé and would-be romantic interest. After donning the Yellowjacket suit, he was unevenly shrunken to subatomic size in the Quantum Realm and became a mutated, cybernetically enhanced individual with an oversized head known as M.O.D.O.K. (an acronym for "Mechanized Organism Designed Only for Killing"). Initially working as a subordinate for Kang the Conqueror, Cross eventually defects against him and reconciles with Lang, Pym and Van Dyne before dying.

As of 2026, the character has appeared in three projects: the films Ant-Man and Ant-Man and the Wasp: Quantumania (2023); and the web series WHIH Newsfront (2015–2016).

== D ==
=== Dar-Benn ===
Supremor Dar-Benn (portrayed by Zawe Ashton) is a revolutionary Kree warrior and an Accuser of the Kree Empire who fought to restore the Kree homeworld Hala after it was plunged into a devastating civil war as a result of Captain Marvel's actions in killing the Supreme Intelligence. After discovering a Quantum Band on MB-418, Dar-Benn tears apart jump points across space to extract natural resources from various planets, including Tarnax IV, Aladna, and Earth, to restore her homeworld. In the process, Dar-Benn ruins diplomatic peace talks between the Kree and the Skrulls on Tarnax IV, and comes into conflict with Carol Danvers, Monica Rambeau, and Kamala Khan, who wields the other half of the Quantum Bands. Before Dar-Benn can siphon energy from Earth's Sun to reignite Pama, the Marvels intervene, but Dar-Benn acquires the other Quantum Band. In a bid to harness the combined power of both Quantum Bands, Dar-Benn spitefully creates a multiversal wormhole, but its cosmic energy proves overwhelmingly destructive and disintegrates her.

As of 2026, the character has appeared in one project: the film The Marvels (2023).

=== Dave ===
Dave (portrayed by Tip "T.I." Harris) is a friend of Scott Lang, Luis, and Kurt Goreshter. In 2015, he works as Lang's getaway driver during heists. He enjoys playing poker and watching football. He later teases Hank Pym about the heist they pulled in his house before he became one of his employees.

As of 2026, the character has appeared in two projects: the films Ant-Man and Ant-Man and the Wasp.

=== Aaron Davis ===
Aaron Davis (portrayed by Donald Glover), also known as the Prowler, is a low-level criminal with a sense of morality. He attempts to buy high-tech firearms from Herman Schultz and Jackson Brice, only to be interrupted by Spider-Man. The hero later confronts Davis, webs his hand to his car, and questions him regarding Adrian Toomes's plans. Davis gives information about a sale with his former acquaintance Mac Gargan, and admits to wanting to keep the weapons off the streets to protect his nephew. Spider-Man leaves Davis trapped.

As of 2026, the character has appeared in one project: the film Spider-Man: Homecoming. Glover reprises his role in the Sony Pictures Animation film Spider-Man: Across the Spider-Verse (2023) (cameo).

=== Brad Davis ===
Brad Davis (portrayed by Remy Hii) is a student at Midtown School of Science and Technology. He acts as a romantic rival to Peter Parker, competing for the affections of MJ (Michelle Jones) during their European school trip.

As of 2026, the character has appeared in one project: the film Spider-Man: Far From Home.

=== DeMarr Davis / Doorman ===
DeMarr Davis (portrayed by Byron Bowers) is a struggling doorman at the Wilcox Club who is exposed to toxic waste from a Roxxon dumpster and transported to a door-filled dimension, after which he develops the ability to phase through solid matter, and for objects to teleport by passing through his body. He uses his newfound power to save Josh Gad and other club patrons during a fire. The press dubs him "Doorman", and Gad hires him as a bodyguard, then casts him in the hit film Cash Grab, turning DeMarr into a celebrity. His fame collapses and he becomes an alcoholic, but Gad proposes Cash Grab 2. During filming, DeMarr is intoxicated; when Gad attempts to phase through him, he becomes trapped in the dimension and cannot escape. The Department of Damage Control (DODC) places DeMarr under lifelong surveillance to recover Gad, while studios push the Doorman Clause, banning superpowered people from film and television and requiring actors to swear they have no powers.

As of 2026, the character has appeared in one project: the Disney+ series Wonder Man.

=== Sharon Davis ===
Sharon Davis (portrayed by Debra Jo Rupp) is a Westview citizen and the wife of Todd Davis. Following the Westview Anomaly, she became Mrs. Hart, the wife of Arthur Hart and neighbor of Wanda Maximoff and Vision. Years later, Agatha Harkness recruited Sharon into her coven as a substitute for the necessary Green Witch, in order to walk the Witches' Road. She succumbed to the poison, dying during the trial on The Witches' Road.

As of 2026, the character has appeared in two projects: the Disney+ series WandaVision and Agatha All Along.

=== Valentina Allegra de Fontaine ===
Contessa Valentina "Val" Allegra de Fontaine (portrayed by Julia Louis-Dreyfus as an adult and Chiara Stella as a child) is an Italian noblewoman who is the director of the Central Intelligence Agency (CIA), and the ex-wife of CIA officer Everett K. Ross. In 2024, she approaches John Walker who has been stripped of his rank and Captain America mantle following his public murder of a Flag Smasher member. She expresses sympathy for his situation and later recruits him to take up a new mantle, U.S. Agent. She also recruits Yelena Belova as a contract killer and sends her on a mission to kill Clint Barton on behalf of her client Eleanor Bishop. In 2025, she assists Ross in investigating an event involving the Wakandans. She later arrests Ross after realizing he had been in contact with the Wakandans; unbeknownst to her, he is rescued by Okoye.

By 2027, de Fontaine has additionally recruited Ava Starr and Antonia Dreykov as contract killers. Her involvement with the O.X.E. Group's "Sentry" superhuman project puts her at risk of impeachment, leading her to attempt to erase evidence of her misconduct. She sends Belova, Walker, Starr and Dreykov to an O.X.E. facility with orders to kill each other, as they too are evidence, but they manage get out of the trap. Her assistant, Mel updates her that the team had escaped the facility and teamed up with Bob Reynolds, the surviving member of the "Sentry" project. De Fontaine later finds Reynolds and attempts to recruit him. Meanwhile, the Thunderbolts are recruited by Bucky Barnes and attempt to rescue Reynolds and stop de Fontaine. After Reynolds as Sentry turns and almost kills de Fontaine, she deactivates him, unintentionally turning him into his darker half, the Void. After the Thunderbolts neutralize the Void, de Fontaine stages a press conference in which she rebrands them as the New Avengers to avoid punishment, as she cannot eliminate them now due to their heroic actions having a positive effect on the public. Belova quietly tells her that the team "own" her now. That same year, de Fontaine takes interest in Mayor Wilson Fisk's rejuvenation of the Red Hook port and his campaign against local vigilantism, convincing New York State Attorney General Steverud to publicly endorse his Safer Streets initiative and allow him to conduct his activities without extended oversight, while also dispatching CIA operative Mr. Charles as an informant to negotiate closer collaboration with Fisk's administration.

As of 2026, the character has appeared in four projects: the Disney+ series The Falcon and the Winter Soldier; and the films Black Widow (2021), Black Panther: Wakanda Forever, and Thunderbolts* (2025).

=== Death Dealer ===
The Death Dealer (portrayed by Andy Le) is a Ten Rings assassin and Shang-Chi's martial arts mentor during his youth. He accompanied Razor Fist and the Ten Rings in acquiring Xialing's pendant where he fought Shang-Chi before Wenwu broke up the fight. During the battle of Ta Lo, Death Dealer is the first person killed by the forces of the Dweller-in-Darkness, prompting the Ten Rings into forming a truce with the Ta Lo villagers.

As of 2026, the character has appeared in one project: the film Shang-Chi and the Legend of the Ten Rings. An alternate universe variant of Death Dealer has appeared in one project: the Disney+ animated series Marvel Zombies.

=== Julius Dell ===
Julius Dell (portrayed by J. B. Smoove) is a teacher at Midtown School of Science and Technology. He chaperoned the school's European class trip alongside Roger Harrington to accommodate the victims of the Blip, until it was cut short by the Elemental attacks staged by Mysterio. When Peter Parker's identity as Spider-Man was revealed by Mysterio, Dell, Harrington, and the students held a display case in Parker's honor and welcomed him to school, with the exception of Andre Wilson. Later, Dell, like the rest of the world, forgot that Parker was Spider-Man due to Stephen Strange's spell.

As of 2026, the character has appeared in two projects: the films Spider-Man: Far From Home and Spider-Man: No Way Home.

=== Angela del Toro / White Tiger ===
Angela del Toro (portrayed by Camila Rodriguez) is the teenage niece of vigilante Hector Ayala / White Tiger. After her uncle's murder, Angela attempts to inform his lawyer, Matt Murdock, about a series of murders committed by the assassin Muse, believing that they were being investigated by Ayala prior to his death, to no avail. Disillusioned by Murdock's disregard for the situation, Angela attempts to track Muse to his hideout by herself, only to be kidnapped by him. Angela is later rescued by Murdock before she can be killed by Muse. When Hector's wife, Soledad, is arrested by the Anti-Vigilante Task Force (AVTF) for trying to break up a fight between an officer and a teenager, Angela visits Murdock's law partner, Kirsten McDuffie, and retrieves Hector's mystical Amulet of Power. Using it, Angela takes on the mantle of White Tiger from her uncle, and helps Daredevil and Karen Page free Soledad, Jack Duquesne, and other AVTF prisoners. Angela later joins the fight with Daredevil and Jessica Jones, brought together by Daredevil's army to face Fisk and the AVTF.

As of 2026, the character has appeared in one project: the Disney+ series Daredevil: Born Again.

=== Paul Denning / Paladin ===
Paul Denning (portrayed by Todd Stashwick), also known as Paladin, is a bounty hunter with a mysterious past who is trained in all forms of martial arts and weaponry. He is the "last in a centuries-long line of hunters" who have held the title of "Paladin". In 2028, he is hired by an unknown client to capture Vision. After the Client became known as Virgil Horton, Paladin joined Vision, Thomas Shepherd, Lisa Molinari, and E.D.I.T.H. to confront Ultron.

As of 2026, the character has appeared in one project: the Disney+ series VisionQuest (2026).

=== Jacques Dernier ===
Jacques Dernier (portrayed by Bruno Ricci) is a French member of the Howling Commandos who fought in World War II.

As of 2026, the character has appeared in one project: the film Captain America: The First Avenger (2011). An alternate universe variant of Dernier appeared in one project: the Disney+ animated series What If...?.

=== Jean DeWolff ===
Jean DeWolff (portrayed by Liza Colón-Zayas) is a New York City Police Department (NYPD) detective and an ally of Spider-Man.

As of 2026, the character has appeared in one project: the film Spider-Man: Brand New Day (2026).

=== Rhomann Dey ===
Rhomann Dey (portrayed by John C. Reilly) is a member of the Nova Corps and contact to Peter Quill and the Guardians of the Galaxy. He is promoted to the rank of Denarian due to his actions during the Battle of Xandar.

As of 2026, the character has appeared in one project: the film Guardians of the Galaxy.

=== Max Dillon / Electro ===
Max Dillon (portrayed by Jamie Foxx), also known as Electro, is an Oscorp electrical engineer from an alternate reality who gained electric powers after an accident involving genetically modified electric eels. Upon reaching the main universe, Dillon is one of the villains to be imprisoned by Dr. Strange, although he rejects the cure Spider-Man (Peter-1) attempts to give him, seizing an arc reactor before battling all three Spider-Men at the Statue of Liberty. He is later cured by Doctor Octopus and reconciles with his universe's Peter Parker before being safely transported to his universe.

As of 2026, the character has appeared in one project: the film Spider-Man: No Way Home. Foxx reprises his role from Marc Webb's The Amazing Spider-Man film series.

=== Dopinder ===
Dopinder (portrayed by Karan Soni), is a man of Indian descent from Earth-10005 who makes a living as a taxi cab driver. One day, he picks up Deadpool who, uncomfortable with sitting in the back seat, moves to the front and starts a conversation with Dopinder about where he is going and why. The two end up forming an unusual friendship as Dopinder seems to bluntly accept Deadpool's violent lifestyle. Dopinder was initially engaged to a woman named Gita who, unfortunately for Dopinder, is in love with his cousin Bandhu who Dopinder describes as being "as dishonorable as he is attractive." At Deadpool's somewhat indirect suggestion, Dopinder kidnaps Bandhu and ties him up in the trunk of his taxi cab. An amused Deadpool supports Dopinder's action while feigning condemnation, as he was riding with Colossus and Negasonic Teenage Warhead at the time, covertly advising Dopinder to kill his competition. Later, distracted by a cellphone call from Deadpool, Dopinder stops his cab suddenly and is rear-ended by another vehicle, crushing the trunk and causing Bandhu to scream in pain.

In the film's sequel, Dopinder continues driving Deadpool to his various contracts and missions while hoping to become a contract killer himself (confirming that he managed to successfully yet indirectly kill Bandhu) as he's envious of Deadpool's lifestyle. He begins working as a janitor at Sister Margaret's School for Wayward Children, but Deadpool and Weasel refuse to have him join in any missions. Dopinder continues showing up to aid Deadpool, but chickens out upon seeing Juggernaut. Dopinder soon returns to use his taxi to kill the mutant-hating Essex Center headmaster, getting his first thrill from actually killing somebody on purpose.

As of 2026, the character has appeared in one project: the film Deadpool & Wolverine. Soni reprises his role from 20th Century Fox's X-Men film series.

=== Dormammu ===
Dormammu (voiced by Benedict Cumberbatch and an unidentified British actor) is a primordial inter-dimensional entity and ruler of the Dark Dimension. He wields apocalyptic levels of supernatural power. Dormammu seeks to absorb all other universes into his Dark Dimension and turn the victims into Mindless Ones. The Zealots misinterpret this eternal existence as a benevolent longevity, and Dormammu gives them some of his power. Stephen Strange uses the Time Stone to trap himself and Dormammu in an endless loop, where he offers a bargain and dies when the entity refuses. Desperate to escape this loop, Dormammu accepts the bargain to end it in exchange for taking his Zealots from the Earth and never returning to it. This version of Dormammu appears as a massive face made of rippling mystical energy, with his full form never seen.

As of 2026, the character has appeared in one project: the film Doctor Strange. Alternate universe variants of Dormammu appeared in one project: the Disney+ animated series What If...?.

=== Dox ===
General Dox (portrayed by Kate Dickie) is a member of the Time Variance Authority. Intent on preserving the Sacred Timeline, she sends her allies to bomb all the branching timelines of the multiverse, which has the effect of killing billions; although Dox is arrested, her plan mostly succeeds.

As of 2026, the character has appeared in one project: the Disney+ series Loki.

=== Dreykov ===
General Dreykov (portrayed by Ray Winstone) is a high-ranking officer in the Soviet Armed Forces who acts as the Red Room's overseer and father and superior to Taskmaster. He is killed by Yelena Belova in 2016.

As of 2026, the character has appeared in one project: the film Black Widow. An alternate universe variant of Dreykov (voiced by Piotr Michael) appeared in one project: the Disney+ animated series What If...?.

=== Antonia Dreykov / Taskmaster ===
Antonia Dreykov (portrayed by Olga Kurylenko), also known as Taskmaster, is an agent of the Red Room, brainwashed by her father, Dreykov. She studies her opponents' fighting style to mimic them and learn how to use it against them, and uses techniques from other superheroes. By 2027, Taskmaster is working for Valentina Allegra de Fontaine as a contract killer, and is sent to kill John Walker. A fight between herself, Walker, Yelena Belova and Ava Starr ensues, with Taskmaster being fatally shot in the head by Starr and her body later incinerated by the room.

As of 2026, the character has appeared in two projects: the films Black Widow and Thunderbolts*.

=== Dro'ge ===
Emperor Dro'ge (portrayed by Gary Lewis) is the leader of a Skrull colony located on Tarnax. In 2026, he has peace talks with the Kree, but they are interrupted by Captain Marvel, which causes Dar-Benn to attack the planet. He and his colony are then taken to Earth.

As of 2026, the character has appeared in one project: the film The Marvels.

=== Druig ===
Druig (portrayed by Barry Keoghan) is an aloof Eternal who can use cosmic energy to control the minds of others. He becomes withdrawn from the other Eternals, frustrated because he disagrees with their interactions with humankind. The only exception is Makkari, with whom he develops a trusting, intimate relationship. Druig retreats to the Amazon rainforest and leads a cult, perceiving that he has removed the burden of choice from these humans. However, he reunites with his fellow Eternals when they are attacked by Deviants after coming to his residence.

As of 2026, the character has appeared in one project: the film Eternals.

=== Dum Dum Dugan ===
Timothy "Dum Dum" Dugan (portrayed by Neal McDonough) is a member and leader of the Howling Commandos who fought alongside Steve Rogers, Bucky Barnes, and Peggy Carter during World War II.

As of 2026, the character has appeared in four projects: the film Captain America: The First Avenger; the Marvel One-Shot Agent Carter (2013); and the Marvel Television series Agents of S.H.I.E.L.D. and Agent Carter (2015–2016). An alternate universe variant of Dugan appeared in one project: the Disney+ animated series What If...?.

=== D.U.M.-E. and U. ===
D.U.M.-E. (portrayed by Henry Lewis) and U. (portrayed by Jonathan Sayer) are a pair of robots created by Tony Stark to assist him in his workshop.

As of 2026, the characters have appeared in six projects: the films Iron Man (2008), Iron Man 2 (2010), Iron Man 3, Spider-Man: Homecoming, and Spider-Man: No Way Home; and the Disney+ series VisionQuest, the latter of which is the first time they are visualized with human actors.

=== Dennis Dunphy ===
Dennis Dunphy (portrayed by William Mark McCullough) is a United States Navy SEALs commander and friend of Sam Wilson. He is killed by Samuel Sterns.

As of 2026, the character has appeared in one project: the film Captain America: Brave New World.

=== Jack Duquesne / Swordsman ===
Jacques "Jack" Duquesne (portrayed by Tony Dalton) is a wealthy socialite who is a highly skilled fencer. Along with his uncle Armand III, he attends a black market auction of items stolen from the Avengers compound in 2024, and steals Ronin's retractable sword. He is framed for his uncle's murder by his fiancée Eleanor Bishop on Wilson Fisk's request. Jack later assists Kate Bishop in fighting the Tracksuit Mafia. By 2027, Jack has become a sword-wielding vigilante in New York City known as the Swordsman, who, after vigilantism was deemed illegal in the city, was imprisoned in Mayor Wilson Fisk's dungeon, though Jack is later freed by Daredevil, who helps him free other prisoners and escape from Fisk's Anti-Vigilante Task Force (AVTF). After that, Jack decides to leave New York, but not before setting up a bank account for Daredevil and his ally Karen Page to use in case of need.

As of 2026, the character has appeared in two projects: the Disney+ series Hawkeye and Daredevil: Born Again.

==== Duquesne family ====
Armand Duquesne III (portrayed by Simon Callow) is the uncle of Jack Duquesne. In 2024, Armand III discovered that Jack's then-fiancée Eleanor Bishop was working for crime boss Wilson Fisk and threatened to expose them, prompting Eleanor to kill Armand III. Armand Duquesne VII (portrayed by Jonathan Bergman) is the grandson of Armand III.

As of 2026, the characters have appeared in one project: the Disney+ series Hawkeye.

== E ==
=== E.D.I.T.H. ===
E.D.I.T.H. (initially voiced by Dawn Michelle King and later portrayed by Emily Hampshire), which stands for Even Dead, I'm the Hero, is an advanced augmented reality artificial intelligence with numerous security, defense and tactical abilities created by Tony Stark and built into his pair of sunglasses. After his death, E.D.I.T.H. was given to Peter Parker, who gained access to Stark Industries' global satellite network, as well as an arsenal of missiles and drones. However, Parker briefly relinquished control of E.D.I.T.H. to Quentin Beck, who used the A.I. to launch an attack on London, eliminating anyone who stood in his way. Following Beck's death, Parker recovered the glasses, along with E.D.I.T.H., but because Parker's identity as Spider-Man had been exposed and he was suspected of Beck's murder, the glasses were photographed as evidence.

By 2028, E.D.I.T.H. and a few other A.I. created by Stark were also downloaded into White Vision's Mindspace. E.D.I.T.H. assumed the human avatar of Edith Marks, whom she had been modeled after, and helped Vision learn about humanity.

As of 2026, the character has appeared in two projects: the film Spider-Man: Far From Home; and the Disney+ series VisionQuest.

=== Ego ===
Ego (portrayed by Kurt Russell) is a Celestial and the father of Peter Quill and Mantis. Ego rescues the Guardians of the Galaxy from the Sovereign's drones, taking the group to his planet (an extension of him) and teaching Peter to harness the celestial energy that he inherited from him. Ego reveals that he planted seedlings on many worlds, which required the power of two celestials to xenoform the worlds in Ego's image. To that end, he impregnated several women and killed all the children when they failed to inherit the celestial energy. Ego reveals that he planted the tumor that killed Peter's mother, and Peter violently attacks him. Ego parasitically draws on his energy to begin the process, but the Guardians blow up his brain at the planet's center, killing him and robbing Star-Lord of his celestial qualities.

As of 2026, the character has appeared in one project: the film Guardians of the Galaxy Vol. 2. Alternate universe variants of Ego appeared in one project: the Disney+ animated series What If...?.

=== Eitri ===
Eitri (portrayed by Peter Dinklage) is the king of the Dwarves, an ancient race of skilled dwarfs. Atypically to his traditional diminutive form in the comic books, the MCU's version of Eitri is depicted at a giant's size (although he still refers to his race as Dwarves). Thor comes to him on Nidavellir asking for a new weapon after Mjolnir was destroyed by Hela. Eitri reveals that Thanos forced the Dwarves to produce the Infinity Gauntlet, before slaughtering the entire race except Eitri, destroying his hands to render him unable to forge anything ever again. Thor, Groot, and Rocket all help Eitri create the new weapon, Stormbreaker.

As of 2026, the character has appeared in one project: the film Avengers: Infinity War. An alternate universe variant of Eitri appeared in one project: the Disney+ animated series What If...?.

=== Harvey Elder / Mole Man ===
Harvey Elder (portrayed by Paul Walter Hauser), also known as Mole Man, is a former enemy-turned-ally of the Fantastic Four and the human ruler of Subterranea, an underground society whose inhabitants refer to themselves as Moloids.

As of 2026, the character has appeared in two projects: the one-shot comic Fantastic Four: First Steps (2025); and the film The Fantastic Four: First Steps (2025).

=== Layla El-Faouly / Scarlet Scarab ===
Layla El-Faouly (portrayed by May Calamawy), also known as Scarlet Scarab, is Marc Spector's wife, an archaeologist and adventurer who becomes the avatar of Tawaret. The character made her comics debut in 2023.

As of 2026, the character has appeared in one project: the Disney+ series Moon Knight.

=== Matthew Ellis ===
Matthew Ellis (portrayed by William Sadler) is the former president of the United States. In 2013, he is kidnapped on board Air Force One by Eric Savin via the Iron Patriot armor. He becomes a hostage of Aldrich Killian's fake terrorist attack before being rescued by Tony Stark and James Rhodes. In 2014, he is one of the targets marked by Alexander Pierce's Helicarriers before being saved by Steve Rogers and Sam Wilson.

As of 2026, the character has appeared in three projects: the film Iron Man 3; the Marvel Television series Agents of S.H.I.E.L.D.; and the web series WHIH Newsfront.

=== Eros / Starfox ===
Eros (portrayed by Harry Styles), also known as Starfox, is an Eternal and the brother of Thanos.

As of 2026, the character has appeared in one project: the film Eternals (mid-credits cameo). An alternate universe variant of Eros (voiced by Will Champion) appeared in one project: the mixed reality experience What If...? – An Immersive Story (2024).

=== Abraham Erskine ===
Dr. Abraham Erskine (portrayed by Stanley Tucci) is the creator of the Super Soldier Serum, being responsible for the origin of Steve Rogers as Captain America and Johann Schmidt as the Red Skull. Before being assassinated by Hydra agent Heinz Kruger, Erskine motivates Rogers to always remain as a good man in his heart.

As of 2026, the character has appeared in one project: the film Captain America: The First Avenger. Alternate universe variants of Erskine appeared in one project: the Disney+ animated series What If...?.

=== Christine Everhart ===
Christine Everhart (portrayed by Leslie Bibb) is a news reporter for Vanity Fair and later a news broadcaster for WHiH World News.

As of 2026, the character has appeared in three projects: the films Iron Man and Iron Man 2; and the web series WHIH Newsfront. Alternate universe variants of Everhart appeared in one project: the Disney+ animated series What If...?.

=== E.V. ===
E.V. (voiced by Naomi Watts) is an artificial intelligence created by Peter Parker that was installed in the fifth iteration of the Spider-Man Suit and designed to work alongside him in his duties as Spider-Man.

As of 2026, the character has appeared in one project: the film Spider-Man: Brand New Day.

== F ==
=== James Montgomery Falsworth ===
James Montgomery Falsworth (portrayed by JJ Feild) is a British member of the Howling Commandos who fought in World War II.

As of 2026, the character has appeared in one project: the film Captain America: The First Avenger. An alternate universe variant of Falsworth appeared in one project: the Disney+ animated series What If...?.

=== Sonya Falsworth ===
Sonya Falsworth (portrayed by Olivia Colman) is a high-ranking MI6 agent and an old ally of Nick Fury's who looks to protect British national security interests during the Skrulls' infiltration of Earth. She forms a partnership with Gi'ah after the latter's defeat of Gravik.

As of 2026, the character has appeared in one project: the Disney+ series Secret Invasion (2023).

=== Fandral the Dashing ===
Fandral (initially portrayed by Joshua Dallas and subsequently by Zachary Levi), also known as Fandral the Dashing, is a member of the Warriors Three, depicted as a dashing warrior from Asgard. He is killed by Hela in 2017.

As of 2026, the character has appeared in three projects: the films Thor, Thor: The Dark World, and Thor: Ragnarok. An alternate universe variant of Fandral (voiced by Max Mittelman) appeared in one project: the Disney+ animated series What If...?.

=== Fen ===
Princess Fen (portrayed by María Mercedes Coroy) is Namor's mother who gave birth to him in 1571 and later died in the 17th century.

As of 2026, the character has appeared in one project: the film Black Panther: Wakanda Forever.

=== John Flynn ===
John Flynn (portrayed by Bradley Whitford) is a senior agent of the Strategic Scientific Reserve under whom Peggy Carter is stationed after the end of World War II, though he never assigns her to field work despite her background and is, at times, disrespectful and misogynist towards her. On Howard Stark's orders, he informs Peggy that she will run then newly formed organization, S.H.I.E.L.D., with Howard.

As of 2026, the character has appeared in one project: the Marvel One-Shot Agent Carter. An alternate universe variant of Flynn appeared in one project: the Disney+ animated series What If...?.

=== Bill Foster ===
Dr. William "Bill" Foster (portrayed by Laurence Fishburne) is a physicist and the former Giant-Man. He was Hank Pym's assistant on "Project Goliath" and is Ava Starr's surrogate father after Elihas' death. In 2018, Foster teaches quantum physics at UC Berkeley when he encounters his former employer, Scott Lang, and Hope van Dyne. When Ava restrains Pym, Lang and Hope, Foster states that he has been working to cure Ava by obtaining quantum energy from the Quantum Realm. As Pym knows that Foster's plan will affect Janet van Dyne's rescue, Hope, Lang and Pym manage their escape. When Hank goes into the Quantum Realm, Pym talks Foster down and states that he will find a way to help cure Ava as Pym's ants escort Foster out. After Janet is rescued from the realm and gives some of her energy to stabilize Ava, Foster takes Ava away as Pym still vows to find a way to help Ava to keep herself stable for good.

As of 2026, the character has appeared in one project: the film Ant-Man and the Wasp. Alternate universe variants of Foster as Goliath appeared in one project: the Disney+ animated series What If...?.

=== Jeanne Foucault / Finesse ===
Jeanne Foucault (voiced by Anjali Kunapaneni), also known as Finesse, is a vigilante and ally of Daredevil in an alternate universe. She infiltrates Oscorp as an intern to spy on Norman Osborn.

As of 2026, the character has appeared in one project: the Disney+ animated series Your Friendly Neighborhood Spider-Man.

=== F.R.I.D.A.Y. ===
F.R.I.D.A.Y. (initially voiced by Kerry Condon and later portrayed by Orla Brady) is an artificial intelligence created by Tony Stark to replace J.A.R.V.I.S. as his personal assistant. She served as Stark's main user interface computer system during the final battle between the Avengers and Ultron in Sokovia and to find information about Helmut Zemo. By 2028, F.R.I.D.A.Y. and a few other Stark A.I.s were uploaded by White Vision into his Mindspace. F.R.I.D.A.Y. assumed the human avatar of Allison Hogan, whom she had been modeled after, and aided Vision in his quest to understand humanity. However, F.R.I.D.A.Y. has seemingly been deleted by Ultron, but she actually survived, and upon discovering Ultron’s mercy. She is ultimately free to leave and see the world.

As of 2026, the character has appeared in six projects: the films Avengers: Age of Ultron, Captain America: Civil War, Spider-Man: Homecoming, Avengers: Infinity War, and Avengers: Endgame; and the Disney+ series VisionQuest. An alternate universe variant of F.R.I.D.A.Y. appeared in one project: the Disney+ animated series Marvel Zombies.

=== Frigga ===
Frigga (portrayed by Rene Russo as an older woman and Chanique Greyling as a young woman) is Thor's biological mother and Loki's adopted mother, who is killed by Algrim in 2013. In 2023, Thor time travels to 2013, where Frigga comforts his depression during his mission to retrieve the Reality Stone. She also knows that her time is near, and prevents Thor from telling her how she dies by encouraging him to change his future.

As of 2026, the character has appeared in four projects: the films Thor, Thor: The Dark World, Avengers: Endgame, and Thor: Love and Thunder (2022) (cameo of young Frigga portrayed by Greyling). An alternate universe variant of Frigga (voiced by Josette Eales) appeared in one project: the Disney+ animated series What If...?.

== G ==
=== Galactus ===
Galactus (portrayed by Ralph Ineson) is a gigantic cosmic being who consumes the life force of planets who hails from the Earth-828 timeline. Galactus was once a mortal man, before becoming the planet devouring creature he is in the present-day. This timeline's Earth is targeted by Galactus, who sends his herald Silver Surfer to warn of the planet's last days. Earth's heroes the Fantastic Four attempt to negotiate with Galactus; Galactus requests Reed Richards's and Sue Storm's unborn son Franklin, which the four refuse to give up, prompting Galactus to continue with his invasion. The four come up with a plan to send Galactus through a black hole using the now born Franklin as bait. However, after a failed attempt, the Silver Surfer sacrifices herself into the black hole, taking Galactus with her.

As of 2026, the character has appeared in two projects: the film The Fantastic Four: First Steps; and the one-shot comic Fantastic Four: First Foes – Shalla-Bal (2026). Ineson previously portrayed a Ravager pilot in the film Guardians of the Galaxy.

=== John Gallo ===
John Gallo (voiced by Roger Craig Smith) is an Oscorp security guard in an alternate universe. Upon signing the Sokovia Accords, Oscorp CEO Norman Osborn presents Thaddeus Ross with forged documents identifying Gallo as the true identity of Spider-Man.

As of 2026, the character has appeared in one project: the Disney+ animated series Your Friendly Neighborhood Spider-Man.

=== Phil Gallo ===
Phillip "Phil" Gallo (portrayed by Michael Gaston) is the Police Commissioner of New York City. He is a key opponent of Mayor Wilson Fisk and the Anti-Vigilante Task Force (AVTF). After offering to give BB Urich information on the AVTF and threatening to report Fisk to the governor, he is kidnapped and killed by Fisk.

As of 2026, the character has appeared in one project: the Disney+ series Daredevil: Born Again. Gaston previously portrayed Gerald Sharpe in the Marvel Television series Agents of S.H.I.E.L.D.

=== Mac Gargan / Scorpion ===
MacDonald "Mac" Gargan (portrayed by Michael Mando) is a professional criminal and one of Adrian Toomes's potential buyers. In 2017, following an encounter with Spider-Man on the Staten Island ferry, Gargan is arrested by the FBI and vows revenge, seeking out new allies to help him kill Spider-Man. While recovering from his injuries, he approaches Toomes in prison on the basis of certain rumours, wanting to know Spider-Man's identity to settle personal scores. Toomes denies that he knows it, however. By 2028, Gargan had escaped from prison and began wearing a suit of armor equipped with a mechanized scorpion-like tail, becoming a supervillain known as Scorpion. He was recaptured by Spider-Man sometime later before then being freed from Damage Control custody and possessed by Jean Grey. Under her influence, Gargan attacks another DODC location in search of "V-Max" before being confronted and severely beaten by Spider-Man. Following this, Grey leaves Gargan's mind as he is taken in by the NYPD.

In an alternate universe, Gargan (voiced by Jonathan Medina) is the leader of the Scorpions gang who, after acquiring from the renegade scientist Otto Octavius a suit of armor equipped with a mechanized scorpion-like tail, becomes the supervillain Scorpion.

As of 2026, the character has appeared in two projects: the films Spider-Man: Homecoming and Spider-Man: Brand New Day. An alternate universe variant of Gargan appeared in one project: the Disney+ animated series Your Friendly Neighborhood Spider-Man.

=== G'iah ===
G'iah (portrayed by Auden L. Ophuls and Harriet L. Ophuls as a child, and Emilia Clarke as an adult) is Talos and Soren's daughter.

As a child, she believed Nick Fury would be able to find her people a new home. As an adult however, she grew to resent him for not fulfilling his promise and joined Gravik's rebel army in the hopes he would be able to accelerate the process. In time, she would doubt Gravik as well and secretly leak information on his plans to Talos. Anticipating Gravik would discover her subterfuge and attempt to kill her, she uses his DNA machine to turn herself into a Super-Skrull and use her newly acquired abilities to fake her death. She would later empower herself with the Harvest, a collection of DNA samples from the superpowered individuals who fought in the Battle of Earth, to fight and eventually kill Gravik before freeing the rebels' human prisoners and working with Sonya Falsworth to rescue more humans and protect the Skrulls.

As of 2026, the character has appeared in two projects: the film Captain Marvel (2019); and the Disney+ series Secret Invasion.

=== Ted Gilbert ===
Ted Gilbert (portrayed by Mark Gatiss) is the host of a popular talk show on Earth-828 called The Ted Gilbert Show.

As of 2026, the character has appeared in two projects: the film The Fantastic Four: First Steps; and the one-shot comic Fantastic Four: First Foes (2026).

=== Gilgamesh ===
Gilgamesh (portrayed by Don Lee) is the strongest Eternal, able to project an exoskeleton of cosmic energy. He has a deep connection with Thena, and stays as her guardian over the centuries after the Eternals split ways in 1521. At Druig's residence, Gilgamesh is killed by the rapidly evolving Deviant Kro, who absorbs his powers and memories.

Lee took the role to inspire younger generations as the first mainstream Korean superhero. Lee was able to utilize his training in boxing in the character's fight choreography.

As of 2026, the character has appeared in one project: the film Eternals.

=== Corvus Glaive ===
Corvus Glaive (voiced and portrayed via motion capture in live-action by Michael James Shaw) is one of Thanos's adopted sons. In 2018, he, along with Proxima Midnight, Ebony Maw, and Cull Obsidian, joined his father in his quest for the six Infinity Stones, initially attacking the Statesman carrying Thor and the refugee Asgardians to retrieve the Space Stone. Glaive and Midnight are sent to retrieve the Mind Stone and ambush Vision and Wanda Maximoff in Scotland. Glaive wounds Vision, but is defeated by Steve Rogers, Natasha Romanoff, and Sam Wilson. Later, Glaive goes to Wakanda where he infiltrates the medical center and attacks Shuri, stopping her from working on getting the Stone out of Vision, which leads Vision to come to her defense and tackle Glaive out of center. In the forest below, Rogers intervenes in the fight, but Glaive incapacitates the former before Vision kills the latter. Glaive's weapon was later recovered by the Wakandans who turned it into a power source which is later used by Vision.

An alternate variant of Glaive travels through the Quantum Realm with Thanos's army to fight Earth-616 Avengers in their universe, only to be killed by Okoye.

As of 2026, the character has appeared in one project: the film Avengers: Infinity War. Alternate universe variants of Glaive appeared in two projects: the film Avengers: Endgame; and the Disney+ animated series What If...? (voiced by Fred Tatasciore).

=== Heather Glenn / Muse ===
Heather Glenn (portrayed by Margarita Levieva) is a therapist who briefly dated Matt Murdock before they both decided to end their relationship. When one of her patients, Bastian Cooper, reveals himself to be the serial killer Muse, he attempts to kill her, but Murdock, in his vigilante persona of Daredevil, appears and engages in a fight with Muse that ends with Glenn taking Muse's life. This incident leads Glenn to develop a negative view of vigilantes, believing them to be evil, and also to be appointed the Mental Health Commissioner by the mayor of New York City, Wilson Fisk. Furthermore, Muse's attempted murder of Glenn causes her to develop post-traumatic stress disorder, leading her to have hallucinations about him, eventually embracing them and becoming the second Muse.

As of 2026, the character has appeared in one project: the Disney+ series Daredevil: Born Again.

=== Ma Gnucci ===
Isabella Carmela Magdalena "Ma" Gnucci (portrayed by Judith Light) is a crime lord and the matriarch of the Gnucci Crime Family. In 2027, she places a bounty on the Punisher's head as revenge for the murder of her husband and three sons.

As of 2026, the character has appeared in one project: the Disney+ special The Punisher: One Last Kill.

==== Gnucci family ====
Besides Ma Gnucci, the Gnucci Crime Family includes her husband, Benny (portrayed by Dominick Mancino), and their three sons: Bobby (portrayed by Joseph Devito), the eldest, who is a New York Police Department (NYPD) officer; Eddie, the middle son, who is the father of a boy named Eddie Jr. (portrayed by Henry Corvino); and Carlo (portrayed by David Manuele), the youngest, who is allegedly a pedophile. Benny and his sons are killed by the Punisher due to their involvement in the deaths of his family.

As of 2026, the characters have appeared in one project: the Disney+ special The Punisher: One Last Kill.

=== Gorr the God Butcher ===
Gorr (portrayed by Christian Bale) is the scarred final prophet of his civilization's god, Rapu; following the deaths of his people and daughter Love, and dismissal by Rapu, Gorr is corrupted by the "strange and terrifying" Necrosword and transformed into the newest God Butcher, a galactic killer who seeks the extinction of the gods. After making his way to Eternity to wish the extinction of the gods, Gorr is freed from the Necrosword's influence by Thor and Jane Foster, and he instead wishes for his daughter Love's resurrection, which gives her omnipotent powers due to being resurrected by Eternity, sharing one final moment with her before dying.

As of 2026, the character has appeared in one project: the film Thor: Love and Thunder.

=== Grandmaster ===
The Grandmaster (portrayed by Jeff Goldblum) is the ruler of Sakaar, where he hosts a series of games called the Contest of Champions. He is eventually overthrown by his subjects. He is the brother of the Collector.

As of 2026, the character has appeared in three projects: the films Guardians of the Galaxy Vol. 2 (end credits sequence) and Thor: Ragnarok; and the short film Team Darryl (2018). Alternate universe variants of the Grandmaster appeared in one project: the Disney+ animated series What If...? (voiced by Goldblum in the first and second seasons, and Matt Friend in the third season).

=== Gravik ===
Gravik (portrayed by Kingsley Ben-Adir as an adult and Lucas Persaud as a child) is the leader of a group of rebel Skrulls who broke away from Talos's faction, believing the best way to help their kind is to infiltrate Earth for the resources they need. In pursuit of his mission, he and a group of scientific collaborators established the "Super-Skrull" project to collect powered DNA and strengthen their forces, with Gravik as the first test subject. He later obtains DNA samples from all of the superheroes who fought during the Battle of Earth, among others, but is eventually killed by a similarly empowered G'iah.

As of 2026, the character has appeared in one project: the Disney+ series Secret Invasion.

=== Phil Grayfield ===
Phillip "Phil" Grayfield (voiced by Roger Craig Smith) is the coach of the Rockford T. Bales High School football team in an alternate universe.

As of 2026, the character has appeared in one project: the Disney+ animated series Your Friendly Neighborhood Spider-Man.

=== Jean Grey ===
Jean Elaine Grey (portrayed by Sadie Sink) is a mutant with psionic abilities capable of telekinesis and telepathy, who opposes the Department of Damage Control, seeking to learn what happened to her older sister Sara. She ends up possessing multiple people’s bodies, including Hulk and Scorpion, in her efforts, causing collateral damage and bringing her into conflict with Spider-Man, who is immune to her abilities and is determined to stop her rampage, prompting her to psychically torment him to get him out of her way. Upon discovering Sara's death, Jean unlocks even stronger telekinetic abilities in a fit of destructive rage and nearly kills Bill Metzger in revenge. However, Spider-Man's advice and comfort and a conversation with his aunt May inside his mind convince her otherwise, and she telekinetically helps Spider-Man recover from a gunshot wound he inadvertently sustained from the Punisher while protecting her from his assassination attempt, before leaving New York City.

As of 2026, the character has appeared in one project: the film Spider-Man: Brand New Day. She will return in the upcoming films Avengers: Secret Wars and X-Men (2028).

=== Sara Grey ===
Sara Grey (portrayed by Olivia Booth-Ford) is Jean Grey's older, also-mutant sister who possesses the same powers as her. While training Jean to use her telepathy at a park, Sara is arrested by the Department of Damage Control (DODC), and she communicates telepathically with Jean as DODC head Bill Metzger subjects her to experiments attempting to replicate her powers, eventually killing her during one of the procedures.

As of 2026, the character has appeared in one project: the film Spider-Man: Brand New Day.

=== Grills ===
Grills (portrayed by Clayton English) is a firefighter with the Fire Department of the City of New York (FDNY) and a practitioner of live action role-playing games (LARP). He is recruited by Kate Bishop to assist her and Clint Barton in their fight against the Tracksuit Mafia.

As of 2026, the character has appeared in one project: the Disney+ series Hawkeye.

=== Ben Grimm / The Thing ===
Benjamin "Ben" Grimm (portrayed by Ebon Moss-Bachrach), also known as The Thing, is a member of the Fantastic Four and a former astronaut whose skin has been transformed into a layer of orange rock, granting him superhuman strength and durability.

As of 2026, the character has appeared in three projects: the one-shot comics Fantastic Four: First Steps and Fantastic Four: First Foes (2026); and the film The Fantastic Four: First Steps. He will return in the films Avengers: Doomsday and Avengers: Secret Wars. Moss-Bachrach previously portrayed David Lieberman / Micro in the Marvel Television series The Punisher.

== H ==
=== Justin Hammer ===
Justin Hammer (portrayed by Sam Rockwell) is a weapons manufacturer and rival of Tony Stark. After noticing Ivan Vanko's use of an arc reactor-based weapon, he breaks Vanko out of jail and uses him for making weapons, including turning James Rhodes's armor into War Machine.

As of 2026, the character has appeared in two projects: the film Iron Man 2; and the Marvel One-Shot All Hail the King (2014). An alternate universe variant of Hammer appeared in one project: the Disney+ animated series What If...?.

=== Maya Hansen ===
Maya Hansen (portrayed by Rebecca Hall) is a scientist and a developer of the Extremis virus. She then works for Aldrich Killian who uses the virus as a weapon. She is later killed by him after she turns on him and has a change of heart.

As of 2026, the character has appeared in one project: the film Iron Man 3.

=== Evanora Harkness ===
Evanora Harkness (portrayed by Kate Forbes) is the witch leader of the Salemites and the mother of Agatha Harkness. In 1693, she holds a trial for her daughter in Salem, Massachusetts for practicing dark magic. Her powers are absorbed by Agatha, who kills her and the rest of her coven. In 2026, during the third trial on the Witches' Road, Evanora's ghost is summoned by Agatha's coven. Evanora possesses her daughter, but is banished by Alice Wu-Gulliver's magic.

As of 2026, the character has appeared in two projects: the Disney+ series WandaVision and Agatha All Along.

=== Roger Harrington ===
Roger Harrington (portrayed by Martin Starr) is a science teacher at Midtown School of Science and Technology. In 2010, as a student at Culver University, he grants Bruce Banner access to the computers in exchange for some pizza. After graduating, he moves to New York City and goes on to become a teacher and the coach of the Midtown School of Science and Technology Academic Decathlon Team. In 2024, he goes as a chaperone on a school-sponsored trip to Europe, but it gets ruined by Quentin Beck / Mysterio. Among his former students are Peter Parker, Flash Thompson, Michelle Jones, Ned Leeds, and Betty Brant. After Peter Parker was revealed to be Spider-Man by Mysterio, Harrington, Julius Dell, and several students made a display case in his honor as a hero, despite Andre Wilson trying to prevent it, but a few days later, Harrington and everyone else forgot that Parker was Spider-Man because of Stephen Strange's spell.

As of 2026, the character has appeared in four projects: the films The Incredible Hulk, Spider-Man: Homecoming, Spider-Man: Far From Home, and Spider-Man: No Way Home. His picture appears in a cameo in Spider-Man: Brand New Day.

=== Arthur Harrow ===
Arthur Harrow (portrayed by Ethan Hawke) is a cult leader and avatar of Ammit who encourages Marc Spector to embrace his inner darkness.

Hawke also portrays Doctor Harrow, a psychiatrist version that only exists in Steven Grant's and Spector's mind, who helps Grant confront the truth of his mother's death while denying Khonshu's existence.

As of 2026, the character has appeared in one project: the Disney+ series Moon Knight.

=== Tyler Hayward ===
Tyler Hayward (portrayed by Josh Stamberg) is the acting director of S.W.O.R.D., having taken over from Maria Rambeau following her death. He survived the Blip. In 2023, he is shown to have animosity against superheroes, capturing Vision. After colleague Monica Rambeau disappears in Westview, New Jersey, Hayward and other agents set up base there to investigate. He learns Wanda Maximoff is behind the Westview Hex and deems her dangerous and a threat, leading him to kick Rambeau, FBI agent Jimmy Woo and astrophysicist Darcy Lewis off the investigation for having defended Maximoff. He is revealed to have doctored footage of Maximoff stating she had stolen Vision's body while he has been working on a secret illegal project dealing with Vision. He orders a drone launch and sends it into the Hex in a failed attempt to kill Maximoff. The project culminates with Vision being reactivated by exposure to Maximoff's powers from the drone. Hayward's plan to then eliminate Maximoff with Vision is foiled when the android's memories are restored by the created version of Vision inside the Hex. When Maximoff's alternate reality through the Hex is partially taken down, Hayward enters and attempts to kill Maximoff's children Billy and Tommy, but is stopped by Lewis. Afterwards, he is arrested for tampering with evidence, violating the Sokovia Accords, and removed from S.W.O.R.D..

As of 2026, the character has appeared in one project: the Disney+ series WandaVision.

=== Heimdall ===
Heimdall (portrayed by Idris Elba) is the sole protector of the Bifröst in Asgard and Thor's best friend, inspired by the mythical Heimdall in Norse mythology. He maintains the bridge and can see across all worlds in the universe. In 2017, after Hela takes control of Asgard and the Bifröst, he secretly steals the sword needed to control the Bifröst and hides Asgardians from Hela. He takes part in the battle against Hela, after which he escapes with the Asgardian refugees before Asgard's destruction. However, the ship is intercepted by Thanos, who kills Heimdall after the latter transports Hulk to Earth. He is later seen in 2027 welcoming the deceased Jane Foster to the gates of Valhalla.

As of 2026, the character has appeared in six projects: the films Thor, Thor: The Dark World, Avengers: Age of Ultron, Thor: Ragnarok, Avengers: Infinity War, and Thor: Love and Thunder (post-credits cameo). An alternate universe variant of Heimdall appeared in one project: the Disney+ animated series What If...?.

=== Hela ===
Hela (portrayed by Cate Blanchett), also known as the Goddess of Death, is the eldest child of Odin, Thor's father and king of Asgard. She is inspired from the mythical Hel from Norse mythology. Like Thor, her powers are drawn from Asgard and are strongest while she's there. As Odin's executioner, she helped conquer realms that allowed Asgard to grow and prosper. However, being the Goddess of Death, her growing destructive ambition led Odin to cast her out of the realm, which consequently weakened her powers and allowed Asgard to enjoy times of peace within the Nine Realms. Hela's banishment is rescinded upon the death of Odin, at which time she returns to claim her rightful place as queen. Her return is significant as the beginning of Ragnarök, the prophesied destruction of Asgard. She lays waste to Asgard, slays the Warriors Three, and resurrects the fallen Asgardian Berserkers who fought with her eons ago, including her giant wolf, Fenris. Thor, Valkyrie, Hulk, Loki, and the Sakaarian prisoners arrive at Asgard to fight her, but Thor realizes that she can only be defeated with the resurrection of the fire demon Surtur, which will cause Ragnarok. He sends Loki to awaken Surtur, who destroys Asgard and kills Hela while the Asgardians escape in a ship.

As of 2026, the character has appeared in one project: the film Thor: Ragnarok. Alternate universe variants of Hela appeared in two projects: the Disney+ animated series What If...? (voiced by Blanchett as an adult and Liv Zamora as a child); and the mixed reality experience What If...? – An Immersive Story (voiced by Analise Scarpaci).

=== Hercules ===
Hercules (portrayed by Brett Goldstein) is the son of Zeus, based on the Greek mythological deity of the same name. He is sent by his father to hunt down Thor as revenge for stealing Zeus's thunderbolt.

As of 2026, the character has appeared in one project: the film Thor: Love and Thunder (mid-credits cameo).

=== High Evolutionary ===
The High Evolutionary (portrayed by Chukwudi Iwuji) is an alien geneticist who sought to take what he viewed as lower life forms and enhance them into a "perfect" species.

As of 2026, the character has appeared in one project: the film Guardians of the Galaxy Vol. 3.

=== Maria Hill ===
Maria Hill (portrayed by Cobie Smulders) is a former Commander and Deputy Director of S.H.I.E.L.D., appointed by Nick Fury as his right-hand. She oversaw the Avengers Initiative, helped fake Fury’s death, and worked to expose HYDRA. After S.H.I.E.L.D.’s fall, she joined Stark Industries but stayed connected with Phil Coulson, aiding his missions. She rejoined Fury to fight Ultron and assisted in the Battle of Sokovia. Following the Avengers Civil War, she left Stark Industries and joined Fury's new team. She was killed during Thanos’ Snap but resurrected five years later. Resuming her spy career, she helped prevent a Skrull-led attack but was ultimately killed by Gravik in disguise.

As of 2026, the character has appeared in seven projects: the films The Avengers (2012), Captain America: The Winter Soldier, Avengers: Age of Ultron, Avengers: Infinity War (post-credits cameo), and Avengers: Endgame; the Marvel Television series Agents of S.H.I.E.L.D.; and the Disney+ series Secret Invasion. She is also impersonated by the Skrull Soren in the film Spider-Man: Far From Home. An alternate universe variant of Hill appeared in one project: the Disney+ animated series What If...?.

=== Benjamin Hochberg ===
Benjamin Hochberg (portrayed by John Benjamin Hickey) is the district attorney of New York City. He works closely with New York City Mayor Wilson Fisk and his Mental Health Commissioner Heather Glenn to prosecute the vigilantes arrested by the Anti-Vigilante Task Force (AVTF).

As of 2026, the character has appeared in one project: the Disney+ series Daredevil: Born Again. Hickey previously portrayed Peter Lyonne in the Marvel Television series Jessica Jones (2015–2019).

=== Happy Hogan ===
Harold "Happy" Hogan (portrayed by Jon Favreau) is Tony Stark's bodyguard and close friend, and head of security for Stark Industries. Hogan is later assigned by Stark as head of Asset Management for the Avengers. He also serves as a mentor to Peter Parker after Stark's death and is romantically attracted to Parker's aunt, May.

In an alternate universe, Hogan had to deal with an assault from Justin Hammer on Avengers Tower during Christmas. He accidentally took a sample of Hulk's blood, turning him into Freak. Unlike the comic book version of Freak, Hogan can maintain his mind in this form.

A version of Hogan in an alternate universe set in 1602 named Sir Harold "Happy" Hogan is loyal to the royal family and is not friends with Tony Stark who he considers a "madman". He can also turn into Freak in moments of rage, much like Hulk, and is strong enough to match up against his universe's version of Hulk.

As of 2026, the character has appeared in eight projects: the films Iron Man, Iron Man 2, Iron Man 3, Spider-Man: Homecoming, Avengers: Endgame, Spider-Man: Far From Home, Spider-Man: No Way Home, and Deadpool & Wolverine. Alternate universe variants of Hogan appeared in one project: the Disney+ animated series What If...?.

=== Hogun the Grim ===
Hogun (portrayed by Tadanobu Asano), also known as Hogun the Grim, is a member of the Warriors Three of Asgard, depicted as a Vanir grim warrior from Vanaheim. He is killed by Hela in 2017.

As of 2026, the character has appeared in three projects: the films Thor, Thor: The Dark World, and Thor: Ragnarok. An alternate universe variant of Hogun (voiced by David Chen) appeared in one project: the Disney+ animated series What If...?.

=== Craig Hollis / Mister Immortal ===
Craig Hollis (portrayed by David Pasquesi), also known as Mister Immortal, is a superhuman incapable of dying. Over the years, he has used this ability to repeatedly fake his own death and escape various marriages. Compounding the problem, eight of his previous spouses all file suits against him upon learning his secret via an online video displaying his powers leaked by a website called Intelligencia.

As of 2026, the character has appeared in one project: the Disney+ series She-Hulk: Attorney at Law.

=== Phineas Horton ===
Phineas Horton (portrayed by Paul Bettany) is a robotics scientist who created the synthezoid superhero J.I.M. / Synthetic Man in memory of his late son James Horton, though this estranged him from his family.

As of 2026, the character has appeared in one project: the Disney+ series VisionQuest.

=== Lemar Hoskins / Battlestar ===
Sergeant Major Lemar Hoskins (portrayed by Clé Bennett), also known as Battlestar, is the partner of John Walker, the new Captain America. Hoskins and Walker served together in Operation Enduring Freedom and Hoskins laments that they could have saved a lot of lives had they been super soldiers. During a fight with the Flag Smashers, Karli Morgenthau punches him into a concrete pillar, accidentally killing him.

As of 2026, the character has appeared in one project: the Disney+ series The Falcon and the Winter Soldier.

=== Howard the Duck ===
Howard the Duck (voiced by Seth Green) is an anthropomorphic duck who used to be one of the Collector's specimens.

As of 2026, the character has appeared in four projects: the films Guardians of the Galaxy, Guardians of the Galaxy Vol. 2, Avengers: Endgame (cameo), and Guardians of the Galaxy Vol. 3. Alternate universe variants of Howard appeared in one project: the Disney+ animated series What If...?.

=== Curtis Hoyle ===
Curtis Hoyle (portrayed by Jason R. Moore) is a close friend of Frank Castle and former U.S. Navy SARC, who became the leader of a therapy group after losing the lower part of his left leg in combat.

As of 2026, the character has appeared in two projects: the Marvel Television series The Punisher; and the Disney+ special The Punisher: One Last Kill.

=== Hunter B-15 / Verity Willis ===
Hunter B-15 (portrayed by Wunmi Mosaku) is a former agent and new leader of the Time Variance Authority and a brainwashed "variant" who later remembers her family and befriends Loki. In "Science/Fiction", it is revealed that she is a variant of Verity Willis, a pediatrician from New York City in 2012.

As of 2026, the character has appeared in three projects: the Disney+ series Loki; the film Deadpool & Wolverine; and the comic book series TVA.

=== Hunter X-05 / Brad Wolfe ===
Hunter X-05 (portrayed by Rafael Casal), is an agent, later prisoner, of the Time Variance Authority, who assumes an identity on the Sacred Timeline as famous actor Brad Wolfe.

As of 2026, the character has appeared in one project: the Disney+ series Loki.

== I ==
=== Ikaris ===
Ikaris (portrayed by Richard Madden) is an Eternal who can fly and project cosmic energy beams from his eyes. He also has superhuman strength and durability. Throughout history, Ikaris was Sersi's romantic partner before leaving her thousands of years ago. In 2024, after discovering that the Eternals' leader Ajak plans to stop the Emergence, Ikaris feeds her to the Deviants before reuniting with the rest of the Eternals on Earth, betraying the team to uphold Arishem's instructions. However, he is unable to bring himself to kill Sersi, and joins his fellow Eternals to form the Uni-Mind and stop the Emergence of Tiamut. Guilt-ridden, Ikaris commits suicide by flying into the Sun.

Madden described the relationship between Ikaris and Sersi as having "a deep level of romance", and they are "two opposing sides of how they connect with the world", referencing Sersi's growing love for humanity compared to Ikaris's indifference. Madden sought to portray the character in a way that would not come across as being "bored of everything". Director Chloé Zhao was influenced by Zack Snyder's interpretation of Superman in the film Man of Steel (2013) for its authenticity and realness.

As of 2026, the character has appeared in one project: the film Eternals. An alternate universe variant of Ikaris appeared in one project: the Disney+ animated series Marvel Zombies.

=== Jason Ionello ===
Jason Ionello (portrayed by Jorge Lendeborg Jr.) is a student at Midtown School of Science and Technology who hosts the school's news report alongside Betty Brant, whom he is implied to have an unrequited crush on. In 2018, he is a victim of the Blip, but is restored to life in 2023.

As of 2026, the character has appeared in two projects: the films Spider-Man: Homecoming and Spider-Man: Far From Home.

== J ==
=== Darryl Jacobson ===
Darryl Jacobson (portrayed by Daley Pearson) is a New Asgard tour guide.

As of 2026, the character has appeared in two projects: the short film series Team Thor (2016–2018); and the film Thor: Love and Thunder.

=== Luke Jacobson ===
Luke Jacobson (portrayed by Griffin Matthews) is a fashion designer specializing in superhero suits. His clients include Jennifer Walters, Matt Murdock, and Eugene Patilio; the latter kidnaps Jacobson in 2025, though he is rescued by the first two.

As of 2026, the character has appeared in one project: the Disney+ series She-Hulk: Attorney at Law.

=== J. Jonah Jameson ===
J. Jonah Jameson (portrayed by J. K. Simmons) is the bald executive reporter of the sensationalist news website TheDailyBugle.net, intent on similarly defaming Spider-Man after his civilian persona is exposed through the use of doctored footage provided by an associate of the supervillain Mysterio. He eventually hires Betty Brant, one of Parker's classmates from the Midtown School of Science and Technology, as an unpaid intern to aid his ongoing efforts to expose the vigilante along with Ned Leeds and MJ who were involved. He is later contacted by Parker himself in an attempt to lure several displaced villains from the multiverse to the Statue of Liberty to cure and return them to their respective realities, before completely losing memory of Parker alongside the rest of the world as a result of a magic spell cast by Doctor Strange.

As of 2026, the character has appeared in three projects: the films Spider-Man: Far From Home and Spider-Man: No Way Home; and the web series The Daily Bugle. Simmons reprises his role in the Sony's Spider-Man Universe (SSU) film Venom: Let There Be Carnage (2021) (mid-credits cameo). Simmons previously portrayed a different version of Jameson in Sam Raimi's Spider-Man film series (2002–2007).

=== Jentorra ===
Jentorra (portrayed by Katy O'Brian) is the leader of the Freedom Fighters in the Quantum Realm.

As of 2026, the character has appeared in one project: the film Ant-Man and the Wasp: Quantumania.

=== J.I.M. / Synthetic Man ===
J.I.M. (portrayed by Paul Bettany), which stands for Joule Individual Machine, is the world's first synthezoid, built by Phineas Horton in 1939 and modeled after his own image; Vision's human avatar is based on J.I.M. In 1943, J.I.M. was displayed as the Synthetic Man by Phineas at the Stark Expo in Queens, New York City. J.I.M. had a malfunction stemming from his "inability to process complex emotions" that caused him to undergo spontaneous combustion, resulting in both Phineas' death and his own. Phineas' original source code for J.I.M. became the foundation for all the AIs that followed.

As of 2026, the character has appeared in two projects: the film Captain America: The First Avenger (non-speaking cameo); and the Disney+ series VisionQuest.

=== Gabe Jones ===
Gabriel "Gabe" Jones (portrayed Derek Luke) is a member of the Howling Commandos who fought in World War II.

As of 2026, the character has appeared in one project: the film Captain America: The First Avenger. An alternate universe variant of Jones appeared in one project: the Disney+ animated series What If...?.

=== Jorani / Iron Fist ===
Jorani (voiced by Jona Xiao), also known as Iron Fist, is a masked martial artist from K'un-Lun in the late 14th century, and the latest person at the time to possess the ability to call upon the mystical power of the Iron Fist, which allows her to enhance her strength to superhuman levels by focusing her chi. She acquired the Iron Fist by defeating the immortal dragon Shou-Lao, from whose molten heart Jorani drew this power. In 1400 AD, Jorani travels to Wakanda and successfully recovers a small dragon statue containing a piece of vibranium that had been taken by the Wakandan spy Basha.

As of 2026, the character has appeared in one project: the Disney+ animated series Eyes of Wakanda (2025).

== K ==
=== Kaecilius ===
Kaecilius (portrayed by Mads Mikkelsen) is a Master of the Mystic Arts who broke away from the teachings of the Ancient One to become a follower of Dormammu. Leading a band of fellow zealots, Kaecilius seeks to destroy the Sanctums to allow Dormammu to bring Earth into the Dark Dimension. When Doctor Strange manages to defeat Dormammu with a time loop, the Dark Dimension retreats, bringing Kaecilius and his followers with him to experience a hellish eternal life.

Kaecilius was developed as a combination of several comic book characters, ultimately to drive the introduction of bigger villains for the future of the MCU, including the concept of "certain individuals who live in other dimensions." Director Scott Derrickson compared the dynamic to that of Saruman and Sauron in the novel The Lord of the Rings (1954–55), citing the "human relatability" of Kaecilius and Saruman while a "huge and fantastical" villain like Dormammu or Sauron orchestrates events in the background. Recognizing the criticism of past MCU villains, Derrickson said he hoped to show "Kaecilius's point of view and what makes him tick" in the time that he could, and that the character was a "man of ideas" with "watertight logic," comparing him to John Doe from the film Seven (1995) or the Joker from the film The Dark Knight (2008). Mikkelsen's makeup showing the corruption of the Dark Dimension took between 2–3 hours to apply.

As of 2026, the character has appeared in one project: the film Doctor Strange. An alternate universe variant of Kaecilius (voiced by Jared Butler) appeared in one project: the Disney+ animated series What If...?.

=== Jennifer Kale ===
Jennifer Kale (portrayed by Sasheer Zamata) is a witch specializing in potions, beauty guru, social media influencer, and owner of Kale Kare. Hoping to regain her magic and be able to face the legal charges against her, Jennifer joins the coven of witches formed by Agatha Harkness and the "Teen" as they face the trials of the legendary Witches' Road. In the end, Jennifer managed to unlock her magic and survive.

As of 2026, the character has appeared in one project: the Disney+ series Agatha All Along.

=== Kamran ===
Kamran (portrayed by Rish Shah) is a new student at Kamala Khan's high school on whom she develops a crush. Kamala discovers that Kamran is the son of Najma, an inter-dimensional being known as a Clandestine, or djinn, who knew Kamala's great-grandmother Aisha. The Clandestines want to use Kamala's new powers to return home to the Noor dimension, but they grow violent when she hesitates due to the potential danger. Kamran and the Clandestines are captured and imprisoned by Damage Control, but they quickly escape, and Kamran is abandoned by his mother after sustaining an injury during the escape. Najma later sees the error in her ways, sacrificing herself to close the Noor. Her power is transferred to Kamran, who can create hard blue light structures, though the Noor continues to escape through him. He is saved by Kamala, and joins the Red Daggers.

Shah stated that Kamran is able to relate so easily to Kamala because of his "lack of belonging and community," and he feels he is able to express himself culturally around her.

As of 2026, the character has appeared in one project: the Disney+ series Ms. Marvel.

=== Kang the Conqueror ===
Kang the Conqueror (portrayed by Jonathan Majors) is a powerful time-traveling being who exists in many forms, or "variants", across the multiverse.

Kang the Conqueror debuted in Ant-Man and the Wasp: Quantumania. A multiversal traveler in the newly created multiverse who believed that the multiverse was dying due to his variants, he attempted to instigate a war to stop them, only to be captured by the Council of Kangs and exiled to the Quantum Realm. There, he met Janet van Dyne and worked with her to fix his ship's energy core and take them both home. After years of failed attempts, they successfully re-powered it, but she learned of his true nature and used her Pym Particles to prevent him from accessing the core before she eventually escaped the Quantum Realm. Despite this, Kang conquered it, built a new empire, swayed Janet's old Quantum Realm friend Lord Krylar to his side, and recruited Darren Cross into his ranks. In 2026, Janet, Hank Pym, their daughter Hope van Dyne, Scott Lang, and his daughter Cassie are transported to the Quantum Realm, getting separated in the process. Kang captures the Langs and manipulates Scott into retrieving the core; Scott was successful, but Kang obtains the core and betrays Scott. After Cassie instigates a rebellion against him, Kang engages Scott in battle until Hope helps him knock Kang into the core. In the mid-credits scene of Quantumania, the Council of Kangs, led by Immortus, Rama-Tut, and Centurion, discuss the fate of "The Exiled One".

Since 2021, Majors also played alternate versions of the character in the Loki series. The first-season finale sees the debut of He Who Remains, the founder of the Time Variance Authority (TVA). He Who Remains reveals to Loki and Sylvie that he destroyed the original multiverse and created the TVA to control the flow of the "Sacred Timeline" and prevent a new multiverse from forming due to the vast Multiversal War that had broken out in the previous one; after overlooking the timeline for eons, He Who Remains claims that he seeks to retire, restoring free will to allow Loki and Sylvie to decide whether to take his place and lead the TVA, or kill him, create a new multiverse and allow a new Multiversal War to begin. Sylvie chooses to kill He Who Remains, sending Loki back to the TVA. It is later revealed that He Who Remains previously openly ruled the TVA and had a romance with Ravonna Renslayer before wiping their memories of his existence. Loki later travels back in time to before He Who Remains's death and learns that He Who Remains had actually orchestrated everything that had occurred after his death, including Loki's time slipping. He Who Remains insists that the only option is to kill Sylvie and prevent his death to keep the timeline from branching so as to keep his variants away. While Loki nearly gives in and saves He Who Remains, he instead finds another solution by weaving together the timeline branches into Yggdrasil with Loki at the heart of it maintaining them.

The Loki second-season episode "1893" sees Miss Minutes and Ravonna Renslayer follow a roadmap left by He Who Remains before his death to create a new version of him in the new Multiverse; on finding a young Victor Timely as a child in the 19th Century, they leave him with Ouroboros's TVA handbook, before proceeding to later on in his life in 1893, when as an adult, he now is an eager scientist seeking to build a time loom based on his reading of the handbook. After Loki and Mobius M. Mobius find Victor at one of his shows, they attempt to bring him back to the TVA to help fix a problem with their Time loom (locked to He Who Remains's temporal aura), only to be interrupted by Miss Minutes, Renslayer, and Sylvie, the latter two attempting to kill Victor before changing their minds, and the former attempting to seduce him. After Victor and Sylvie send Miss Minutes and Renslayer back to the Citadel at the End of Time, where He Who Remains's corpse is now rotting, Miss Minutes decides to tell Renslayer about her history, while Loki and Mobius bring Victor to the TVA. When Timely arrives at the TVA, he meets B-15, Casey, and O.B. When they prepare the device to fix the loom, he is kidnapped by Renslayer, Miss Minutes, and X-5, and while they interrogate him, Sylvie, with her charm, causes X-5 to prune Renslayer and Miss Minutes is deactivated. When Timely tries to fix the loom, he is killed. After Loki travels by controlling the time he spends by focusing on one person, Timely survives and manages to fix the loom, but the infinite number of branches make it mathematically impossible. Subsequently, Loki manages to weave the branches into Yggdrasil, allowing the Multiverse to survive. Afterwards, in 1868, a young Victor variant does not receive the TVA handbook, sending him on a different path.

As of 2026, the character has appeared in one project: the film Ant-Man and the Wasp: Quantumania. Alternate universe variants of Kang appeared in two projects: the Disney+ series Loki; and the film Ant-Man and the Wasp: Quantumania.

=== Kareem / Red Dagger ===
Kareem (portrayed by Aramis Knight) is a member of the Red Daggers who was chosen to hold their titular warrior mantle of Red Dagger. He encounters Kamala Khan on her trip in Karachi and befriends her, taking her to meet his friends and helping her fight against the Clandestines. He later helps provide refuge for Khan's friend Kamran.

As of 2026, the character has appeared in one project: the Disney+ series Ms. Marvel.

=== Karen ===
Karen (voiced by Jennifer Connelly) is an artificial intelligence created by Tony Stark and installed in the second iteration of the Spider-Man Suit. It was designed to work alongside and aid Peter Parker in his duties as Spider-Man provided that the young hero completed the Training Wheels Protocol. Following Quentin Beck's attacks in Europe, the Stark Spider-Man suit was destroyed, eliminating Karen as well.

As of 2026, the character has appeared in two projects: the films Spider-Man: Homecoming and Spider-Man: Far From Home.

=== Vasily Karpov ===
Vasily Karpov (portrayed by Gene Farber) is a Hydra official who was given the responsibility of handling and deploying the Winter Soldier. In 1991, he sent the Winter Soldier to assassinate Howard and Maria Stark. In 2016, Karpov is interrogated and killed by Helmut Zemo for information about the Winter Soldier.

As of 2026, the character has appeared in one project: the film Captain America: Civil War. Alternate universe variants of Karpov appeared in one project: the Disney+ animated series What If...?.

=== Kazi ===
Kazimierz "Kazi" Kazimierczak (portrayed by Fra Fee) is a prominent member of the Tracksuit Mafia. He is the second in command and personal sign interpreter to Maya Lopez, who has been his friend since childhood. He was involved in Fisk's plot to take control over New York City and helped arrange Ronin's massacre of several Tracksuit Mafia leaders, including Maya's father. Kazi was ordered by Fisk to kill Kate's mother Eleanor Bishop, although she was rescued by Clint Barton and Kate Bishop. Kazi was then stabbed by Lopez after she found out about his involvement in her father's death.

As of 2026, the character has appeared in one project: the Disney+ series Hawkeye.

=== Harley Keener ===
Harley Keener (portrayed by Ty Simpkins) is a child from Tennessee who, in 2013, helps Tony Stark after his mansion is destroyed and amid attacks by the "Mandarin" (Aldrich Killian). In 2023, Keener attends Stark's funeral.

As of 2026, the character has appeared in two projects: the films Iron Man 3 and Avengers: Endgame (cameo).

=== Kamala Khan / Ms. Marvel ===
==== Khan family ====
Kamala Khan's family play an important role in her life. Her parents are Muneeba (portrayed by Zenobia Shroff) and Yusuf Khan, and her older brother is Aamir Khan (portrayed by Saagar Shaikh). Aamir's fiancée and later wife is Tyesha Hillman (portrayed by Travina Springer). Muneeba's mother is Sana (portrayed by Samina Ahmad), who still lives in Karachi. Sana's mother was Aisha (portrayed by Mehwish Hayat), a Clandestine who fell in love with Sana's father Hasan (portrayed by Fawad Khan) and decided to stay on Earth and passed the mystical bangle down through the generations, before Aisha was killed by fellow Clandestine Najma.

As of 2026, the characters have appeared in two projects: the Disney+ series Ms. Marvel; and the film The Marvels. An alternate universe variant of Muneeba appeared in one project: the Disney+ animated series Marvel Zombies (voice-only cameo).

=== Yusuf Khan ===
Yusuf Khan (portrayed by Mohan Kapur) is a Pakistani-American citizen from Jersey City who works as an assistant bank manager at New York Mutual. He is also the husband of Muneeba Khan, and the father of Aamir and Kamala Khan, the latter being the superhero Ms. Marvel.

As of 2026, the character has appeared in three projects: the Disney+ series Ms. Marvel and Daredevil: Born Again; and the film The Marvels.

=== Khonshu ===
Khonshu (motion-captured by Karim El Hakim, voiced by F. Murray Abraham) is the Egyptian moon god, an outcast amongst the gods for waging a "one-god war on perceived injustices", thus necessitating him to find and use his avatar, Marc Spector. He is based on the Egyptian deity of the same name.

As of 2026, the character has appeared in one project: the Disney+ series Moon Knight. An alternate universe variant of Khonshu appeared in one project: the Disney+ animated series Marvel Zombies.

=== Aldrich Killian / Mandarin ===
Aldrich Killian (portrayed by Guy Pearce) is the co-developer of the Extremis virus. He is also depicted as the founder of Advanced Idea Mechanics (A.I.M.). Starting out as a sickly individual snubbed by Tony Stark in the past, he swore revenge. Years later, Killian participates in Maya Hansen's development of Extremis to cure himself, founds a terrorist movement with a group of Extremis-enhanced soldiers under his command, and poses as the Mandarin to ruin Stark, only to be killed by the Extremis-enhanced Pepper Potts.

As of 2026, the character has appeared in one project: the film Iron Man 3.

=== Angie Kim ===
Angie Kim (portrayed by Ruibo Qian) is a New York Police Department (NYPD) detective. She works closely with Daredevil, Cherry Pitts, and the resistance against New York City Mayor Wilson Fisk and his Anti-Vigilante Task Force (AVTF).

As of 2026, the character has appeared in one project: the Disney+ series Daredevil: Born Again. Qian previously portrayed Mei in the Marvel Television series Jessica Jones.

=== John King ===
John King (portrayed by Manny Montana) is a knife-wielding member of a Chicago street crew led by his cousin, Parker Robbins / The Hood.

As of 2026, the character has appeared in one project: the Disney+ series Ironheart.

=== Kingo ===
Kingo (portrayed by Kumail Nanjiani) is an Eternal who can project cosmic energy projectiles from his hands. Enamored with fame, Kingo becomes a popular Bollywood film actor and director to blend in on Earth. He also has a production company in Mumbai.

As of 2026, the character has appeared in one project: the film Eternals. Alternate universe variants of Kingo appeared in one project: the Disney+ animated series What If...?.

=== Ulysses Klaue ===
Ulysses Klaue (portrayed by Andy Serkis) is a South African black-market arms dealer, smuggler, and gangster who is notorious for having stolen a quarter-ton of vibranium from the Wakandans in 1992, with assistance Wakandan prince N'Jobu. By 2015, Klaue is operating out of an abandoned shipping freighter outside of Johannesburg when he is approached Ultron and the Maximoff twins. Ultron coerces him into surrendering his stockpile of Vibranium, but not without compensating Klaue financially for the metal. When Klaue presumes he is an agent of Tony Stark, an old acquaintance of his, Ultron severs Klaue's left arm in a fit of rage.

By 2016, Klaue has replaced his missing limb with a prosthetic arm built from a piece of Wakandan mining gear, that doubles as a sonic cannon. He works with N'Jobu's son, Killmonger, to steal and sell Vibranium on the black market. He is captured by T'Challa in South Korea and then freed by Killmonger until the latter betrays and shoots him dead, using his corpse to gain entrance into Wakanda.

As of 2026, the character has appeared in two projects: the films Avengers: Age of Ultron and Black Panther. An alternate universe variant of Klaue appeared in one project: the Disney+ animated series What If...?.

=== Cameron Klein ===
Cameron Klein (portrayed by Aaron Himelstein) is a S.H.I.E.L.D. agent and technician who stayed loyal to Steve Rogers during the Hydra uprising. He was later recruited by Fury and became one of his allies during the Battle of Sokovia and Infinity War.

As of 2026, the character has appeared in two projects: the films Captain America: The Winter Soldier and Avengers: Age of Ultron.

=== Korath ===
Korath (portrayed by Djimon Hounsou) is a member of the Starforce during the Kree-Skrull War before becoming Ronan the Accuser's enforcer, during which he turns against Thanos and fights the Guardians of the Galaxy, only to be killed by Drax.

As of 2026, the character has appeared in two projects: the films Guardians of the Galaxy and Captain Marvel. An alternate universe variant of Korath appeared in one project: the Disney+ animated series What If...?.

=== Korg ===
Korg (voiced and motion-captured by Taika Waititi) is a Kronan warrior, who was forced to participate in the Contest of Champions on Sakaar, along with his best friend, Miek. He later leads a rebellion against the Grandmaster and escapes the planet with the help of Thor with the fight to protect the survivors of Asgard against Hela, went with the survivors that escaped from Thanos's attack on their ship to protect them, and travels to Earth. By 2023, he resides in Tønsberg, Norway, now named New Asgard, boarding with Thor and Miek, and playing online games, eventually marrying another Kronan named Dwayne by 2026.

As of 2026, the character has appeared in three projects: the films Thor: Ragnarok, Avengers: Endgame and Thor: Love and Thunder, with Waititi also directing the two Thor films. Alternate universe variants of Korg appeared in one project: the Disney+ animated series What If...?.

=== Kro ===
Kro (voiced by Bill Skarsgård) is a Deviant who despises the Eternals. He is later killed by Thena.

As of 2026, the character has appeared in one project: the film Eternals.

=== Krugarr ===
Krugarr (motion-captured by Jared Gore) is a mute Ravager captain who wields mystical powers and communicates solemnly through his sorcery.

As of 2026, the character has appeared in two projects: the films Guardians of the Galaxy Vol. 2 and Guardians of the Galaxy Vol. 3.

=== Heinz Kruger ===
Heinz Kruger (portrayed by Richard Armitage) is the Red Skull's top assassin who kills Abraham Erskine before ingesting cyanide.

As of 2026, the character has appeared in one project: the film Captain America: The First Avenger. An alternate universe variant of Kruger appeared in one project: the Disney+ animated series What If...?.

=== Krylar ===
Lord Krylar (portrayed by Bill Murray) is the governor of Axia, a city located in the Quantum Realm.

As of 2026, the character has appeared in one project: the film Ant-Man and the Wasp: Quantumania.

=== Kurt ===
Kurt (portrayed by David Dastmalchian) is a friend and roommate of Scott Lang and Luis who works as the team's hacker during heists. He, Luis, and Dave are together known as the "Three Wombats".

As of 2026, the character has appeared in two projects: the films Ant-Man and Ant-Man and the Wasp. An alternate universe variant of Kurt appeared in one project: the Disney+ animated series What If...?.

=== Kwai Jun-Fan ===
Kwai Jun-Fan (voiced by Allen Deng) is a young boy in an alternate universe set in the 1870s. In 1872, Jun-Fan assists Xu Shang-Chi and Kate Bishop in rescuing a group of Chinese immigrants, among whom is Jun-Fan's father, who had been kidnapped by the Hood.

As of 2026, the character has appeared in one project: the Disney+ animated series What If...?.

== L ==
=== Cassie Lang ===
Cassie Lang as she appeared in the MCU films: Abby Ryder Fortson (left) as a child in Ant-Man and Ant-Man and the Wasp, Emma Fuhrmann (middle) as a teenager in Avengers: Endgame, and Kathryn Newton (right) as a young adult in Ant-Man and the Wasp: Quantumania and Avengers: Doomsday.

Cassandra "Cassie" Lang (portrayed by Abby Ryder Fortson in Ant-Man and Ant-Man and the Wasp, Emma Fuhrmann in Avengers: Endgame, and Kathryn Newton in Ant-Man and the Wasp: Quantumania and Avengers: Doomsday) is the daughter of Maggie and Scott Lang. Her parents eventually divorce based on her father's criminal activity and her mother forms a relationship with police officer Jim Paxton. In 2015, she is held hostage by Darren Cross / Yellowjacket and then learns her father is Ant-Man. In 2018, she expresses interest in being her father's partner and meets Hope van Dyne. She then survives the Blip and lives five years without her father, becoming a teenager. In 2023, she is reunited with her father. With interest in the Quantum Realm, Cassie works with Hank Pym and van Dyne to build a quantum satellite as well as her own purple version of an "Ant-Man" suit. In 2026, she shows her satellite to her father, but it gets hacked and she, her father, van Dyne, Janet van Dyne, and Pym are sucked into the Quantum Realm. There, she and her father learn about the multiverse and face Kang the Conqueror, as well as meeting Cross again, now as M.O.D.O.K.

As of 2026, the character has appeared in five projects: the films Ant-Man, Ant-Man and the Wasp, Avengers: Endgame, and Ant-Man and the Wasp: Quantumania. She will return in the film Avengers: Doomsday.

=== Scott Lang / Ant-Man ===
==== Lang family ====
Maggie (portrayed by Judy Greer) is the former wife of Scott Lang, the mother of Cassie Lang and the wife of Jim Paxton (portrayed by Bobby Cannavale) who is a police officer in the San Francisco Police Department. Maggie met Scott Lang, the man who would become her husband, and fell in love with him despite knowing his past criminal activities. Lang supported her husband unconditionally until she became pregnant with their daughter, Cassandra. After Cassie's birth, Lang made Scott promise he would leave his criminal lifestyle behind, even though he claimed he was only stealing from crooks.

As of 2026, the characters have appeared in two projects: the films Ant-Man and Ant-Man and the Wasp.

=== Laufey ===
Laufey (portrayed by Colm Feore) is the king of the Frost Giants based on Laufey in Norse mythology. He is the biological father of Loki, and abandoned him as a child due to his small size. Laufey has a strong hatred for Odin for his defeat in battle when he tried to conquer Earth. Loki convinces Laufey to take over Asgard himself, but betrays and kills Laufey to prove himself worthy of Odin.

As of 2026, the character has appeared in one project: the film Thor. An alternate universe variant of Laufey (voiced by Andrew Morgado) appeared in one project: the Disney+ animated series What If...?.

=== Laura / X-23 ===
Laura (portrayed by Dafne Keen), also known as X-23, is a mutant created from Logan's DNA who inherited her genetic donor's adamantium claws and advanced regenerative capabilities. She is part of the rebellion of variants that fight against Cassandra Nova in the Void.

As of 2026, the character has appeared in one project: the film Deadpool & Wolverine. Keen reprises her role from 20th Century Fox's X-Men film series.

=== Remy LeBeau / Gambit ===
Remy LeBeau (portrayed by Channing Tatum), also known as Gambit, is a mutant with the ability to charge objects with kinetic energy, causing them to explode on impact. He is part of the rebellion of variants that fight against Cassandra Nova in the Void. He has no memory of life before he appeared in the Void, referencing his unproduced self-titled film.

As of 2026, the character has appeared in one project: the film Deadpool & Wolverine. He will return in the film Avengers: Doomsday.

=== Ned Leeds ===
Ned Leeds (portrayed by Jacob Batalon) is Peter Parker's best friend and the first person other than Tony Stark and Happy Hogan to discover Parker's identity as Spider-Man. He falls victim to the Blip in 2018 but is revived in 2023. In 2024, following the exposure and incrimination of Parker's secret identity to the world by Mysterio, Ned, MJ, and Parker's university applications are all subsequently rejected due to the controversy, in spite of the lifting of his criminal charges. When villains from alternate realities are brought into their universe due to the failure of Stephen Strange's spell to make the world forget Spider-Man's identity, Ned and MJ help Parker collect the displaced villains into the Sanctum Sanctorum. Following a staged coup by the alternate Norman Osborn that results in the villains breaking out of captivity and Peter's Aunt May losing her life in the process when she is killed by Osborn, Ned accidentally summons two alternate Spider-Men, referred to as "Peter-Two" and "Peter-Three," who aid the main universe's Parker in curing the villains. Ned and MJ share a final goodbye with Parker before Strange casts a spell which wipes the world's memories of Parker and sends the displaced individuals back to their realities, relinquishing Ned's friendship with Parker completely. After graduating from MIT after four years, Leeds and MJ rented an apartment together in New York City. During the housewarming party, Leeds shows up with Parker, who had brought flowers as a welcome gift and presented them to him before introducing himself as Maynard, pretending to be a neighbor. He demonstrates his invention called the "Spidey Tracker", designed to track Spider-Man's location, and tries to uncover his identity. Leeds notices that MJ invited Spider-Man to spend time with him, upon hearing about the experience with the telepath named Jean Grey, realizing that the director of the DODC, Bill Metzger, had lied to Spider-Man about Jean's motives, and rushes off to rescue her after his conversation with Yelena Belova. After Jean loses control of her abilities by psionically locking down the city around her, Leeds and MJ are frozen in place. When things return to normal, Leeds views a news report stating that Spider-Man was seriously injured. After Parker recovers, he reintroduces himself to Ned with their secret handshake. Ned is a Filipino-American.

As of 2026, the character has appeared in seven projects: the films Spider-Man: Homecoming, Avengers: Infinity War (cameo), Avengers: Endgame (cameo), Spider-Man: Far From Home, Spider-Man: No Way Home, and Spider-Man: Brand New Day; and the web series The Daily Bugle.

=== Darcy Lewis ===
Dr. Darcy Lewis (portrayed by Kat Dennings) is an original character in the MCU, often serving as comic relief. In 2011 and 2013 she originated as a political science major at Culver University and volunteer research assistant to astrophysicist Jane Foster because Darcy needed the credit for college. By 2023, she has a doctorate in astrophysics.

As of 2026, the character has appeared in four projects: the films Thor, Thor: The Dark World, and Thor: Love and Thunder; and the Disney+ series WandaVision. Alternate universe variants of Lewis appeared in one project: the Disney+ animated series What If...?. The character made her comic book debut in Scarlet Witch (2023), subsequently appearing in Scarlet Witch & Quicksilver (2024) and Women of Marvel ('Witch House') (2024).

=== Lonnie Lincoln / Tombstone ===
Alonzo "Lonnie" Lincoln (portrayed by Marvin Jones III), also known as Tombstone, is an albino crime boss with near-indestructible skin and superhuman strength.

In an alternate universe, Lonnie (voiced by Eugene Byrd) is a former football player and classmate of Peter Parker at Rockford T. Bales High School. He reluctantly joins the 110th Street gang to stop his younger brother Andre from joining them. He later earns the nickname Tombstone after saving the gang's leader, Big Donovan, from Mac Gargan. During a later battle with Gargan, Donovan flees while Lonnie is exposed to Diox-3, a mysterious gas developed by Otto Octavius and gains superhuman strength and durability. With Donovan's departure, Lonnie becomes the new leader of the 110th.

As of 2026, the character has appeared in one project: the film Spider-Man: Brand New Day. An alternate universe variant of Lonnie appeared in one project: the Disney+ animated series Your Friendly Neighborhood Spider-Man. Jones previously voiced a different version of Lonnie in the Sony Pictures Animation film Spider-Man: Into the Spider-Verse (2018).

==== Lincoln family ====
Lonnie Lincoln's family plays an important role in his life in an alternate universe. Mr. and Mrs. Lincoln (voiced by Phil LaMarr and Erica Luttrell, respectively) are Lonnie's parents, and Andre Lincoln (voiced by Matte Martinez) is Lonnie's younger brother.

As of 2026, the characters have appeared in one project: the Disney+ animated series Your Friendly Neighborhood Spider-Man.

=== List ===
Dr. List (portrayed by Henry Goodman) is a Hydra scientist who conducted the experimentation on Loki's scepter and the twins Pietro and Wanda Maximoff. Dr. List later became one of the heads of Hydra following the death of Daniel Whitehall, as mentioned by Kebo, and clashed with Phil Coulson's S.H.I.E.L.D. team. During the Avengers' attack on Hydra's Sokovian base, Dr. List was killed by Tony Stark.

As of 2026, the character has appeared in three projects: the films Captain America: The Winter Soldier (mid-credits cameo) and Avengers: Age of Ultron; and the Marvel Television series Agents of S.H.I.E.L.D.

=== Liz ===
Liz (portrayed by Laura Harrier) is a senior at Midtown School of Science and Technology who leads the decathlon team. She is the daughter of Adrian Toomes and initial love interest of Peter Parker. She leaves Peter's school and moves states upon her father's arrest.

As of 2026, the character has appeared in one project: the film Spider-Man: Homecoming.

=== London Master ===
The London Master (portrayed by Daniel Swain) is a Master of the Mystic Arts.

As of 2026, the character has appeared in one project: the film Doctor Strange in the Multiverse of Madness. An alternate universe variant of the London Master appeared in one project: the Disney+ animated series Marvel Zombies.

=== Maya Lopez / Echo ===
==== Lopez family ====
William Lopez and Taloa (portrayed by Katarina Ziervogel) are the parents of Maya Lopez. Henry "Black Crow" Lopez (portrayed by Chaske Spencer) is Maya's uncle and William's brother, who owns a local roller-skating rink and is still connected to Fisk's criminal empire. Chula (portrayed by Tantoo Cardinal) is Maya's estranged grandmother and a descendant of the Choctaw tribe. Bonnie (portrayed by Devery Jacobs) is the cousin of Maya Lopez and a descendant of the Choctaw tribe, who became a member of the Tamaha Fire Department in her adulthood. Biscuits (portrayed by Cody Lightning) is the cousin of Maya Lopez and a member of the Choctaw tribe. Skully (portrayed by Graham Greene) is a grandfather-figure to Maya, who owns the town pawn shop. Unlike other members of Maya's estranged family, Skully is more willing to find a way forward in their relationship.

As of 2026, the characters have appeared in one project: the Disney+ series Echo (2024).

=== William Lopez ===
William Lopez (portrayed by Zahn McClarnon) is the father of Maya Lopez and the former leader of the Tracksuit Mafia. He was killed by Clint Barton during his time as Ronin in the Blip, though the events were revealed to have been orchestrated by William's boss Wilson Fisk / Kingpin.

As of 2026, the character has appeared in two projects: the Disney+ series Hawkeye and Echo.

=== Love ===
Love (portrayed by India Rose Hemsworth) is the daughter of Gorr the God Butcher and the last of their race. After her death, Gorr asks the cosmic wish-granting entity Eternity to bring Love back to life. Following her resurrection, Gorr, shortly before his own death, requests Thor to take care of Love, and she becomes his adopted daughter.

As of 2026, the character has appeared in one project: the film Thor: Love and Thunder. She will return in the film Avengers: Doomsday.

=== Luis ===
Luis (portrayed by Michael Peña) is Scott Lang's best friend, serving as his ally and former criminal liaison. He has a particular knack for storytelling, and often serves as comic relief in the Ant-Man films.

As of 2026, the character has appeared in two projects: the films Ant-Man and Ant-Man and the Wasp.

=== Lylla ===
Lylla (voiced by Linda Cardellini) is a genetically augmented otter with cybernetic limbs who was created by the High Evolutionary as part of Batch 89, along with Teefs, Floor, and Rocket. After discovering that their creator intended to kill them, the group attempt to escape, only for the High Evolutionary and his goons to kill all of them except for Rocket. In the present, Rocket briefly reunites with his friends during a near-death experience, where Lylla encourages Rocket to keep on living.

As of 2026, the character has appeared in one project: the film Guardians of the Galaxy Vol. 3.

== See also ==
- Characters of the Marvel Cinematic Universe: M–Z
- Features of the Marvel Cinematic Universe
- Species of the Marvel Cinematic Universe
- Teams and organizations of the Marvel Cinematic Universe
