= Olivia Booth-Ford =

English actress

- Born: 3 July 2010 (age 16); England, UK
- Occupation: Actress
- Years active: 2018–present

Olivia Booth-Ford (born 3 July 2010) is an English actress. She is known for her roles as Sara Grey in the Marvel Cinematic Universe superhero film Spider-Man: Brand New Day (2026) and Leoni Tennant in the BBC drama series Waterloo Road (2026–).

== Early life ==
Booth-Ford grew up in Warrington, Cheshire.

== Career ==
Booth-Ford signed with a talent agent at the age of 7. She featured in the Jude Law-produced anthology series Do Not Disturb starring Monica Bellucci. She starred in the documentary mini series The Enfield Poltergeist portraying Janet Hodgson. One of her first big film roles was playing the minor part of Cayla in the fantasy film The School for Good and Evil.

In 2026, it was revealed Ford alongside Andrew Readman would be joining series 17 of the BBC school drama series Waterloo Road. She gained further prominence for portraying the telepathic Sara Grey in the Marvel superhero film Spider-Man: Brand New Day. Despite her playing the older sister of Sadie Sink's character Jean Grey, she is in fact 8 years younger than Sink. She received acclaim for how convincingly the siblings were portrayed despite the age gap.

== Filmography ==
=== Film ===
| Year | Title | Role | Notes |
|---|---|---|---|
| 2018 | Gloria | Amy | Short |
| 2021 | Joy | Joy | Short |
| 2022 | The School for Good and Evil | Cayla | |
| 2023 | This Is Ours | Finch | Short |
| 2025 | Do Not Disturb | Stella | |
| 2026 | Spider-Man: Brand New Day | Sara Grey | |

=== Television ===
| Year | Title | Role | Notes |
|---|---|---|---|
| 2019 | Do Not Disturb | Stella | Episode; Child's Play |
| 2023 | The Enfield Poltergeist | Janet Hodgson | 4 episodes |
| 2026–present | Waterloo Road | Leoni Tennant | |
