= Christopher Jeffers =

English actor and dancer (born 1988)

- Born: Christopher Edwin Leigh Jeffers; May 1988 (age 38); Bury, Greater Manchester, England
- Education: Bury College
- Occupations: Actor; dancer
- Television: The Other One; Waterloo Road

Christopher Edwin Leigh Jeffers (born May 1988) is an English actor and dancer. After graduating from theatre school, he worked at Disneyland Paris, before going onto appear in various stage productions across the UK. Jeffers then began making minor appearances in British television series including 4 O'Clock Club and Coronation Street, as well as dancing in projects such as Rocketman and Bridgerton. From 2020 to 2022, he starred in the BBC's The Other One, and since 2025, he has portrayed Mitch Swift in the BBC school drama series Waterloo Road.

== Life and career ==
Christopher Edwin Leigh Jeffers was born in Bury, Greater Manchester, in May 1988. Jeffers attended Castlebrook High School, subsequently studying at Bury College from 2004 to 2006, for which he has accredited his time there with giving him his start in entertainment. He earned a fully paid scholarship at the Midlands Academy of Dance and Drama, after which he worked at Disneyland Paris. Following his time at Disneyland, Jeffers was cast in various stage productions including Fame, Man in the Mirror, Cinderella, Aladdin, Dick Whittington, Dance Fever Starlight Express and The Bodyguard.

Jeffers made his television debut in 2015 in an episode of CBBC's 4 O'Clock Club. That same year, he was a professional backing dancer for Take That's Brit Awards performance of "Let in the Sun". In 2019, he danced in the musical film Rocketman, as well as appearing in an episode of ITV1's Coronation Street as Rich. In 2020, he began appearing in the BBC series The Other One as Callum. He appeared in the series until 2022. Also in 2020, he appeared in the Netflix film Eurovision Song Contest: The Story of Fire Saga as Johnny John John, a Swedish rapper. In 2022, he appeared as a featured dancer in three episode of Netflix's Bridgerton. Then in 2024, he appeared in the BBC Three fantasy series Domino Day. He then had a recurring role in the BBC daytime series Father Brown. In 2025, Jeffers was cast in the regular role of Mitch Swift in the BBC school drama series Waterloo Road. His character joined as an SEN co-ordinator and love interest for Joe Casey (James Baxter) from the sixteenth series.

== Filmography ==
Year	Title	Role	Notes
2015	4 O'Clock Club	CJ Dean	Episode: "Theatre"
2018	Mariah: The Diva, The Demons, The Drama	Nick Cannon	Television film
2019	Rocketman	Dancer	Film
2019	Coronation Street	Rich	Guest role
2020	Ant & Dec's Saturday Night Takeaway	Magic Mike Dancer	1 episode
2020–2022	The Other One	Callum	Main role
2020	Eurovision Song Contest: The Story of Fire Saga	Johnny John John	Film
2020	The Gays Days	Kyle Ewan	Short film
2022	Death on the Nile	Dancer	Film
2022	Bridgerton	Dancer	3 episodes
2022	Prancer: A Christmas Tale	Tevin	Film
2023	A Whole Lifetime with Jamie Demetriou	Vin	Guest role
2024	Domino Day	Mike	Recurring role
2024	We Might Regret This	Scott	1 episode
2025	Father Brown	Colin Byers	1 episode
2025	Riot Women	Mr. Jeffreys	1 episode
2025–present	Waterloo Road	Mitch Swift	Main role
