= Shed Productions =

UK production company

- Company type: Subsidiary
- Industry: Television production
- Founded: 1998; 28 years ago
- Founders: Ann McManus; Maureen Chadwick; Eileen Gallagher; Brian Park
- Defunct: 2015; 11 years ago
- Headquarters: London, United Kingdom
- Key people: Eileen Gallagher; Brian Park; Maureen Chadwick; Ann McManus; Liz Lake; Ros Taylor; Lee Mason; Spencer Campbell
- Products: Bad Girls; Bad Girls: The Musical; Footballers' Wives; Footballers' Wives: Extra Time; Footballers' Wives TV; The Fugitives; Bombshell; Waterloo Road; Rock Rivals; Hope Springs
- Parent: Warner Bros. Television Productions UK
- Website: www.shedproductions.com

Shed Productions, part of Warner Bros. Television Productions UK, was an independent UK television production company, specialising in contemporary, original drama programming and content. It was established in 1998 by Eileen Gallagher, Brian Park, Ann McManus and Maureen Chadwick, who previously worked together at Granada Television. As of October 2015 it no longer exists as a company with all properties folded into Wall to Wall.

== Company history ==
Shed's first major production, the hit drama Bad Girls was commissioned by ITV in the summer of 1998 and proved to be a huge success with viewers, becoming one of the UK's most consistently successful dramas during its eight-series run.

In 2000, following the success of Bad Girls, Shed won a major new commission for primetime ITV, Footballers' Wives. During the five series it was on air, Footballers' Wives became probably the most talked-about UK drama of recent times and spawned the popular ITV2 spin-off Footballers' Wives Extra Time, and factual entertainment series Footballers' Wives TV which aired on ITV2 in 2005.

2005 also saw Shed's first foray into the realms of children's television when seven-part drama The Fugitives was commissioned by CITV. Starring Maureen Lipman, Jack Ellis and Melanie Hill, the show centred on two runaway teenagers and tackled head-on the serious subject of human cloning.

In 2006, Shed received its first commission from BBC One, Waterloo Road, a drama series about a failing comprehensive school in Rochdale. After proving to be a huge hit with viewers, especially the valuable 16- to 24-year-old audience, Waterloo Road was immediately re-commissioned by the BBC for a second series. Remaining consistently popular with the viewers, seven series of Waterloo Road have so far been aired (as of 2012). In November 2011, it was announced by the BBC and Shed Media that production on the show would be relocating from Rochdale to Greenock, Scotland as part of the BBC's aim to produce more programming in the country. A further 50 episodes were commissioned for broadcast between 2012 and 2014, with the first to begin airing from September 2012. Filming on the eighth series began in April 2012 at the former Greenock Academy, and began airing from August 2012. Production on a ninth series began on 1 April 2013. It was announced on 2 April 2014 that series 10 would be the final series of the show, production on Series 10 ended in August 2014. In September 2021, it was announced that Waterloo Road would return with a new series, with production returning to the Greater Manchester area.

One-off drama Catwalk Dogs – written by Men Behaving Badly creator Simon Nye and starring Kris Marshall and Georgia MacKenzie – aired on ITV1 in 2007 and introduced viewers to the world of dog shows. This was followed in 2008 by Rock Rivals, another ITV commission that starred Michelle Collins and Sean Gallagher as Karina and Mal Faith – the bickering judges on a phenomenally successful TV talent show.

In 2008, BBC One commissioned Hope Springs, a new eight-part drama from Shed Productions through BBC Scotland. The show, which will star Annette Crosbie and Alex Kingston, is about four female ex-cons who find themselves in hiding in a remote Scottish village called Hope Springs after their plans to start a new life in Barbados go awry. Filming has begun in summer 2008 in the Lowland village of Wanlockhead. The series began airing on BBC One on Sunday 7 June 2009.

Following on from Hope Springs will be Dirty Something, a drama series set around the lives and loves of Notting Hill Tories.

== Productions ==
=== Television productions ===
Programme	Series	Episodes	Duration	Network
Bad Girls	8	107	1999–2006	ITV1
Footballers' Wives	5	42	2002–2006	ITV1
The Fugitives	1	7	2005	CITV
Footballers' Wives TV	1	8	2005	ITV2
Footballers' Wives: Extra Time	2	32	2005–2006	ITV2
Bombshell	1	7	2006	TV One
Waterloo Road	10	200	2006–2015	BBC One (2006–2015); BBC Three (2015)
Rock Rivals	1	8	2008	ITV1
Hope Springs	1	8	2009	BBC One

1. Bombshell has never been broadcast in the UK. It was produced in 2004 and initially intended to air on ITV1 in February 2005; however, it never did. The series first premiered in New Zealand on TV One in 2006.
2. Waterloo Road was recommissioned for a new series in 2021, and commenced airing in January 2023, with production returning to Greater Manchester.

=== Other productions ===
- Bad Girls: Most Wanted (2004)
  - Presented by Jack Ellis, this behind-the-scenes special broadcast on ITV2 following the Series Six finale and ranked the top 10 most popular prisoners of the series with additional outtakes, bloopers, and scenes from the then upcoming Bad Girls: The Musical.
- Footballers' Wives: Exposed (2004)
  - Behind-the-scenes documentary of the series.
- Catwalk Dogs (2007)
  - Television film broadcast on ITV.

== US remakes ==
=== Football Wives ===
After Footballers' Wives proved such a hit with US viewers when it was broadcast on BBC America, US network ABC commissioned a pilot for an American version of the show, named Football Wives. Although based on the UK original and using similar plots, the pilot featured American football rather than association football, and a completely new cast, including Lucy Lawless, Gabrielle Union, Eddie Cibrian, Kiele Sanchez, and James Van Der Beek.

The pilot was not picked up due to budget reasons, however a number of websites have speculated that Football Wives was shelved due to potential conflicts with the National Football League.

== Bad Girls - The Musical ==
Bad Girls - The Musical is an original British musical that was developed by the creators of the television series, Maureen Chadwick and Ann McManus, in collaboration with composer and lyricist Kath Gotts, and director Maggie Norris.

Bad Girls – The Musical takes as its starting point the original core characters from the first series of Bad Girls on TV, and loosely follows the storyline of the first series, most notably, the suicide of Rachel Hicks and the relationship between Wing Governor Helen Stewart and inmate Nikki Wade.

Following a successful workshop production in November 2004 at the New Players Theatre, London, the musical went on to premiere at the West Yorkshire Playhouse in Leeds in 2006. The subsequent West End production began previews at the Garrick Theatre in August 2007 and officially opened in September 2007. Despite positive reviews, the musical closed less than two months later due to poor ticket sales, with the final performance staged on 17 November 2007.

== Reception ==
=== Viewing figures ===
Title	Series	Episodes	First aired	Last aired	Ratings peak (millions)	Ave. viewers (millions)	Rank
Bad Girls	1	10	1 June 1999	3 August 1999	7.99 (S1E1)	7.29	#15
Bad Girls	2	13	4 April 2000	4 July 2000	9.49 (S2E9)	8.75	#10
Bad Girls	3	16	20 March 2001	3 July 2001	9.42 (S3E1)	8.63	#11
Bad Girls	4	16	28 February 2002	13 June 2002	7.56 (S4E1)	7.05	#14
Bad Girls	5	16	8 May 2003	21 August 2003	8.36 (S5E1)	6.88	#13
Bad Girls	6	12	14 April 2004	23 August 2004	8.25 (S6E2)	7.21	#12
Bad Girls	7	13	10 May 2005	19 December 2005	7.16 (S7E13)	5.60	#15
Bad Girls	8	11	13 July 2006	20 December 2006	5.40 (S8E1)	4.72	#16
Footballers' Wives	1	8	8 January 2002	26 February 2002	6.49 (S1E1)	5.79	#24
Footballers' Wives	2	8	8 January 2003	26 February 2003	7.44 (S2E5)	6.84	#19
Footballers' Wives	3	9	11 February 2004	7 April 2004	7.37 (S3E9)	6.68	#19
Footballers' Wives	4	9	31 March 2005	26 May 2005	6.85 (S4E1)	6.30	#17
Footballers' Wives	5	8	23 February 2006	14 April 2006	4.98 (S5E6)	4.63	#24
Waterloo Road	1	8	9 March 2006	27 April 2006	5.03 (S1E1)	4.60	#23
Waterloo Road	2	12	18 January 2007	26 April 2007	5.09 (S2E10)	4.30	N/A
Waterloo Road	3	20	11 October 2007	13 March 2008	5.47 (S3E20)	5.00	#19
Waterloo Road	4	20	7 January 2009	20 May 2009	4.95 (S4E12)	4.70	N/A
Waterloo Road	5	20	28 October 2009	15 July 2010	5.97 (S5E2)	4.80	N/A
Waterloo Road	6	20	1 September 2010	6 April 2011	5.67 (S6E17)	4.90	#15
Waterloo Road	7	30	4 May 2011	25 April 2012	6.20 (S7E6)	5.10	#14
Waterloo Road	8	30	23 August 2012	4 July 2013	4.75 (S8E20)	4.40	N/A
Waterloo Road	9	20	5 September 2013	12 March 2014	N/A	4.10	N/A
Waterloo Road	10	20	15 October 2014	9 March 2015	N/A	3.60	N/A
Rock Rivals	1	8	5 March 2008	23 April 2008	4.12 (S1E1)	N/A	N/A
Hope Springs	1	8	7 June 2009	26 July 2009	6.25 (S1E1)	3.78	N/A

Note: On average, Bad Girls was Shed Productions' highest rated and most successful production.
Note: As Shed Productions are now defunct as of 2015, the recent revival of Waterloo Road is produced under Wall to Wall Media and Rope Ladder Fiction, therefore the eleventh series will not appear here.

=== Awards and nominations ===
Bad Girls
Year	Association	Category	Recipient(s)	Result
2000	National Television Awards	Most Popular Actress	Debra Stephenson	Nominated
2000	National Television Awards	Most Popular Drama	Bad Girls	Won
2000	TV Quick Awards	Best Loved Drama	Bad Girls	Won
2001	EMMA Awards	TV Actress	Alicya Eyo	Nominated
2001	National Television Awards	Most Popular Actress	Debra Stephenson	Nominated
2001	National Television Awards	Most Popular Drama	Bad Girls	Won
2001	TV Quick Awards	Best Actress	Debra Stephenson	Won
2001	TV Quick Awards	Best Loved Drama	Bad Girls	Won
2002	National Television Awards	Most Popular Drama	Bad Girls	Nominated
2002	TV Quick Awards	Best Actress	Claire King	Won
2002	TV Quick Awards	Best Loved Drama	Bad Girls	Won
2003
2003	Inside Soap Awards	Best Drama	Bad Girls	Won
2003	National Television Awards	Most Popular Drama	Bad Girls	Nominated
2003	TV Quick Awards	Best Actress	Claire King	Won
2003	TV Quick Awards	Best Loved Drama	Bad Girls	Won
2004	National Television Awards	Most Popular Drama	Bad Girls	Nominated
2004	TV Quick Awards	Best Actor	Jack Ellis	Won
2005	Inside Soap Awards	Best Drama	Bad Girls	Won
2005	National Television Awards	Most Popular Drama	Bad Girls	Nominated
2006	National Television Awards	Most Popular Drama	Bad Girls	Nominated
Wins: 12 • Nominations: 20

Footballers' Wives
Year	Association	Category	Recipient(s)	Result
2004	National Television Awards	Most Popular Actress	Zöe Lucker	Nominated
2004	National Television Awards	Most Popular Drama	Footballers' Wives	Nominated
2004	TV Quick Awards	Most Popular Actress	Zöe Lucker	Won
2005	TV Quick Awards	Most Popular Actress	Zöe Lucker	Nominated
2005	TV Quick Awards	Best Loved Drama	Footballers' Wives	Won
Wins: 2 • Nominations: 5

Waterloo Road
Year	Association	Category	Recipient(s)	Result
2006	TV Quick and TV Choice Awards	Best New Drama	Maureen Chadwick	Won
2007	TV Quick and TV Choice Awards	Best Actress	Jill Halfpenny	Won
2007	TV Quick and TV Choice Awards	Best Loved Drama	Waterloo Road	Nominated
2008	Digital Spy Soap Awards	Best Serial Drama	Waterloo Road	Nominated
2008	TV Quick and TV Choice Awards	Best Loved Drama	Waterloo Road	Nominated
2008	TV Quick and TV Choice Awards	Best Actress	Denise Welch	Nominated
2009	TV Quick and TV Choice Awards	Best Family Drama	Waterloo Road	Won
2009	TV Quick and TV Choice Awards	Best Actress	Denise Welch	Won
2009	TV Quick and TV Choice Awards	Best Actor	Neil Morrissey	Nominated
2010	Inside Soap Awards	Best Drama	Waterloo Road	Won
2010	Royal Television Society North West Awards	Best Script Writer	Ann McManus	Won
2010	TV Quick and TV Choice Awards	Best Actress	Denise Welch	Won
2010	TV Quick and TV Choice Awards	Best Family Drama	Waterloo Road	Nominated
2011	16th National Television Awards	Most Popular Drama	Waterloo Road	Won
2011	Inside Soap Awards	Best Drama	Waterloo Road	Won
2011	TV Quick and TV Choice Awards	Best Family Drama	Waterloo Road	Nominated
2011	TV Quick and TV Choice Awards	Best Actress	Amanda Burton	Nominated
2011	British Academy Television Awards	Continuing Drama	Waterloo Road	Nominated
2011	Broadcast Awards	Best Soap or Continuing Drama	Waterloo Road	Nominated
2012	Inside Soap Awards	Best Drama	Waterloo Road	Won
2012	TV Quick and TV Choice Awards	Best Family Drama	Waterloo Road	Nominated
2012	TV Quick and TV Choice Awards	Best Actress	Jaye Jacobs	Nominated
2012	17th National Television Awards	Most Popular Female Drama Performance	Jaye Jacobs	Nominated
2012	17th National Television Awards	Most Popular Drama Series	Waterloo Road	Nominated
2013	Inside Soap Awards	Best Drama	Waterloo Road	Won
2013	TV Quick and TV Choice Awards	Best Drama Series	Waterloo Road	Nominated
2014	Inside Soap Awards	Best Drama	Waterloo Road	Won
2014	TV Quick and TV Choice Awards	Best Drama Series	Waterloo Road	Nominated
2014	TV Quick and TV Choice Awards	Best Actress	Laurie Brett	Nominated
2014	British Academy Scotland Awards	Best Actress - Television	Laurie Brett	Nominated
2015	Inside Soap Awards	Best Drama	Waterloo Road	Nominated
Wins: 12 • Nominations: 31
