= Bombshell (TV series) =

British TV series

- Genre: Military drama
- Written by: Maureen Chadwick; Ann McManus
- Directed by: Jim Loach
- Starring: Zöe Lucker; Andrew McKay; Jeremy Sheffield; Alicya Eyo; Chris Geere; Felix Scott; Robert Beck; Rosie Marcel; Lucy Cohu; Bertie Carvel
- Country of origin: United Kingdom
- Original language: English
- No. of series: 1
- No. of episodes: 7

Production
- Executive producers: Maureen Chadwick; Ann McManus
- Producer: Brian Park
- Production location: United Kingdom
- Running time: 90 minutes (Episode 1); 60 minutes (Episodes 2—7)
- Production companies: Shed Productions; Granada Television

Original release
- Network: TV One
- Release: 2 May – 13 June 2006

Bombshell is a British television military drama series, produced by Shed Productions, the company behind Bad Girls, Footballers' Wives, and Waterloo Road. The series, originally commissioned by Shed Productions in early 2004, focuses on the day-to-day workload of officers and soldiers in the British Army, and was subsequently given the nickname Army Wives by the British press. The series was first teased by the creators in March 2002, and was described as "a focus on how the army is changing with the recruitment of more women and a more lenient attitude to homosexuality." The series was initially offered to the BBC, but the producers were unhappy with the rights deal initially offered by the channel.

The series attracted a strong initial casting, with Zöe Lucker, Bertie Carvel and Rosie Marcel among the first cast members confirmed to star in the series. After filming completed, ITV announced that the series was scheduled to be aired in February 2005. After the series failed to materialise, there was suggestion that the series could launch on ITV2 instead, but this did not happen, and the series has never been officially broadcast in the UK.

An ITV spokesperson claimed that the reason the series was shelved was due to the "undeniable similarities" between the series and Ultimate Force, which at the time, was struggling in the ratings, with two series having been cancelled mid-run due to poor ratings. However, just over a year later, the series was shown on TV One in New Zealand in 2006, and on the Hallmark Channel in Australia in 2008. A DVD of the series was also released on 3 March 2007 in New Zealand.

A spin-off series, entitled Bombshell Bootcamp, which followed the cast as they trained at an Army Boot Camp in Bracknell in preparation for their roles in the series, was also due to air on ITV2.

== Cast ==
- Zöe Lucker — Captain Jenna Marston
- Andrew McKay — Gunner Luke Bates
- Robert Beck — Bombardier Boyd Billington
- Emma Rydal — Cheryl Cotter
- Rosie Marcel — Gunner Stacey Dawes
- Lucy Cohu — Valerie Welling
- Bertie Carvel — Lieutenant Roddy Frost
- Felix Scott — Gunner Adam Hodges
- Jeremy Sheffield — Major Nicholas Welling
- Michael Obiora — Gunner Jackson Clark
- Daisy Dunlop — Gunner Karina Fuller
- Chris Geere — Gunner Dean McGowan
- Alicya Eyo — Gunner Gaynor Harvey
- Simon Sherlock — Lance Bombardier Terry Cotter
- Bob Cryer — Guy Corderey
- Alix Wilton Regan — Sophie Welling

== Episode list ==
No.	Title	Directed by	Written by	Original release date
1	Episode 1	Maureen Chadwick & Ann McManus	Jim Loach	2 May 2006
Kosovo, 2002. On a rescue mission to save a group of civilians trapped in the centre of a civil war, Major Nicholas Welling (Jeremy Sheffield) saves the life of Captain Jenna Marston (Zöe Lucker) after she stumbles into a booby trapped building. Despite losing his left leg, Welling returns to the army, much to the dismay of his increasingly distant wife, Valerie (Lucy Cohu). Fast forward two years, and a team of new recruits are being trained for combat under the watchful eye of Bombardier Boyd Billington (Robert Beck). Billington sends the troops out on a training exercise with the brief of capturing a serial killer who has escaped from a nearby mental unit and taken refuge on MOD land. The exercise goes well, until Gunner Luke Bates, acting as the decoy, goes too far and threatens his colleagues, including traumatised Gunner Karina Fuller, with a knife. As Billington is hauled in by his superiors, Marston encourages the troops to lodge complaints of bullying. Meanwhile, Welling asks his wife for a divorce to allow him to further his relationship with Marston.
2	Episode 2	Paul Mousley	Jim Loach	9 May 2006
A bus containing a group of illegal immigrants (Mehmet Ergen) bound for a deportation flight is ambushed by two armed gunman, and in the ensuing chaos, the entire group escape from custody. The regiment are dispatched to round up the escapees, but Dean (Chris Geere) has other ideas and uses the mission to pressure Karina into revealing her true feelings for him. Meanwhile, Bates (Andrew McKay), Dawes (Rosie Marcel) and Clark (Michael Obiora) encounter the two armed gunman, but despite Dawes' insistence on calling for backup, Bates presses ahead and tries to capture the pair single handed. Disaster ensues, and the pair end up holding up two hostages in a nearby rural petrol station. Billington ends up becoming a third hostage when he ignores orders from Welling and tries to ambush the gunmen. Dean and Karina are forced to make a moral decision when they encounter mother and daughter Silvana and Leylah (Rita Ora), who claim that they were victims of torture back in their home country. Jenna decides to break off her relationship with Welling.
3	Episode 3	Catherine Cooke	Jim Loach	16 May 2006
The regiment's annual review spurs a visit from Brigadier James Atherton, whom Welling is trying to impress in an attempt to secure a promotion. When Atherton singles out Dawes for impressive range accuracy and personal appearance, Billington becomes jealous and orders that the troops undergo an endurance test. On the assault course, Karina decides to end the pregnancy scam by faking a miscarriage. However, in doing so, both she and Dawes manage to fall from a great height. Despite walking away unscathed, Karina is devastated when Dawes is taken to hospital, unable to feel anything from the neck down. Billington feels guilty, and decides to visit his fallen comrade in intensive care, just as the news is being broken to her that she may never walk again. Dawes pleads for Billington to help her to commit suicide, but he flatly refuses. Meanwhile, Welling finally manages to strike up the courage to leave Valerie, but as he begins divorce proceedings, Valerie makes it clear that her number one intention is to take him for everything he owns.
4	Episode 4	Paul Mousley	Martin Hutchings	23 May 2006
A family open day taking place on the barracks attracts a visit from Defence Minister Malcolm Tennant (Jonathan Barlow). Meanwhile, an ex-squaddie, Sean Collins (Nicholas Gleaves), is given exclusive entry to the event, despite not having a pre-paid ticket, on the grounds of being good friends with Bombardier Cotter. Shortly after posing for official photos, Minister Tennant disappears. Gaynor is also thrown into panic when her eldest daughter, Aisha, also disappears during the celebrations. Meanwhile, Welling receives a call from Collins asking him to organise a live broadcast from the officer's mess, during which Minister Tennant will announce a public enquiry to determine a treatment programme for suffers of Gulf War syndrome. Collins warns him that failure to comply with the demand will result in a number of explosive devices that have been placed at various locations on the barracks being detonated. It soon becomes a race against time to find each of the devices, one of which has found its way into the hands of Gaynor's missing daughter.
5	Episode 5	Phil Ford	Martin Hutchings	30 May 2006
As preparations for the finals of the inter-regiment boxing championships get underway, tensions between the troop and a group of natives in a local pub boil over, resulting in a mass brawl. Although the main instigator, Bates refuses to accept responsibility. A local councillor, Guy Corderey, is appalled by the behaviour and uses the situation to further his plan to apply for closure of the barracks. Whilst trying to keep Corderey sweet, Jenna finds herself becoming romantically attracted to him, much to the dismay of Welling. Meanwhile, Welling's wayward daughter, Sophie, returns home from boarding school having been expelled for distributing alcohol on campus. With Sophie unaware of the tensions between her feuding parents, Cheryl takes it upon herself to keep her in check. Jackson asks Karina for help in sneaking his girlfriend Lisa onto the base to cheer him on in the boxing final. After he narrowly succeeds in the final, an after-party at Dean and Karina's house takes an interesting turn when Bates finds a mysterious letter in Dean's wardrobe.
6	Episode 6	Paul Mousley	Julie Edwards	6 June 2006
As the troop prepare for an inter-counties darts match against a group of locals from a nearby village, Dean begins to question whether his proposal to marry Karina was a bad idea. Meanwhile, fuelled by the documents he found in Dean's cupboard, Bates begins to dig for the truth to discover who his comrade really is. Welling apologises to Guy for his actions the night before. Sophie begins an intimate relationship with Billington, despite him being blissfully unaware of her age, or true identity. On the day of the darts match, the team's best player, Jackson, is put on litter picking duty, much to the dismay of his teammates. However, his anger soon turns to intrigue when he catches Welling and Marston in a passionate clinch. As he blows the secret of their relationship wide open, Valerie threats to shop both her scheming husband and Jenna to the brigadier. After trying to make a bass at Dean, Bates sends him a blackmail letter containing a photo of him as a schoolboy. Valerie is informed that Nick has been added to the pinklist and is in line for promotion.
7	Episode 7	Paul Mousley	Julie Edwards	13 June 2006
The day of Dean and Karina's wedding has finally arrived, but Bates isn't prepared to let matters lie. Despite seemingly accepting a pay-off to secure his silence, Bates is determined that the bride should know what she is letting herself in for. Cheryl continues to cause problems for Sophie, informing Valerie of her affair with Billington. Valerie is furious, and demands that Billington is reprimanded. But as her behaviour continues to spiral out of control, Nick realises that he has no choice but to arrange for her to be sectioned. Billington's pattern of self harm threatens to leave him fighting for his life. Bates has an outburst at the wedding reception which leaves the guests flabbergasted, and Dean and Karina's hopes of a happy ending in tatters. Sophie arrives home to find Cheryl having assumed her mum's identity, but little is she prepared for the revelation that she is carrying Billington's baby. Jenna finally agrees to move in with Guy, much to Nick's disgust: and realising that he has lost the love of his life, he decides to take drastic action.
