= Omilana =

Omilana is a Yoruba surname. Notable people with the surname include:

- Keisha Omilana (born 1986), American model and entrepreneur
- Niko Omilana (born 1998), British YouTuber and political candidate
