= Shell Dockley =

- Bad Girls character
- Shell Dockley in Series 1 of Bad Girls
- First appearance: "Them and Us" (#1.1)
- Last appearance: "Series 5, Episode 4"
- Created by: Maureen Chadwick; Ann McManus
- Portrayed by: Debra Stephenson (TV series); Nicole Faraday (stage musical)

In-universe information
- Gender: Female
- Occupation: Chef, cleaner, dancer, 'top dog' of G-Wing at HMP Larkhall (1996–1999)
- Children: Kayley Dockley (daughter); Dena Dockley (daughter); Ronan Beckham Dockley (son)

Michelle "Shell" Dockley is a fictional character from the award-winning prison drama series Bad Girls. She is portrayed by British actress Debra Stephenson. Shell was one of the lead characters in the series. Shell appeared from the first episode in Series 1 until the last episode of Series 3, and returned for the first four episodes of Series 5. Dockley is the most feared inmate of the prison's ‘G Wing’, and commits several crimes, including smuggling drugs into the prison, stabbing prison officer Jim Fenner, and planning for Denny to set Snowball Merriman's hair on fire.

== Personality and characterization ==
Shell Dockley is sentenced to life imprisonment for torturing and murdering a girl named Lisa Simmonds, who had an affair with her boyfriend; she tied the girl up, tortured her and eventually set her on fire. Shell is violent and ruthless, and delights in acts of cruelty and torture; officers and prisoners alike call her a psychopath. She is a drug dealer and pusher, and has no real friends on the wing, except Daniella "Denny" Blood (Alicya Eyo), a relationship that is also sexual. Shell has an affair with corrupt principal officer Jim Fenner (Jack Ellis), a relationship which eventually goes sour in Series 2 after Jim discovered that Shell had telephoned his wife Marilyn (Kim Taylforth) to hear him and Shell having sex. Jim responds by beating up Shell. Jim and Shell's relationship ends for good after she stabs him with a broken bottle in the opening episode of Series 3. In Series 2, Shell states that the judge who sentenced her to life imprisonment had called her "evil personified".

== Storylines ==
=== Series 1 ===
Shell is Top Dog among the prisoners of G-Wing. She is first seen rehearsing for the prison's annual fashion show, which is soon cancelled. She is best friends with Denny, who is also her occasional lover. She is involved in a relationship with married officer Jim Fenner, who is also having an affair with Rachel Hicks (Joanne Froggatt), a young prisoner whom Shell bullied. Eventually, Rachel commits suicide. She gets into a fight with Nikki Wade. When she discovers Zandra Plackett (Lara Cazalet) is blackmailing officer Lorna Rose (Luisa Bradshaw-White), she too begins blackmailing Lorna and forces her to smuggle in drugs for her. Shell also makes an enemy of religious prisoner Crystal Gordon (Sharon Duncan Brewster), but briefly becomes religious, and together she and Crystal report Lorna and get her sacked. Shell soon reverts to her old ways.

Shell is usurped as Top Dog on G Wing by Yvonne Atkins (Linda Henry) by the end of Series 1.

=== Series 2 ===
Shell gets a mobile phone smuggled into Larkhall and calls Fenner's wife, Marilyn, to let her know about the affair. She makes an enemy of Barbara "Babs" Hunt (Isabelle Amyes), and when they get into a fight, Babs pushes Shell resulting in an injury. However, Shell doesn't report her, due to Babs being much older and timid. Shell then fears if the truth about the fight got out, it will damage her "tough girl" image. Shell then begins acting strangely and eventually tells Wing Governor Karen Betts (Claire King) that she was sexually abused by her father as a child. She is vexed when she discovers Karen is now in a relationship with Fenner. When Fenner enters her cell and begins having sex with her, she pulls out a broken glass bottle and stabs him in the stomach with it.

=== Series 3 ===
Karen hears Fenner screaming after Shell stabs him and almost the entire prison staff attempt to save him. However, Shell barricades the door, and makes demands to be brought up to her cell in a swinger. The other prisoners cheer her on as they all hate Fenner. When her cell door is finally broken down, she is eventually restrained. Sylvia Hollamby (Helen Fraser) is furious when Shell is allowed back on G-Wing, so has her transferred to the psychiatric unit of the prison, which the inmates refer to as "the muppet wing". She forces Shell to share a cell with "Mad" Tessa Spall (Helen Schlesinger), a former G-Wing prisoner whom Shell did not get along with. However, Tessa appears to become infatuated by Shell. When Sylvia sees her plan is not working, she tells another mental patient, "Podger" Pam Jolly (Wendi Peters), that Shell has stolen her medication, and then lets Pam into the shower where Shell is. Pam brutally beats up Shell, while a delighted Sylvia looks on. Shell returns to G-Wing and is top dog again and torments Fenner who eventually helps Shell escape. Denny and her girlfriend Shaz Wiley (Lindsey Fawcett) escape with her, however they lose Shaz, who is subsequently caught and returned.

Shell and Denny stay with a pimp in Kings Cross for the night, and the next day wear wigs to conceal their identities. They break into the Hollamby residence, and when Sylvia returns home, they take her hostage and force her to dress as French maid and serve them cocaine on a tray. When her undertaker husband Bobby returns home, they take him hostage too. The pair also take the Hollambys' money and Shell wrecks Sylvia's priceless ornaments. That night, Shell and Denny tie Bobby and Sylvia up, before going to bed together. The next morning, when Shell discovers Bobby has tried to break free, she places him in a coffin in their garage, and forces Sylvia to nail the coffin shut. Shell then begins to pour petrol over the coffin. After tying Sylvia to the garage door, Shell sets the coffin on fire. As the police arrive, Shell and Denny make a run for it in Bobby's hearse. They hide out in former cellmate Crystal's place. Shell overhears Crystal trying to warn Denny about her, so the next morning Shell plants drugs in Crystal's bedroom and calls the police, impersonating a civilian telling them that Crystal helped hide them. They immediately leave and tell Crystal they are going to stay with Shell's auntie Nelly in Scotland - this is lies as they both go to leave for Spain with false passports. Crystal is subsequently arrested and returned to Larkhall. Shell and Denny are not seen again until the last episode of the series, where Shell makes a phone call to Sylvia, impersonating a mattress sales person. She asks Sylvia if her husband would prefer to sleep in a black coffin instead. Sylvia becomes terrified as she realises Shell is on the other end of the phone. The call is traced and Shell and Denny are arrested on a boat, however they make one last escape, and jump into the sea.

=== Hiatus ===
Shell does not appear in Series 4, but is mentioned numerous times. At first, it is reported on the news that neither Shell or Denny were found in the sea, much to Sylvia's delight. But Denny is later re-captured and returned to Larkhall, with news that Shell was last seen speed boating while under the influence of drugs and is presumed dead. Sylvia and Bobby later visit the spot where Shell "died" for closure.

=== Series 5 ===
Shell, it seems, did not actually drown and is discovered in a strip club in Amsterdam by Fenner and other officers on a weekend trip. Shell is captured and reveals that she is pregnant. She plans to finish her sentence in Amsterdam, hoping that she is not extradited back to England. She is set up by her former lover Jeremy Pugh and is forced to return to Larkhall.

Once back in Larkhall, she goes back on the lifers unit and immediately sets up a deal with Fenner, who begins pimping her to the male prison officers. Shell and Denny are also reunited, and plan to get revenge on Snowball Merriman (Nicole Faraday) for killing Shaz. Shell gets Snowball on her side by promising to give her a beauty makeover. After getting Snowball prepared for a makeover, Denny then proceeds to set fire to Snowball's hair.

Shell continues her business with Fenner and soon goes into labour, giving birth to a baby boy who she names Ronan Beckham Dockley. Prison officer Colin Hedges (Tristan Sturrock) later comes into Shell's cell and tries to coerce Shell into having sex with him, but Shell refuses to do so in front of her child. Fenner hears the shouting and enters the cell to find Colin there. A nurse enters the room and Fenner, not wanting his secret with Shell and the other officers exposed, lies and tells the nurse that Shell tried to smother her baby. Shell is later removed from the prison and sent to a psychiatric hospital. Ronan is then taken into care.

== Bad Girls: The Musical ==
The character of Shell Dockley also appeared in Bad Girls: The Musical, a musical adaptation based on the television series. In this version she was portrayed by Nicole Faraday, who in the TV series portrayed Snowball Merriman, one of Shell's enemies.

== Reception ==
Shell was voted number 2 in the top ten Bad Girls special, Bad Girls: Most Wanted, which was hosted by Jack Ellis. She was voted number 8 in Virgin Media's "Top 10 TV Criminals".
