= Keisha Omilana =

American model and Yoruba princess

Oloori Keisha Omilana of Ipetu-Ijesha
- Born: Keisha Bolden; March 8, 1986 (age 40); Inglewood, California, U.S.
- Occupations: Model; Media Executive; Entrepreneur
- Spouse: Omoba Adekunle Adebayo Omilana (m. 2006)
- Children: 2
- Modeling information
- Hair color: Brown
- Eye color: Brown

Oloori Keisha Omilana of Ipetu-Ijesha (born Keisha Bolden; March 8, 1986), commonly known as Princess Keisha Omilana, is an American model and entrepreneur. She is the owner of SAXS Magazine.

She was the first African-American to be featured in three consecutive commercials for Pantene, and later became the face of an international advertisement campaign for the company. Omilana has also modeled in campaigns for the French luxury brand L'Oréal, the British clothing brand Boden, and the American CoverGirl, Maybelline, and Revlon.

As the wife of Omoba Adekunle Adebayo Omilana of Ipetu-Ijesha, she is an Oloori (or princess consort) of the Yoruba House of Arigbabuowo in Nigeria. She and her family were the focus of an episode of the second season of the British reality television series Stacey Dooley Sleeps Over in 2021.

== Early life and education ==
Omilana was born and raised in Inglewood, California. She studied fashion at a school in Chicago.

== Career ==
Omilana moved to New York City to work as a model. She worked with L'Oreal, Maybelline, Boden, Revlon, CoverGirl, and Pantene. She was cast in three consecutive commercials for Pantene, becoming the first African-American woman to do so. Omilana was also featured in an international advertisement campaign for the company. She has walked in New York Fashion Week.

In 2010, she and Sarah Bradford were dressed by Maggie Norris as part of her co-presentation exhibition An Evening of New York Couture, in collaboration with Verdura and Aman & Carson Interiors.

After moving to London, she continued to model and was featured, along with her daughter, in an editorial for Mocha Magazine.

In 2017, Omilana launched A Crown of Curls, a hair care business geared towards families with mixed-race children.

In 2021, Omilana and her family were featured in the second season of Stacey Dooley's reality television series Stacey Dooley Sleeps Over, as the focus of the second episode of the season. In 2023, she founded SAXS Magazine, an online publication that focuses on royalty, fashion and entertainment.

== Personal life ==
In 2004, while living in New York City, she met Omoba Adekunle Adebayo Omilana, a member of the Arigbabuowo ruling house of Ipetu-Ijesa (a former Yoruba kingdom in Nigeria), outside of The W. They married on January 28, 2006. She wasn't aware that her husband was a prince until after they were engaged. They have two children, Omoba Adediran King Omilana and Omoba Adediora Isabella Nicole Omilana, and have lived in New York City, Cyprus, Dubai, and London. They currently reside in Valencia, Spain. Her stepson, from her husband's previous marriage, is the YouTuber Niko Omilana.

In 2023, Omilana served on a panel organised by Business Insider to talk about diversity and inclusion, racial representation, African royalty, and the role of monarchy in the modern day. She also talked about the Duchess of Sussex stepping down from royal duties. She compared her own situation to that of Prince Harry, Duke of Sussex and Meghan, Duchess of Sussex.

In August 2024, Omilana and her husband attended the wedding ceremonies of Princess Martha Louise of Norway and Durek Verrett in Norway.
