= Hope Springs (TV series) =

British comedy-drama television series

- Genre: Comedy drama
- Created by: Ann McManus; Maureen Chadwick; Liz Lake
- Written by: Ann McManus; Maureen Chadwick; Liz Lake
- Directed by: Sheree Folkson; Dermot Boyd
- Starring: Alex Kingston; Siân Reeves; Christine Bottomley; Vinette Robinson; Annette Crosbie; Ronni Ancona; Paul Higgins; Alec Newman; Lorraine McIntosh; Richard Madden; Tony McGeever; Mark Frost; Clint Dyer; Nicola Roy
- Composers: Tristin Norwell and Nick Green
- Country of origin: United Kingdom
- Original language: English
- No. of series: 1
- No. of episodes: 8

Production
- Executive producer: Brian Park
- Producers: Spencer Campbell; Brian Park
- Production companies: Shed Productions; BBC Scotland

Original release
- Network: BBC One; BBC HD
- Release: 7 June – 26 July 2009

Hope Springs is a British television comedy-drama series following the lives of four female ex-cons in hiding following a multimillion-pound robbery. Produced by Shed Productions, the company behind Bad Girls, Footballers' Wives, and Waterloo Road, the 8-part series began airing on BBC One on 7 June 2009 and finished on 26 July 2009. After a single series, the BBC cancelled Hope Springs, because it "did not find its audience in the way that [they] had hoped."

== Filming ==
Production on the series began in summer 2008 in the village of Wanlockhead, situated in the Dumfries and Galloway region, a location chosen for its scenery to provide the backdrop for the programme. The interior scenes to be featured have been shot at the BBC Scotland drama studios in Dumbarton.

== Cast ==
Character	Actor	Reference
Ellie Lagden	Alex Kingston	
Hannah Temple	Siân Reeves	
Shoo Coggan	Christine Bottomley	
Josie Porritt	Vinette Robinson	
Sadie Cairncross	Annette Crosbie	
Ann Marie Cairncross	Ronni Ancona	
Gil Cameron	Paul Higgins	
Euan Harries	Alec Newman	
Ina Harries	Lorraine McIntosh	
Dean McKenzie	Richard Madden	
Ronan Harries	Tony McGeever	
Roy Lagden	Mark Frost	
Marius Gruber	Clint Dyer	
Nathan Donovan	Oliver Gomm	
Rita Khan	Belgit Gill	
Mo Khan	Sanjeev Kohli	
David Allan	Gregg Munroe	
Chris O'Neill	Ashley Rice	

== Plot ==
The 8-part first series is set around the lives of Ellie Langden (Alex Kingston), Hannah Temple (Siân Reeves), Shoo Coggan (Christine Bottomley) and Josie Porritt (Vinette Robinson) – four sexy female ex-cons attempting to go straight. With the help of £3 million, stolen from Ellie's rich gangster husband Roy (Mark Frost), they plan to head out to the sunny safety of Barbados to begin their new lives. However, when their long-thought-out plan goes wrong, they find themselves staying in the remote Scottish village of Hope Springs – a village set to change each of their lives forever.

The series ended with the text:

The Gang of Five remain on the run. Being millionaires and a great tan helps them cope.

== Episodes ==
#	Episode	Writer	Director	Original airdate
1	Episode One	Ann McManus, Maureen Chadwick & Liz Lake	Sheree Folkson	7 June 2009
When the girls' long-held plan to start a new life in Barbados – courtesy of £3million stolen from Ellie's gangster husband Roy – goes awry, they head north for Scotland. Their escape plans in tatters and Roy's vengeful hitman, Marius, hot on their tails, the girls stumble across what seems like the perfect hideaway – a ramshackle hotel in a remote Scottish village called Hope Springs.
2	Episode Two	Ann McManus, Maureen Chadwick & Liz Lake	Sheree Folkson	14 June 2009
Their millions burnt to a cinder following the mysterious fire, Ellie, Hannah, Shoo and Josie face the harsh reality that their Barbados dream is all but over. Broke and desperate, it seems that their only option is to rob Sadie of the £200,000 they paid for the hotel but, feeling decidedly unwelcome, Sadie has set her sights on buying a luxury new flat. The girls need to stop her before she discovers her money's missing. Elsewhere, Ann Marie and Euan meet to discuss a secret venture but it is clear there's more to their relationship than just business.
3	Episode Three	Ann McManus, Maureen Chadwick & Liz Lake	Ian Barnes	21 June 2009
Back with her friends in Hope Springs, Shoo puts all thoughts of her ex-boyfriend out of her mind, focusing her attentions on new beau Dean. However, trouble comes calling when a jealous Ronan snaps after seeing Shoo kiss Dean. A fight erupts between the feuding local lads until an enraged Josie breaks it up.
4	Episode Four	Ann McManus, Maureen Chadwick & Liz Lake	Ian Barnes	28 June 2009
The news of Nathan's murder strikes fear into the hearts of Ellie, Hannah, Shoo and Josie. Believing the net is tightening in on them, the girls decide to leave Hope Springs, but with no money or passports they must resort to stealing other people's identities. As they all prepare to make their long-awaited getaway, doubts arise, and then events take a dramatic turn after Sadie makes a startling discovery, forcing them to take drastic action.
5	Episode Five	Ann McManus, Maureen Chadwick & Liz Lake	Dermot Boyd	5 July 2009
It's the day of Ann Marie and Gil's wedding but mother-of-the-bride, Sadie, will miss the celebrations – she's a prisoner in her bedroom having discovered that Ellie, Hannah, Shoo and Josie are ex-cons on the run. Convinced they might have dubious plans for her, Sadie decides to escape, but she soon becomes the least of the girls' concerns as an uninvited guest, hitman Marius, turns up at the Hope Springs Hotel, bringing along his gun for company.
6	Episode Six	Ann McManus, Maureen Chadwick & Liz Lake	Dermot Boyd	12 July 2009
With bits of Marius’ car washing up at the lochside, the women are under pressure to get out of Hope Springs, fast. Sadie's dodgy Lithuanian contact is happy to supply them all with fake passports, but at a price. Having run out of cash, Ellie tempts Bronius with a game of poker in the hope they can win their passports and make some money. Their situation becomes even more desperate when the police start to drag the loch. It's only a matter of time before they discover Marius' remains.
7	Episode Seven	Ann McManus, Maureen Chadwick & Liz Lake	Brian Kelly	19 July 2009
As the new owner of the Hope Springs Hotel, Ann Marie wants a quick sale to fund her dream move to Edinburgh. But when she decides to sell-up to a pair of flash city boys, the women hatch elaborate plans to put them off. Meanwhile, at the lochside, Ronan assists Gil with the police search to find Billy's body but, frustratingly, his scant information proves unhelpful. Just as hope begins to fade, Gil receives good news – a submerged car has been found in the loch with a severed arm in the boot.
8	Episode Eight	Ann McManus, Maureen Chadwick & Liz Lake	Brian Kelly	26 July 2009
Secrets and lies are revealed as Ellie and the others are forced to face up to their criminal past. Having discovered the dead body is hit man Marius, policeman Gil questions the shamed women – he wants the truth. Ellie makes the shocking confession that they're ex-convicts on the run from her vengeful husband, Roy. Meanwhile, in prison Roy strikes a deal with the police for a quick release and heads straight for Hope Springs, determined to take revenge on his double-crossing wife and her friends.

== Ratings ==
#	Air date	BBC One	
#	Air date	Viewers (millions)	Audience share
1	7 June 2009	6.25	25.8%
2	14 June 2009	4.40	20.3%
3	21 June 2009	3.19	13.8%
4	28 June 2009	3.07	13.4%
5	5 July 2009	3.65	14.9%
6	12 July 2009	3.29	14.3%
7	19 July 2009	3.71	14%
8	26 July 2009	4.01	15.9%
Average		3.78	16.6%

== DVD release ==
The 3-disc DVD box set of Hope Springs was released in the UK on 27 July 2009, distributed by Acorn Media UK.
