= Hot Summer Nights (film) =

2017 American drama film by Elijah Bynum

- Theatrical release poster
- Directed by: Elijah Bynum
- Written by: Elijah Bynum
- Produced by: Bradley Thomas; Dan Friedkin; Ryan Friedkin
- Starring: Timothée Chalamet; Maika Monroe; Alex Roe; Maia Mitchell; William Fichtner; Thomas Jane; Emory Cohen
- Narrated by: Shane Epstein Petrullo
- Cinematography: Javier Julia
- Edited by: Jeffrey J. Castelluccio; Dan Zimmerman; Tom Costantino
- Music by: Will Bates
- Production company: Imperative Entertainment
- Distributed by: A24; DirecTV Cinema
- Release dates: March 13, 2017 (SXSW); July 27, 2018 (United States)
- Running time: 107 minutes
- Country: United States
- Language: English
- Box office: $246,133

Hot Summer Nights is a 2017 American neo-noir coming-of-age crime drama film written and directed by Elijah Bynum, in his directorial debut. It stars Timothée Chalamet, Maika Monroe, Alex Roe, Maia Mitchell, William Fichtner, Thomas Jane, and Emory Cohen. Set on Cape Cod in the summer of 1991, the plot follows Daniel Middleton, a teenage boy who becomes entangled in the drug trade.

The film premiered at South by Southwest on March 13, 2017. It was released on June 28, 2018, through DirecTV Cinema, before beginning a theatrical limited release on July 27, 2018, by A24.

== Plot ==
In 1991, Daniel, an awkward teenager, is sent by his mother to spend the summer with his aunt on Cape Cod after the death of his father. He is not excited about it at first, but soon he meets Hunter Strawberry, the bad boy in town. While working at a convenience store, Hunter hurriedly asks Daniel to hide marijuana from approaching police. They later become business partners in selling drugs from a man named Dex. He provides Daniel and Hunter with the marijuana they need to facilitate their business but warns them about the fatal consequences if he gets crossed.

Hunter's younger sister McKayla is the most crushed-on girl in Cape Cod. After escaping from her boyfriend at the drive-in, McKayla asks Daniel to take her home. Although Hunter forbids him from seeing McKayla, Daniel cannot help himself. At the summer carnival, he kisses her, resulting in a beating by McKayla's boyfriend and his friends. Daniel and McKayla soon start dating secretly. At the same time, Hunter develops a relationship with Amy, the daughter of Sergeant Frank Calhoun, who becomes suspicious about his daughter's whereabouts.

Selling marijuana becomes very profitable, and Daniel and Hunter start to make a lot of money. Their success and rising tensions within their lives intertwine with the impending Hurricane Bob, soon to reach Cape Cod. Daniel wants to start selling cocaine without letting Dex know, but Dex finds out and wants Hunter to kill Daniel. Hunter tells Daniel to run and never come back, and when Dex finds Hunter, he kills him. Daniel speeds through the storm to McKayla's house, but she has left to reconcile with Hunter. McKayla finds her brother's body, just minutes after his murder, then flees town. According to the narrator, Daniel and McKayla are never seen again. Daniel Middleton knew his time in this town had finally come to an end and he knew if he loved the girl, the best thing was to leave her be. Some say he ended up in Wyoming or Nevada. In some forgotten little town on the edge of the desert. Others will tell you he's in a big city somewhere, lost in the crowds. But he was never seen again. As for McKayla, she left town, killed the dreams of every boy whoever knew who she was. She was last seen in a diner outside Peoria, Illinois, and headed west.

== Cast ==
- Timothée Chalamet as Daniel
- Maika Monroe as McKayla
- Alex Roe as Hunter
- Maia Mitchell as Amy
- William Fichtner as Shep
- Thomas Jane as Sergeant Calhoun
- Emory Cohen as Dex

== Production ==
On March 26, 2015, it was announced that Elijah Bynum would make his directorial debut with his own 2013 Black List script, Hot Summer Nights, set in 1991 Cape Cod. Imperative Entertainment would finance and produce the film with its Bradley Thomas and Dan Friedkin. On June 24, 2015, Maika Monroe, Timothée Chalamet, and Alex Roe were cast in the lead roles. Later, Maia Mitchell, Emory Cohen and Thomas Jane were also added to the cast. Filming began in August 2015 in Atlanta, Georgia, subbing in as Cape Cod.

== Release ==
Hot Summer Nights premiered at South by Southwest on March 13, 2017. In September 2017, A24 and DirecTV Cinema acquired distribution rights to the film. It was released through DirecTV Cinema on June 28, 2018, before receiving a theatrical limited release by A24 on July 27, 2018.

== Reception ==
On the review aggregator website Rotten Tomatoes, 46% of 41 critics' reviews are positive, with an average rating of 5.2/10. The website's consensus reads: "Hot Summer Nights is easy on the eyes and clearly indebted to some great films, but its strengths – including a charismatic young cast – are often outweighed by its uninspired story." Metacritic, which uses a weighted average, assigned the film a score of 44 out of 100, based on 18 critics, indicating "mixed or average" reviews.

Michael Roffman, writing for Consequence of Sound, praised the film, calling it "A brazen anti-coming-of-age thriller that oozes with all the right confidence, chutzpah, and passion." Peter Travers of Rolling Stone magazine gave the film 2.5 out of 5, and wrote, "The result is chaotic, but never lacking in energy – and the cast is up for anything."

IndieWire critic David Ehrlich criticized the script as "empty", and referred to the film as "A sweaty pastiche that shares its protagonist's desire to be all things to all people, only to wind up losing any sense of itself along the way." Emily Yoshida of Vulture was critical of the reliance on nostalgia and muddled storytelling, and wrote, "As it cliff dives, unprompted, into reheated cocaine-nightmare territory done better by any number of 1990s '70s nostalgia films before it, it not only ceases to be fun, but stops pretending it has any vision for where its lead characters should go."
