= Dianne Pilkington =

English theatre actress and singer

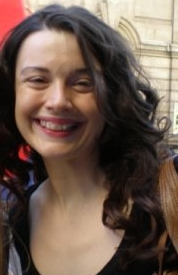
- Born: Dianne Lesley Pilkington; 7 June 1975 (age 51); Wigan, Greater Manchester, UK
- Education: Guildford School of Acting
- Occupations: Actress; singer
- Years active: 1997–present
- Website: diannepilkington.co.uk

Dianne Lesley Pilkington (born 7 June 1975) is an English theatre actress and singer.

== Personal life ==
Pilkington was born in Wigan. She trained at the Guildford School of Acting, graduating in 1997 with the Principal's Award.

Pilkington married Claude Pelletier, on 10 October 2010. Pilkington gave birth to their son, Hugo, on 26 December 2012.

The couple later divorced, and Pilkington married actor Neil Roberts in September 2020.

== Theatre ==
Pilkington's career began in 1997 when she joined the West End production of Les Misérables, Pilkington understudied the role of Fantine whilst in the production. Following Les Misérables, Pilkington starred in the production of Tess, going on tour with the show prior to it appearing at the Savoy, she played the role of Marion. The production ran for 10 weeks in the West End before closing on 8 January 2000.

Pilkington joined the cast of Sweeney Todd at the Bridewell Theatre later in 2000, a production she had played the role of Mrs Lovett in whilst training at GSA.

In late 2000 Pilkington was part of the original London cast of Andrew Lloyd Webber's The Beautiful Game. She played the role of the Protestant girl as well as understudying the role of Bernadette.

In 2002 Pilkington originated the role of Kim in Boy George's musical Taboo. She appeared alongside Boy George at the Royal Albert Hall alongside other members of the original London cast.

It was in late 2002 that Pilkington joined the UK touring production of Beauty and the Beast playing Belle. She remained with the production into 2003.

Again in 2003 Pilkington originated another role in the West End, this time in the Rod Stewart musical Tonight's the Night, as Mary at the Victoria Palace Theatre.

In 2005 Pilkington starred in The Far Pavilions in the role of Belinda. Following this Pilkington again went on tour in the role of Grizabella in Andrew Lloyd Webber's Cats. After leaving the Cats tour in early 2007, Pilkington joined the West End production of Wicked at the Apollo Victoria Theatre. She replaced Helen Dallimore as Glinda on 16 July 2007, after serving as the standby from April of that year. After three years in the company, she played her final performance on 27 March 2010 and was succeeded by Louise Dearman.

Immediately after leaving Wicked, Pilkington played the parts of Annabella Schmidt, Pamela, and Margaret in the West End production of The 39 Steps. She replaced Natalie Walter on 26 April 2010. She ended her nine-month run on 29 January 2011 and was succeeded by Laura Rogers.

After leaving The 39 Steps Pilkington took part in a season of cabarets at Lauderdale House on 20 February 2011, performing tracks from her album. Her guests at the cabaret included Jean-Claude Pelletier, Shimi Goodman & television actress Nicole Faraday. She was accompanied on piano by Christopher Hamilton.

In the Chichester Festival 2011 Pilkington played the role of Amalia in She Loves Me, from 9 May 2011 until 18 June 2011, at the Minerva Theatre.

She starred as Sophie De Palma in the West End production of Master Class, which ran at the Vaudeville Theatre from January – April 2012.

It was announced in April 2013 that Pilkington would take over the role Donna Sheridan in Mamma Mia! at the Novello Theatre beginning 10 June 2013. After playing Donna for three years, Pilkington departed the show on 11 June 2016 and was replaced by Linzi Hateley. The following year, she played Aunt Lily in the musical Whisper House at The Other Palace. Pilkington portrayed Elizabeth Benning in the London production of Young Frankenstein, which premiered at Theatre Royal, Newcastle in August 2017 and then transferred the following month to the Garrick Theatre. Pilkington created the role of Raquel in the musical of Only Fools And Horses, written by Jim Sullivan and Paul Whitehouse. She performed the role from February 2019 to February 2020 at the Haymarket Theatre, London. In June 2021, it was announced that Pilkington would be creating the role of Eglantine Price in the new Bedknobs and Broomsticks adaptation, a collaboration between Disney and Michael Harrison, directed by Candace Edmunds and Jamie Harrison, written by Neil Bartram and Brian Hill. The tour completed in May 2022. In October 2022, the musical adaptation of Saving Grace was announced for a limited twelve performances at Riverside Studios from 22 November until 4 December 2022 as an "intimate first run" in which Pilkington played the role of Grace. Pilkington played the Wicked Witch of the West in the 2023 West End revival of The Wizard of Oz at the London Palladium, which finished its run on 3 September 2023. In 2025, Pilkington starred as Dr. Westfeldt in Dracula, A Comedy of Terrors at Menier Chocolate Factory.

== Film ==
Pilkington was due to play the role of a Blind Opera Singer in 2010's The Wolfman, opposite Benicio del Toro, but her scene had been cut from the final version of the film. However, the scene was included in the Director's Cut DVD version.

In July 2012 it was announced that Pilkington would appear in the new Les Misérables movie, directed by Tom Hooper. Pilkington was credited as Inn Whore 1 appearing in the Master of the House scene opposite Helena Bonham Carter and Sacha Baron Cohen. Her former Wicked co-star Kerry Ellis appears in the same scene.

== Television ==
Pilkington's television credits include appearing on the West End edition of The Weakest Link, which aired 31 December 2008. Pilkington came in a respectable 4th place. She also appeared on Britain's Got Talent giving a brief tour of Wicked, on This Morning performing Popular with Alexia Khadime and on The Alan Titchmarsh Show discussing reality TV shows such as Over The Rainbow.

During the pandemic of 2020-21, Pilkington filmed ‘Innocent’ for ITV, playing Alison Walker, and had a guest role in Holby City, playing Shelley Wilder.

== Video games ==
In addition to her extensive stage career, Pilkington has also worked as a voice actor in video games, portraying Ellie in the 2026 action-adventure title Luna Abyss.

== Awards ==
Pilkington was nominated in the "Best Takeover Role" category for her role in Wicked at the 2008 Theatregoer's Choice Awards, but lost to co-star Kerry Ellis. She and Alexia Khadime won the "Art and Culture Woman of the Future" category at the 2009 Women of the Future Awards. Pilkington also won the Broadwayworld.com UK Award for Best Lead Actress in a Play for The 39 Steps.

== Theatre credits ==
Year	Show	Role(s)	Venue(s)
1997–98	Les Misérables	Ensemble / Understudy Fantine & Cosette	Palace Theatre
1999	Tess	Marion Dewy	Savoy Theatre
2000	Sweeney Todd	Beggar Woman	Bridewell Theatre
2000–01	The Beautiful Game	Protestant Girl	Cambridge Theatre
2002	Taboo	Kim	The Venue Leicester Square
2002–03	Beauty and the Beast	Belle	UK National Tour
2003–04	Tonight's the Night	Mary	Victoria Palace Theatre
2004–05	Snow White and the Seven Dwarfs	Snow White	Victoria Palace Theatre
2005	The Far Pavilions	Belinda	Shaftesbury Theatre
2006–07	Cats	Grizabella	UK National Tour
2007–10	Wicked	Glinda	Apollo Victoria Theatre
2010–11	The 39 Steps	Annabella Schmidt/Pamela/Margaret	Criterion Theatre
2011	She Loves Me	Amalia	Chichester Festival Theatre
2012	Master Class	Sophie De Palma	Vaudeville Theatre
2013–16	Mamma Mia!	Donna Sheridan	Novello Theatre
2017	Whisper House	Aunt Lily	The Other Palace
2017–18	Young Frankenstein	Elizabeth Benning	Newcastle Theatre Royal & Garrick Theatre
2019	Only Fools and Horses The Musical	Raquel	Theatre Royal Haymarket
2020	Cinderella in Concert	Marie/Fairy Godmother	Cadogan Hall
2021	Bedknobs and Broomsticks	Eglantine Price	UK National Tour
2022	Saving Grace	Grace	Riverside Studios
2023	The Wizard of Oz	Wicked Witch of the West / Miss Gulch	London Palladium
2025	Dracula, A Comedy of Terrors	Dr. Westfeldt	Menier Chocolate Factory

== Discography ==
Year	Song(s)	Album
2002	"Love Is A Question Mark", "Pretty Lies", "Independent Woman"	Taboo
2003	"Reason To Believe"	Tonight's The Night
2007	"God's Own Country"	The Beautiful Game
2008	"I Only Wish For You"	"Act One – Songs From the Musicals of Alexander S. Bermange"
2010	"Stuck On You"	"Bush Tales" by Matthew R Jameson
2010	see details below	Little Stories
2011	"Trusting You"	with Shimi Goodman on his debut album "When You Hear My Voice"
2012	"She's My Sister"	The In-Between: A New Musical
2017	"Please Don’t Touch Me"	"Young Frankenstein London Cast"
2018	"The Girl"	"Only Fools And Horses Original Cast Recording"

== Album ==
Pilkington's début solo album, entitled Little Stories, was released in December 2010.

Little Stories: Track listing
No.	Title	Music	Length
1.	"Meadowlark" (From The Baker's Wife)	Stephen Schwartz	5:32
2.	"Someone Else's Story" (from the musical Chess)	Benny Andersson, Tim Rice, Björn Ulvaeus	3:36
3.	"Burn (*)"	Christopher Hamilton, Tennessee Williams	3:43
4.	"Remember (*)"	Christopher Hamilton	3:26
5.	"As Good As New (*)" (Melody Towers)	Christopher Hamilton, Susannah Pearse	2:31
6.	"Somebody's Wife (*)" (from Over The Threshold)	Christopher Hamilton	3:18
7.	"The Man That Got Away" (From A Star Is Born)	Harold Arlen, Ira Gershwin	5:29
8.	"It's Never Easy / I've Been Here Before" (From Closer Than Ever Feat. Nicole Faraday)	Richard Maltby, Jr., David Shire	5:39
9.	"Memory" (From Cats)	Andrew Lloyd Webber	4:30
10.	"Quando M'en Vo" (From La Bohème)	Giacomo Puccini	2:31
11.	"Ev'ry Time We Say Goodbye" (Feat. Mark Goldthorp)	Cole Porter	4:18

(*) Previously Unrecorded

All songs performed by Dianne Pilkington and Accompanied on the Piano by Chris Hamilton.
