= Nicole Faraday =

German-born British actress

- Born: Nicola Morris; 28 July 1976 (age 50); Wegberg, West Germany
- Education: Guildford School of Acting
- Occupations: Actress; Singer
- Years active: 1999–present
- Website: http://www.nicolefaraday.co.uk

Nicole Faraday (born 28 July 1976), is a TMA Award-winning actress, best known for her leading roles on British television series Bad Girls, Casualty and Emmerdale.

== Early life ==
Nicole Faraday was born as Nicola Morris in Wegberg, West Germany, on 28 July 1976 to British parents. Her father, a consultant doctor, was a medical officer in the Royal Air Force working at the RAF Hospital Wegberg, a British base in Germany at the time of her birth. The family later moved back to her mother's home town of Swanage in Dorset. Nicole attended Talbot Heath School in Bournemouth, Clayesmore School in Blandford Forum, Dorset, and went on to train in musical theatre at the Guildford School of Acting.

== Acting roles ==
In 2001, she played a prostitute in the last episode of 'Orrible, alongside Johnny Vaughan and Ricky Grover. From 2002 to 2003, Faraday was a principal cast member of both ITV's Bad Girls and the BBC's Casualty. Faraday's television credits include recurring character Veronica in Emmerdale, The Bill, ITV's Kingdom and Doctors for the BBC. She also stars opposite Vinnie Jones, as his wife, Kim Brookes, in the 2016 vigilante thriller Kill Kane. More recently, she filmed the leading role Ms Bushnell in black comedy Ask The Cheat opposite Martin Trenaman and Nick Moran, released in cinemas in 2019.

=== Bad Girls ===
In Bad Girls, she played prison inmate Snowball Merriman in series 4 and 5 of the TV series; and she played a different character, Shell Dockley, in the West End stage musical version at London's Garrick Theatre. She won a Theatre Managers Association award and was a WOS nominee for the role. Shell Dockley was played (as a non-musical part) in series 1, 2, 3 and 5 of the TV series by Debra Stephenson. Faraday and Stephenson bear a strong physical resemblance, and their characters in Bad Girls were similarly styled. The script for Bad Girls acknowledged this; when the character of Shell returned to the TV series for several episodes in series 5 (after being recaptured having escaped from prison and spending some time on the run in Europe), Shell offers up a comment on Snowball: "Cheeky slag! Swanning about, nicking my look. Who does she think she is? Me?!"

=== Theatre ===
In October 2006, Faraday won a prestigious TMA Award for Best Supporting Performance in a Musical for her portrayal of Shell Dockley in the Bad Girls musical's original run at the West Yorkshire Playhouse. She was subsequently nominated for Best Supporting Actress in a Musical at the West End Whatsonstage.com Awards 2007/8. Other notable theatre credits include An Audience with the Mafia at the Apollo Theatre, and the role of Eva Cassidy in three UK national tours of Over the Rainbow.

Nicole appeared as the Wicked Queen in the pantomime Snow White and the Seven Dwarfs at Eastbourne's Devonshire Park Theatre, from 12 December 2008 to 11 January 2009, alongside Stefan Booth and Niamh Perry from BBC's I'd Do Anything. She repeated this role at The Place theatre, Oakengates in Telford, in the pantomime Snow White, from 8 December 2015 to 3 January 2016, alongside Jeremy Edwards and Amy Reader. She sang solo with Frank Renton's Concert Brass on 10 December 2009 and again in December 2012 at the Royal Albert Hall at a charity Concert with the Stars for TV Times in aid of Leukaemia Research. She regularly performs her own cabaret at venues, such as Pizza on the Park, now known as The Pheasantry.

She has twice appeared as a guest star in best friend Dianne Pilkington's cabarets at Lauderdale House in 2005 and 20 February 2011, singing 'Who Will Love Me As I Am' and 'It's Never That Easy/I've Been Here Before' respectively. She sings this duet on Dianne's debut album Little Stories. She can also be heard on the West End cast album of Bad Girls: The Musical. In 2017, she also featured in the Snow White and the Seven Dwarfs Pantomime at the Palace Theatre.

== Credits ==
=== Film & TV ===
Television
| Year | Title | Role | Notes |
|---|---|---|---|
| 1999 | Agony | Debbie | 1 episode |
| 2000 | Empty Mirror | Lauren Simpson | Feature film |
| 2001 | tvSSFBM EHKL | Lotte | TV film |
| 2001 | 'Orrible | Patrice | 1 episode |
| 2002 | Time Gentlemen Please | Sally | 1 episode |
| 2002 | Casualty | Heather Lincoln | 10 episodes |
| 2002–2003 | Bad Girls | Snowball Merriman | 14 episodes |
| 2003 | Loose Women | Herself | 1 episode |
| 2004 | Bad Girls: Most Wanted | Herself; Snowball Merriman; Shell Dockley | TV programme |
| 2005 | Cathedral | Marjorie | Educational TV mini-series |
| 2008 | The End of Fast Rewind | Lola | Short film |
| 2008 | The Bill | Julie Seaton | 1 episode |
| 2008 | Grandma's Funeral | | Short film |
| 2009 | Bad Girls: The Musical | Shell Dockley | DVD release |
| 2009 | Doctors | Samantha Ashdown | 1 episode |
| 2009 | Kingdom | Joannie | 1 episode |
| 2010 | Last Tango in Croydon | | Short film |
| 2013 | Emmerdale | Veronica | 6 episodes |
| 2013 | Top Dog | Dawn | Feature film |
| 2014 | Rudie Can't Fail | Keli | Short film |
| 2015 | 8ish | Lucy | Short film |
| 2016 | Kill Kane | Kim Brookes | Feature film |

=== Theatre Credits ===
| Year | Title | Role | Theatre | Location |
|---|---|---|---|---|
| 2006–07 | Bad Girls: The Musical | Shell Dockley | Garrick Theatre | West End |
| 2008 | An Audience with the Mafia | Eva | Apollo Theatre | West End |
| 2008–09 | Snow White | Wicked Queen | Devonshire Park Theatre | Eastbourne |
| 2015 | Snow White | Wicked Queen | Place Theatre | Telford |

== Personal life ==
Faraday is openly bisexual. Prior to joining Bad Girls in 2002, she had only been in romantic relationships with men, although she had long known that she was also attracted to women.
