= Laura Rogers =

British actress

Laura Rogers (born 10 March 1979) is a British actress from Carmarthen, Wales.

== Biography ==
Born in Carmarthen, Rogers grew up in nearby Swansea. As a youngster, Rogers was a member of the West Glamorgan Youth Theatre Company and Upland Arts, the Swansea Gilbert and Sullivan society. She studied at the Royal Academy of Dramatic Art (RADA) in London, graduating in 2000.

== Acting roles ==
Rogers's highest-profile roles to date have been single mother and former drug addict Sheena Williams in Series 7 of the ITV drama Bad Girls (2005) and Chastity Green in the BAFTA-nominated BBC mini-series The Sins (2000).

On stage, from December 2003 to January 2004, Rogers appeared in Revelations at London's Hampstead Theatre. From April to May 2004, she performed as Mary Yellan in Jamaica Inn at the Salisbury Playhouse. She then appeared in a production of Celestina, which started at the Birmingham Repertory Theatre, moved to the King's Theatre as part of the Edinburgh International Festival, and then returned to Birmingham. In February 2006, she performed as Rosine in the Bristol Old Vic production of The Barber of Seville. Later that year, she returned to the Old Vic as Milady de Winter in Ken Ludwig's adaptation of The Three Musketeers.

Also in 2006, Rogers originated the role of Wing Governor Helen Stewart in Bad Girls: The Musical at West Yorkshire Playhouse in Leeds. She reprised the role in the forthcoming West End production of the show, which ran from August to November 2007. The musical was adapted from the first series of the television show Bad Girls; in 2005, Rogers had appeared in the show's seventh series, portraying a different character than in the musical.

At Shakespeare's Globe Theatre in London, Rogers performed as Helena in A Midsummer Night's Dream (2008), Timandra in Timon of Athens (2008), Celia in As You Like It (2009), and Lady Macbeth in Macbeth (2010).

In 2011, Rogers began performances in the West End production of The 39 Steps, as Annabella Schmidt, Margaret and Pamela (succeeding well-known Wicked actress Dianne Pilkington). In 2014, she played the role of Kay Summersby in the play Pressure at the Royal Lyceum Theatre in Edinburgh and the Chichester Festival. She later joined the play's touring revival in 2018.

On television, Rogers appeared in the 2010 Doctor Who Christmas special "A Christmas Carol", alongside Michael Gambon and Katherine Jenkins. She has also made guest appearances in various shows, including Rockface (2002), Doctors (2007, 2010, and 2019), Missing (2010), Dark Matters: Twisted But True (2012), New Tricks (2014), Holby City (2016), and EastEnders (2017). Rogers has also voiced characters in the video games The Witcher 2: Assassins of Kings (2011) and The Witcher 3: Wild Hunt (2015).

In 2023, she appeared as Clementine Churchill in When Winston Went to War with the Wireless by Jack Thorne, premiering at the Donmar Warehouse on 13 June.
