= Alex Roe =

British actor

- Born: Alexander Michael Roe-Brown; May 9, 1990 (age 36); Westminster, London, England
- Occupation: Actor
- Years active: 2000–present
- Height: 6 ft 0 in (183 cm)

Alexander Michael Roe-Brown (born May 9, 1990), known professionally as Alex Roe, is a British actor. He is best known for playing Jay Keaton in the series The Fugitives, Elliott Baden in The Cut and Benjamin Pownall in Siren. He has also played major roles in a number of films, including Hot Summer Nights, Rings and Forever My Girl.

== Early life and education ==
Roe was born in London, and grew up in Ladbroke Grove. He has a twin sister, Katheryne Elizabeth. His father worked as a plumber and his mother was a ballet dancer. He won a sixth-form scholarship to Latymer Upper School in Hammersmith where he studied until 2009.

He enjoys sports especially association football playing as a striker. He joined North London Division Two football club when he was 16, and then played in Spain for a year. After he returned to school in England and before his acting career took off, he played semi-professional football with Chalfont St Peter. While he was acting on network television, he was also playing for a Hayes Middlesex Sunday league football team Chiswick Albion in 2010. He continued playing football after he relocated to Los Angeles, where he plays for an amateur team Atlético Silverlake.

== Career ==
Roe first appeared in an advertisement for Milky Way as a child. He made his acting debut in 2000 in the horror film The Calling when he was 10 years old. Roe also played the lead role of Jay Keaton in CITV's 2005 children's science fiction series The Fugitives.

Jennifer Saunders saw him performing in a school production of Our Country's Good and asked him to audition for her comedy Jam & Jerusalem. After appearing in this production in 2009, he began to land more acting roles. In 2010, Roe played Elliott Baden, a popular competitive swimmer in BBC Two's teen drama The Cut. In 2011, Roe appeared in guest appearances in episodes of Holby City as Connor Lane, Doctors as Matt Goonan, Hollyoaks as Toby, and The Jury as Schoolboy.

In 2014, Roe landed his first television role in the United States and played the male lead as Luke Holt in ABC Family's tennis drama film Unstrung. He relocated to Los Angeles and worked in a number of Hollywood films. Roe played one of the lead roles, Evan Walker, in the 2016 science fiction film The 5th Wave, followed with a starring role as Holt Anthony in the 2017 horror film Rings.

Roe co-starred with Timothée Chalamet in the coming-of-age film Hot Summer Nights, which premiered at the South by Southwest festival in March 2017, and was released the next year. Also in 2018, he played the leading role as a country singer in Forever My Girl, and learned to sing for the role; and started playing the lead role as Ben Pownall in Freeform's TV series, Siren.

== Personal life ==
Since 2016, Roe has been in a relationship with American artist Monica Noonan. In September 2026, Noonan announced that they are expecting their first child.

== Filmography ==
=== Film ===
Year	Title	Role	Notes
2000	The Calling	Dylan St. Clair	Credited as Alex Roe-Brown
2014	Sniper: Legacy	Reese	
2016	The 5th Wave	Evan Walker	
2017	Rings	Holt Anthony	
2017	Hot Summer Nights	Hunter Strawberry	
2018	Forever My Girl	Liam Page	
2024	Bone Lake	Will / Thomas "Tom" Price	
2024	Depravity	Claude	
2024	Hazard	Will	Post-production

=== Television ===
Title	Year	Role	Notes
2005	The Fugitives	Jay Keaton	Main role
2009	Jam & Jerusalem	Christopher Martin	Episode: "Dinner Party"
2010	The Cut	Elliott Baden	Main role (seasons 2–3)
2011	Holby City	Connor Lane	Episode: "Damage Control"
2011	Doctors	Matt Goonan	Episode: "Tricky Dicky"
2011	Hollyoaks	Toby	1 episode
2011	The Jury	Schoolboy	2 episodes
2014	Unstrung	Luke Holt	Unsold television pilot
2018-2020	Siren	Ben Pownall	Main role
2022-2025	Billy the Kid	Pat Garrett	Guest (season 1); Main (seasons 2–3)
