= Hannah van der Westhuysen =

English actor (born 1995)

- Born: Hannah Jo van der Westhuysen; 26 August 1995 (age 31); Hammersmith, England
- Education: Drama Centre London
- Occupation: Actor
- Years active: 2004–present

Hannah Jo van der Westhuysen (fan-dər-vest-hay-zehn; born 26 August 1995) is an English actor. They began their career as a child actor on the CITV series The Fugitives (2005). More recently, they played Stella in the Netflix series Fate: The Winx Saga (2021–2022).

== Early life and education ==
Van der Westhuysen was born in Hammersmith, West London to a British mother and a South African father and grew up in South West London. They have dual citizenship. They took a year-long foundation course at the LAMDA before going on to graduate with a Bachelor of Arts in Acting from Drama Centre London in 2018.

Since 2022, Hannah is dating Phoebe Campbell.

== Filmography ==
=== Film ===
| Year | Title | Role | Notes |
|---|---|---|---|
| 2020 | The Bay of Silence | Becca | |
| 2021 | A Little Italian Vacation | Claire | |
| 2022 | Lamborghini: The Man Behind the Legend | Clelia Monti | |

=== Television ===
| Year | Title | Role | Notes |
|---|---|---|---|
| 2004 | Keen Eddie | Edwina Weatherhead | Episode: "Inciting Incident" |
| 2004 | Frankenstein | Eva | Miniseries |
| 2005 | The Fugitives | Fleecey Keaton | Main role |
| 2018 | Get Lost! | Amy | Television film |
| 2020 | Grantchester | Heather | 1 episode |
| 2021–2022 | Fate: The Winx Saga | Stella | Main role |
| 2022 | The Sandman | The Princess | Episode: "Dream a Little Dream of Me" |
| 2024 | Sexy Beast | Arabella Thornton | 4 Episodes |

=== Music videos ===
- "No Man's Land" (2015), Joss Stone

=== Video games ===
| Year | Title | Role | Notes |
|---|---|---|---|
| 2026 | Clive Barker's Hellraiser: Revival | The Fallen | Voice role |

== Stage ==
| Year | Title | Role | Notes |
|---|---|---|---|
| 2014 | Chalet Lines | Jolene | Bridewell Theatre, London |
| 2015 | King Lear | Cordelia | Theatro Technis, London; Bois de Boulogne, Paris |
| 2016 | Lipstick & Scones | Liz | Leicester Square Theatre, London |
| 2017 | Lunch Hour | One | Southwark Playhouse |
| 2019 | An Enemy of the People | Hannah | Playground Theatre, London |
| 2022 | Autopilot | Nic | Edinburgh Fringe Festival |
| 2023 | Salty Irina | Anna | Edinburgh Fringe Festival |
| 2024 | Fabulous Creatures | Charybdis | Arcola Theatre, London |
| 2026 | Les Liaisons Dangereuses | Cécile de Volanges | National Theatre, London |
