= The Fugitives (TV series) =

Television series

- Opening credits title
- Genre: Science fiction; Drama; Children's television
- Created by: Eileen Gallagher
- Directed by: Jane Prowse
- Starring: Alex Roe; Maureen Lipman; Elizabeth Healey; Ciara O'Connor; Nick Rowe; Hannah van der Westhuysen; Alex Hanson; Maggie Norris
- Composers: Michael Walton; Kath Gotts
- Country of origin: United Kingdom
- Original language: English
- No. of series: 1
- No. of episodes: 7

Production
- Executive producers: Eileen Gallagher; Ann McManus; Maureen Chadwick
- Producer: Jodi Reynolds
- Editor: Richard Colton
- Camera setup: Owen Knott; Gerard Giorgi-Coll
- Running time: 24 minutes

Original release
- Network: ITV (CITV)
- Release: 14 April – 26 May 2005

The Fugitives is a British children's science fiction drama series. Its first seven-part series began airing on Thursdays at 4.25pm on CITV in 2005. It was not renewed for a second series.

== Plot ==
Twelve-year-old Jay Keaton's life is in grave danger, he stumbles across a shocking discovery at the company his father used to work at. He and his friend Mel are on the run, and are on a dangerous mission to stop corrupt cloning company EmbroGen and reveal them for what they really are.

== Cast and characters ==
- Alex Roe as Jay Keaton, a typical twelve-year-old with a high IQ and a talent for numbers and science. With no real friends until Mel, he is on the run with his sister Fleecey after the exposure of a family secret.
- Hannah van der Westhuysen as Fleecey Keaton, Jay's bubbly nine-year-old sister.
- Ciara O'Connor as Melanie "Mel" Banks, Jay's fiery and outspoken friend who joins him on the run.
- Alex Roe as J2, one of Jay's first clones, used by EmbroGen to impersonate Jay.
- Alexander Hanson as Marshall Keaton, scientist and Father to Jay and Fleecey.
- Jack Ellis as Salko, the shadowy and sinister head of EmbroGen.
- Maggie Norris as Lorraine Keaton, Mother to Jay and Fleecey.
- Melanie Hill as Glenda Banks, Mother to Mel and Kelly.
- Maureen Lipman as Maggie Wych, an mysterious and eccentric woman who befriends Jay.
- Nick Rowe as Boyer, one of Salko's operatives at EmbroGen.
- Elizabeth Healey as Lomas, one of Salko's operatives at EmbroGen.
- Jonathan Wrather as Harry Keaton, Jay's uncle who Jay had not met until he received a mysterious email telling him all about EmbroGen and the Eden project.
- Lalage Lumley as Kelly Banks, Mel's younger sister, who befriends J2.

== Episode guide ==
- Episode 1 -- 12-year-old Jay Keaton's life is in danger. The gravest danger...ever since he discovered that thanks to a long forgotten family secret – he holds the key to human life in his hands.

Using a secret listening device, Jay overhears his Dad, Marshall, discussing him with two shadowy operatives from infamous Genetics Company EmbroGen. He sneaks out of his bedroom in time to see that one of the operatives, Lomas, is wearing a very distinctive ring. Fearing that he is about to become a subject of EmbroGen's experiments, Jay decides that the only option is to run. Later that night, he packs a bag and then sneaks downstairs into Marshall's office and copies his computer files onto a memory stick.

The following morning, Jay insists on riding into school with his Mum, Lorraine, and younger sister Fleecey. Giving Fleecey the homework he completed for her the night before, he tells her that she may not always be able to rely on him in the future. Meanwhile, back at the Keaton family home, Marshall finds that all of the files have been deleted from his computer. Lomas and Boyer realise that this must be Jay's work and set about tracking him down.

Jay dodges out of his physics A’level exam at the very last moment. He is intercepted in the corridor by Lomas who flashes a fake Police ID and tells him that Marshall has been involved in a car accident. Alarm bells start to ring in Jay's head when he remembers that Lorraine has the family car, and when he recognises Lomas's distinctive ring, he realises that it is time to start running.

By setting off a fire alarm, Jay manages to evade Boyer and Lomas. By the time the operatives arrive back at EmbroGen HQ to receive an ear-bashing from their boss, Salko, Jay is making good his escape on a bus. But then a Ticket Inspector climbs on board and fearing that this might be another EmbroGen trick, Jay gets off at the very next stop.

Now stranded in what looks like a very rough part of town, it's not long before Jay runs into serious trouble. His bag is stolen by a gang of bullies and with it the precious files. Just when it looks like all is lost, a girl called Mel steps in and saves the day. However, as soon as she returns Jay's bag to him, the gang return with reinforcements and the two are forced to take sanctuary in her home. After Jay tells her that he has nowhere else to go, Mel offers him a bed for the night...inside her wardrobe!

As Marshall and Lorraine start to worry, Jay sneaks out of the wardrobe and begins to tidy Mel's extremely messy bedroom. The following morning, Mel's Mum, Glenda is astonished when she walks into the now spotless room and praises Mel who is quick to assume the credit. But then the alarm starts to sound on Jay's phone and Glenda discovers his hiding place. Glenda is livid and, not only does she ground Mel, she threatens to confiscate her mobile phone. Fed up with taking orders, Mel decides to join Jay on his adventure.

Whilst Lorraine, Marshall and Glenda are busy making a police appeal for the kids’ safe return, EmbroGen's powerful boss, Salko is closing the net. As the two fugitives take refuge in a shed on an allotment, Jay tells Mel that they are being followed and that they must find the one person he can trust to help them – his Uncle Harry. For Mel it's still a game – though maybe Jay can convince her otherwise when he shows her a photo of ten identical boys, all of whom look exactly like him. Could he be a clone?

- Episode 2 -- The disappearance of Mel Banks and Jay Keaton is headline news and their worried parents have made distressed television appeals for their safe return. Meanwhile, Mel isn't convinced by the photograph that Jay has shown her of the clones – her friend's little brother could do a better job on his computer, and anyway, if EmbroGen were going to clone anyone, surely they would have picked someone like David Beckham. Despite the fact that Mel is getting tired, Jay insists that they press on – they've got to find Uncle Harry.

At the Banks's house, Glenda comforts her younger daughter, Kelly, who is desperately missing Mel. Over at the Keaton's Fleecey is in a similar state, refusing to go to school and insisting that she be allowed to go looking for Jay. Boyer and Lomas are still on the hunt for the two fugitives – they know that Jay has stolen vital documents from his father Marshall's laboratory and they want them – and him – back. They speak to Marshall and offer him a deal – if he returns to work for EmbroGen, they will call off the hunt for Jay. Marshall refuses.

Mel and Jay find themselves in a shopping centre. Jay finds a cyber-café and goes to try and contact Uncle Harry, before leaving; he gives Mel all of the money that Uncle Harry sent to him so that she can buy a newspaper. But on the way to buy a newspaper, Mel is sidetracked by a skirt and a top she sees in a clothes shop and uses all of Jay's money to buy them. Jay is angry when he finds out what Mel has done, but when he takes the clothes back to the shop, the sales assistant refuses to refund his money unless he can show her the receipt.

Jay leaves the shop in search of Mel and the receipt, but when he returns to the place where he left her, she's nowhere to be found. While Jay was in the shop, she saw her mum, Glenda, appealing for her return on the television and decided to return home. However, she used her mobile phone – the one thing that Jay made her promise she wouldn't do – to call home first. Back at EmbroGen, Salko has successfully tracked Mel's call and sends Lomas to pick her up.

Jay is alone once again – his only hope to save them both is to reach Uncle Harry before Boyer and Lomas find him.

Glenda is over the moon when she receives a call from the police to tell her that she can collect Mel from the police station. However, the call is just a trick to get her out of the house for long enough for Lomas to intercept Mel. When she arrives home, Mel is surprised to find the house empty but for Lomas who pretends to be a police detective. Lomas is carrying an official looking badge and so Mel has no reason but to agree when she offers to take her to her grandma's to be reunited with her mum and her younger sister. But then when the EmbroGen operative drives straight past the road that her grandma lives on, Mel realises that she is in serious trouble.

Lomas drives Mel straight to EmbroGen's HQ. As she is led through the dark vaults of their creepy laboratory, she is shocked to see Jay's face peering out of one of the cell windows. Then she sees him again, and again, and again...Mel has just stumbled on the results of human cloning!

- Episode 3 -- Jay is saved from the shadowy figure by a strange old woman called Maggie Wych and her scruffy dog, Nash. Maggie seems kind and trustworthy, but what sort of woman lives in a rundown old car parked up on a pile of bricks? Meanwhile, Mel has been imprisoned in the depths of the EmbroGen laboratory. She is terrified when Boyer and Lomas take her into a small room for questioning – what are they planning to do with her?

Back at home, poor little Fleecey is unhappy. She starts to suspect that her father, Marshall, is more involved in Jay's disappearances than he admits and sets about proving it. After bedtime, she sneaks out of her room and breaks into Marshall's briefcase where she finds many secret papers belonging to EmbroGen. The following morning, she asks her mother, Lorraine, what EmbroGen is. Marshall has no choice but to admit that he has gone back to work for them. Lorraine is very angry and tells Marshall that if he does go back to work at EmbroGen, she wants nothing more to do with him.

Jay begins to relax in Maggie's company and even manages to start up her car radio. But when he hears a news report about his and Mel's disappearance, he realises that Mel never made it home safely. She must have been caught and taken to EmbroGen. Jay has the biggest decision of his life to make. He holds the secret files that could change the world forever in one hand – and his new comrade Mel's life in the other. Maggie however, seems sure that Jay will make the right choice. For a moment, it seems that Jay is on the verge of asking Maggie to look after his precious memory stick for him, but does he really trust her that much? Before leaving, he does give her his mobile phone and asks her to use it to set up a decoy.

Now christened ‘M1’, Mel is led to a large room where she and the Jay clones are forced to undergo gruelling bio-metric tests to assess their intelligence. But as Mel begins to fear that she may never be able to leave EmbroGen in one piece, Jay, with the aid of a video camera and a laptop, has managed to breach the lab's security and is already tip-toeing his way down the maze of underground corridors in search of her. Looking for somewhere to hide, Jay finds himself in a storage room full of clothes...this gives him an idea.

Lomas arrives at the Keaton home to collect Marshall. Lorraine can't believe that he could desert the family during such a terrible time. But things are about to get much worse – Fleecey has managed to hide herself in the boot of Lomas's car! Lorraine now has to cope with the fact that both of her children are missing.

Mel is beginning to give up hope when one of the Jay clones arrives with her dinner. Although she is even more depressed when she realises that the plate contains a very boring looking stew and not the chips that she had been hoping for, she soon cheers up when she realises that the clone is in fact the real Jay! But then the alarms begin to sound. Realising that they only have a limited amount of time to get out of the EmbroGen building, Jay leads Mel on a dash down the corridors until they reach the storage room. Quickly, they change back into their own clothes and make their way out of the building.

Still with Fleecey in the boot of their car, Boyer and Lomas set off in search of Mel and the clone they are sure helped her escape. At EmbroGen, Salko and another of his operatives review the video footage taken from the security cameras in the underground laboratory. They realise that the boy couldn't have been a clone because both of his eyes were the same colour...the boy must have been Jay!

Mel and Jay finally arrive at Uncle Harry's house. But Mel has a huge shock when Uncle Harry opens the door – it is the same man she saw watching when she was being questioned back at EmbroGen!

- Episode 4 -- The seemingly benign Uncle Harry welcomes Mel and Jay into his home. But Mel is wary; she has seen him before – at EmbroGen. She pleads with Jay to leave, but Jay ignores her and steps into Harry's clutches, pulling her in after him. Once inside, Uncle Harry is soon laying on the tea and biscuits and telling Jay all about his father Marshall's ‘evil’ plan. Although he is relieved when Uncle Harry assures him that he is not a clone but rather the original blueprint, Jay is horrified when he discovers that he is a ‘chimera’ – someone with twice the number of genes and two complete sets of DNA. Mel is still suspicious of Uncle Harry and can only look on in horror as Jay willingly hands over his precious memory stick full of the genetic code to cloning.

Meanwhile, Fleecey is still rattling around in the boot of Boyer and Lomas's car. The two EmbroGen operatives receive a signal from Jay's mobile phone and drive off to intercept it, unaware that the phone was switched on by Maggie and is currently lying in an area of waste ground. While Boyer and Lomas search for the phone, Fleecey takes the opportunity to slip out of the boot undetected. She is later discovered in her hiding place by Maggie.

Jay comes to his senses when Uncle Harry refuses to follow Mel's suggestion that he should throw the memory stick into the fire and instead, puts it straight into his safe. Now realising that Mel was right about Uncle Harry all along, they wait until nightfall to make a daring escape from his house. After they spend the night sleeping in a barn, Jay reveals to Mel that the memory stick he gave to Uncle Harry was a fake – he left the real one with Maggie! He and Mel manage to make their way back to Maggie's car where they are reunited with Fleecey.

Salko is furious when he hears that Uncle Harry has allowed Jay to slip through his fingers and orders Boyer and Lomas to locate him and remove him from the project...for good!

The two distraught mothers Glenda and Lorraine unite in a bid to locate their missing children. Now that Marshall has gone back to work for EmbroGen, Lorraine's convinced that the company is at the root of Mel, Jay and Fleecey's disappearance. The two women pay a visit to EmbroGen HQ and refuse to leave the front desk until someone can tell them what is going on. Then Boyer appears and takes Lorraine and Glenda on a guided tour of the building. When the two women ask to see Marshall, Boyer insists that there is no-one by that name working for EmbroGen.

As his wife leaves the building, Marshall is taken down to the underground laboratory by Salko and introduced to the clones. He is horrified when he discovers that EmbroGen have cloned his son, but while Jay is still on the run, he has no choice but to aid Salko in his plan to create a world full of perfect children.

Although he is initially delighted to be reunited with Fleecey, Jay knows that there is no way that he can continue to stay on the run with a nine-year-old in tow, especially when she is already getting on Mel's nerves. As he, Mel and Maggie begin to consider their next move, Salko and Boyer have achieved a breakthrough back at EmbroGen – their cameras have taken photographs of Maggie – surely it won't take very long to locate such a colourful and well-known local character.

- Episode 5 -- The nationwide hunt is still on for the three fugitives; Jay, Melanie and little Fleecey. Up until now they have felt relatively safe, living under the protective care of Maggie Wych and her scruffy dog Nash. But it's getting risky – they need to move on before they are traced. Maggie and the children set about tinkering with her old car to urge it back on the road.

Jay's father, Marshall Keaton has been forced to leave home and work for EmbroGen. Realising that there is a flaw in the new Eden formula, he begs to be given access to the clones. Salko reluctantly agrees and allows him to examine one clone, J2. Marshall is horrified when he discovers that J2 is suffering from a number of medical conditions caused by poor diet and no exercise.

Instead of the children, Boyer finds nothing more than a patch of oil where Maggie's car used to stand. Maggie has taken the children to the safety of her tumbledown cottage in the countryside. Before leaving with Nash, she makes Jay, Mel and Fleecey promise not to leave the cottage – the only way they will be safe is if they remain out of sight. Urging Jay to remain strong, she gives him a small black wallet and tells him to keep it safe – she's sure that one day he'll need it. She also returns Jay's memory stick.

Salko refuses Marshall any further access to J2; he has other plans for the boy. It's not long before Lorraine Keaton receives a call to say that her son Jay has been found. But this poor mother is soon the victim of a terrifying conspiracy when she brings home a boy who looks and sounds like her son, but is in actually fact a clone – J2.

Fleecey is growing restless at Maggie's house. Although Jay has managed to fix the generator and is trying hard to get the television working, there's nothing he can do about the food supply which includes ancient tinned food and vegetables dug up from the garden. After an argument with Mel, Fleecey sneaks out of the house and heads for the nearest sweet shop. Unaware of Fleecey's disappearance, Jay and Mel finally manage to tune the TV in and are shocked when they see a news report all about ‘Jay's’ return home.

Boyer tracks Fleecey down to a sweet shop and, after attaching a tracking device to her coat, asks her where Jay is. Fleecey panics and runs out of the shop, unaware that she is leading Boyer and his sidekick Lomas straight back to the cottage. Fleecey shouts to Mel and Jay who run out of the front door in time to see the two EmbroGen operatives climb out of their car...but what has happened to Fleecey?

Jay and Mel take refuge in a covered well in one of the fields behind the cottage but Boyer and Lomas quickly manage to track them down. Lomas informs Jay that Fleecey is lying in the road having been hit by her car and offers him a deal – she'll call an ambulance for Fleecey as long as he gives her the memory stick. Jay has no option but to do what Lomas asks.

Now in possession of the memory stick with its precious contents, Boyer and Lomas close and lock the heavy iron lid that covers the well shaft. It seems that Mel and Jay's time on the run may have come to a horrifying end.

- Episode 6 -- The two fugitives, Jay and Mel are trapped in a deep well and it looks like their condemned to a terrifying end. A slim shaft of daylight glimmers into the dark depths but the heavy iron lid remains stuck fast. Mel is beginning to tire and is struggling to keep her grip on the ladder when Jay comes up with a brainwave and, with the aid of Mel's lip balm, manages to lubricate the rusty lock on the lid enough to open it.

Meanwhile, Jay's younger sister, Fleecey is lying injured in a nearby hospital. She was found lying in the road, a victim of a hit-and-run – left to die by both Boyer and Lomas. Lorraine sits with her gravely ill daughter, terrified she might lose her when she has only just got her back. Her new friend, Mel's mum Glenda, makes her a kind offer – she will take home and look after the other recent returnee, Jay, so that Lorraine can remain with Fleecey in hospital. But it looks like the only thing that will save Fleecey now is a kidney transplant.

Back at EmbroGen, the evil Salko is delighted that the memory stick is now in his hands – the cloning experiment can go ahead. Now he has the stick, he has no further use for Jay's father, Marshall, and orders Boyer to dispose of him. But at the last minute, Marshall is saved when Lomas informs Salko that the data on the memory stick is encrypted and that Marshall is the only person who will be able to access it. Marshall returns to work and proves whose side he's really on once and for all when he is given the opportunity to sabotage the computer system formulating the new clone project – Eden II.

Used to living in the EmbroGen laboratory, J2 is overwhelmed by the sights and sounds in Glenda's house and collapses. But, after sharing a midnight feast under the dining room table with Mel's younger sister, Kelly, J2 realises that he enjoys living as part of a family.

As Marshall's attempt to sabotage the Eden II project is thwarted when a suspicious Lomas changes the computer authorisation code, Jay desperately tries to convince a tired Mel that they must return to EmbroGen to stop Salko's evil plan. But how do they regain access to the building? Just when all looks lost, Jay pulls Maggie's wallet out of his pocket and opens it, stunned when he finds a detailed map of the EmbroGen building. Before long, both children are crawling through the drainage system.

After overhearing a conversation between Salko and Lomas, Jay is convinced that his father, Marshall, is doing EmbroGen's dirty work and decides to do all that he can to stop him. Not realising that Marshall is in fact trying desperately to sabotage the Eden II project, Jay locks him into a small room.

After a late night talk with Glenda, J2 asks to be taken to the hospital where he offers to donate one of his own kidneys to save his ‘sister’ Fleecey. Meanwhile, it is a race against time for Jay and Mel who are desperate to free the clones before Salko retires them to an early death.

- Episode 7 -- Time is now against Mel and Jay. It seems like EmbroGen has won – as Salko gets ready to receive his shadowy consortium to show them that the new clone project, Eden II, has been a success. All that's left for the two fugitives is to gain access to the secret underground laboratories to at least save the existing clones before it's too late. Jay manages to collapse one of the ventilation tunnels on top of an EmbroGen guard and steals his keycard in order to open up the clone's cells.

After managing to convince the brainwashed clones that a better life awaits them outside their EmbroGen prison, Jay comes face to face with his father. Seeing that Jay is planning on helping the clones to escape, Marshall desperately tries to talk some sense into him, telling him that even if he does manage to get the clones to safety, EmbroGen will still have Eden II, and possibly after that, Eden III. It is decision time for Jay; can he trust the man he believes to be responsible for the terrifying journey that has led him here?

Marshall emails a video transmission to the world's press, telling them to visit the EmbroGen website in an hour's time. Then he calls Salko from his office, distracting him just long enough for Jay to be able to hide a remote controlled video camera behind the gigantic portrait of Salko that is about to be hung on the wall.

Salko welcomes his guests – relishing the most important day of his life. He is holding the future of the human race in his hands. Eden II will correct the ‘errors’ of the previous clone project and the world will never be the same again. But unbeknownst to him, Mel is leading the clones through the corridors. At ten o’clock, as Marshall is brought to Salko's side to answer questions from the backers, Mel and the clones arrive. She uncovers the skylight and reveals the clones to the shocked backers and to the press who are watching Marshall's webcast.

In the confusion that follows, Marshall and Jay manage to grab the memory stick. Seeing that all is lost, Salko tries to make his escape. The day is saved by Maggie Wych and Nash who appear in one of the corridors. Maggie reveals herself as the Professor who taught Salko at University and who vowed to one day stop his evil plans. She watches as he is bundled away into a waiting police car. But is this really the end for Salko? As the car pulls away, the police officers are revealed as none other than Lomas and Boyer!

At the hospital, Lorraine and Glenda have already watched their children; Mel and Jay give an interview to the press outside the EmbroGen building on the television. By the time Mel, Jay and Marshall arrive at the hospital for a happy reunion; Fleecey and J2 are both making a good recovery from their operations.

Three months later...

Maggie has taken nine of the clones to live in her cottage with her. Meanwhile, J2 is now a part of the Keaton family and a happy Fleecey now has two brainbox brothers to help her with her homework. Meanwhile, Mel has got a bee in her bonnet about digital brains...could this be another adventure for the fugitives?
