= Alexander Hanson (actor) =

Norwegian-English stage actor (born 1961)

- Born: Alexander Harald St John Hanson; 28 April 1961 (age 65); Oslo, Norway
- Other name: Alexander Harald St John Hanson
- Occupation: Actor
- Spouse: Samantha Bond (m. 1989)
- Children: 2

Alexander Harald St John Hanson (born 28 April 1961) is a Norwegian-English stage actor who has appeared in numerous plays and musicals in the West End, and also on Broadway.

== Personal life ==
Alexander Harald St John Hanson was born in Oslo, Norway. His mother, Ellen, was half-French, half-Norwegian, and his father was English. After his parents' divorce, his mother remarried George Akins, a Nottingham businessman. He initially prepared for a career in hotels and catering, but then decided on a career in acting, and entered drama school. Hanson is an alumnus of Guildhall School of Music and Drama.

Hanson has been married since 1989 to actress Samantha Bond, and has two children with her, Molly and Tom.

== Career ==
Hanson appeared in the West End production of An Ideal Husband in November 2010, opposite his wife Samantha Bond. He starred in the West End production of A Little Night Music, and also appeared in the transfer of that production to Broadway in 2009–2010.

Hanson starred in the high-profile West End revival of The Sound of Music in 2006 as Captain Georg Von Trapp. He was brought in to replace Simon Shepherd, who bowed out of the show during previews. Hanson originated the role of Khashoggi in London's We Will Rock You, leaving the production after seven months.

Hanson played Captain Macheath in the Royal National Theatre production of The Villain's Opera, Nick Dear and Stephen Warbeck's updating of The Beggars Opera in 2000.

in 1995, Hanson played Joe Gillis, the male lead in Sunset Boulevard, opposite Elaine Paige and then Petula Clark at the Adelphi Theatre. He played Pilate in the 2012 UK arena tour of Andrew Lloyd Webber and Tim Rice's popular musical Jesus Christ Superstar, and reprised the role in the 2013 leg of the tour.

In 2013, Hanson was cast in the title role in Stephen Ward the Musical, Andrew Lloyd Webber's musical telling the story of the Profumo scandal.

=== Theatre ===
- Marguerite as Otto
- The Sound of Music
- Talking to Terrorists for Out of Joint and Royal Court Theatre
- We Will Rock You (original cast) as Khashoggi
- Enter the Guardsman and Brel
- The Things We Do For Love
- Shallow End
- Sunset Boulevard as Joe Gillis
- Cabaret as Cliff
- Arcadia
- Aspects of Love as Alex Dillingham
- Valentine's Day
- Copenhagen
- The Villain's Opera
- Troilus and Cressida
- Candide
- The Merchant of Venice and The London Cuckolds
- Cracked and The Memory of Water
- A Little Night Music as Fredrik Egerman (West End and Broadway 2009/2010 revival)
- An Ideal Husband
- Jesus Christ Superstar (The Arena Tour as Pontius Pilate)
- Stephen Ward the Musical as Stephen Ward
- Follies as Ben Stone

=== Film and television ===
- How to Make a Killing
- Party Animals
- The Bill
- Kidulthood
- The Fugitives
- Murder City
- Auf Wiedersehen, Pet
- The Last Detective
- Rosemary & Thyme
- Heartbeat
- Beech is Back
- Relic Hunters
- Casualty
- The Merchant of Venice
- The Escort
- Unfinished Business
- Peak Practice
- Doctor Finlay
- Poetry Readings
- Ffizz
- Father Brown
- Fellow Traveller
- Museums of Madness
- The Black Candle
- Taking the Floor
- Boon
- The Chief
- Six Characters in Search of an Author
- Lewis
- Pressure
