= Bad Girls: The Musical =

Bad Girls
- The Musical
- Bad Girls original poster
- Music: Kath Gotts
- Lyrics: Kath Gotts
- Book: Maureen Chadwick; Ann McManus
- Basis: ITV television series Bad Girls
- Productions: 2006 Leeds; 2007 West End; 2016 Off-West End; 2019 Camden

Bad Girls: The Musical is a stage musical based on the ITV prison drama series Bad Girls, with a book by Maureen Chadwick and Ann McManus, and music and lyrics by Kath Gotts.

== Productions ==
The original production was developed and directed by Maggie Norris. Auditions were at the West Yorkshire Playhouse in Leeds in June 2006. The West End production began previews at the Garrick Theatre on 16 August 2007, and officially opened on 12 September 2007. The show closed two months later with the final performance staged on 17 November 2007. Nicole Faraday, who played the role of Shell Dockley in both productions, won the prestigious TMA Award for Best Supporting Role in a Musical in 2006 and was nominated again for the role of Shell at the Whatsonstage.com Awards 2007–2008.

Professional revivals have been staged at the Union Theatre, London (9 March – 2 April 2016) and Upstairs at the Gatehouse, London (13 February – 3 March 2019), again starring Nicole Faraday in the role of Shell Dockley.

An original cast recording was released in 2008. A DVD recording of the original West End production was released in February 2009.

== Synopsis ==
=== Act I ===
Rachel Hicks arrives at Larkhall Prison. She meets prison officers Sylvia Hollamby and Jim Fenner, wing governor Helen Stewart, and the other women of Larkhall ("I Shouldn't Be Here"). Fenner behaves in a friendly manner to Rachel, who is distraught over having her baby removed from her custody.

Rachel is visited by Shell Dockley and her sidekick Denny Blood, who introduce Rachel to life in prison. Shell offers Rachel her protection ("Guardian Angel"). Rachel tells Fenner about the encounter but is brushed off.

Governor Helen places Nikki Wade, a long-term inmate, on an enhanced regime (Note: A form of incentive for prisoners who have demonstrated a willingness to be rehabilitated, including additional spending money and extended visitation rights.) as incentive to win an appeal. Fenner and Sylvia disagree with the decision but congratulate themselves on their skills ("Jailcraft"). During the performance, Fenner communicates with Number One, the governor in charge of Larkhall Prison, regarding his lack of faith in Helen's abilities.

During the transportation of Nikki, a fight breaks out between Nikki and Shell. Nikki is blamed and put in segregation where she laments the events that placed her in prison ("One Moment"). Helen visits Nikki and reinstates her enhanced status. Helen relays the bad news to Julie Saunders and Julie Johnston that Saunder's child has been taken into foster care. Johnston is unsurprised ("Life of Grime").

Yvonne Atkins arrives, whom Shell perceives as a threat to her standing in the prison. Yvonne has successfully smuggled in alcohol and cigarettes and the inmates have an impromptu party. The alcohol prompts Nikki to flirt with Helen, who rebuffs her.

It is revealed that Fenner is a sexual predator who sneaks into inmates' rooms after hours ("The Key"). He assaults Shell and then forces his way into Rachel's room. The following morning, Rachel is found hanged in her cell. The unsympathetic behaviour of the prison officers prompts a protest ("That's The Way It Is"), which escalates into an all-out riot.

=== Act II ===
After the riot, the inmates are on lockdown, and lament their confinement ("Freedom Road"). Fenner convinces Number One to offer him the job of wing governor ("The Future Is Bright"), but Helen is prepared to fight for her job at tribunal.

The lockdown ends and after a power struggle, Shell and Denny are assigned to the canteen, prompting a hunger strike led by Yvonne. Helen negotiates for Julie to speak to her son, and she confessed to lying about where she is ("Sorry").

Nikki visits Helen in her office. After a tense encounter, interrupted by Justin, they both individually struggle with their feelings for each other ("Every Night"). Justin visits Helen's home, where she rebuffs his advances and confesses that Nikki got under her skin.

Back at the prison, Yvonne befriends Denny and tells the Julies of her attraction to Justin ("All Banged Up"). Drugs are found at the prison in Shell's possession, planted by Fenner in an attempt to discredit Helen. She decides to join Justin and Nikki's attempt to save Helen's career ("The Baddest and the Best").

Shell, Nikki and Justin embark on a sting to catch Fenner where Shell has to seduce him ("First Lady"). It succeeds, but Shell also sets fire to the cell ("The Baddest and the Best (Reprise)").

There is a celebration for Denny's 21st birthday, and Yvonne has arranged a fireworks' display. Nikki and Helen confess their feelings for each other ("This Is My Life"). A helicopter appears – Yvonne has arranged for a prison break using her husband's criminal connections. She takes Denny with her to "serve their time" in Spain.

== Characters ==
The musical features a mix of adapted television characters and original creations. Helen Stewart, Nikki Wade, Shell Dockley, Denny Blood, Crystal Gordon, Noreen Biggs, the two Julies, and Yvonne Atkins all appear in the television series. Dominic McAllister's name was changed to Justin Mattison for the musical; however, the character is exactly the same from throughout the television show.

== Cast ==
Original Leeds Production (2006)

- Helen Stewart – Laura Rogers
- Jim Fenner – Hal Fowler
- Sylvia "Bodybag" Hollamby – Rachel Izen
- Justin Mattison – Neil McDermott
- Crystal Gordon – Dawn Hope
- Yvonne Atkins – Ellen O'Grady
- Shell Dockley – Nicole Faraday
- Julie Saunders – Julie Jupp
- Julie Johnston – Louise Plowright
- Denny Blood – Amanda Posener
- Rachel Hicks – Elaine Glover
- Nikki Wade – Hannah Waddingham
- The Number One – Michael N Harbour
- Noreen Biggs – Tricia Deighton

West End Production (2007)

- Helen Stewart – Laura Rogers
- Jim Fenner – David Burt
- Sylvia 'Bodybag' Hollamby – Helen Fraser
- Justin Mattison – Chris Grierson
- Crystal Gordon – Camilla Beeput
- Yvonne Atkins – Sally Dexter
- Shell Dockley – Nicole Faraday
- Julie Saunders – Julie Jupp
- Julie Johnston – Rebecca Wheatley
- Rachel Hicks – Emily Aston
- Denny Blood – Amanda Posener
- Nikki Wade – Caroline Head
- The Number One – Michael N Harbour
- Noreen Biggs – Maria Charles

Four former cast members of Bad Girls feature in the West End musical, with Helen Fraser as Sylvia "Bodybag" Hollamby and Maria Charles as Noreen Biggs reprising their original roles from the television series. Nicole Faraday, who plays Shell Dockley in the musical, played Snowball Merriman in series 4 and 5 of Bad Girls and Laura Rogers, who plays the part of Wing Governor Helen Stewart, played the role of drug addict inmate Sheena Williams in series 7.

== Song list ==
Act I

- I Shouldn't Be Here – Shell, Crystal, Denny, Julie S, Julie J, Nikki, Jim, Sylvia, Helen and Prisoners.
- Guardian Angel – Shell and Denny
- Jailcraft – Jim, Sylvia and Number One
- One Moment – Nikki
- Life of Grime – Julie J, Julie S and Prisoners
- A-List – Yvonne and Prisoners
- The Key – Jim, Shell and Rachel
- That's the Way It Is – Helen, Sylvia, Yvonne, Shell, Nikki, Julie J, Julie S, Number One, Jim, Prisoners and Officers

Act II

- Freedom Road – Crystal
- The Future Is Bright – Jim, Sylvia and Officers
- Sorry – Julie S
- Every Night – Nikki and Helen
- All Banged Up – Yvonne, Julie J, Julie S and Justin
- The Baddest and the Best – Nikki, Denny, Justin, Yvonne, Julie J, Julie S, Shell, Crystal and Prisoners
- First Lady – Shell and Jim
- Baddest and the Best (Reprise) – Shell
- This Is My Life – Nikki, Helen and Prisoners

This is the final song list for the production at the Garrick Theatre which differs slightly to the audition at the West Yorkshire Playhouse. For example, the song "P-P-P-Please" that featured in the Leeds run was cut from the West End Production. The second number, "An Angel Like You", in Leeds, was rewritten as "Guardian Angel" for the West End.

A cast album from the West End was recorded for First Night Records and released in 2008.

== See also ==
- Bad Girls (television series)
