= Andrew McKay (actor) =

English actor (born 1981)

Andrew McKay (born 18 February 1981 in Guildford) is an English actor, best known for playing the role of Daniel Renshaw in Family Affairs from 2001 to 2002. He more recently appeared as Al in EastEnders in August 2006.
