= Maggie Norris =

American fashion designer

Maggie Norris is an American fashion designer.

== Early life and education ==
Maggie Norris was born in New Orleans, and attended the School of the New Orleans Museum of Art in New Orleans, Louisiana. She then moved to New York City to attend Parsons School of Design and the Art Students League.

== Career ==
After her graduation, she was recruited by Ralph Lauren as Creative Designer, and she quickly ascended the corporate ladder to become Senior Design Director, in charge of the Women's Collection. There, she oversaw all the Women's ready-to-wear and accessory collections and was in charge of seeking out inspiration for the overall direction of the line.

In 1998, Norris left Ralph Lauren and moved to Europe to work as Chief Designer for Mondi womenswear.

In 2000, Norris returned to the United States and founded Maggie Norris Couture in New York City. In 2003, she joined the Council of Fashion Designers of America (CFDA).

Maggie Norris Couture creations have been featured in publications such as Vogue, Vanity Fair, W, Elle, and The New York Times, among many others.

Norris's custom-made creations have been worn by various celebrities and socialites, among whom are Nicole Kidman, Naomi Watts, Keisha Omilana, Jennifer Aniston, Alicia Keys, Halle Berry, Sharon Stone, Beyoncé Knowles, Diane Keaton, Anna Getty, Somers Farkas and Michelle Obama.

=== Exhibitions ===
In 2006, Norris's work was featured in the "Love and War" Exhibition at the Fashion Institute of Technology Museum. That same year, Maggie Norris appeared in the "New York Society" Exhibition of the Museum of the City of New York.

In 2007, her work was included in the Victoria & Albert Museum's "New York Fashion Now" Exhibition and corresponding book entitled "New York Fashion" by Sonnet Stanfill.

In 2008, Norris co-organized the "Tableaux" Exhibition at the New York Plaza Hotel, in collaboration with Aman & Carson Interiors.

In February 2010, Maggie Norris Couture co-presented the exhibition "An Evening of New York Couture" at the Verdura Salon, in collaboration with Verdura and Aman & Carson Interiors. Maggie Norris Couture dressed Sarah Bradford and Princess Keisha Omilana of Ipetu-Ijesha for this occasion.

=== Events ===
In addition to hosting fashion shows, Norris also acts as an event organizer.

In 2006, Maggie Norris Couture hosted the event called "1950s New York" at the Café Carlyle, in collaboration with Boucheron Bijoux and Grace Hightower De Niro, to benefit "Operation Smile". This event was an homage to legendary pianist Bobby Short.

In 2008, Maggie Norris Couture has also been celebrated by esteemed American painter Nelson Shanks in a portrait of Keira Chaplin wearing the "Katarina" Corset, a portrait soon to be hung at the National Gallery of Art in Washington, DC.

=== Publications (books and TV) ===
In 2006, the Norris's "Caron" Gown was featured in Valerie Steele's book entitled "The Black Dress".

Sonnet Stanfill's book, "New York Fashion" describes Norris as being part of a new generation of "talented, young New York-based designers [who] have earned considerable commercial and critical success." That same year, Norris was featured in CBS Sunday Morning in connection with the "Dangerous Liaisons: Fashion and Furniture in the 18th Century" Exhibition of the Metropolitan Museum of Art.

In 2008, Lauren Ezersky covered the Maggie Norris Couture event "The Night They Invented Champagne", directed by Andrew Le Pera for the program "Behind the Velvet Ropes". In 2010, Maggie Norris Couture was also the subject of a program covered by Lauren Ezersky on Better TV.
