= Sonnet Stanfill =

American-born British curator and writer

- Born: Anchorage, Alaska, U.S.
- Education: Smith College; Courtauld Institute of Art
- Occupations: Senior Curator of Fashion, Victoria and Albert Museum
- Years active: 1999–present

Sonnet Stanfill is an American-born British curator and writer. She is Senior Curator of Fashion at the Victoria and Albert Museum (V&A) in London. Stanfill is known for curating exhibitions that explore modern and contemporary fashion, as well as for her writing and advocacy work in the field of fashion studies.

== Early life and education ==
Stanfill studied history of art at Smith College in Massachusetts, then earned a Master's degree in the History of Dress from the Courtauld Institute of Art in London.

== Career ==
Stanfill began her career in the commercial sector, working as a buyer in San Francisco and New York. She joined the V&A in 1999 as Assistant Curator and was promoted to Curator in 2002. In 2015, she became Senior Curator in the Furniture, Textiles and Fashion department. She has served as a scientific committee member of the Musées Yves Saint Laurent in Paris and Marrakech and chair of the Courtauld Association Committee. In 2017, she delivered a TEDx talk that explored the gender imbalance in culture leadership. She served as a Gilbert Fellow at the Los Angeles County Museum of Art. She is a scientific committee member of the European Fashion Heritage Association (EFHA).

=== Exhibitions ===
Stanfill has curated a number of fashion exhibitions at the V&A, including:

- Ossie Clark (2003)
- New York Fashion Now (2007)
- Ballgowns: British Glamour Since 1950 (2012)
- The Glamour of Italian Fashion (2014), which toured to four North American venues
- Naomi: In Fashion (2024–25), on the supermodel Naomi Campbell, the museum's first exhibition to focus on a Black female creative
- Schiaparelli: Fashion Becomes Art (2026), the first major UK retrospective

=== Publications ===
Stanfill has written and edited multiple exhibition catalogues and academic articles. These include:

- New York Fashion. V&A Publishing. 2007. ISBN 978-1-85177-499-9.
- Ballgowns: British Glamour Since 1950. V&A Publishing. 2012. ISBN 978-1-85177-684-9.
- From Club to Catwalk: Fashion in 1980s London. V&A Publishing. 2013. ISBN 978-1-85177-725-9.
- The Glamour of Italian Fashion. V&A Publishing. 2014. ISBN 978-1-85177-823-2.
- Kries, M.; Eisenbrand, J.; Rossi, C., eds. (2018). "The Night Club as Fashion Catwalk". Night Fever: Designing Club Culture 1960–Today. Vitra Design Museum. ISBN 978-3-945852-24-8.
- Blaszczyk, R.; Poulliard, V., eds. (2018). "Anonymous Tastemakers: The Role of American Buyers in Establishing an Italian Fashion Industry". European Fashion: The Creation of a Global Industry. Manchester University Press. ISBN 978-1-5261-2211-7.
- "G.B. Giorgini: Fashion, Florence and Diplomacy, 1950–55". ZoneModa Journal. 11 (1S). 2021. ISSN 2611-0563.
- Naomi Campbell. Rizzoli. 2024. ISBN 978-0-8478-9981-4.
- Schiaparelli: Fashion Becomes Art. V&A Publishing. 2026.

Her 2016 New York Times op-ed "Taking on the Boys' Club at the Art Museum" addressed gender inequality in cultural leadership.
