= Maureen Chadwick =

British screenwriter, dramatist and television producer

Maureen Chadwick is a British screenwriter, dramatist and television producer responsible, alone and with her writing partner Ann McManus, for a number of popular award-winning and sometimes controversial British television series including Bad Girls (1999–2006), Footballers' Wives (2002–2006) and Waterloo Road (2006–2015, 2023–present). With McManus she wrote the book for the stage musical Bad Girls: The Musical (2006–2007). She was a co-founder and creative director of the independent television production company Shed Productions (1998–2010). She is now a freelance writer.

== Early life ==
Chadwick was born in Aldershot in Hampshire. In her home town 'Chad' Chadwick attended East End Junior School and the all-girls Aldershot County High School where she developed an interest in art and in stage production. Deciding to be a painter, she attended the University of Edinburgh, but, as this was the time the Gay Liberation Front was being launched, she left after two months and returned home to be nearer London, joining Farnham School of Art in nearby Farnham, Surrey. Whilst there she visited The Gateways, a lesbian club in Chelsea made famous in the film The Killing of Sister George (1968), one of the earliest mainstream films to feature lesbianism. For many women, including Chadwick, a visit to the Gateways was their first introduction to lesbian life. In 1971, after her third attempt, Chadwick finally got in when she realised she had to apply for membership, having the necessary admission card sent to her at the art college she was attending rather than the parental home:

Each time requiring cash for a train ticket up to London and a lie to my parents about why. I was wearing what I hoped was a killer combination of black jeans, lilac crepe shirt, chiffon scarf and Susannah York-style makeup. As a complete ingenue, I knew I would have to contrive to get picked up by someone older and sophisticated – and, crucially, before the club closed at 11pm. So I just stood in the middle of the dancefloor, oozing availability but rebuffing undesirables, until someone finally took the bait.

In her early 20s Chadwick moved to Bristol and became an active member of the Women's Liberation Movement there. She gained a post as a data-processing librarian, where, finding she had a great deal of time on her hands, she started to write scripts, eventually getting an agent and commencing her writing career.

== Writer and producer ==
Chadwick's first writing commissions were for the BBC medical drama Angels. Her first solo project was the BBC Play For Today Watch With Mother starring Annette Crosbie and Barbara Ewing in 1988. Her BBC Screen One film Two Golden Balls aired in 1994, starring Kim Cattrall. She has also written for various other television series including the poorly-received Eldorado for the BBC; 36 episodes of Coronation Street (1997-1999), and one episode of EastEnders (1987). In 1998 she, Ann MacManus, Eileen Gallagher and Brian Park co-founded Shed Productions, an independent British television production company. The company was bought out by Time Warner in 2010. Shed's first major production, the hit drama Bad Girls, was commissioned by ITV in the summer of 1998 and proved to be a huge success with viewers, becoming one of the UK's most consistently successful dramas during its eight series run. Alone and with McManus Chadwick wrote various episodes throughout series 1 to 5, returning as a writer for one episode of series 8.

In 2000, following the success of Bad Girls, Shed won a major new commission for primetime ITV, Footballers' Wives. During the five series it was on air, Footballers' Wives became probably the most talked-about UK drama of recent times and spawned the popular ITV2 spin-off Footballers' Wives Extra Time, and factual entertainment series Footballers' Wives TV which aired on ITV2 in 2005. Chadwick was involved in writing various episodes of series 1 to 4. 2005 also saw Shed's first foray into the realms of children's television when seven-part drama The Fugitives was commissioned by CITV.

In 2006, Shed received its first commission from BBC One, Waterloo Road, a drama series about a failing comprehensive school in Rochdale. After proving to be a huge hit with viewers, especially the valuable 16- to 24-year-old audience, Waterloo Road was immediately re-commissioned by the BBC for a second series. A further 50 episodes were commissioned and broadcast between 2012 and 2014. Chadwick wrote various episodes across the series' long run.

With her writing partner Ann McManus she wrote the book for the musical Bad Girls: The Musical to a score by Kath Gotts which, after a tryout at the West Yorkshire Playhouse in Leeds in June 2006 transferred to London's West End for previews at the Garrick Theatre on 16 August 2007 before officially opening on 12 September 2007. However, the production closed two months later with the final performance staged on 17 November 2007.

In 2008 BBC One commissioned Hope Springs, a new eight-part drama from Shed Productions through BBC Scotland with Chadwick again sharing the writing credits across the series. After a single series the BBC cancelled Hope Springs because it "did not find its audience in the way that [they] had hoped."

== Recent years ==
In 2011 Chadwick was one of the judges for the Stonewall Awards, held that year at the Victoria and Albert Museum in London. The awards celebrate the contributions made by individuals and organisations to the lives of lesbian, gay, and bisexual people in the UK.

For her 2013 play The Speed Twins at the Riverside Studios, produced by her own production company, Big Broad Productions, Chadwick returned to the theme of the lesbian nightclub The Gateways, in which she places her three female characters in a journey of discovery about themselves. Her other theatre writing credits include Joséphine (1993), a musical play about the life of Josephine Baker (Battersea Arts Centre, Oldham Coliseum Theatre and on national tour), Dust (Battersea Arts Centre), Crush: The Musical (2015), with music by Kath Gotts first performed at the Belgrade Theatre in Coventry and on national tour, set in an all-girls' school in 1963 and with lesbian undercurrents, and The Realness (2014), an urban musical about "a bad boy's roller-coaster journey from zero to hero" first performed at the Hackney Downs Studios. Today Chadwick is a freelance writer and lives in London with her civil partner, composer and lyricist Kath Gotts.

== Publications ==
- The Speed Twins, Playdead Press (2013) ISBN 0957679246
- Crush: The Musical, Maureen Chadwick and Kath Gotts, Nick Hern Books (2016)
