= Verdura =

River in Italy

Location
- Country: Italy

Physical characteristics
- Source
  - location: Lake Favara
- Mouth: Mediterranean Sea
  - location: Torre Verdura
  - coordinates: 37.4643°N 13.2025°E
- Length: 53 km (33 mi)
- Basin size: 422 km^{2} (163 sq mi)

Verdura is a river of southern Sicily, located between Sciacca and Ribera. The river's source is in Lake Favara. It flows into the sea about 2.4 km south-southeast of Torre Verdura, via Sicily Channel,

== Course ==
The upper reaches are known as the Sosio, becoming the Verdura after it is joined by the Lisandro. It is 53 kilometres (33 mi) long, with a catchment area of 422 square kilometres (163 sq mi). There are two hydroelectric dams, at Cristia and Favara. The fertile valley produces navel oranges, almonds, wine and olive oil.

== See also ==
- Fulco di Verdura, jeweller, and the last person to bear the now-defunct Sicilian ducal title of Verdura.
