= List of Hollyoaks characters introduced in 1998 =

The following is a list of characters that first appeared on the Channel 4 soap opera Hollyoaks in 1998, by first appearance.

== Tessie Thompson ==
Tessie Thompson
- Hollyoaks character
- Portrayed by: Sian Gibson
- Duration: 1998–1999, 2007
- First appearance: 8 January 1998
- Last appearance: 2 November 2007
- Introduced by: Jo Hallows
In-universe information
- Sons: Harry Thompson
- Grandsons: Isaac Thompson

Tessie Thompson, played by Sian Gibson, debuted on-screen during 1998. She was involved in storylines such as pretending to be pregnant, extortion and hiding Tony Hutchinson's (Nick Pickard) son from him for 8 years. The Sun announced her return on 17th October 2007.

Tessie and Tony begin dating and she pretends to be pregnant before she tries to scam him and take his money. She gets found out and leaves a humiliated Tony. Several years after her last appearance, "old flame" Tessie returns for Tony's 30th birthday party. Tony is "gob-smacked" to see her there and Tessie "rocks Tony's world to its foundations" when she introduces him to his long-lost son, Harry (Daniel Seymour). When she supposedly lied about her pregnancy, she was pregnant and had chosen to lie about it. Radio Times described Tessie as "slightly unhinged".

== Kevin Daniels ==
Kevin Daniels
- Hollyoaks character
- Portrayed by: Robert Weatherby
- Duration: 1998–1999
- First appearance: 12 January 1998
- Last appearance: 4 February 1999
- Introduced by: Jo Hallows

Kevin Daniels, played by Robert Weatherby, made his first appearance on 12 January 1998. Kevin is included in special Hollyoaks episodes filmed on location in Wales. The plot features several characters attempting to complete a climb in the Welsh hills. Kevin joins Rob Hawthorne (Warren Derosa), Lucy Benson (Kerrie Taylor) and Ruth Osborne (Terri Dwyer), Carol Groves (Natalie Casey) and Lewis Richardson (Ben Hull) in the episodes. The characters endure a series of dramatic events following the group being separated and getting lost, resulting in Kevin breaking his leg. Francesca Babb and Melanie Train from All About Soap branded Kevin a "nerdy" type of character.

Kevin is introduced as Rob's housemate and friend. Kevin travels to Wales with Rob, Carol, Lewis, Ruth and Lucy to complete a hill walk in aid of charity. They end up getting lost and the group become separated. The group all spend the entire night stuck in the Welsh hills awaiting rescue. Kevin breaks his leg, Rob collapses and Carol gets hypothermia but they are eventually rescued. Kurt Benson (Jeremy Edwards) later has an altercation with Kevin about Lucy's whereabouts. Kevin reveals that Rob has left in search of Jude Cunningham (Davinia Taylor).

== Kirsty Williams ==
Kirsty Williams
- Hollyoaks character
- Portrayed by: Keeley Forsyth
- First appearance: 22 January 1998
- Last appearance: 19 February 1998
- Introduced by: Jo Hallows

Kirsty Williams, played by Keeley Forsyth, is a member of the Williams family who targeted the Patrick family. Gina Patrick (Dannielle Brent) had witnessed a stabbing committed by Kirsty and was asked to testify against Kirsty in court. The Williams family targeted Gina's family, so Gina decided not to testify. Gina was arrested for failing to appear in court and ended up giving evidence.

== Jasmine Bates ==
Jasmine Bates
- Hollyoaks character
- Portrayed by: Elly Fairman
- Duration: 1998–1999
- First appearance: 21 May 1998
- Last appearance: 10 June 1999
- Introduced by: Jo Hallows

Jasmine Bates, played by Elly Fairman, first appeared in 1998 before leaving in 1999. She has a brief relationship with the new lifeguard at the college pool, Adam Morgan (David Brown). She is also part of a "controversial lesbian affair" in which she and flatmate Ruth Osborne (Terri Dwyer) kiss before having sex. The Daily Record listed them amongst "The soap stars who boosted the ratings with their shocking clinches". The Daily Record also wrote: "Wait until the TV watchdog people see this week's Hollyoaks – lesbian kissing scenes at tea-time. Phil Redmond brought you your first lesbian kiss in Brookside a good few years ago now and there was uproar. Now he's at it again in his teen-soap as a good old heart-to-heart between Jasmine and Ruth over a bottle of wine leads to something more. The next morning, Ruth is not a happy girl at all, as she regrets her night of passion with her flatmate. Oh dear. Sparks will fly."

== Vicky Green ==
D.I Vicky Green
- Hollyoaks character
- Portrayed by: Francesca Ryan (1998, 2006); Rosie Fellner (2005)
- Duration: 1998, 2005–2006
- First appearance: 4 June 1998
- Last appearance: 12 May 2006
- Introduced by: Jo Hallows (1998, 2005); David Hanson (2006)
In-universe information
- Occupation: Detective Sergeant; Detective Inspector

Detective Inspector Vicky Green, played by Francesca Ryan in 1998 and 2006 and Rosie Fellner in 2005, was a detective who investigated the disappearance of Mandy Richardson (Sarah Jayne Dunn) after she disappeared from home. Mandy's boyfriend Sol Patrick (Paul Danan) was suspected to have been involved in her disappearance, especially when Paul Millington (Zander Ward) refused to corroborate Sol's alibi that they were joyriding in a stolen car at the time. D.S. Green returned in 2005 and served as the family liaison officer when Mandy's half-brother Tom Cunningham (Ellis Hollins) went missing. He was later discovered by Mandy at her late mother and stepfather's grave. The following year, D.I. Green was called Hollyoaks following the tragic cot death of Mandy's daughter Grace Hutchinson. She questioned Mandy's husband Tony Hutchinson (Nick Pickard), Mandy, and babysitters Hannah Ashworth (Emma Rigby) and Nancy Hayton (Jessica Fox) over what had happened up to when Mandy found Grace dead.

== Rory Finnigan ==
Rory "Finn" Finnigan, played by James Redmond, first appeared in 1998 before leaving in 2002, after playing the character for 4 years. He left to return to his previous life before his time in Hollyoaks village. Rory was described as a "cheeky chancer" and a "heart-throb".

== Paul Millington ==
Paul Millington
- Hollyoaks character
- Portrayed by: Zander Ward
- Duration: 1998–2000
- First appearance: 18 June 1998
- Last appearance: 31 August 2000
- Introduced by: Jo Hallows
In-universe information
- Occupation: Labourer

Paul Millington, played by Zander Ward, first appeared in 1998 before leaving in 2000. Paul is a friend of Sol Patrick (Paul Danan) and develops feelings for Sol's sister, Gina (Dannielle Brent). However, Gina rejects him as she is a lesbian. Paul and Sol later go into business together as car washers. However, the business fails when Darren Osborne (Ashley Taylor Dawson) gets involved and they all fell out after he fires Sol. Gina convinces Paul to attend literacy classes since he cannot read or write, and he agrees on the condition that she pretends to be illiterate so that she can join him. However, she leaves part way through the class to show Paul that he does not need her with him. Paul later enrolls in an art course. When Zara Morgan (Kelly Greenwood) gains an attraction to Paul and tries to kiss him, he rejects her. Zara writes in her diary that she had had sex with Paul, which her father discovers, shoving Paul into a table with glasses. Paul temporarily loses feeling in his hand but decides against pressing charges, instead leaving the village.

== Vernon Booth ==
Vernon Booth
- Hollyoaks character
- Portrayed by: Seamus O'Neill
- Duration: 1998, 2000, 2005–2006
- First appearance: 22 June 1998
- Last appearance: 7 March 2006
- Introduced by: Jo Hallows (1998, 2000, 2005); David Hanson (2006)
In-universe information
- Occupation: Builder

Vernon Booth, played by Seamus O'Neill, was a builder who worked on Gordon Cunningham's (Bernard Latham) building on Oakdale Drive. Vernon caused problems with Mr. C's tenant Tony Hutchinson (Nick Pickard) - who owned Got It Taped - with his late arrival and behaviour that turned customers away. He was hired by Rory Finnigan (James Redmond) in August 2000 to work on building The Loft, with his girlfriend Victoria Hutchinson (Fiona Mollison) managing to talk Vernon into talking down the price. In March 2006, Vernon worked on the construction of Evissa. Tony protested against the building, believing it to be a sex shop, with Vernon embarrassing Tony before Tony was arrested.

== Eric Finnigan ==
Eric Finnigan
- Hollyoaks character
- Portrayed by: Philip Bretherton (1998); Peter Alexander (2000)
- Duration: 1998, 2000
- First appearance: 10 August 1998
- Last appearance: 18 December 2000
- Introduced by: Jo Hallows
In-universe information
- Sons: Rory Finnigan

Eric Finnigan is the father of Rory Finnigan (James Redmond). He originally appeared for five episodes in August 1998, played by Philip Bretherton and then Peter Alexander in December 2000 for Rory's wedding to Victoria Hutchinson (Fiona Mollison). When he returned, he had recently been released from prison. He arrived at Rory and Victoria's wedding drunk and ended up being thrown out after insulting Rory for marrying an older woman.

== Wayne Clark ==
Wayne Clark
- Hollyoaks character
- Portrayed by: James Corden
- Duration: 1998–1999
- First appearance: 19 November 1998
- Last appearance: 31 May 1999
- Introduced by: Jo Hallows
In-universe information
- Occupation: Janitor

Wayne Clark, played by James Corden, appeared between 1998 and 1999. Wayne was friends with Paul Millington (Zander Ward) and Sol Patrick (Paul Danan), befriending them as they worked community service for a car theft in May 1998. After leaving HCC, Wayne ran a car wash stall and employed Sol. After Sol was imprisoned for stealing a car and crashing it, Wayne closed the stall and left the village.

== Emily Taylor ==
Emily Taylor
- Hollyoaks character
- Portrayed by: Lorna Pegler
- Duration: 1998–2001
- First appearance: 7 December 1998
- Last appearance: 30 May 2001
- Introduced by: Jo Hallows

Emily Taylor, played by Lorna Pegler, first appeared in 1998, before leaving in 2001. She is the girlfriend of Gina Patrick (Dannielle Brent). Emily and Gina share an interest in animal welfare and begin a relationship together. Emily cheats on Gina so their relationship ends. Emily shares a kiss with Nikki Sullivan (Wendy Glenn), but is furious when Nikki tells her she only kissed Emily to see how kissing a woman would feel. Emily and Gina reconcile and Emily leaves with her when Gina leaves to do charity work in China.
