= List of Hollyoaks characters introduced in 1997 =

Hollyoaks is a British television soap opera that was first broadcast on 23 October 1995. The following is a list of characters that appeared in 1997, by order of first appearance. All characters were introduced by the soap's series producer, Jo Hallows. Spike was introduced in February 1997, followed by Dennis Richardson was introduced in April, followed by his wife Helen Richardson in September. Hollyoaks High headteacher John Barrington first appeared in June. The Patrick family, made up of Jill Patrick and her three children Sol Patrick, Gina Patrick and Kate Patrick, made their debuts in October and November respectively. Gordon Cunningham's cousin Benny Stringer appeared in November, and Holly Cunningham made her first appearance in December.

== Spike ==
Spike
- Hollyoaks character
- Portrayed by: Jack Deam
- First appearance: 24 February 1997
- Last appearance: 27 October 1997
- Introduced by: Jo Hallows
In-universe information
- Occupation: Builder

Spike, is played by Jack Deam. He is a builder who worked on a local construction site with Kurt Benson (Jeremy Edwards). He took a liking to Kurt's girlfriend Ruth Osborne (Terri Dwyer), but she did not reciprocate his feelings. He also homophobically attacked Bazil McCourtey (Toby Sawyer), leaving him with a serious brain injury. Spike was later caught making unwanted advances on Ruth by Kurt. Kurt attacked Spike and they fought. Spike ended up falling off the scaffolding and was impaled on a short spike. Spike went to the police and Kurt was arrested and charged with ABH and attempted murder. Spike refused to drop the charges, however at his trial, Kurt was found not guilty of all charges. Spike ended up encountering Ruth again whilst working on the repairs at Riverbank College. He attempted to force himself on Ruth, but Rob Hawthorne (Warren Derosa) managed to stop him.

== Dennis Richardson ==
Dennis Richardson
- Hollyoaks character
- Portrayed by: David McAlister
- Duration: 1997–1998, 2003
- First appearance: 14 April 1997
- Last appearance: 20 May 2003
- Introduced by: Jo Hallows
In-universe information
- Occupation: Teacher
- Wife: Helen Cunningham (until 1997)
- Sons: Lewis Richardson
- Daughters: Mandy Richardson
- Grandsons: DJ Morgan
- Granddaughters: Grace Hutchinson; Ella Richardson

Dennis Richardson, played by David McAlister, made his first appearance on 14 April 1997 as part of a "long running storyline". Mr Richardson was McAlister's biggest role at the time. Mr Richardson was introduced along with his children Lewis Richardson and Mandy Richardson and wife Helen Cunningham. He was a teacher at Hollyoaks Comprehensive School.

Dennis was featured in an issue-based story in which he sexually abused his own daughter, Mandy. Dunn told an Inside Soap reporter that "it was my first big storyline and was controversial". She recalled that McAlister was "really nice" but the story was challenging. She added that producers "trusted" them with the heavy story and they had to "work really hard". Dunn added that "this wasn't the most fun in terms of the subject, but it was really rewarding." In another interview, Dunn revealed that McAlister's acting when Dennis became violent scared her. She stated he became so convincing it helped her portray the story because she could react to him easier. Dunn concluded that "one minute we'd be smiling and chatting, the next he'd be nasty Mr Richardson." Ella Mayes of the Buckinghamshire Examiner branded the character a "baddie". While Steven Murphy of Inside Soap stated "Hollyoaks' nasty Mr Richardson. Doesn't he just make your skin crawl!" The character departed on 3 December 1998, after being found guilty of rape. He returned in April 2003 as part of the show's 1000th episode celebrations. Wendy Graniter of Inside Soap said viewers were promised some "very emotional scenes" as Mandy finally confronts Dennis.

An abusive alcoholic, he beat up Helen and Lewis and molested Mandy. When he finds out that Mandy is dating Sol Patrick, he flew into a rage and raped her. Mandy briefly ran away, and then told the police what Dennis had done to her. He was arrested and eventually found guilty of rape, for which he was sentenced to seven years' imprisonment. During his imprisonment, Lewis committed suicide. Dennis was released from prison five years later, and returned to Hollyoaks. He tried to explain himself to Mandy, but she refused to listen. Dennis then tried to mend his relationship with Helen when she took him to where Lewis's ashes had been scattered. She forgives him for what he has done. Mandy arrived with Tony Hutchinson, Helen's husband Gordon Cunningham and his son Max Cunningham to get rid of Dennis, and a fight broke out between Max and Dennis. Dennis was last seen telling Mandy that he is dying of cancer, hoping she might forgive him. She bought him some alcohol to quicken his death, telling him she could never forgive him. He would die of liver disease. He is cremated, and Mandy pours his ashes down the drain.

== John Berrington ==
John Berrington
- Hollyoaks character
- Portrayed by: Keith Ladd (1997); Richard Avery (2000)
- Duration: 1997, 2000
- First appearance: 2 June 1997
- Last appearance: 19 April 2000
- Introduced by: Jo Hallows
In-universe information
- Occupation: Headteacher

John Berrington, played by Keith Ladd in 1997 and Richard Avery in 2000, was the headteacher at Hollyoaks High School. In June 1997, Mr. Berrington called Mandy Richardson (Sarah Jayne Dunn) and Cindy Cunningham (Stephanie Waring) into his office after learning of their scam fundraiser for a supposed "donkey sanctuary". In April 2000, Mr. Berrington brought Andy Morgan (Ross Davidson) and Sue Morgan (Eve White) to the school to discuss teacher Ms. Riley's accusations of their daughter Zara Morgan (Kelly Greenwood) stealing from her. He threatened Zara with expulsion and removed her from the mural design project in her art class. The young woman took revenge by setting the mural ablaze, which ended up spreading around the art room. Mr. Berrington was mentioned to still be the headteacher in December 2002, when Sally Hunter (Katherine Dow Blyton) discussed Brian Drake's (Jonathan Le Billon) punishment for the abusive text messages sent to her daughter Lisa Hunter (Gemma Atkinson).

== Helen Cunningham ==
Helen Cunningham, played by Kathryn George, first appeared on 8 September 1997. The character was written out in 2004 when she was killed in a car crash. Helen is the mother of Mandy Richardson (Sarah Jayne Dunn), Lewis Richardson (Ben Hull) and Tom Cunningham (Ellis Hollins). Helen and her husband, Gordon Cunningham (Bernard Latham) were deemed mainstays of Hollyoaks prior to the pair being "notoriously killed off". The pair were both centre of a tribute made by Tom in 2020, where he thanks them for making the Hollyoaks village his home.

== O.B. ==
Sam "O.B." O'Brien, played by Darren Jeffries, made his first appearance on 6 October 1997. Jeffries become one of the show's longest-standing cast members. Along with Matt Littler (Max Cunningham), Jeffries was nominated twice for the Best On-screen Partnership accolade at the British Soap Awards. After ten years on the show, Jeffries announced his departure in November 2007, as he wanted "new challenges". His final scenes aired on 26 February 2008, as OB leaves Hollyoaks to be with his girlfriend Summer Shaw (Summer Strallen).

== Jill Patrick ==
Jill Patrick
- Hollyoaks character
- Portrayed by: Lynda Rooke
- Duration: 1997–2000
- First appearance: 30 October 1997
- Last appearance: 24 October 2000
- Introduced by: Jo Hallows
In-universe information
- Occupation: Barmaid
- Husband: Jack Osborne
- Sons: Joe Patrick
- Daughters: Kate Patrick
- Adoptive sons: Sol Patrick
- Adoptive daughters: Gina Patrick
- Stepsons: Darren Osborne
- Stepdaughters: Ruth Osborne; Bethany Cunningham

Jill Osborne (also Patrick), played by Lynda Rooke, made her first appearance on 30 October 1997. She appeared until 2000.

She begins working at The Dog in the Pond as a barmaid, and is soon joined by her children Kate, Gina and Sol Patrick. She and Jack Osborne, her boss, begin a relationship, eventually getting married. The marriage goes well, despite a feud between the Patrick children and Jack's children Ruth and Darren Osborne. Sol and Gina discover that they are not Jill's biological children. Gina goes missing and Sol and Jill go looking for her in a car he has stolen. He crashes it, almost killing Jill. He spends time in a Young Offenders Institute, and eventually forgives Jill for hiding the truth from him for so long. Jill is devastated to find out she has a brain tumour and later informs her family. She makes Jack agree to look after her children when she dies. Jill dies of her illness and Jack keeps his promise and cares for her children, helping Sol flee from the police abroad. Gina later leaves Hollyoaks to live in China and work at an orphanage to make Jill proud.

In 2017, Jack mentioned this to his late wife Frankie (Helen Pearson) about his marriage with Jill and her death, she spoke to Nancy saying it was his second time losing his wife since Jill and mentioned how he was devastated by her death.

The Daily Record commented on the character's death saying "When there's a problem with a character in Hollyoaks, they just kill them off." They further commented saying "Remember Jill? Gina and Sol's mum with the Noel Gallagher eyebrows and bottle blonde hair? Well, she's dying. Yep, as if the Patrick kids haven't gone through enough - finding out their mum wasn't really their mum, etc, now she's going to die on them. She turns up at the Dog and tells Jack that he's going to have to look after the kids, so now not only does he have Ruth, but this motley crew to look after too." Due to her role as Jill, Guy Henderson from InYourArea referred to the actress as a "Hollyoaks favourite".

== Sol Patrick ==
Sol Patrick, portrayed by Paul Danan, made his first appearance on 3 November 1997. Danan graduated from Italia Conti Academy of Theatre Arts, where he shared classes with Natasha Symms and Dannielle Brent, who went on to play his character's sisters Kate Patrick and Gina Patrick. The trio shared a house in Liverpool after they were cast in Hollyoaks. Danan was grateful for his "big break", stating "There's so many actors out there and not much work all the time, it's very hard, so I think I'm really lucky to have this."

Sol is the show's "resident bad boy" with a history of homelessness, a stint in a Young Offender Institution, and a temperament that causes him trouble. Describing Sol, Dawn Collinson of the Liverpool Echo wrote "With his bad lad reputation and close-cropped moody look, Hollyoaks' Sol Patrick is quite a handful." She noted that without his character's trademark clothing and attitude, Danan was much warmer. He told Collinson that his character "stresses too much", where as he was a more chilled and loving person. Collinson observed that since his introduction to Hollyoaks, Danan had been dubbed a "heartthrob" and was popular with female viewers. Danan admitted that the fan mail gave him confidence, saying I wouldn't really want to date a fan because me and Sol are two separate people, but reading some of the letters really brings me back up if I'm feeling down."

For the cliffhanger final episode of 2000, Sol and his girlfriend Jess Holt (Frankie Hough) were trapped by a fire "in the Hollyoaks local". Wendy Granditer of Inside Soap observed that Sol's life "has been turned upside down" since he began a relationship with Jess. The character's final episode aired on 5 April 2001, following a storyline in which Sol is falsely accused of trying to kill Jess' brother Steve Holt (Conor Ryan). A writer for Virgin Media said Sol ended up "fleeing the area for his own good". Danan found the scenes in which Sol confides in his former stepfather Jack Osborne (Jimmy McKenna) to be "really touching" and said he and McKenna cried for real. Danan also explained to Granditer that the final shot had to be filmed multiple times to get it right and he felt that it would never end. His leaving party was held that same night and then he returned to London. Danan was happy with his exit storyline, saying "It was great that they left it open rather than killing him off. Sol didn't kill anyone, or commit any crime, all he did was protect his girlfriend, so there's no reason why he can't return one day."

== Kate Patrick ==
Kate Patrick, played by Natasha Symms, made her first appearance on 6 November 1997. Dannielle Brent originally auditioned for the role, before she was cast as Kate's sister Gina Patrick. During her time with the show, Symms lived with Brent and Paul Danan, who played her character's siblings Gina and Sol Patrick. Kate lived with her mother, siblings and stepfather at The Dog in the Pond public house. She was billed as "bright, independent, superstitious." Vicky Spavin of the Daily Record dubbed Kate "the Patrick family's most dysfunctional member." Following her return in 2000, a reporter for the Daily Record called the character a "bitch" and commented "Yes, Kate Patrick is back, and she's mixing it as much as she ever was." That same year, the character was included in a Coventry Evening Telegraph feature about soap characters "viewers love to hate".

The character became known as a "predatory maneater" during her time in the show. Symms stated "I'm a bit of a femme fatale, as they call it. I've managed to wreck about two marriages, one being the main married couple of the show. It's a brilliant character. She unfortunately gets rather obsessed with the married men and she goes a bit nutty." Symms stressed that she was not at all similar to Kate in real life, but she enjoyed playing a character who was very different to herself. Symms received some verbal abuse from younger fans when her character came between popular couple Kurt Benson (Jeremy Edwards) and Ruth Osborne (Terri Dwyer). She thought she would receive hate mail because Kurt and Ruth were big characters, but she actually received letters telling her Kurt and Kate made for a better couple.

== Benny Stringer ==
Benny Stringer
- Hollyoaks character
- Portrayed by: Matthew Morgan
- Duration: 1997–1998
- First appearance: 17 November 1997
- Last appearance: 30 November 1998
In-universe information
- First cousins: Gordon Cunningham
- Other relatives: Dawn Cunningham; Jude Cunningham; Cindy Cunningham; Max Cunningham; Tom Cunningham; Bethany Cunningham; Holly Cunningham; Alfie Nightingale; Hilton Cunningham; Steph Cunningham-Lomax

Benny Stringer, played by Matthew Morgan, is introduced as the cousin of Gordon Cunningham (Bernard Latham). Struggling with debts, Gordon's daughter Jude Cunningham (Davinia Taylor) began getting involved in Benny's dodgy deals, stealing cars for him. After taking a loan from him, Jude struggled with the repayments and Benny tried to convince her to make him a partner. After Jude's boyfriend Lewis Richardson (Ben Hull) became suspicious of Benny, Benny ended up telling him all about their activities. After Lewis broke up with her as a result, Jude threatened to go to the police, with Benny retaliating by trashing her restaurant Parker's. Jude's financial struggles continued so Benny arranged for her to marry his friend Roger Patterson in a sham ceremony at Burcroft Manor. However, the deal went disastrously when Jude was caught switching Lady Greythorne's necklace with a fake, forcing her to go on the run. Benny has not been mentioned since.

== Gina Patrick ==
Gina Patrick, played by Dannielle Brent, made her first appearance on 20 November 1997. She was introduced as part of the "dysfunctional" Patrick family. Brent originally auditioned for the role of Gina's sister Kate Patrick, before she joined the show. In 2000, she told Vicky Spavin of the Daily Record that she still thought she was more like Kate than Gina. However, she acknowledged that had she won the role, she would have had to leave the show. She commented "It turned out quite a lot better for me." Brent was only supposed to be in the show for a short stint, but she was later promoted to the regular cast. Gina is a tomboy, who often wears combat trousers and nose rings. One of the character's biggest storylines saw her come out as a lesbian after kissing her friend Emily Taylor (Lorna Pegler). Brent and Pegler, who were real best friends, planned the kiss between their characters for two months. Of the couple, Brent stated: "Gina and Emily are quite different characters. Emily is stylish, whereas Gina is like a female Swampy. They share a passion for animal welfare." She also said that she and Pegler portrayed the relationship like "any other couple together". The relationship causes problems between Gina and her brother Sol Patrick (Paul Danan), as he feels that she intentionally kept her sexuality a secret.

== Holly Cunningham ==
Holly Cunningham made her first appearance during the episode broadcast on 22 December 1997. She is the daughter of Cindy Cunningham (Stephanie Waring), who gives birth to her on Christmas Day. She was initially played by an infant actor called Chloe. An early storyline for the character saw her swallow an ecstasy tablet, leading Cindy to flee the country with her to avoid her being taken by social services. Holly was reintroduced in 2008 with Lydia Waters cast in the role. Waters was cast after going through several rounds of auditions. Holly was billed as "quite a stroppy ten-year-old who knows her own mind – like her mum's character." Wallis Day took over the role in November 2012. Daniel Kilkelly of Digital Spy reported that the now 14-year-old initially appears to be "well-mannered and sophisticated", but her "true bratty nature is soon revealed." Day reprised the role in sixth season of late night spin-off Hollyoaks Later in 2013. That same year, the character was recast again to Amanda Clapham.
