= List of Hollyoaks characters introduced in 1995–1996 =

The following is a list of characters who first appeared in the Channel 4 soap opera Hollyoaks between 1995 and 1996, by order of first appearance. Hollyoaks is a long-running Channel 4 soap opera in the United Kingdom. 1995 was the first year for the soap and saw the introduction of several original characters. This period also saw the introduction of families such as the Cunningham family, the Osborne family, the Benson family and Andersen family.

== Kurt Benson ==
Kurt Benson, played by Jeremy Edwards, was one of seven original teen characters created for the show. He debuted on-screen during the episode airing on 23 October 1995 and was the first character seen on screen. He was created by Phil Redmond. He stayed on the show until he left in 1999 when he and girlfriend Ruth Osborne (Terri Dwyer) split up. The character was later killed off screen in a jet ski accident. As part of the celebrations for Hollyoaks' 25th anniversary, Edwards reprised the role, with the onscreen explanation being that Kurt had faked his death and had been on the run for the past 20 years. He remained in the series for three months after his return. On being asked to return again, Edwards declined, stating that negative comments made about him on social media influenced his decision.

== Ollie Benson ==
Ollie Benson
- Hollyoaks character
- Portrayed by: Paul Leyshon
- Duration: 1995–1997
- First appearance: 23 October 1995
- Last appearance: 16 October 1997
- Created by: Phil Redmond
- Introduced by: Phil Redmond
In-universe information
- Occupation: Journalist
- Father: Kirk Benson
- Mother: Julie Benson
- Brothers: Kurt Benson
- Sisters: Lucy Benson

Ollie Benson, played by Paul Leyshon, appeared from 1995 to 1997. Making his debut in the first episode, he departed two years later when the character died in a road accident. The character's death occurred as part of a new "radical" direction for the serial, as it sought to tackle "tougher issues" on-screen. The car crash storyline aired over four consecutive nights and saw both Ollie and Lee "Stan" Stanley (Nathan Valente) involved in a head-on collision, after a drunken Stan takes Ollie on "a nightmare drive".

Ollie is the youngest of Benson children and the brother of Kurt Benson (Jeremy Edwards) and Lucy Benson (Kerrie Taylor). Ollie works as a journalist for the Riverbank Review, where he instigates seminal reports including Babe of the Month and Cleavage of the Year. Ollie's best friend is Lee "Stan" Stanley and even after Ollie exposes a scandal of Stan's, Ollie remains best friends with him. Ollie has sex with Mandy Richardson (Sarah Jayne Dunn), not discovering until later that she is fifteen and facing a statutory rape charge. Ollie tries to stop Stan in his car for driving too fast until Stan loses control of the car and a lorry reverses down the road, with Stan having no time to brake. Ollie suffers injuries and is rushed to hospital with his family beside him. After a week, both Ollie and Stan die in hospital.

== Julie Matthews ==
Julie Matthews, played by Julie Buckfield, appeared from the first episode in 1995 and left in 1997. She made brief returns in 2002 and 2007. She then made a surprise return that aired on 19 and 20 September 2018. She is the girlfriend of Tony Hutchinson and later gets engaged to him but leaves him at the altar. When Julie returns in 2002, she is given a job at Gnosh Village by Tony. He tells her he wants to be with her but she reveals that she only wants him so she could steal his money for her boyfriend who is in prison and leaves. When Tony turns thirty, Tina Reilly (Leah Hackett) throws a surprise party and invites everyone in his address book. Julie arrives and tries to make amends but Tony sends her away.

In 2018, Tony stays at Julie's for two months while coming to terms with his daughter's illness. Following the character's surprise return, Chris Edwards from Digital Spy noted that fans "got quite the shock" yet "were treated" to Julie's return. Fans expressed their surprise on Twitter at seeing the character again.

== Sarah Andersen ==
Sarah Andersen
- Hollyoaks character
- Portrayed by: Anna Martland
- Duration: 1995–1996
- First appearance: 23 October 1995
- Last appearance: 4 March 1996
- Created by: Phil Redmond
- Introduced by: Phil Redmond
In-universe information
- Occupation: Barmaid
- Father: Greg Andersen
- Mother: Jane Andersen
- Sisters: Natasha Andersen
- Grandfathers: Bert Andersen
- Grandmothers: Beryl Andersen
- Aunts: Celia Osborne
- First cousins: Ruth Osborne; Darren Osborne (adoptive)
- Other relatives: Jack Osborne (adoptive); Oscar Osborne (adoptive); Francine Osborne (adoptive)

Sarah Andersen, played by Anna Martland, was introduced as part of the Andersen family. In the first episode of the series, Sarah accompanies friend Julie Matthews (Julie Buckfield) to Ollie Benson's (Paul Leyshon) house. They go joyriding in Kurt Benson's (Jeremy Edwards) car and go to hospital. Following her sister Natasha's (Shebah Ronay) death, Sarah leaves to live in the United States with her parents.

== Natasha Andersen ==
Natasha Andersen, played by Shebah Ronay, was one of seven original teen characters created for the show. She debuted on-screen during the first episode, which airedon 23 October 1995. She was created by Phil Redmond as one of the serial's original characters and stayed in the show until nearly six months later when she died on 11 March 1996. Her death was prompted after producers made the decision to have a hard-hitting storyline due to critics feeling that the show lacked edge. The storyline involved Natasha dying from the use of drugs.

== Dawn Cunningham ==
Dawn Cunningham, played by Lisa Williamson, was one of seven original teen characters created for the show. She appeared on the first episode on 23 October 1995. She left in 1997 when the character dies on Christmas Day from leukemia.

== Gordon Cunningham ==
Gordon Hilton Cunningham (commonly referred to as Mr. C), appeared in the serial's first episode airing on 23 October 1995 played by an uncredited walk-on actor and later played by Bernard Latham who made his first appearance on 25 March 1996. He left in 2004 when the character died of a heart attack after being involved in a car crash. He briefly returned in 2008 in a dream sequence.

== Angela Cunningham ==
Angela Cunningham
- Hollyoaks character
- Portrayed by: Liz Stooke
- Duration: 1995–1999, 2004, 2006, 2008
- First appearance: 23 October 1995
- Last appearance: 10 July 2008
- Created by: Phil Redmond
- Introduced by: Phil Redmond (1995); Jo Hallows (2004); Bryan Kirkwood (2006, 2008)
In-universe information
- Other names: Angela Williams
- Family: Cunningham
- Husband: Gordon Cunningham (until 1994); Terry Williams (1996–)
- Sons: Max Cunningham
- Daughters: Dawn Cunningham; Jude Cunningham; Cindy Cunningham
- Grandsons: Alfie Nightingale; Hilton Cunningham; Maddox Keane
- Granddaughters: Bethany Cunningham; Holly Cunningham

Angela Cunningham (also Williams) is the ex-wife of Gordon Cunningham, and mother of Max Cunningham, Jude Cunningham, Cindy Cunningham and Dawn Cunningham. Since her first and last appearances as a regular character in 1995 and 1999, Angela has made several guest appearances in 2004, 2006 and 2008. She married her boyfriend, Terry Williams in the first ever marriage on the show.

When Hollyoaks began, Angela and Gordon were already divorced, but Angela tried to play a part in the complicated lives of Max, Jude, Cindy and Dawn, including Cindy's teenage pregnancy and Dawn's death from leukemia in 1997. Angela returned for Gordon's funeral in 2004, Max's wedding to Clare Devine in 2006, and again for his wedding to Steph Dean in 2008. When the ceremony finished, Gordon son Tom Cunningham was playing on the road when a car was coming, Max moved Tom on the pavement but he was struck by a car and was killed, and Angela's last appearance was attending Max's funeral.

She was mentioned in February 2010 when Cindy's daughter Holly Cunningham went missing, but she didn't return. In 2016, Cindy later called her, and was happy that Jude returned to the village.

== Tony Hutchinson ==
Anthony "Tony" Hutchinson is a fictional character from the British Channel 4 soap opera Hollyoaks, played by Nick Pickard. He was one of seven original teen characters created for the show. Tony first appeared on-screen on 23 October 1995, the first episode of the series. The character was created by Phil Redmond as one of several main characters for the soap opera and since then has been part of various different storylines including an affair with Helen Cunningham (Kathryn George), the death of his daughter to sudden infant death syndrome and sleeping with underage Theresa McQueen (Jorgie Porter). Tony was the first character to speak on the series.

== Terry Williams ==
Terry Williams
- Hollyoaks character
- Portrayed by: Ian Puleston-Davies
- Duration: 1995–1996
- First appearance: 23 October 1995
- Last appearance: 7 November 1996
- Created by: Phil Redmond
- Introduced by: Phil Redmond
In-universe information
- Brothers: Vinnie Williams
- Wife: Angela Cunningham (1996–)
- Stepsons: Max Cunningham
- Stepdaughters: Dawn Cunningham; Jude Cunningham; Cindy Cunningham

Terry Williams is a fictional character on the long-running Channel 4 British television soap opera Hollyoaks. He was played by Ian Puleston-Davies and appeared in the first ever episode on 23 October 1995 before leaving in October 1996, a year after the character first appeared. He was the boyfriend of Angela Cunningham and when he married her he was part of the first ever marriage on the show. He had a continuous feud with Dawn and Jude Cunningham. He rented them his flat but later moved his brother in to annoy them. He later left leaving Angela in debts of over £55,000. In 2005, Max went to visit him for three days, he mentions this to his friend OB that Terry was doing well, and was still strong with his relationship with his mother. In 2008, he couldn't attend his stepson Max funeral. The Independent described him as the "toyboy" of Dawn's mother.

== Jambo Bolton ==
James "Jambo" Bolton is a fictional character from the British Channel 4 soap opera Hollyoaks, played by Will Mellor. He was one of seven original teen characters created for the show. He first appeared in 1995 in the first ever episode airing 23 October 1995, before leaving in 1998. In 2004, Mellor reprised his role briefly for a special Christmas episode.

== Lucy Benson ==
Lucy Benson is a fictional character from the long-running Channel 4 soap opera Hollyoaks, played by Kerrie Taylor between 1995–2000 and appeared in the shows first ever episode airing on 23 October 1995. The character left five years later when she went travelling.

== Greg Andersen ==
Greg Andersen
- Hollyoaks character
- Portrayed by: Alvin Stardust
- Duration: 1995–1996
- First appearance: 23 October 1995
- Last appearance: 12 February 1996
- Created by: Phil Redmond
- Introduced by: Phil Redmond
In-universe information
- Occupation: Landlord
- Father: Bert Andersen
- Mother: Beryl Andersen
- Sisters: Celia Osborne
- Wife: Jane Andersen
- Daughters: Natasha Andersen; Sarah Andersen
- Nephews: Darren Osborne (adoptive)
- Nieces: Ruth Osborne

Greg Andersen was played by Alvin Stardust from 1995 to 1996. He was introduced as part of the Andersen family and the father of original character Natasha, the husband of Jane Andersen, father of Sarah Andersen and brother of Celia Osborne. He first appeared in 1995 as the landlord of The Dog in the Pond and was the first landlord of the longstanding pub which currently survives today and has been the centre of many storylines. After Natasha died he sold the pub to Celia and her husband Jack Osborne and went back to the United States with Jane and Sarah. In 2005, Jack invited him, Jane and Sarah to his wedding with Frankie, however he and Jane couldn't attend due to flight comments, while Sarah had work conflicts.

In 2013, it was revealed that Greg was not Darren's uncle. In 2016, Jack's son Darren Osborne and his wife Nancy Osborne went to visit him, Jane and Sarah for a while.

== Bazil McCourtey ==
Bazz
- Hollyoaks character
- Portrayed by: Toby Sawyer
- Duration: 1995–1997
- First appearance: 23 October 1995
- Last appearance: December 1997
- Created by: Phil Redmond
- Introduced by: Phil Redmond

Bazil "Bazz" McCourtey was played by Toby Sawyer. He first appeared in the first episode of the series, airing on 23 October 1995, before leaving 3 years later. He was the friend of Tony Hutchinson, Jambo Bolton and Kurt Benson. He was a DJ and a musician who was part of the band the Crazy Bazz Studs with Lucy Benson and Carol Groves. He was also part of a band with Kurt, Jambo and Tony and tried to get his song played while at clubs in Ibiza while on holiday. He briefly dated Lucy but later came out as gay. The Chester Chronicle described him as "fun-loving", "quirky" and "party guy DJ Bazz" and who "turned up in his van". The Daily Record described him as "awful" and said after his exit that they thought it "was safe to turn my TV set on again".

== Louise Taylor ==
Louise Taylor, played by Brett O'Brien, made her first appearance on 23 October 1995 and is one of the show's original characters. O'Brien was cast as Louise in 1996, she was born in Dublin and Louise was her first television role.. She attended numerous auditions to secure the role. Actress Julie Buckfield also read for the part of Louise in her original audition but she was cast as Julie Matthews instead. Louise is introduced as one of the show's seven core characters.

The character's outline publicised in British media ahead of her debut revealed that Louise is portrayed as a good friend. Her other personality traits include being "loyal, trustworthy, honest, generous" and a strange interest in things associated with the supernatural. In the book, Phil Redmond's Hollyoaks: The Official Companion, Matthew Evans described Louise as an "Earth mother" and a "hopeless romantic, causing her friends no end of trouble in her pursuit of the 'perfect' man." O'Brien told a Liverpool Echo reporter that she was "not like" Louise apart from them both being Irish. O'Brien plays Louise using her own Dublin accent and she told Murphy that "I think producers were keen to have an Irish person in the cast. O'Brien was aged twenty-five when she received the role, but Louise is portrayed as a seventeen-year-old. Writers also developed a female friendship group consisting of Louise, Maddie Parker (Yasmin Bannerman), Natasha Andersen (Shebah Ronay), Dawn Cunningham (Lisa Williamson).

Writers developed a relationship storyline between Louise and Kurt Benson (Jeremy Edwards). The duo become closer after her split with Joe but they too break-up after Louise refuses to have sex with him. In another storyline, writers introduced a "handsome guy", Dermot Ashton (Lauren Beales), who offers to help Louise organise the college revue and she develops an interest in him. O'Brien left the role in 1996 after only eight months in the role and Louise's departure storyline featured her moving away with a traveller.

== Maddie Parker ==
Madeline "Maddie" Parker is a fictional character from the Channel 4 soap opera Hollyoaks, a long-running serial drama about life in a fictional suburb of Chester. She was one of seven original teen characters created for the show. She was played by actress Yasmin Bannerman between 1995 and 1997. Maddie was created by screenwriter Phil Redmond. She made her debut in the soap on 23 October 1995, and remained for one year and six months with Bannerman making her final appearance on 10 March 1997.

== Juliette Benson ==
Juliette Benson
- Hollyoaks character
- Portrayed by: Martine Brown
- Duration: 1995–1999
- First appearance: 30 October 1995
- Last appearance: 10 May 1999
- Created by: Phil Redmond
- Introduced by: Phil Redmond
In-universe information
- Husband: Kirk Benson
- Sons: Kurt Benson; Ollie Benson
- Daughters: Lucy Benson

Juliette Benson was the mother of Kurt, Lucy and Ollie Benson, and wife of Kirk Benson. She left Hollyoaks with her husband, Kirk, after their children did not need them any more as Kurt and Lucy moved out.

== Kirk Benson ==
Kirk Benson
- Hollyoaks character
- Portrayed by: James Quinn
- Duration: 1995–1999
- First appearance: 11 December 1995
- Last appearance: 10 May 1999
- Created by: Phil Redmond
- Introduced by: Phil Redmond
In-universe information
- Wife: Juliette Benson
- Sons: Kurt Benson; Ollie Benson
- Daughters: Lucy Benson

Kirk Benson was the father of Kurt, Lucy and Ollie Benson, and husband of Juliette Benson. He owned his own computer business and left Hollyoaks with his wife Juliette, after their children did not need them any more, due to Kurt and Lucy moving out and Ollie's death.

== Lewis Richardson ==
Lewis Richardson, played by Ben Hull. Lewis was introduced by Phil Redmond as part of the Richardson family. Lewis made his first on-screen appearance on 6 November 1995 before departing on 15 October 2001. Hull had heard of the serial and believed it had enormous potential, really wanted to be part of it. He described hearing of his casting as a "such a wonderful feeling". Hull quit the role in 2001. Hull said that he felt it was "time to do other things" adding that he was "very proud of Hollyoaks and what we've done with it". Hull added that "playing Lewis has been a wonderful experience. It's been hard work, but well worth it". Hull said that he quit because "I'd go home after filming and feel incredibly depressed, playing such a tormented and depressed character was exhausting". Hull admitted he had reservations after quitting the role and questioned if he had made the right decision. On his character's decision to commit suicide Ben Hull said "Lewis's greatest fear was that one day he would become like his father, alcoholic and abusive - and he has."

== Max Cunningham ==
Max Cunningham was originally played by Ben Sheriff from 1995 to 1997, when the role was recast to Matt Littler. In 2008 Max, along with Tony Hutchinson was the longest-running character in the serial. In May 2008, Littler decided to leave and his final scenes were broadcast in July of that year. The character died shortly after marrying Steph Cunningham, being run over by a car after pushing Tom Cunningham out of the way.

== Cindy Cunningham ==
Cynthia "Cindy" Cunningham (previously Hutchinson and Longford), made her first appearance in December 1995. Originally played by Hayley Fairclough, the role was recast twice in 1996, initially to Laura Crossley. Stephanie Waring took over in November of that year until 2000, and made guest appearances in 2002 and 2004 before reprising the role full-time from June 2008. Waring took a break for maternity leave in 2010, returning on 9 March 2011.

Cindy is the youngest daughter of Gordon (Bernard Latham) and Angela Cunningham (Liz Stooke).

== Aunt Rose ==
Aunt Rose
- Hollyoaks character
- Portrayed by: Meg Johnson
- Duration: 1995–96
- First appearance: 18 December 1995
- Last appearance: 23 December 1996
- Introduced by: Phil Redmond
In-universe information
- Husband: Arthur
- Other relatives: Juliette Benson; Kurt Benson; Ollie Benson; Lucy Benson

Aunt Rose, played by Meg Johnson, is a relative of Juliette Benson (Martine Brown).

== Jane Andersen ==
Jane Andersen
- Hollyoaks character
- Portrayed by: Sally Faulkner
- First appearance: 1 January 1996
- Last appearance: 25 March 1996
- Introduced by: Phil Redmond
In-universe information
- Occupation: Landlady
- Husband: Greg Andersen
- Daughters: Natasha Andersen; Sarah Andersen

Jane Andersen is a fictional character on the long-running Channel 4 British television soap opera Hollyoaks. She was introduced as part of the Andersen family and the mother of original character Natasha, the wife of Greg Andersen and mother of Sarah Andersen. She was the first Landlady of The Dog in the Pond which went on to be a centre focus for the show and still exists today. After Natasha died, Jane was distraught and at the end of March 1996, Jane went back to the United States with her parents, Greg and Sarah.

== Lee Stanley ==
Lee Stanley
- Hollyoaks character
- Portrayed by: Nathan Valente
- Duration: 1996–1997
- First appearance: 1 January 1996
- Last appearance: 9 October 1997
- Introduced by: Phil Redmond
In-universe information
- Mother: Sheila Stanley
- Daughters: Holly Cunningham

Lee "Stan" Stanley was a cafeteria worker at Hollyoaks Community College, who befriended teenager Ollie Benson.

Stan appeared as the sidekick of Ollie Benson in 1996. Stan's life took a dramatic change when he found out that he was the father of Cindy Cunningham's child, Holly, after the pair had a one-night stand on her sixteenth birthday. Stan offered to stand by Cindy throughout the pregnancy but was cruelly rejected. Depressed, Stan began drinking heavily at The Dog. Ollie did his best to try to snap Stan out of his depression but it was no good, as Stan got in his car and started to drive at a dangerous speed. Ollie's warnings fell on deaf ears as the drunken Stan had careered into a reversing lorry, crashing and seriously injuring the pair. Both lay in a critical condition for a week in hospital, where they later died, leaving his girlfriend Cindy devastated, and becoming the single mother to Holly. The Daily Record commented on the character's death saying "When there's a problem with a character in Hollyoaks, they just kill them off."

== Ruth Osborne ==
Ruth Osborne (also Benson), played by Terri Dwyer, first appeared in January 1996 before leaving in 2001. Dwyer later made several guest appearances, most recently in 2008. Ruth is the daughter of Jack and Celia Osborne and the half-sister of Darren Osborne.

== Dermot Ashton ==
Dermot Ashton
- Hollyoaks character
- Portrayed by: Lauren Beales
- First appearance: 5 February 1996
- Last appearance: 11 November 1996
- Introduced by: Phil Redmond

Dermot Ashton is a fictional character on the long-running Channel 4 British television soap opera Hollyoaks. He was played by actor Lauren Beales in 1996 and left when the character died in a car accident. Dermot was best friends with Rob Hawthorne and was generally known as Rob's spineless sidekick.

Dermot appeared as the friend of villain Rob Hawthorne in early 1996. He took Natasha Andersen to Lucy Benson's 18th birthday where he and Rob spiked Natasha's drink with a tablet in an attempt to rape her. This led to Natashas death and Rob felt guilty over what had happened. Later in the year, Dermot began having trouble with money so he asked Rob to help him. They decided to raid Dermot's dealers lockup and use the money to help Dermot with his financial trouble. They brought Lucy Benson and Carol Groves with them as alibis. While raiding the lockup, the dealer caught them in the act and a car chase ensued. Dermot tried to ditch the money out of the car window but Rob, who was driving, tried to stop him. Rob lost control of the car and they plunged into the River Dee. Rob, Lucy and Carol survived but Dermot was killed instantly.

== Jude Cunningham ==
Jude Cunningham
- Hollyoaks character
- Portrayed by: Davinia Taylor
- Duration: 1996–1998, 2016
- First appearance: 18 March 1996
- Last appearance: 3 November 2016
- Introduced by: Phil Redmond (1996); Bryan Kirkwood (2016)
- Spin-off appearances: Hollyoaks: Off on One (1998)
In-universe information
- Other names: Mrs Windsor-Davenport
- Occupation: Property developer
- Family: Cunningham
- Father: Gordon Cunningham
- Mother: Angela Cunningham
- Stepfather: Terry Williams
- Brothers: Max Cunningham
- Sisters: Dawn Cunningham; Cindy Cunningham
- Half-brothers: Tom Cunningham
- Nephews: Hilton Cunningham; Alfie Nightingale; Maddox Keane
- Nieces: Bethany Cunningham; Holly Cunningham; Steph Cunningham-Lomax

Judith "Jude" Cunningham is played by Davinia Taylor. She joined the show as part of the Cunningham family. The Daily Record said she was a "Favourite" for being the "saucy Jude Cunningham, who had Lewis well and truly wrapped around her taloned finger". They added that she was "good old Jude" who caused "no end of trouble". Taylor was axed in October 1998 for timekeeping but alleged that she was to quit at the end of the year before being axed. On 26 May 2016, it was announced that Jude would be returning in the summer and she returned on 3 October 2016. Jude left the series again a month later on 3 November 2016.

Jude tried to blackmail Jack Osborne (Jimmy McKenna) about being the father of her sister Dawn's child, but instead she ended up getting drunk and telling everyone at The Dog public house. She led a colourful life, battling with drink and crippling debts. Jude seemed to be never short of luck, and yet something invariably seemed to go wrong with her fortune and life happily ever after. Jude began life in Hollyoaks studying fashion at Riverbank College but her academic life was short-lived, as she was thrown off her course for cheating. After this, she struggled to meet ends and, due to her irresponsible attitude towards money, was declared bankrupt and left with massive debts to clear. As Jude became increasingly desperate for money, she began working as an escort, but finally gave up after a few bad experiences with clients. Just as Jude began to get her life back together, tragedy struck when her sister Dawn (Lisa Williamson) died of leukaemia. Jude took the news badly, turning to drink to get her through the difficult times. The love of Jude's life was Lewis Richardson (Ben Hull), but he split up with her after he grew tired of her lies.

When her father Gordon's criminal cousin Benny arrived on the scene, Jude soon hooked up with him and started stealing cars to order. As she finally managed to pay off her debts, she bought Parker's and it seemed as if life was starting to get better for her. As always, this was short lived for Jude as she struggled to repay Benny what she owned him. Things turned nasty when Benny trashed Parker's and, to cover her losses, Jude began making illegal booze trips to France. However, this still did not bring enough money for the final instalment to buy her beloved Parker's. Desperate to make a success of her business, Jude agreed to do one last job for Benny. She had to pretend to get married so that Benny could snatch an expensive piece of jewellery stored at a stately home. Unsurprisingly, the plan went wrong and Jude was left as the number one suspect. She was days away from being arrested by the police and had to come up with a quick plan. A desperate Jude had no choice but to leave Hollyoaks. She brought a dark wig, took Dawn's passport, and bid farewell to her surviving sister, Cindy (Stephanie Waring) before leaving forever.

In 2002, Max, Gordon, Helen, Tom, Cindy, Holly, Angela and O.B. went to visit Jude for three days. In 2003, Max and Gordon went to visit her for four days, for her wedding to Damien Windsor. Jude is unable to attend her father's funeral in 2004 and Max's funeral in 2008 to avoid being arrested, although she had contacted Max to congratulate him for his wedding to Steph Dean (Carley Stenson), which occurred on the day of his death. In August 2013, Cindy mentions that her daughter Holly (Amanda Clapham) has gone to stay with Jude for a few days, but her current location is not revealed. In November 2013, Cindy mentions to Dirk Savage (David Kennedy) that how Jude was hidden in her location, since she was wanted in Hollyoaks to avoid going to prison. In 2016, Cindy went to visit Jude, after learning Alfie Nightingale (Richard Linnell) was the son she had given up for adoption years ago.

In October 2016, Jude returns under the name of "Mrs. Windsor Davenport", after having a meeting with Marnie Nightingale (Lysette Anthony) over the houses that she is building, called Royal Oakes. Jude is furious when Marnie insults Cindy and when Cindy arrives, she reveals herself as Cindy's sister, which backfires on Marnie. She later visits Cindy and is surprised that Cindy lives in a small flat. Whilst going around Hollyoaks with Cindy, she meets Tom who is angry that Jude hasn't called him leaving Jude upset. Whilst as The Dog in the Pond, she encounters Jack who she lashes out on for taking advantage of Dawn, as Jack will never forgive her for ruin his marriage with Celia. Cindy begs Jude to give her a discount for the flats that she is selling and Jude not wanting to sell the flat to Cindy refuses but later agrees. Cindy then signs and creates a petition to get Jude's building company sued and taken off, but then she calls it off so that she can get a discount off a house. The sisters then reconcile. Jude organizes the Hollyoaks "Halloween Spooktacular" in order to promote Royal Oakes; however, Cindy discovers that the whole project is a scam, and that Jude is intending to leave with a large bag of money, which she does.

== Maureen Matthews ==
Maureen Matthews
- Hollyoaks character
- Portrayed by: Carol Hawkins
- Duration: 1996–1997
- First appearance: 29 April 1996
- Last appearance: 11 August 1997
- Introduced by: Phil Redmond
In-universe information
- Husband: Mr Matthews
- Daughters: Julie Matthews

Maureen Matthews is the mother of Julie Matthews.

== Beth Keane ==
Beth Keane
- Hollyoaks character
- Portrayed by: Uncredited (1996–1997); Danielle Calvert (2004); Rebecca Ryan (2026–present)
- Duration: 1996–1997, 2004, 2026–present
- First appearance: 27 May 1996
- Introduced by: Phil Redmond (1996); Jo Hallows (2004); Hannah Cheers (2026)
In-universe information
- Other names: Bethany Keane
- Family: Cunningham/Osborne
- Father: Jack Osborne
- Mother: Dawn Cunningham
- Adoptive father: Dean Johnson
- Adoptive mother: Jacqui Johnson
- Brothers: Noah Johnson (adoptive)
- Half-brothers: Darren Osborne
- Half-sisters: Ruth Osborne
- Husband: Jonah Keane
- Adoptive sons: Maddox Keane
- Stepsons: Caleb Keane
- Grandfathers: Gordon Cunningham
- Grandmothers: Aggie Osborne; Angela Cunningham
- Uncles: Kenneth Osborne; Billy Brodie; Max Cunningham; Tom Cunningham
- Aunts: Cindy Cunningham; Jude Cunningham
- Nephews: JJ Osborne; Oscar Osborne
- Nieces: Frankie Osborne
- First cousins: Natalie Osborne; Rachel Osborne; Eva Falco; Holly Cunningham; Alfie Nightingale; Hilton Cunningham; Maddox Keane; Steph Cunningham-Lomax

Bethany "Beth" Keane (also Cunningham and Johnson) is the illegitimate daughter of Dawn Cunningham (Lisa Williamson) and Jack Osborne (Jimmy McKenna). She was the result of an affair between Dawn and Jack in 1990, causing Jack's daughter Ruth Osborne (Terri Dwyer) to end her friendship with Dawn, however Dawn put Bethany up for adoption. In 1996, Bethany arrived in Hollyoaks village when she needed a kidney transplant and Jack was the only option. Jack donated one of his kidneys after some hesitation. Dawn's sister Jude Cunningham (Davinia Taylor) tried to blackmail Jack about Bethany, but instead she ended up getting drunk and telling everyone at The Dog of Bethany. Jack tried to explain to his wife Celia Osborne (Carol Noakes), but she went back to America taking his son Darren Osborne (Adam Booth) with her. In 2004, Bethany came looking for Dawn and Jack before moving to Australia with her adoptive parents Dean and Jacqui and their son Noah, and before she leaves she meets Jack, Dawn's brother Max Cunningham (Matt Littler), their sister Cindy Cunningham (Stephanie Waring) and her daughter Holly (Karis Sharkey) and discovers that Dawn died of leukemia in 1997. Dawn's, Max's and Cindy's father Gordon Cunningham (Bernard Latham) was in a car accident in early 2004 in a car driven by his wife Helen Cunningham (Kathryn George) which led to their deaths and their son Tom Cunningham (Ellis Hollins) was left an orphan so he lived with Max.

In 2005, Jack sent an invitation for his wedding to Frankie Dean (Helen Pearson) for Bethany, but found out that she's couldn't attend. He and Frankie went to see her at their honeymoon. In 2008, Jack send her wedding of her uncle Max to Steph, however couldn't attend the wedding and following Max's death after the wedding, she couldn't attend due to school exams.

=== Reintroduction ===
On 11 March 2026, it was revealed that Bethany would be returning to the series, this time portrayed by Rebecca Ryan, who would arrive alongside a new family after casting speculations circulating the previous month. Initially, the name of her character wasn't revealed until the Hollyoaks spring trailer dropped on 30 March 2026. She will be joined by her on-screen partner, portrayed by Matthew Wolfenden and their son, portrayed by Lewis Walton. Alongside the family's casting, official photos of the family were released by Channel 4 which show the family loading up a van playfully before they relocate to Chester. Ryan previously played series regular Lydia Chambers in ITV soap opera Coronation Street as well as regular roles in Waterloo Road and Shameless. Ryan expressed her excitement about her casting: "I am so excited to be joining the cast of Hollyoaks. My character is feisty and a bit of a firecracker but fiercely loyal. I am so excited for everyone to meet her. I am having the best time so far and can't wait for her story to unfold."

== Michael St John Thomas ==
Michael St John Thomas
- Hollyoaks character
- Portrayed by: Tom Hudson
- Duration: 1996–1997
- First appearance: 13 May 1996
- Last appearance: 23 March 1997
- Introduced by: Phil Redmond

Michael St John Thomas played by Tom Hudson, appears as an ex-boyfriend of Maddie Parker. Before he arrives Maddie is stalked including having flowers sprayed across her car although she fails to find the culprit. He arrives at Hollyoaks where they resume their relationship. She later ends their relationship due to his jealous behaviour and he becomes obsessive over her. He begins stalking her and obsesses over her becoming his wife. He kidnaps her and friend Jude Cunningham before driving to Scotland. She refuses and he takes Jude up onto the roof. He contemplates pushing her but is distracted when Maddie arrives dressed in the wedding dress he brought for her. Jude breaks free of his clutches and he falls to his death.

== Mandy Richardson ==
Mandy Richardson (previously Hutchinson) played by Sarah Jayne Dunn debuted on-screen during October 1996 and has been involved in such storylines including dealing with sexual abuse while she was a child by her father Dennis (David McAllister), numerous failed relationships, and the death of daughter Grace to Sudden Infant Death Syndrome. Mandy is the longest-featured female character in the series.

Dunn first left in 2006, making brief returns in 2007 and 2008 before returning full-time in 2010 in a storyline which also saw the return of Warren Fox (Jamie Lomas). After leaving in September 2011, Dunn returned in July 2017 but left in December 2021 when her contract was terminated.

== Celia Osborne ==
Celia Osborne
- Hollyoaks character
- Portrayed by: Carol Noakes
- Duration: 1996–1997
- First appearance: 18 November 1996
- Last appearance: 19 June 1997
- Introduced by: Jo Hallows
In-universe information
- Occupation: Teacher
- Family: Osborne
- Father: Bert Andersen
- Mother: Beryl Andersen
- Brothers: Greg Andersen
- Husband: Jack Osborne (1968–1997); Jerry (1998–)
- Daughters: Ruth Osborne
- Adoptive sons: Darren Osborne
- Nieces: Natasha Andersen; Sarah Andersen

Celia Osborne (also Andersen) was the mother of Ruth Osborne and former wife of Jack Osborne. Celia arrived in Hollyoaks with Jack and his son Darren Osborne where they joined their daughter Ruth Osborne when Jack became the new landlord of The Dog in the Pond after Celia's brother Greg Andersen decided to sell the pub following the death of his daughter Natasha Andersen. After the revelation of Jack's affair and impregnation of Dawn Cunningham, Celia went back to the United States with Darren, leaving Jack running The Dog. They later divorced. Later Celia meets a man called Jerry and marries him. In September 2013, it is revealed that Celia is not Darren's mother and that Sandy Roscoe is his biological mother.

== Jack Osborne ==
Jack William Osborne, played by Jimmy McKenna, first appeared on 18 November 1996. Jack is the second-longest serving character; although Cindy Cunningham and Mandy Richardson both appeared before him, both have taken considerable breaks before they returned full-time.

== Darren Osborne ==
Darren Osborne made his first on-screen appearance on 18 November 1996, then played by Adam Booth. Darren was introduced by executive producer Phil Redmond as part of the Osborne family and debuted alongside his parents Jack and Celia Osborne. Booth left in 1997, leading to a recast with Ashley Taylor Dawson taking over the part in 1999. Dawson remained with the show until 2000, returning full-time in 2003.

He was initially portrayed as a bad boy type character although he later mellowed. His more notable storylines include a gambling addiction that led him to lose his share in The Dog in the Pond, being disowned by his father and having his family reject him. Other storylines include helping his father to fake his own death and relentless schemes to regain The Dog in The Pond. In his time with the show he has been at the centre of several relationships and affairs, one of which led him to become a father to twins. Various critics have praised his bad boy status. Others have criticised his "pimp-like” dress sense and accused him of being a "rat". Dawson has been nominated for several awards for his portrayal of Darren.
