= Cunningham family =

Fictional family in the soap opera Hollyoaks

- Hollyoaks family
- First appearance: 23 October 1995
- Created by: Phil Redmond
- Introduced by: Phil Redmond
- Duration: 1995–present

The Cunningham family are a fictional family in the long-running Channel 4 soap opera, Hollyoaks. The family were one of the original families introduced in 1995, debuting on the first episode of Hollyoaks. They originally consisted of Gordon Cunningham (Bernard Latham) and his ex-wife Angela (Liz Stooke), and their children: Dawn (Lisa Williamson), Jude (Davinia Taylor), Cindy (Hayley Fairclough/Laura Crossley/Stephanie Waring) and Max (Ben Sheriff/Matt Littler).

Subsequently, the family has seen more tragedy than happiness. Their storylines include Gordon and Angela divorcing, Dawn's affair with older Jack Osborne (Jimmy McKenna), her leukemia which leads to her death, Cindy's teenage pregnancy, Jude being in trouble with the police, the death of Gordon and his second wife Helen Richardson (Kathryn George) in a car accident and the death of Max on his wedding day to Steph Dean (Carley Stenson). In 2015, Gordon’s son Tom Cunningham (Ellis Hollins) was involved in a underaged sex storyline, which saw him become a father to Steph Cunningham-Lomax with his girlfriend Peri Lomax (Ruby O'Donnell). Other storylines include Cindy's bigamous marriage to Dirk Savage (David Kennedy) when she was still married to Mac Nightingale (David Easter), and had their son Alfie (Richard Linnell), Cindy’s relationship with Luke Morgan (Gary Lucy), and dealing with bereavement when Luke dies of an accident caused by frontotemporal dementia

As of 2026, Cindy (Stephanie Waring) and Beth (Rebecca Ryan) appear on the characters regular cast.

== History ==
Gordon was an only child. He had a cousin, Benny, who was a criminal and bad influence. Gordon married Angela, the pair had three daughters, Dawn, Cindy and Jude and one son, Max. Gordon and Angela split up before 1995. Gordon then found love in Helen Richardson, the pair married in 1999 and Helen gave birth to Tom Cunningham. The family, over the years, has been surrounded by death and heartbreak, Dawn died of leukaemia in 1997, Lee Stanley, father of Holly, also died in 1997. In 2004, Gordon suffered a heart attack whilst driving Helen and Tom. He crashed the car, which killed himself and Helen. In 2008, Max was run over and killed moments after marrying Steph Dean. Other relatives have also died. Grace Hutchinson, step-granddaughter of Gordon, died in 2006 of SIDS. Gordon's stepson, Lewis committed suicide in 2001. The Cunningham family have also owned several businesses since the beginning of Hollyoaks. Gordon became the owner of video shop, Got it Taped and later supermarket, Drive 'n' Buy. Gordon also became Councillor of Chester. After Gordon's death, Max inherited Drive 'n' Buy, which he sold to Neville Ashworth. Got it Taped was then sold to Tony Hutchinson. Max also owned part of The Loft before selling it to Clare Devine and also opened juice bar, MOB's (short for Max and OB's) with OB. After Max's death, Steph took over Max's half of MOB's and ran it with Cindy.

== In Hollyoaks ==
Before 1995, Dawn had begun an affair with best friend Ruth Osborne's father, Jack. Dawn got pregnant and gave baby Beth up for adoption to the Johnson family and had brought her up as their own. When Ruth found out, she did not want to see Dawn again. On her sixteenth birthday, Cindy slept with Lee Stanley, she then discovered she was pregnant. Max had struck a double act with Sam "OB" O'Brien. The pair were always involved in money making schemes. Dawn and James "Jambo" Bolton discovered Beth needed a kidney transplant. After a number of failed donors, Dawn told Jack of his illegitimate daughter. Jack was found to be a match and saved Beth's life. Dawn and Jambo then kissed after realising their feelings Dawn began feeling unwell and, with Jambo, she visited the doctor, who diagnosed her with leukaemia. On Christmas 1997, Jambo proposed to Dawn, who then died after her battle with leukaemia, the same day Cindy gave birth to Holly.

Cindy became depressed at being a 16-year-old mother and contemplated smothering her baby, however she could not go through with it and realised she did love Holly after all. She found love with Sean Tate; however, he hated Holly and began hurting her. After social services found out Holly was being abused, Cindy decided to leave Britain for abroad. On her way to the airport, she ran over Anna Green and left her for dead. In 2001, Cindy then had an affair with Mac Nightingale (David Easter) who recently about to get separated with his wife Marine Nightingale (Lynsey Anthony), and was pregnant with his child, and named him Teddy, but she given to Mac so her son will have a good future, so Mac and Marine pretend to adopted him and renamed him Alfie Nightingale. A debt-ridden Jude began stealing cars with her father's cousin Benny to pay off the debts. After months of stealing, the police came after Jude. Realising she could not go to jail, Jude donned a dark wig and used Dawn's passport to flee the country. Gordon began a relationship with Helen Richardson, who discovered she was pregnant. Gordon then proposed and the pair married. She then gave birth to Tom

Max became depressed over his stepbrother Lewis's death and decided to make the most of his life, which separated himself from OB. On a cliff trip, Max, OB, Ben Davies, Kristian Hargreaves, Jamie Nash and Theo Sankofa were climbing when more tragedy struck, leaving Jamie and Theo dead. Cindy returned with Holly in 2002, where she scammed Max and OB out of money before leaving once again. OB found out Helen was having an affair with Tony Hutchinson. He told Gordon who was heartbroken. Helen left Gordon but eventually returned to him. 2004 seen the deaths of Gordon and Helen, who died after Gordon had a heart attack at the wheel of a car and crashed it. Five-year-old Tom was put to stay with sister, Mandy, however, he soon moved in with Max and OB. At the funeral, Cindy returned for a brief stint, however, Jude did not.

Max bought part of The Loft nightclub. He made OB a co-manager. They hired an events organiser named Clare Devine, both Max and OB fell for her. Max began a relationship with Clare and asked her to move in. Mel Burton caught Clare sleeping with Sean Kennedy. OB told Max of this but Max took Clare's side and refused to believe it. He then proposed to Clare. Clare poisoned Max's mind into him believing that OB could not accept their relationship. As a result, Max and OB's friendship was over. As Clare planned to leave with Max's money, OB burst into the church and told him so. Max did not believe him and ended up marrying Clare, who thought up a new plan to kill Max and inherit the money. Max had a heart attack and Clare began to tamper with his medication in the hope he would have another and die. For Christmas, Clare took Max and Tom to a secluded cottage near a lake, there she put Tom's coat in the lake, which made Max jump in. Max then realised Tom was not in the lake. As he began to drown, OB turned up. Clare tried to tell him it was an accident, however, OB punched her and rescued Max. Clare was arrested, however was released. She then threatened to kill Max if he did not sign over The Loft. Realising Tom would be left alone, Max agreed and signed the deed.

Max became one of five named suspects for the attempted murder of Clare. Max was questioned but the police released him. Tom was put into foster care after Clare manipulated both Tom and social services. On the night she was pushed, Max had run into The Loft and publicly threatened to kill Clare. When Clare returned from the hospital, Max went into her house and poisoned her food as revenge, however she did not eat it. Max threatened her to tell the social services the truth, which she did. Clare supposedly left Hollyoaks but secretly kidnapped Katy Fox. Max, Warren and Justin went after her. Clare ordered Warren to kill Justin after it was revealed he had pushed her. They pretended to do so. Clare then ordered Max to kick "Justin's body", however, he could not because he was too nice. Clare sped off in the car with Katy and ended up going over a quarry, Max jumped in to save her but she disappeared beneath the water. Max confided in Steph over his guilt of letting Clare "die". The pair started a relationship and finally got engaged. At this time, Cindy returned to Hollyoaks with Holly after escaping her abusive ex-boyfriend. She began staying with Max, Tom and Steph. After marrying Steph, Max, along with OB and Tom went to get a present for Steph. On their way, Max saw Tom playing on the road and then Niall Rafferty, who then drove off, in his car. Max pushed Tom out of the way of the car, but was hit himself. OB and Tom held Max as he began to die, Steph came running over in her wedding dress just as he died. Cindy, Angela and Holly attend the funeral of Max, except for Jude, who was still wanted in Hollyoaks in ten years.

Mandy decided to let Tom stay with OB, who was moving to London to be with his girlfriend Summer. However, Tom realised Steph would be on her own if he left and decided to stay with her, she then became his legal guardian. Steph began a relationship with Niall, which Cindy and Mandy frowned upon, however their relationship ended after Steph realised she was not over Max. Cindy discovered Mandy was having an affair with Warren and threatened to tell his fiancée, Louise Summers. Warren told Cindy that if she did, he would hurt Holly. Cindy then started seeing Darren Osborne until he was sent to prison, where she started seeing Rhys Ashworth. Holly did not get along with Rhys to begin with but slowly they grew to like each other. Holly was then upset when Cindy split up from Rhys and returned to Darren, who had been released from prison. Steph took a holiday to Scotland with Craig Dean and Tom. There, Niall returned for revenge and kidnapped Tom. However, he ended up killing himself. Cindy split up with Darren after it was discovered he got Jake Dean to confess to Sean Kennedy's murder. Cindy then fell for Tony Hutchinson and they started going out. Cindy became jealous when she discovered Darren had drunkenly married Hannah Ashworth. She and Darren then decided to con both Tony and Hannah by stealing money from Tony and getting their hands on The Dog from Hannah.

== Generations ==
- Gordon Cunningham, married Angela Cunningham, Helen Richardson
  - Max Cunningham, son of Gordon and Angela, married Clare Devine, Steph Dean
  - Dawn Cunningham, daughter of Gordon and Angela
    - Bethany Johnson, daughter of Dawn and Jack Osborne (placed for adoption), married Jonah Keane
  - Jude Cunningham, daughter of Gordon and Angela
  - Cindy Cunningham, daughter of Gordon and Angela, married Tony Hutchinson, Alistair Longford, Mac Nightingale, Dirk Savage
    - Holly Cunningham, daughter of Cindy and Lee Stanley
    - Alfie Nightingale, son of Cindy and Mac Nightingale (adopted by Marnie Nightingale)
    - Hilton Cunningham, son of Cindy and Paul Browning
  - Tom Cunningham, son of Gordon and Helen
    - Steph Cunningham-Lomax, daughter of Tom and Peri Lomax

== Development ==
Due to being seen as the Hollyoaks original family, members of the Cunninghams have been popular, especially Max and Gordon. In 1997, Davinia Taylor was axed from her role as Jude for time-keeping issues. She departed in 1998. In 2008, it was reported that Taylor was to return to the show.

On 9 May 2008, it was announced that Matt Littler had quit his role as Max and would leave in the late Summer after almost 13 years of playing the character. In a 2008 episode of T4, Littler reprised his role as Max in a dream sequence that seen him reunited with on-screen father, Bernard Latham (Gordon) in heaven.
