= Ruth Osborne =

Fictional character from Hollyoaks

- Hollyoaks character
- Portrayed by: Terri Dwyer
- Duration: 1996–2001, 2003–2004, 2008
- First appearance: Episode 11; 1 January 1996
- Last appearance: Episode 2357; 5 August 2008
- Introduced by: Phil Redmond (1996); Jo Hallows (2003, 2004); Bryan Kirkwood (2008)
- Crossover appearances: Brookside (1998)
In-universe information
- Other names: Ruth Benson
- Occupation: Journalist
- Family: Osborne
- Father: Jack Osborne
- Mother: Celia Osborne
- Half-brothers: Darren Osborne
- Half-sisters: Bethany Cunningham
- Husband: Kurt Benson (1997–1999)
- Grandfathers: Bert Andersen
- Grandmothers: Aggie Osborne; Beryl Andersen
- Uncles: Kenneth Osborne; Billy Brodie; Greg Andersen
- Nephews: Jack Osborne; Oscar Osborne; Maddox Keane (adoptive)
- Nieces: Francine Osborne
- First cousins: Natasha Andersen; Sarah Andersen; Natalie Osborne; Rachel Osborne; Eva Falco

Ruth Osborne (also Benson) is a fictional character from the British Channel 4 soap opera Hollyoaks, played by Terri Dwyer. She first appeared in January 1996 as the cousin of Natasha Andersen (Shebah Ronay), and departed in 2001. She made guest appearances between 2003 and 2004, and another in 2008. Dwyer expressed interest in returning full-time in 2009.

Her notable storylines included a "controversial lesbian affair" with Jasmine Bates (Elly Fairman), and relationships with Kurt Benson (Jeremy Edwards), and Tony Hutchinson (Nick Pickard). Another storyline saw her form a relationship with Lewis Richardson (Ben Hull) which ended when he physically assaulted her, and due to feeling guilty committed suicide.

== Character creation and casting ==
Ruth was introduced by producer Phil Redmond in January 1996 as the cousin of established character Natasha Andersen (Shebah Ronay). Her family were introduced ten months later and are still part of the serial today. Dwyer was cast as Ruth after auditioning for the part. On getting the role Dwyer said "they took a big risk on me. I had done nothing in terms of acting, and for two years I never understood why I wasn't sacked. I thought I was appalling." On her audition Dwyer said "here were all these girls from stage school, and I came away thinking I didn't stand a chance. Three auditions later, I got the job." Dwyer first auditioned for the role after driving a friend to an audition for a role at Hollyoaks which she entered herself for fun and later got the job. On her initial time on the show Dwyer has since said "'Looking back at my first scenes, I think 'Oh no, how could they possibly televise this?'. For the first two years I kept expecting to be sacked".

Dwyer quit Hollyoaks in 2001. She said "I played Ruth for six years and I think the audience was bored of her and I was bored of playing her." Ruth returned again in 2008 for her father's funeral. Of a potential return, Dwyer said in 2009 "if Hollyoaks came to me with a great script I would definitely go back".

== Characterisation ==
Dwyer described the character saying "I like Ruth but she does my head in a bit. She whinges a bit much, is a bit miserable and gets on my nerves". On Ruth Dwyer also said "She engages her mouth before her brain!" The Daily Mirror described her as "chic but sensible Ruth" and "troubled". The Sunday Mail labelled her "sexy".

== Storylines ==
Ruth arrives as a student and begins to date heartthrob Kurt Benson (Jeremy Edwards). Ruth's father Jack (James McKenna), mother Celia (Carol Noakes) and younger brother Darren (Adam Booth) moved into Hollyoaks village where they buy the local pub The Dog in the Pond. Ruth is shocked to discover her father and best friend Dawn Cunningham (Lisa Williamson) had slept together. Ruth's decided that she didn't want to see Dawn again, causing hating Dawn's family for the rest of her life, but, she forgives her when she discovers that Dawn had leukemia, which leads her to death. Ruth began getting hassle from Spike who tried to entrap her, but Kurt intervened and accidentally pushed Spike off the scaffolding. Kurt is charged, causing more problems in their relationship. Kurt becomes paranoid that Ruth thinks he is guilty and he breaks up with her and leaves, going to Hull. Ruth follows him and they marry. Ruth's troubles with Spike continue when she discovers that Spike, amongst other builders will be going to repair the college. Spike traps Ruth in a room and tries to force himself on her, but Rob Hawthorne (Warren DeRosa) steps in to rescue her.

Ruth's marriage with Kurt is on the rocks as they argue, especially about spending Christmas with Ruth's family. It goes from bad to worse when Rob organises a hill walk in Wales and after Ruth has another argument with Kurt, she ends up going off with Lewis Richardson (Ben Hull). Ruth and Lewis take refuge in a cave where they kiss. Ruth then decides to go off to London for some work placement, leaving Kurt home alone. When Ruth returns, she is devastated to learn that Kurt is having an affair with Kate Patrick (Natasha Symms) and Ruth tells Kurt their marriage is over. Ruth gets into a fight with Kate that ends with Kate trying to drown her. In a fit of rage, Kurt intervened, trying to teach Kate a lesson by drowning her. In a wake of the fight, Ruth and Kurt do some soul searching and realised that they are not right for each other, prompting Kurt to leave Hollyoaks, and more bad news for Ruth, as she discovers that Kurt had died from a ski accident. Ruth has a short relationship with flatmate Jasmine Bates, but she later throws her out of the flat.

Following his separation and death, Ruth begins to rekindle her affair with Lewis, but they both agree to keep their relationship secret. Ruth takes a break from her relationship with Lewis and meets Luke Morgan (Gary Lucy) who seduces her. However, Ruth is embarrassed to discover he is only 16 and on top of that when she confesses to Lewis what has happened he dumps her. Ruth decides that there was nothing left for her at Hollyoaks village and decides to move to the States, but Lewis makes a mad dash to the airport to stop her, prompting Ruth to stay. During the first late night special, Lucy Benson (Kerrie Taylor) is kidnapped by Rob Hawthorne and taken to a disused watertank, with Ruth, Lewis and Tony in pursuit. The gang survive and rescue Lucy.

Ruth finds out that she is pregnant and without Lewis knowing, has an abortion. Ruth then discovers that Lewis had lied about how big his debt to Lorraine Wilson is, prompting Ruth to hit Lewis before Lewis hits her back in retaliation. Lewis tells Ruth that he had slept with Lorraine to pay off his debt, which leaves Ruth heartbroken. Ruth and Lewis finally break up and Ruth than begins to date John Stuart (Andrew Henderson), her colleague, but it soon ends. In a special 16-part late-night show Hollyoaks: Movin' On, Lewis beats Ruth up before trying to force himself on her, leaving Ruth for dead. Ruth is badly hurt and in hospital is told Lewis has died after taking an overdose of painkillers. Ruth has a brief relationship with friend Tony but later leaves Hollyoaks to start a new life in London.

On 24 December 2003 Ruth returns to Hollyoaks village. She rekindles her relationship with Tony Hutchinson (Nick Pickard) despite his marriage to Mandy Richardson (Sarah Jayne Dunn) and later becomes pregnant. She returns to London where she loses the baby. She later returns to the village and supports Tony when he is accused of beating Mandy. She's later discover that Dawn's brother Max Cunningham (Matt Littler) was the one who held the key for his sister affair with her father, causing her to not forgive him. Ruth returns on 5 August 2008 for the 'funeral' of Jack, unaware that the whole thing is an insurance scam, she tells her stepmother Frankie (Helen Pearson) she is engaged.

== Reception ==
The Liverpool Daily Post called her "one of the nation's best-loved soap babes". The Daily Record listed her among "The soap stars who boosted the ratings with their shocking clinches" for her part in a lesbian storyline. The Daily Record described her saying she "overacts her way through another scene" when she finds vows Kurt is out of her life for good. The Daily Record also commented on Ruth's relationship with Lewis saying "He's just turned from one of the most easy-going blokes around into a woman-beater. Yep, when he finds out Ruth has aborted the baby, he hits her. Not a good move at all. It might be Ruth, but we can't condone this, can we? I'd smash both their heads together, the rotten pair." They described the storyline as a cracker and the attempted rape scenes as "some of the grittiest storylines ever seen in a soap". All About Soap magazine placed Kurt and Ruth's wedding at number nineteen on their twenty greatest soap weddings list.

The Daily Record's Merle Brown commented on Ruth saying "while they're at it, why not blow up Ruth, and put her out of her misery. Terri Dwyer, who plays her (after a fashion) is wooden as well, and seeing her painful attempts at emotional scenes is just too much to take." Brown also listed her amongst his least favourite soap characters saying "Lewis, my least favourite soap character of all time (although Ruth is right up there with him), is feeling guilty about his tryst with Lorraine and refuses to sleep with her again. Which opens the gates, methinks for Ruth to find out, and a big barney to ensue. Great. I can hardly wait to see Terri Dwyer overact her way through this one." Upon Dwyer receiving a nomination Brown later added "if Terri Dwyer wins Best Actress I shall really have to complain. How can she even be nominated?". The Sunday Mail commented on her time in the show saying she has had "controversial storylines" including "attempted rape, married young, kicked out by her husband over an affair, then widowed, a lesbian kiss with a 17-year-old, and now an unwanted pregnancy. No wonder the blonde babe gets most of the show's fan letters." The Daily Mirror commented that her Christmas return put the "cracker back into Christmas".

Ruth in Hollyoaks was also known as a rather loud mouthed character, evidence of this is seen in an episode where while she is talking Lucy Benson's hand covers her mouth in order to gag her but Ruth continues to try and talk but just makes muffled sounds under Lucy's hand.

The Daily Record commented negatively on Ruth's relationship with Kurt saying that the pair needed a "mallet on the head" after their marriage breakdown. They added that "Ruth is still doing the angst-ridden facial expression in Hollyoaks this week as she and hubby Kurt are nowhere nearer sorting out their relationship" and later said Kurt "is still pleading for a reconciliation with Ruth".

Ruth and flatmate Jasmine Bates sleep together after spending the night sharing a bottle of wine. The Daily Record described the storyline saying "Wait until the TV watchdog people see this week's Hollyoaks - lesbian kissing scenes at tea-time. Phil Redmond brought you your first lesbian kiss in Brookside a good few years ago now and there was uproar. Now he's at it again in his teen-soap as a good old heart-to-heart between Jas and Ruth over a bottle of wine leads to something more. The next morning, Ruth is not a happy girl at all, as she regrets her night of passion with her flatmate. Oh dear. Sparks will fly." The Daily Record described the brief relationship saying "In Hollyoaks it's the end of the road as Jas moves out of Ruth's flat after their night of passion. Ruth, it seems, is not one for the ladies."
