= Dawn Cunningham =

Fictional character from Hollyoaks

- Hollyoaks character
- Portrayed by: Lisa Williamson
- Duration: 1995–1997
- First appearance: Episode 1; 23 October 1995
- Last appearance: Episode 169; 22 December 1997
- Created by: Phil Redmond
- Introduced by: Phil Redmond
In-universe information
- Occupation: Student; Shop assistant
- Family: Cunningham
- Father: Gordon Cunningham
- Mother: Angela Cunningham
- Stepfather: Terry Williams
- Brothers: Max Cunningham
- Sisters: Cindy Cunningham; Jude Cunningham
- Half-brothers: Tom Cunningham
- Daughters: Bethany Cunningham
- Grandsons: Maddox Keane (adoptive)
- Nephews: Maddox Keane; Hilton Cunningham; Alfie Nightingale
- Nieces: Steph Cunningham-Lomax

Dawn Cunningham is a fictional character from the British soap opera Hollyoaks, played by Lisa Williamson. Williamson was cast as one of the original characters on Hollyoaks in 1995, and was the first member of the Cunningham family to arrive in the village, before the introduction of her family. However, she left in 1997 when the character died following a battle with leukemia.

== Casting ==
Hollyoaks initially focused on the lives and loves of seven teenagers living in a fictional suburb of Chester. Dawn was one of the original characters created by Phil Redmond, and she was introduced in the show's first episode, which aired on 23 October 1995. Williamson secured the role of Dawn without any formal training in acting. She heard about the audition for Hollyoaks while she was in a theatre group. Williamson was surprised to be cast after auditioning, saying "I was incredibly lucky. Loads were up for the part."

== Development ==
"Dawn, 18, is Natasha's best friend and is very practical – until the weekend when anything goes. Affected by her parents' divorce, she feels responsible for looking after her younger brother Max and sister Cindy. She works in the Interior Design shop."

— Dawn's character outline published in the Chester Chronicle (October 1995).

The character was the first member of the Cunningham family to be introduced to the serial. Dawn is described as "spirited, independent and friendly to everyone ... her friends could always rely on Dawn for a shoulder to cry on". The Liverpool Echo described her as an "easy-going interior designer. She was someone who had time for everyone and a shoulder to cry on." The Independent described her as the "equally stunning" friend of Natasha and questioned how she could balance "wild weekends and the emotional demands of a divorced mother with a toyboy?" before asking "Will anyone care?" The character's home life is troubled, she frequently clashes with her mother's "troublesome" new boyfriend Terry Williams (Ian Puleston-Davies), and has to cope with her younger siblings Max Cunningham (Ben Sheriff) and Cindy Cunningham (Hayley Fairclough) wanting to live with their father.

Dawn was the focus of the show's first teen pregnancy storyline. While exploring the character's fictional backstory, it emerges that she had a relationship with Jack Osborne (Jimmy McKenna) when she was 16. She became pregnant and subsequently had the baby adopted out. The storyline was revisited following the death of Natasha Andersen (Shebah Ronay), as a "distressed" Dawn tells Jambo Bolton (Will Mellor) that she has a daughter. Dawn is "horrified" when Jambo then decides to find her child for her. Williamson stated "I think Dawn secretly wants to know how her child is doing, but she also feels Jambo has betrayed her trust." Jack learns the truth when Dawn tells him their daughter has kidney failure and needs a transplant. The illegitimate baby plot also led to Jambo eventually becoming Dawn's love interest.

As the serial's output increased to two episodes a week in late 1996, with producers promising further "hard-hitting" stories, the Daily Mirror's Fiona Parker questioned whether Dawn and Jambo would finally get together as part of the new series. Williamson told Parker that the pair are "really good friends" and Jambo had helped Dawn out a lot, but she and Mellor did not know what was going to happen. Mellor said that Jambo wanted a romantic relationship with Dawn, but added "Dawn's got problems and she doesn't know what she wants."

In 1997, the character was central to an issue-based storyline focusing on the diagnosis and treatment of leukaemia. At the time, more than 5,000 people in the UK were diagnosed with the disease every year. Williamson called the storyline "very strong" and admitted that there were times where she was emotionally drained from filming, however, she welcomed the challenge the storyline provided her. She commented: "A big storyline like this gives you something to really get your teeth into acting-wise." The actress worked with The Leukaemia Care Society to accurately portray how her character would be feeling. She found that the worst thing about the disease was having to tell loved ones and seeing their emotions. She explained that for Dawn, there are feelings of "this overwhelming, looming sense of guilt about what she is putting her boyfriend Jambo and her family through." As the story progresses, treatment options for Dawn are explored, including a bone marrow transplant. Her sister Jude is found to be a match, but Dawn must undergo chemotherapy first. Williamson said the chemo is "awful" and means Dawn could be in and out of hospital for years. She branded her character "a real fighter" and said she was determined to beat the disease.

The storyline eventually led to the character's departure from the show on 22 December 1997, as Dawn dies in Jambo's arms. The show's creator Phil Redmond said it was "a normal death" and handled sensitively following medical research from the scriptwriters. The show's executive producer Jo Hallows later assessed that Dawn's departure from Hollyoaks was memorable. She told Wendy Granditer from Inside Soap that Dawn and Jambo's relationship was filled with "lovely stuff". She believed it was "a relationship that viewers really cared about." She believed that Dawn's leukaemia diagnosis, the build-up to her death and viewer's adoration of their romance "made it all the more devastating".

== Storylines ==
Dawn is the eldest of Gordon (Bernard Latham) and Angela Cunningham's (Liz Stooke) children. At sixteen, Dawn has an affair with her best friend Ruth Osborne's (Terri Dwyer) father Jack. She becomes pregnant and gives birth to a daughter, Bethany, who she puts up for adoption. Dawn befriends Natasha Andersen. She works at Maddie Parker's (Yasmin Bannerman) mother's interior design shop and has continual problems with her mother's boyfriend, Terry Williams (Ian Puleston-Davies), but refuses to let anything get her down. Natasha dies after Rob Hawthorne (Warren Derosa) spikes her drink with drugs at Lucy Benson's (Kerrie Taylor) 18th birthday party. Dawn is so distressed that she tells Jambo Bolton about her daughter. Jambo gets in contact with Dawn's daughter and Dawn goes to see her. Dawn watches her from a distance while Jambo stands close by to provide her with a shoulder to cry on.

Dawn discovers that her mother, Angela, has breast cancer; upset by the news of her mother's condition, Dawn turns to Jambo. The pair kiss, but Dawn insists that they should remain friends. Dawn learns that Terry has run off, leaving her mother in debts of over £55,000. Dawn's bad luck continues when she learns that her daughter Bethany has kidney failure and she is her last hope. However, Dawn finds out that she is not compatible, so Gordon offers her his kidney instead. However, Gordon is not a match, so Dawn contacts Jack Osborne. Jack is shocked as he had not known about the pregnancy, but he is a match and the operation is a success. Jambo and Dawn realise they love each other. Dawn soon feels unwell and visits her doctor, only to discover that she has leukaemia. When Ruth finds out about her illness, she forgives Dawn for her affair with Jack. On Christmas Day, Jambo and Dawn hire a rowing boat and Jambo asks Dawn to marry him. Dawn, however, dies in his arms, the same day her niece Holly Cunningham (Karis Sharkey) is born.

== Reception ==
As part of Inside Soap magazine's Turn-ons & Turn-offs! feature, columnist Steven Murphy pleaded for Dawn and Jambo to "live happily ever after" amidst her leukaemia storyline, adding "they deserve to stay together." The Daily Record said of the show "Favourites have to be Jude's sickly-sweet sister Dawn, whose untimely death caused much distress." They also commented on the character's death saying "When there's a problem with a character in Hollyoaks, they just kill them off."
