= Lewis Richardson (Hollyoaks) =

UK soap opera character, created 1995

- Hollyoaks character
- Portrayed by: Ben Hull
- Duration: 1995–2001
- First appearance: 30 October 1995
- Last appearance: 15 October 2001
- Created by: Phil Redmond
- Introduced by: Phil Redmond
- Spin-off appearances: Hollyoaks: Movin' On (2001)
In-universe information
- Occupation: Businessman
- Father: Dennis Richardson
- Mother: Helen Cunningham
- Stepfather: Gordon Cunningham
- Sisters: Mandy Richardson
- Half-brothers: Tom Cunningham
- Nephews: DJ Morgan
- Nieces: Grace Hutchinson; Ella Richardson; Steph Cunningham-Lomax

Lewis Richardson is a fictional character from the British Channel 4 soap opera Hollyoaks, played by Ben Hull. Lewis was introduced by Phil Redmond as part of the Richardson family. Lewis made his first on-screen appearance on 30 October 1995 before departing on 15 October 2001. Lewis was initially a "good bloke" but changed, becoming like his abusive father Dennis Richardson. Lewis's exit from the serial was devised by series producer Jo Hallows who decided to kill Lewis on screen as part of a suicide storyline. The storyline was devised to show the "full horror" of suicide.

== Casting ==
Hull was cast in the role in 1995. Hull said that "as soon as I heard about the show - and this was before it was actually aired - I thought it had enormous potential, and I really wanted to be part of it". Hull described hearing of his casting as a "such a wonderful feeling". Hull quit the role in 2001. Hull said that he felt it was "time to do other things" adding that he was "very proud of Hollyoaks and what we've done with it". Hull added that "playing Lewis has been a wonderful experience. It's been hard work, but well worth it". Hull said that he quit because "I'd go home after filming and feel incredibly depressed, playing such a tormented and depressed character was exhausting". Hull admitted he had reservations after quitting the role and questioned if he had made the right decision.

== Development ==
=== Characterisation ===
Hull described Lewis saying: "He was not a nasty person because he was just evil - he was that way because of the way he was brought up and I think people saw through that". Hull also described Lewis as "tormented". Hull said that when styling his character he was "going for a whole James Dean look and failed miserably on all counts". Hull described the character's time on the serial saying that Lewis "started off as a lovely bloke but tried to murder his girlfriend and then committed suicide".

Lewis's characterisation changed over his duration on the serial, being described as a "nice guy-turned-baddie". Lewis has been described as a "nice guy", a "lovable rogue", "hapless", a "wheeler-dealer", "troubled", a "self-destructive soul", "messed- up", a "violent thug" and a bad boy. Lewis has also been branded a "heartthrob" and "hunky", while his duration on the serial has been described saying he was "the boy-next-door who had a stormy relationship with Ruth, turned into a gambling, wife-beating monster and ultimately topped himself".

=== Exit ===
On his character's decision to commit suicide Ben Hull said "Lewis's greatest fear was that one day he would become like his father, alcoholic and abusive - and he has". Hull said that Lewis does not "doesn't romanticise it in any way" when committing suicide. For the scenes Hull had to be "severely jaundiced and wear yellow contact lenses". Hull described Lewis's final scenes as "awful" and "really traumatic". Hull felt that he "couldn't have asked for a better send-off". On his exit Hull said: "When the producer outlined the story of Lewis's self-destruction, my reaction was, 'Brilliant!' Lewis was a good bloke for most of the time, but he's always been involved in something a little bit dodgy. Where can he go from here except to reform and mend his ways? I think we've all seen that before, so for me it was better to do something totally unexpected and challenging, rather than just fade away". Hull added that the scenes were a "nightmare" to film especially the character's final scene which was "really tough". Hull felt that the storyline was done responsibly as it "shows the reality of suicide and there are helpline numbers at the end of the programme. If it can help one person then what we've attempted to do will succeed". Hull felt a responsibility to make his scenes as realistic as possible. To do this Hull said he "read a lot and talked to a medical advisor about what state Lewis would be in and what actually happens; the agony you go through. I came to the conclusion that too much wasn't enough. It's so awful, it's impossible to overplay it". On Lewis's state of mind Hull said that "Lewis thinks he's got no alternative to suicide, but that's not the case. What we're trying to promote is that people need to talk". Hull felt the character's death was "good" as it provided closure for Lewis for fans. He felt that despite Lewis's actions fans remained sympathetic towards him.

Series producer Jo Hallows was responsible for Lewis's exit and decided to kill him off. Hallows decided to highlight the unglamorous side and "the full horror" of suicide, she felt satisfied that the storyline had achieved this. Describing the emotional impact the storyline had on her, Hallows said: "I saw Lewis's death being filmed and, even though I knew what to expect and what was coming next, it was so absolutely terrible it brought tears to my eyes. I think people will be truly shocked, I'd be amazed if they weren't, because it is such a horrible death". Hallows hoped the scenes would have a positive impact for those facing similar problems to Lewis and would help them to talk about their difficulties. Hallows opined that the decision for Lewis to commit suicide was made to raise awareness of the subject and not to gain viewers. Hallows felt that if "Lewis's story can help one person and save them from going down that same route, then it will have been an issue worth doing". Hollyoaks worked closely with Campaign Against Living Miserably when developing the storyline. The Liverpool Echo described Lewis's final scenes as "a shocking soap storyline as graphic as any ever seen on TV".

== Storylines ==
Lewis first arrives in Hollyoaks as part of the Richardson family, and is protective over his sister Mandy (Sarah Jayne Dunn) because they were both abused by their father Dennis (David McAllister). Lewis moves into a flat above the Video Shop with sisters Jude (Davinia Taylor) and Dawn Cunningham (Lisa Williamson). Lewis dates Jude but ends the relationship upon discovering from Jude’s criminal activities. Lewis discovers that his sister Mandy has gone missing and along with his father, Lewis begins searching for her. Lewis worries when he thinks Mandy may have committed suicide but Lewis finds Mandy alive in a hospital. Lewis arrives at her bedside and is devastated when Mandy confesses that their father had raped her. Lewis supports Mandy and together they report the incident to the police. Dennis is soon after arrested. Lewis takes care of Mandy, helping her through her trial. Their father is found guilty and is sentenced for seven years imprisonment.

Lewis begins a relationship with Ruth Osborne (Terri Dwyer), following the separation from her husband Kurt Benson, although they decide to keep it secret. The relationship ends when Ruth confesses that she has slept with Luke Morgan (Gary Lucy). Beth Morgan (Elizabeth O'Grady) and Lewis begin a relationship. Lewis ends the relationship after deciding Beth is too young for him. Lewis is shocked to discover that his mum Helen Richardson (Kathryn George) was pregnant with Gordon Cunningham's (Bernard Latham) child. Helen's wedding to Gordon makes Lewis realise his feelings for Ruth and the pair reunite. Lewis rescues Lucy Benson (Kerrie Taylor), Tony Hutchinson (Nick Pickard) and Ruth from Rob Hawthorne (Warren De Rosa). Lewis goes into business with Rory Finnigan (James Redmond), as the pair open a night-club which they call The Loft. Lewis befriends another local nightclub owner, Lorraine Wilson (Jo-Anne Knowles), and Lewis begins to gamble in her casino. Lewis discovers that Ruth has had an abortion and in a rage he hits her. Lewis begins borrowing money from Lorraine, which mounts up. Lorraine offers him the chance to wipe his debt by having sex with her. Ruth discovers Lewis's debt and his stealing so hits him, to which he responds by hitting her back. Lewis and Ruth end their relationship. Helen becomes suspicious of Lewis's gambling addiction. In a rage Lewis almost hits his mother. Lewis decides to visit Ireland to spend some time alone and returns as a new man. A loan shark arrives looking for Lewis as he had taken a loan out in Ireland under the name of Ruth's dead husband, Kurt Benson (Jeremy Edwards). Lewis is given thirty days to repay his debts. To repay his debt Lewis has sex with Geri Hudson (Joanna Taylor) before stealing money off her which she had made from a charity event. Ruth discovers Lewis's debts and persuades Tony to buy Lewis out of The Loft.

In Hollyoaks: Movin' On, Lewis tries to persuade Ruth to reignite their relationship, but Ruth is angered when she discovers Lewis had used Kurt’s name for a loan. Lewis arrives at Ruth’s flat where he attempts to force himself on her. Ruth tells Lewis that he is like his father, which Lewis responded to by beating her before leaving her for dead. Feeling guilty for what he had done, Lewis takes an overdose of paracetemol. He awakes at the hospital but dies soon after.

== Reception ==
Hull was nominated for Best villain and Best actor in 2002 at the British Soap Awards for his role. The Liverpool Echo described Lewis as "one of the programme's most popular characters". The storyline in which Lewis has sex with Lorraine to pay off his debts was described as a "sizzling sex shocker plotline" in which Lewis "will become a sex slave in a torrid new storyline". The Daily Record initially described him as a "nice bloke", but later commented that Lewis "turned from one of the most easy-going blokes around into a woman-beater". They felt that Lewis hitting Ruth was "not a good move at all" and added that they would "smash both their heads together, the rotten pair". They went on to describe the storyline as a "cracker". The Daily Record later described Lewis as "tragic". The Sunday Mail described the scenes where Lewis hits Ruth as "sickening". The Liverpool Echo described Lewis's death as "harrowing". In 2007 Hull said that he was still regularly recognised for his role of Lewis.
