= Liz Stooke =

British actress

- Born: Kent, England, UK
- Occupation: Actress
- Years active: 1970s–2008
- Television: Hollyoaks

Liz Stooke is a British actress. Born in Kent, she initially trained to be a teacher in Devon and Manchester before becoming a receptionist at London Drama School. After joining a few theatre companies and taking part in a tour, Stooke had roles in several stage productions, including adaptations of Time and the Conways, Present Laughter, Moll Flanders, A Midsummer Night's Dream and The Government Inspector. She played the regular role of Angela Cunningham on the British soap opera Hollyoaks between 1995 and 1999, later returning for guest appearances in 2004, 2006 and 2008. She has also appeared in the soap operas Coronation Street and Emmerdale, as well as other television series and films.

== Life and career ==
Liz Stooke was born in Kent, England in the 1950s. Her father worked in the banking business and thus she moved around every two years. After a "convent education", Stooke enrolled in a teacher training college in Devon, but she left after a year when she fell "hopelessly in love". She then moved to Glossop with her partner, where she began taking an interest in amateur theatre; she then decided not to get married and completed her teaching training, and she subsequently did a three-year course in Manchester and specialised in teaching disabled children. She continued having an interest in acting and got a job as a receptionist at the London Drama School; she enjoyed the job but got "fed up" with directors asking students to take part in plays and films as she thought "why not me?" She then got a job in the Brian Way Children's Theatre and joined the Pitlochry Festival Theatre, which Stooke called "hard work" as they rehearsed three shows in a fortnight and went on a 12-week tour in a transit van in the Highlands and Islands; Stooke called the experience "worthwhile" and was thankful that the people there got on.

Stooke wanted to do theatre work in education and worked in Coventry for 18 months before working in the M6 Theatre Company in Rochdale for four years. As part of the group, she was part of the stage production of Titanic, based on the sinking of the Titanic, which was performed to schools and the public in the day and evening, in 1979. Stooke portrayed the real-life survivors Madeleine Astor and Kate Gilnagh in the production. A writer from the Rochdale Observer believed that Stooke performed a "moving" song in the production. Stooke then worked in the Avon Touring Company, where she met director Clare Grove. As part of the company, she was one of the actors in the production of Horror Story at the Albany Centre in Bristol in 1984. Ian Onions from the Evening Post wrote that Stooke and three other actors "showed clever dexterity in switching roles so quickly and playing with conviction, although they were a little overexuberant at times". She then had a role in the stage production of Present Laughter at the Crucible Theatre in Sheffield, which she considered different from the work she had previously done. In 1987, Stooke finished her stint playing one of the three Molls in the stage production of Moll Flanders. Stooke had received a phone call from Grove asking her to take part in the production. Kevin Lloyd from the Derby Express believed that Stooke's performances were "excellent" in the "highly successful productions". Stooke subsequently decided to stay in Derby after the conclusion of the production as she was asked to play Helena in a stage production of A Midsummer Night's Dream by a director. Stooke said that she "enjoyed every minute of the rehearsal period".

In 1987, Stooke played a customs officer in the television crime drama Floodtide. In 1988, she played Joan in Derby Playhouse's stage production of Time and the Conways, which ran until 25 June 1988. That same year, she also had a role as the boss' daughter in the rehearsed reading of Peter Gibbs' Selling the Sizzle at the Derby Playhouse. She then played Margie Bellenger in A Day in Summer, a 1989 television movie based on the novel of the same name by J. L. Carr. Stooke also played a prosecuting counsel in an episode of the soap opera Brookside, which was originally broadcast on 29 March 1989. In 1990, Stooke guest starred in the second episode of the fifth series of the British sitcom Watching. The following year, she was part of the cast of The Government Inspector at the Greenwich Theatre; Charles Spencer from The Daily Telegraph opined that Stooke was one of the cast members to provide "excellent comic value". In 1995, Stooke joined the original cast of the new Channel 4 soap opera Hollyoaks as Angela Cunningham, part of the Cunningham family. She remained in the role until 1999, and made a guest appearance in 2004 and 2006. Stooke made another return to the soap in 2008 for the funeral of Angela's son, Max Cunningham (Matt Littler). In 1997, Stooke presented The Duke of Edinburgh's Award to several young people in a church in Bury.

Stooke had a guest role in the fifth episode of the 23rd series of Last of the Summer Wine, "Beware Of The Hot Dog", which initially aired on 3 February 2002. In 2003, Stooke played Lila Griffith in the ITV soap opera Emmerdale. She has also appeared in the television series First Among Equals, Nice Guy Eddie, Children's Ward, Heartbeat and Casualty, as well as the soap opera Coronation Street. Additionally, she had a role in the 1988 film The Fruit Machine.

== Acting credits ==
=== Selected filmography ===
List of acting roles in television and film
Year	Title	Role	Notes	Ref(s).
1986	First Among Equals	—N/a	Television series	
1987	Floodtide	Customs officer	Crime drama	
1988	The Fruit Machine	—N/a	Film	
1989	A Day in Summer	Margie Bellenger	Television movie	
1989	Brookside	Prosecuting Counsel	Guest role (1 episode)	
1990	Watching	Sally	1 episode (Series 5, episode 2)	
1995–99, 2004, 2006, 2008	Hollyoaks	Angela Cunningham	Regular role	
2002	Last of the Summer Wine	Fifi	1 episode ("Beware Of The Hot Dog")	
2003	Emmerdale	Lila Griffith	Guest role	

=== Theatre credits ===
List of acting roles in theatre
Year	Production	Location	Role	Ref.
Unknown	Present Laughter	Crucible Theatre	—N/a	
1979	Titanic	Various	Madeleine Astor; Kate Gilnagh	
1984	Horror Story	Albany Centre	Various	
c. 1987	Moll Flanders	Moll	—N/a	
1987	A Midsummer Night's Dream	—N/a	Helena	
1988	Time and the Conways	Derby Playhouse	Joan	
1988	Selling the Sizzle	Derby Playhouse	Boss' daughter	
1991	The Government Inspector	Greenwich Theatre	—N/a	
