= Rob Hawthorne (Hollyoaks) =

- Hollyoaks character
- Portrayed by: Warren Derosa
- Duration: 1996–1999
- First appearance: 12 February 1996
- Last appearance: 28 December 1999
- Created by: Phil Redmond
- Introduced by: Phil Redmond
- Spin-off appearances: Hollyoaks: Off on One (1998)
In-universe information
- Occupation: College student

Robert "Rob" Hawthorne is a fictional character from the British Channel 4 soap opera Hollyoaks, played by Warren Derosa. Derosa first appeared in the role in January 1996 before the character departed, making his final appearance on 28 December 1999. The character is known for his status as a villain, with Derosa describing him as a "theatrical villain".

== Casting ==
Derosa initially auditioned for the role of Tony Hutchinson, however it was Nick Pickard who was eventually cast. Two weeks later, Derosa received a call from the producers and was offered the role of Rob. The actor auditioned two days later and he began filming his first scenes shortly afterwards. Derosa departed the role in 1999, making his last appearance as Rob on 28 December of that year.

== Development ==
Derosa left Hollyoaks after his character was stranded at sea in the video spin-off Hollyoaks: Off on One. He told Wendy Granditer of All About Soap that he thought that was it and he did not want to return to the show. However, the producers called him and asked if he would return for a four-night special. Derosa said he read the scripts and knew he had to return. He added "Since then the storylines have stayed strong and the producers have allowed me to turn Rob into a real theatrical villain, which I love."

In another storyline, Rob kidnaps and attempts to drown Lucy Benson (Kerrie Taylor) in a tank of water at an abandoned nautical test centre. Ruth Osborne (Terri Dwyer), Lewis Richardson (Ben Hull), Carol Groves (Natalie Casey) and Tony Hutchinson (Nick Pickard) also feature in the story and water scenes. The show's executive producer Jo Hallows told Wendy Granditer from Inside Soap that the story was logistically difficult to film because the cast had to be suspended in a twenty-foot deep water tank and film under water. Hallows added "they were all great - they didn't complain once." Hallows described Rob as being the show's "campest villain but he worked brilliantly."

== Storylines ==
Rob never saw eye-to-eye with Kurt Benson; despite this, he dated Kurt's sister Lucy. Rob's best friend was Dermot Ashton, and they both got into trouble. It started when Rob and Dermot caused a stir in Hollyoaks by putting a tablet in Natasha Anderson’s drink during Lucy's 18th birthday bash. This then led to Natasha's death. Kurt and Bazz pointed the finger at Rob and Dermot; however, neither of them had any real proof. Rob felt guilty over Natasha's death and broke off his relationship with Lucy.

Despite that, Rob still wanted to be with Lucy and Lucy gave him one last chance. Dermot told Rob that he had money problems and Rob planned to rob a drug dealer's lock up. Rob had taken Lucy and Carol Groves as alibis and the robbery was going according to plan, but the dealer caught them. Rob, Dermot, Carol, and Lucy all managed to escape, but they were chased by the dealer. Despite Lucy and Carol's protests to stop the car, Rob continued and lost control. The car ended up in the River Dee, but they survived, apart from Dermot. Lucy then confessed all to the police, but the police had little to arrest Rob on. Rob's problems went from bad to worse when Kurt, Jambo Bolton, Lucy, and Carol followed Rob on a night's 'work' in the hope that he might incriminate himself. When they finally caught up with him, they personally delivered Rob to the drug dealers from whom Rob had stolen money. The dealers ended up throwing Rob off the roof of a car park, injuring one of Rob's legs. Rob blamed Kurt for this and vowed to get revenge. Rob became homeless, but Susi Harrison felt sorry for him and allowed him to stay at her house.

Meanwhile, Lucy felt isolated from her family and turned to Rob for support. He gave her tranquillisers. Rob then found out that his father died and took the news badly. He turned to heroin to get himself through. Despite Rob feeding Lucy's drug addiction, he began to put pressure on her by giving her an ultimatum—to choose him or the heroin. Rob was told he may have further problems with his leg and could end up losing it. To get back at Kurt, Rob managed to inject heroin into an already drugged-up Lucy. He took her to the roof of the car park where he was thrown off, and announced it was "payback time", leaving Lucy in a coma. Luckily, Kurt found her in just enough time and Lucy was taken to hospital. Kurt then followed Rob to France in a video special Hollyoaks: Off on one, where a scene between Rob and Kurt climaxes in Rob stealing a speedboat, and Kurt managing to climb on board just before he sped off. A fight ensued and Rob charged at Kurt who quickly stepped to one side, causing Rob to plunge into the water. Refusing to listen to Rob's pleas, Kurt drove off, leaving Rob floating in the middle of the Atlantic.

Rob then made a return to Hollyoaks village. This time he kidnapped Lucy and took her to a disused watertank. Ruth, Lewis and Tony came to rescue her. Despite Rob's attempts to drown Lucy, Tony stepped in to rescue her and all four of them got out safely. Rob briefly started dating Beth Morgan, but that came to an end when Beth overheard Lucy arguing with Rob about how he had ruined Lucy's and her family's life. During millennium eve, Rob tried setting a bus on fire, but he ended up dying in the blast.

== Reception ==
Rob was nominated for "Best Bad Guy" at the 1999 Inside Soap Awards. In October 1999, Merle Brown of the Daily Record branded Rob evil and said "Just when will he get his comeuppance and stop terrorising poor Lucy (Kerrie Taylor)?" What's on TV included Rob in their list of the 50 most evil soap villains of all time. They said "One of Hollyoaks' earliest villains, Rob Hawthorne (Warren De Rosa) got Lucy Benson hooked on drugs and tried to kill her. But he didn't bank on brother Kurt getting in his way..." During a feature on Hollyoaks psychos, E4 remembered Rob and said "Holding Lucy and gang hostage in a disused naval base - you can certainly credit Rob Hawthorne at being original! Not sure the harpoon was quite as effective as Toby's spanner though!" Rachel Tarley of the Metro placed Rob fifth in her list of the top five soap villains. Tarley said "A heroin addict and all-round bad guy, Rob was perhaps not the most original of soap villains, but he certainly knew how to strike fear into the heart of any young female in the Hollyoaks vicinity." In 2020, Tarley's colleague, Caroline Westbrook, called Rob "one of the more villainous characters of the early years" of Hollyoaks and believed that he definitely caused "a fair bit of trouble". Tina Baker, writing for Soaplife, said "rotten-to-the-core Rob" was gorgeous and looked like an angel, but he behaved like "a demented devil."

The episode where Rob tries to down Anna was reshown in 2020 as part of Hollyoaks@25, a spinoff series "showcasing some of the most talked-about storylines" of Hollyoaks.

== See also ==
- List of soap opera villains
