= Natasha Andersen =

UK soap opera character, created 1995

- Hollyoaks character
- Portrayed by: Shebah Ronay
- Duration: 1995–1996
- First appearance: 23 October 1995
- Last appearance: 11 March 1996
- Created by: Phil Redmond
- Introduced by: Phil Redmond
In-universe information
- Occupation: Barmaid (1995–1996); College student
- Father: Greg Andersen
- Mother: Jane Andersen
- Sisters: Sarah Andersen; Rebekah Anderson
- Grandfathers: Bert Andersen
- Grandmothers: Beryl Andersen
- Aunts: Celia Osborne
- First cousins: Ruth Osborne; Darren Osborne (adoptive)

Natasha Andersen is a fictional character from the British Channel 4 soap opera Hollyoaks, played by Shebah Ronay. She debuted on-screen during the episode airing on 23 October 1995. She was created by Phil Redmond as one of the serial's original characters.

== Development ==
=== Casting ===
Hollyoaks initially focused on the lives and loves of seven teenagers living in a fictional suburb of Chester. Natasha was one of the original characters created by Phil Redmond, and she was introduced in the show's first episode, which aired on 23 October 1995. Ronay had appeared in Reunion and The House of Eliott, before she went through "endless" auditions and won the role of Natasha. She admitted that she let out "a sigh of relief" upon learning he had been cast and celebrated with a bottle of champagne. Of the cast, she told Frank Loughlin of the Liverpool Echo: "I don't think anyone of us was prepared for it all. I am so excited about seeing the first episode and the reaction to. It's been so much fun – we have all worked very full days."

=== Characterisation ===
"Natasha, 17, is the ultimate babe. Blonde, beautiful and full of self-confidence, she is frequently the object of both lust and envy among her friends. She's at sixth form college working towards A levels and plans to go on to study Hotel and Leisure Management."

— Natasha's character outline published in the Chester Chronicle (October 1995).

Natasha is described as "sophisticated, glamorous and feisty". Natasha is described by British newspaper The Independent as being a snooty blonde and "gorgeous". They also go on to state that she is "unattainably posh". The Liverpool Echo described her as "One of the first Hollyoaks babes, she was sophisticated, glamorous and feisty and the love object of Kurt.

=== Departure and death ===
Her death was announced in January 1996 and was described as being "sensational scene in an attempt to boost ratings" and added that it would be different from "softer stories about teen romances and spots". In the serial's first year on air it received criticism for not having any issue led storylines and was branded soft. This prompted producers to develop a hard hitting storyline which involved Natasha, which would result in her death from the use of drugs. The storyline made front-page news and marked a change for the serial as they embarked on serious storylines. Of Natasha's exit Redmond stated: "Natasha's death depicts the stark reality of unnecessary death coming very close to one group of friendly and fun-loving people for the first time in their lives and how this is bound to change their outlook in many ways". Liverpool Echo described the storyline as "the drama's earliest controversial storyline featuring the much-publicised story when Natasha died on the dance floor after her drink was spiked."

== Storylines ==
Natasha was stunning, glamorous, sophisticated, pouty, feisty and a total princess as well as being the ultimate object of Kurt Benson's desires, who had instantly fallen for her. She was best friends with Maddie Parker, Dawn Cunningham and Louise Taylor. Natasha was the daughter of Greg and Jane Anderson and sister of Sarah. Her parents owned the pub. Despite having feelings for Kurt, who pursued her relentlessly, and attracted to his bad boy charm, Natasha refused to give in and decided to always play hard to get. This just made Kurt even more determined to win her heart. Natasha really never got a chance to confess to Kurt how she had really felt about him. Natasha had always given Kurt challenges to win her over, including the time when Natasha asked Kurt to choose between Christmas with her family or his own. Natasha won, but she lost interest when she saw Kurt bonding with her father. Natasha had gone with her dad to Italy for a while at that time Kurt and her cousin Ruth had met and bonded at the New Year's Eve party at the Bensons. When Natasha got back she started a new interest in Dermot, a guy in college with her.

However, at Kurt's sister Lucy's eighteenth birthday party, Natasha made the fatal mistake of agreeing to go to the party with Dermot, who wanted to give her a night she would never forget. Dermot and his friend Rob Hawthorne dropped a tablet into Natasha's drink hoping that she would lose all her inhibitions hoping get lucky with her. She then stormed the dance floor and suddenly collapsed in a heap. Natasha later died in hospital. After Natasha died her father, Greg, sold the pub to her aunt Celia and uncle Jack and moved to the states with Sarah and Jane. In January 2013, Darren mentions to Ruby that his cousin Natasha died from overdose drug, and have a fear of it due to Esther's attempted suicide from drugs since her death, and seven months later in September, it was revealed that Natasha and her sister Sarah were not real cousins with Darren.

== Reception ==
Lucy Ellmann of The Independent criticised Natasha because of her facial expressions and demure, stating: "Usually to be found at the bus-stop looking petulant (this is in fact her only look). She's unattainably posh, though she has pointed out to her one remaining parent (Alvin Stardust): "Fatha, Ay'm ova the age of consent." In the second episode she threw a glass of water over Kurt. Water. The age of consent is wasted on these people." Natasha's final episode was watched by 2.1 million viewers; at the time that was Hollyoaks biggest audience share to date. Francesca Babb from All About Soap branded Natasha "the original babe of the show".
