= Lucy Benson =

Fictional character from Hollyoaks

- Hollyoaks character
- Portrayed by: Kerrie Taylor
- Duration: 1995–2000
- First appearance: Episode 1; 23 October 1995
- Last appearance: Episode 405; 24 January 2000
- Created by: Phil Redmond
- Introduced by: Phil Redmond
In-universe information
- Father: Kirk Benson
- Mother: Julie Benson
- Brothers: Kurt Benson; Ollie Benson

Lucy Benson is a fictional character from the British Channel 4 soap opera Hollyoaks, played by Kerrie Taylor. Taylor appeared from the first episode on 23 October 1995. Taylor later quit the role with the character leaving in January 2000 when she went travelling. The character's storylines included a heroin addiction. The character has been described as a "good daughter" type who changed becoming a "hopeless addict".

== Casting ==
Taylor quit the role saying "I was scared to leave. I thought I might never work again, but the time was right". Taylor described her time on the serial as "happy" which made her decision to leave "hard". Taylor added that the Hollyoaks cast felt "like family". Taylor filmed her final scenes around Christmas 1999.

== Development ==
=== Characterisation ===
Merle Brown of the Daily Record labelled Lucy "troubled". Taylor felt the character had "gone through everything" saying she had taken the character from "a good daughter character on a journey to hopeless addict and then to strength again". The character was also labelled "hopeless" and a "junkie" by the Daily Record. The Daily Mirror labelled the character a "goody-two-shoes".

=== Addiction ===
Taylor commented on Lucy's heroin addiction, saying "it wasn't pleasant. I had this foundation I had to wear called Death Grey. Most foundations have girlie names, like Autumn Dew or Sunrise, but not this". Taylor commented on the storyline, saying "For 18 months, I'd go into work and play a heroin addict" which she found "challenging, but it did get to me after a while".

== Storylines ==
Lucy was introduced as part of the Benson family. Lucy begins dating Rob Hawthorne (Warren De Rosa). Lucy is involved in an accident which kills Dermot Ashton (Lauren Beales). Lucy tells the police of Rob's part in Dermot's death. After Lucy and Kurt seek revenge Rob is thrown off a car park roof by his drug dealers. Rob begins a vendetta against the Bensons. Lucy begins a band with Carol Groves (Natalie Casey) and Bazil McCourtney (Toby Sawyer).

Lucy's younger brother Ollie (Paul Leyshon) is killed in a car crash. Lucy blames herself for the accident, as she encouraged Kurt to chase after him. Lucy found it difficult to get over Ollie’s death, and ended up turning to Rob for support. He offers Lucy some tranquillisers to get her through difficult times. Lucy becomes addicted and Rob decides to begin giving Lucy heroin. Lucy is put in a coma. Lucy's brother Kurt (Jeremy Edwards) confronts Rob, leaving him stranded in the Atlantic Ocean as revenge. Lucy awakes and finally weans herself off heroin. However, Rob returns claiming to have killed Kurt. He traps Lucy, Lewis Richardson (Ben Hull), Ruth Osborne (Terri Dwyer) and Tony Hutchinson (Nick Pickard) in a watertank where they nearly die. Rob tries to set fire to Rory Finnigan's (James Redmond) bus but is trapped inside, perishing in the fire.

Lucy decides that she wants to travel the world and Tony offers to go with her. As Tony became increasingly preoccupied with researching tropical diseases, Lucy began to realise that he really did not want to leave Hollyoaks and told him he should stay in Chester. As Lucy and Tony bid farewell at the airport, Tony promises Lucy that he would wait for her.

== Reception ==
For her portrayal of Lucy, Taylor was nominated for Best Actress at the Inside Soap Awards of 1998. Taylor was then nominated for Best Dramatic Performance at the 1999 British Soap Awards. While expressing her disinterest, Merle Brown from the Daily Record did not welcome Lucy's drug habit being a heavily focused upon storyline. Charlie Catchpole of the Daily Mirror commented on the performances of soap actors giving his opinion on what they should be paid. On Taylor, he said she would be in his bottom paid soap stars saying she deserved £15,000, which if given to Lucy, she would use for "a new silver spoon for her nose. She's tried every drug bar aspirin". In 2018, writing about addiction storylines across British soap operas, Laura Morgan of Digital Spy listed Lucy's drug addiction storyline as one of the eight "darkest" addiction plots to be featured in a soap.
