= Kurt Benson =

Fictional character from Hollyoaks

- Hollyoaks character
- Portrayed by: Jeremy Edwards
- Duration: 1995–1999, 2020
- First appearance: 23 October 1995
- Last appearance: 10 December 2020
- Created by: Phil Redmond
- Introduced by: Phil Redmond (1995); Bryan Kirkwood (2020)
- Spin-off appearances: Hollyoaks: Off on One (1998); Hollyoaks Later (2013)
- Crossover appearances: Brookside (1998)
In-universe information
- Father: Kirk Benson
- Mother: Juliette Benson
- Brothers: Ollie Benson
- Sisters: Lucy Benson
- Wife: Ruth Osborne (1997–1999)

Kurt Benson is a fictional character from the British television soap opera Hollyoaks, played by Jeremy Edwards. He debuted on-screen during the episode airing on 23 October 1995. He was created by Phil Redmond as one of the serial's original characters. Despite the character's supposed death in 1999, Kurt returned in 2020 as part of the celebrations for the 25th anniversary, with the explanation being that he faked his death.

== Development ==
=== Characterisation ===
Kurt is part of the show's Benson family which includes Kurt and his younger siblings Lucy Benson (Kerrie Taylor) and Ollie Benson (Paul Leyshon). Kurt is described as having "two passions in his life – his motorbike and his music". Kurt is "intent on achieving just two things – becoming a rockstar and getting his hands on the desirable Natasha!" Kurt is described as being "despaired at [Tony's] submissive nature" while his brother Ollie is described as the "constant bane of his life". Kurt is described by British newspaper The Independent as being the Alpha male. They also go on to state: "A clean-cut guitarist with a quiff of dark hair and jeans that are unpleasantly loose, bagged together by a tight belt. He's chased by a panda car wherever he goes, though it's not clear what he's done wrong." MSN described him as the serial's "original bad boy". Virgin Media described him as "good looking, cheeky and often in trouble with the police, but everyone loved him". The Daily Record described him as a "rebel- without-a-cause". The Liverpool Echo described him as "heart throb" and said "He was a motorcycle-loving rock star-in-waiting." The Independent described him as "cool-guy Kurt". A writer from the show's official website described Kurt as "the Hollyoaks original bad boy".

=== Relationship with Ruth Osborne ===
Writers created a relationship storyline between Kurt and Ruth Osborne (Terri Dwyer). When Kurt finds Spike (Jack Deam) manhandling Ruth, he attacks Spike. The fight ends with Spike being taken to hospital and Kurt is arrested for attempted murder. Kurt faces the prospect of fifteen years in prison if he is found guilty. A trial date is set and Kurt decides to use his possible final two months of freedom to marry Ruth. Edwards told Steven Murphy from Inside Soap that "the wedding was a desperation thing, it's a reinforcement of their love, trust and friendship. It's the ultimate 'I believe in you to the point that I will forsake all others'."

Edwards described his character as "very nervous" about the trial and struggled to cope with the "tough" scenario. Spike enlists witness Gary Watson (James Murray) exaggerate the events of the fight to ensure Kurt is found guilty. Kurt confides in Ruth about his fears about the trial. Edwards explained that "I really don't think Kurt could cope if he had to go to prison, he's already told Ruth that it'll kill him if he goes to jail."

=== Departure ===
In Kurt's final scenes he informs best friend Tony Hutchinson (Nick Pickard) he is leaving. The scene featured Tony in a comedic scene with lard on his head because they thought he was going bald. Despite the scene being comedic, Tony becomes emotional to lose his friend. The show's executive producer Jo Hallows told Wendy Granditer from Inside Soap that it was her "absolute favourite" moment of Hollyoaks. She noted it was a "silly storyline" but Pickard's performance made her cry. She added Kurt was one of the first "major characters" to leave the show and "it was the end of an era."

== Storylines ==
Kurt was friends with Tony and Jambo Bolton and had his heart set on winning Natasha Andersen as his girlfriend. Tragedy struck before the two could really get together, and her death started a deadly feud with Rob Hawthorne. Kurt moved on to Natasha's cousin Ruth, and after a rocky start to their relationship, they ended up getting married. As a result, Kurt and Ruth became icons for all teenagers in love, demonstrating that love can conquer all. Their decision to marry was provoked by the trouble Kurt had got himself into after injuring Spike. Kurt had caught Spike making a play for Ruth and, in his attempt to protect her, he pushed Spike, causing him to fall from the scaffolding. As a result, Kurt was accused of attempted murder and was certain that he would be found guilty. He took off to Hull, sensing that Ruth doubted his innocence.

Ruth went in pursuit of him, however, and they decided to make the ultimate commitment to each other and got married, incurring the wrath of their parents when they returned home. When Kurt was found not guilty, the couple began to enjoy life as newly weds, although they knew that things would never be easy. Kurt handed Rob over to the mercy of his drug dealers, who threw him from the roof of a car park. Rob never forgave Kurt, and began a long and drawn out plan to exact revenge. Rob's plan culminated in getting Kurt's sister Lucy hooked on heroin and, when she fell into a drug-induced coma, Kurt took matters into his own hands and followed Rob to France. After a dramatic chase and confrontation, he left Rob floating in the middle of the Atlantic, announcing that fate would decide his destiny.

As Lucy slowly recovered from her ordeal, Kurt and Ruth's marriage hit a rocky patch and they both began to wonder whether they had made a mistake marrying so young. Ruth was determined to make it work, but Kurt soon found himself tempted by the alluring Kate Patrick and started an affair. Ruth found out about Kurt's infidelity and threw him out, but he managed to persuade her that he had made a terrible mistake and she eventually took him back. Kurt's decision to leave was prompted by a violent outburst when he caught Kate trying to drown Ruth in the swimming pool. He tried to teach Kate a lesson by holding her head under water, and almost drowned her in the process. Ruth was shocked by his violent reaction, this was a Kurt she barely recognised. Kurt and Ruth break-up and he promises Ruth that he would always be her friend. Six months later Kurt was killed in a jet ski accident. Lucy believed the accident had been caused by Rob but it turned out to have been a random hit and run. Rob had only told people he killed Kurt to taunt them.

Kurt returned in Hollyoaks Later in 2013, fourteen years after his last appearance. He appeared as a vision in Tony's mind, and protecting Tony's son Harry Thompson from danger. On the 25th anniversary in 2020, Kurt returned to Hollyoaks, giving best friend Tony, who believed Kurt to be long dead, a fright. Kurt explained that he had faked his death and had come back to put things right. He started a relationship with Tony's sister Verity Hutchinson and it soon became clear he was setting out to scam his friends to pay off a debt, swindling Darren Osborne and Mandy Richardson out of their life savings with a fake business venture. With his scam exposed, Kurt came to realisation that his time was up and he decided to flee the village, he gave Tony a pep talk about who he is and what he stands for before speeding out of the village on his bike once more as Tony watches his best friend leave.

== Reception ==
Merle Brown from the Daily Record commented on the character's (presumed) death, saying "When there's a problem with a character in Hollyoaks, they just kill them off." A columnist for LGBT website AfterElton said that Kurt was the serial's original "bad boy" and "trouble had a way of following" him. They opined he had good looks and a "lovable cheeky charm and never short of female attention". Elizabeth Joyce of the Shropshire Star said that Kurt was a "decent" and "genuinely memorable character" who still has "a place in the heart of many a late-twentysomething" Dominic Moffitt from Manchester Evening News called Kurt "the original hot rod of the Hollyoaks world." Inside Soap highlighted Kurt's 2020 return as "What went wrong" of that year in Hollyoaks, writing, "Yes, that moment he came back from the dead was a shocker, but his return pretty much amounted to nothing. We'd rather he just lived on in our memories."
