= Gordon Cunningham =

UK soap opera character, created 1996

- Hollyoaks character
- Portrayed by: Uncredited (1995); Bernard Latham (1996–2008)
- Duration: 1995–2004, 2008
- First appearance: 23 October 1995
- Last appearance: 3 December 2004
- Created by: Phil Redmond
- Introduced by: Phil Redmond (1995); Bryan Kirkwood (2008)
- Spin-off appearances: Hollyoaks: The Good, the Bad and the Gorgeous (2009)
In-universe information
- Occupation: Businessman
- Family: Cunningham
- Father: Cyril Cunningham
- Wife: Angela Cunningham (until 1994); Helen Cunningham (1999–2004)
- Sons: Max Cunningham; Tom Cunningham
- Daughters: Dawn Cunningham; Jude Cunningham; Cindy Cunningham
- Stepsons: Lewis Richardson
- Stepdaughters: Mandy Richardson
- Grandsons: Alfie Nightingale; Hilton Cunningham; Maddox Keane
- Granddaughters: Bethany Cunningham; Holly Cunningham; Steph Cunningham-Lomax
- First cousins: Benny Stringer

Gordon Cunningham (commonly referred to as Mr. C) is a fictional character from the British television soap opera Hollyoaks. He appeared in the series' first episode on 23 October 1995, played by an uncredited walk-on actor and was played by Bernard Latham, who took over the role in 25 March 1996 . He departed on 16 February 2004 when Gordon died of a heart attack following a car crash. He last appeared for a brief return on 11 July 2008 during a dream sequence broadcast on T4.

== Development ==
Latham joined the cast in January 1996 and he was originally expected to appear in six episodes, where his character would come in and complain about his daughter Dawn Cunningham's (Lisa Williamson) behaviour. Latham thought his character's shouting and bullying ways made him a bit one-dimensional, so he tried bringing some comedy to the role by elongating his Northern vowels and "lightening him up a bit." Latham believed that the producers liked what they saw and realised that they could do more with the character, so they kept him on and he became one of the "best-loved faces in the show."

In 2004, Latham decided to leave the show to spend more time with his family and the character of Gordon received "a tragic exit" when he was killed off following a car crash. Latham was pleased with the producer's decision to kill Gordon that way, saying "I'm very lucky to be given such a good exit. I didn't want Mr C to just wave goodbye and head off in the back of a taxi, because he deserved a dramatic exit with a devastating aftermath - and that's what he got." Latham thought Gordon's "worst story line" was his wife Helen Cunningham's (Kathryn George) affair with Tony Hutchinson (Nick Pickard). He believed the plot did not suit his character and thought it was the "beginning of the end for him."

In a 2009 non-canon special entitled Hollyoaks: The Good, the Bad and the Gorgeous, Latham returns to reprise the role of Gordon once again from beyond the grave, where he runs a cinema showing previous Hollyoaks clips.

== Storylines ==
Gordon comforts his daughter Dawn when she struggles to fend off the advances of her mother's new boyfriend, Terry Williams. Gordon tries to help his ex-wife, Angela overcome her crippling debts and tries to inject some discipline into the lives of their wayward children. Gordon soon builds up a witty repartee with Tony Hutchinson, when he becomes landlord of Got it Taped, and finds himself in various scrapes in his desperate attempts to keep Max and Cindy on the straight and narrow. However, things get bad for Gordon as he discover that Cindy was pregnant, and loses Dawn to leukaemia, and also is saddened when Jude runs off the next year after getting herself in trouble with the police.

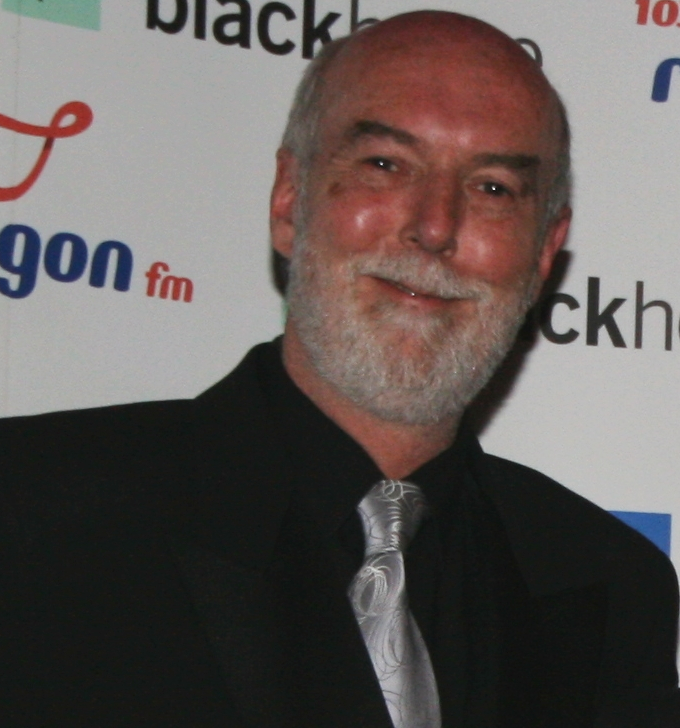
Bernard Latham played Gordon for nine years

Gordon opens his own mini supermarket called Drive 'n' Buy. He rediscovers the joys of romance later in life, falling for the recently divorced Helen Richardson. When he discovers that Helen is pregnant with his child, he does the honourable thing and asks her to marry him. With Helen come her children, Mandy and Lewis Richardson, promoting the merging of the Cunningham and Richardson families. Soon, Gordon becomes "Councillor of Chester", after he beats tough competition from Tony and Matt Musgrove. With the Richardson family comes considerable angst, culminating in Lewis's suicide, yet Gordon proves himself as the rock to his wife and together they have a son called Tom. Gordon began to become self-conscious. After he turns fifty, he begins a 'new look' to make himself look younger with the help of student, Nick O'Connor.

Gordon's world ruptures when Max tells him that Helen is having an affair with Tony. Gordon is shattered even more when Helen decides to leave him for Tony, but Gordon is convinced that Helen will come back to him. Struggling to cope without Helen, Gordon receives comfort from David "Bombhead" Burke. Gordon becomes a father figure to Bombhead. Eventually, Helen returns to Gordon and with some match fixing from Mandy and Max, the pair are reunited. However, tragedy strikes for Gordon when he has a heart attack and ends up crashing his car. Helen and Tom are also in the car and Helen is injured. Gordon dies in hospital leaving the family devastated. Helen then dies a few days later from an undetected internal injury and Tom is left as an orphan. In Helen and Gordon's wills, Tom is supposed to live with Mandy but instead he goes to live with Max. Bombhead takes the news of Gordon's death badly. When his mum dies, he starts to see Gordon's ghost (reprised by Bernard Latham) who tries to convince him to tell his friends about his mum's death and that he needs help. After he gets help, his visions of Gordon's ghost stop. Max dies on 27 June 2008. In a short dream sequence skit shown on T4 after the omnibus edition, Max is reunited with Gordon in heaven. Whilst father and son are overcome with emotion at being reunited, Max tells his father that he has sold Drive 'n' Buy. Gordon's joy of the reunion vanishes, as he smacks Max around the head and calls him a "berk".

== Reception ==
At the 2002 Inside Soap Awards, Gordon and Helen were nominated for Best Couple. In response to Gordon and Helen being killed off in their car crash storyline, Sam Soap from Inside Soap thought it was "great" and wished that producers had also killed off the entire Cunningham family because of their "grumpy faces".
