= Davinia Taylor =

English actress (born 1977)

- Born: Davinia Murphy; 11 November 1977 (age 48); Wigan, England
- Other name: Davinia Murphy
- Children: 4

Davinia Taylor (born Davinia Murphy; 11 November 1977) is an English actress, socialite and interior designer, best known for playing Jude Cunningham in the soap opera Hollyoaks.

== Career ==
Taylor starred in Channel 4 soap opera Hollyoaks, playing party girl Jude Cunningham from 1996 to 1998.

The original Hollyoaks part led to roles in the television movies Bostock's Cup, Is Harry on the Boat?, the comedic film, Soul Patrol, as well as a spot on an episode of Urban Gothic, presenting work on The Big Breakfast and Top of the Pops @ Play and an appearance in the documentary series Young, Hot and Talented for Channel 5.

Taylor opened her own hair and beauty salon 'Taylor Made' in London in March 2011.

In 2016 Taylor returned to Hollyoaks after an 18-year absence.

== Personal life ==
Taylor's father, Alan Murphy, a multi-millionaire, ran the AM Paper toilet roll factory in Skelmersdale.

Taylor has frequently been featured in the British tabloid press, as part of the Primrose Hill set with Sadie Frost (actress and ex-wife of Jude Law), and supermodel Kate Moss.
