= Jo Hallows =

British television producer and director

- Born: Jo Hallows
- Occupation: TV Producer
- Years active: 1995–present
- Television: Hollyoaks

Jo Hallows is a British television producer and director, best known for her work on the Channel 4 soap opera Hollyoaks and the BBC drama series Grange Hill. Hallows was also Head of Drama Production at Mersey TV.

== Career ==
Hallows worked as Head of Drama Production at Mersey TV. Hallows was also producer of Grange Hill in 2003.

=== Hollyoaks ===
Hallows began work on Hollyoaks in 1995 and joined the show from its ninth episode. Hallows served as the show's series producer until 2005, when she served as an executive producer, alongside programme creator Phil Redmond. Hallows was responsible for Hollyoaks: Breaking Boundaries, which saw the rape of long-term character Luke Morgan, which was the first time male rape was tackled in a soap. Hallows worked closely with advisers from rape-related support groups to help her make the storyline realistic. Hallows was responsible for killing off Lewis Richardson in her time on the show, which occurred in Hollyoaks: Movin' On. Hallows also worked on Hollyoaks: After Hours. Hallows was responsible for the increase in late-night specials, which proved popular with viewers, so she decided to respond to requests for more. Hallows also worked on Hollyoaks: On the Pull and Hollyoaks: Let Loose. David Hanson later joined the show as a series producer in late 2005, and both Hallows and Redmond departed a few episodes afterward. While on the show, Hollyoaks received a nomination for the Royal Television Society Award, which Hallows felt was rewarding.
