= Matt Littler =

British actor, director (born 1982)

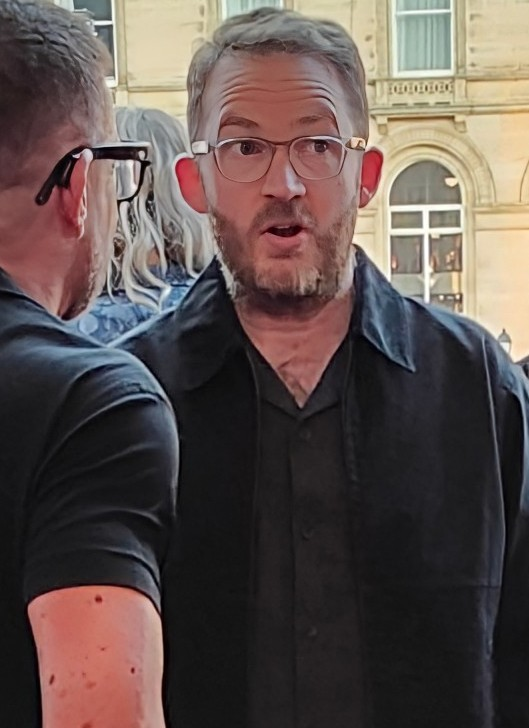
- Littler in 2025
- Born: 19 March 1982 (age 44); Bury, Greater Manchester, England
- Occupation: Actor/ director
- Years active: 1996–present
- Spouse: Jayne Mahon (2012–present)

Matt Littler (born 19 March 1982) is a British actor and director born in Bury, Greater Manchester, United Kingdom. He is most famous for playing the role Max Cunningham from 1997 to 2008 in the British Channel 4 soap opera Hollyoaks.

== Career ==
Littler is most notable for his role on the British soap opera Hollyoaks in which he played Max Cunningham, a role he held for 11 years before his character's death in June 2008. He decided to leave the show with his on/off-screen best friend Sam "O.B." O'Brien, played by Darren Jeffries, who left the show a few months earlier, and later returned for Max's departure. Max was one of the longest running characters on the show. On ITV's This Morning show, Matt revealed that he will be returning to Hollyoaks to direct a few episodes.

Since leaving Littler spent some years co-presenting many popular TV shows with Darren Jeffries these include 4Music programme Orange RockCorps, The Versus Chart, Freshly Squeezed, T4 Stars, T4 on the Beach, RedBull Rivals, The Hollyoaks Music show and The Gadget Show. Other appearances have been on Big Brother's Big Mouth and Only Fools on Horses, also on many panel shows, such as Celebrity Juice, and 9 out of 10 cats. The Duo also hosted Gadget Show Live at the NEC in Birmingham, MineCon, RuneFest, and the popular Insomnia iSeries for many years. In 2007 Littler had a role in director Neil Carroll's For King and Country, he also provided the voice of Arthur Glemore in TellTale Game's adaptation of The Game Of Thrones, as well as many other audio books and video games. Throughout 2013 he hosted The British Soap Awards spin-off show on ITV2 alongside Jeffries, Zoe Hardman and Joe Swash, presented a Text Santa spin-off show for ITV, and throughout 2014, guest presented The Gadget Show numerous times for Channel 5.

Littler co-founded Liverpool based production company, "Roll Camera" with Craig Forster. With the company Littler directed and produced a music video for the band GK and the Renegades.

In his independent directing role, Littler wrote, directed and acted in a short film in 2008 called Kidnap, which also starred a number of Hollyoaks actors, as well as music videos for Esco Williams and other North West artists. Since then he has worked as a director for Channel 4 and Channel 5, and produced pilots for Lime Pictures and Pulse Films.

More Recently Littler has focused on producing and directing, working on several short form films for Channel 4, reality TV pilots for Lime Pictures, and working for a stint at ITV providing the voice of ITV2, whilst writing scripts for continuity announcements. Late in 2015 Littler joined London based innovation agency Brandwidth as head of moving image, the company makes content for the likes of Disney, Apple and others, at Brandwidth Littler has focused in Virtual Reality, and has produced content for many high-profile clients – Disney, Royal Caribbean, and The PGA Tour. He was present at Cannes Lions in 2016 at the Nokia Ozo stand, a company with which Brandwidth is a commercial partner.

== Awards ==
British Soap Awards

- Best On-Screen Partnership (with Darren Jeffries) – 2008

National Television Awards

- Outstanding Serial Drama Performance – 2008
