= Ben Hull =

British actor and television presenter

- Born: 8 November 1972 (age 53)
- Occupations: Actor, Director, Filmmaker and Presenter
- Years active: 1989–present
- Spouse: Anna Acton

Ben Hull (born 8 November 1972) is an English actor, director, filmmaker and presenter.

== Actor ==
Hull's first appearance was in 1994 when he appeared in the ITV drama Revelations. He then went on to appear as Martin Wells in Children's ITV series Children's Ward. In 1995 he got his big break playing Lewis Richardson in the Channel 4 soap Hollyoaks, a role which he also played in a couple of the soap's spin-off TV series Hollyoaks: Movin' On and Hollyoaks: Breaking Boundaries; he left this role in 2001.

In 2002 he starred in another of Channel 4's soaps, the now defunct Brookside, playing Dr Gary Parr, but this was not Hull's first appearance in the soap, as a few years before he played a character called Syd Watts in one of the soap's spin-off videos, Brookside: Double Take. In 2003 he joined the BBC One medical drama Casualty for 3 episodes, playing Dale Charters. Hull returned to soap operas when, in 2005, he joined Five's (now Channel 5) now defunct Family Affairs, playing Adam Green, and in 2006 he starred in BBC One's daytime soap Doctors, playing John Myson. In 2007 it was announced that Hull would be starring in all 50 episodes of new ITV1 TV series The Royal Today, which is a modern day spin-off from ITV1's 1960s TV series The Royal, playing Charge nurse Adam Fernley. The series was aired in 2008. Hull has appeared in BBC One drama series Missing.

In 2012, Hull appeared in new ITV crime drama Crime Stories, playing series regular Detective Ben Shaw. The show concentrates on police procedure and blends documentary camera technique with CCTV images. 2012 also saw Hull play Consultant Obstetrician Derwood Thompson in the BBC's medical drama Holby City. He reprised the role in 2013 and 2018. In 2022, Hull appeared as Jack in the third series of Ricky Gervais' After Life. In March 2023, Hull appeared as buyer Owen Longford in Coronation Street.

Hull has also appeared in many theatre productions including Four Knights in Knaresborough and Cat on a Hot Tin Roof, both of which he was nominated for a Best Actor award in the Manchester Evening News Theatre Awards. In 2008 Hull starred as Garry Lejeune in a UK touring production of Noises Off.

== Director and Filmmaker ==
In 2014, Hull established 'Electric Reels', a videography production company specialising in creating bespoke corporate videos.

Hull has Directed, Produced, filmed and edited many short films and documentaries. His collaborations with Olympian Professor Greg Whyte OBE have seen his sports documentaries win many international film festival awards.

In 2019 Hull and Whyte created 'Extraordinary People - the burns victim and the Bosphorus'. Conceived as a 20 minute television pilot show, it told the story of Sylvia Macgregor, a burns survivor and disability campaigner who Whyte trained to coached to face the biggest physical challenge of her life: to swim from Asia to Europe along the Bosphorus River in Turkey.

Also in 2019, Hull Directed 'Weave Wars', a short horror- comedy film written by and starring his former 'Holby City' co-star, Chizzy Akudolu.

In 2020, Hull worked with actor and writer Paul Sloss in directing comedy drama short film 'Out!', which starred both Sloss and actress Pauline McLynn. Also that year, Hull Directed 'Black & Whyte - A Norseman Story' which followed Professor Greg Whyte as he prepared and competed in the 'Norseman' extreme triathlon in Norway, often described as 'the toughest triathlon on the planet'.

In 2023, Hull and Whyte collaborated again on 'Unstoppable - Inside the mind of the extreme triathlete'. The project saw Whyte prepare for 'Patagonman' - another extreme triathlon, but the 2019 Coronovirus Pandemic meant the race was cancelled. Hull and Whyte turned this setback into the narrative of the film, which became about triumph over adversity. Hull and Whyte plotted their own extreme triathlon route in North West Scotland, along the same route as the 'Celtman' extreme triathlon.

In 2024, Hull and Whyte collaborated again on a new project: 'Whyte Water' which told the story of Whyte's attempt to swim 125 miles of the Upper Thames in a Guinness World Record time of four and a half days.

== Presenter ==
Hull's work as a presenter includes Film24, Bid, Angela and Friends, Gala TV, the competitions for This Morning and for Travel Channel (UK). He has also presented for the Army Recruiting Channel's "Ask the Army", and for the last ten years has presented the safety series 'RED' for the Rail Safety and Standards Board.

== Personal life ==
Hull is married to actress and former Family Affairs co-star Anna Acton.

== Filmography ==
Year	Show	Role	Notes
1994	Revelations	Nick	3 episodes
1994	The Ward	Martin	Series regular
1995	Casualty	Nick Harvey	Episode: "Compensation"
1995	Coronation Street	Mark Lacey	1 episode
1995–2001	Hollyoaks	Lewis Richardson	24 episodes
2000	Hollyoaks: Breaking Boundaries	Lewis Richardson	Feature length special
2001	Hollyoaks: Movin' On	Lewis Richardson	16 part series
2002–2003	Brookside	Gary Parr	21 episodes
2003–2004	Casualty	Dale Charters	Episodes: "I Got It Bad and That Ain't Good" "Ahead of the Game" "Where There's Life..."
2005	Family Affairs	Adam Green	Series regular
2006	Doctors	John Myson	Episode: "The Tick Tock Man"
2008	The Royal Today	Adam Fearnley	50 episodes
2009	Missing	Sam Winter	Episode: "1.5"
2009	Doctors	Pete Kingsland	Episode: "Sorrow's Gift"
2009	Holby City	Greg Brady	Episode: "The Spirit Dancing"
2011	Doctors	Charles Garland	Episode: "The Lonely Woman"
2011	Little Crackers	Builder	Episode: "Barbara Windsor's Little Cracker: My First Brassiere"
2012–2018	Holby City	Derwood Thompson	Recurring role
2012	Crime Stories	Detective Ben Shaw	Series regular
2012–2013	South Park	Filmore (voice)/ Black Vamp (voice)	2 episodes
2015	Casualty	Derwood Thompson	Episode: "The Road Not Taken"
2017	The Evermoor Chronicles	Jed Crossley	12 episodes
2022	After Life	Jack	Series 3 Episode 5
2023	Coronation Street	Owen Longford	Recurring role
