= Kerrie Taylor =

British actress (born 1973)

- Born: 1973 (age 52–53); Romsey, Hampshire, England
- Occupation: Actress
- Television: Hollyoaks; Where The Heart Is

Kerrie Taylor (born 1973) is a British actress from Romsey, Hampshire.

== Career ==
Taylor is best known for the role of Beth Enright/Beresford on the ITV family drama Where the Heart Is, a role she played for four years, leaving in 2005.

She is also well known for her five-year role as Lucy Benson in the soap opera Hollyoaks, from the series start in October 1995 to January 2000. Other acting credits include Crossroads, Heartbeat, Clocking Off, Fallen, Casualty and most recently a role in BBC daytime serial drama Doctors. She also presents for the fashion brand Annalee+Hope on Sky digital shopping channel QVC.

== Education ==
Kerrie Taylor studied drama at Manchester Metropolitan University's School of Theatre.

== Personal life ==
She is married to journalist Jason Farrell.
