= Terri Dwyer =

British actress and TV presenter (born 1973)

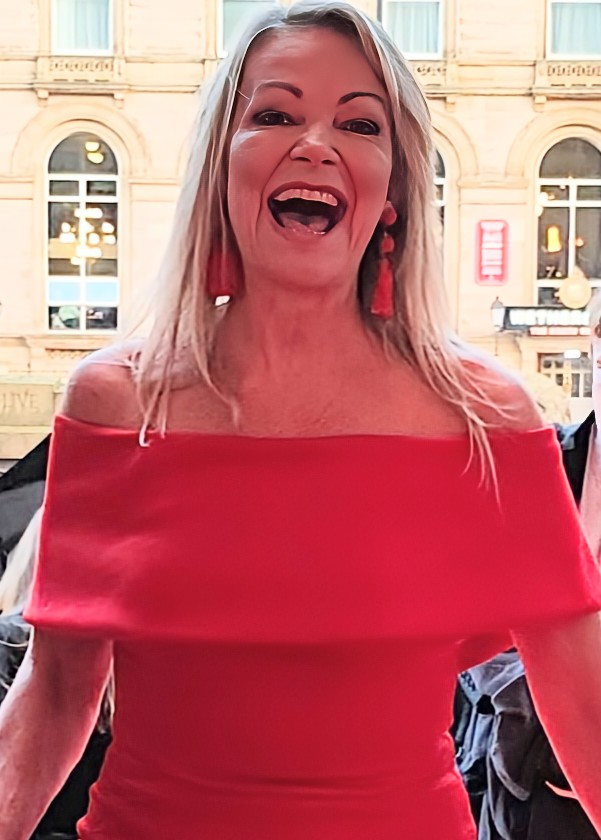
- Dwyer in 2025
- Born: Teresa Dwyer; 31 July 1973 (age 53); Syston, Leicestershire, England
- Occupations: Television presenter, actress, model
- Years active: 1995–2012, 2024–present
- Spouse: Sean Marley (m. 2004)
- Children: 2

Teresa "Terri" Dwyer (born 31 July 1973) is a British television presenter and actress, best known for her role as Ruth Osborne in the British soap opera Hollyoaks. She has also presented the ITV home makeover show 60 Minute Makeover.

== Career ==
Terri Dwyer began her career as a model and in 1995 won the part of Ruth Osborne in the British soap opera Hollyoaks, making her first appearance in January 1996. After leaving Hollyoaks in 2001, she participated in the Channel 4 reality tv show The Games and went on to win a gold medal. That same year, she appeared on Lily Savage's Blankety Blank. She appeared as a guest co-presenter of The Big Breakfast in January 2001 during "Guest Presenter Week" with Natalie Casey.

In 2003, Dwyer briefly returned to Hollyoaks and also became a regular presenter on the ITV programme Loose Women (2003–2006). In 2005, she joined the cast of Grange Hill, playing the part of teacher Miss Adams. In June 2006, Dwyer helped ITV Play launch a new show: Rovers Return Quiz Night. She was one of the main presenters on the programme, alongside Paul Hendy.

Dwyer left ITV Play in June 2006, after accepting the job as main presenter on ITV's 60 Minute Makeover, taking over from fellow Loose Women star Claire Sweeney, who left to join a theatre production. Dwyer later left the show as part of a cost-cutting exercise by ITV.

In 2007, she co-presented Coronation Street/Emmerdale Confidential on ITV alongside Jeremy Edwards (who played the husband of Dwyer's character in Hollyoaks).

Dwyer also made a guest appearance on comedy Bo' Selecta in 2002.

Dwyer also appeared in a one-off episode (episode 12) of the series Mile High. She played the role of a passenger within a group of people who share a fear of flying.

Dwyer made regular appearances on This Morning from 2010 until 2012.

== Personal life ==
Dwyer has an older sister, Tina, an older brother, Tony, and a younger brother, Terry. Her mother, Doreen, died of ovarian cancer in 1996, and her father, Tony, died of stomach cancer in 2003. She nearly died in a car crash in 1991.

Dwyer married Sean Marley at Dalmeny village church, near Edinburgh, on 5 September 2004. She nearly missed her own wedding, as she was stuck in traffic. Dwyer gave birth to her first child, a son named Caiden Ajay Marley, in Birkenhead, Merseyside, on 1 March 2006. She gave birth to her second son, Kylan James Marley, on 3 November 2009.

== Filmography ==
TV

- Hollyoaks (1996–2001, 2003–2004, 2008) – Ruth Osborne
- The Big Breakfast (2001) – Guest co-presenter
- The Games (2003) – Contestant
- Loose Women (2003–2006) – Panellist
- Grange Hill (2005) – Miss Adams
- Rovers Return Quiz Night (2006) – Co-presenter
- 60 Minute Makeover (2007–2009) – Presenter
- This Morning (2010–2012) – Various roles
- Supacell (2024) – Gloria (Rodney’s mum)

Film

- Break as Cathy – also acted as producer
