= Hollyoaks Favourites =

British television series

- Genre: Soap opera
- Starring: Lists of characters
- Country of origin: United Kingdom
- Original language: English

Production
- Camera setup: Multiple-camera setup
- Running time: 30 minutes

Original release
- Network: E4
- Release: 29 March 2020 – 15 January 2021

Related
- Hollyoaks

Hollyoaks Favourites is a British television series that aired on E4 from 29 March 2020 to 15 January 2021. The series shows past episodes of Channel 4 soap opera Hollyoaks and was launched as a response to production on Hollyoaks being suspended due to the COVID-19 pandemic, in order to fill the slot of new episodes. The series concluded on 15 January 2021, when the series returned to transmitting five weekly episodes.

== Production ==
On 22 March 2020, Channel 4 suspended production and filming of Hollyoaks due to the COVID-19 pandemic. A decision was made to air classic episodes from 30 March, new episodes being broadcast was reduced from five to three, airing on Monday, Tuesday and Wednesday. However, on 6 April, this was reduced again from three to two, airing Monday and Tuesday.

The slots were known as Hollyoaks Favourites and each show is presented by a cast member that their character was key to the episode. Once there were enough episodes of Hollyoaks filmed, Hollyoaks Favourites was replaced by Hollyoaks as it was intended to be a stopgap during the pandemic. In July 2020, Hollyoaks Favourites was replaced by Hollyoaks@25, a series that explores moments from the first 25 years of the soap.

== Episodes ==
Favourites air date	Original air date	Episode information	Host
2 April 2020	18 June 2013	Mercedes McQueen's (Jennifer Metcalfe) Fourth Trip Down the Aisle.	Jorgie Porter
3 April 2020	19 June 2013	Mercedes McQueen's (Jennifer Metcalfe) marry Doctor Browning (Joseph Thompson).	Jorgie Porter
8 April 2020	24 January 2017	Cameron Campbell (Cameron Moore) holds his family hostage.	Kieron Richardson
9 April 2020	18 May 2016	"Gloved Hand Killer" Lindsey Butterfield (Sophie Austin) vs Silas Blissett (Jeff Rawle).	Kieron Richardson
10 April 2020	25 June 2019	Laurie Shelby (Kyle Pryor) gets his comeuppance.	Kieron Richardson
15 April 2020	25 September 2018	Mandy Richardson (Sarah Jayne Dunn) and Darren Osborne's (Ashley Taylor Dawson) affair is revealed.	Jorgie Porter
16 April 2020	20 March 2013	Brendan Brady's (Emmett J. Scanlan) childhood abuse at the hands of Seamus Brady (Fintan McKeown) is uncovered leads to Cheryl Brady (Bronagh Waugh) killing Seamus.	Kieron Richardson
17 April 2020	1 November 2019	Cleo McQueen (Nadine Rose Mulkerrin) discovers Mitchell Deveraux (Imran Adams) and Scott Drinkwell's (Ross Adams) affair.	Jorgie Porter
22 April 2020	11 November 2014	Sienna Blake (Anna Passey), Maxine Minniver (Nikki Sanderson) and Patrick Blake's (Jeremy Sheffield) car chase plus Porsche McQueen (Twinnie Lee Moore) and Lockie Campbell's (Nick Rhys) wedding.	Kieron Richardson
23 April 2020	12 November 2014	Wedding reception train crashes into Maxine Minniver's (Nikki Sanderson) car.	Kieron Richardson
24 April 2020	18 October 2017	Aftermath of Yasmine Maalik (Haiesha Mistry) and Peri Lomax (Ruby O'Donnell) discovering Lily Drinkwell (Lauren McQueen) has been self-harming.	Ruby O'Donnell
29 April 2020	15 August 2013	Nancy Osborne's (Jessica Fox) Rooftop Car Crash.	Jessica Fox
30 April 2020	13 December 2013	Nancy Osborne (Jessica Fox) discovers Sienna Blake's (Anna Passey) fake pregnancy.	Anna Passey
1 May 2020	10 October 2018	Cleo McQueen (Nadine Rose Mulkerrin) and Joel Dexter's (Rory Douglas-Speed) wedding is stopped when Cleo is rushed to hospital with bulimia nervosa.	Jorgie Porter
6 May 2020	6 March 2018	Lily Drinkwell (Lauren McQueen) and Prince McQueen's (Malique Thompson-Dwyer) Wedding.	Jorgie Porter
7 May 2020	30 July 2014	Patrick Blake (Jeremy Sheffield) and Maxine Minniver's (Nikki Sanderson) wedding ends when Maxine reveals Patrick abused her.	Jorgie Porter
8 May 2020	25 May 2016	Trevor Royle (Greg Wood) gets stabbed by Nico Blake (Persephone Swales-Dawson) and dies after his wedding to Grace Black (Tamara Wall).	Jorgie Porter
13 May 2020	22 May 2018	Sienna Blake (Anna Passey) vs Nico Blake (Persephone Swales-Dawson) vs Warren Fox (Jamie Lomas) on the rooftop.	Jorgie Porter
14 May 2020	30 October 2017	Mac Nightingale (David Easter) causes an explosion at Hollyoaks High School.	Kieron Richardson
15 May 2017	31 October 2017	Mac Nightingale (David Easter) kills Neeta Kaur (Amrit Maghera) at Hollyoaks High School.	Kieron Richardson
20 May 2020	27 December 2006	Clare Devine (Gemma Bissix) tries to kill Max Cunningham (Matt Littler).	Matt Littler
21 May 2020	27 December 2006	Clare Devine (Gemma Bissix) tries to kill Max Cunningham (Matt Littler).	Gemma Bissix
22 May 2020	19 September 2007	Clare Devine (Gemma Bissix) attempts revenge on Warren Fox (Jamie Lomas) and Justin Burton (Chris Fountain).	Jamie Lomas
27 May 2020	19 December 2012	Ste Hay (Kieron Richardson) follows Brendan Brady (Emmett J. Scanlan) to Dublin.	James Sutton
28 May 2020	20 December 2012	Ste Hay (Kieron Richardson) reconciles with Brendan Brady (Emmett J. Scanlan) in Dublin.	Anna Passey
29 May 2020	21 March 2013	Aftermath of Cheryl Brady (Bronagh Waugh) killing Seamus Brady (Fintan McKeown) and Brendan Brady (Emmett J. Scanlan) vs Armed Police.	Kieron Richardson
3 June 2020	31 October 2011	Silas Blissett (Jeff Rawle) decides that "Catwoman" Lynsey Nolan (Karen Hassan) would be his next murder victim but Lynsey attacks him.	Bronagh Waugh
4 June 2020	1 November 2011	Silas Blissett (Jeff Rawle) kills his daughter Heidi Costello (Kim Tiddy) by accident and holds Mercedes McQueen (Jennifer Metcalfe) hostage.	Jennifer Metcalfe
5 June 2020	2 November 2011	Silas Blissett (Jeff Rawle) is arrested and Mercedes McQueen (Jennifer Metcalfe) goes into labour.	Jennifer Metcalfe
10 June 2020	14 November 2012	Build up to Tony Hutchinson (Nick Pickard) and Cindy Cunningham's (Stephanie Waring) second wedding plus Doug Carter (PJ Brennan) and Ste Hay's (Kieron Richardson) civil partnership.	Kieron Richardson
11 June 2020	15 November 2012	Bus crashes into wedding venue after Leah Barnes (Elà-May Demircan) played on the road, Hollyoaks: Enjoy the Ride.	Elà-May Demircan
12 June 2020	16 November 2012	Bus explodes killing Neil Cooper (Tosin Cole) and caused Maddie Morrison (Scarlett Bowman) to die, Building caves in and kills Rhys Ashworth (Andy Moss).	Jazmine Franks
17 June 2020	16 May 2007	Craig Dean (Guy Burnet) and John Paul McQueen (James Sutton) sleep together.	James Sutton
18 June 2020	10 September 2007	Craig Dean (Guy Burnet) and Sarah Barnes' (Loui Batley) engagement becomes public.	Jessica Fox
19 June 2020	11 September 2007	Sarah Barnes (Loui Batley) catches Craig Dean (Guy Burnet) and John Paul McQueen (James Sutton) in bed together.	James Sutton
24 June 2020	18 December 1997	Cindy Cunningham (Stephanie Waring) hides her pregnancy from her family.	Sarah Jayne Dunn
25 June 2020	22 December 1997	On Christmas Day, Dawn Cunningham (Lisa Williamson) dies from leukaemia and Cindy Cunningham (Stephanie Waring) gives birth to her daughter Holly.	Stephanie Waring
26 June 2020	29 December 1997	Dawn Cunningham's (Lisa Williamson) funeral, Gordon Cunningham (Bernard Latham) and Angela Cunningham (Liz Stooke) discover their daughter Cindy Cunningham (Stephanie Waring) secretly gives birth to Holly Cunningham on Christmas Day.	Stephanie Waring
1 July 2020	26 June 2008	Myra McQueen (Nicole Barber-Lane) publicly reveals that her son John Paul McQueen (James Sutton) was sleeping with priest Kieron Hobbs (Jake Hendriks) whilst he was officiating Max Cunningham's (Matt Littler) wedding to Steph Dean (Carley Stenson).	James Sutton
2 July 2020	27 June 2008	Tom Cunningham (Ellis Hollins) plays on the road but a oncoming car is coming and Max Cunningham (Matt Littler) pushing him out of the way but Max gets hit by a car and dies on his wedding day to Steph Dean (Carley Stenson).	Ellis Hollins
3 July 2020	30 June 2008	The village discovers Max Cunningham (Matt Littler) has died.	Ellis Hollins
8 July 2020	11 May 2006	Tony Hutchinson (Nick Pickard) and Mandy Richardson (Sarah Jayne Dunn) find out their daughter Grace is unconscious.	Nick Pickard
9 July 2020	12 May 2006	Grace Hutchinson dies from SIDS.	Nick Pickard
10 July 2020	23 October 2013	Diane O'Connor (Alex Fletcher) and Tegan Lomax (Jessica Ellis) both give birth.	Alex Fletcher
15 July 2020	25 October 2000	Mark Gibbs (Colin Parry) and his accomplices are on trial for the rape of Luke Morgan (Gary Lucy).	Stephanie Waring
16 July 2020	26 October 2000	Mark Gibbs (Colin Parry) and his accomplices are on trial for the rape of Luke Morgan (Gary Lucy).	Stephanie Waring
17 July 2020	26 October 2000	Mark Gibbs (Colin Parry) and his accomplices are found guilty and sentenced for the rape of Luke Morgan (Gary Lucy).	Sarah Jayne Dunn
21 July 2020	5 September 2007	Hannah Ashworth (Emma Rigby) helps Melissa Hurst (Carla Chases) escapes hospital with anorexia but Melissa dies from anorexia.	Andy Moss
22 July 2020	6 September 2007	Hannah Ashworth's (Emma Rigby) battle with anorexia.	Jessica Fox
23 July 2020	21 September 2007	Hannah Ashworth's (Emma Rigby) anorexia relapse.	James Sutton
24 July 2020	25 September 2007	Hannah Ashworth (Emma Rigby) collapse aftermath.	Andy Moss
11 September 2020	30 November 2006		Ellis Hollins
18 September 2020	9 October 2003		Tamara Wall
25 September 2020	11 March 1996		Haiesha Mistry
2 October 2020	28 November 2003		Ashley Taylor Dawson
9 October 2020	11 August 1997		Bobby Gordon
16 October 2020	21 August 2000		Rishi Nair
23 October 2020	23 October 1995		Nick Pickard
30 October 2020	27 September 2006		David Tag
6 November 2020	8 February 2005		Sarah Jayne Dunn
13 November 2020	26 August 2009		Ijaz Rana
20 November 2020	8 July 1999		Chelsee Healey
27 November 2020	6 February 2007		James Sutton
4 December 2020	25 August 2005		Jessica Fox
11 November 2020	16 July 1998		Kieron Richardson
18 November 2020	26 December 2012		Jennifer Metcalfe
8 January 2021	26 June 2006		Richard Blackwood
15 January 2021	6 November 2013		Anna Passey
