= Anna Green (Hollyoaks) =

UK soap opera character, created 1999

- Hollyoaks character
- Portrayed by: Lisa M. Kay
- Duration: 1999–2002
- First appearance: 15 September 1999
- Last appearance: 10 December 2002
- Introduced by: Jo Hallows
In-universe information
- Occupation: Student
- Father: Reverend Green
- Mother: Liz Green
- Sons: Charlie Green

Anna Green is a fictional character from the British soap opera Hollyoaks, played by Lisa M. Kay. The character made her first on-screen appearance on 15 September 1999. Anna is introduced into the series as one of five new students arriving to study at the Hollyoaks Community College. Anna is characterised as "dowdy", "prim and proper" and unlucky in love. She is often seen wearing her trademark glasses, which Kay believed did not suit the character. Anna received a style transformation as writers evolved her character into a more confident personality. Writers developed a friendship between Geri Hudson (Joanna Taylor) which helped make Anna more empowered. Geri also helped Anna overcome her failed first romance with Sam Smallwood (Tim Downie). One of the character's first prominent stories was being run over in a hit-and-run incident. The perpetrators, Cindy Cunningham (Stephanie Waring) and Ben Davies (Marcus Patric), evade justice and allow Tony Hutchinson (Nick Pickard) to be accused of the crime. Anna later discovers Ben's involvement and forms an unlikely friendship with him. Writers paired Anna with fellow student character, Alex Bell (Martino Lazzeri), and the relationship went on to define the character's later stories.

They are portrayed as a tumultuous dynamic, often breaking up because of Alex's bad behaviour. Writers decided to portray a pregnancy storyline via Anna, but Alex abandons her and refuses to believe he is the father. Anna gives birth to a son, Charlie and the issue of adoption is explored. Anna initially neglects Charlie, causing him to fall ill but she later takes responsibility. Writers later united Anna and Alex, but his behaviour continues to cause problems, especially when he applies for a job in Hong Kong. Anna breaks up with him, and Alex tries to abduct Charlie but fails. Writers then paired Anna romantically with Max Cunningham (Matt Littler) during her final storylines. Kay made her final appearance as Anna during the episode broadcast on 10 December 2002.

Television critics have judged Anna for her relationships with men. Anne-Marie O'Connor from Wicklow People branded her a "straight-laced" character, and Penny Fray from the Daily Post believed that Anna had more character changes than the rest of the cast combined.

== Development ==
=== Creation and introduction ===
Anna is Kay's first television role after previously concentrating on theatre roles. Kay described the transition from stage to television as "fantastic" but "a shock". She added that she eventually settled into the role after a few months. She made her first on-screen appearance as Anna during the episode broadcast on 15 September 1999. One of Kay's first scenes required her to portray Anna as drunk and vomiting. The production team put vegetable soup in Kay's hair and over her clothing, which acted as Anna's vomit. Kay recalled that it was her first meeting with some cast members, and the scenario made her feel "like a real idiot". Anna was introduced into the series as one of five new students studying at Hollyoaks Community College. They consisted of Anna, Alex Bell (Martino Lazzeri), Geri Hudson (Joanna Taylor), Sam Smallwood (Tim Downie) and Nikki Sullivan (Wendy Glenn). They all make their first appearances during the episodes from the week commencing 12 September 1999. All the actors joined the cast at the same time. Lazzeri recalled it was not daunting for them because they were all in the same new situation. Anna begins studying to gain a degree in architecture. The group were involved in typical chaotic student storylines during their first months on-screen. Kay was involved in a location shoot for episodes set in Switzerland. In the story, Anna and her fellow students go on a skiing holiday and attend the wedding of Nikki and Dan Sanders (Joseph May).

Anna is featured in a relationship storyline with Sam. When Anna is ready to commit to their relationship, he has sex with his ex-girlfriend Nikki. Writers developed a friendship between Anna and Geri, soon becoming best friends and making Anna a more empowered character. Geri and her mother, Jacqui Hudson (Julie Peasgood), help Anna to take revenge against Sam following his infidelity. As a "woman scorned", Anna steals his trainers, sabotages his exam timetable, puts chilli powder in his underwear and dyes onto his soap. They also exclude him from their second-year student accommodation application.

=== Characterisation ===
Anna is characterised as a "dowdy 'Plain Jane' Vicar's daughter". Kay's mother, Sylvia, described Anna as a "very prim, proper and sensible girl". In November 1999, a reporter from Torquay Herald Express revealed the plans made by the Hollyoaks production team to transform Anna into a more sexy character. They added she "blossoms into a beauty who makes Hollyoaks men's hearts race." Anna's style and fashion sense have played into her characterisation. Her on-screen attire was controlled by Alex McGregor, head of the wardrobe department at Mersey Television. McGregor explained to Penny Fray from the Daily Post that Anna is originally from a small village. To reflect the character's background, McGregor dressed in old-fashioned Laura Ashley dresses. When Anna settles into city life and befriends the likes of Geri, McGregor "evolved her look" to suit. He began dressing her in Warehouse and New Look clothing. This was to give Anna the look of a "more confident and sexy woman". Kay revealed that she hated Anna's original "dowdy" dress sense and wanted her to look "a little less dated". She added, "Things have finally improved on the fashion front, but I still look nothing like Anna off-screen." In another interview, Kay assessed that "Anna usually gets to wear the sensible and sometimes a bit boring, flowery flowing dress."

One of Anna's most recognisable characteristics is her being portrayed wearing glasses. Kay believed that Anna's glasses did not suit the character, and she was often shown "feeling really low" in them. Off-screen, Kay was chosen to take part in a promotion for Specsavers, advertising more fashionable glasses. Kay added it was a good opportunity to show viewers Anna can "look stunning in specs".

Producers cast Bernard Holly and Hazel McBride to play Anna's parents, Reverend Green and Mrs Green, respectively. Their relationship dynamic is explored via Anna's pregnancy storyline. Anna's mother does not approve and worries that the unplanned pregnancy will affect her reputation. Her father reacts supportively and defends Anna to other characters.

=== Hit and run accident. ===
A significant storyline for Anna was created in 2000, when she was run over in a hit-and-run crime. The accident occurs when Cindy Cunningham (Stephanie Waring) goes on the run from the social services. She steals Tony Hutchinson's (Nick Pickard) car and Ben Davies (Marcus Patric) escorts her to an airport. Cindy is driving the car, with Ben in her passenger seat. To get away faster, they drive at high speeds, knock Anna over, but carry on driving regardless. The incident formed Waring's exit from the series as Cindy. Ben remained in the show, and writers explored the consequences solely through him and Anna. Patric told Sally Brockway from Soaplife that Ben knew they ran someone over and called an ambulance. Patric believed Ben is "wrestling with his conscience" and "felt bad" about not helping Anna. Ben returns to the scene of the accident to confront his guilt. Anna is taken to the hospital and later recovers from her injuries.

The writers made Tony the main suspect in the hit-and-run investigation. At the time, he was drunk and has no memory of what happened, leaving him unsure if he was involved or not. The police discover that Tony's car collided with Anna and he does not have an alibi. Anna, Geri and Alex blame Tony and move out of the flat they share with him. Pickard told All About Soap's Rachel Corcoran that their reaction makes Tony "feel guilty" and "very alone". Tony considers leaving because of Anna, but Ruth Osborne (Terri Dwyer) defends his innocence. She takes Tony to visit a hypnotist and unlocks his memory. His alibi is confirmed and Tony vows to find the real culprit.

Anna is forced to accept the culprit may never be found. Writers revisited the story in the July 2001 episodes. Anna is nearly run over by a car driven by Dan Hunter (Andrew McNair), with Ben as his passenger. The incident triggers Anna to remember that Ben had committed the original hit and run crime. Kay told an Inside Soap reporter that Anna believed she had overcome her ordeal. The incident leaves Anna "shocked and traumatised" and becomes "determined" to confront Ben. He denies being the culprit but later confesses he ran her over. Kay added that "Ben's terrified about her going to the police". Anna decides to forgive Ben, keep his secret and focus on her new pregnancy. Writers developed a friendship between Anna and Ben, which annoys his girlfriend Mandy Richardson (Sarah Jayne Dunn). Anna begins to use Ben as a confidant and continues to support her. Anna collapses in The Loft nightclub and is rushed to hospital with Ben for support. Anna is relieved that her unborn child has survived but it criticised by hospital staff for being irresponsible. Ben defends Anna's actions which further annoys Mandy.

=== Relationship with Alex Bell ===
Writers created a relationship storyline between Anna and Alex. Kay and Lazzeri also began a relationship off-screen. Lazzeri told Julia Kuttner from Daily Record that their relationship added to the realism of their character's romance. He added "when we kissed and cuddled each other we didn't feel embarrassed, we felt really relaxed."

Alex receives test results from a sperm donation which claim he is infertile. Lazzeri told Susan Riley from Soaplife that Alex discovering he is infertile is a "life-changing event" and a story about "masculinity". Writers decided to complicate Anna and Alex's potential relationship via the infertility plot. Alex presumes that Chloe Bruce (Mikyla Dodd) is discussing his infertility issues via her radio show and plots revenge against her. Alex takes Chloe on a date and has sex with her and humiliates her. Chloe responds by discussing the matter on her radio show, prompting Alex to call in to defend himself, unaware that the broadcast is live and Anna hears. Lazzeri revealed that Alex is "almost in love" with Anna but is "ruining everything between them". He added that Anna does not understand Alex's behaviour. Lazzeri added his certainty that Anna would forgive Alex.

During April 2001's episodes, Anna is portrayed more determined to pursue romance with Alex and tries to support him through a family crisis. Anna organises a toga party to cheer Alex up but her plans are ruined. Kay told Francesca Babb from All About Soap that Anna is secretly trying to win Alex over. His father arrives at the party and Alex begins behaving strangely. It transpires that Alex cannot deal with his father being gay and chooses to ignore Anna. The pair have an argument during the episode broadcast on 18 April 2001, which sees the start of their relationship. Anna confronts Alex, Kay assessed that the story showed Anna "has so much strength" and proved she is "determined" to help Alex despite his behaviour. Kay added that Anna knows Alex has a "good side" no matter "how nasty he acts". Alex gets drunk and to prove he is not gay like his father, tries to force himself sexually onto Anna. Kay branded the scene "completely out of order" and stressed that "Anna makes sure he knows it".

Alex is regretful about his behaviour and apologises to Anna. Kay explained that Alex had always been unapologetic towards Anna so know she knows he is serious and wants to begin a relationship. Alex is portrayed as a promiscuous womaniser but tells Anna he does not want to rush into sex with her. Kay added that this makes Anna certain he cares about her. Writers also used it to develop a new side to Anna's characterisation. Anna becomes more assertive and takes control in their relationship, and instigates their first sexual encounter. Kay believed "it brought out a whole new side to her". In May's episode, writers continued to use Alex's father as a recurring issue. Anna retrieves a letter from Alex's father from a bin and Alex accuses her of meddling. Kay told Babb that "Alex, once again, turns nasty on Anna." Kay concluded that Anna would continue to try and appease Alex. She believed they would "make a good couple eventually" but hoped for more drama, because the alternative would be "far too boring" to play. In an interview with Wendy Granditer (Inside Soap), Lazzeri revealed that "really happy" with the writer's decision to unite Anna and Alex and that viewers wanted them together. He added "they both deserve a bit of happiness after all the grief they've had in the past year."

Writers continued to develop a tumultuous relationship between Anna and Alex, with of bad behaviour towards Anna worsening. She discovers that she is pregnant and Alex breaks-up with her. Lazzeri revealed that viewers were overly invested in the relationship and some viewers approached him in public to criticise his behaviour towards Anna. Writers played Alex refusing to accept the baby as his own because he has been told he is infertile. He later lies to Anna about taking a second conclusive test but later tells the truth.

Producers decided to portray an issue based storyline via Anna's motherhood, exploring child neglect and adoption. Anna gives birth to a son, Charlie but is unable to cope and decides to put him up for adoption. Anna is shocked when Alex decides he wants to gain full custody of Charlie. Anna is forced to look after Charlie until she can change Alex's mind. Kay told a reporter from Inside Soap that "Anna just doesn't want the child. He cries a lot and she just can't get her college work done because she's really exhausted." Writers portrayed Anna as neglectful towards Charlie and he subsequently develops nappy rash. Kay added that Anna does not look after Charlie correctly. Anna allows Alex to look after Charlie to get some respite but is uncomfortable with him wanting to bond with their son. Kay described her character as "relieved to get the baby off her hands", but described Anna's disbelief Alex suddenly wants to be a "proper dad" after "all she's been through on her own". Kay found Anna's neglect and rejection of Charlie difficult to portray. She explained that in one scene, Anna "just loses it completely". Kay recalled feeling "awful" having to filming the scene as she was screaming into a baby's face.

Throughout Anna's appearances in 2002, writers refocused on rebuilding Anna and Alex's relationship. By July's episodes, the duo were depicted at odds again. Alex applies for a job in Hong Kong and expects Anna to quit her degree and move with him. A writer from the official Hollyoaks website revealed that Alex's decision would "trigger off rumblings that will reverberate across Hollyoaks for the next couple of weeks". An Inside Soap reporter revealed that Anna questions her feelings about Alex. She later gives him an ultimatum, to choose her or his new job. They added that Alex would "seek solace" from his ex-girlfriend Becca Hayton (Ali Bastian) once again. Lazzeri told David Hollingsworth (Soaplife) that Alex realises that he is getting close to Becca and "stops himself". Lazzeri believed it proved Alex's love for Anna and Charlie, noting that most men would not have cared and cheated.

=== Final stories and departure ===
Anna was portrayed keen to move on from Alex, entering a new relationship with Max Cunningham (Matt Littler). Writers had displayed a bond between the two characters in previous scenes. Anna seeks out Max for comfort over Alex's job offer. Anna and Max share a kiss which leaves her in a confused state. Kay told an Inside Soap interviewer that "Anna's always had a soft spot for Max" and realises the potential for a "serious" relationship between them. Kay believed that despite Anna's initial protests that it should not have happened, she wants to pursue the idea. She added "deep down she did enjoy it, and she hasn't felt this good in a long time." Kay concluded that Anna knows Alex wants their relationship to succeed, but ultimately he "just keeps on letting her down." Anna then breaks up with Alex and moves in with the Cunningham family. Alex attempts to change Anna's mind and begins pestering her. The writer noted that "there's nothing he won't do to win Anna back". Anna tells Alex she no longer loves him, Lazzeri added that Alex is "absolutely devastated" and ends up sleeping on the streets. Anna tries to prevent Alex from seeing Charlie. This time a reconciliation is not possible, "the damage really is irrevocable". Lazzeri likened his character to a zombie because "I think he knows it's finally over."

The show explored another topical storyline in September 2002. Alex tricks Anna into allowing him to look after Charlie. Alex then absconds to an airport with him and tries to take him to Hong Kong without her consent. Anna realises Alex's plan and rushes to the airport to stop him. Lazzeri informed Claire Brand from Inside Soap that Alex "is at the end of his tether" with Anna. He believed Alex does not consider how Anna will cope without her son. Alex also "a lot of jealousy" because of Anna and Max's relationship and the actor believed Alex's mental health was suffering. Alex is unable to deal with the idea of another man helping to look after Charlie and it "tips him over the edge". He added that Alex still loves Anna but he cares more about Charlie. He rationalises his behaviour by recalling Anna's behaviour towards Charlie when he was born and she "didn't really have any time for him". Becca rushes to the airport first, intent on moving to Hong Kong with Alex and Charlie. Lazzeri believed Alex would have definitely gone through with his plan had Anna not arrived at the airport to stop him. The airport drama formed Lazzeri's finale scenes in Alex's departure story from Hollyoaks, but Anna and Charlie remained in the series.

Kay left Hollyoaks in 2002, with Kay commenting that she "enjoyed every day" playing Anna because she had "some good, juicy storylines". In her final story, Anna is featured leaving the village with Charlie, to live in Buxton with her parents. She also ends her relationship with Max because he reveals that he does not love her. Kay told Zeena Moolla from Inside Soap that Anna knows Max does not want to commit to her relationship demands. He also spends more with O.B. (Darren Jeffries) than her, which prompts Anna to confront him about his feelings. Kay explained that Anna is "shocked at first" when Max tells Anna he does not love her. Anna then realises that it is "best all round if she were to leave". Kay added that living in the Cunningham's overcrowded house is also too much and Anna needs stability for both her and Charlie, which adds to her decision to leave. Anna chooses to return to her parents and would never reconcile with Alex. Kay concluded that the character would "sort her head out and take stock for a bit". Kay made her final appearance as Anna during the episode broadcast on 10 December 2002.

== Storylines ==
Anna arrives in Hollyoaks with her friends Sam, Geri, Nikki and Alex. She is immediately shocked to discover that her father has been having an affair and it has become front page news because he is a vicar. Sam comforts her over her father's affair and ends up kissing Anna, and the pair go on to date from there. However, Anna is surprised when Sam accidentally sends a text to Anna revealing that he has spent the night with Nikki. Anna breaks up with Sam, but is heartbroken when Sam and Nikki make a fresh start together away from Hollyoaks.

Anna is then knocked over by Cindy and Ben but makes a full recovery in the hospital. Alex is upset that he is infertile and tells Anna. She confides to Geri, who ends up spreading it around Hollyoaks. Alex is upset and takes his anger out on Anna and Alex soon realises how bad he has been to Anna. Anna accepts Alex's apology and the pair get back together. However, Anna is shocked when she discovers that she is pregnant, despite believing that Alex is infertile. When Anna tells Alex, Alex refuses to believe her and accuses Anna of being unfaithful. Anna forces Alex to do a second test, and when he does, the hospital admit to making a mistake and it is revealed that Alex is in fact fertile after all. Alex apologises to Anna, but tells her that he does not want the baby and offers her money to have an abortion. Anna is left confused and without much support, she decides in the end that she cannot go through with an abortion, so she decides that when the child is born she will give it up for adoption.

Anna gives birth to her child with support from Max and Alex, who realises that he want to keep the baby. Anna is persuaded by Alex to keep the baby, and Alex names him Charlie and they try to take steps towards life as a family. However, Anna tries to work on her relationship with Alex, but she feels that she cannot love him any longer and she has sex with Max. With a guilty conscience, Anna confesses to Alex, and she decides to move in with the Cunningham family with Charlie, despite Alex trying to persuade her to give their relationship another chance. Anna and Max both agree that they are serious about their relationship and Anna rejects Alex when he asks her to marry him. Anna then has a night out with Max, leaving Alex to babysit Charlie, but when the pair return to collect Charlie from Alex's flat, Anna realises that Alex is taking Charlie away with him to Hong Kong. Anna rushes to the airport, just in time to catch Alex, and she manages to persuade him to give Charlie back to her. With Alex leaving Hollyoaks for Hong Kong, Anna believes she can build up her relationship with Max by buying a flat together. However, Max shocks Anna when he reveals that he has had far too much responsibility and is not yet ready for commitment. Anna feels she has nothing left in Hollyoaks and decides to leave by going back to her mother's house.

== Reception ==
A writer from Torquay Herald Express branded Kay "the latest hot property in soapland" because of her role as Anna. Lorna Cooper of MSN TV listed Anna as one of soap opera's "forgotten characters". Reviewing the students early stories, a Soaplife critic assessed that "new students Nikki, Sam, Anna, Alex and Geri cause college chaos". They added "there's bed hopping, broken hearts and bare faced cheek as the students get up to their usual antics." A sickened Anne-Marie O'Connor from Enniscorthy Guardian wrote that Anna and Sam were "blissfully happy together", with her jesting "pass the sick bucket". Upon viewing Sam cheat on Anna with Nikki, O'Connor said it was "a pity" Sam was not "horrified" before having sex with Nikki, adding "MEN amaze me!". The critic believed the plot "makes things worse" by having Anna ready to commit to Sam. O'Connor, now writing for Wicklow People branded Sam the "rat of the week" for his treatment of Anna and warned her to "stay away" from him. She also scathed "this ratman has spent ages trying to coax the cami-knickers off straight-laced Anna". She added that Nikki has "looser morals" than Anna does. She concluded that Anna "has the last laugh" in her rivalry with Nikki.

Anna and Alex's relationship has been reviewed by various television critics. O'Connor (Wicklow People) assessed that "Anna has more than one baby to look after" via her relationship with the "infertile, 19-year-old boyfriend" Alex. Merle Brown from Daily Record disliked the relationship. She believed that Anna was better suited romantically to Max rather than Alex. She noted Anna finally "sees sense" in choosing Max, adding that it was "about time too". In another review, Brown could not fathom why Anna would even "want to go near" a "prat" like Alex. Her colleague, Julia Kuttner wrote that Anna was mistreated by Alex, adding "a good example" is "when he left her in the lurch when she discovered she was pregnant". Linda Higgins from The Herald assessed that the relationship left Anna in "turmoil". Higgins added her hopes that Anna and Alex would reach a "new understanding" after she accepted his help in parenting.

An Inside Soap critic was fed up with the Anna and Alex relationship story. They questioned whether they would ever make a decision about their romance and scathed "will we all be past caring by the time they finally do?" They added that Kay and Lazzeri must have been "sick of spouting the same lines week after week" and deserved a better storyline. The critic later praised Hollyoaks return to a good "standard" in August 2002 due to story changes. They praised Anna and Alex's break up, noting "at long last, Anna Green and Alex Bell have stopped sniping and split up".

Penny Fray from Daily Post wrote that "from vicar's daughter to single mum, Anna has seen more changes to her on-set style than most of Hollyoak's cast members put together." Fray added that she preferred Kay's dress sense over Anna's "dowdy dresses". A writer from Inside Soap branded the character a "young mum" and a "frump". A Soaplife columnist chose Alex attempting to prevent Anna putting their child up for adoption in their "hot plots" feature. They added their understanding of Anna's anger and confusion. Inside Soap's Zeena Moolla opined "being a practical sort of girl, Anna Green has coped remarkably well with the sort of dramas that would send most people her age over the edge." She added that Anna is a "steady" and "dependable" type of character.
