= Becca Hayton =

Fictional character from Hollyoaks

- Hollyoaks character
- Portrayed by: Ali Bastian
- Duration: 2001–2007
- First appearance: 12 September 2001
- Last appearance: 15 February 2007
- Created by: Kaddy Benyon
- Introduced by: Jo Hallows
- Book appearances: Hollyoaks: Playing With Fire
In-universe information
- Occupation: Teacher
- Father: Charles Hayton
- Mother: Margaret Hayton
- Sisters: Nancy Hayton
- Husband: Jake Dean (2005–2007)
- Sons: Charlie Dean
- Nephews: Oscar Osborne

Becca Dean (also Hayton) is a fictional character from the Channel 4 soap opera Hollyoaks, played by Ali Bastian. She first appeared on-screen on 12 September 2001 and departed on 15 February 2007.

== Development ==
In 2002, producers decided to create an issue based storyline for Becca involving the sexually transmitted disease, gonorrhoea. The storyline was a direct response to calls from the British Medical Association wanting soap operas to help raise awareness of sexually transmitted diseases. They also wanted to promote safer sex for the show's viewers. A Hollyoaks publicist told Allison Maund from Inside Soap that "we developed this storyline a while ago, with sexually transmitted diseases on the rise, this story is even more relevant."

== Storylines ==
Becca arrived as an undergraduate in 2001. She was a naïve fresher who forged a relationship with fellow student Jamie Nash (Stefan Booth). The pair started dating, but he was a love rat who two-timed her with her best friend. When Becca found out about his infidelity, she dumped him but despite this; Becca always saw a different side to Jamie and shortly they got back together, but it didn't last. He was killed in the minibus accident on a potholing trip, which also killed Theo Sankofa (Andrew Somerville). Around the same time, Becca discovered she was pregnant with Jamie's baby. Feeling she was not ready to be a parent, Becca had an abortion against the advice of Jamie's sister, Jodie.

She later embarked on a relationship with Alex Bell (Martino Lazzeri) but things were complicated. Alex had a strained relationship with Anna Green (Lisa M. Kay), the mother of his son, Charlie. Alex used Becca to make Anna jealous which worked as Anna blamed Becca for the tension between herself and Alex. Sadly, for Becca this relationship ended when Alex decided to take a job in Hong Kong. Her next relationship was with Adam Morgan, who was recovering from the car accident caused by Mandy Richardson (Sarah Jayne Dunn) that landed him in a wheelchair. Becca provided unlimited support through Adam's time of need. Becca was distraught when Adam accepted a place at a film school in New York. She begged him to stay, but her pleas were all in vain, as Adam went anyway. At one point, Becca even enjoyed a brief liaison with local firefighter Ben Davies (Marcus Patric), the best friend of her future husband Jake Dean (Kevin Sacre).

Becca and Jake have experienced tension in their relationship; most recently, after Jake found out she had been visiting ex-student Justin Burton (Chris Fountain), who had an unrequited crush on her, in prison and most notably when Jake had an affair with Lisa Hunter (Gemma Atkinson) that resulted in him passing on an STD. Although the affair ended when Jake realised he was madly in love with Becca, the guilt proved too much and his first marriage proposal became a confession. The two broke up but Jake was determined to win Becca back and did so with a knight in shining armour style proposal in the village. The two married although Becca still feared she was making a mistake up until she said 'I do'.

The marriage suffered problems almost immediately, as Becca feared she had made a mistake and Jake's possessive behaviour increased when she visited her pupil Justin in prison after being pressurized by his sisters. Jake also had money troubles following his parents’ disastrous mortgage, felt he had let Becca down, while Becca felt her marriage was a mistake, and felt trapped and alone. Becca made a best friend in Louise Summers (Roxanne McKee). On Christmas Eve 2005 she went to Justin's house and admitted she was jealous when she thought she found out he had slept with Nicole Owen (Ciara Janson) and this led to a passionate kiss. The next day she went back after spending most of Christmas Day playing happy families with the Deans. They slept together and she later told him it was a mistake even though it was obvious she still had feelings for him.

Becca told Jake that it would be a good idea for them to start a family together, which she would later regret as having children with Jake became the last thing on her mind. She told Mandy she had an affair with a teenager, Mandy later found out the identity of her teenage lover. When Justin told her he was leaving, she begged him to stay. She later claimed this was from an academic viewpoint only. The affair with Justin started up again on Valentine's Day, leading her to be torn between two men who both loved her desperately but in different ways. The shock news of her beloved father's death left her feeling more confused and distraught than ever. Nancy Hayton (Jessica Fox) was very angry with Becca because she went to see Mr. Hayton before he died, when in fact, Becca had intended to go to see Mr. Hayton so that she could spend a weekend with Justin, which she later regretted. Becca fell pregnant and did not know who the father was. Viewers witnessed Jake's violent streak, having raised a fist to Becca (and attacking Justin) after learning of her affair. Becca then slept with Justin again, then later attempted suicide before admitting her love for him. She decided to keep the child and raise it with Justin, who moved in with her - a decision that angered Nancy when she was not consulted first.

She lost her job as a teacher after the school became aware of her relationship with Justin, and for a short while she and Justin struggled financially living off his child benefit and wages from his job at Il Gnosh. They were briefly engaged (Justin having proposed with a ring bought with Becca's credit card) until Becca finally got tired of his immaturity and ended their relationship, kicking him out of the flat. Enraged by Becca dumping him, Justin went to the police and made false statements accusing Becca of child grooming, being a sexual predator and statutory child rape. He claimed that Becca had pursued him for months and forced him to have sex with her when he was only fifteen years old. If found guilty, Becca could have received 14 years penal servitude and consequently could have been forced to have her child put up for adoption.

However, she received a custodial sentence of two years. She went into labour as the verdict was announced and gave birth to a boy named Charlie Dean (Joshua McConville). When Jake came to see Becca in prison, they agreed that Jake would care for Charlie until she was released from prison. However, at the end of the visiting session, she could not part with her newborn son and took Charlie with her to grow up in prison. As she walked off after abusing their agreement, Jake was left distraught and furious that the baby that he believed to be his son had been taken away from him. He didn't want his supposed son to be brought up in prison or put up for adoption. He thought it would be best for Becca to let Jake look after him. Even though Becca didn't want to be parted from her son, she knew that prison is no place for a baby to grow up. She decided to give the baby to Jake. On Jake's next visit to prison, Becca was angry with Jake for letting her child be kidnapped. Eventually Becca and Jake agree they want to be a family again, when Becca comes out of prison. In prison, Becca made friends with Jacqui McQueen (Claire Cooper). When Jacqui was released, she went after Justin and convinced him to drop the charges.

During a drunken night at the Loft, Justin admitted to Warren Fox (Jamie Lomas) how Becca had been falsely imprisoned, based on his evidence. A disgusted Warren ordered Justin to inform the police. Justin then went to visit Becca in prison and made a promise to tell the truth in an effort to secure her release. Whilst awaiting the decision about her release, Becca got into a fight with her cellmate, Fran, who stabbed Becca in the stomach after a scuffle. She was rushed to hospital with Jake and Nancy by her side. Before she died, Becca made Nancy promise she would sit her A-Levels and Jake told Becca he loved and forgave her, as she told him that she loved him more than Justin. Becca died of internal bleeding on February 14, 2007, her time of death being recorded as 11:45am. Justin was held responsible for Becca's death by many of Hollyoaks' residents. It is mentioned later that Fran has begun serving a life sentence for Becca's murder.

In June 2009, Justin says goodbye to Becca and his sisters at the graveyard, before leaving Hollyoaks. In July 2018, a student of Nancy's, Brooke Hathaway (Tylan Grant), reveals to her that her mother is Fran. She explains that Fran is dying and wants to apologise to Nancy for Becca's murder. When Brooke and Nancy visit her, Fran explains how Brooke is autistic and how she is remorseful for killing Becca. Nancy tells Fran that Becca would want her to forgive her so she does. Fran, happy at being forgiven, passes away immediately afterwards.

== Reception ==
For the soap's portrayal of Becca and Jake's relationship, they were nominated for "Best Couple" at the 2004 Inside Soap Awards. Virgin Media profiled some of Hollyoaks's "hottest females" in their opinion, of Becca they stated: "Becca was every schoolboy's dream, especially when she had actual shenanigans with one of her students, Justin. Unfortunately, we won't be seeing any more of this mega babe as she suffered an untimely demise in prison." A writer for Women Republic said that Becca was one of Hollyoaks' top five characters. Profiling Becca's various relationships, Virgin Media noted how she "gained sympathy when Jake did the dirty on her"; they also branded her affair with Justin as "impetuous and selfish", observing how it "lost her several mates, her career and pretty much everything else." An Inside Soap reporter included Becca in a list of "top five Hollyoaks blonde" characters, calling Becca "dippy, drippy, but drool-worthy - she drives her hormonal students wild!"
