= Luke Morgan =

Fictional character from Hollyoaks

- Hollyoaks character
- Portrayed by: Gary Lucy
- Duration: 1999–2002; 2017–2023
- First appearance: 25 March 1999
- Last appearance: 19 July 2023
- Introduced by: Jo Hallows (1999, 2002); Bryan Kirkwood (2017); Lucy Allan (2023)
- Spin-off appearances: Hollyoaks: Breaking Boundaries (2000); Hollyoaks: Indecent Behaviour (2001); Hollyoaks: Ollie's Diaries (2022)
In-universe information
- Occupation: Footballer; Personal trainer Restaurant owner Chef
- Father: Andy Morgan
- Mother: Sue Morgan
- Brothers: Adam Morgan
- Sisters: Beth Morgan; Zara Morgan
- Wife: Scarlett Morgan (2004–2018); Mandy Richardson (2018–2019)
- Sons: Oliver Morgan; DJ
- Stepdaughters: Ella Richardson
- Grandsons: Thierry
- Aunts: Lydia Smith

Luke Morgan is a fictional character from the British Channel 4 soap opera Hollyoaks, played by Gary Lucy. He was introduced by the show's creator Phil Redmond as part of the Morgan family, and made his first appearance on 25 March 1999. The character was involved in a male rape storyline, which was branded "groundbreaking" and met with controversy. Lucy opted to leave the role in 2001 after two years, although he returned for two episodes in August 2002. The character's reintroduction was announced on 21 May 2017 and he returned on 24 July. Lucy took a break from the series in 2018 to appear in a play. The character made a few brief appearances throughout 2019 before he returned permanently in August. Luke was killed off in 2022, with his final scenes airing on 9 June 2022. He returned briefly in 2023 as a vision to his former fiancée Cindy Cunningham (Stephanie Waring).

== Development ==
=== Characterisation ===
Warm, good-looking, charismatic and bursting with energy, Luke Morgan is the very definition of a "glass half-full". To everybody around him, Luke's the happiest guy in the village, buzzing with positivity and always with big plans for the future. Ex-footballer Luke's got an endearing enthusiasm, which makes you want to believe in him as much as he believes in himself. Everybody knows that Luke is terrific on a night out, but few realise how hard it is for him to keep control...

— An excerpt from Luke's profile on the official Hollyoaks website.

The Mirror described him as "sullen face but loveable". Luke has been described as a "heart-throb" and a "hunk" by the Daily Record.

=== Male rape ===
Luke was bullied by Mark Gibbs and his friends for a while due to a football team rivalry. When Luke finally stood up to him Mark was incensed and he and his friends beat Luke up badly. When Luke tried to fight back, Mark raped Luke to belittle and devastate him. Hollyoaks creator Phil Redmond defended criticism and said the storyline "aimed to tackle one of the last great social taboos responsibly". In the lead up to the attack producers worked closely with rape-related support groups to help make the storyline as realistic as possible. On the storyline Lucy said "When they first told me about the storyline I was dubious as to whether or not I should take it. Firstly because I was so young and secondly it hadn't been touched before so no-one knew how the public and press would take it. After thinking about it and doing research behind it I thought it was definitely a subject worth approaching. So we did it and reaped the rewards. I feel very lucky." On why she wanted to tackle the subject series producer Jo Hallows said "The message is about banishing taboos – telling people it's OK to talk and there are people who can help. If this episode helps one person it will have been a worthwhile exercise." Keith Greenaway, coordinator of Central Birmingham Victim Support welcomed the decision saying "we can show victims it is not something to be ashamed of and it wasn't their fault".

Hallows directed the episode and later recalled the episode meant a lot to her. Hallows told Wendy Granditer from Inside Soap that production originally worried that Lucy would not be able to cope with tackling such a difficult storyline. She reasoned that Lucy had not previously been given such a "heavy" story. Hallows admitted she was wrong because Lucy "did fantastically well" and noted his success at the British Soap Awards. Following the end of the storyline, Luke began to struggle with depression, which led to the character attempting suicide.

=== Reintroduction and break ===
On 21 May 2017, it was reported that Lucy had agreed to reprise the role after an absence of fifteen years and had signed an eighteen-month contract. A show spokesperson confirmed the news to Digital Spy but refused to comment any further. Sarah James (Digital Spy) praised the news and said she was looking forward to his return.

"Luke is definitely not the same person and it is definitely not for the better. Hopefully it'll be make for good viewing though."

— Gary Lucy on how Luke acts upon his return. (2017)

Sarah Jayne Dunn was announced to be returning to the serial as Mandy Richardson on 2 June 2017, with speculation that the two returns could be connected. Further details surrounding Luke's reintroduction were also announced, with his return scenes scheduled for July 2017. Lucy expressed his joy at reprising the role, commenting that it "feels like being home". He added that he is enjoying his storylines and filming with Ashley Taylor Dawson, who appeared alongside Morgan in his original stint as Darren Osborne. On the character, Lucy said, "There are a lot of things he's struggling with. All is not as it seems. He's holding it together but as time goes on, he will start to struggle."

Executive producer Bryan Kirkwood suggested some storylines to Lucy, which persuaded him to accept the return. The actor also cited Kirkwood's enthusiasm and the ability to film with Dunn, Dawson and Nick Pickard (who portrays Tony Hutchinson) as other reasons for his return.

In July 2017, Lucy told Daniel Kilkelly of entertainment website Digital Spy that he would be performing in The Full Monty from September 2018. He stated that he was unaware how show bosses would fit his break into the character's storyline. It was announced on 15 March 2018 that Lucy would take a nine-month break from Hollyoaks to star in the tour. Luke will leave at the conclusion of his storyline in mid-2018. Luke departs in September 2018 after Mandy and Darren's affair is exposed and Luke was imprisoned for committing GBH. Kirkwood confirmed that Lucy would appear "intermittently" following his exit. He told Digital Spy that Luke would appear again as part of Mandy and Darren's affair storyline as well as part of his son Oliver Morgan's (Aedan Duckworth) storylines. Initially Kirkwood could not confirm whether Lucy would return permanently, however, in March 2019, it was confirmed that Lucy would be returning to the role full-time.

== Storylines ==
=== 1999–2002 ===
Luke arrives with his parents Andy Morgan (Ross Davidson) and Sue Morgan (Eve White), brother Adam Morgan (David Brown), and sisters Beth Morgan (Elizabeth O'Grady, Kate Baines) and Zara Morgan (Kelly Greenwood). He begins a friendship with Darren Osborne (Ashley Taylor Dawson) and a relationship with Mandy Richardson (Sarah Jayne Dunn). During a game of football, Luke tackles Mark Gibbs (Colin Parry) which ends Mark's chances of becoming a professional footballer and leads to Mark resenting Luke and bullying him. When Luke stands up to Mark, he becomes annoyed. One night Mark and two of his friends beats him up, before raping him. Luke remains silent about the rape, afraid of the consequences and his relationship with Mandy deteriorates as a result. They separate and she begins a relationship with Darren, aware it will upset Luke. When he tries to tell Mandy about the rape, she ignores him and tries to punish him for their separation.

A promotional image of Luke as he appeared in his first stint.

Luke becomes depressed and attempts suicide so Adam encourages him to talk to someone and Luke tells his family that he was raped. Sue, Adam and Mandy are supportive, whereas Andy struggles to believe his son. Darren is spiteful towards Luke and believes Luke is gay and lying about the rape. Annoyed at Darren's behaviour, Mandy ends their relationship and supports Luke. Sue begins to struggle with the pressure of the rape and begins taking medication. After Mark intimidates him, Luke decides to inform the police he was raped and Mark, along with his two friends, are charged with assault and rape. Believing the family will be disowned by the community, Andy asks Luke to drop the charges and later, Mark harasses Luke and tells him that he won't be believed. At the trial, Mark and his friends are found guilty and Mark is sentenced to eight years imprisonment, whereas the friends are sentenced to three years imprisonment.

Luke and Andy's relationship becomes estranged and he sells the story of his rape to the press to humiliate Andy. Eventually, they reunite but Luke struggles with Andy and Sue's inability to discuss the rape so decides to move out. Luke later expresses an interest in reconciling with Mandy but she decides not to as he is still overcoming the rape and secretly dates Ben Davies (Marcus Patric), Luke's close friend. Luke discovers their affair and briefly disowns them. Hoping to move on, Luke begins a relationship with Laura Burns (Lesley Crawford), who is mentally unstable. He begins to believe Laura is using him and is pleased when they separate, although Laura begins to secretly obsess over Mandy.

At a party, Scott Anderson (Daniel Hyde) teases Luke over the rape and with his friends, he chases Luke and pretends to rape him. Luke is traumatised by the attack and breaks down with Adam, admitting that he will not be able to move past the rape. He later tells Adam that he plans on leaving the village to escape his past. Luke is offered a job in Canada as a school football coach, which he accepts. As he prepares to leave, Beth admits that Scott raped her at the party, devastating Luke as he blames himself. After deciding to stay in the village to support Beth, she insists he leave to rebuild his life, which he eventually decides to do. Luke leaves and after he settles in Canada, Beth informs their family of her rape. Luke later returns to the village for his parents' second wedding. Despite being in a relationship with Adam, Mandy has a fling with Luke after realising they have feelings for each other. Luke offers Mandy the chance to return to Canada with him, but she declines and he returns alone.

=== 2017–2022 ===
Fifteen years later, Darren spots Luke in a bar near Hollyoaks village and they have lunch together; when Darren disappears momentarily, Luke steals money from his wallet and absconds. Darren tracks Luke down and discovers he is unemployed so offers him a job at his taxi firm, Daz Cabs. A drunk Luke later returns home to his partner, who is revealed to be Mandy; she warns him to stop drinking. When Darren discovers Luke drinking alcohol whilst working, he sacks him; they discuss Luke's situation and Luke denies being an alcoholic. Darren invites Luke to an AA meeting but he does not arrive as planned. Luke leaves Mandy's daughter, Ella Richardson (Erin Palmer), by herself when he goes to buy alcohol and the neighbours call social services. Tony Hutchinson (Nick Pickard) and Mandy return to the house and find social services waiting for them. They take Ella in to care and when Luke returns drunk again, Mandy leaves him.

Five weeks later, Luke returns to the village to see Mandy and he is not drunk. He tries to win her around but she rejects him so he walks away. However he meets Tony's wife, Diane (Alex Fletcher), for the first time and she reveals Tony kissed Mandy so Luke heads over to Tony's restaurant and has a fight with him. When Darren is released from prison, he discovers Luke is homeless and living out of his car. After Luke emotionally reveals to Darren that he has a drinking problem, Darren moves him in with the Osbornes. After setting into life with the Osbornes, Luke gets a trial at Hollyoaks High as a PE teacher. However, two of his students fight, which causes Luke to have flashbacks to when he was raped by Mark. Just as Luke is about to drink for the first time in over a month, Mac Nightingale (David Easter) causes an explosion in the school building, leaving Darren and Luke trapped and killing Neeta Kaur (Amrit Maghera). As Darren and Luke climb through an air vent, Luke reveals to Darren that he has a secret son and wife. They become trapped when debris blocks the air vents but it eventually gives way, freeing them.

The following month, Mandy decides to give Luke a second chance and they go on a date in Chester. Luke flees after seeing Mark. He then becomes obsessed with Mark, stalking him on social media and trying to arrange a meeting with him to buy his car whilst posing as Nancy Osborne (Jessica Fox). Luke is furious that Mark has a seemingly charmed life, with a wife and two children. He becomes a personal trainer and takes Mark's wife, Jenna (Laura Hopper), as a client. She tells Luke that Mark served eight years for a trumped up GBH charge. Fuming, Luke finds out where they live and trashes their house, buy drops Nancy's credit card in their home. After seeing Luke at the police station with Nancy, Mark confronts him at the Osborne house. Mark continues to behave as cockily as he did 17 years ago and shows no remorse for what happened. Mark goes to meet Jenna but finds Luke has followed him. Mark's demeanour has changed, saying his prison sentence was hell because of what he had done. Luke breaks down and reveals the agony of his life because of the rape, and asks Mark just to acknowledge what he did and apologise. Mark begs Luke not to tell Jenna and that he is not to blame for what has gone wrong in his life. Just then, Jenna overhears and asks what he meant, and Luke reveals what Mark had done to him. Jenna believes him due to Mark's silence and storms off, disgusted. Mark tells Luke it was one night and should have been left in the past. Luke responds that it is all his fault.

Mandy and Luke reconcile after she can see how hard he's trying to redeem himself, and in the process Mandy proposes. Luke agrees, even though he is already married to Scarlett Morgan (Susie Amy). Luke seeks help from lawyer Sami Maalik (Rishi Nair) to get a divorce from Scarlett, but they are unable to track her down. Luke damages Mandy's dress in a bid to delay the wedding, but she finds another dress. On the day of the wedding, Scarlett arrives in the village and confronts Luke, demanding that he give her money. He offers her £500 and a promise to find more money so Scarlett leaves. Luke and Mandy marry, but Luke's son, Oliver Morgan (Aedan Duckworth), crashes the wedding reception and reveals that Luke is his father and that he is still married to Scarlett. Luke bonds with Oliver over their shared interest in football. Later, Luke calls Mandy to apologise, unaware that she is sleeping with Darren. Luke's alcoholism continues to get worse, leading to the deterioration of his relationship with Mandy and causing him to ignore Ollie's attempts to talk to him about the grooming that he is experiencing at the hands of Buster Smith (Nathan Sussex). Luke also almost kills Simone Loveday (Jacqueline Boatswain) while drink driving and she encourages him to seek help after sharing her own experiences with alcohol. However, he is later arrested after being caught drink driving again. In early September 2018, Luke is finally sober and discovers explicit photos of Ollie in the bin. Believing that he has a girlfriend and that she took them, Luke discovers that Oliver has been sexually abused by Buster, but Oliver accidentally tells Luke that his abuser is Scott Drinkwell (Ross Adams). Luke attacks Scott and he is hospitalized. Mercedes McQueen (Jennifer Metcalfe) calls the police off-screen and Luke is arrested and imprisoned for GBH. Luke stands at Buster's trial and testifies against Buster, where is found guilty and sentenced to six years imprisonment.

Luke is released later in the year and has a brief fling with Lisa Loveday (Rachel Adedeji) to make Cindy Cunningham (Stephanie Waring) jealous. Luke acts as support when Diane is under the influence that Tony has left her, but he was stabbed and kidnapped by Breda McQueen (Moya Brady). Luke and Cindy start dating and agree to set up a Grand Bazzar in the village. In October, Luke starts drinking again, believing that Cindy and Ollie are ashamed of him. The construction work for the Bazzar comes to a halt after Breda crashes her car into the crane, with Tony in the boot, but nobody notices him. The crane malfunctions and crashes after Luke tampers with the controls whilst drunk. He briefly sees Tony before Breda kidnaps him again.

Cindy faces large fines from the council and demands that Luke pays them. Luke puts his differences aside with Cindy and proposes, which she accepts. On New Year's Eve, Ollie witnesses Sid Sumner (Billy Price) buying ketamine and Luke manages to stop him from taking it.

After displaying several health conditions, Luke refers himself to a doctor, where he is formally diagnosed with frontotemporal dementia. Devastated at the diagnosis, he determines to ensure that he gets aspects of his life right. He is able to get Ollie clean from his ketamine addiction, and settles his differences with his mother, Sue before her death. Zara returns to the village after many years, and upon learning of Luke's diagnosis, she moves in with him and Cindy to ensure Luke has additional support.

Over the next few months, Luke's condition begins to deteriorate, with him making reckless conditions, such as spending fundraiser money raised for a dementia-based charity on a holiday for him and Cindy, resulting in them being ostracised by the village and facing a charge of fraud, which is later dropped. Luke and Cindy later have a combined stag do and hen night in Majorca. During this holiday, Luke, Ollie, Darren and Tony are robbed, with Cindy's engagement ring being taken. Desperate to get it back, Luke finds where the robbers are, and upon realising they are not armed, he is able to coerce them into giving Cindy's engagement ring back. During a meal at the mountainside, Luke wanders around the area, beaming that he and Cindy are finally going to get a happily ever after, but due to his dementia clouding his mind, he is unable to realise he is standing too close to the cliff's edge. As Cindy warns him he is too close to the edge, Luke loses his balance and falls off the cliff and into the ocean. Luke is hospitalised and is in a coma; where Cindy keeps a vigil by his bedside. Luke is rushed into surgery after suffering from a collapsed lung, but he has sustained too much damage that the surgery failed, and therefore will eventually die from his injuries. Cindy, Ollie, Zara and Tony say their final goodbyes to Luke on his bedside. Luke then dies with Cindy by his side.

In 2023 Cindy suffers a bipolar episode after stopping taking her medication and has visions of Luke.

== Reception ==
For his portrayal of Luke, Lucy was awarded "Best Newcomer" at the 2000 British Soap Awards. This award is the first award won by the soap at the British Soap Awards. The trial was nominated for "Most Dramatic Storyline" at the 2001 Inside Soap Awards. A BBC columnist included Luke's rape storyline in their article about controversial issues portrayed through soap opera. Daily Record praised the storyline saying Lucy's was "great at portraying Luke's harrowing ordeal". The story even attracted the attention of Coronation Street actress Julie Goodyear, best known for portraying Bet Lynch, who opined that it "was portrayed with the right amount of sensitivity".

An All About Soap writer included Luke's male rape plot in their list of "top ten taboos" storyline list. They assessed that it was one of the "taboos which have bravely been broken by soaps." A writer from MSN described his rape storyline as "groundbreaking" material. But the storyline received criticism from Watchdog and some churches. A reporter from Virgin Media branded it "devastating and frightening" and placed it on their "soap's scariest storylines" list. Gareth McLean of the Radio Times listed the male rape plot amongst "the top five soap scandals – ever" and added that "with fewer than one in ten male rapes reported, the storyline was praised for raising awareness, but also criticised for doing so in a soap aimed at teenagers". In addition a BBC reporter noted that Lucy's portrayal garnered praise from a performance which "showed him retreating from the situation and eventually attempting suicide" and adjusting to life after the trial. Elizabeth Joyce of the Shropshire Star said that Luke was a "genuinely memorable" and "decent character", who still holds "a place in the heart of many a late-twentysomething".

An Inside Soap columnist included Luke's rape in a feature, highlighting memorable moments in 2000. They noted the story accumulated criticism from viewers who found the scenes "too upsetting".
