= Mercy (2009 film) =

- Directed by: Patrick Hoelck
- Written by: Scott Caan
- Produced by: Scott Caan
- Starring: Scott Caan
- Cinematography: Phil Parmet
- Music by: Mader
- Release date: June 2009 (Cinevegas Film Festival)
- Country: United States
- Language: English

Mercy is a 2009 American independent romantic drama film directed by Patrick Hoelck and written by Scott Caan, who also serves as lead actor and producer.

== Plot ==
A meandering and not too bright quasi celebrity is conflicted by his aimless and wannabe high living lifestyle.

== Cast ==
- Scott Caan as Johnny Ryan
- Wendy Glenn as Mercy Bennett
- Troy Garity as Dane Harrington
- Alexie Gilmore as Chris
- Erika Christensen as Robin
- Dylan McDermott as Jake
- James Caan as Gerry Ryan
- Whitney Able as Heather
- John Boyd as Erik
