= List of Hollyoaks characters introduced in 1999 =

The following is a list of characters who first appeared in the Channel 4 soap opera Hollyoaks in 1999, by order of first appearance. Throughout the year Hollyoaks saw several new arrivals including the Morgan family.

== Adam Morgan ==
Adam Morgan
- Hollyoaks character
- Portrayed by: David Brown
- Duration: 1999–2003
- First appearance: 15 February 1999
- Last appearance: 13 June 2003
- Introduced by: Jo Hallows
In-universe information
- Occupation: Lifeguard
- Father: Andy Morgan
- Mother: Sue Morgan
- Brothers: Luke Morgan
- Sisters: Beth Morgan; Zara Morgan
- Nephews: Oliver Morgan

Adam Morgan, played by David Brown, made his first on screen appearance in February 1999. Adam is introduced as part of the Morgan family, consisting of parents Andy Morgan (Ross Davidson) and Sue Morgan (Eve White) and children Adam, Luke Morgan (Gary Lucy), Beth Morgan (Elizabeth O'Grady) and Zara Morgan (Kelly Greenwood).

Adam is introduced as the enigmatic new lifeguard at the local college swimming pool. Adam has a fling with Jasmine Bates (Elly Fairman), before beginning a relationship with Kerri, his Australian girlfriend. Kerri asks Adam to move to Australia with her, but he decides to stay in the village and finish his degree. Adam then dates fresher Geri Hudson (Joanna Taylor), before starting a relationship with Izzy Cornwell (Elize du Toit) after saving her drowning. They split when she discovers that he has cameras set up in Tony Hutchinson's (Nick Pickard) house for a college project, although Adam tries to reconcile with Izzy. Adam's friend, Jamie Nash (Stefan Booth), arrives and stays with the Morgans. At New Year's, the family are shocked to discover Jamie and Mandy Richardson (Sarah Jayne Dunn) having sex on their sofa. Sue ejects Jamie from the house.

Adam grows frustrated with Mandy's treatment of the family and confronts her. They get in Mandy's car and Mandy drives quickly; they argue and Mandy tries to get Adam to leave the car. Mandy loses control of the car and they drive off a hill, landing on a railway. Mandy survives the crash with minor injuries, but while Adam survives, he is told that he may be paralysed. Adam starts to use a wheelchair. Beth confides in Adam that she has been raped by Scott Anderson (Daniel Hyde). Adam supports Beth through their trial and is annoyed when Scott is acquitted. Adam becomes moody, arrogant, and frustrated due to his paralysis. He visits Luke in Canada and when he returns, he has movement in his legs.

After reconciling with Mandy, they begin a secret relationship. Luke, who had a relationship with Mandy, returns for Andy and Sue's wedding. Mandy realises that she still has feelings for Luke and they have sex. Luke discovers that Mandy and Adam are in a relationship and Adam realises that Mandy and Luke had sex; they both dump Mandy. Luke returns to Canada and Andy enters the final year of his degree. Jamie dies and Adam comforts his girlfriend, Becca Hayton (Ali Bastian). They kiss and Becca agrees to start a relationship on the condition that it is slow. They eventually move in together. Adam completes his degree, starts to take his first steps following the accident, and is offered a job in New York. Adam wants to move, although Becca wants to stay in Hollyoaks village; he eventually decides to move to New York to pursue his dream of becoming a director.

== Joe Johnson ==
Joe Johnson
- Hollyoaks character
- Portrayed by: James McKenzie Robinson
- First appearance: 22 February 1999
- Last appearance: 15 November 1999
- Introduced by: Jo Hallows
In-universe information
- Mother: Jill Patrick
- Sisters: Kate Patrick

Joe Johnson, played by James McKenzie Robinson, appeared throughout 1999 before leaving. He was the son of Jill Patrick and long lost twin brother of Kate Patrick, who he had never known. When Joe arrived in the village, Kate rejected him, but soon warmed up to him. Unfortunately, there was an attraction between them which they could not shake and they shared a kiss. Ruth and her friend Carol Groves spread rumours that they were having an incestuous affair. Kate exacted revenge by stealing Carol's diary and photocopying pages and sticking them in the phone box for everyone to see. She then gave Ruth laxatives before her housewarming party, then hid all the toilet paper, and let all her friends and family in and left them to it. Joe's feelings for Kate grew stronger by the day, and realising that she couldn't cope with being so close to him any more, Kate said a tearful goodbye to Jill, Gina, Sol and Jack before breaking the news to Joe that she was leaving. Joe later left.

Kate and Jill attended Joe's wedding in May 2000.

== Luke Morgan ==
Lucas "Luke" Morgan is a fictional character from long-running Channel 4 soap opera Hollyoaks, played by Gary Lucy.

== Jacqui Hudson ==
Jacqui Hudson is a fictional character from the long-running Channel 4 soap opera Hollyoaks, played by Julie Peasgood. She appears in 1999 and later leaves in 2001 after 2 years in the show. She has a relationship with Jack Osborne and is the mother of Geri Hudson. She works as a barmaid at The Dog in the Pond for Jack Osborne.

== Sue Morgan ==
Sue Morgan
- Hollyoaks character
- Portrayed by: Eve White (1998–2002); Marian McLoughlin (2021)
- Duration: 1999–2002, 2021
- First appearance: 1 April 1999
- Last appearance: 6 July 2021
- Introduced by: Jo Hallows (1999); Bryan Kirkwood (2021)
In-universe information
- Other names: Sue Smith
- Sisters: Lydia Smith
- Husband: Andy Morgan
- Sons: Adam Morgan; Luke Morgan
- Daughters: Beth Morgan; Zara Morgan
- Grandsons: Oliver Morgan

Sue Morgan, (also Smith) played by Eve White from 1999 to 2002, made her first appearance in April 1999 as part of the Morgan family. Along with her husband Andy and daughter Beth Morgan (Kate Baines) she left to move to France after her daughter was raped and went to prison for reckless driving.

In April 2021, it was announced that Sue would be returning to Hollyoaks, with the role recast to Marian McLoughlin. Joe Anderton of Digital Spy wrote that the reunion between Sue and son Luke (Gary Lucy) would be "frosty", but that her return storyline would be "heartbreaking". McLoughlin said that she loves playing Sue as she "doesn't have a filter and thinks she can say whatever she likes". She described her character as passive aggressive, noting: "she smiles at you, but then there is a real sting in the tail". McLoughlin stated that enjoys portraying Luke's mother and explained that Sue returns to repair her relationship with Luke after her "neglectful mothering in the past". Sue returns to the village to inform Luke that she is dying. Sue's final episode aired on 6 July 2021, where she died.

== Andy Morgan ==
Andy Morgan is a fictional character from the long-running Channel 4 soap opera Hollyoaks, played by Ross Davidson. He arrived in April 1999 as part of the Morgan family and left in 2002. Along with his wife Sue and daughter Beth Morgan he left to move to France after his daughter was raped and went to prison for reckless driving.

In October 2017, Luke mentioned that Andy had died. Luke was living in Canada at the time. Adam called to tell him that Andy was ill and he needed to return to England. Luke got drunk and wasn't allowed to board the plane and Andy died the following day. Luke was devastated he did not get a chance to say goodbye to his father.

== Beth Morgan ==
Beth Morgan
- Hollyoaks character
- Portrayed by: Elizabeth O'Grady (1999−2000); Kate Baines (2001−2002)
- Duration: 1999–2002
- First appearance: 10 May 1999
- Last appearance: 25 October 2002
- Introduced by: Jo Hallows
- Spin-off appearances: Hollyoaks: Indecent Behaviour (2001)
In-universe information
- Occupation: Student
- Father: Andy Morgan
- Mother: Sue Morgan
- Brothers: Adam Morgan; Luke Morgan
- Sisters: Zara Morgan
- Nephews: Oliver Morgan

Beth Morgan, played by Elizabeth O'Grady between 1999 and 2000 and Kate Baines between 2001 and 2002, made her first on screen appearance on 10 May 1999. Beth is introduced as part of the Morgan family, consisting of parents Andy Morgan (Ross Davidson) and Sue Morgan (Eve White) and children Beth, Adam Morgan (David Brown), Luke Morgan (Gary Lucy) and Zara Morgan (Kelly Greenwood).

Beth arrives in Hollyoaks village with her family and quickly catches the attention of Lewis Richardson (Ben Hull), Tony Hutchinson (Nick Pickard) and Rory "Finn" Finnigan (James Redmond). She dates Lewis until he realises that Beth is too young for him. Beth then begins a relationship with Rob Hawthorne (Warren Derosa). Andy is warned about Rob, so he forbids Beth from seeing Rob. When Beth overhears Lucy Benson (Kerrie Taylor) arguing with Rob about his actions, Beth ends their relationship. When Luke reveals that he has been raped, he, Beth and Sue go on holiday to France. Luke and Sue later return and reveal that Beth has decided to stay in France after becoming engaged.

Two years later, Beth returns home. She is raped by footballer Scott Anderson (Daniel Hyde) (see Hollyoaks: Indecent Behaviour). Beth decides not to tell anyone, but eventually confides in Luke before he leaves for Canada. Beth works with journalist Alyson Turner (Sarah Jayne Steed) to incriminate Scott for rape. After releasing her story to the press, Beth has to tell Andy and Sue about her rape, who promise to stand by Beth. Beth's case reached court, where Scott is acquitted of rape. Beth becomes focused on revenge towards Scott; she receives support from Sam "O.B." O'Brien (Darren Jeffries) and they have sex. The following day, Beth rejects O.B. and visits Scott at the football training grounds; she spits on him and is arrested.

Beth's obsession with Scott grows and when she sees Izzy Cornwell (Elize du Toit) being physically harassed by Scott, she intervenes. Beth tries scaring Scott and drives towards him, unwittingly knocking him down. Beth is arrested and charged with attempted murder, while Scott is injured and unable to play football professionally. The residents of the village turn against Beth and she is attacked by an inmate while in prison. During Beth's court case, Scott admits to raping Beth and is given a suspended prison sentence for perjury. Beth is sentenced to two months imprisonment for dangerous driving. After being released, Beth struggles to readjust to life and moves to France with Andy and Sue.

== Zara Morgan ==
Zara Morgan is a fictional character from the long-running Channel 4 soap opera Hollyoaks, played by Kelly Greenwood between 1999 and 2005 and again from 2021 to 2023.

== Kerri ==
Kerri
- Hollyoaks character
- Portrayed by: Sarah Vandenbergh
- First appearance: 29 July 1999
- Last appearance: 28 December 1999
- Introduced by: Jo Hallows

Kerri played by Sarah Vandenbergh, first appeared in July 1999. Kerri was the Australian girlfriend of Adam Morgan (David Brown) who arrived in Hollyoaks to see him. Kerri shared a kiss with Adam's father Andy Morgan Ross Davidson, but told him that their kiss meant nothing. Kerri soon got bored of Hollyoaks and asked Adam to leave with her. Adam rejected Kerri's offer as he had enrolled in Hollyoaks Community College, so Kerri left alone.

== Mark Gibbs ==
Mark Gibbs
- Hollyoaks character
- Portrayed by: Colin Parry
- Duration: 1999–2000, 2017
- First appearance: 10 August 1999
- Last appearance: 15 December 2017
- Introduced by: Jo Hallows (1999); Bryan Kirkwood (2017)
- Spin-off appearances: Hollyoaks: Breaking Boundaries (2000)
In-universe information
- Brothers: Cam Gibbs; 2 others
- Wife: Jenna Gibbs

Mark Gibbs, played by Colin Parry, made his first appearance on 10 August 1999 and departed in October 2000. Parry reprised the role on 21 November 2017 until 15 December 2017.

Mark is a student at Hollyoaks High School. He is a cruel, spiteful bully, who takes special delight in tormenting classmate, Luke Morgan (Gary Lucy). At a football training session, Luke inadvertently injures Mark's leg. Mark is angered when he learns that his injury means he will never play football professionally. While recovering in hospital, Mark decides to get even with Luke by calling his brothers to beat him up. Mark and his friends continue to trouble Luke when he is training; however, with help from Darren Osborne (Ashley Taylor Dawson), Luke puts Mark in his place.

During the late night special Hollyoaks: Breaking Boundaries, Mark and his friends beat Luke up in the changing rooms after a football match. The group chase Luke through the streets of Chester. Mark rapes Luke over the bonnet of his car while his horrified friends look on. The following day, Mark calls round to the Morgan house to see Luke and denies that he raped him. Luke reports the rape to the police and Mark is arrested and charged. The case goes to trial and Luke courageously testifies. Mark lies in court, claiming that Luke is making it all up. Mark is found guilty and sentenced to eight years in prison.

Eighteen years later, Mark is walking along the river in Chester and is spotted by Luke. Mark is now married and has two children. His wife, Jenna Gibbs (Laura Hopper), has no idea he is a rapist and instead believes he was in prison for GBH. Mark receives a message expressing interest in buying his car from him a woman named Nancy (Jessica Fox), who is actually Luke using his friend's picture. When Mark's home is broken into, he goes to speak to the police and sees Nancy, who does not recognize him. When Mark sees Nancy with Luke he puts everything together. Mark shows up at the Osborne house and confronts Luke. Luke admits he broke into Mark's house and that he spoke to Jenna. Luke brings up the rape and Mark shows no remorse for what he did. Mark warns Luke that if he does not stay away from his family he will do much worse to him. Luke follows Mark into the village and emotionally explains how the rape has ruined his life. Mark says he paid for the crime by going to prison. Luke tells him that he just wants him to acknowledge what he did and apologise. When Jenna arrives, Luke tells her that Mark raped him. Jenna runs off and Mark asks Luke why he just could not leave that one night in the past. Luke tells Mark he did it all to himself.

== Geri Hudson ==
Geri Hudson (previously Cunliffe) is a fictional character from the long-running Channel 4 soap opera Hollyoaks, played by Joanna Taylor. She first appeared in 1999 before leaving in 2001 after two years in the show.

== Alex Bell ==
Alex Bell
- Hollyoaks character
- Portrayed by: Martino Lazzeri
- Duration: 1999–2002
- First appearance: September 1999
- Last appearance: 2002
- Introduced by: Jo Hallows
In-universe information
- Occupation: Student
- Sons: Charlie Green

Alexander "Alex" Bell was played by Martino Lazzeri. He first appeared in September 1999 before leaving 3 years later in 2002.

Alex arrived in Hollyoaks as a student and a computer nerd freak, who moved into Tony Hutchinson’s student house. Alex began dating a girl on the internet, and decided to visit her in Ireland. However he was shocked to discover that she had died and her parents had been sending the emails. Soon, Alex went on a trip with the lads on Rory Finnigan’s stag night in Barcelona, where he was chased by angry transvestite who stole his money belt. When Alex returned to Hollyoaks, he began to realise that he had feelings for Anna Green, but he was sidetracked when he discovered that he is infertile. Alex confided to Anna about his infertility and Anna told Geri Hudson, whilst Geri spread the gossip. Alex began to find it difficult coming to terms with his infertility and took it out on Anna for telling Geri. Meanwhile, Alex heard Chloe on the radio, making jokes about infertility and assumed she was having a dig at him. He exacted revenge by having a one-night stand with her and dumping her the next morning.

Alex's dad arrived to patch things up with his son after years of no contact and Anna was shocked that Alex's father was gay. Alex refused to speak to his father, but finally began to realise how unkind he had been to Anna. Alex apologised to Anna for his behaviour and the pair finally got together. However, Alex's life went from bad to worse when Anna revealed she was pregnant, but Alex was adamant that he couldn't be the father of Anna's baby because of his infertility. Alex accused Anna of having an affair with Adam Morgan, but later discovered that the hospital had made a mistake and he was not infertile after all. Alex apologised to Anna, but was adamant that he didn't want the baby and offered Anna money to pay for an abortion. Despite Alex's attempts for Anna to have an abortion, Anna decided that she would give birth and then gave the baby up for adoption. When Anna gave birth to her child, Alex saw his child and was finally convinced that he wanted to keep him. Alex applied for Parental Responsibility and named the child Charlie, however Anna refused to accept the child. Alex was granted Parental Responsibility of Charlie and Anna realised that she has no choice but to try to make things work.

Anna and Alex both decide to provide the best for Charlie and they got a flat together to take tentative steps towards life as a family. As Alex presumed that Anna was happy, he was shocked and devastated when Anna revealed that she slept with Max Cunningham. Alex was shattered even more when Anna made it clear that she no longer loved him and moved in with the Cunninghams. Alex tried his best to persuade her to stay and asked her to marry him, but Anna made it clear that it is over between them. Slowly with the support of Becca Hayton, Alex saw Charlie as much as he could and began to date Becca. Alex than planned to take Charlie and Becca to live in Hong Kong for a new job offer he received without telling Anna. Alex's plan went well, but it reached a climax, when Anna made a mad rush at the airport to stop Alex taking away her son. Anna managed to catch Alex, and persuaded him to hand over Charlie, whilst Alex told Becca that he never loved her. Alex left Hollyoaks for Hong Kong, without Anna, Becca or Charlie, hoping that one day he could be reunited with his son.

Lorna Cooper from MSN TV listed Alex of one of Soap Opera's "forgotten characters". Merle Brown of the Daily Record criticised Alex during the baby storyline, writing "Alex. Is he a prat, or is he a prat? Honestly. Why Anna would want to go near him is beyond me. After finally admitting that he is the father of her unborn child, he decides to leave her with the decision about what to do with it."

== Nikki Sullivan ==
Nikki Sullivan
- Hollyoaks character
- Portrayed by: Wendy Glenn
- Duration: 1999–2000
- First appearance: 13 September 1999
- Last appearance: 28 September 2000
- Introduced by: Jo Hallows
- Spin-off appearances: Hollyoaks: Breaking Boundaries (2000)
In-universe information
- Occupation: Student
- Husband: Dan Sanders (2000)

Nikki Sullivan is a fictional character from the British Channel 4 soap opera Hollyoaks, played by Wendy Glenn, from 1999 to 2000. Nikki appeared as a fresher at Hollyoaks Community College.

Nikki arrived in Hollyoaks village with her boyfriend, Dan Sanders (Joseph May). In 1999, Dan and Nikki stole a car and went for a joyride, in which Steven Banks was fatally struck by their vehicle. Dan was sent to prison for dangerous driving, but was released later that year. Nikki began dating Sam Smallwood (Tim Downie), but she reunited with Dan when he was released from prison. In March 2000, Dan and Nikki went to visit the Banks family to apologize, but Dan was nearly assaulted by Steven's son Justin, who, as well as Steven's wife Linda, refused to ever forgive Dan and Nikki, and asked for them to never return again. Dan and Nikki got engaged and decided to have a secret wedding whilst on a ski trip. The wedding was revealed and Nikki and Dan invited all their friends. However, Sam tried to convince Nikki not to marry Dan, however, Nikki ignored Sam and married Dan. Afterwards, Nikki realized she had made a mistake marrying Dan, and a devastated Dan skied off. Nikki was unable to catch up, so Sam went after him. Dan ended up taking a tumble down a ski slope, and Nikki feared he was dead. She went to the room and found his things gone, and they realized Dan was alive. The group were all furious at Nikki for making the holiday all about her and ruining it. However, they ended up forgiving her. Nikki returned to Hollyoaks with her friends, and without Dan. She kissed Emily Taylor (Lorna Pegler), who wanted to start a relationship with Nikki, but Nikki rejected her. Nikki rekindled her relationship with Sam. They decided to leave the village together in September 2000.

== Sam Smallwood ==
Sam Smallwood
- Hollyoaks character
- Portrayed by: Tim Downie
- Duration: 1999–2000
- First appearance: 14 September 1999
- Last appearance: 28 September 2000
- Introduced by: Jo Hallows

Sam Smallwood is a fictional character from the British Channel 4 soap opera Hollyoaks, played by Tim Downie, appearing from 1999 to 2000. Sam was a student at Hollyoaks Community College. He was a flatmate of Alex Bell (Martino Lazzeri) and fell for Nikki Sullivan (Wendy Glenn). They started dating when Nikki's boyfriend Dan Sanders, was sent to prison, but broke up when Nikki reunited with Dan after he was released. Sam discovered Nikki and Dan's plans to secretly marry whilst they, Sam and their friends were on a skiing trip in Switzerland, and he revealed this to the group the day before the wedding. Sam was unable to stop Nikki from marrying Dan, however afterwards, Nikki realised that she had made a mistake and ended things with Dan. Sam went after Dan but they had an argument, leading to Dan falling down a ski slope to his death. However the stop and search rescue team failed to find Dan's body and the group returned to the hut to discover all of Dan's belongings gone, revealing that he was in fact alive. Sam and Nikki decided to rekindle their relationship, and decided to leave the village together in September 2000.

== Christine Woodhead ==
Christine Woodhead
- Hollyoaks character
- Portrayed by: Hannah Curtis
- Duration: 1999–2000
- First appearance: 27 September 1999
- Last appearance: 21 February 2000
- Introduced by: Jo Hallows
In-universe information
- Occupation: Film studies lecturer

Christine Woodhead is a fictional character from the British Channel 4 soap opera Hollyoaks, played by Hannah Curtis. Christine is a lecturer at Hollyoaks Community College, teaching film studies. Christine begins an affair with Adam Morgan (David Brown), whilst Adam also sleeps with Geri Hudson (Joanna Taylor). Ruth Osborne (Terri Dwyer) catches Christine and Adam together, and Christine falsely accuses Adam of sexual harassment and assault. Adam's family try to get Christine to change her mind but she refuses, however, on the day of the tribunal, Geri admits to seeing Christine and Adam together. Matt Musgrove (Kristian Ealey) also corroborates Geri's version of events, and Christine is fired.

== Dan Sanders ==
Dan Sanders
- Hollyoaks character
- Portrayed by: Joseph May
- Duration: 1999–2000
- First appearance: 18 November 1999
- Last appearance: 17 April 2000
- Introduced by: Jo Hallows
In-universe information
- Occupation: Labourer
- Wife: Nikki Sullivan (2000)

Dan Sanders is a fictional character from the British Channel 4 soap opera Hollyoaks, played by Joseph May, between 1999 and 2000. Dan was the boyfriend of Nikki Sullivan (Wendy Glenn). In late 1999, Dan and Nikki got drunk and stole a car upon Nikki's insistence, taking it for a joyride. They were involved in a car accident, which resulted in the death of Steven Banks. Dan was sent to prison for dangerous driving, but was later released in 2000. After his release, Dan and Nikki went to visit the Banks family to apologize, however Dan was nearly attacked by Steven's son Justin and his wife Linda, who refused to ever forgive Dan and Nikki for Steven's death. Dan and Nikki got engaged and decided to have a secret wedding whilst on a ski trip to Switzerland. Nikki's ex-flame Sam Smallwood (Tim Downie) revealed their plan and tried to persuade Nikki not to marry Dan. Nikki ignored Sam's pleas and married Dan but then realised that she had made a mistake, leaving Dan heartbroken and he skied off alone. Sam followed Dan and a fight ensued, which resulted in Dan taking a fall down a ski slope. Sam raised the alarm but the rescue teams failed to retrieve a body. Nikki discovered Dan's belongings missing, and realised that he had left without saying goodbye to her, or any of their friends. Dan later returned and confronted Nikki for jilting him after the ceremony. He accused her of only sticking by him because of the accident, to which Nikki protested that she loved Dan and didn't want to hurt him. She asked if they could remain friends, but he told her to rot in hell before leaving.

== Anna Green ==
Anna Green is a fictional character on the long-running Channel 4 British television soap opera Hollyoaks, played by actress Lisa M. Kay between 1999 and 2002.

== Cam Gibbs ==
Cam Gibbs
- Hollyoaks character
- Portrayed by: Raymond Dobbs
- Duration: 1999–2000
- First appearance: 1999
- Last appearance: 2000
- Introduced by: Jo Hallows
- Spin-off appearances: Hollyoaks: The Movie (2000)
In-universe information
- Brothers: Mark Gibbs; 2 others

Cam Gibbs is a fictional character on the long-running Channel 4 British television soap opera Hollyoaks. He appeared recurringly from 1999 to 2000 as one of the brothers of Mark Gibbs (Colin Parry). When Luke Morgan (Gary Lucy) injured Mark during a game of football, Cam and his other brothers attacked Luke as revenge. When Luke reported Mark to the police for raping him, Cam sent him threatening letters and threw a brick through the window. However, Luke's brother Adam Morgan (David Brown) caught Cam and warned him that he would call the police if he ever saw him again. Cam tried to help Mark evade the police, but Mark was caught and arrested.

After Mark was sent to prison for raping Luke, Luke was harassed with threatening texts and mysterious calls. Luke's car was also stolen, which he and Darren Osborne (Ashley Taylor Dawson) found on fire in a field. In Hollyoaks: The Movie, Luke, Darren and Mandy Richardson (Sarah Jayne Dunn) confronted Cam, but Cam attacked Mandy and chased Darren and Luke in his car. He rear-ended the pair several times, but ended up getting lost when Darren and Luke drove through a fence and through a field. He eventually caught up to them at a garage, where Luke's car had broken down. Darren and Luke broke into the building and Cam followed. Cam tried to attack Luke but Darren intervened. Darren ended up pushing Cam onto an air compressor which Luke had accidentally turned on during the fight. Darren and Luke hid until Cam exploded. Darren covered up the crime by telling Luke to clean the mess, whilst he burned Cam's tracksuit and disposed of his car. The pair then agreed to never talk about the incident again.

== Stephen MacGregor ==
Stephen MacGregor
- Hollyoaks character
- Portrayed by: Unknown (1999–2000); Cameron Hutchinson (2022)
- Duration: 1999–2000, 2022
- First appearance: 1999
- Last appearance: 28 January 2022
- Introduced by: Jo Hallows (1999); Lucy Allan (2022)
- Spin-off appearances: Hollyoaks: The Movie (2000)
In-universe information
- Brothers: Mark Gibbs; Cam Gibbs

Stephen MacGregor is a fictional character on the long-running Channel 4 British television soap opera Hollyoaks. He appeared recurringly from 1999 to 2000 as one of the brothers of Mark Gibbs (Colin Parry). The actor playing Stephen was not credited in any appearances from 1999 to 2000. After Mark began a rivalry with Luke Morgan (Gary Lucy), Stephen and Kenneth Boyd would help Mark terrorise Luke. In January 2000, Stephen slashed Luke's car tyres and attacked him when Luke confronted him, telling Luke that he had ruined his brother's career. Stephen, Mark and Kenny cornered Luke in the changing rooms, putting his clothes in the toilet and trashing the room so the caretaker would blame Luke. After Luke threw a rock through Mark's car windscreen and slammed his leg in the car door, a car chase ensued, with the group catching up to Luke when his car got stuck in a pothole. Kenny and Stephen pinned Luke to his car, and Mark raped Luke. Despite putting Luke through a horrific ordeal, Stephen, Kenny and Mark would continue to taunt Luke until he reported them for the rape in May 2000. They were later arrested and had bail refused. At the trial in October 2000, the trio were found guilty on charges of rape and actual bodily harm. The judge sentenced Kenny and Stephen to 3 years, 6 months imprisonment for being an accomplice, whilst Mark was sentenced to 8 years.

In August 2021, Luke's fiancée Cindy Cunningham (Stephanie Waring) and sister Zara Morgan (Kelly Condron) discovered that their mother Sue (Marian McLoughlin) had been visiting Stephen from at least December 2001. Cindy later wrote to Stephen, warning him to stay away from Hollyoaks. However, Luke's son Oliver Morgan (Gabriel Clark) contacted Stephen in January 2022 in order to meet with him, leading to Stephen bumping into Luke. Luke - suffering from frontotemporal dementia - did not recognise Stephen, who attempted to apologise to Luke for what he put him through. However, Luke's sister Zara was enraged by his arrival and prepared to hit him with a rock: only not doing so as Ollie stopped her. Stephen left the village afterwards.

== Sorcha Donnelly ==
Sorcha Donnelly
- Hollyoaks character
- Portrayed by: Ali Coffey
- Duration: 1999–2000
- First appearance: 20 December 1999
- Last appearance: 1 May 2000
- Introduced by: Jo Hallows
In-universe information
- Mother: Mrs Donnelly
- Sisters: Caitlin Donnelly

Sorcha Donnelly, played by Ali Coffey, was the girlfriend of Alex Bell (Martino Lazzeri). Alex met Sorcha's sister Caitlin through a dating website. He traveled to Northern Ireland to meet Caitlin, only to discover that she had died and her parents were sending the emails. Alex met Sorcha and they started exchanging emails when Alex returned to England. Alex's friend Matt Musgrove (Kristian Ealey) began emailing Sorcha from Alex's account and she arrived in Chester in April 2000. Sorcha grew suspicious when Alex couldn't recall what was said in the emails, and he admitted the truth and that he was a virgin. Sorcha admitted that she was a virgin and they slept together before she returned to Northern Ireland.

== Tom Cunningham ==
Thomas "Tom" Cunningham is a fictional character from the British Channel 4 soap opera Hollyoaks, played by Ellis Hollins. Hollins has portrayed the character since 2003.
