= Colin Parry (actor) =

English actor

Colin Parry (born 1977) is an English actor, known for portraying the role of Mark Gibbs in the Channel 4 soap opera, Hollyoaks, from 1999 to 2000, before reprising the role in 2017, and Aiden in Two Pints of Lager and a Packet of Crisps. In September 2011, he played Leon Southam in the ITV soap opera, Coronation Street. In September 2019, he appeared in an episode of the BBC One medical soap opera, Doctors as Kenny Monteaux.
