= Mandy Richardson =

Fictional character from Hollyoaks

- Hollyoaks character
- Portrayed by: Sarah Jayne Dunn
- Duration: 1996–2008, 2010–2011, 2017–2021
- First appearance: Episode 45; 7 October 1996
- Last appearance: Episode 5751; 27 December 2021
- Introduced by: Jo Hallows (1996); Bryan Kirkwood (2007, 2008, 2017); Paul Marquess (2010)
- Spin-off appearances: Hollyoaks: Back from the Dead (2006); Hollyoaks Later (2013)
In-universe information
- Other names: Mandy Hutchinson; Mandy Morgan; Mandy Osborne
- Occupation: Waitress; Wedding planner; Spa manager
- Father: Dennis Richardson
- Mother: Helen Cunningham
- Stepfather: Gordon Cunningham
- Brothers: Lewis Richardson
- Half-brothers: Tom Cunningham
- Husband: Tony Hutchinson (2005–2006); Luke Morgan (2018–2019); Darren Osborne (2021–2022)
- Sons: DJ
- Daughters: Grace Hutchinson; Ella Richardson
- Stepsons: Beau Ramsey; Harry Thompson; Oliver Morgan
- Nieces: Steph Cunningham-Lomax

Mandy Richardson (also Hutchinson and Morgan) is a fictional character from the British Channel 4 soap opera Hollyoaks, played by Sarah Jayne Dunn. She first appeared on 7 October 1996 and has been involved in various storylines, including dealing with sexual abuse while she was a child by her father Dennis (David McAllister), the suicide of her brother Lewis (Ben Hull), and an on-off relationship with Tony Hutchinson (Nick Pickard) before the couple married. Mandy had a miscarriage causing her to hit Tony. Mandy and Tony had a daughter together who they named Grace, only for her to die from sudden infant death syndrome. This led to the character and Dunn's exit from the serial in 2006. Dunn made a brief return in 2007 before making a return for six months in 2008. Dunn reprised her role as Mandy in 2010; in September 2011, Dunn announced her departure from the soap, and Mandy made her last appearance on 2 September 2011 before departing off-screen. Dunn later returned to her role in the sixth series of Hollyoaks Later in October 2013. In June 2017, it was announced that Dunn had reprised the role again and that Mandy would appear from July alongside Luke Morgan, played by Gary Lucy. Mandy returned on 26 July 2017. In November 2021, it was announced that Dunn's contract with Hollyoaks had been terminated due to starting an OnlyFans; viewers of the soap criticised the decision and Dunn herself voiced her disappointment with the production team. Her final scenes aired on 27 December 2021, and Mandy was given an off-screen departure on 31 January 2022.

== Storylines ==
=== 1996–2008 ===
Mandy first appears as a schoolgirl who dreams of becoming a model and becomes romantically involved with Ollie Benson (Paul Leyshon). It is revealed that Mandy's father Dennis (David McAllister) had sexually and physically abused her when she was younger. Mandy takes a stand against her father and he is sentenced to seven years in prison. Mandy's life slowly returns to normal and she begins a relationship with Luke Morgan (Gary Lucy). When Luke is raped by Mark Gibbs (Colin Parry), he feels ashamed and ends his and Mandy's relationship. Unaware of the true reasons for Luke splitting up with her, Mandy embarks on short-lived relationships with Darren Osborne (Ashley Taylor Dawson) and Ben Davies (Marcus Patric). Luke admits the true reasons for ending the relationship to Mandy, who agrees to support him.

Mandy is then shocked to discover that her mother Helen Cunningham (Kathryn George) is expecting a baby with Gordon Cunningham (Bernard Latham) but Mandy helps deliver her half-brother, Tom (Ellis Hollins). Mandy's life got changed when her brother Lewis Richardson (Ben Hull) commits suicide following debt problems, which causes Mandy and Helen's relationship to suffer. After Mandy and Jamie Nash (Stefan Booth) sleep together, Adam Morgan (David Brown) confronts her about her behaviour and the pair are involved in a car accident, which leaves Adam paralysed. Mandy and local barman Toby Mills (Henry Luxembourg) begin a short relationship, which Toby ends. Mandy and Adam then begin a secret relationship, which ends when she sleeps with Luke again. Due to losing both Adam and Luke, Mandy confides in friend Laura Burns (Lesley Crawford), who becomes obsessed with Mandy. Laura attacks Mandy and locks her in her flat, later attempting to kill her. Mandy's stepbrother Max Cunningham (Matt Littler) rescues her with the help of Adam, Tony Hutchinson (Nick Pickard), Becca Hayton (Ali Bastian) and Laura's brother Brendan. Laura is later sectioned.

Mandy discovers her mother is having an affair with Tony, which soon ends, and also discovers that her father, who is dying of liver cancer, is being released from prison. After Dennis' release, Mandy confronts him and refuses to forgive him. She then buys him alcohol to make his death come sooner. When he eventually does die, Mandy begins to rebuild her life, turning to Tony for support despite his former affair with Helen. They become a couple, but soon cheat on each other; Tony with Ruth Osborne (Terri Dwyer) and Mandy with Ben. Despite this, they continue their relationship. When Helen and Gordon are killed in a car accident, Mandy is given guardianship of Tom, but later puts him in Max's care. Mandy's emotional turmoil worsens when she suffers a miscarriage, which causes her to hit Tony. After Tony is arrested for hitting her back, Mandy admits to abusing him first, they seek counselling and eventually marry in Rome. Shortly after returning, Mandy falls pregnant and gives birth to Grace Hutchinson. Grace dies of Sudden Infant Death Syndrome. A devastated Mandy is unable to talk to Tony about her daughter's death, turning instead to his brother Dominic Reilly (John Pickard). After sharing a brief kiss, Mandy leaves Tony and the village.

Mandy returns in 2007 for Becca's funeral after she is killed in prison. Mandy tells Tony that she is pregnant and in a serious relationship with a man named Mark. Months later, Tony receives a letter from Mandy informing him that she had given birth to a girl named Ella. Mandy returns to Hollyoaks again in June 2008 with Ella to attend the wedding of Max to Steph Dean (Carley Stenson). On her arrival, she reveals she and Mark have split up. Mandy and Tony's partner Jacqui McQueen (Claire Cooper) begin a feud, Jacqui believing Mandy to be a threat. After the wedding, Max is run over and killed by Niall Rafferty (Barry Sloane). Mandy then decides to stay in Hollyoaks, becoming a wedding planner with Louise Summers (Roxanne McKee). Mandy works closely with Louise's fiancé Warren Fox (Jamie Lomas), which causes Louise to become suspicious of them. Mandy's stepsister Cindy Cunningham (Stephanie Waring) then makes Louise believe Mandy and Warren are having an affair. However, this pushes Warren further away from Louise, who turns to alcohol. Following more accusations from a drunken Louise, Mandy and Warren sleep together and begin an affair. Louise apologises for her behaviour. Cindy is suspicious of Mandy and Warren after finding Mandy's underwear. Louise then attacks Cindy, believing she is trying to split her and Warren up.

Warren ends his affair with Mandy, who, devastated, tells Louise the truth. After slapping Mandy, Louise tells her that Warren had murdered her previous husband, Sean Kennedy (Matthew Jay Lewis). A shocked Mandy reluctantly agrees to set Warren up before stealing his money. However, unknown to Mandy, Louise plots to kill Warren and frame her. On the wedding day, CCTV footage of Warren and Mandy is shown to the wedding guests by Jacqui and Myra McQueen (Nicole Barber-Lane). Warren finds the gun Louise had planned to kill him with, resulting in him confronting and then suffocating her. Mandy decides to leave the village once more with Tony. Tony and Mandy go travelling, deciding to give their relationship another go. However, when Mandy tells Tony that she may not be able to have children of her own anymore, he is upset and returns to Hollyoaks, leaving Mandy stranded in a foreign country.

=== 2010–2011 ===
In October 2010, Mandy arrives at Steph's house. Darren asks Mandy why she is back and she reveals she came back to see Steph. Mandy and Tony talk over a bottle of wine and almost kiss. Mandy and Frankie Osborne (Helen Pearson) argue over custody of Tom. Tony begins to avoid Mandy after seeing her, so she confronts him about why he left her abroad. It is revealed that Mandy is in a relationship with Warren and they are planning to take revenge on Tony. Mandy discovers Tony is in debt and Dom had gone to Warren for money. Tony's restaurant Il Gnosh is burned down by an unseen arsonist. The fire spreads and Steph and Malachy Fisher (Glen Wallace) are killed. Mandy then meets Warren, believing he caused the fire. Panicking, she attempts to end their relationship, but he manipulates her after convincing her that he is the only person she can talk to and that he will solve all of her problems.

Mandy tells Tony that she wants to get custody of Tom, angering Frankie who tells Mandy she will not let her take Tom. Mandy tells Frankie that she will get custody because she is Tom's legal guardian. After months of Warren receiving threatening text messages, Mandy is exposed as his stalker. Mandy leaves the village after she tells Tony she originally wanted revenge on him and tells Tom she will be back for him. Mandy arrives at Cinergy after Cindy appoints her as manager. Upset about the way Cindy is spending Texas Longford's (Bianca Hendrickse-Spendlove) deceased grandfather's money, Mandy teams up with Texas and they decided to make fake art pictures so Cindy will buy them. Cindy discovers that Mandy has been scamming her but later forgives her, telling her she would have given her money if she needed it. Mandy and Tony reignite their relationship and begin living together. Tony and Mandy begin looking for jobs and after Tony gets a job as a chef he returns home to discover Mandy has left him a note and has left Hollyoaks.

=== 2017–2021 ===
Mandy returns six years later when it is revealed that she and Luke are back together. Mandy makes Luke promise that he will call her when he is on verge of drinking alcohol. However, Luke continues to drink alcohol continuously. Mandy is later revealed as Warren's secret stalker, after she begins sending him anonymous text messages and threats. Mandy continues to stalk Warren further, but when he attempts to threaten her, Mandy threatens to tell his fiancée Sienna Blake (Anna Passey) about his affair with Grace Black (Tamara Wall). Due to Luke's alcohol habit becoming uncontrollable, social services decide to take Mandy's daughter Ella Richardson (Erin Palmer), into temporary foster care as they feel that Ella is not safe with Luke's alcohol addiction. Mandy later kicks Luke out and turns to Tony. Tony attempts to help her but Mandy kidnaps Ella. However Ella runs away from the garden of the Cunningham household, leading to Cindy's lodger Milo Entwistle (Nathan Morris) finding her and taking her to the police station. Mandy is arrested, but released and Ella is put back into care. Mandy becomes suspicious of Milo as he becomes obsessed in getting the Cunningham family back together. When an unknown person puts a threatening graffiti on Tom's car, Mandy and Cindy agree that Tom should move in with the Cunninghams. The Osborne's refuse but realizing how save Tom will be, they agree. Later that day it is revealed that Milo was responsible for the death of Mandy's mother and stepdad when as a youth, he accidentally crashed his van into Helen and Gordon's car. When Mandy wants to get a job at The Hutch in order to prove to social services that she is suitable to get Ella back, Tony refuses as he is angry at Mandy for always bringing trouble. This causes Mandy to slap him and Diane to kick him out. Diane gives Mandy a free trial at The Hutch, much to Tony's rejection. Tony later apologizes to Mandy leading to a kiss which is interrupted by Diane. Luke returns to reconcile with Mandy but he discovers the kiss between Mandy and Tony leading to a fight between the two men.

After Mandy helps Luke overcome his rapist Mark Gibbs (Colin Parry) once again, they reconcile. She proposes to him and he accepts, despite already being married to a woman named Scarlett (Susie Amy). Mandy later regains custody of Ella after social services can see that she and Luke are functioning as a couple now he's sober again. Mandy's wedding dress becomes damaged by Luke as an attempt to delay the wedding so he can divorce Scarlett in time. Darren takes the blame for damaging the dress, and as Mandy becomes upset she and Darren kiss. They agree to forget the kiss and Mandy and Luke marry. However, during the wedding reception, Luke's teenage son Oliver Morgan (Aedan Duckworth) arrives. Mandy promptly breaks up with Luke and sleeps with Darren, who has himself split from wife Nancy (Jessica Fox). Mandy is left feeling guilty after sleeping with Darren and agrees to give Luke another chance. Mandy and Darren begin an affair behind Luke and Nancy's back. Darren calls off the affair but after Jack has a heart attack, he turns to her for comfort and they kiss. Mandy is surprised to find out about his past with Sienna and confronts Darren. She is further jealous when a drunk Leela Lomax (Kirsty-Leigh Porter) makes a pass at him. Mandy and Darren continue their affair and meet up in the Bean at night, however, they are caught on CCTV. Fortunately, Darren distracts Esther Bloom (Jazmine Franks) long enough for Mandy to delete the footage. Mandy and Luke move into a new flat with Ella and Oliver. Mandy begins to think that Luke may be cheating on her and confides in Darren leading to them sleeping with each other again. However Luke arrives home and Darren hides under the bed. Luke proposes to Mandy and she accepts and they have sex while Darren is under the bed. They decide to get married in Florida but before they are about to leave Darren begs Mandy not to marry him but she does. During Luke's party, Mandy gets jealous when Scarlett gives Luke a present and they have a catfight.

In June 2018, Luke discovers that Mandy is having an affair after finding text messages on her phone and turns to drinking again. Sienna blackmails Mandy and Darren over the affair and demands £2000. Darren refuses to give it to her but Mandy does. Luke suspects Tony to be the mystery man and punches him. Darren ends his marriage to Nancy and him and Mandy decide to run away together. However, Nancy suffers an MS attack and they decide to end their affair. When Nancy finds out that Mandy was going to leave Luke she confronts her and Mandy confesses that it was Darren. Nancy furiously slaps Mandy and Mandy is forced to tell Luke. Luke pleads with Mandy not to leave him and promises to give up drinking but Mandy tells him it's too late. Luke is sentenced to two years in prison for assaulting Scott Drinkwell (Ross Adams). In October 2018, Mandy and Darren decide to give their relationship another go., but Nancy decides to go for revenge. Mandy discovers she is pregnant and tells Darren who is pleased. Mandy supports Darren during the custody hearing, but Nancy finds a worried Mandy in the toilet when she is bleeding. At the hospital, Mandy and Nancy have a heart-to-heart and Nancy decides to end her revenge plan. The doctor tells them that her baby has spina bifida. The next day, Nancy tells Mandy that she needs to tell Darren. Darren continues to support Mandy through her pregnancy, but Mandy starts to doubt whether Darren is the baby's father as the dates do not add up. When Oliver tells Mandy that a relative of Luke's once had spina bifida, Mandy visits Luke in prison and tells him that he might be the father. Mandy keeps the suspicion a secret from Darren, until after the birth of DJ, she is forced to reveal that Darren may not be the father. A DNA test is taken and Oliver revealed Darren as the father but unknown to the pair, Oliver lied about the DNA tests and Luke was the father but he kept it secret for five months.

Luke is released from prison and stays with Mandy and Darren. Mandy is upset to find out that Luke and Cindy had slept together and orders one of them to leave. Luke decides to leave and Darren becomes jealous that Mandy still has feelings for Luke, but she denies this. After regretfully sleeping with Nancy, Darren develops depression and him and Nancy file for divorce. He eventually tells Mandy who is extremely supportive. Darren feels like everyone is starting to treat him differently so he talks to his therapist, he then speaks up and starts to slowly return to his normal self with Mandy's support.

In January 2022 Mandy leaves the village with DJ to start a new life in LA.

In January 2024 Ella is killed in a road accident. Mandy does not attend her funeral and no explanation is given as to why.

== Casting and creation ==
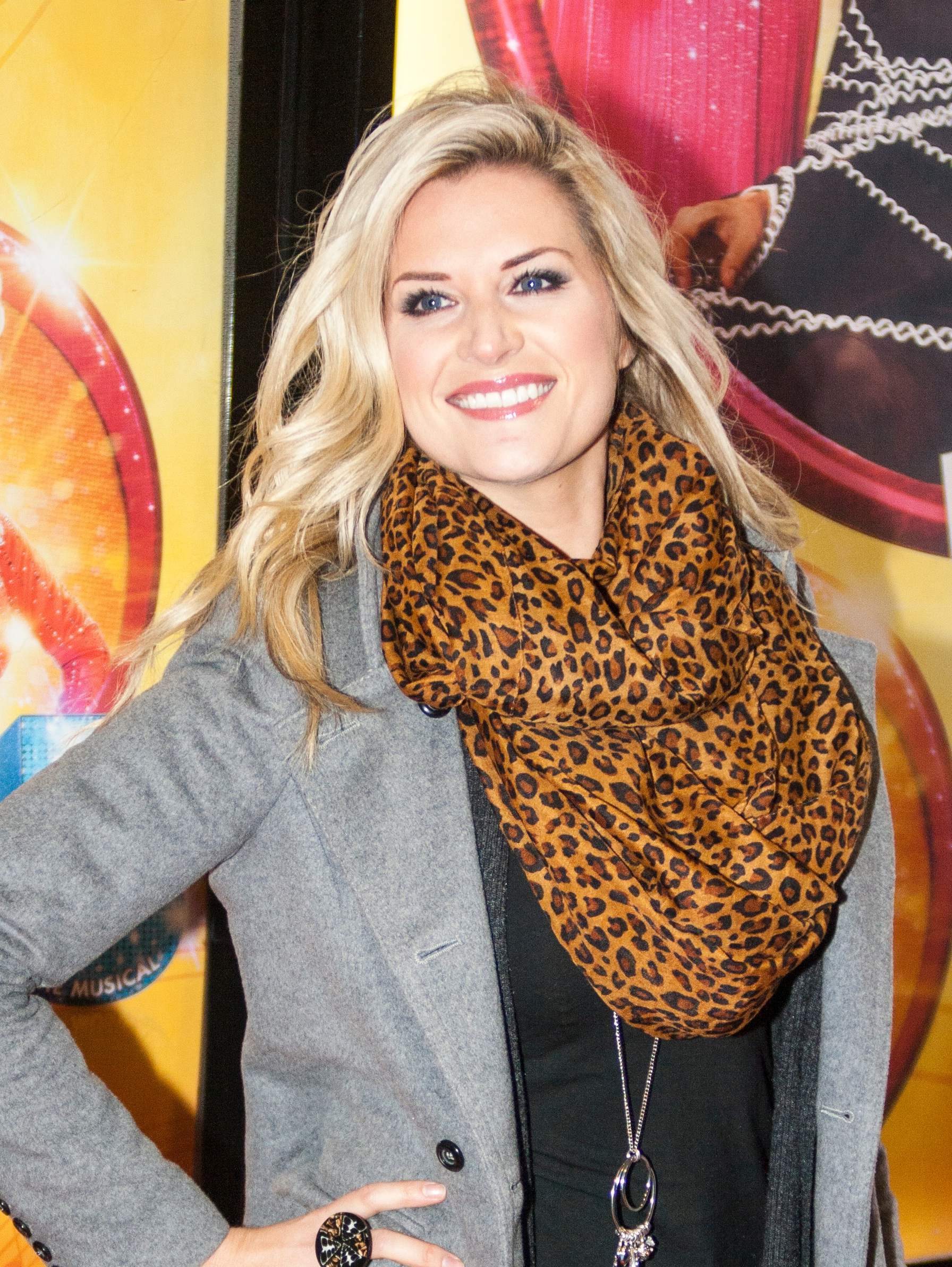
Sarah Jayne Dunn (pictured) plays Mandy.

Sarah Jayne Dunn was cast in 1996 as Mandy, a member of the Richardson family. Dunn told K9 magazine that she began her role aged fourteen and got an audition for the role through her agent. Once she had won the role her "contract just kept getting renewed". Initially Dunn was only contracted to appear in "a handful of episodes" but due to her performance impressing producers her contract was renewed. In May 2006 it was reported that Dunn had decided to leave the serial. This was later denied with a show source telling Digital Spy that an exit had not been confirmed. Dunn's exit was later confirmed. Explaining her decision to leave, Dunn said: "I was at Hollyoaks for 10 years and I always knew I would know when I was ready to leave [...] I probably decided I wanted to leave a couple of years before I did but with the storylines it took another two years. By then, I had completely made up my mind. If I didn't move on then I would never have left". The actress also revealed that she told producers she did not want Mandy to be killed off as she felt it would have been "ridiculous" due to the deaths a large number of her on-screen family.

In 2007, a Hollyoaks source confirmed Dunn had returned to the serial to film Becca Dean's (Ali Bastian) funeral and that during the return Dunn made "such an impact, it would be great to have her back again". In 2008, Dunn signed a 6-month contract to return to the soap. Speaking of her return, Dunn stated: "I always said 'never say never' so it was nice not to be killed off". She later expressed her feelings towards returning: "I felt a bit like the new girl on the first day but within an hour it was as if I'd been there ages. I actually asked to come back. It seemed the right time for my character". Dunn explained that although Mandy had previously made guest returns for Max's funeral and wedding, she "wanted to return and re-establish the character rather than just dip in and out. I've worked quite a lot since and can bring that experience to Mandy, who has changed a lot. I am contracted for six months which means I'll be on-screen until the end of the year — who knows what will happen after that". Series producer Bryan Kirkwood was responsible for reintroducing Mandy and explained that he felt it "was an important time to bring in some old faces". Dunn left the role at the end of her six-month contract. In 2009, it was rumoured that Dunn could make a possible return to the soap for the exit of Jamie Lomas, who plays Warren Fox.

In September 2010, Dunn stated on her Twitter account that she would be returning to Hollyoaks in 2010. It was confirmed on the official Hollyoaks website that she would return on 26 October 2010. Speaking of her return, Dunn stated: "I'm really excited about being a part of the show again and about the storylines that producer Paul Marquess and the rest of the team have in the pipeline for Mandy". Dunn also praised her return storyline, which featured a more edgy side to Mandy, saying: "At the moment she's come back and she's causing loads of trouble. It's quite nice because they put a different spin on the character". She explained that when she was asked to return her return storyline was outlined, which she felt was "brilliant" and "totally unexpected". In September 2011, Dunn revealed she had left Hollyoaks and had already finished filming. Dunn said she felt she had "taken the character as far as possible" and that when she had initially been "asked to come back on the show, I felt Mandy had a much darker side to her. The writers gave me some fantastic storylines [...] and I really had something to get my teeth into". On a future return, Dunn said she would "always come back if the storylines are strong enough".

== Development ==
=== Characterisation ===
Dunn said she does not have "much in common with Mandy. She is really confident and is outgoing. She is opinionated, but I'm more laid back and not quite as bossy [...] I wouldn't go over to a fella and start chatting him up, whereas Mandy would. She is a bit of a flirt and, if she wants a fella, she will go out of her way to get him". Dunn added that Mandy is "a bit confrontational and a bit heartless". A writer for E4's official Hollyoaks website described Mandy by saying "do not leave your man lying around when Mandy Richardson is in the vicinity" and labelling her a "scarlet woman". They added that Mandy is "not just about the illicit stuff though". The Mirror described her as the "whiny, but strangely also rather loveable Mandy". Virgin Media profiled Mandy, saying "Mandy never had it easy". Of her personality, they stated: "a bit of a bossy boots with a domineering personality, she has gone through varying degrees of popularity throughout her Hollyoaks life but has undoubtedly also been put through the mill". John Dingwall of the Daily Record described Mandy as a "sex kitten", a "teenage temptress", "predatory", as having "a reputation as a maneater" and "bitchy".

=== Abuse ===
It is revealed that Mandy's father Dennis (David McAllister) had sexually and physically abused Mandy when she was younger. Dunn noted that in the scripts she realised "weird" events happening surrounding Mandy happening before she was told that Mandy would become involved in a child abuse storyline. Due to Dunn's young age while portraying the storyline she had to give permission and have parental permission to portray the abuse storyline. Dunn stated that she carried out research into the subject before filming the storyline. Dunn praised McAllister, crediting him for making the scenes realistic, saying he "was so believable that I was genuinely scared in the scenes. He would be vicious and just grab hold of me, and all of the fear from me would be real". Mandy runs away from home. Dennis and her brother Lewis Richardson (Ben Hull) track her down, working in a "seedy" Soho lap dancing club. Dunn explained that when Mandy sees Dennis she "can't believe it. It's what she's been dreading since she ran away - the one person she dislikes most in the world turning up on her doorstep". The actress explained Mandy is "terrified and just wants to get away from him as quickly as she can. She can't face the hurt again". While filming the scenes, Dunn and other cast members visited real lap dancing clubs. Dunn felt that this made the scenes "look really convincing".

=== Relationship with Tony Hutchinson ===
Mandy begins a relationship with Tony Hutchinson (Nick Pickard). Dunn said that when she was first informed of the storyline she was surprised due to the age gap between the characters. She added that although she felt the pairing was unlikely, "it did actually work". Tony's ex-girlfriend Ruth Osborne (Terri Dwyer) returns. Mandy becomes jealous when Ruth and Tony spend time together. Mandy deliberately stands Tony up, leaving him alone with Ruth but "Tony doesn't do anything because he loves Mandy". Dwyer explained that when Tony discovers what Mandy has done he "can't believe that she didn't trust him; and begins to wonder whether their relationship is as good as he thinks it is". Ruth and Tony sleep together leaving Tony feeling guilty. Tony tells Mandy, who admits she has also cheated on him, and the couple continue their relationship.

Following her mother's death and becoming Tom's guardian, Mandy "struggles with her temper". Mandy discovers she is pregnant and "Tony proves his commitment" to her. Dunn explained that Mandy is "certainly shocked" by her pregnancy but due to the recent events the pregnancy could "push her over the edge". Dunn revealed that viewers "might be surprised by some of the things she does over the next few months". Mandy becomes violent towards Tony and the couple decide to have a termination. The following year, the couple marry and Mandy becomes pregnant again. Dunn said that Mandy has "grown up a lot since she was pregnant the first time". She explained that "Tony presumes Mandy is going to want a termination after her violent reaction to becoming pregnant last year. But things are different now - she's married, they've got a nice flat and she's been bonding properly with her little brother, Tom". Tony books a vasectomy so that the couple will not have the problem again. Dunn felt that Tony is "trying to be a doting husband, he adores Mandy and wants her to realise that the most important thing to him is being with her". This leads Mandy to believe Tony does not want the baby so she books a termination. The actress expressed that Mandy and Tony would "be surprised at how they both feel. They've finally learned to love each other and the relationship has grown stronger, so maybe they've got a real chance of building a happy family together". Mandy and Tony realise they both want the baby so she does not go through with the termination. Mandy gives birth to a daughter, who the couple name Grace Hutchinson.

Mandy and Tony lose Grace to Sudden Infant Death Syndrome. Dunn said that the "cot death storyline was one of my highlights on the show – as much as it was really difficult. By that stage, Nick and I both knew how we would play things and it worked". Mandy and Tony left to travel but he later returned alone. In 2010 Mandy returned, Dunn explained that "Mandy told Tony she couldn't have more children and he freaked out and left her in Laos". She added that this is "why she wants her revenge". She felt that this "is a different Mandy. I think she's having some sort of breakdown". Dunn explained that Mandy entered a relationship with Warren as part of her revenge and is "passionate about him, but he's just using her [...] She knows he's not good for her but she's in too deep now. Also he's very clever with his mind games..." Mandy later ends her relationship with Warren and admits to Tony that she initially wanted revenge. Tony leaves to go travelling and upon his return he has re-invented himself which Mandy is not impressed by. Pickard commented that "Underneath it all, Tony is still the same person and he loves Mandy". He added that if the couple had not "lost a child, they might have stayed together the first time round. They were really happy before that happened". On 13 September 2011, speaking about the couple's future, Dunn told Taryn Davies of Femalefirst: "they've been on and off for years and they're a great couple and I think that they make a great couple and I think it's such a shame that just as they get happy something horrendous happens again. So there's the possibility that their relationship might be re-kindled".

=== 2021 departure ===
Throughout her career, Dunn has been pictured wearing lingerie for glamour photography which she has shared on her Instagram account. On 22 October 2021, Dunn announced her decision to open an OnlyFans account to share her "sexier, racier" content. She explained that as a model, she was constantly compared to other women and her photos were edited to change her appearance without her consent; she opened the OnlyFans account to take control of her image. She added: "I feel sexy and strong and confident when I shoot images like this. I hope I give other women the confidence to own it, to work hard on themselves, to eat well and healthily and to move their bodies in whatever way makes them feel most alive and energised, to wear whatever they like without judgement and to feel proud to be a woman." Dunn's fans and Hollyoaks viewers supported her decision, while a spokesperson for Hollyoaks confirmed that the production team would be meeting with Dunn to discuss the account.

On 3 November 2021, after her meeting with production, it was reported that Dunn had been "axed" from Hollyoaks. The reason given was that Dunn being active on OnlyFans was "not in line with its target audience"; the production team felt that they have a responsibility to younger viewers and stated that "the show does not allow any Hollyoaks cast members to be active on certain 18+ websites". In their statement, the team confirmed that they wanted Dunn to take down her OnlyFans account to continue portraying Mandy, but due to her decision to continue posting on the website, they made the decision to write Mandy out of the soap. Viewers criticised the decision to axe Dunn and her character and stated that the soap are hypocritical due to formerly producing calendars showcasing the cast in similar photographs to Dunn's OnlyFans content. Fans stated that they would boycott the soap and started a petition to reinstate her job. Dunn thanked fans for the support and later voiced her disappointment in her sacking. In an interview, she said that she would miss the cast and crew members and that she expected more from the production team, particularly due to her years of experience on the programme.

== Reception ==
Dunn has been nominated for several awards for her portrayal of Mandy. At the 2002 British Soap Awards, Dunn was nominated for the "Best Actress" and "Sexiest Female" awards. In 2006, she was again nominated for the "Best Actress" and "Sexiest Female" awards. At the 2007 awards, Dunn was nominated for "Best Exit". She was nominated for "Best Actress" at the 2004 Inside Soap Awards. The character was selected as one of the "top 100 British soap characters" by industry experts for a poll to be run by What's on TV in a feature titled "Who is Soap's greatest Legend?", with readers able to vote for their favourite character.

The BBC included Mandy's storyline featuring abuse at the hand of her father in the article about controversial issue led storylines tackled in soap opera and branded the plot as "harrowing". Virgin Media profiled some of Hollyoaks' "hottest females" in their opinion, of Mandy they stated: "Hollyoaks veteran Mandy Richardson has been strutting her stuff on the Chester cobbles for years. She's always avoided the chop but that might all change now she's dragged Warren back. You know what they say, if looks could kill". Emma Johnson of the Liverpool Daily Post said, of Mandy, "she was sexually abused by her father and held hostage by her psychotic best friend, she lost half her family in tragic circumstances and her baby in a cot death, so you could forgive Hollyoaks's Mandy Richardson if she sometimes wished a superhero would come and whisk her away". In response to Gordon and Helen being killed off a car crash plot, Sam Soap from Inside Soap thought it was "great" and wished that producers had also killed off the entire Cunningham family because of their "grumpy faces". His colleague Lucy Lather disagreed, adding Hollyoaks "wouldn't be the same without Mandy and Max." Another Inside Soap reporter included Mandy in a list of "top five Hollyoaks blonde" characters. They stated that "she's had more men than hot dinners, but still looks gorgeous."
