= Eve White =

English television actress

Eve White was an English television actress. Among other roles, she appeared as Sue Morgan on the soap opera Hollyoaks from 1999 to 2002.

White is now a literary agent in London, UK, having founded Eve White Literary Agency in 2003.
