= Sarah Jayne Dunn =

English actress (born 1981)

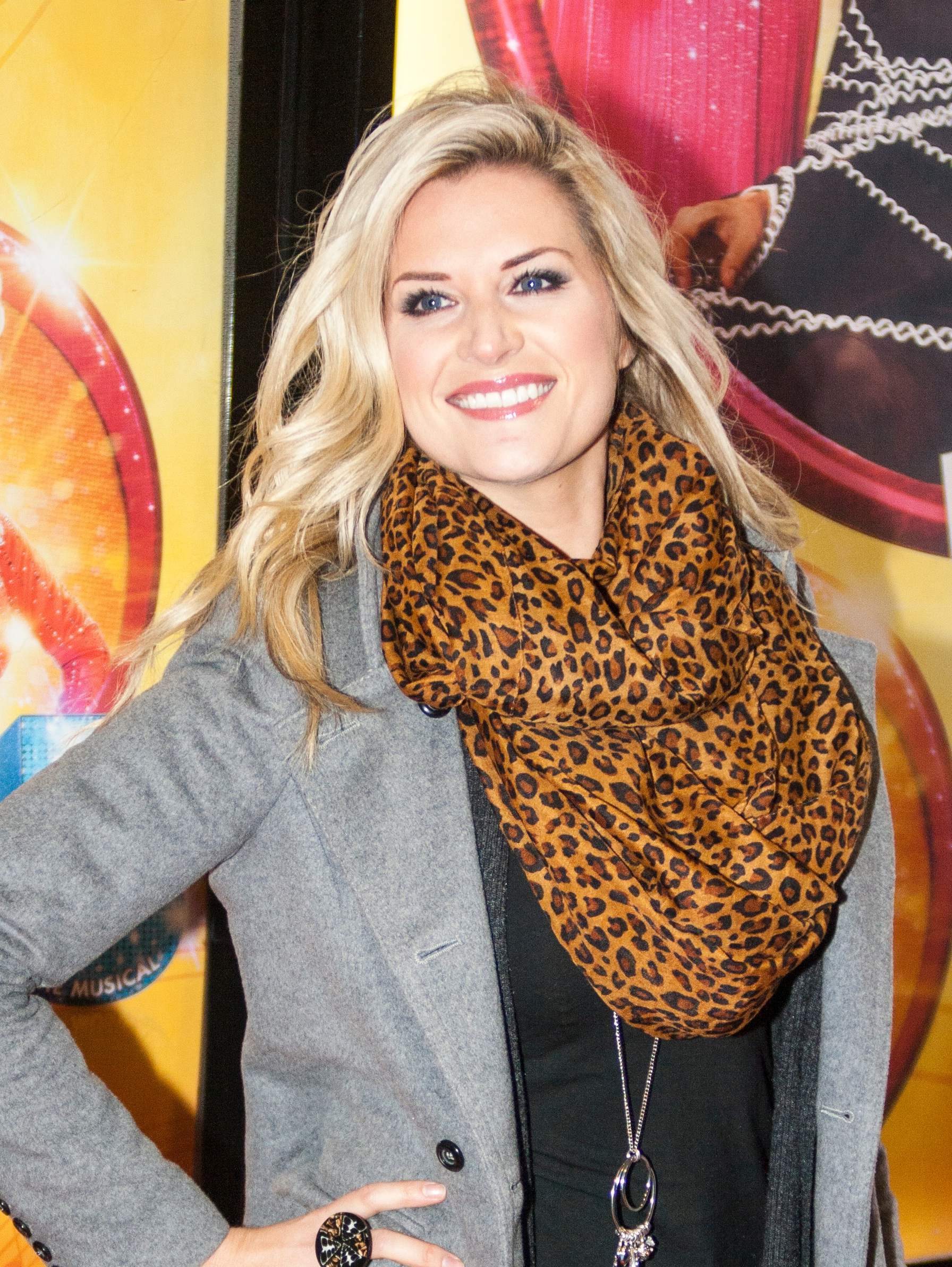
- Dunn in 2012
- Born: 25 September 1981 (age 45); Leigh, Greater Manchester, England
- Occupation: Actress
- Years active: 1996–present
- Spouse: Jonathan Smith (m. 2018)
- Children: 1

Sarah Jayne Dunn (born 25 September 1981) is an English actress, known for playing Mandy Richardson on the Channel 4 soap opera Hollyoaks from 1996 until 2021. In November 2021, Dunn was dropped from Hollyoaks after she joined the adult subscription service OnlyFans.

== Career ==
=== Hollyoaks ===
Dunn first appeared on the Channel 4 soap opera Hollyoaks on 12 September 1996, walking into the video shop in the forty-third episode. Mandy came into the village at the age of 14 as a "wannabe supermodel" and quickly formed a friendship with Ollie Benson. In 2003, Dunn played a supporting role in the Brookside DVD spin-off, Unfinished Business. In 2004 Dunn appeared in the fitness DVD Hollyoaks Dance workout with Ali Bastian (Becca Dean) and Jodi Albert (Debbie Dean). Dunn left Hollyoaks as a cast regular in 2006.

Dunn has since returned to Hollyoaks five times. In February 2007 for a two episode stint for the funeral of Mandy's best friend, Becca. She returned in 2008 for six months, leaving in December after the disastrous wedding of Warren Fox (Jamie Lomas) and Louise Summers (Roxanne McKee). In November 2010 Dunn returned to Hollyoaks with a one-year contract alongside Lomas, leaving in September 2011. Dunn reprised her role as Mandy for a guest stint in the spin-off Hollyoaks Later in October 2013. On 2 June 2017, it was announced that Dunn would reprise her role as Mandy alongside Gary Lucy, who plays Luke Morgan, in the main show.

Throughout her career, Dunn has been pictured wearing lingerie for glamour photography which she has shared on her Instagram account. On 22 October 2021, Dunn announced her decision to open an OnlyFans account to share her "sexier, racier" content. She explained that as a model, she was constantly compared to other women and her photos were edited to change her appearance without her consent; she opened the OnlyFans account to take control of her image. She added: "I feel sexy and strong and confident when I shoot images like this. I hope I give other women the confidence to own it, to work hard on themselves, to eat well and healthily and to move their bodies in whatever way makes them feel most alive and energised, to wear whatever they like without judgement and to feel proud to be a woman." Dunn's fans and Hollyoaks viewers supported her decision, while a spokesperson for Hollyoaks confirmed that the production team would be meeting with Dunn to discuss the account.

On 3 November 2021, after her meeting with production, it was reported that Dunn had been "axed" from Hollyoaks. The reason given was that Dunn being active on OnlyFans was "not in line with its target audience"; the production team felt that they have a responsibility to younger viewers and stated that "the show does not allow any Hollyoaks cast members to be active on certain 18+ websites". In their statement, the team confirmed that they wanted Dunn to take down her OnlyFans account to continue playing Mandy, but due to her decision to continue posting on the website, they made the decision to write Mandy out of the soap. Viewers criticised the decision to axe Dunn and her character and stated that the soap are hypocritical due to formerly producing calendars showcasing the cast in similar photographs to Dunn's OnlyFans content. Fans stated that they would boycott the soap and started a petition to reinstate her job. Dunn thanked fans for the support and later voiced her disappointment in her sacking. In an interview, she said that she would miss the cast and crew members and that she expected more from the production team, particularly due to her years of experience on the programme. She also said the one good thing was that the way it ended she could never go back and told the Tis Yourself podcast: "I feel like I was able to shed that version of me and I was also able to be free."

=== Television ===
In 2007 Dunn appeared in single episodes of the BBC One series The Innocence Project, the BBC Three series Drop Dead Gorgeous and It's Adam and Shelley. She has also appeared in nine episodes of BBC One's medical soap opera Doctors. She has also appeared in an episode of Big Brother's Little Brother. In January 2010 Dunn appeared with Helen Noble on Ready Steady Cook. In January 2011 Dunn appeared in the former reality show Famous and Fearless on Channel 4. In May 2011 Dunn appeared in two episodes of the three partl BBC One series Exile. In October 2011 Dunn appeared in an episode of the BBC One reality series The Real Hustle. In 2014/15 she played international charity worker Taylor Ashbie in the BBC One medical drama Casualty (Series 29, episodes 13 to 29), who became the girlfriend of cast regular Caleb Knight (Richard Winsor). She left after it was revealed that the charity was actually a con-trick, and that she had knowingly conned Knight. She returned to the production in late 2015.

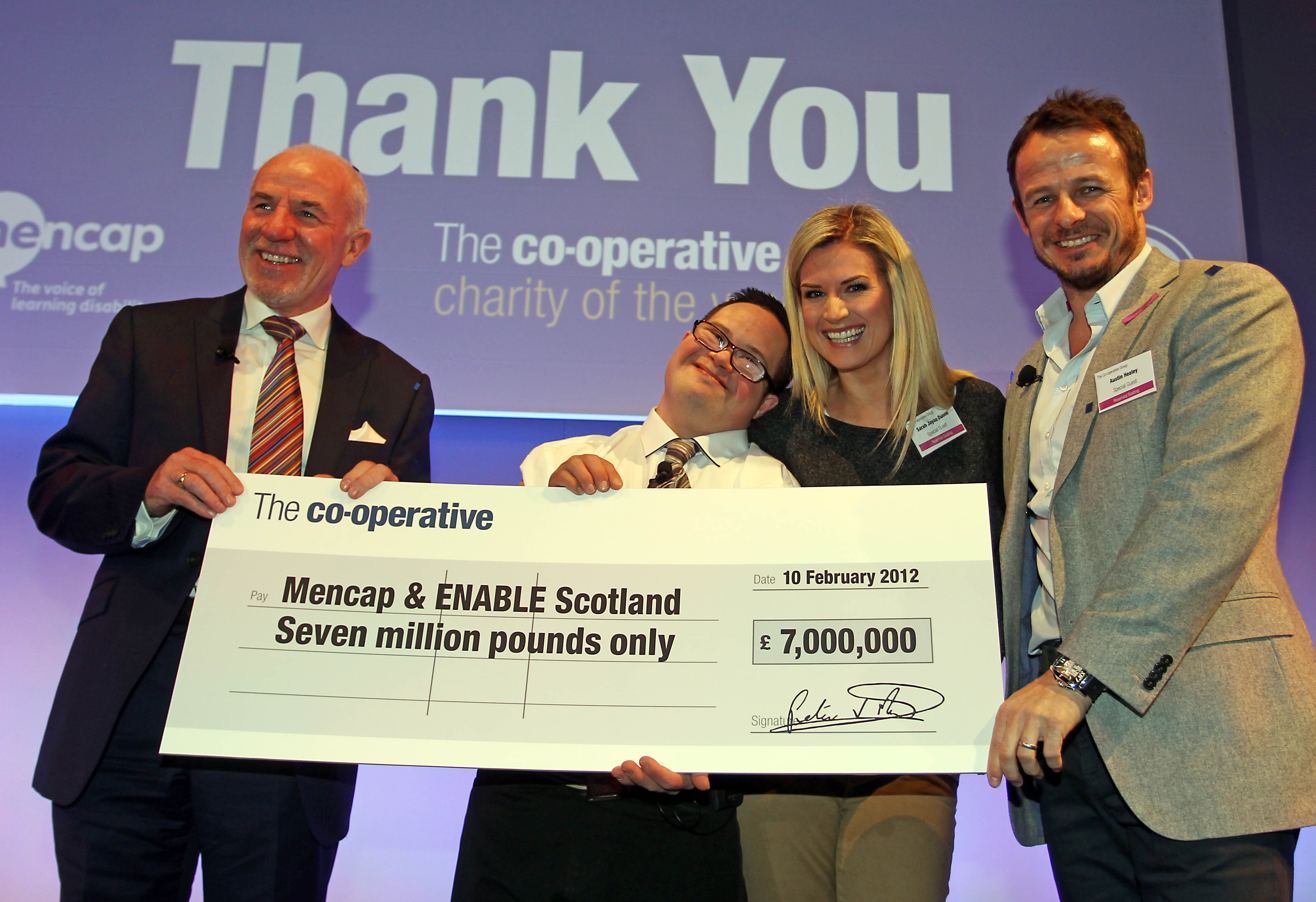
Dunn accepting a cheque for Mencap

=== Film ===
In 2007 Dunn had lead roles in the short films Northern Cowboys and Betting in Bars. Dunn had a brief role in the 2008 film, The Dark Knight. In 2011 she played a character called Victoria in a film called Death.

=== Theatre ===
Dunn played Gloria in a UK regional tour of the comedy play Boeing-Boeing. The tour started at the Liverpool Playhouse on 18 December 2008 and finished at the Birmingham Rep on 25 April 2009. Dunn appeared in a tour of The Vagina Monologues which began on 7 September 2009 at the Churchill Theatre, Bromley and ended on 8 December 2009 at the Jersey Opera House. In 2010 Dunn played Sally in the UK regional theatre tour of When Harry Met Sally... which started on 3 February at the Theatre Royal, Wakefield, and ended on 26 June at the Sheffield Lyceum Theatre. When Harry met Sally then played at the Grand Canal Theatre in Dublin, Ireland for one week ending on 3 July 2010.

=== Theatre school ===
In September 2007, it was announced that, along with her former Hollyoaks colleague Helen Noble and theatre actor Graham Tudor, she would be teaching students at a new acting school in Liverpool.

== Personal life ==
Sarah has a son.

== Awards and nominations ==
=== 2002 ===
- Winner at British Soap Awards in category of 'Most Spectacular Scene of the Year' for Adam and Mandy's car crash, shared with David Brown (Adam Morgan)

=== 2006 ===
- Nominated at British Soap Awards in category of 'Sexiest Female' for her role in Hollyoaks

=== 2007 ===
- Nominated at British Soap Awards in category of 'Best Exit' for her role in Hollyoaks
