= Wendy Glenn =

English actress and model

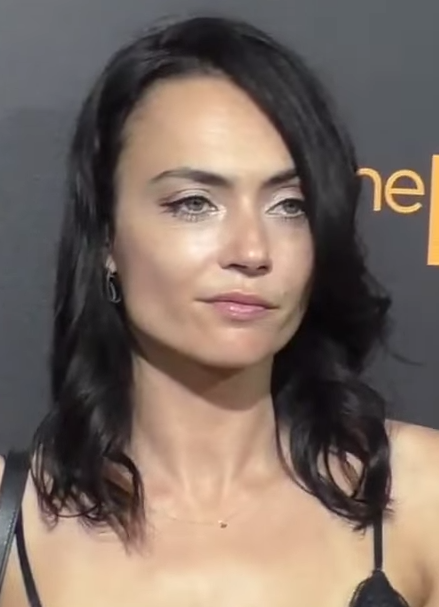
- Glenn in 2016
- Born: Wendy Glenn; August 4, 1985 (age 41); Bristol, England
- Occupations: Actress; model
- Height: 5 ft 7 in (1.70 m)
- Relatives: Sammy Glenn (sister)

Wendy Glenn is an English actress and model.

== Early life and education ==
Glenn attended the Sylvia Young Theatre School in London. Her sister Sammy Glenn is also an actress.

== Career ==
Glenn began her career as a child model. Between that and Sylvia Young, Glenn landed several national commercials and a guest star role on London's Burning. She presented The Disney Club, but left to play the lead in the British series Sister Said, in which she starred for three years.

After Sister Said, Glenn landed the role of Nikki Sullivan in Hollyoaks. She has appeared on the cover of Maxim and FHM, was a special guest star on Nip/Tuck, CSI: Miami, Without a Trace and CSI: Crime Scene Investigation, and portrayed the title role in the film Mercy.

== Filmography ==
=== Film ===
Year	Title	Role	Notes
2009	Mercy	Mercy	
2010	Waking Madison	Angel	
2010	Champion	Sarah	Short
2011	You're Next	Zee	
2011	11-11-11	Sadie	
2012	And If Tomorrow...	Madeline	Short
2014	500 Miles North	Sassy	
2015	Clash of the Dead	Emma	
2017	Genesis	Samantha McDonald	

=== Television ===
Year	Title	Role	Notes
1994–95	The Disney Club	'Sam' - co-host	TV series
1996	Der Blinde		TV film
1998	Sister Said	Wendy	TV series
1999–00	Hollyoaks	Nikki Sullivan	TV series
2000	Hollyoaks: Breaking Boundaries	Nikki Sullivan	TV film
2004	Dead Like Me	Kyle's Girlfriend	"Rites of Passage"
2005–06	Reunion	Pascale	Recurring role
2008	Murder 101: New Age	Jasmine Celestine	TV film
2008	The Governor's Wife	Mandy Paulson	TV film
2008	The L Word	Isabella / Bev	Guest role (4 episodes)
2008	Without a Trace	Sara Kent	"22 x 42"
2008	CSI: Miami	Christina Dodd	"Cheating Death"
2009	CSI: Crime Scene Investigation	Darcy Farrell	"Kill Me If You Can"
2009	Nip/Tuck	Giselle Blaylock	"Giselle Blaylock & Legend Chandler"
2009	Melrose Place	Melissa Saks	"Cahuenga"
2010	Night and Day	Skye	TV film
2010	Human Target	Susan Connors	"The Return of Baptiste"
2011	The Trivial Pursuits of Arthur Banks	Annette	TV series
2014	Crystal Skulls	Sienna	TV film
2014	Angelus	Sadie	TV film
2018	Jesus: His Life	Herodias	TV series
