= Ali Bastian =

English actress

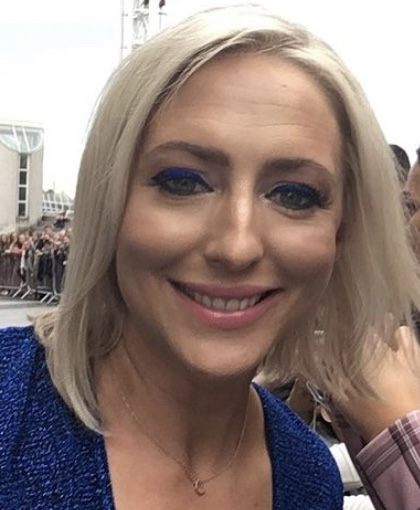
- Bastian in 2019
- Born: Alexandra Louise Bastian; 27 February 1982 (age 44); Windsor, Berkshire, England
- Occupation: Actress
- Years active: 1992–present
- Spouse: David O'Mahony (m. 2019)
- Children: 2

Alexandra Louise Bastian (born 27 February 1982) is an English actress, known for her roles as Becca Dean in the Channel 4 soap opera Hollyoaks, Sally Armstrong in the ITV drama series The Bill and Becky Clarke in the BBC soap opera Doctors. She has also competed in the seventh series of Strictly Come Dancing.

== Career ==
Bastian was signed to Storm Models, and has worked for Littlewoods within a new range called Drama Queens. Bastian joined the Channel 4 soap opera Hollyoaks in 2001 as Becca Hayton. She was involved in a controversial storyline where her character was fired from her teaching job and sent to prison after having an affair with one of her students Justin Burton, who was portrayed by Chris Fountain. In December 2005, alongside her Hollyoaks castmates Jodi Albert (Debbie Dean) and Sarah Jayne Dunn (Mandy Richardson), she appeared in an exercise video, Hollyoaks Get Fit. At the 2006 British Soap Awards, Bastian and Fountain won the award for "Best Storyline". She departed from the series in 2007. Bastian then appeared on television in Cavegirl, A Touch of Frost, Twenty Four 7, and Here After.

Bastian joined the long-running ITV police drama The Bill as PC Sally Armstrong in 2007, and departed in late 2009. In 2009, Bastian was a contestant on the seventh series of Strictly Come Dancing, departing in the semi-final, where she was partnered with Brian Fortuna. In week 11, she severely bruised the bones of her foot while training, but the medical team gave her the all clear to go ahead and perform. Bastian and Fortuna finished in third place out of sixteen couples. The pair danced again in the Strictly Come Dancing Christmas Special in 2009 and won, having scored 40/40 for their Viennese waltz.

In 2011, Bastian starred in the UK touring version of Bill Kenwright's production of Verdict by Agatha Christie, playing alter-ego Helen Rollander. In late 2018, it was announced that Bastian had joined the cast of the BBC daytime soap opera Doctors as Becky Clarke. Her first episode as Becky aired on 5 February 2019. Bastian made an unannounced departure from Doctors in the episode broadcast on 6 November 2019 and confirmed after the episode had aired that she had left the show.

== Personal life ==
Bastian dated her Strictly co-star Brian Fortuna. Bastian became engaged to musician Tom Clay in 2013. In February 2019, she married actor and producer for Big Finish Productions, David O'Mahony. In October 2019, she announced she was pregnant with their first child, and as a result, left the cast of Doctors. Bastian explained that she had made the decision to leave Doctors to reduce her workload so that she could concentrate on getting pregnant in real life. She felt that her body "was crying out for a break" and said that her exit had helped her to conceive a baby. On 17 March 2020, she announced the birth of their first daughter. On 11 February 2023, it was announced that Bastian and O'Mahony had welcomed a second daughter. In September 2024, Bastian announced that she had been diagnosed with stage II breast cancer. In March 2025, she announced that she was cancer free following a mastectomy, chemotherapy and radiotherapy.

== Filmography ==
Year	Title	Role	Notes
1992	Jane Eyre	Young Jane	
1997	FairyTale: A True Story	Lull (Fairy)	Film
1998	Next Birthday	Monica	Short film
1999	A Touch of Frost	Lisa Harper	Episode: "Line of Fire: Part 1"
2001–2007	Hollyoaks	Becca Dean	Series regular
2001	Shades	Lucy	1 episode
2002	Come Together	Tara	Television film
2007–2009	The Bill	PC Sally Armstrong	Series regular
2009	Strictly Come Dancing	Herself	Contestant; third place
2012	Sadie J	Tru	Episode : "Bridesmaidamundo"
2012	Strippers vs Werewolves	Dani	Film
2014	Jonathan Creek	Juno Pirelli	Episode : "The Letters Of Septimus Noone"
2014	Doctors	Kara Meredith	Episode : "Baby Chain"
2015	Death in Paradise	Jenny Burgess	Episode : "Until Death Do You Part"
2016	Undercover Hooligan	DC Baker	Film
2016	Doctors	Julianna Isaac	Episode: "Living Together"
2017	You Can Tutu	Kat	Film
2017	Who Is Alice	Alice / Nina	Film
2017	Holby City	Chevonne Lumionne	2 episodes
2018	Hooligan Escape: The Russian Job	Veronika	Film
2019	Eve	Suzy	Film
2019	Doctors	Becky Clarke	Series regular

== Stage ==
Year	Title	Venue	Ref.
2010	Burn the Floor	Shaftesbury Theatre	
2011	Verdict	UK tour	
2012	Chicago	UK tour	
2013	Breathless	Soho Theatre	

== Awards and nominations ==
Year	Award	Category	Result	Ref.
2003	British Soap Awards	Sexiest Female	Nominated	
2003	Inside Soap Awards	Sexiest Female	Nominated	
2005	Inside Soap Awards	Best Actress	Nominated	
2006	British Soap Awards	Sexiest Female	Nominated	
2006	British Soap Awards	Best Actress	Nominated	
2006	Inside Soap Awards	Sexiest Female	Nominated	
2006	Inside Soap Awards	Best Actress	Nominated	
2011	WhatsOnStage Awards	Best New Talent	Nominated	
2017	International Film Festival Los Angeles	Best Performance of Festival	Won	
2017	International Film Festival Los Angeles	Best Ensemble	Won	
2017	Actors Awards, Los Angeles	Best Actress	Won	
2017	Actors Awards, Los Angeles	Best Ensemble	Won	
2017	New York Film Awards	Best Actress	Won	
2017	Hollywood International Moving Picture Film Festival	Best Actress	Won	
2019	British Soap Awards	Best Actress	Longlisted	
