= Gary Lucy =

English actor and model (born 1981)

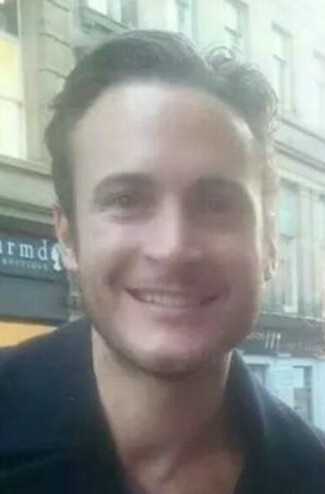
- Gary Lucy outside Theatre Royal, Newcastle, October 2014
- Born: 27 November 1981 (age 43); Chigwell, Essex, England
- Occupation(s): Actor, television personality and model
- Years active: 1996–present
- Television: Dream Team (1997–1998); Hollyoaks (1999–2002, 2017–2022); Footballers' Wives (2002–2004); The Bill (2005–2010); Dancing on Ice (2010, 2014); EastEnders (2012–2014)
- Spouse: Natasha Gray (m. 2014; sep. 2018)
- Children: 5
- Website: Official website

Gary Edward Lucy (born 27 November 1981) is an English actor, television personality and model who is best known for playing Will Fletcher in the ITV police drama The Bill, Luke Morgan in Hollyoaks, Kyle Pascoe in Footballers' Wives and Danny Pennant in the BBC soap opera EastEnders. He also played a part in the show The Dumping Ground as a footballer named Billy.

== Career ==
Lucy was born in Chigwell, Essex. He appeared in Grange Hill and Dream Team before getting the role that brought him to public attention, Luke Morgan in the Channel 4 soap opera Hollyoaks. Lucy undertook a male rape storyline, for which he won the Best Newcomer award at the 2000 British Soap Awards. Lucy then went on to do three series of the ITV football drama Footballers' Wives where he played Kyle Pascoe, a football player for fictional football club Earl's Park. In 2004, Lucy starred as Michael Sands with Ray Winstone in the ITV drama She's Gone. From 2005 to 2010, he portrayed P/DC Will Fletcher in the ITV police drama The Bill and appeared in Sky1 show The Match. In 2009, he took part and appeared in the drama film, Whatever It Takes. That same year, he departed from The Bill to "explore other projects". Lucy took part in the fifth series of the ITV talent show Dancing on Ice, paired with series regular skater Maria Fillipov. On 28 March 2010, Lucy finished as runner-up. On 29 November 2010, he appeared as Ben Lloyd in an episode of the BBC One drama Missing.

On 27 September 2012, Lucy made his first screen appearance as Danny Pennant in the BBC soap opera EastEnders. On 6 March 2013, it was announced that Lucy would be returning to EastEnders as a permanent cast member.

In early 2014, Lucy appeared again as a contestant in the 'All-Stars Series' of Dancing on Ice. He was paired with series regular and skater Katie Stainsby.

In September 2014, Lucy began playing the lead role of Gaz in the touring production of The Full Monty.

In July 2014, it was announced that Lucy would appear in one episode of BBC medical drama Casualty as patient Val Kildare. He was described as "a loveable rogue, born charmer and conman who exists very much on the wrong side of the tracks". He appeared on 15 November 2014. He also played a part in the CBBC show The Dumping Ground as a footballer named Billy who was the fantasised father of character Finn.

In 2017, Lucy returned to Hollyoaks. He took a break from the series in 2018 to appear in a play. The character made a few brief appearances throughout 2019 before he returned permanently in August of that year.

== Personal life ==
Lucy attended Trinity Catholic High School in Woodford Green, Essex. He had his own company, Gary Lucy Real Estate, however this was dissolved in 2014.

Lucy married Natasha Gray on 16 November 2014 and was covered and featured with a magazine deal with OK!. They have two daughters and two sons.

In November 2018, it was announced that Lucy and Gray had separated.

After appearing on the Channel 4 dating show Celebs Go Dating, Lucy began a relationship with former Love Island contestant, Laura Anderson. In February 2023, Anderson announced that she was pregnant by Lucy, while at the same time announcing the couple's separation.

== Filmography ==
Year	Title	Role	Notes
1997	Grange Hill		1 episode
1997–1998	Dream Team	Gary Roscoe	Series regular; Sky One
1999–2002, 2017–2023	Hollyoaks	Luke Morgan	Regular role
2000	Hollyoaks: Breaking Boundaries	Luke Morgan	Hollyoaks spin-off
2001	Hollyoaks: Indecent Behaviour	Luke Morgan	Hollyoaks spin-off
2002	The Big Breakfast	Himself	Guest, 1 episode
2002	The Saturday Show	Himself	Guest, 2 episodes
2002–2004	Footballers' Wives	Kyle Pascoe	Series regular, 25 episodes
2002, 2004	GMTV with Lorraine	Himself	Guest, 2 episodes
2004	She's Gone	Michael Sands	Drama; main cast
2004	Today with Des and Mel	Himself	Guest, 1 episode
2004, 2006, 2007	Richard & Judy	Himself	Guest, 3 episodes
2005–2010	The Bill	PC/DC Will Fletcher	Series regular, 167 episodes
2005	The New Paul O'Grady Show	Himself	Guest, 1 episode
2008	All Star Family Fortunes	Himself	1 episode
2009	Whatever It Takes	Matthew Cassady	Film role; main cast
2009	All Star Mr & Mrs	Himself	1 episode
2009	Who Wants to Be a Millionaire?	Himself	Celebrity special; 1 episode
2010	Xposé	Himself	Guest, 1 episode
2010	Missing	Ben Lloyd	Episode #2.1
2010, 2012	Loose Women	Himself	Guest, 3 episodes
2010	Dancing on Ice	Himself	Contestant & participant; runner-up; second place
2012–2014	EastEnders	Danny Pennant	Regular role; 56 episodes
2013	Big Brother's Bit On The Side	Himself	1 episode
2013, 2014	This Morning	Himself	Guest, 2 episodes
2014	Dancing on Ice	Himself	All-Stars Series; contestant; eliminated fourth; eleventh place
2014	Casualty	Valentine Kildare	Episode: "Deadfall"
2018	The Dumping Ground	Billy McLaine	Episode: "Heroes"
2020	Hollyoaks Does Come Dine with Me	Himself	Contestant

== Theatre ==
- The Full Monty (musical) – 2014–present, stage adaptation of the film The Full Monty, Theatre Royal, Newcastle

In November 2021, he appeared as a guest star in "The Play What I Wrote", a tribute to Morcambe and Wise, playing himself.
