= Marcus Patric =

English actor (born 1979)

Marcus Patrick
- Born: 17 August 1979 (age 46); Gosport, Hampshire, England
- Other name: Marcus Patrick
- Education: Bembridge, Isle of Wight, England
- Years active: 2000–present
- Partner: Georgia Martin
- Children: 2

Marcus Patrick (born on 17 August 1979) is an English actor.

== Career ==
Best known for the role of Ben Davies in the Channel 4 soap opera Hollyoaks, he then starred in its spin-offs Hollyoaks: Let Loose and Hollyoaks: In the City. He won the role after entering the televised open-audition Hollyoaks: On The Pull.

After leaving Hollyoaks in 2006, Patrick has appeared twice on BBC1 lunchtime drama Doctors, and in 2008 he landed a major role in ITV1 drama Echo Beach and its spin-off show Moving Wallpaper.

=== Gameshows ===
Marcus has also appeared as a competitor on The Weakest Link, Soapstar Superchef, Strictly Ice Dancing and Celebrity MasterChef. He also won Total Wipeout and 71 Degrees North.

== Personal life ==
Patrick's father died when he was seven years of age. Patrick lives with his partner, Georgia Martin, an air hostess, and their son, Ethan (who was born on the anniversary of Patrick's father's death). Marcus is currently an opening batsman for Verwood Cricket Club 3rd XI in the Dorset Cricket League.

== Filmography ==
Year	Title	Role	Notes
2000–2005	Hollyoaks	Ben Davies	
2001	Hollyoaks: Indecent Behaviour	Ben Davies	
2005	Hollyoaks: Let Loose	Ben Davies	
2006	Hollyoaks: In the City	Ben Davies	
2007	Doctors	Robert Penrose	Episode: "To Have and to Hold
2008	Echo Beach	Ian Brenton	11 episodes; credited as Marcus Patrick
2011	We Need To Talk About Keiran	Ed	
2012	Doctors	Joel Morrissey	
2012	Crime Stories	Jeremy West	Credited as Marcus Patrick

== Theatre ==
- 2011, 2012 Wildboyz
- 2012 Billy Liar
- 2015 Snow White
- 2016 Jack and the beanstalk, Kings Theatre Portsmouth.
- 2017 Snow White, Kings Theatre Portsmouth
