= Hollyoaks Later series 6 =

British television series (2013)

Hollyoaks Later
- Series 6
- No. of episodes: 5

Release
- Original network: E4
- Original release: 7 October – 11 October 2013

Series chronology
- ← Previous; Series 5 Next → 2020 Special

The sixth series of Hollyoaks Later is a British television series and late night spin-off of Channel 4 soap opera Hollyoaks. The series consists of five episodes, which aired from 7 October to 11 October 2013, on E4. The series transmitted to concur with the main show's eighteenth anniversary and acted as "a celebration of Hollyoaks past and present". These celebrations included several former cast members returning for the series as part of original character Tony Hutchinson's (Nick Pickard) storyline. These returns included Jeremy Edwards (Kurt Benson), James Redmond (Rory "Finn" Finnigan), John Pickard (Dom Reilly) and Sarah Jayne Dunn (Mandy Richardson).

Another storyline saw Esther Bloom (Jazmine Franks) and her friends celebrate her eighteenth birthday in a "spooky" location. The introduction of Jade Hedy (Lucy Gape) was revealed to leave these characters in danger, with two of the characters involved set to die during the series. When the episodes aired Callum Kane (Laurie Duncan) died in "surprising and shocking" scenes as he was stabbed through the chest with a samurai sword by Jade, who would go on to die herself. The third storyline for the series revolved around Theresa McQueen (Jorgie Porter) as she embarked on a "wild road trip" with her cousin, Louis McQueen (Bryan Parry).

== Development ==
On 12 June 2013, it was officially announced that Hollyoaks Later would return for a sixth series consisting of five one-hour episodes, confirmed to air from 7 October to 11 October. Jane Steventon produced the series while Hollyoaks' executive producer Bryan Kirkwood took on the role of executive producer for the series. On the recommissioning of the series, Lee Mason, Channel 4's editor drama commissioning said: "We're thrilled to be bringing back Hollyoaks Later for a sixth series and with it some of our best loved Hollyoaks faces. Tony's cancer battle is an important story for us to tell and we're so excited to be able to explore it further within the high octane, highly emotional and sometimes shocking world of Hollyoaks Later". Kirkwood explained that Hollyoaks Later would transmit around the main show's eighteenth anniversary and would "be a celebration of Hollyoaks past and present".

It was announced that several former cast members of Hollyoaks would return, including original cast member Jeremy Edwards who played Kurt Benson, James Redmond who played Rory "Finn" Finnigan and John Pickard who played Dom Reilly. The returning cast members were announced to feature alongside Tony Hutchinson (Nick Pickard) for "an epic ride of Hangover-style proportions". Sarah Jayne Dunn, who played Mandy Richardson confirmed she would return to her longstanding role during the spin-offs series. Parry Glasspool was cast in the role of Tony's estranged son, Harry Thompson, who had previously appeared in Hollyoaks between 2007–2008 and 2009, then played by Daniel Seymour and later Harrison George Rhodes. Danny Dyer was confirmed to play The White Man, who is an "unrelenting adversary" for Tony and his friends, while Greg Wood was cast in the series as his Hollyoaks character Trevor Royle. It was also confirmed that Kurt, who was originally killed off in 1999 would appear as a "guardian angel-type figure" for Tony as he continues to struggle with his cancer battle. Kirkwood explained these returns would facilitate Tony's "rites of passage story as he looks into his uncertain future". Filming took place during July, on location in Málaga, Spain and Morocco for scenes set in Spain and Morocco.

Esther Bloom (Jazmine Franks) and Tilly Evans (Lucy Dixon) also appear in a storyline that sees them celebrate Esther's eighteenth birthday in a "spooky" location. Producer Kirkwood explained that Esther and Tilly, joined by Holly Cunningham (Wallis Day) and Callum Kane (Laurie Duncan) would become involved in "a rip-roaring plot as they all find danger in a cabin in the woods". He continued to explain that Esther and Tilly's relationship would go in a "very unexpected direction" during the series. Lucy Gape, who was cast to appear as Jade Hedy in Hollyoaks confirmed that she would appear in the series and the character was teased to potentially come between Esther and Tilly. Actor Jordan Dawes was also cast in the series, appearing as villain Wes Anderson who puts Holly through a traumatic time "by forcing her to follow his perverted instructions".

Franks said viewers would see a completely different side of her character during the series, explaining that the series shows Esther growing up as she turns eighteen. She continued to say that Esther would have a hard time but shows that she is a "tough cookie" during the episodes. On filming racier scenes for the late night show, the actress said she felt "petrified" and was nervous but that filming the scenes in one day made them easier to do. Franks said that Jade is shown to be a "weirdo" as her sinister side is revealed, explaining that Jade is "a bit mental". The later air time allowed the scenes to be pushed further and the episodes did not have to hide anything due to their darker nature which would lead them to become "pretty gruesome".

It was revealed that Jade's sinister side would leave the characters in serious danger and that not all the characters involved in the teen storyline would survive the series. It was later revealed that two characters from the main show would die during the series. When episode four was transmitted viewers saw Callum try to rescue Esther from Jade who had taken her hostage after becoming fixated on Esther because of her liver transplant from Jade's dead boyfriend. While rescuing Esther, Callum was stabbed by Jade with a samurai sword which killed him. Callum's exit was not announced previous to its airing, shocking viewers. Duncan felt that the scenes are "surprising and shocking" as they lead the viewer to believe that Callum has saved Esther until he is suddenly killed. Gape said she felt bad that Jade was responsible for Callum's death, although she praised the means of his murder, calling it "one of the best Hollyoaks' deaths yet". Although the scenes were filmed using a real samurai sword, the props department created a reproduction of the sword which was used by Duncan during his death scene. The sword was attached to Duncan using a harness to give the appearance that he had been impaled with the blade exiting his chest, with the puncture wound created using makeup. Jade was the second Hollyoaks' character to die during Later, being killed by falling on her own knife during a fight with Tilly.

It was revealed that Theresa McQueen (Jorgie Porter) who had previously appeared in four series of Hollyoaks Later would appear in a storyline that sees her "join up with a new recruit of the McQueen clan on a wild road trip". Bryan Parry was cast as Theresa's cousin, Louis McQueen who is in training for the army. Theresa visits Louis, hoping to find a boyfriend amongst Louis' army friends although she resultingly gets Louis into trouble. It was announced that Dean Aspen would return as his Hollyoaks' character Duncan Button during the series, appearing as Louis' army friend. Also featuring in the storyline are Captain Harvey Smith played by Dominic Tighe and Corporal Taylor Wells played by Abigail Hardingham.

== Promotion ==
On 23 September a trailer for Hollyoaks' autumn period was released which included scenes from the sixth series of Hollyoaks Later. An official trailer exclusively for the series later began airing on E4. A promotional trailer was released on 1 October 2013, featuring scenes that did not feature in the series but were instead shot only for the series. The feature shows Tony, Finn, Dom and Kurt playing a game of cards before The White Man enters the room. Nick Pickard, Edwards and Redmond appeared on Daybreak to promote the series while Porter appeared on BBC Radio 1 as promotion.

== Plot ==
Tony Hutchinson (Nick Pickard) continues to battle testicular cancer while in Spain for his brother Dominic Reilly's (John Pickard) wedding alongside old friend Rory "Finn" Finnigan (James Redmond) and son Harry Thompson (Parry Glasspool). Tony comes up against gangster The White Man (Danny Dyer) while he begins seeing visions of his dead friend Kurt Benson (Jeremy Edwards). To celebrate her eighteenth birthday Esther Bloom (Jazmine Franks) and her girlfriend Tilly Evans (Lucy Dixon), along with friends Holly Cunningham (Wallis Day) and Callum Kane (Laurie Duncan) travel to an isolated house owned by Jade Hedy's (Lucy Gape). Jade's sinister side is revealed, placing the group in danger. Theresa McQueen (Jorgie Porter) visits cousin Louis McQueen (Bryan Parry) who is in the army, leading to a road trip which causes trouble for Louis.

== Cast ==
Character	Actor	Reference
Tony Hutchinson	Nick Pickard	
Kurt Benson	Jeremy Edwards	
Rory "Finn" Finnigan	James Redmond	
Dominic Reilly	John Pickard	
Mandy Richardson	Sarah Jayne Dunn	
Harry Thompson	Parry Glasspool	
Diane O'Connor	Alex Fletcher	
Trevor Royle	Greg Wood	
The White Man	Danny Dyer	
Carlotta Diez	Stella Pecollo	
Maria Gonzalez	Thaila Zucchi	
Harriet Gonzalez	Harriet Cains	
Esther Bloom	Jazmine Franks	
Tilly Evans	Lucy Dixon	
Holly Cunningham	Wallis Day	
Callum Kane	Laurie Duncan	
Jade Hedy	Lucy Gape	
Wes Anderson	Ryan Barr	
Theresa McQueen	Jorgie Porter	
Louis McQueen	Bryan Parry	
Duncan Button	Dean Aspen	
Captain Harvey Smith	Dominic Tighe	
Corporal Taylor Wells	Abigail Hardingham	

== Reception ==
The first episode was watched by 396,000 viewers (a 2.4% audience share) and by 138,000 (1.7%) an hour later on E4+1. The second episode was watched by 382,000 viewers (2.4%) on E4 and by 106,000 (1.3%) on E4+1. 323,000 Viewers (2.0%) watched the third episode on E4 on Wednesday and by 112,000 (1.4%) an hour later. The penultimate episode on Thursday brought in 414,000 viewers (2.6%) at 10pm and 106,000 (1.3%) at 11pm. The final episode was watched by 357,000 viewers (2.1%) on E4 and by 101,000 (0.9%) on E4+1.

Rebecca Bowden of Yahoo! said that scenes featuring Tony, Finn and Dom had them "share some amazing banter reminding us of days gone by". She continued to say that the scenes with Tony, Finn and Dom deciding to go to Spain for Dom's wedding and ignore Tony's scheduled operation had her "wondering if this is this all real or just some crazy cancer induced dream?" The author added that "there is a brilliant scene at customs with Dom trying to translate what the gang are saying and getting it all completely wrong!" Bowden later praised the "banter" between the group, adding that she found one of Dom's scenes "absolutely hilarious". She felt that the storyline was "so ridiculous" that it was difficult to take it seriously although she commended the entertainment value of the scenes. Bowden praised the return of previous cast members during the series, saying it brought back "great nostalgic memories".

Yahoo! author Bowden praised the fourth episode of the series, saying that the episode "seems much less cheesy, well acted and quite chilling in places". She focused this comment on "hard-hitting" scenes featuring Tilly in the cabin and Tony as he follows his dead daughter Grace. Concluding her review, Bowden said she enjoyed the "darker parts" of the episode but felt that the scenes should have featured less of Theresa's storyline which "lacked any kind of pace or interest within reality and total disregard of how the British Army appears or operates within recruitment and training". Reviewing the series' final episode she praised cast members Dyer, saying he is "doing a really great job in these scenes and manages to be the perfect blend of menacing and darkly humorous" and Pickard, saying he "has been excellent right the way through and continues to show that he can do both everyday scenes back in 'Hollyoaks' village as well as the high drama stuff in these late night spin-off shows".

When Callum's exit was transmitted viewers took to social media networking site Twitter to express shock and disappointed at the character's death. Of Callum's departure, Anthony D. Langford of TheBacklot.com said: "I hate that the show killed off Callum. I think they wasted his character and he had such potential". Rebecca Bowden, of Yahoo! commented that during the episodes Callum is "acting like an absolute idiot, and it's making me really start to hate his character", citing Callum's reaction to Holly's ordeal and his lack of care for others as her reason for this. Bowden felt that Callum's death was a shock, explaining that the graphic nature would not have suited the pre-watershed main show. She added that she was glad to see Callum die, although she commented that during the series he "lost his personality for a little while".
