= List of Hollyoaks spinoffs =

List of Hollyoaks spinoff series

The following is a list of late night, DVD and spinoff series of the Channel 4 soap opera Hollyoaks.

== Video/DVD specials ==
=== Hollyoaks: Off on One ===
A video spinoff from 1998 which sees Rob Hawthorne seek revenge against Kurt Benson. The storyline comes to a dramatic conclusion with Rob and Kurt fighting on a boat. Rob rushes at Kurt, however he moves out of the way and Rob falls into the sea, with everyone believing he is dead. Music composed and performed by Steve Wright.

Hollyoaks: Off on One was the show's first video spinoff. The show's executive producer Jo Hallows noted it was the first time the cast had been asked to do something outside the confines of the normal show set. Production worried that the cast of newcomers to television might struggle working on a movie-style production. Hallows told Wendy Granditer from Inside Soap that "they all rose to the challenge. It made me realise how much energy and determination they all had. What they lacked in experience they more than made up for in enthusiasm."

=== Hollyoaks: Indecent Behaviour ===
A video/DVD spinoff released in 2001. Geri Hudson arrives with footballer boyfriend Jason Cunliffe. In a club, Scott Anderson begins to chat Geri up. Luke Morgan steps in to stop him taking it too far, however just as Scott and his friends are about to throw Luke into the river, Scott tells his friends that he has a better idea; Scott and his friends pull Luke's trousers down to make fun of Luke's rape from the previous year. Ben Davies and Beth Morgan try to break Scott and Luke up before a fight breaks, which it does between Ben and Luke. Beth is later offered a lift by Scott, and then is raped. Music composed and performed by Steve Wright.

== Late night specials ==
=== Hollyoaks: Lost Weekend ===
This four-episode special, broadcast 13–16 September 1999, centred on the kidnapping of Lucy Benson by Rob Hawthorne. Ruth Osborne, Lewis Richardson and Tony Hutchinson attempt to rescue Lucy, whom Rob has taken to a nautical test centre and intends to drown. Rob traps all four in a water tank, but Tony manages to open a hatch and the group are sucked out into the River Dee and make it to safety. Viewing figures for this special were Hollyoaks' highest for 1999.

=== Hollyoaks: Boys Do Barca ===
Broadcast 11 December 2000, Alex Bell, Max Cunningham, Ben Davies, Tony Hutchinson, Luke Morgan, Sam "O.B." O'Brien, Sol Patrick and Lewis Richardson make their way to Barcelona to celebrate Rory Finnigan's stag party before Finn marries Tony's mother. Tony, however, has secretly enlisted the help of Carol Groves to convince Finn not to go ahead with the marriage.

=== Hollyoaks: Breaking Boundaries ===
Broadcast 15 March 2000, the late night special involves a 90s disco at the club where Ruth Osborne discovers Lewis Richardson's gambling addiction. Ruth and Lewis eventually end up sleeping together, despite Ruth's marriage to Kurt Benson. Meanwhile, after a football match, Mark Gibbs beats up Luke Morgan before raping him.

This special was directed by Jo Hallows, Hollyoaks' series producer, and written by Neil Jones. Despite its late-night timeslot (it aired at 10.55pm) it had over three million viewers, a 21% share of the evening's audience. It was nominated for the Best Soap BAFTA TV Award, and Gary Lucy, Luke's actor, won Best Newcomer at the 2000 British Soap Awards.

=== Hollyoaks: Leap of Faith ===
Broadcast on 24 October 2003, this late night special sees Ellie Mills try to kill herself before telling serial-killer husband Toby to hand himself in to the police. Toby realises he could not live without Ellie and ends up holding her hostage on a rooftop. As Toby prepares to jump with Ellie, Dan Hunter arrives and pushes Toby off the building, killing him.

=== Hollyoaks: After Hours ===
A four-part late night series broadcast in 2004. Lisa Hunter is whisked away to Paris with a man she meets in a hotel where she worked. Joe Spencer and his friends go on a night out that ends in disaster. Meanwhile, former character Matt Musgrove crosses over to the special.

=== Hollyoaks: In Too Deep ===
In a one-off special aired on 31 May 2005, Steph Dean is haunted by the ghost of one of Toby Mills' victims and she nearly drowns. Meanwhile, Lee Hunter and Bombhead cause mayhem at the backstage of Steph's show.

Cast:

Character	Actor
Bombhead	Lee Otway
Cameron Clark	Ben Gerrard
Ben Davies	Marcus Patric
Craig Dean	Guy Burnet
Frankie Dean	Helen Pearson
Steph Dean	Carley Stenson
Lee Hunter	Alex Carter
Lisa Hunter	Gemma Atkinson
Joe Spencer	Matt Milburn
Lucy	Celena Cherry
Michelle	Lou Emmett
Simon	Sean Taylor
Vanessa	Lizzie Hills

=== Hollyoaks: Crossing the Line ===
The late night special broadcast in 2005 sees Andy Holt spike Dannii Carbone's drink with GHB before raping her. Andy then reveals his activities to his friend, Sam Owen, who agrees to join Andy to drug and rape girls. Meanwhile, Chris tricks Lee Hunter into sleeping with a transvestite called Aphrodite. Elsewhere, Ben Davies and Lisa Hunter make friends with siblings Ally and Alex.

=== Hollyoaks: No Going Back ===
Following Crossing the Line, Andy drugs Sophie and Mel Burton. He rapes Mel and leaves Sam to rape Sophie, but he does not. Dannii tells Russ Owen that she was raped. He does not believe her so she attempts suicide. Mel, Sophie and Louise Summers stop her and report Andy to the police. Sam and Andy, both on the top of a cliff, are caught in a fight between themselves and Russ. Sam and Andy both fall over the cliff. Russ manages to grab the pair, however has to let one go, so lets Andy fall to his death. Meanwhile, Rhys Ashworth, Gilly Roach, Jessica Harris and Olivia Johnson go on a trip to a spiritualist camp.

=== Hollyoaks: Back from the Dead ===
In 2006, Andy Holt returns after surviving the fall and seeks his revenge against Russ by kidnapping his sister Nicole. Sam and Russ come in to free Nicole but Andy attacks them with a metal pole and threatens to rape Nicole but then Mel bursts in and whacks him over the head with the metal pole and begins to laugh at him as she calls the police. Whilst tied up, Andy lets slip to Russ and Nicole about Sam's involvement in the rapes. Andy escapes, and Mel chases after him and he runs into a metal spike and he starts to bleed from his mouth, he starts to talk but Mel can't understand what he says. He then dies moments later as Mel watches on.

=== Hollyoaks: King of Hearts ===
A late night special called Hollyoaks: King of Hearts was announced in November 2010 and was broadcast on 15 December 2010 on Channel 4. The episode followed events in the main series which saw Kathleen McQueen blackmailing her family. The episode features Rhys Ashworth and Jacqui McQueen attempting to cheat during a game of poker with Brendan Brady and Danny Houston. After their plan is discovered, Danny tells Jacqui she must sleep with him to save Rhys and wipe the debt they owe him. The episode was originally due to air on 16 December 2010. However, this was later changed.

== Spinoff series ==
=== Hollyoaks: Movin' On ===
A sixteen-part series which aired in September and October 1999. Tony Hutchinson and Finn open their new business venture, Gnosh. Meanwhile, after beating Ruth Osborne up, Lewis, racked by guilt, commits suicide. Ruth then leaves for London.

=== Hollyoaks: Let Loose ===
A 2005 series following Ben Davies and Lisa Hunter as they depart Hollyoaks for a new life. Lisa and Ben's relationship is put to the test over Lisa's jealousy, however she agrees to give their relationship another go.

=== Hollyoaks: In the City ===
Lisa and Ben return to Liverpool, where Lisa is set up with a modelling agency. Ben spends the pair's entire savings on a bar but is conned. Lisa delves further up the career path and Ben has an illicit affair and is involved in dodgy dealings with Burton Phillips including arson and murder. Finally, Lisa ended up accidentally shooting Ben dead as he tried to save her from being used in a snuff film.

=== Hollyoaks Later ===
2008 series following Niall Rafferty as he returns for revenge on Steph Cunningham, Craig Dean and Tom Cunningham, which leads to the dramatic death of Niall. Meanwhile, Kris and Malachy Fisher return to Ireland to attend their father's funeral as Malachy and Mercedes McQueen marry. Sarah Barnes, Nancy Hayton and Zoe Carpenter head off on a "girly" road trip as the Dirty Diegos enter 'Battle of the Bands'.

A second series was commissioned and was broadcast in September 2009. It follows four main stories: Hannah, Rhys and Josh Ashworth go off to a music festival, where they encounter a dangerous drug dealer, Tony Hutchinson marries Cindy Cunningham after several mishaps, the McQueens go to London for Theresa's modelling and Sarah Barnes and Zoe Carpenter are joined by Sarah's jealous girlfriend Lydia Hart on a parachute jump which leads to Sarah's death after Lydia sabotages her parachute.

In April 2010, Channel 4 announced that the show would return for a third series, this time produced by Hollyoaks series producer Paul Marquess. The characters appearing included: Mitzeee Minniver, Carl Costello, Riley Costello, Seth Costello, Malachy Fisher, Mercedes Fisher, Theresa McQueen and Nancy Hayton. Filming took place in the summer of 2010, and in October 2010, it was revealed that the third series would begin on 25 October, and would closely interweave with the main Hollyoaks series, revolving around "one fateful night". UFC Fighter Michael Bisping guest starred.

It Was reported that a fourth series had been recommissioned due to the popularity of the last few series. Filming will take place in the summer of 2011. Characters rumoured to be involved in the storylines have included Mercedes McQueen, Myra McQueen, Michaela McQueen, Texas Longford, Silas Blissett, Heidi Costello, Riley Costello, Lynsey Nolan and Mitzeee Minniver. New cast members include a new addition to the McQueen family played by Amy Walsh sister of Girls aloud star Kimberly Walsh and a new unnamed hunk to be played by ex-EastEnders actor Chris Coghill. By early June scenes had begun filming in Ibiza with Mercedes McQueen, Myra McQueen, Michaela McQueen, Theresa McQueen, Will Savage, Rae Wilson and Mitzeee Minniver. Series 4 is set to be aired over the course of five nights from 5 to 10 September 2011. In the gripping final episode of the series, Rae Wilson was strangled by Silas Blissett after he heard that Brendan Brady wanted to kill her. He wanted Brendan to be arrested on suspicion of murder so that he could continue with his evil plans.

=== Hollyoaks Does Come Dine with Me ===
2015 series based on the Channel 4 evening programme Come Dine with Me. The series aired at 7:30pm on E4 during the 20th Anniversary Week. Jimmy McKenna (Jack Osborne), Jessica Fox (Nancy Osborne), Kieron Richardson (Ste Hay), Kirsty Leigh Porter (Leela Lomax), Jessica Ellis (Tegan Lomax) and Jacqueline Boatswain (Simone Loveday) were the Hollyoaks stars that took part. The series was revived in 2020 for the 25th anniversary of Hollyoaks, with Gary Lucy (Luke Morgan), Ruby O'Donnell (Peri Lomax), Rishi Nair (Sami Maalik), Jorgie Porter (Theresa McQueen) and Jeremy Edwards (Kurt Benson) competing. Once again, the series was brought back in 2025 to celebrate the 30th anniversary of Hollyoaks, with Charlie Wernham (Robbie Roscoe), Isabelle Smith (Francine Osborne), Anya Lawrence (Vicky Grant), Nicole Barber-Lane (Myra McQueen) and James Redmond (Rory Finnigan) competing.

== Online spinoffs ==
=== Hollyoaks: The Morning After the Night Before ===
Josh Ashworth heads off to party with Dave Colburn in Manchester in the on-line spinoff which features the down side to binge drinking.

=== Hollyoaks: Freshers ===
Freshers is a 2010 online drama following the lives of the fresher students before they begin at Hollyoaks Community College. Like The Morning After the Night Before, several characters' social networking websites were created, this time using Facebook. The series featured the return of Lee Hunter, and debut of new characters Jamil Fadel, Leanne Holiday and Doug Carter. It also starred Charlotte Lau, India Longford, Texas Longford and Dave Colburn. A return also featured Bombhead.

=== Hollyoaks: Tom's Life ===
Tom struggles to cope with Nancy and Darren's breakup and attempts to reconcile them. When his plan fails, he becomes discouraged but later discovers a previously unknown talent.

=== Hollyoaks: Access All Areas ===
==== Series 1 (2015) ====
1. Amanda Clapham (Holly Cunningham)
2. James Sutton (John Paul McQueen)
3. Jessica Fox (Nancy Osborne)
4. Jorgie Porter (Theresa McQueen)
5. Parry Glasspool (Harry Thompson)
6. Jazmine Franks (Esther Bloom)
7. Charlie Wernham (Robbie Roscoe)
8. Anna Passey (Sienna Blake)
9. Cameron Moore (Cameron Campbell)
10. Tamara Wall (Grace Black)
11. Fabrizio Santino (Ziggy Roscoe)
12. Nikki Sanderson (Maxine Minniver)

==== Series 2 (2016) ====
1. Charlie Clapham (Freddie Roscoe)
2. Stephanie Waring (Cindy Savage)
3. Sophie Austin (Lindsey Roscoe)
4. Kieron Richardson (Ste Hay)
5. Jacqueline Boatswain & Karl Collins (Simone & Louis Loveday)
6. Daisy Wood-Davis (Kim Butterfield)
7. Jamie Lomas (Warren Fox)
8. Gregory Finnegan (James Nightingale)
9. Richard Linnell & Kassius Nelson (Alfie Nightingale & Jade Albright)
10. Duncan James (Ryan Knight)

==== Series 3 (2017) ====
1. Kirsty-Leigh Porter (Leela Lomax)
2. Duayne Boachie (Zack Loveday)
3. Amy Conachan (Courtney Campbell)

=== Hollyoaks: IRL ===
Hollyoaks IRL is a five-part documentary series that premiered in 2021. The series explores real-life experiences relating to depression and suicide, county lines, child exploitation, disability, eating disorders and conversion therapy, reflecting of topics that were featured in Hollyoaks storylines.

Mental health campaigner John Junior's story inspired the series after they discussed their experiences with suicidal thoughts and the impact of a Hollyoaks storyline on BBC Radio 5 Live. Junior featured in the series, sharing their story.

Hollyoaks IRL was nominated for the British Academy Television Award for Best Short Form Programme in 2022. On 26 November 2022, the series won Best Digital Creativity at the Royal Television Society North West Awards.

Series 1 Cast:

- Ashley Taylor Dawson and John Junior (Episode 1 - "Hollyoaks Saved My Life")
- Ross Adams and Justin Beck (Episode 2 - "I Survived Conversion Therapy")
- Billy Price and Josh Connolly (Episode 3 - "Trapped as a Teenage Drug Dealer")
- Rhiannon Clements and Monique Jarett (Episode 4 - "Do You See a Model or a Disability?")
- Nadine Mulkerrin and Ben Robinson (Episode 5 - "Surviving Anorexia")

Series 2 Cast:

- Nikki Sanderson and Zan Moon (Episode 1 - "Attacked and Ignored")
- James Sutton and Dominic McGregor (Episode 2 - "Sobriety Saved My Life")
- Angus Castle-Doughty (Episode 3 - "Incel - A Search Into Hate")
- Richard Blackwood and Mark Bracewell (Episode 4 - "Knife Crime - Losing My Eye Helped Me See")
- Niamh Blackshaw and Shell Rowe (Episode 5 - "My Cancer Story - From Treatment To Trending")

== Media content ==
=== Hollyoaks Highs: The Wicked Bits ===
Highlights show made in 1999 to mark Hollyoaks going three times a week.

=== Hollyoaks: Search for a Star ===
A short series on Channel 4 where Hollyoaks held open auditions to cast a new character and showed the audition process.

=== Hollyoaks: Access All Areas ===
This 2000 documentary which features Hollyoaks cast discussing various sexual matters.

=== Hollyoaks on the Pull ===
On the Pull was a campaign to recruit new Hollyoaks cast members through open auditions. The first series of auditions took place in 2000, followed by a second round in 2004. Documentary coverage of the 2000 auditions aired in October that year; coverage of the 2004 auditions was broadcast between December 2004 and February 2005.

After an open Hollyoaks audition in Manchester in March 2000 attracted 8000 people, the programme's producers planned the first On the Pull, a nationwide search for new cast members. Auditions were held in London, Edinburgh, Chester, Cardiff and Belfast, and successful candidates were called back for auditions in Liverpool with executive producer Phil Redmond. Over 40,000 people auditioned, and four were cast: Marcus Patric as Ben Davies, Andrew Somerville as Theo Sankofa, Elize du Toit as Izzy Cornwell and Lesley Johnston as Laura Burns.

=== Hollyoaks Backstage ===
A weekly on-line documentary featuring various members of the Hollyoaks cast showing viewers behind the scenes of the show. Each 3 minute episode is shown broadcast weekly on the E4 website.

=== The Hollyoaks Music Show ===
The Hollyoaks Music Show is a music television programme broadcast as part of T4 on Channel 4. The show began broadcasting on 17 October 2009, following a pilot episode in 2008, and features various recording artists performing and participating in the show. It is sponsored by British retailer Matalan and hosted by Rick Edwards.

The series first began in 2008, when it was named Hollyoaks Music Special, a one-off programme hosted by Rick Edwards and former Hollyoaks actor Matt Littler. Following its success, Channel 4 commissioned two series and retailer Matalan became the show's official sponsor, in order to reach the target audience of 16- to 34-year-olds. Repeats of the series have been shown on 4Music since 2010. In 2009 the first series aired, retitled The Hollyoaks Music Show. When the new series was broadcast, it was shown as part of T4 weekly on Channel 4, again presented by Rick Edwards. It is filmed within the Hollyoaks studios in Childwall, Liverpool. The show features signed and unsigned acts performing in and around the Hollyoaks set. A Christmas special was announced in November 2010, due to air in December.

Acts which have appeared include The Saturdays, Mr Hudson, Chipmunk, Tinchy Stryder, N-Dubz and Calvin Harris, Example, Jason Derulo, Diana Vickers, Olly Murs, The Wanted and You Me at Six as well as some unsigned acts including Vienna Ditto, Minnie Londoner and The Palpitations. The show regularly features members of the Hollyoaks cast as part of the audience.

Along with the performances, The Hollyoaks Music Show also features fashion awards in each episode from episode 11 onwards. The award is presented to an act from the same episode for their clothing style. Acts who won the award include Olly Murs, Rihanna, Selena Gomez, McFly and JLS.

A competition was run online throughout the series, with the winner given the chance to appear performing in an episode of Hollyoaks. The winner was Shide Boss.

== Other related shows ==
=== Hollyoaks: The Good, the Bad and the Gorgeous ===
A drama-documentary shown on E4 on 2 October 2009, looking back at the past 14 years, showing classic clips from the series. Ste Hay and Cheryl Brady go to a cinema where old clips from Hollyoaks are being shown by a familiar face. It was presented by Bernard Latham who played Gordon Cunningham. For the episode, special sequences were filmed between old clips of the show. They parodied such films as Stanley Kubrick's The Shining and Randal Kleiser's Grease.

=== Hollyoaks Best Bits 2011 ===
A sequel to the 2009 one-off compilation special. First shown on 23 December 2011, Will Best looks back at some of the biggest and best moments from Hollyoaks 2011. The show also includes some interviews from its main cast such as: Scarlett Bowman, Dylan Llewellyn, Tosin Cole, Karen Hassan amongst many others. Unlike the recent show, this one had exclusive sketches from Alex Carter and Lee Otway, plus a cheeky look of highlights for 2012.

=== Hollyoaks: A Little Film About Love ===
A special E4 only episode which aired on 11 November 2011 following characters Jason Costello and Bart McQueen travelling to London to stop Sinead O'Connor from leaving with boyfriend Gaz Bennett, during the journey Jason records on a camera as documentary, it also features pre-recorded clips of Jason interviewing characters such as Maddie Morrison, Myra McQueen and Neil Cooper . It also features Jono, Ruby Button and Duncan Button.

=== Hollyoaks: Chasing Rainbows ===
A Special E4 only episode which aired on 7 June 2012, that follows Dennis Savage on his journey with students Leanne Holiday, Barney Harper-McBride and Scott Sabeka who travel to Liverpool to seek out musician Maverick Sabre to headline the Savage's Forest Party back in the village, Dennis struggles to prove throughout that he knows Maverick and will be able to find him in time for the party.

=== Hollyoaks: The Story of... ===
- Mercedes – Murder, affairs and a LOT of bodycon...join Hollyoaks actress Jennifer Metcalfe as she looks back at the life of Mercedes McQueen. Features backstage secrets and clips from the show.
- Darren's Biggest Dating Disasters – Hollyoaks star Ashley Taylor Dawson takes us through Darren's biggest dating disasters.
- Sinead's Most Life-Changing Moments – Revenge, tragedy, bombs... Stephanie Davis takes us through some of Sinead's biggest moments!
- Ste's Greatest Shockers – Hollyoaks actor Kieron Richardson relives his character's most shocking moments.
- Tony's 20 Years in Hollyoaks – For Hollyoaks' 20th anniversary, actor Nick Pickard relives Tony's memorable storylines.
- Sienna's Most WTH?! Moments – A faked pregnancy, fancying her twin brother... relive Sienna's *slightly* unusual stories.

=== Hollyoaks Favourites ===
An E4 series hosted by cast members of Hollyoaks. Due to the COVID-19 pandemic, production on Hollyoaks was suspended until further notice, and episodes were cut down to two per week, rather than the usual five, to preserve content. Hollyoaks Favourites was broadcast on the three other nights instead of new episodes. The series shows cast members showcasing notable past episodes of Hollyoaks.

=== Hollyoaks@25 ===
Hollyoaks@25 is a series that began airing in July 2020. Airing as a five-week special, the series explores moments from the first 25 years of Hollyoaks.
