= Carol Groves =

UK soap opera character, created 1996

- Hollyoaks character
- Portrayed by: Natalie Casey
- Duration: 1996–2000, 2025
- First appearance: 22 January 1996
- Last appearance: 20 October 2025
In-universe information
- Occupation: Singer
- Sisters: Anita Groves

Carol Groves is a fictional character from the British television soap opera Hollyoaks, played by Natalie Casey. Carol first appeared in the serial on 22 January 1996. In August 2000, it was announced that Casey had quit the role and would film her final scenes at the end of the month. Carol remained with the serial until 11 December 2000, when she left the village. On 19 August 2025, it was announced that Casey was one of three major cast members confirmed to be returning to the show for the shows 30th anniversary which due to air in October. Carol returned on 14 October 2025.

== Development ==
=== Casting ===
Casey went through three auditions before she was cast as Carol. She won the role ahead of 250 other actors who also went up for it. After six months in the role, Casey was offered a new, year-long contract.

=== Characterisation ===
Carol was introduced as Lucy Benson's (Kerrie Taylor) "very loyal" best friend. She is "hopelessly" and obsessively in love with Lucy's brother Kurt (Jeremy Edwards), who does not reciprocate her feelings at all. Casey disliked her character's infatuation with Kurt, saying "I'd be hitting her! If she was 13, yes, but at 17 she shouldn't channel all her emotions into one lad who doesn't even like her." Tim Davey of the Bristol Evening Post described the character as wanting to be popular and admired. Casey told him that she would never be friends with Carol because she is "pathetically sad". She thought Carol did not understand how she came across, explaining that the girls like her, but the guys find her "scary" as she is too nice.

The Liverpool Echo described Carol as "Weird and wacky" before describing her time on the show saying: "Carol enjoyed dalliances with characters Kurt, Tony and Finn. Singing at The Loft, she was spotted and offered a cruise ship job".

=== Departure ===
In August 2000, Casey announced that she had quit and was filming her final scenes with the series at the end of the month. She departed on 23 October 2000.

== Storylines ==
Carol first appeared on in Hollyoaks when she was on a double date with her friend Lucy Benson. She was a keen musician, who started The Crazy Bazz Studs with Lucy and Bazil "Bazz FM" McCourtey, she had a life changing moment when she was involved the crash that resulted in Dermot Ashton's death. Carol's near death experience initiated her belief that she was psychic. Almost instantly, Carol allegedly had a gift for reading people's auras and an all seeing eye, which helped her predict what was to come and alert her when there was trouble in the air. Undoubtedly Carol's spookiest moment was when she returned from Ireland and had a sinister premonition that something unwelcome was coming into their midst. Within moments, Lucy got a call telling her that Kurt had died.

Carol's kookiness continued throughout the rest of her time on the show. While she had a brief attachment to Kurt, Carol seemed destined never to find a guy she liked, despite the odd dalliance with the likes of Tony Hutchinson in Newquay. Carol eventually meets Rory "Finn" Finnigan and falls in love. Carol was also a loyal and trusted friend to Lucy, helping her get through the worst of her drug addiction. Her friendship with Lucy caused her to put her own life in jeopardy with Rob Hawthorne, but demonstrated just how dependable Carol was to those she loved.

After Lucy left, while she continued to get into scrapes with Tony and Finn, Carol missed having her best friend around. She soon turned her attentions to herself and became preoccupied with having a breast enlargement. Just before her operation, she read her tarot cards and discovered that she was destined to meet a man in a white suit. Assuming this was a doctor, she was dismayed to find him dressed in green and made a quick getaway! Still feeling disillusioned, Carol agreed to help Finn and Lewis Richardson by singing at the opening of The Loft. During her performance, she was spotted by a talent scout, who offered her a job singing on a cruise ship. After much soul searching, Carol agreed to take the job. She arrived at the boat and was greeted by a uniformed officer, her man in white. Carol returned briefly to Hollyoaks to appear in the Barcelona special, Hollyoaks: Boys Do Barca and heartstrings were pulled yet again as she and Tony realised that they had feelings for each other. Carol returned to her boat, but promised Tony that she would come back to him. Carol later phoned Finn, telling him to break the news to Tony that she has met someone else and would no longer return.

== Reception ==
In 1999, Carol was nominated for Funniest Character at the Inside Soap Awards. Lorna Cooper of MSN TV listed Carol of one of the soap's "forgotten characters".
