= Episode 4429 (Hollyoaks) =

2016 episode of Hollyoaks

- Hollyoaks episode
- Episode no.: Episode 4429
- Directed by: Daikin Marsh
- Written by: Steven Fay
- Original air date: 13 July 2016
- Running time: 30 mins (including advertisements)

Episode chronology
← Previous "Episode 4428"	Next → "Episode 4430"

Episode 4429 of the British television soap opera Hollyoaks is a three hander between characters Tony Hutchinson (Nick Pickard), Harry Thompson (Parry Glasspool) and Ste Hay (Kieron Richardson). The episode primarily focuses on Ste's addiction to crystal meth. During the episode, Harry learns about Ste's past with Amy Barnes (Ashley Slanina-Davies).

== Plot ==
The episode begins with Ste Hay (Kieron Richardson) sitting at Tony Hutchinson's (Nick Pickard) flat where Harry Thompson (Parry Glasspool) is trying to get him to eat. Harry tells Ste that Tony is looking into getting a rehab for Ste. Ste tries to walk out but Harry manages to stop him. Tony appears and shows Ste some DIY work. Tony convinces Ste that the work will focus his mind off the drugs. Tony also reveals that he has a room for Ste. Ste goes into the bathroom to have a shower, Tony rushes in to get Ste's phone. Tony convinces Ste to get clean for his children. Tony is dancing to a song on the radio where Ste comes in after his shower with clothes that don't fit him. Ste then breaks the piggy bank that belongs to Tony's twins when Harry won't give him the money that he stole from the Roscoe's. Tony threatens to call the police but Harry convinces him not to. Harry follows Ste outside where Ste punches him and Harry lands on the ground. Ste immediately regrets punching Harry. Tony, Harry and Ste go back to the flat, Harry overhears Ste telling Tony that he isn't a domestic abuser anymore.

During the night, Ste demands the key to the door but Harry refuses. Ste verbally abuses Harry but Tony tells him it's only the drugs talking. Tony reassures Ste that they're trying to help him. While Ste is asleep, Harry quizzes Tony about Ste's earlier statement. Tony explains Ste's past with Amy where Harry is visibly disgusted. Harry leaves the house to clear his mind. Later, Tony makes Ste drink a glass of water. Ste talks to Tony about his regrets of helping her die. Tony reassures him that he was just trying to be a good son. Harry returns home and sits down and comforts Ste throughout the night.

In the morning, Tony finds Ste and Harry asleep on the sofa. Ste returns the money he stole from the piggy bank. Tony promises to pay for a private rehab where Ste feels like he doesn't deserve it. Harry promises Ste that he will stick by him. Tony tells Ste a story that stuck with him at church (The Footprints). Tony and Harry hug Ste as the episode ends.

== Production ==
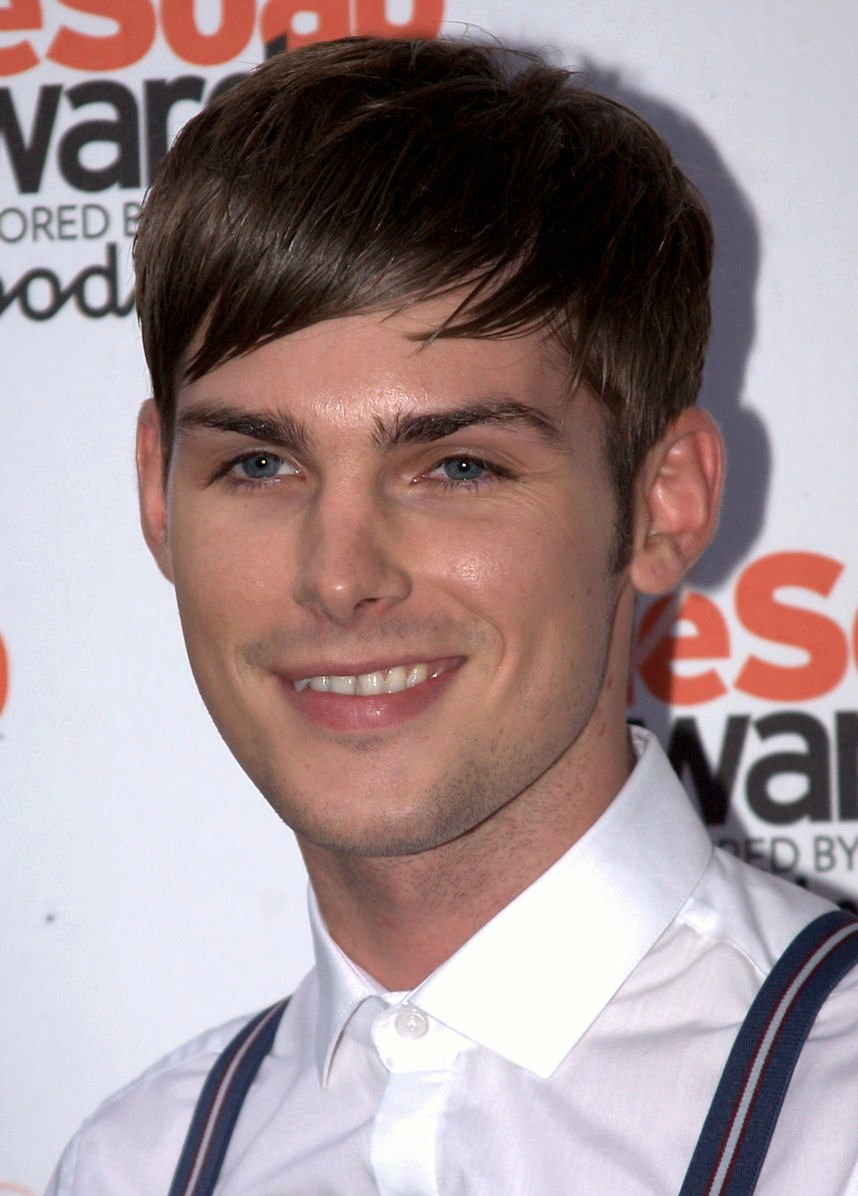
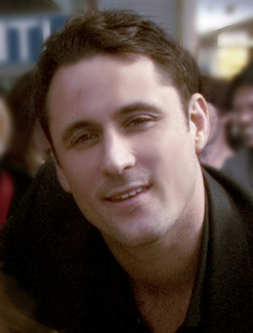
Kieron Richardson, Nick Pickard and Parry Glasspool (pictured) feature in the episode.

Episode 4429 was first publicised by Kieron Richardson. He was being interviewed by Daniel Kilkelly from Digital Spy at the British Soap Awards 2016. He said that the episode would only feature the characters of Ste, Harry and Tony; a special constructed episode dubbed a "three hander". This was the show's second "three hander" stylised episode, the first airing in 2011, which focused on the characters of Jacqui McQueen (Claire Cooper), Rhys Ashworth (Andrew Moss) and Gilly Roach (Anthony Quinlan).

Richardson had revealed that the three-hander would feature his character, going cold turkey. Richardson had stated, "We were filming for four days, mainly in Tony's flat, and I had to show Ste in a frantic comedown state, so it was pretty exhausting."

Richardson said in an interview with What's on TV, "It’s very exciting and intense. We filmed a special episode with just Ste, his boyfriend, Harry [Parry Glasspool] and friend Tony [Nick Pickard] and it was so powerful. I made myself feel poorly for real. It’s unlike any episode of Hollyoaks you’ve ever seen. It’s a bit of a nod to the film Trainspotting. Harry and Tony are trying to fight for Ste’s life. They lock him in the flat to try and stop him getting more drugs and the comedown is horrific. The audience goes through it all with Ste."

In an interview with Radio Times, Richardson was worried about the topic being controversial for the show's timeslot, he said "I am scared. I'm thinking that there might be reshoots because it's too extreme. I've literally gone for it".

== Reception ==
"Episode 4429" appeared in an article published via Digital Spy. It compiled ten unmissable soap storylines airing the week the episode was broadcast. Their reporter, Kilkelly, warned that viewers could expect harrowing scenes in the episode. Richardson received a considerable amount of praise via the social networking website Twitter. His performance mostly drew an emotional reaction from viewers conversing on the platform.

Duncan Lindsay of Metro said "Hollyoaks is often regarded as the underdog of the soap world – without much justification – but continually proves that it can deliver high octane and powerful drama as well as its rivals. The three hander on E4, led by emotive performances from Kieron Richardson, has shown, once more, that it deserves far more credit." Lindsay went on to say "the episode flew by and left us gripped from start to finish." While he added "The effective episode has revealed that Hollyoaks deserves the credit it gets but also highlights that living in the shadows of its equally strong counterparts remains the biggest injustice in the soap world." Lindsay had earlier stated "With secrets from the past coming out, big decisions made and Ste at an all time low, it’s an unmissable visit to Hollyoaks that will answer the following questions. Will Ste come out the other side? Will Harry stand by him? Will the truth about Cameron’s involvement come out?"

Daniel Kilkelly of Digital Spy stated "Bravo to Hollyoaks trio Kieron Richardson, Nick Pickard and Parry Glasspool, who pulled some of their most powerful performances out of the bag in their special episode tonight (July 13)."

Carl Greenwood of Daily Mirror stated "Hollyoaks has made history with its first three-hander episode." Greenwood also reported that "fans praise 'incredible' Kieron Richardson after emotionally powerful performance moves them to tears." He also stated, "Actor Kieron Richardson knocked his performance out of the park as Ste as he veered from begging for help and viciously attacking his loved ones for trying to keep him from getting his next fix."

A reporter for Attitude said that "Things get even darker for 'Starry' in tonight's special episode of the Channel 4 soap." Inside Soap included the episode in their "pick of the day" feature, with their writer describing "very disturbing scenes" and branding it an unmissable episode. They wrote about the episode "It’s a very special episode of Hollyoaks tonight, with only three actors involved. Tony and Harry spend a night trying to help Ste through his drug withdrawal – so prepare yourselves for some very disturbing scenes as Ste lashes out at the people who love him. You really mustn’t miss this!"

Rachel McGrath of Huffington Post wrote "In one of the most emotionally-charged scenes, Ste - spurred on by desperation to feed his habit - attacked Harry, which brought back memories of the violence he put his ex Amy Barnes through."
