= Rory Finnigan =

UK soap opera character, created 1998

- Hollyoaks character
- Portrayed by: James Redmond
- Duration: 1998–2002, 2013, 2015, 2017–2018, 2025
- First appearance: 8 June 1998
- Last appearance: 20 October 2025
- Introduced by: Jo Hallows (1998); Bryan Kirkwood (2013, 2015, 2017); Hannah Cheers (2025)
- Spin-off appearances: Hollyoaks: Movin' On (2001); Hollyoaks Later (2013)
In-universe information
- Father: Eric Finnigan
- Wife: Victoria Hutchinson (2001–2002)
- Stepsons: Tony Hutchinson

Rory "Finn" Finnigan is a fictional character from the British Channel 4 soap opera Hollyoaks, played by James Redmond. He first appeared in June 1998 before leaving in January 2002. He left to return to his previous life before his time in Hollyoaks village. Finn returned for the sixth series of Hollyoaks Later. Hollyoaks celebrated twenty years on air in October 2015, with Redmond reprising his role for the celebrations. In October 2017, Hollyoaks confirmed that Finn was returning at Christmas. Finn returned on 14 December 2017 and again the following year, last appearing on 5 March 2018. On 19 August 2025, it was confirmed that Redmond reprised his role as part of the shows 30th anniversary, which is due to air in October. Finn returned on 14 October 2025. Finn departed again 20 October 2025

== Casting ==
In 2009 the Daily Star reported current Hollyoaks producer Lucy Allan was planning to lure Redmond back into his role. On 12 June 2013, it was announced that Redmond had reprised his role for the sixth series of Hollyoaks Later. On 6 October 2015 it was announced that Redmond will be briefly reprising the role for its 20th anniversary. In October 2017, it was announced that Redmond would return to the soap. Hollyoaks executive producer, Bryan Kirkwood, explained that he decided to bring back the "much-loved" character for a guest stint in order to "celebrate the loyalty of [the] audience", and that the production team had been inspired over the positive reception of the returns of Luke Morgan (Gary Lucy) and Mandy Richardson (Sarah Jayne Dunn), who had returned earlier that year. Kirkwood added:

"I think there was a feeling up until our 20th birthday that we should always be looking forward – they were certainly conversations that we had with Channel 4. But now that we've reached the ripe old age of 22, it's fantastic to be able to celebrate the loyalty of our audience. Some of the people who started watching us as teenagers are now mums themselves, who are maybe watching Hollyoaks with their own teenagers. It's fantastic to have Luke and Mandy back in the show. We've got to strike the right balance. We need to move forward with our new, brilliant cast while also having a healthy dose of nostalgia."

Finn returned on 14 December 2017. Kirkwood also revealed that the character would also reappear in 2018.

== Characterisation ==
Rory has been described as a "cheeky chancer" and a " heart-throb".

== Storylines ==
Rory Finnigan, better known as Finn, was lovable and cheeky. Finn arrived in Hollyoaks when Tony Hutchinson discovered a supposed vagrant sleeping in Jambo's old shed. Little did Tony realise that this philosophical, free-spirited charmer would become one of his closest friends. Immediately, Tony went on a mission to have Finn evicted from the shed, beginning a comical rivalry that would continue throughout Finn's time in the village. Finn's father was in prison and his mother was dead, so he tended to drift from place to place. He had no idea how long he would remain in Hollyoaks, yet he planned to stick around and see what opportunities came his way. Whilst persevering in his war with Tony, Finn soon hooked up with Lewis Richardson and together they ran a market in the Yard, with Finn specialising in selling antiques. Along the way, Finn embarked on quite a few money-making ventures, the most infamous being the time he decided to use his double-decker bus as a tour bus around Chester, procuring the services of Carol Groves as the unsuspecting tour guide.

Finn's enigmatic status attracted considerable interest from women in Hollyoaks including Jude Cunningham, Kate Patrick, Carol and Geri Hudson, even more so when he revealed that he was, in fact, Lord Kildiggin and heir to a castle in Ireland. True to his nature, Finn declined the inheritance of his castle and although he retained his title, he preferred the life of an anonymous drifter. Carol and Finn embarked on a passionate and sometimes tumultuous relationship, climaxing in a marathon 48-hour session on Finn's bus, yet Chis free-spirited nature and roving eye brought the relationship to a premature close. Finn and Lewis found another money-making idea when they began to organise Nineties revival nights at a local club, giving them the idea of building their own night-club. After using Finn's title to secure a bank loan, the pair finally got the go ahead to build The Loft. Problems in Finn's relationship with Tony resurfaced when an unsuspecting Finn embarked on an affair with a woman called Victoria (Fiona Mollison). Even Finn was shocked to discover that she was Tony's mother. Unsurprisingly, Tony was actively against the union, but the two carried on regardless. Soon, Victoria became Victoria Finnigan and along with the marriage came Finn's new role as Tony's stepfather. Finn and Victoria's marriage lasted for six months, collapsing after Victoria discovered that Finn had been unfaithful. The end of the marriage marked the beginning of Finn's life crisis when he began to question what it was he wanted from life.

Whilst business at The Loft continued to thrive, Finn became increasingly bored with life and, after learning that Lewis had got himself in debt and had to put the future of the club in jeopardy, he persuaded Tony to buy out Lewis. Finn returned the favour by buying into Tony's new restaurant 'Il Gnosh' and they both became embroiled in a new set of adventures in Hollyoaks: Movin' On. Finn's life crisis continued, however, and Lewis's shocking death only underscored his belief that life was indeed too short. Whilst Finn returned to Hollyoaks, it was not long before he moved on. He left the running of The Loft to Tony, saying that he wanted to return to the life he used to have, the life of uncertainty. And so Finn boarded a barge with a mystery woman (cameo appearance by TV presenter Cat Deeley) and sailed off into the sunset.

Finn returned in 2013 for series six of Hollyoaks: Later in which he, Tony, Harry Thompson (Parry Glasspool) and Dom Reilly (John Pickard) go to Spain to attend Dom's wedding and embark on crazy adventures and run foul of a gangster known as The White Man (Danny Dyer). Kurt Benson (Jeremy Edwards) also appeared as visions in Tony's mind

In October 2015, Finn returns to Hollyoaks for the vow renewal of Tony and Diane O'Connor (Alex Fletcher). In December 2017, Finn returns to help Diane who is worried about Tony's mental health, later, he takes a drunken Cindy Cunningham home. In February 2018, Finn returns and tries to buy the restaurant with Tony but is shocked to find out that Tony has brought the restaurant with other villagers and never asked Finn. Finn catches up with Luke Morgan and gives Tony a present of an old newspaper of the restaurant years ago. Finn decides to enter business with Cindy instead but they don't have the money. Cindy robs 10,000 Off Tom and puts it on a dog but it fails to win. Milo tracks the IP address for Tom and blames Finn for taking the money. Milo wants to get rid of Finn as Finn doesn't like him. Cindy admits to Finn that she took the money but Finn still takes the blame. He promises to pay Tom back and after saying goodbye to Tony, Finn leaves for Margate.

== Reception ==
MSN described him as having "a face like a seal". When speaking about Finn's 2017 return, Eden-Olivia Lord from Closer called him a "fun character" and agreed with Kirkwood's decision to reintroduce former characters from nostalgia. Lord also wrote "Eek!" when speaking about the character's return. Daniel Kilkelly from Digital Spy called the character a "cheeky chappy".
