= John Junior =

British mental health campaigner (born 1988)

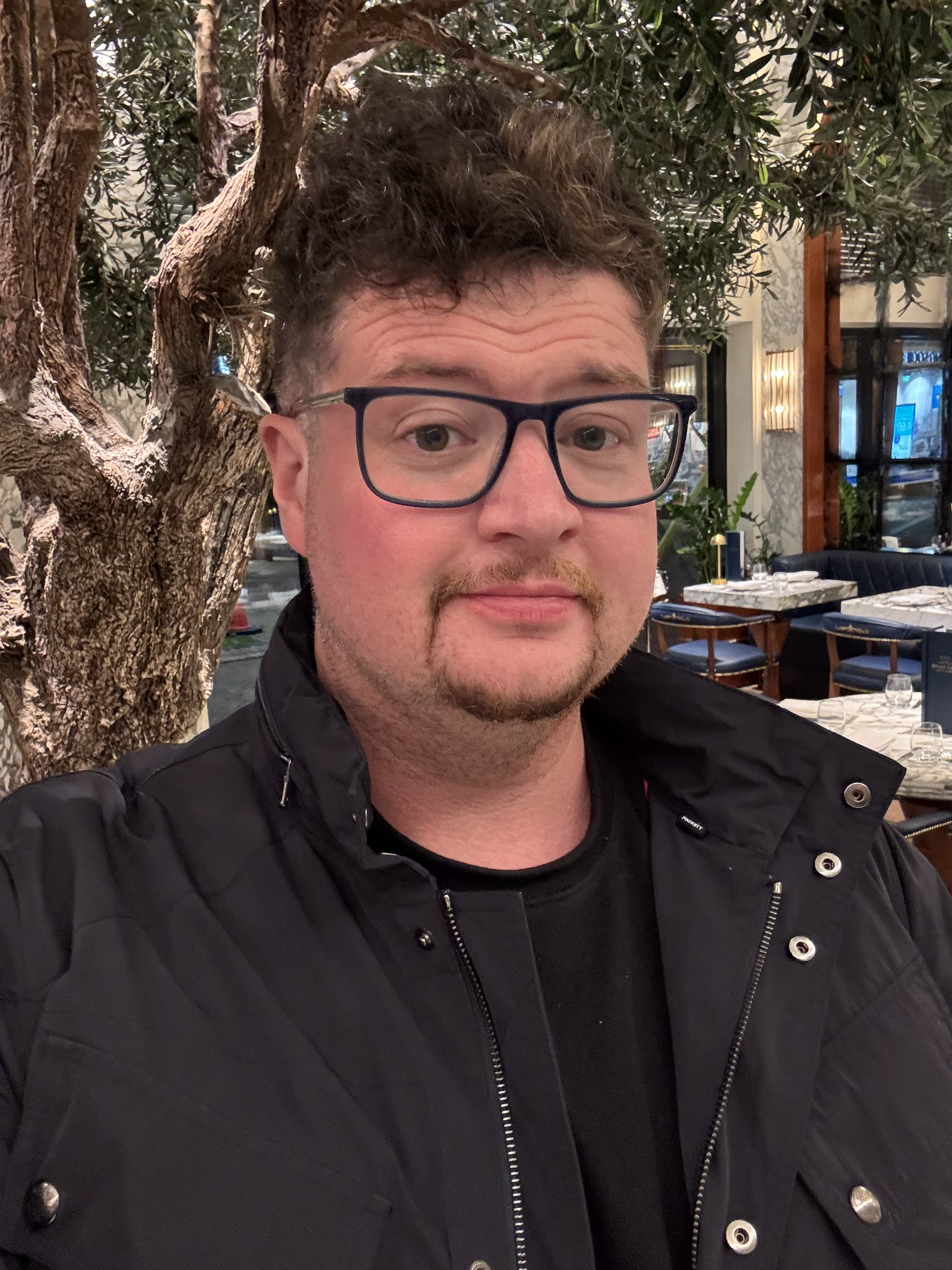
- Junior in 2024
- Born: October 4, 1988 (age 37); Wythenshawe, Manchester, England
- Occupation: Mental Health Campaigner
- Years active: 2019-present
- Known for: Appearing in Hollyoaks: IRL and mental health campaigning
- Website: www.johnjuniormentalhealth.co.uk

John Junior (born 4 October 1988) is a British mental health campaigner. They are known for appearing in the Channel 4 documentary series Hollyoaks IRL, where they discussed their experiences with mental health and how a suicide storyline in the soap Hollyoaks affected them during the COVID-19 lockdown.

Junior began mental health campaigning in 2019, founding 'John and Charlie's Journey' to raise awareness of mental health and suicide prevention. They later campaigned for improved access to dialectical behaviour therapy through the National Health Service.

== Early and personal life ==
Junior was diagnosed with Klinefelter syndrome during childhood. They have described experiencing difficulties with their gender identity from a young age and later identified as genderfluid.

Junior began taking sertraline in 2017, after being diagnosed with depression and generalised anxiety disorder. During the COVID-19 lockdown, they stopped taking the medication after experiencing side effects.

Following the death of their father in 2018, Junior experienced a deterioration in their mental health. In August 2019, they were diagnosed with Emotionally unstable personality disorder, also known as Borderline personality disorder.

== Activism ==
In November 2019, Junior started ''John and Charlie's Journey'', a mental health awareness campaign to reduce stigma and encourage people to speak openly about their mental health. Junior has travelled across the UK and internationally with Charlie the toy duck as part of their mental health campaigning. Junior described Charlie as a ''conversation starter'' to encourage conversations about mental health. As part of the campaign, Junior met people experiencing mental health difficulties, providing peer support and signposting them to mental health charities and other support services. Junior later stated that ''John and Charlie's Journey'' had spoken with 1,600 people face to face, while reaching millions of people through social media.

In 2020, Junior was invited to speak about their mental health campaign during a Boyzlife concert and appearing on stage with Keith Duffy and Brian McFadden.

In September 2020, Junior launched DBT for all, a campaign for wider access to dialectical behaviour therapy throughout the NHS. The campaign was supported by Esther McVey, MP for Tatton, who applied for the issue to be discussed in Parliament.

Junior has worked with the mental health charity Mind as a volunteer. Their experience of the Hollyoaks mental health storyline has been featured in Mind's guidance on the portrayal of mental health on television.

In 2023, Junior appeared on Sky News to discuss the response of emergency services to people experiencing mental health crisis. During the segment, they advocated for better mental health crisis training for emergency services in the United Kingdom.

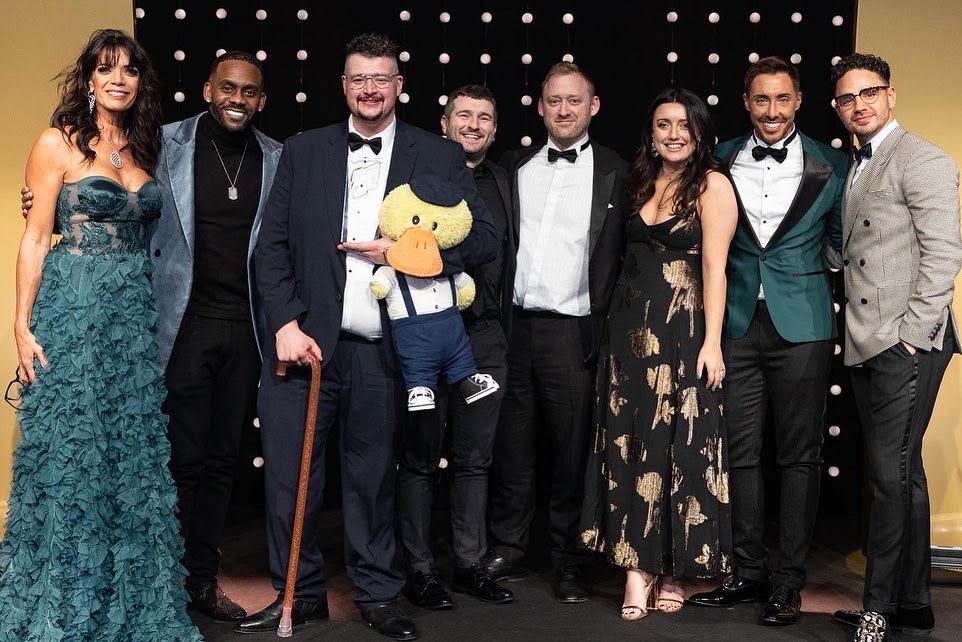
Royal Television Society, North West Awards 2022

== Hollyoaks ==
During the first COVID-19 lockdown in 2020, Junior experienced suicidal thoughts and said the Hollyoaks storyline encouraged them to seek support. Junior discussed the impact of the storyline with actor Ashley Taylor Dawson, who portrays Darren Osborne, on BBC Radio 5.

In 2021, Junior's experience was featured in Hollyoaks IRL, a series of short documentaries commissioned by Channel 4 and produced by Lime Pictures exploring real-life experiences connected with storylines from Hollyoaks. Junior appeared in the first episode, which focused on the impact the programme's mental health and suicide storyline had on them. The series was nominated for the British Academy Television Award for Best Short Form Programme in 2022 and won Best Digital Creativity at the Royal Television Society, North West Awards. Junior attended the 2022 British Academy Television Awards with Charlie the Duck, walking the red carpet alongside the Hollyoaks cast and crew.

== Filmography ==
=== Television ===
Year	Title	Role	Notes
2021	Hollyoaks IRL - Hollyoaks saved my life	Self	Channel 4
2021	Race Around Britain	Self	YouTube
2022	Gross Up - Episode 6	Self	E4
2023	Time For A Check-In	Self	Channel 4

== Radio ==
Year	Title	Role	Notes
2021	Hollyoaks suicide storyline 'saved my life'	Self	BBC Radio 5

== Awards and nominations ==
Year	Award	Category	Result
2021	National Diversity Awards	Positive Role Model (Gender)	Nominated

== External link ==
- Official Website
