= Helen Cunningham =

- Hollyoaks character
- Portrayed by: Kathryn George
- Duration: 1997–2004
- First appearance: 8 September 1997
- Last appearance: 20 February 2004
- Introduced by: Jo Hallows
In-universe information
- Sisters: Joan
- Husband: Dennis Richardson (divorced); Gordon Cunningham (1999–2004)
- Sons: Lewis Richardson; Tom Cunningham
- Daughters: Mandy Richardson
- Stepsons: Max Cunningham
- Grandsons: DJ
- Granddaughters: Grace Hutchinson; Ella Richardson; Steph Cunningham-Lomax

Helen Cunningham (also Richardson) is a fictional character from the British soap opera Hollyoaks, played by Kathryn George. The character debuted on-screen during the episode broadcast on 8 September 1997. Helen was centric to several storylines including her marriage with Gordon Cunningham (Bernard Latham), dealing with the suicide of her son Lewis Richardson (Ben Hull) and her daughter Mandy Richardson's (Sarah Jayne Dunn) abuse at the hands of her ex-husband, Dennis Richardson (David McAlister). Producers also created an advanced maternal age storyline for the character, where she becomes pregnant with Gordon's child and gives birth to Tom Cunningham (Ellis Hollins). In 2003, writers featured Helen in an infidelity story with Tony Hutchinson (Nick Pickard). Helen and Tony, who is younger engage in a sexual affair which nearly ruins her on-screen partnership with Gordon.

Despite being deemed a mainstay of the soap during her tenure, George was written out of Hollyoaks in 2004, following Latham's decision to quit the show. Helen and Gordon were killed off in a car crash story and Helen made her final appearance during the episode broadcast on 20 February 2004. Writers revisited the story in 2017, when the crash was revealed to have been caused by Milo Entwistle (Nathan Morris), who was then a new character in the series.

== Development ==
=== Characterisation and family ===
George joined the cast as Helen in 1997. She was introduced as the mother of Mandy Richardson (Sarah Jayne Dunn) and Lewis Richarsdon (Ben Hull). She is later introduced into the Cunningham family via her marriage to Gordon Cunningham (Bernard Latham), which have been described as a "respected local family". Helen's role in the show is a businesswoman, the owner of a laundrette called Steam Team. She is described on the show's official website as running her business "conscientiously, with quality being her watchword."

Helen is characterised as having a "family-orientated and good-natured personality". The Hollyoaks publicist noted her personality became "tarnished" by her infidelity storyline. Another called her "a long-standing and respected member of the community, fully behind any plans of civic renovation and other forward-thinking innovations from the local council." She is portrayed as fighting for the interests of others. Another writer from the website revealed "there were few others would could match Helen Cunningham when it came to fighting your corner and standing up for who and what you believed in." George told Allison Maund from Inside Soap that she admired Helen because she "has her family's interests at heart". She also liked Helen's "strength" of character displayed in her stories and believed that Helen "sees the good in people". George concluded despites these qualities, she would struggle to be friends with Helen had she been real, joking "I think I'd have to shake her".

Helen's early years in the show were fraught with trauma originating from her "terrible misfortune to be saddled with a family intent on ripping itself apart." Helen was married to Dennis Richardson (David McAlister), who sexually abuses their daughter, Mandy. Lewis begins mimicking his father's violent behaviour and becomes alcohol dependant. Production improved Helen's prospect via her relationship with Gordon. A show publicist described their relationship as a "very traditional and respectful kind". Writers originally portrayed the merging Richardson and Cunningham families displaying a "mutual distrust". They later overcome their concerns and form a new family unit in the show.

Producers created an advanced maternal age pregnancy storyline for Helen. The story was developed from Helen's romance with Gordon. Helen becomes pregnant with Gordon's child and he decides to ask Helen to marry him. Writers used their relationship to merge together the already established Richardson and Cunningham families. In the book, Phil Redmond's Hollyoaks: The Official Companion, author Matthew Evans stated that Gordon "has proved himself to be a rock for his wife, Helen." She gives birth to a boy, Tom Cunningham (later played by Ellis Hollins) by the side of a road. The scenes played out after Helen's daughter, Mandy attempts to take Helen to hospital in her car whilst she is in labour, despite not being able to drive. Mandy fails to get Helen to the hospital and is forced to pull over and deliver her mother's baby in the backseat of her car. Dunn told a Soaplife reporter that she enjoyed the challenge she and George had filming the storyline. She added that Mandy reacted well to the situation she and Helen face.

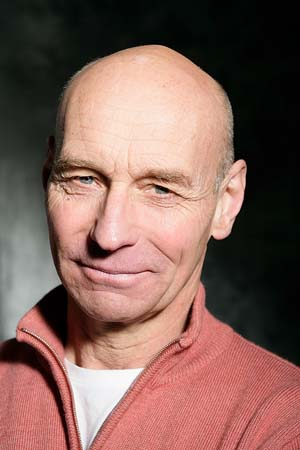
David McAlister plays Helen's abusive ex-husband, Dennis Richardson

Helen's son Lewis commits suicide. This damages her relationship with daughter Mandy. Dunn said having to film scenes where Helen and Mandy argue were "horrid". In scenes where Helen hits Mandy, Dunn said she trusted George enough to allow her to hit her "for real" as it would add to realism. George added that Dunn and herself "get on well" and added that if she had children she would "want a daughter just like Sarah".

In May 2003, producers decided to revisit Helen's stories with Dennis, which involved the domestic abuse she endured and the sexual abuse he inflicted on his own daughter. The story damaged the close mother/daughter relationship writers had previously developed between Helen and Mandy. Dennis was reintroduced into the show for the story, which plays out when he is released from prison. Mandy then discovers that Helen has remained in contact with Dennis via letters. Mandy discovers their letters and feels betrayed by Helen.

Dunn told Kathryn Secretan from Soaplife that Mandy is in disbelief by her mother's betrayal. She explained "Dennis used to physically abuse Helen, too, and Helen was as pleased as Mandy when he was put away. So Mandy can't understand why her mother would have been writing to him." Helen does offer an explanation to Mandy. Dunn opined that Helen's reasoning about contacting Dennis created some "emotional scenes". Helen explains that after Lewis' suicide, Dennis was the only person who could understand her grief and pain at losing their son. Mandy refuses to accept Helen's reasoning and their relationship is beyond repair. Dunn added that it causes a "major upset" and explained that Helen and Mandy had always shared a close on-screen relationship. She concluded that Helen's betrayal is "totally unforgiveable".

=== Inappropriate crush ===
In July 2002, writers created a new story for Helen which featured school boy Bombhead (Lee Otway) fall in love with her. His inappropriate crush develops after he attends the Jubilee celebration party where attendees wear period costumes. Bombhead accidentally sees Helen's underwear and becomes infatuated with her. Otway told Claire Brand from Inside Soap that Bombhead becomes convinced Helen has romantic feelings for him too and tries to get closer to her. He applies for a job at Helen's ironing business, Steam Team, believing "she fancies him" and will hire him. Helen offers Bombhead the job, but he believes she has done so to initiate a romantic affair. Otway revealed "he wants to be around her all the time and is convinced she feels the same way."

Mandy realises that Bombhead is in love with Helen and warns her mother about his true intentions. Helen is shocked and invites Bombhead to lunch. Otway added that "Bombhead is convinced that Helen wants to tell him that she loves him." When they meet up, Helen tells Bombhead he can no longer work at Steam Team due to his lack of experience. He refuses to believe her and "takes this completely the wrong way" due to a conversation "filled with innuendo". Helen becomes annoyed with Bombhead's refusal to accept reality and tries to be more direct, but he continues his infatuation. Otway explained that Bombhead becomes convinced Helen is "playing hard to get" and is worried about leaving her husband, Gordon. He added that Bombhead is not deterred by Helen's marriage and "was convinced her family weren't a problem". Helen is left with the dilemma of trying to stop Bombhead from pursuing her further. Otway revealed that he enjoyed working on the storyline with George and Latham because they were "both fantastic" during the story.

=== Affair with Tony Hutchinson ===
In 2003, producers created an infidelity storyline for Helen with a younger man, Tony Hutchinson (Nick Pickard). Writers portrayed Helen becoming more business oriented in the lead up to the affair. Helen owns a laundrette called "Steam Team" and wants to make it successful. Helen's husband, Gordon is reluctant to allow her to thrive. He wants to concentrate on their shop, Drive n Buy and keep her at home doing chores. George told Sarah Ellis Inside Soap that "Helen really wants to make a go of the laundrette, but Gordon's not supportive, he just wants her at his beck and call." Writers added a further rift between Helen and Gordon when he betrays her confidence. Helen learns that her abusive ex-husband, Dennis is being released from prison. Dennis sexually abused their daughter, Mandy. She wants to prevent Mandy from finding out, but Gordon tells his son Max Cunningham (Matt Littler). Helen feels betrayed by Gordon and pushed into telling Mandy about Dennis.

George explained that "Gordon has betrayed her trust" and she shares her woes with Tony. Helen and Tony then share a kiss and he realises his attraction to her. George told Ellis that Tony "thinks the world of Helen" and "the kiss is an escape from the drudgery of her day-to-day life - it's a bit of a girly moment." George believed that Helen instantly realises she has done the wrong thing. She is "flattered" by Tony's obvious romantic feelings but feels guilty. She added that Helen and Gordon both has "disastrous first marriages" and their union is a "another shot at happiness". George was delighted with the storyline. She branded it "great". The story allowed for writers to her Helen more "glammed up", which made George feel "like a film star".

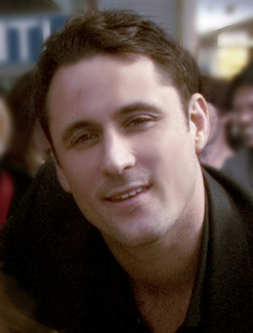
Nick Pickard plays Helen's love interest, Tony Hutchinson

As the story progressed, writers embroiled the two characters in a sexual affair. Helen is portrayed with a guilty conscience but Gordon encourages Helen to spend time with Tony. She helps him move house and after an argument with Gordon, Helen goes to a hotel with Tony and gets drunk. They then have sex but Tony regrets it after, whilst Helen is basking. Picard told an Inside Soap reporter that the Cunningham marriage "hit a rocky patch" and Helen has "opened her heart to him". He added that "Helen is like the cat who got the cream, but Tony is fighting a moral dilemma." Picard added the it was "great" creating the storyline with George. Though they found it "quite embarrassing" to film their character's kissing scenes. He concluded that they managed to overcome their embarrassment eventually. Pickard later recalled that the storyline "shocked" him. Pickard added that his character was "going out with the old lady at the moment". Pickard added that he "gets on well with Kathryn" but that it was "weird when you suddenly have to be necking her". Pickard added that they "just got on with it" although it was "embarrassing when there's a cut and you don't really know what to say to each other".

In March 2003, writers continued the plot with the reveal of their affair to other characters. First O.B. (Darren Jeffries) discovers their infidelity and then tells Max. This causes a physical fight between Max and Tony. From this, Max decides to tell Gordon the truth about Helen and Tony. The affair reveal allowed writers to divide the Cunningham / Richardson family. Gordon blames Max for initially agreeing to keep Helen's secret. Mandy decides to defend her mother and Tony has betrayed the entire family. Latham told Andy Baker (Inside Soap) that the storyline leaves Gordon isolated with no one to talk to and is "gutted". He explained that Gordon did not suspect Helen was betraying him. He believed Gordon's naivety came from him being a "simple soul", to the extent he presumed Helen was "going through the menopause or a mid-life crisis". He added that Gordon's first marriage ended because of infidelity, but this time it is "harder" because "Helen is the love of his life". In another interview, Latham added "when he finds out he really does suffer a nervous breakdown." The betrayal is worsened by the fact Gordon nominated Tony for the "Entrepreneur of the Year Award", which he wins. Gordon is tasked with publicly awarding Tony and decides to keep his knowledge of their betrayal a secret until after the ceremony. In a story twist, Helen decides to leave Gordon for Tony. Latham explained that Gordon is convinced Helen will reconcile with him and is willing to try. He added that he was "very sad" when he discovered Helen would leave his on-screen counterpart. Latham was protective of Helen and Gordon's relationship and wanted it to continue. He concluded "I hope the two of them can make a go of things again, and I'm keeping my fingers crossed." Writers later reunited Helen and Gordon, who got their relationship back on good terms. Latham later assessed that Helen's affair ruined Gordon's character and branded it the worst storyline he was featured in.

=== Car crash and departure ===
In 2004, both Helen and Gordon were written out of Hollyoaks and killed off in a car crash story. Their departures were created because Latham chose to leave the series to spend more time with his family. Latham's departure from the series and Gordon being killed off were announced prior to the episode's broadcast. Helen's death was kept a secret from viewers and not included in advance spoilers printed in magazines such as Soaplife and Inside Soap. In the episodes leading to the crash, Helen has to contend with Gordon's failing health. He suffers a heart-attack and survives, but the ordeal forces him to reassess his life. Gordon decides to run for the position of local mayor. He also wants to repair his relationship with Helen and they agree to go on a cruise. Helen and Gordon drive back from hospital and are involved in a serious car accident. Latham told Inside Soap's Ellis that "when Gordon and Helen leave hospital it's the happiest and closest they've been for a long time" but "less than 15 minutes later, their whole world is in tatters again."

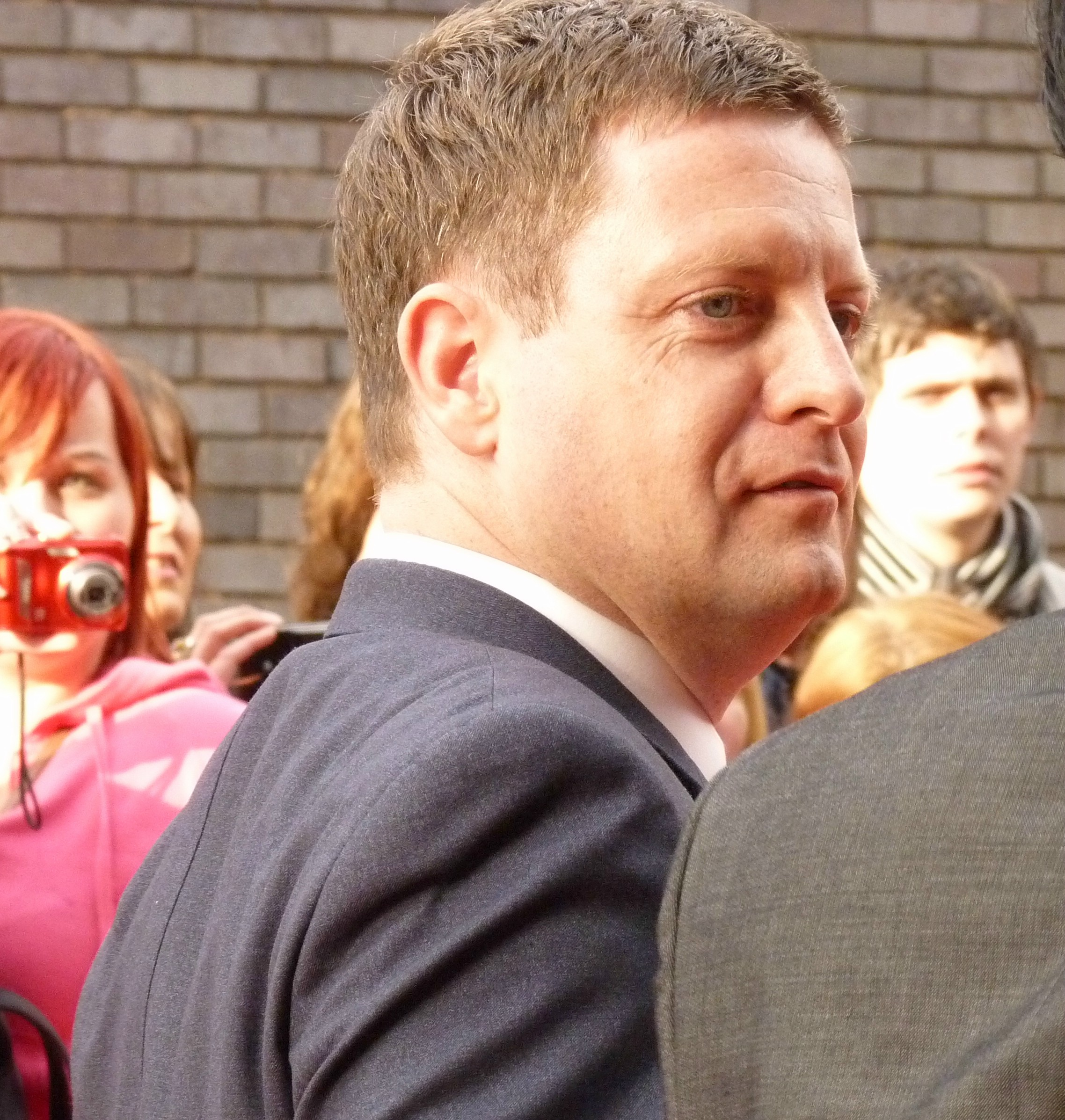
The show's executive producer, Bryan Kirkwood, revisited Helen and Gordon's crash storyline in 2017.

Writers played on shock value from the crash story. When their relatives learn of the crash, they rush to the hospital. There they learn that Gordon has died but Helen is in a stable condition. Littler, who plays Helen's step-son Max told an Inside Soap reporter that Mandy has to tell Helen about Gordon's death. He described the scenes as "awful" and Max decides to dedicate himself to looking after Helen and Tom. Littler explained that with Gordon's death, he feels a responsibility to help Helen overcome their loss. Littler continued that Max soon becomes worried about Helen's health, but in turn she is more worried about her family. Max also worries that his family will fall apart without Gordon. Helen reassures Max that even without Gordon, they will remain a family unit despite not being biologically related. Writers continued to play on shock value when they killed Helen off in surprise scenes. Her sudden death is caused by her injuries from the crash which went unnoticed. Littler added "what happens next will tear the family apart even more." Both Helen and Gordon received a joint funeral which was broadcast on 27 February 2004.

In 2017, producers created a heritage storyline which further explored previously unknown details of Helen and Gordon's crash. A new character introduced into the series, Milo Entwistle (Nathan Morris), is revealed to be the culprit who caused the fatal crash. A flashback scene featuring Helen's crash was created for the episode to reveal his identity. The flashback scenes used new footage, intercut with the original footage broadcast in Helen and Gordon's crash. Morris revealed that Hollyoaks' executive producer Bryan Kirkwood created the story. He showed Morris footage of Helen's crash and informed him that Milo was responsible for causing the accident. Morris added that Helen and Gordon were still partly responsible for the crash. In 2020, producers further paid tribute to the characters with a commemorative memorial plaque inscribed with Helen and Gordon's name, which was installed on-set of a new market.

== Storylines ==
Helen has a tough time whilst being married to Dennis, who had been abusive to her and had repeatedly raped their daughter Mandy. Helen is unaware of this until Mandy confesses to her brother Lewis. After Dennis is sent to prison for seven years, Helen finds a new love interest in Gordon. The pair have sex and Helen is shocked to realise that she is pregnant. They soon got married and Helen gives birth to baby Tom, but tragedy strikes when she finds out Lewis has attempted suicide and is slowly dying, leaving Helen devastated and struggling to cope. Due to Lewis's death, the relationship between Helen and Mandy falls apart and the pair barely speak to each other. After a while, the pair begin to rebuild their relationship. Helen then enjoys a period of happiness running the ironing and cleaning business 'Steam Team' next door to Gordon's Drive 'n' Buy whilst raising Tom. Then suddenly, for reasons best known to herself, Helen becomes restless: her shop changes its identity, and so does she, indulging in an affair with Tony, Gordon's friend. This is eventually exposed when an earthquake destroys the barge the lovesick pair had chosen as a bolt hole. After many arguments, Tony tells Helen that he does not want to be with her anymore and that she should get back with Gordon for Tom and Mandy's sake. Helen takes Tony's advice and she and Gordon fully reconcile.

Helen begins to regain the respect of Mandy and stepson Max, but soon things become rocky ground for her when Gordon has a death scare and has a heart attack. Helen blames herself, but Max supports her and Gordon seems to recover. However a week later, Gordon, Helen and Tom are involved in a car crash that leaves Gordon dead after he suffers another heart attack. Helen is devastated and although she returns home from the hospital, she later dies in her sleep whilst sitting in a chair with a blanket over her legs, leaving Tom an orphan. According to Helen's will, Tom was supposed to stay with Mandy. He then lives with his brother Max for four years until Max dies when he was run over on his wedding day, and his widow wife Steph Dean (Carley Stenson) begins to take care of Tom until her death in 2010. In 2018, the Cunninghams and Mandy discover that Milo Entwistle (Nathan Morris) is responsible for the deaths of Gordon and Helen.

== Reception ==
At the 2002 Inside Soap Awards, Helen and Gordon were nominated for Best Couple. The aftermath of their deaths received a nomination for Best Storyline in 2004. Daniel Kilkelly from Digital Spy branded Helen and Gordon's crash "such a classic moment in Hollyoaks history". A reporter from Soaplife branded it a "must see" episode, featuring "devastating news which unites the community in grief." Justin Harp added Helen and Gordon are "classic characters" who were deemed mainstays of Hollyoaks prior to the pair being "notoriously killed off". Jessica Gibb of Daily Mirror branded Helen and Gordon "iconic characters". Rhodri Owen of the Western Mail observed that "viewers watched in tears" as both Helen and Gordon exited the serial. In 2017, Inside Soap's Laura Heffernan branded Helen and Gordon a "much-loved couple" and their final moments "tragic". She added that the flashback sequence "dramatic" and "shock revelation". Merle Brown from Daily Record expressed her shock at Helen's later-in-life pregnancy storyline, stating that upon viewing it could "knock me down with a feather".

A Soaplife reporter criticised the story featuring Helen keeping in contact with Dennis in prison. They scathed "He may have beaten her black and blue and ultimately raped their own daughter, but Helen clearly has her own twisted take on standing by your man." Nick Foley from Liverpool Daily Post called the character a "temptress". In a feature compiled by Soaplife, writers noted a soap opera trope that female characters who have "toyboy lovers" always resulted in tragedy. They included Helen and Tony's affair, noting the "curse" struck when Helen was killed off the following year. They gave the story a 1 out of 5 for the plot's "explosive rating". An Inside Soap writer expressed that Helen and Tony were "Hollyoaks' most unlikely couple". Their colleague Sarah Ellis assessed that Helen is a "mild-mannered businesswoman". She branded Helen's affair with Tony as a "racy plot" and opined "many people think that Helen has the patience of a saint to put up with loudmouth hubby, Gordon." Another Inside Soap columnist criticised the storyline stating "we're seriously questioning the scriptwriters' sanity" that Tony was having a "passionate tryst" with Helen. They believed a married woman like Helen "should surely know better" than to have an affair. Another praised Hollyoaks' return to a good "standard" in August 2002 due to story changes. They praised Helen's story with Bombhead, stating "we have loved Bombhead's hilarious crush on Helen." In response to Helen and Gordon being killed off, Sam Soap from Inside Soap thought it was "great" and wished that producers had also killed off the entire Cunningham family because of their "grumpy faces". Another writer from Inside Soap included Helen in a list of "top five Hollyoaks blonde" characters. They stated that "well, she was a man (and boy) magnet, wasn't she? Ask Bombhead."
