= Tony Hutchinson =

Fictional character from Hollyoaks

- Hollyoaks character
- Portrayed by: Nick Pickard
- Duration: 1995–present
- First appearance: 23 October 1995
- Created by: Phil Redmond
- Introduced by: Phil Redmond
- Spin-off appearances: Hollyoaks: Movin' On (2001); Hollyoaks Later (2009, 2013, 2020)
- Crossover appearances: Brookside (2025)
In-universe information
- Occupation: Businessman; Chef; Spa manager; Café manager; Taxi driver; Club owner; Pub landlord
- Father: Edward Hutchinson
- Mother: Victoria Hutchinson
- Stepfather: Rory Finnigan
- Half-brothers: Dominic Reilly; Eric Foster
- Half-sisters: Verity Hutchinson; Eva Hutchinson
- Wife: Mandy Richardson (2005–2006); Cindy Cunningham (2009–2010, 2012–2013); Diane O'Connor (2014–2024, 2025–2026)
- Sons: Beau Ramsey; Harry Thompson; Anthony Hutchinson; Ro Hutchinson
- Daughters: Grace Hutchinson; Morgan Osborne
- Adoptive daughters: Dee Dee Hutchinson; Eva Hutchinson
- Stepdaughters: Holly Cunningham; Eva Hutchinson; Sinead O'Connor
- Grandsons: Isaac Thompson
- First cousins: Dominic Reilly

Tony Hutchinson is a fictional character from the British Channel 4 soap opera Hollyoaks, played by Nick Pickard. His first appearance occurred on 23 October 1995, the inaugural episode of the programme, and is the longest-serving character in the soap. The character was created by Phil Redmond, as one of several main characters for the show. For his portrayal of Tony, Pickard won the British Soap Award for Outstanding Achievement at the 2017 British Soap Awards.

Tony has been part of various storylines, including marriages to Mandy Richardson (Sarah Jayne Dunn), her stepsister Cindy Cunningham (Stephanie Waring) and Diane O'Connor (Alex Fletcher), an affair with married woman Helen Cunningham (Kathryn George), the death of his daughter Grace Hutchinson to sudden infant death syndrome, the discovery of his long-lost son Harry Thompson (Parry Glasspool), sleeping with underage Theresa McQueen (Jorgie Porter), his battle with testicular cancer, impregnating Diane, the birth of his children Anthony and Dee Dee Hutchinson, an affair with his stepdaughter Sinead O'Connor (Stephanie Davis), discovering that his biological daughter is Rose Lomax after she and Dee Dee were switched at birth, coping with Harry's homosexuality and relationship with his best friend Ste Hay (Kieron Richardson), being stabbed and taken hostage by serial killer Breda McQueen (Moya Brady) after he discovered her crimes, struggling to return to his life after Breda's reign of terror comes to an end, the return of his father Edward Hutchinson (Joe McGann) into his life, coming over his trauma from Breda's actions, discovering that Diane had a brief affair when he was taken hostage and discovering it was with Edward. During the 30th anniversary Tony was shot by an unknown person later revealed to be Mercedes McQueen (Jennifer Metcalfe) the same episode Hollyoaks was crossing over with Brookside.

== Creation ==
Tony is one of the original Hollyoaks characters introduced by Phil Redmond during 1995 after the creation of the soap opera. Pickard is the longest serving cast member in the serial's history having played Tony since the show began in 1995. Pickard was cast in the role when he was nineteen years old and he relocated to Liverpool where the serial is filmed. He has said that his character gets a balance of serious and humorous storyline which he enjoys. In 2009, the Daily Star reported that Pickard had quit the role and was "disgusted" with series producer Paul Marquess following the axing of his real life brother John Pickard as Dom Reilly. Pickard later announced that he had no plans to leave the serial.

== Development ==
=== Characterisation ===
Tony was originally described as a "loveable geek and the sort of guy who would instantly and completely fall in love". He is described as the "oldest friend" of Kurt Benson (Jeremy Edwards) and "the anithesis of Kurt, sensitive and keen to settle down, Tony lacked Kurt's confidence with women". An early official Hollyoaks' website, Hollyoaks.com, described Tony as "A worrier, who lacks self-confidence but always does the decent thing". A more recent official Hollyoaks website describes Tony saying: "Tony has had what you would call "a colourful life". Quite the Romeo, he has been married TWICE. [...] On top of that there's been numerous engagements, romances and flings [...] A natural-born entrepreneur, he has built (and lost) a business empire that would make Sir Alan [Sugar] proud, encompassing burger bars, launderettes, health spas and restaurants [...] He may be down but he's certainly not out. NEVER underestimate the Hutch".

Virgin Media profiled Tony, of his persona they state: "Pompous and irritating at times, Tony has also provided plenty of slapstick." They also comment on his relationships, writing: "After inexplicably romancing some of the numerous blondes in the series, Tony's suffered enough personal tragedy to garner some sympathy." What's on TV also profiled Tony stating: "The entrepreneur is a bit of a fuddy-duddy but he has never had any problems in the romance department. He must be the most fertile man in the village as he's got five women pregnant so far!"

=== Relationships ===
==== Early relationships ====
Tony and Julie Matthews (Julie Buckfield) begin a relationship. The pair soon after become engaged. Explaining how Tony feels on his wedding day, Pickard said "Tony has a lot of nerves about the whole thing". He explained that this is due to Julie's parents taking over organising the wedding and because Julie has become an "absolute superbitch" in the lead up to the wedding making Tony feel "unsure" about the wedding.

Tony and Ruth Osborne (Terri Dwyer) have a brief relationship before Ruth leaves Hollyoaks village. A few years later Ruth returns and tells Tony that she had become pregnant with his child but while away suffered a miscarriage. Dwyer felt Ruth didn't return to reunite with Tony but upon her return Ruth realised "she still cared" for Tony. Dwyer explained that Tony's girlfriend, Mandy Richardson (Sarah Jayne Dunn), begins to feel jealous when Ruth and Tony spend time together. Mandy deliberately stands Tony up, leaving him alone with Ruth but "Tony doesn't do anything because he loves Mandy". Upon Tony discovering what Mandy has done he can't believe her lack of trust in him and begins to "wonder whether their relationship is as good as he thinks it is". Dwyer said that Tony feels "vulnerable" so Ruth "goes in for the kill". Ruth and Tony sleep together leaving Tony feeling guilty.

==== Mandy Richardson ====
Tony and Mandy begin a relationship. Dunn said that when she was first informed of the storyline she was surprised. She added that although she felt the pairing was unlikely, "it did actually work". The pair marry and later have a child who they name Grace. Grace dies from suspected SIDS and the pair split. Pickard said "If they hadn't lost a child, they might have stayed together the first time round. They were really happy before that happened". Dunn said that the storyline worked well, saying "as much as it was really difficult. By that stage, Nick and I both knew how we would play things and it worked". Tony leaves Hollyoaks with Mandy and her daughter. Tony returns three months later without Mandy. Dunn explained the reason for Tony leaving Mandy saying: "Mandy told Tony she couldn't have more children and he freaked out and left her in Laos". Dunn revealed Mandy wanted revenge for this. In 2011 Tony leaves the village and returns three months later having reinvented himself. Pickard said despite Tony's changes "Tony is still the same person and he loves Mandy". Speaking about the couple's future, Dunn told Taryn Davies of Femalefirst: "they've been on and off for years and they're a great couple and I think that they make a great couple and I think it's such a shame that just as they get happy something horrendous happens again. So there's the possibility that their relationship might be re-kindled".

==== Jacqui McQueen ====
Tony's relationship with Jacqui McQueen (Claire Cooper) was often strained by Jacqui's desire for children. Tony and Jacqui agree to adopt. Pickard commented that adoption is "not something [Tony] even considered until Jacqui suggested it. Now he’s really into it though. They were both heartbroken when she lost the baby and found out she can never have children. Adoption could give them the family they desperately want". Pickard explained that the couple love each other and do not "necessarily" need a child to seal their relationship but they want to begin a family together. Pickard stated that despite Jacqui's past, his character "sees some very good qualities in her". The actor revealed that Tony tries to stay positive that the couple will be able to adopt despite Jacqui's criminal record. When the couple are told they can not adopt, Pickard said they are "devastated". He went on to add that the couple's desire for children is "very strong" so they may go down other routes such as surrogacy. When questioned if Jacqui is the one for Tony, his portrayer stated: "He's committed to her and wants them to be together. They have a connection even though they’re constantly splitting up and getting back together. Jacqui could well be his Mrs Right at last". Pickard teased that "maybe [Tony] already has a child – or maybe he’ll get someone pregnant by accident..." He went on to add that "even by soap standards, Tony's had shocking luck".

Tony and Jacqui's sister, Mercedes McQueen (Jennifer Metcalfe), have sex. Metcalfe revealed the pair are "appalled" and can't believe what has happened when they wake up. Metcalfe said that the pair don't like each other. Mercedes discovers she is pregnant with Tony's child. Mercedes feels like Tony has "the right to know" she is expecting his child. Metcalfe explained that Tony is "horrified! He can't get his head round the idea that she's pregnant with his child". Mercedes considers giving her baby to Jacqui but does not tell her Tony is the father. Mercedes decides not to go through with giving Jacqui her baby, which her portrayer explained saying: "She decides not to give Jacqui the baby even though Jacqui wants it. Mercedes can't cope with the fact that the baby's Tony's". She went on to add that Mercedes would keep the baby herself but because it is Tony's baby and because of "all the baggage that comes with that" Mercedes decides to terminate the pregnancy. Metcalfe revealed that if Jacqui discovered Tony is the father of the baby Mercedes terminated then she would "go a bit psycho".

In one storyline Jacqui's sister Tina McQueen (Leah Hackett) agrees to be a surrogate mother for her child. The storyline was included to help house many lies and secrets that had previously been built up prior, including Tony's affair with Mercedes and Tina's affair with Russ Owen (Stuart Manning), of which series producer Bryan Kirkwood stated there was "there's so much ammunition in store", which would eventually devastate Jacqui and Tony. Kirkwood also devised the plot to show of Pickard's skills in playing tragedy, of this he commented: "It'll also give Claire Cooper and Nick Pickard another opportunity to show off their acting talents. Tony and Jacqui are one of those couples that we can have fun with - but also will blow the audience away when dealing with tragedy". Pickard felt the relationship ended because "There have been so many lies and so much deceit throughout their relationship that I think Tony and Jacqui have reached burn-out as a couple. I think he still loves her. That hasn't just gone away".

Tony meets Theresa McQueen (Jorgie Porter) on a night out at The Loft. Tony, unaware Theresa is fifteen years old and Jacqui's cousin, has sex with Theresa. Pickard said that upon Jacqui discovering Tony's one-night stand with Theresa she "storms round and starts thwacking him, screaming he's slept with her 15-year-old cousin! What's worse is that Theresa is making out Tony practically raped her". Pickard explained that Theresa wants a relationship with Tony but Tony tells her a relationship won't happen. Pickard explained that Tony is arrested and "his life goes into freefall". Pickard went on to say that if "he's found guilty then he'll probably have to do time. If he's let off, I think the best thing would be for him to go away for a while to sort himself out".

In a later storyline Tony announces his intentions to marry Cindy Cunningham (Stephanie Waring), prompting Jacqui to try and talk Tony out of it. Cooper has stated that she believes that her character is meant to be with Tony because "he is the love of Jacqui's life" and that hearing their engagement makes Jacqui feel like she "has a knife in her back". Cooper also hopes one day that the pair will reunite stating: "Jacqui needs to move on right now, but ultimately I'd prefer the story to come full circle and lead back to Tony". Cooper also revealed that at the time she was often approached by fans asking her when the couple would reconcile. Pickard felt that Cindy was right for Tony but believed Jacqui to be the love of Tony's life.

==== Cindy Cunningham ====
Cindy grow close and begin a relationship. Stephanie Waring, who portrays Cindy, said the pair "bring out the best in each other". Pickard explained that when Cindy ends the relationship because he does not plan to marry her, his character is shocked that he "misses Cindy. They talk things through and, out of the blue, Tony proposes in jest. But Cindy goes along with it..." He explained that Tony is unaware of Cindy's true nature although he did suspect Cindy to be manipulating him for a while. Pickard added that Cindy will "want to get married as soon as possible before Tony can change his mind". He added that Cindy is "acting like she genuinely loves him and he desperately wants that love" so he remains unsuspicious towards her and her plans to scam him. Despite her plans, Pickard felt Cindy has "some feelings" for Tony. He felt that Tony has "fallen for her, yes. It surprises him but she's started to mean a lot to him. Cindy's smart and sexy and they're good together". Pickard felt that if his character discovered Cindy and Darren Osborne's (Ashley Taylor Dawson) plans to scam him he would be "furious but also he'd be really down about it. It would upset him to think they were trying to con him but he'd be angry with himself for being so gullible". He added that "Tony thinks [Cindy would] never have agreed to marry him if Darren still meant something to her".

Pickard explained Tony's reason for marrying Cindy saying: "he’s looking forward to someone not so much to fall in love with, but for more practical reasons – so he lets himself be swept off his feet by Cindy". Shortly before the wedding Tony becomes intoxicated and has sex with a woman who Darren has paid. Tony admits this to Cindy who in turn admits she and Darren had been planning to scam Tony. Waring said Tony has "been a good man telling the truth and Cindy takes that as her opportunity to tell him the truth. All the cards are on the table". Pickard said he was "surprised that Tony would go through with it because of their volatile relationship and the fact that Tony knows Cindy's into Darren. I think he wanted to just go for it with her, and hopefully it'll work out for him". Pickard later stated that he didn't think Cindy was right for Tony stating: "I don't think she's the one for him, to be honest". Tony meets Gabby Sharpe (Phina Oruche) which allows him to realise "his marriage is over and he intends to tell Cindy that as soon as he gets home".

==== Gabby Sharpe ====
Series producer Paul Marquess said that Tony's relationship with Gabby "redefines Tony as one of the older characters". He explained that the audience would soon "feel we're seeing Tony in a different context". Tony helps Gabby when she is run over. Pickard revealed that "It's love at first sight for Tony" when sees Gabby. On how the characters meet, Oruche explained: "She's walking down the street minding her own business. She comes across Tony, he looks at her and says something to her but she doesn't answer him. He thinks she's rude [...] She gets hit by a car [... and] he then helps her. She's a woman lying in the gutter so he helps her. [...] he comes to the hospital to meet my children [...] Basically I have no help and I'm unconscious so he has to help me..." Pickard added that Gabby asks him to look after her children, Taylor (Shaun Blackstock) and Amber (Lydia Lloyd-Henry), which he takes as an indication she may feel the same. Oruche explained that while her character is hospitalised Tony and Gabby are "getting used to spending time with each other". Pickard revealed that Tony would become "embroiled in the drama of [Gabby's] life". Tony discovers Gabby, like Tony, is married but "like Tony, she's not happy". Pickard revealed that when Gabby's husband, Phil (Andonis Anthony), returns Gabby will be too scared to leave him for Tony. Oruche also spoke of Phil's return, saying that Gabby and Tony "want to spend their lives together but like I said the husband comes back. She's not in any fit state to go through separating with somebody". Tony and Gabby have a brief relationship before she leaves Hollyoaks village.

== Storylines ==
Tony begins a relationship with Julie. Julie and Tony become engaged but she leaves him at the altar. Tony and Tessie Thompson (Sian Foulkes) begin a relationship. Tessie pretends she is pregnant in an attempt to scam Tony of his money. Tony discovers Tessie's lies forcing her to leave. Tony's friend, Rory "Finn" Finnigan (James Redmond), begins a relationship with a woman named Victoria (Fiona Mollison) who he later discovers is Tony's mother. The pair soon after marry despite Tony's protests. Tony buys Lewis Richardson's (Ben Hull) share of The Loft. Tony moves away from Hollyoaks Village with Ruth and Finn, where he focuses on his new business venture Gnosh, in Hollyoaks: Movin' On. He receives news that Ruth has been beaten up by Lewis, who then commits suicide due to guilt over his actions. Tony has a brief relationship with Ruth before she leaves the village. Off-screen, Ruth discovers she is pregnant with Tony's child but suffers a miscarriage.

Tony moves back to Hollyoaks Village. Tony begins dating Izzy Cornwell (Elize du Toit). Tony buys Gnosh Village. Julie returns to Hollyoaks and Tony offers her a job at Gnosh Village. Izzy suggests to Tony that they get married, which Tony agrees to. Tony has sex with Julie and asks her to marry him, which she accepts. Tony makes Julie and Izzy promise to keep their engagements a secret. Discovering they are both engaged to Tony, they end their relationships with him. Tony realises he loves Julie and asks her to stay, however she reveals she only wanted him so she could steal his money as she has a boyfriend in prison. Tony supports Lewis's mother Helen Cunningham (Kathryn George), who is having a marital crisis. The pair begin an affair. Tony begins living with the Cunningham family but moves out after the affair is revealed to Helen's husband Gordon Cunningham (Bernard Latham).

Tony supports Helen's daughter Mandy Richardson (Sarah Jayne Dunn) through her abusive father's death, leading the pair to begin a relationship. The pair cheat on each other; Tony and Ruth have sex upon her return after she tells Tony about her miscarriage while Mandy has sex with Ben Davies (Marcus Patric). Ruth soon after leaves Hollyoaks Village. Mandy becomes pregnant with Tony's child but has a miscarriage. In anger, Mandy hits Tony, who hits her back. Mandy admits to abusing Tony after he is arrested. The pair seek counselling and leave for Rome, where they marry. Mandy becomes pregnant and gives birth to Grace Hutchinson. However, Grace dies from suspected sudden infant death syndrome. Tony struggles to accept Grace's death and blames others. Tony turns to alcohol, which pushes Mandy away. Tony's cousin, Dominic Reilly (John Pickard) arrives in Hollyoaks Village where he informs Tony that he has recently discovered that they are half-brothers. Mandy has sex with Dom. Tony begins counselling, however Mandy leaves him.

Tony begins a relationship with Jacqui McQueen. Due to Jacqui's fake marriage to Aleksander Malota (Jon Lolis), the relationship remains secret. Jacqui tells Tony that she is pregnant but she soon after she miscarries. Aleksander then leaves for Albania. Jacqui is arrested for shoplifting. Tony tells Jacqui he loves her. Tony and Jacqui decide to adopt a child, however due to Jacqui's criminal record the social services tell they won't be able to adopt. Tony turns 30 years old and Jacqui's half-sister, Tina (Leah Hackett), throws him a surprise party. Tina invites everyone in his address book. Tony's ex-fiancées, Julie, Izzy and Tessie arrive. Julie is sent away by Tony after she attempts to make amends. Tessie reveals she lied about not being pregnant and had Tony's child, an eight-year-old son called Harry Thompson (Daniel Seymour/Harrison George Rhodes). Jacqui grows jealous and forces Tony to choose between her and Harry, which results in him choosing Harry. An intoxicated Tony has sex with Jacqui's sister, Mercedes, who falls pregnant by him. Tony and Jacqui reconcile. Mercedes has an abortion, despite Jacqui's attempts to convince Mercedes to allow Tony and herself to raise the baby, unaware Tony is the father. Tina agrees to be a surrogate mother but later has sex with Russ, Mercedes' husband. She inseminates herself with Tony's sperm and later discovers she is pregnant. Tina gives birth to Max (Brayden Haynes-Mawdsley). Tina decides to raise Max as her own son, leaving Tony and Jacqui devastated. Tony discovers Russ is Max's father. Tina dies and when Jacqui finds out about Tony's one-night stand with Mercedes, Jacqui ends her relationship with Tony, who had planned to propose.

Tony meets Jacqui's cousin, Theresa at The Loft. Tony takes Theresa back to his flat, where they have sex. Theresa develops feelings for Tony and soon reveals she is fifteen years old. Tony tells her not contact him further. Jacqui discovers that they had sex and hits Tony before calling him a paedophile. When arrested, Tony lies to the police that nothing happened between him and Theresa. A witness tells the police that Tony bought Theresa several drinks, they then charge Tony for having sexual activity with children. Tony becomes paranoid, thinking everyone is talking about him. Tony has sex with Mandy. Jacqui apologise to Tony after the charges are dropped and Theresa admits she never told him her age. Tony then leaves Hollyoaks Village with Mandy and her daughter Ella after her affair with Warren Fox (Jamie Lomas) is revealed at his wedding. Tony returns without Mandy. Harry begins visiting Tony. When Russ takes Max, Tony agrees to hire a private investigator for Jacqui who then leaves to find Max.

Tony grows close to Cindy. The pair have sex and soon after begin a relationship. When Jacqui returns, she is horrified to find out about Tony and Cindy's relationship. Tony decides to take Cindy and her daughter, Holly (Lydia Waters), on holiday, however decides not to when Holly hints that Cindy wants to get married. Dom then taunts Cindy about Tony finally seeing her true colours. Cindy is comforted by Darren in her flat. The pair kiss which Tony witnesses. Cindy and Tony reunite and later become engaged, but Tony reveals to Dom that he does not really love Cindy. Cindy, Tony, Dom, Darren and Cindy's friend Savannah (Nicola Stapleton) go to a hotel for the wedding. Darren pays a woman to seduce Tony before he has Tony left naked at a farm. Tony is found and confesses to having sex with another woman to Cindy, who then reveals she and Darren had planned to scam him. Cindy and Tony then agree to get married, which they do despite interruptions by Darren and Jacqui.

Tony and Cindy discuss sending Holly to a boarding school. Holly overhears the conversation and is upset, blaming Tony for trying to get rid of her. Holly taunts Tony who grabs her, causing her to run away. Cindy blames Tony for her disappearance. However, she is eventually found. To stop their marriage ending, Tony and Cindy decide to move away from Hollyoaks Village. Tony cares for Gabby Sharpe while she is in hospital. Tony realises he does not love Cindy, so ends their marriage. They soon after divorce. Gabby's son, Taylor, admits to Tony that Gabby's husband, Phil (Andonis Anthony), has another family which he has kept secret from Gabby. Tony tells Gabby who tells Tony she loves him.

Mandy returns to the village and is angry at Tony for leaving her in Laos. With Warren's help, she plots revenge. Tony tells Dom he is in financial trouble. Dom vows to help his brother and asks Warren for a loan. Il Gnosh is set on fire and the fire spreads to Tony's flat. Tony's friend Steph Roach (Carley Stenson) is killed along with Mercedes' husband, Malachy Fisher (Glen Wallace). Tony is initially accused of starting the fire for insurance but Dom confesses he started the fire to destroy his laptop and to gain Tony insurance money. Tony discovers this and calls the police, who arrest Dom.

Tony opens a new Spa. He sells the spa to Cindy but remains manager. He is replaced by Mandy who once again returns to the village. Tony leaves Hollyoaks Village to go travelling after Gabby, who has previously left Hollyoaks Village, tells Tony that she is not coming back. Tony and Mandy reunite upon his return. Mandy leaves soon after, telling Tony through a note that the relationship is over. Tony becomes the manager of a new cafe in the village called College Coffee and gives Cindy a job and a place to stay when she becomes bankrupt. Tony and Cindy later reunite. Tony believes Cindy is pregnant so asks her to marry him. Cindy declines and is later angered when she discovers he only asked her because he thought she was pregnant. Tony buys Attwell's gym for them. Cindy later asks Tony to marry her and he accepts. Tony is involved in a car accident and becomes temporarily blind. He is told he will soon regain his sight. When Tony regains his sight he witnesses Cindy kissing Rhys Ashworth (Andrew Moss). Cindy is unaware he witnessed the kiss. Tony plans to expose her affair but goes through with the wedding. At the wedding reception, Tony witnesses Cindy planning to leave with Rhys. Maddie Morrison (Scarlett Bowman) crashes in to the wedding venue. Rhys is killed and Tony comforts Jacqui and Cindy.

Jacqui then discovers that Rhys and Cindy had an affair and attacks Cindy causing her to go to hospital. Jacqui then drags Cindy to Rhys's grave where she attacks her and Cindy turns to Tony for comfort. Tony refuses to help Cindy, however, and makes it clear that he is on Jacqui's side. Jacqui is about to turn herself in to the police for the attack although Tony stops her. Tony and Jacqui then begin a relationship and Tony tells Cindy that if she reports Jacqui to the police then he will make her homeless. He then files for divorce. Jacqui then discovers that Tony knew about Rhys and Cindy's affair yet did not do anything so she breaks up with him. Jacqui becomes stressed when she is told to sell illegal vodka by her criminal boss, Trudy Ryan (Danniella Westbrook) and Tony helps her by standing up to Trudy. Tony and Jacqui then get back together and they destroy the vodka although they are shocked when they see that Trudy has robbed Tony's apartment. Tony makes sure that Jacqui gets extra security in case Trudy does the same to her.

Jacqui then begins working for Trudy again to get money as Mercedes is kidnapped by Clare Devine (Gemma Bissix) and Clare demands £200,000 or she will kill Mercedes. However, Tony is furious when he finds this out and tells Jacqui that if she continues to work for Trudy then he will leave her and Jacqui agrees not to work for Trudy anymore. Tony then plans to propose to Jacqui although when she doesn't show up, Tony realises that she is still working for Trudy and tells her that they are over. Trudy then gives Jacqui £200,000 to release Mercedes although Trevor Royle (Greg Wood) wants this money and attempts to kill Jacqui for it. Tony then saves Jacqui and him and they plan to escape together in case Trevor comes after her. Tony is shocked when he finds out that he has got Diane O'Connor (Alex Fletcher) pregnant with twins and when Jacqui hears this, she leaves Hollyoaks Village by herself. Tony then lets Diane move in with him along with her stepchildren, Sinead (Stephanie Davis) and Finn (Keith Rice).

Tony is then shocked when he discovers he has testicular cancer and tells Darren although refuses to tell Diane. Cindy later finds out about Tony's cancer. Sinead then gives birth to her baby Katy which Diane initially adopts although Sinead then wants the baby and moves in with drug-dealer Ste Hay (Kieron Richardson). Sinead then starts drug-dealing and is reported to social services. Tony accuses Diane of reporting Sinead and is furious with her. He then moves in with Cindy. Diane later finds out about Tony's cancer, however, and Tony and Diane then re-unite with Tony moving back in with Diane. In October 2013, Tony and Diane decide to go to the seaside the day that Tony will get the news about whether his cancer has cleared or not. Tony and Diane discover that they met when they were children at the same seaside they are at now. Diane suddenly goes in to labor and she is rushed to the hospital. Tony's phone frequently rings as he is about to be told the news about his cancer, although he refuses to pick up as he wants to see Diane give birth to their children first. Diane gives birth to a boy named Anthony (the name Diane knew Tony as when they met as children) and Dee Dee (the name Tony knew Diane as). After this, Tony picks up his phone and is thrilled when he is told that his cancer has been cleared.

In 2014, Tony falls for Sinead and she agrees to sleep with him so that she can film it and show Diane who she hates as Diane is blaming her for the death of her daughter, Katy. However, Sinead ends up actually falling for Tony and decides not to show Diane the tape. Tony and Sinead continue their affair, however when Cindy catches them kissing, she demands money from Tony so that she can run away with Rhys, who she believes is still alive due to her bipolar disorder . When Tony and Sinead's affair nearly results in the twins going missing, Tony attempts to call it off and instead gets engaged to Diane. However, Tony and Sinead end up continuing their affair and stay at a hotel together. Diane is suspicious over Tony's hotel visit and attempts to find out the truth, and when she speaks to the hotel receptionist she discovers that Tony has been having an affair. Diane is furious with Tony, therefore Tony hides the fact that the girl was Sinead in order to stop further problems. Tony then ends the affair with Sinead, and after speaking to Diane she agrees to get married again. Sinead later discovers she is pregnant.

On their wedding day, Diane discovers a letter written by Sinead to her mystery lover and realises at the altar that it is addressed to Tony. She flees without explanation, but later returns to marry Tony. At the reception, Diane announces that she knows Sinead was the woman Tony had an affair with, and that she only went through with the marriage to be able to divorce Tony and take all his assets, thus securing the children's future.

In 2015, Tony and Diane are left shocked to discover that Diane and Tegan Lomax (Jessica Ellis) babies, Dee Dee and Rose were swapped at birth, meaning Rose is Diane and Tony's biological daughter and Dee Dee is Tegan's. But in June 2015, panic strikes the village when Rose is taken by a mystery culprit, several of the villagers, including Diane, Tony, Tegan, Simone Loveday (Jacqueline Boatswain) and Louis Loveday (Karl Collins). In the time Rose is missing, both Diane and Tony have been arrested and at one point, Tony ends up kissing Tegan, which Diane witnesses, resulting in her pouring water over him. In October 2015, Tony hosts a Gay Pride event to prove to Diane's nephew, Scott Drinkwell (Ross Adams) and Esther Bloom (Jazmine Franks) that he is not a homophobic. However, on the day of the event, he discovers that his son, Harry (now played by Parry Glasspool), has been having an affair with his best friend and business partner, Ste, he is outraged at this and tries to keep the two apart. Diane later reveals to Tony that she still loves him and wants them to renew their wedding vows. Before they renew their vows, Diane and Tony emotionally give Rose back to Tegan and then proceed to renew their vows. Tony is later left shocked as Scott tries to frame him for poisoning Diane and they discover this with Tony wanting Scott out of the house but after an emotional chat, Diane allows him to stay. He then finally accepts his son's sexuality and relationship with Ste. Following the poison drama, Diane temporarily leaves the village, leaving Tony to run the Hutch on his own, however she returns in February 2016. In May 2016, Tony and Diane discover that Scott has been helping Marnie Nightingale (Lysette Anthony) and her son, James (Gregory Finnegan), to get The Hutch off them, which they later agree to sell to Marnie due their ongoing money issues. They are later employed by Marnie but find themselves controlled. In June 2016, a man named Mr Sheffield arrives at the flat and offers Diane and Tony jobs in a restaurant in Paris, Diane as a waitress and Tony as a chef. They accept but Tony is later saddened to know that he will be working as a junior chef and decides not to go, however Diane convinces him to go. The day of their departure arrives in July 2016, but as him and Diane are about to leave, Harry breaks the news that Ste is back on drugs so he decides to stay, whilst Diane leaves for France. In August 2016, he unites with Darren, Maxine Minniver (Nikki Sanderson) and Grace Black (Tamara Wall) to try and frame Warren and get him out of the village. Grace conducts the plan that they burn down the garage but Warren catches Darren, Maxine and Tony, they have been set up. In October 2016, Cindy is employed as pot washer at Nightingales and they both find themselves controlled by Marnie. He is later shocked but delighted as Cindy's sister, Jude Cunningham (Davinia Taylor) returns to the village as a property developer, with a plan to build luxurious flats in the village, unaware it is a scam.

In 2018, Tony begins to struggle when his daughter Dee Dee is diagnosed with autoimmune encephalitis. Unable to accept this, he leaves the village without informing Diane. Two months later, it is revealed that Tony has been staying with his former girlfriend Julie. Tony decides to return to the village after agreeing speaking with both Ste and Julie. He explains to Diane where he has been and she accepts his explanation. Diane understands that staying in the village proved to traumatic for Tony due to the painful memories connected to the loss of his daughter Grace. Tony and Harry repair their relationship and Harry agrees to let Tony stick around so that they can work on their relationship.

In 2019, Tony is attacked by Breda McQueen (Moya Brady) in the village after he realises that she has killed Harry, amongst others. Tony's future is unclear but until is revealed that he is alive and being kept captive at Breda's pig farm. Breda makes Diane believe that Tony has been having an affair and has left her, but in January 2020, he is rescued by Mercedes and is taken to hospital. Diane is shocked to see Tony, but is ashamed as she has started a romance with his father, Edward Hutchinson. Tony is also reunited with his sister, Verity Hutchinson (Eva O'Hara). Edward is not happy about Tony's return, and considers murdering him in the hospital. Tony moves back in with Diane, his children and Edward, who is now living with them. Tony suffers PTSD from his time in the pig farm.

== Reception ==
Pickard was nominated at the 2001 British Soap Awards for "Best Comedy Performance". The following year Pickard was nominated in the "Best Actor" and "Best Comedy Performance" category. In 2002 Pickard was nominated for "Best TV Personality" at the Liverpool Echo Awards. At the 2010 Inside Soap Awards Tony's wedding to Cindy was nominated for "Best Wedding". At the 2013 National Television Awards Pickard was nominated in the category of "Serial Drama Performance". In 2017, Pickard won the "British Soap Award for Outstanding Achievement" after 22 years of playing Tony. It was the first time a Hollyoaks cast member had received the award. In 2018, Pickard and Fletcher were nominated for "Best Partnership" at the Inside Soap Awards. In 2025, Tony and Diane received a "Best Soap Couple" nomination at the Digital Spy Reader Awards.

Tony was listed in "The Top 100 Soap Hunks of All Time" by What's on TV. What's on TV also listed Tony and Mandy at number 9 in "The Top 10 Soap Love Affairs of All Time" before they listed the couple's wedding in "The 50 top weddings of all time". In a 2009 poll by Loaded magazine, Tony was voted eighth in the "Top Soap Bloke of all time". The character was selected as one of the "top 100 British soap characters" by industry experts for a poll to be run by What's on TV, with readers able to vote for their favourite character to discover "Who is Soap's greatest Legend?"

In her book Soap Stars, Debbie Foy refers to Tony as having lived through several dramatic episodes. Foy went on to describe Tony as being famous for his "many on-screen relationships, affairs and engagements" but always has plenty of heartache. The Daily Star described Tony as going "through more women than he’s served hot meals in his restaurant Gnosh" before adding that he is a "loser-in-love". They commented that after dumping Cindy "this time he’s only got himself to blame". On the character Sky said: "Tony Hutchinson is our fave character on the show. Probably because he's been on it the whole time since it started in 1995". An Inside Soap critic responded negatively to a plot centring on Tony catering for the college ball saying "Just who do the Hollyoaks writers think they are catering for with a plot like this? Do us a favour and serve up something decent!" The Liverpool Echo's Caroline Corcoran reviewed Hollyoaks: Movin' On saying the spinoff provided "an insight in to Tony's character that we don't get in Hollyoaks, and I actually found myself feeling for a character that is normally written to be deliberately irritating". Another critic for Inside Soap felt Hollyoaks was back to a high standard before adding that "Tony Hutchinson has been on fine comedy form following the disastrous transformation of his garden by 'Charlie Dimmock'". Inside Soap's Lucy said that "You've got to feel sorry for Hollyoaks's Tony Hutchinson ... Give the man a break!" Following Tony's relationship with Mandy becoming troubled. Lucy's colleague Sam also reviewed the storyline saying: "Feel sorry for Tony? Oh get over it! He deserves everything he's got coming to him. What is Mandy doing with him anyway? He's far too old, a total fuddy duddy, and has had the same naff hairstyle for seven years!" While reflecting on "some of soap's more memorable business ideas", an Inside Soap writer, on Tony's business ideas, said: "Tony Hutchinson, is not so much the king of money-making schemes - more of an old skin-flint ... he came up with the idea of recycling all his guest's used water ... When his recycling racket was discovered, his claims that it was just an innovative method of being environmentally friendly wouldn't wash - we all knew it was just his cheap-skate way of reducing his water bill! However, to this day his roses continue to bloom strangely well". Inside Soap critic Sam expressed disinterest in a storyline in which Tony and Ruth kiss, questioning if they have "gone back in time or something?" Merle Brown of the Daily Record bemoaned the lack of realism in Tony's storylines saying: "why on earth would Izzy go out with Tony? Yes, she's slightly irritating, but in the real world would a man like Tony honestly have a constant stream of girlfriends?" During the Enjoy The Ride storyline, Inside Soap's Sarah said "there are standout performances from some of my all-time favourite Hollyoaks stars" which she said included Pickard.

Hollyoak's series producer Jo Hallows described Tony as a "fantastic" character and opined that Pickard had made the role his own. She went on to say that Tony is "easy to write for, because you can throw any story at him, both serious and frivolous, and you know that Nick will make a good job of it. He'll make you laugh and he'll also make you cry". Hallows opined that Pickard is "probably the person I've cried at the most, some of the more difficult stories he's done, even though you know the story that's coming up, you can't help but have a lump in your throat". Another series producer Bryan Kirkwood praised Pickard's acting skills, stating that he felt Pickard is a "brilliant" actor. He said he was "particularly pleased in moving Tony away from the buffoon he had become over the years into heartbreaking stories such Grace's death and his relationship with Jacqui. He's a touching and sensitive actor who's always over-looked". Series producer Paul Marquess praised Pickard, saying he felt that "there's only so many daft Tony stories you can do. He's so key to the show and so able and adept". Pickard's colleague Gemma Merna praised Pickard saying Pickard has "had some great storylines", adding that if she was "half as successful as Nick is on the show and liked as much then I would love to stay".

An Inside Soap columnist criticised the Tony's early relationship stories. They wrote that "we had to suspend belief" when Tony had two women fighting over him. They did not believe that Izzy and Julie would interested romantically with the "petulant chef". They were more critical of his "passionate tryst" with Helen, adding that "we're seriously questioning the scriptwriters' sanity" for creating their romance. Another praised Hollyoaks' return to a good "standard" in August 2002 due to story changes. They praised Tony's comedic value he added to the show, stating "Tony Hutchinson has been on fine comedy form following the disastrous transformation of his garden by 'Charlie Dimmock'."

== Bibliography ==
- Evans, Matthew (2002). Phil Redmond's Hollyoaks: the official companion. Channel 4. ISBN 978-0-7522-2000-0.
- Foy, Debbie (2009). Soap Stars (21st Century Lives). Hodder Wayland. ISBN 978-0-7502-5689-6.
