= Jorgie Porter =

English actress and model (born 1987)

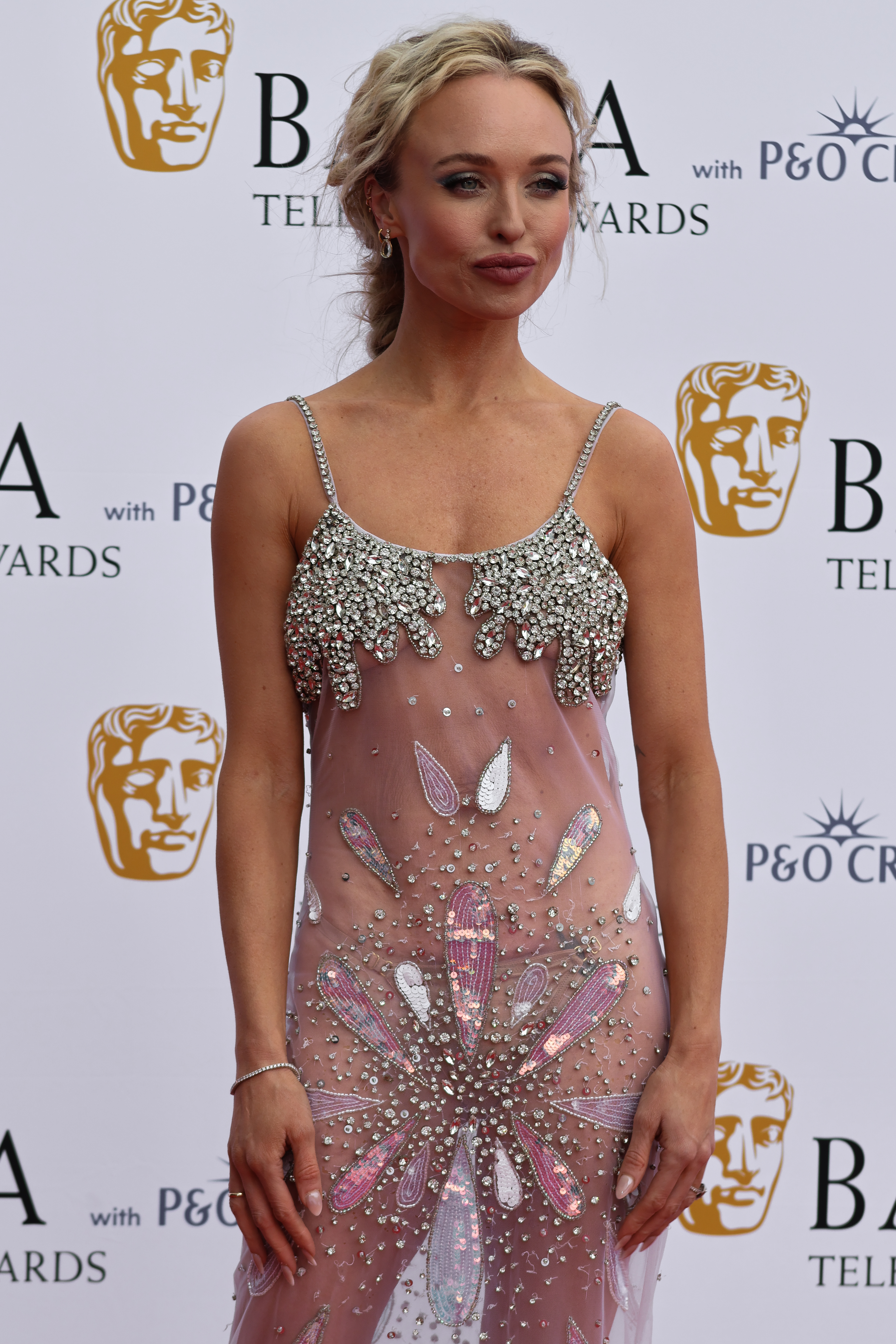
- Porter at the 2026 British Academy Television Awards in London, England
- Born: Jorgina Alexandra Porter; 25 December 1987 (age 38); Trafford, Greater Manchester, England
- Occupations: Actress; model
- Years active: 2008–present
- Known for: Hollyoaks (2008–2016, 2020–present); Dancing on Ice (2012, 2014); I'm a Celebrity... Get Me Out of Here! (2015)
- Partner: Oliver Piotrowski
- Children: 2

Jorgina Alexandra Porter (born 25 December 1987) is an English actress and model. She is known for playing Theresa McQueen in the Channel 4 soap opera Hollyoaks from 2008 until 2016 and again from 2020.

== Early life ==
Jorgina Alexandra Porter was born on 25 December 1987 in Trafford, Greater Manchester. She grew up with her mother and grandmother. A former ballet dancer, she was told by the ballet school she attended that she was overweight for a dancer. She later attended The Hammond School in Chester.

== Career ==
In November 2008, it was announced that Porter had joined the cast of the Channel 4 soap opera Hollyoaks, playing the role of Theresa McQueen. Porter said that she was "thrilled" to join the cast and be a part of one of soap opera's "most notorious families". In 2010, Porter appeared with eight other soap opera actresses in a music video and cover of the Cyndi Lauper single "Girls Just Want To Have Fun". The song was released in aid of charity, Cancer Research UK's campaign "Race for Life".

Porter appeared in the November 2010 issue of Sugar. In FHM's 100 Sexiest Women in the World 2011, Porter was ranked 50th. In August 2011, Porter took part in the ITV dance show Born to Shine. She learned to street dance on the show, but failed to make it to the final.

In 2012, Porter was confirmed to be a contestant and participant on the seventh series of Dancing on Ice. Porter was paired dancing with American pairs skater Matt Evers. Porter made it to the final and finished in second place behind Emmerdale actor Matthew Wolfenden.

In 2013, Porter decided to leave Hollyoaks. In October that year, she said she was leaving the show at the end of her contract. After finishing filming on the show she appeared on the final series of Dancing On Ice in January 2014, which featured returning contestant 'All Stars' from past series. Porter and her skating partner Sylvain Longchambon were the first contestants to be voted off the series. In April, it was announced that Porter had agreed to return to Hollyoaks.

In 2014, she released her own calendar for 2015, showing some of her modelling shoots and photos. She has also released another calendar for 2016. Porter is the presenter for the Nintendo Girls Club. In July 2015, Porter announced that she was leaving Hollyoaks once again. Her final scenes as the character aired on 11 March 2016. In November 2015, Porter took part in the fifteenth series of ITV show I'm a Celebrity...Get Me Out of Here!. She finished 5th on the show.

In 2016, Porter was cast as Miss Croft in a reboot episode of the series Are You Being Served?. She also became the new face of the UK advertising campaign for the skincare brand Proactiv. In 2017, she appeared as a contestant in Celebs Go Dating.

== Modelling ==
As an actress and model, Jorgie was chosen as the face of major international skincare brand Proactiv+ and was an ambassador for Teenage Cancer Trust's annual sun safety campaign. She appeared in the November 2010 issue of Sugar magazine. Along with then co-stars Rachel Shenton and James Atherton, they appeared on the cover of First Car Magazine, a magazine aimed at young drivers, in November 2011. She has also in men's magazine Loaded in 2009 and as the cover girl in 2011,

Porter celebrated being voted Hottest Female Soap Star by the readers of FHM UK Magazine in 2012 by appearing on the cover of the September issue of the magazine. She appeared topless (covered) with Atherton in the September 2012 issue of Cosmopolitan in support of breast cancer.

== Personal life ==
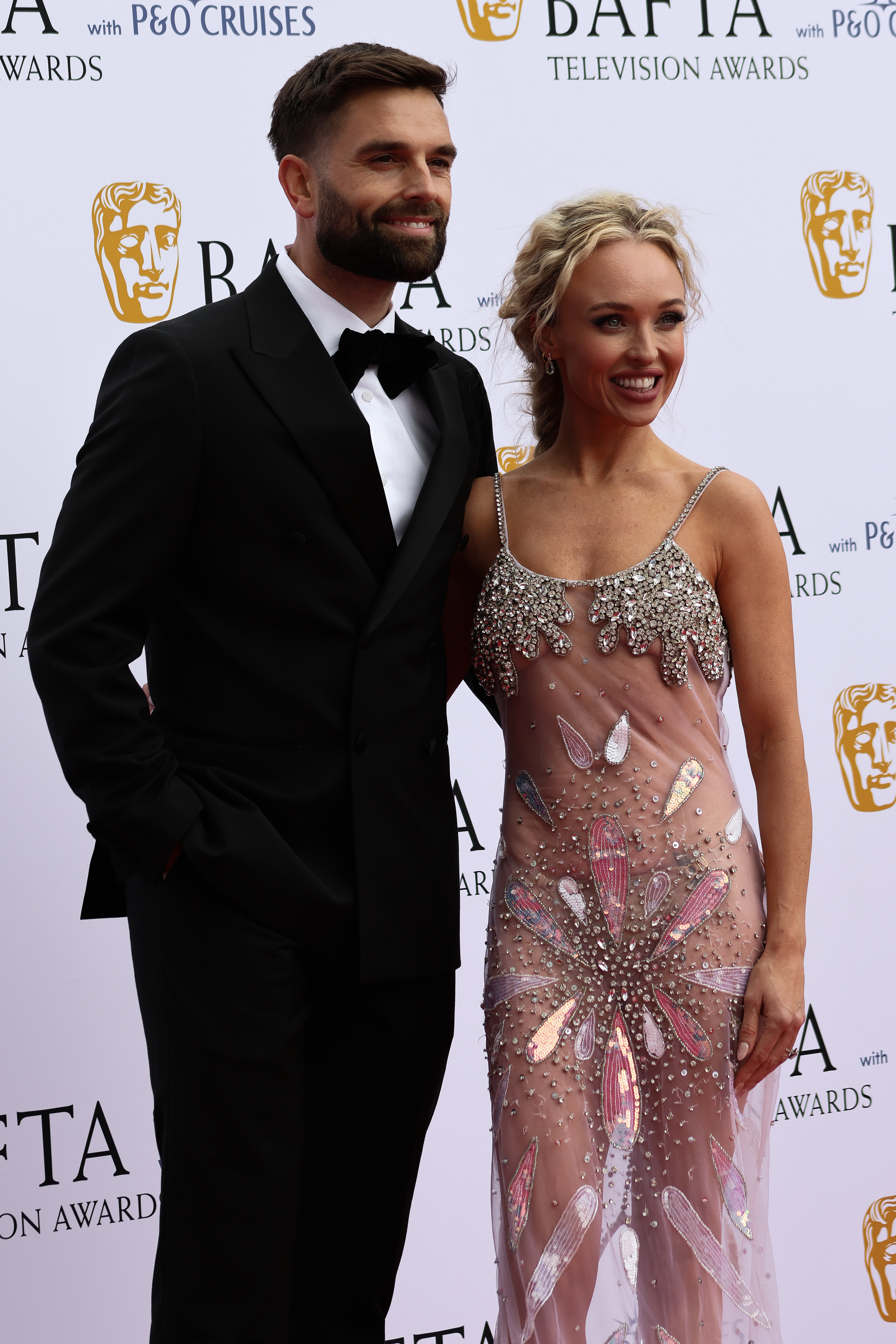
Porter and Piotrowski in 2026

Porter is engaged to Oliver Piotrowski. In November 2021, she revealed that she had miscarried the couple's quadruplets. In June 2022, Porter announced that she is expecting their rainbow baby. Their son was born in November 2022. In May 2024, Porter announced that she is expecting her second child. In December 2024, they welcomed their daughter.

== Filmography ==
| Year | Title | Role | Notes |
|---|---|---|---|
| 2008–2016, 2020– | Hollyoaks | Theresa McQueen | Series regular |
| 2009–2013 | Hollyoaks Later | Theresa McQueen | 20 episodes |
| 2012 | Dancing on Ice | Herself | Contestant |
| 2014 | Dancing on Ice | Herself | Contestant |
| 2015 | I'm a Celebrity... Get Me Out of Here! | Herself | Contestant |
| 2015 | Celebrity First Dates | Herself | Guest appearance |
| 2016 | Are You Being Served? | Miss Croft | One-off special |
| 2017 | Celebs Go Dating | Herself | Main cast |
| 2018 | Celebrity Haunted Mansion | Herself | Contestant |
| 2018 | Impossible Celebrities | Herself | Contestant |
| 2020 | Hollyoaks Does Come Dine with Me | Herself | Contestant |
| 2020 | Hey Tracey! | Herself | Series 2 episode 2 |
| 2021 | CelebAbility | Herself | Series 5 episode 4 |
| 2023 | Second Hand Style-Up | Herself | Host |
| 2024 | Drama Queens | Herself | Upcoming series |

== Awards and nominations ==
Porter was part of the 'Best Family' win at the 2009 Inside Soap Awards. Also, she has been nominated for Best Actress on multiple occasions and featured regularly on FHM sexiest lists.

| Year | Ceremony | Category (Note: Jorgie Porter was ranked 50th in 2011, 86th in 2012, 13th in 2013, 28th in 2014 and 40th in 2015 in (UK) FHM's 100 Sexiest Women in the World list.) | Work | Result | Ref |
|---|---|---|---|---|---|
| 2009 | British Soap Awards | Best Newcomer | Hollyoaks | Nominated | |
| 2009 | Inside Soap Awards | Best Family | Hollyoaks | Won | |
| 2009 | Inside Soap Awards | Best Newcomer | Hollyoaks | Longlisted | |
| 2009 | TV Quick & Choice Awards | Best Newcomer | Hollyoaks | Nominated | |
| 2010 | British Soap Awards | Best Actress | Hollyoaks | Longlisted | |
| 2011 | All About Soap Awards | Best Celeb Style | Herself | Nominated | |
| 2011 | National Television Awards | Best Serial Drama Performance | Hollyoaks | Longlisted | |
| 2011 | British Soap Awards | Best Actress | Hollyoaks | Longlisted | |
| 2011 | British Soap Awards | Sexiest Female | Hollyoaks | Longlisted | |
| 2011 | Inside Soap Awards | Best Actress | Hollyoaks | Longlisted | |
| 2011 | TV Choice Awards | Best Soap Actress | Hollyoaks | Nominated | |
| 2011 | FHM | 100 Sexiest Women in the World | Herself | Nominated | |
| 2012 | All About Soap Awards | Best Dressed Soap Star | Herself | Nominated | |
| 2012 | British Soap Awards | Sexiest Female | Hollyoaks | Shortlisted | |
| 2012 | National Reality TV Awards | Reality Personality of the Year | Dancing On Ice | Nominated | |
| 2012 | Inside Soap Awards | Best Dressed Soap Star | Herself | Nominated | |
| 2012 | FHM | 100 Sexiest Women in the World | Herself | Nominated | |
| 2012 | FHM | Hottest Female Soap Star | Hollyoaks | Won | |
| 2012 | Maxim | Top 10 Sexiest Soap Stars (Note: Jorgie Porter was ranked 2nd in (UK) Maxim's Top 10 Sexiest UK Soap Stars behind Alison King.) | Hollyoaks | Nominated | |
| 2013 | British Soap Awards | Sexiest Female | Hollyoaks | Shortlisted | |
| 2013 | Inside Soap Awards | Sexiest Female | Hollyoaks | Longlisted | |
| 2013 | FHM | 100 Sexiest Women in the World | Herself | Nominated | |
| 2013 | FHM | Sexiest Women on TV (Note: Jorgie Porter was ranked 2nd in (UK) FHM's 100 Sexiest Women on Television behind Michelle Keegan.) | Herself | Nominated | |
| 2014 | British Soap Awards | Sexiest Female | Hollyoaks | Shortlisted | |
| 2014 | Inside Soap Awards | Best Family | Hollyoaks | Shortlisted | |
| 2014 | FHM | 100 Sexiest Women in the World | Herself | Nominated | |
| 2015 | FHM | 100 Sexiest Women in the World | Herself | Nominated | |
| 2015 | What's on TV | The 20 Sexiest Soap Females (Note: Jorgie Porter was ranked 11th in What's on TV's The 20 Sexiest Soap Females 2015!) | Hollyoaks | Nominated | |
| 2021 | The Version Soap Awards | Best Actress | Hollyoaks | Nominated | |
| 2022 | Inside Soap Awards | Best Family | Hollyoaks | Shortlisted | |
| 2023 | Inside Soap Awards | Best Family | Hollyoaks | Shortlisted | |
| 2024 | Radio Times Soap Awards | Best Comedy Performance | Hollyoaks | Nominated | |
| 2024 | Inside Soap Awards | Best Comedy Performance | Hollyoaks | Shortlisted | |
| 2024 | National Film Awards UK | Best Actress in a TV Series | Hollyoaks | Nominated | |

== See also ==
- List of Dancing on Ice contestants
- List of I'm a Celebrity...Get Me Out of Here! (British TV series) contestants
