= James Redmond (actor) =

English actor (b. 1971)

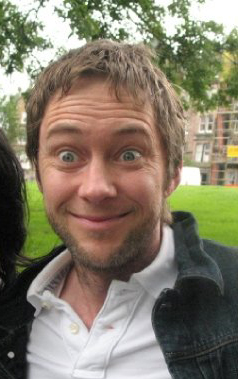
- Born: James William Forbes Redmond; 24 November 1971 (age 54); London, England
- Education: Clifton College
- Occupations: Actor; model; presenter
- Years active: 1997–present
- Children: 1

James William Forbes Redmond (born 24 November 1971) is an English actor, presenter, stand-up comedian and model, known for his roles as Abs Denham in Casualty and Rory Finnigan in Hollyoaks.

== Career ==
Redmond first rose to fame when he began modelling in Milan in April 1994, after being spotted by fashion scout Calvin French. Following a string of advert appearances, he was offered a part in the Channel 4 soap opera Hollyoaks. Redmond played Rory Finnigan on the show between 1998 and 2002, before leaving the series to present SMTV Live and CD:UK. Redmond's stint at SMTV Live lasted three months, as producers decided he had not settled into the role leaving Redmond reportedly "gutted".

Redmond resumed his acting career with a leading role in the first series of Sky One drama Mile High. Then in 2003, he began portraying the role of Abs Denham in the BBC medical drama Casualty, and remained on the series for five years until he quit in 2008, the character's final episode airing on 18 October 2008. In 2010, he appeared on Come Dine with Me with soap stars Adele Silva, Lorraine Chase and Brian Capron. Since then, Redmond has made a move into stand-up comedy, committing to an 18-month apprenticeship on the open-mic circuit, performing at the Edinburgh Festival Fringe in August 2011.

Redmond joined the cast of ITV soap Emmerdale at the end of February 2014. Redmond also joined ITV soap Coronation Street in January 2015 for a three-week stint as Hamish. Eight years after his departure from the show, Redmond made a guest appearance in Casualty in the feature-length special to celebrate the thirtieth anniversary of the series. Redmond also made a guest appearance in The Coroner on 2 December 2016 in an episode titled "The Crash" In November 2019, he appeared in an episode of the BBC soap opera Doctors as Brian Allbright.

== Notable television appearances ==
- Hollyoaks (1998–2002, 2015, 2017–18, 2025)
- Hollyoaks: Movin' On (2001)
- SM:TV Live (2002)
- CD:UK (2002)
- Mile High (2003)
- Casualty (2003–08, 2016)
- Soccer AM (2003–08)
- Celebrity Come Dine With Me (2010)
- Total Wipeout Celebrity Special (2011)
- Hollyoaks Later (2013)
- Emmerdale (2014)
- Coronation Street (2015)
- The Coroner (2016) Episode 2.10 "Crash" as Dean Lowe
- ‘Hollyoaks’ (2019)
- ‘We Hunt Together’ (2021)
- ‘The Outlaws’ (2022)
