= Parry Glasspool =

English actor (born 1992)

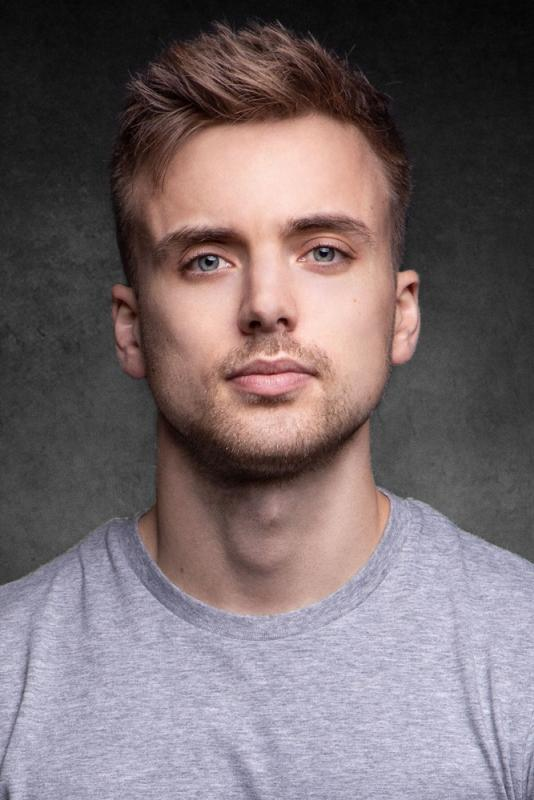
- Glasspool in 2020
- Born: 5 March 1992 (age 34); Hollywood, Worcestershire, England
- Occupation: Actor
- Notable work: Hollyoaks Later; Hollyoaks; Emmerdale
- Children: 1
- Relatives: Lloyd Glasspool (brother)

Parry Glasspool (born 5 March 1992) is a British actor. He played Harry Thompson in the Channel 4 soap opera Hollyoaks and was nominated for Best Newcomer at the 21st National Television Awards in 2016. The character was killed off in 2019 after four years on the soap. In 2022, Glasspool was cast in the ITV soap opera Emmerdale as Jason Denshaw.

== Early and personal life ==
Glasspool was born on 5 March 1992 to an English father and Welsh mother in Hollywood, Worcestershire, and was educated at Woodrush High School in Wythall and Stratford-upon-Avon College and then studied for a BA Honours in Acting for Stage and Media at Kingston College. He is the older brother of tennis player Lloyd Glasspool.

In August 2016, Glasspool posted a video on the social media application Instagram showing him wielding a knife while pretending to be a woman threatening to kill her boyfriend. Glasspool was suspended from Hollyoaks for two weeks.

== Career ==
Within a week of graduating from Kingston College, Glasspool was filming for series 6 of Hollyoaks Later, a spin-off of Hollyoaks. He was cast in the role of Tony Hutchinson's estranged son, Harry Thompson, who had previously appeared in Hollyoaks between 2007 and 2009, then played by Daniel Seymour and later Harrison George Rhodes. Glasspool noted that being called Parry and playing a character called Harry can be confusing, and that one person called him Parry on set and it was aired. After this, he appeared in a two short films: How To Be Sexy by Isabelle Sieb and Cicada by Delouris Collins – and on Our Zoo for BBC One. He later moved to Liverpool after being invited to participate in the main series of Hollyoaks. For his role, he was nominated for best newcomer at the National Television Awards. Glasspool left Hollyoaks in July 2019 after his character was killed by resident serial killer Breda McQueen (Moya Brady).

He then joined the theatre production, By The Waters of Liverpool. The tour was supposed to run from March until the end of May 2020 but due to the COVID-19 lockdown, the play was cancelled after only two weeks of production. In 2022, he appeared in the ITV soap opera Emmerdale as Jason Denshaw.
