= Louise Taylor (Hollyoaks) =

- Hollyoaks character
- Portrayed by: Brett O'Brien
- Duration: 1995–1996
- First appearance: 23 October 1995
- Last appearance: 13 May 1996
- Created by: Phil Redmond
- Introduced by: Phil Redmond
In-universe information
- Occupation: Student

Louise Taylor is a fictional character from the British soap opera Hollyoaks, played by Brett O'Brien. Louise is one of Hollyoaks' original characters and she debuted on-screen during the show's first episode, which was broadcast on 23 October 1995. Louise is one of seven main characters the series initially focused on. They are portrayed as teenagers living in a fictional middle-class suburb of Chester. O'Brien secured the role after a lengthy audition process which she later recalled as being "quite awful" - especially since her final audition lasted two days. Actress Julie Buckfield, who plays Julie Matthews, also read for the part during auditions.

Louise is characterised as a loyal friend who is honest and generous. She is also portrayed as having a keen interest in the supernatural and follows horoscopes. Louise's role in the show is a college student studying theatre and English. Like the other original core characters, the show explores Louise's life after completing her GCSE studies and how she navigates towards her future aspirations. O'Brien noted that the show is not preachy and the characters are also there to enjoy themselves. Writers developed a friendship group between Louise, Natasha Andersen (Shebah Ronay), Maddie Parker (Yasmin Bannerman) and Dawn Cunningham (Lisa Williamson). They also created a relationship storyline with Kurt Benson (Jeremy Edwards). O'Brien made her final appearance as Louise during the episode broadcast on 13 May 1996. Louise's departure storyline features her struggling to cope with Natasha's death and moving away with a traveller, Tree. Despite her short tenure, Louise was well received by critics of the genre. Some described her as kooky and included to add comic relief. Some journalists criticised Louise's original stories and dialogue.

== Casting ==
More than five thousand people auditioned for parts in the original Hollyoaks cast in early 1995. Dublin born actress Brett O'Brien was cast as Louise. The character was O'Brien's first television role. She learned about the auditions for Hollyoaks from her friend, decided to apply and received an audition. O'Brien recalled to a Liverpool Echo writer that "they did audition me, time and time and time again." Actress Julie Buckfield also read for the part of Louise in her original audition. Buckfield progressed to further auditions but was chosen to play fellow original character Julie Matthews instead.

O'Brien found the audition process difficult because it was long-winded. She told Catherine Murphy from The Herald that "the auditions were quite awful" because of the numerous call-backs and the final audition, which she revealed did last forty-eight hours. She likened to process to a "cattle market" because Hollyoaks' producers "saw all kinds of different people." O'Brien completed the two day audition which finally lead to her receiving the role. She recalled that "I never slept waiting to hear if I'd got it: I was just buzzing." O'Brien lived in London and accommodated her filming schedule during weekdays by staying in Liverpool hotels where the show's production is based. O'Brien returned home at weekends and described her experiences during this time as "great fun".

Hollyoaks initially focused on the lives of seven teenagers living in a fictional middle-class suburb of Chester. Louise is one of the original characters created by Phil Redmond, and she was introduced in the show's first episode, which was first broadcast on 23 October 1995. Ahead of her debut, O'Brien told Fiona Shepherd from The Scotsman that show would not be preachy. She explained "it's not preaching that it's better to be rich or that it's better to be poor. It's just a bunch of kids having a laugh."

== Development ==
"Louise, 17, is the kind of friend everyone wants - loyal, and honest - but with an abnormal interest in the supernatural. Now at sixth form college where she met Natasha, she was sent to private school by parents hoping she would become a lawyer or architect. Therefore she is studying theatre and English!"

— Louise's character outline published in the Chester Chronicle (October 1995).

Louise is introduced as one of the show's seven core characters also consisting of Maddie Parker (Yasmin Bannerman), Natasha Andersen (Shebah Ronay), Dawn Cunningham (Lisa Williamson) and the male collective of Kurt Benson (Jeremy Edwards), Tony Hutchinson (Nick Pickard) and Jambo Bolton (Will Mellor). The series focus' on the seven characters' lives after they have finished their GCSE studies and are "starting out in the world". Redmond summarised the show's narrative as being "it's about the two biggest issues in life - who I am and where I am going." Upon her introduction, "loyal Louise" is taking college courses in theatre studies and English. She also attends the same college as Natasha. Writers also developed a female friendship group between Louise, Natasha, Maddie and Dawn.

The character's outline publicised in British media ahead of her debut revealed that Louise is portrayed as a good friend. Her other personality traits include being "loyal, trustworthy, honest, generous" and a strange interest in things associated with the supernatural. In the book, Phil Redmond's Hollyoaks: The Official Companion, Matthew Evans described Louise as an "Earth mother" and a "hopeless romantic, causing her friends no end of trouble in her pursuit of the 'perfect' man." Evans added that Louise is also "obsessed with anything supernatural" and tries to live her life "according to what her horoscope dictated." O'Brien told a Liverpool Echo reporter that she was "not like" Louise apart from them both being Irish. O'Brien plays Louise using her own Dublin accent and she told Murphy that "I think producers were keen to have an Irish person in the cast. Certainly, I was told it wasn't a problem to have a Dublin accent."

O'Brien was aged twenty-five when she received the role, but Louise is portrayed as a seventeen-year-old. The actress tried not to allow the age difference to deter her from an authentic portrayal of Louise. She explained to Murphy that "I don't know whether I get away with it or not, but I think most people in the cast look older than 17 anyway. I try not to think of the character as 17: I just play each individual situation and try not to have the sophistication of a 25-year-old." Her age difference was not isolated occurrence as only one of the seven core actors were a teenager when they were cast in their roles.

Louise's stories in the first two episodes of Hollyoaks were previewed prior to transmission. It was revealed that she would be established as a "party girl" character who gets into trouble and is saved by Kurt. In the following episode Natasha later believes that Louise could be suicidal. Louise had previously been dating Joe (Guy Parry), who cheated on her at her seventeenth birthday party. Natasha and Dawn soon realised Louise was not suicidal but rather "heartbroken" over Joe. They then presume she might be pregnant. Writers developed a relationship storyline between Louise and Kurt. The duo become closer after her split with Joe but they too break-up after Louise refuses to have sex with him. In another storyline, writers introduced a "handsome guy", Dermot Ashton (Lauren Beales), who offers to help Louise organise the college revue and she develops an interest in him.

O'Brien left the role in 1996 after only eight months in the role and Louise's departure storyline featured her moving away with a traveller. Louise struggles to comprehend Natasha's death and even claims to have seen her ghost. After meeting the traveller named Tree, she begins "falling for" him and decides to leave with him. Her final scenes were broadcast in May 1996. Her departure made Louise the second most short-lived of the original characters after Natasha who was killed off two months prior. After O'Brien left the series she eventually went backpacking. She told an All About Soap reporter that "it wasn't quite running away with a new-age traveller like Louise did when she left Hollyoaks, but maybe she planted the idea in my head."

== Reception ==
In December 1995, Peter Grant from Liverpool Echo predicted that the popularity of the show's "magnificent seven" core characters would continue to rise in 1996. Grant noted there was "plenty more fun in store" and a "very happy new year in Hollyoaks" judging by storylines such as "Louise plunges into the world of amateur dramatics." In 2005, Grant described Louise as "the most enigmatic of the debut seven" core characters. Grant continued that Louise is "a hopeless romantic in search of the perfect man" and a "gypsy-like earth mother". He concluded that she was portrayed with "a strong interest in the supernatural and lived her life by sticking to what the horoscopes said." In 2021, Sophie McCoid and Lucy Marshall from the publication branded her a "kooky character" and "earth mother type". They added that Louise "lived in hope of finding the perfect man and paid a little too much attention to her horoscopes." Of the original cast and characters, Maggie Brown from The Guardian opined "the seven stars of Hollyoaks are good looking, bright eyed and cheerful, the sort of youngsters whose mothers made sure they went to the dentist. On-screen they tend to fix up their all-important social lives by mobile phone." Greg Taylor from Daily Mirror branded the core seven characters a group of "smart teenagers" that the show "revolves around". Kyle O'Sullivan, also from Daily Mirror called her a "kooky character" and a "hopeless romantic" who had a "troubled relationship with cheating and rough boyfriend Joe".

Manchester Evening News' Dominic Moffitt believed Louise's role in the show was to provide "the show's comic relief for a time." They also called her "a hippie" and "free loving type character" who "enjoyed a very short life on Hollyoaks." Tina Miles of Cheshire Live labelled Louise a "kooky character". Alina Polianskaya from the i newspaper stated "her character was into horoscopes and mystical ideas." Nick Chalmers from Northamptonshire Evening Telegraph wrote "Louise is nuts on anything a bit spooooky! She's at the same college as Natasha and a loyal, trustworthy friend too - what a poppet!" The Scotsman's Fiona Shepherd branded Louise a "drama queen" type character. She also opined she is a "impetuous dreamer with a strong belief in astrological fate and an interest in alien life forms." Shepherd also wondered how long it would take for writers to pair Louise and Kurt romantically. A reporter from Last Broadcast named her "responsible Louise" and "a bit of a stick in the mud". Stephanie Colderick writing for Wales Online stated Louise "loved her horoscopes" and was portrayed as a "more free-spirited character" than her fellow original counterparts. An E4.com writer called her one of the "first generation of Hollyoaks starlets" and one of the "original Hollyoaks gang". A writer from The Courier observed the female friendship group and decided that Natasha and Dawn "often have to cringe at the antics of fashion fanatic Maddie" and "to wonder at their supernatural obsessed friend Louise."

Of her departure episode, a Sutton Coldfield Observer critic assessed that the character is "behaving in a fashion that is increasingly disturbing." Daniel Kilkelly from Digital Spy stated that Louise had a "short shelf life" and that she received "a rather kooky exit storyline". He assessed that "the stars appeared to align for her when she fell for a New Age traveller called Tree." Francesca Babb from All About Soap believed that O'Brien "was great" in the role of Louise and subsequently was surprised the actress did not rise to prominence after she left the show.

Joe Steeples from Sunday Mirror criticised Hollyoaks' writing, storylines and the cast's acting abilities. He carped on about a scene featuring Louise and Natasha discussing her sex life. Louise states "We were compatible birth signs and everything. That's why I gave myself to him." Steeples branded the writing "pure Mills & Boon" and quipped that the executive producer, Redmond had been taking tablets that transformed him into the romance writer Barbara Cartland. Lucy Ellman of The Independent lambasted the role of the show's original female characters. She branded them "highly suspect" and were "given little to say, and spend their time worrying needlessly about each other." She added that they all entertain themselves "with bodings of disaster." Critiquing Louise's original story, Ellman bemoaned the scenes featuring Natasha assuming Louise would commit suicide because she had sex with a "two-timing louse" on the basis her star-sign advised her to. She further ridiculed Natasha's later concern Louise could be pregnant. Bryan Appleyard likened the original teenage characters to stereotypical "mallrats". Their colleague, Cole Morton minimised the importance of the original characters because they were written as "glamorous young things who live in leafy suburbs rather than urban mean streets, and have only to worry about their spots and mobile phones."
