= Julie Matthews (Hollyoaks) =

- Hollyoaks character
- Portrayed by: Julie Buckfield
- Duration: 1995–1997, 2002, 2007, 2018
- First appearance: 23 October 1995
- Last appearance: 20 September 2018
- Created by: Phil Redmond
- Introduced by: Phil Redmond (1995); Jo Hallows (2002); Bryan Kirkwood (2007, 2018)
In-universe information
- Occupation: Student; Shop assistant
- Father: Mr Matthews
- Mother: Maureen Matthews

Julie Matthews is a fictional character from the British soap opera Hollyoaks, played by Julie Buckfield. The character debuted on-screen during the first episode of Hollyoaks, which was broadcast on 23 October 1995. Buckfield originally auditioned for the role of Louise Taylor, but the role of Julie was created and given to her instead. Julie is portrayed as a student and she is characterised as a "goody two shoes" and a stereotypical "girl next door". Writers created her a relationship storyline with Tony Hutchinson (Nick Pickard). They endure an on-off relationship but is later developed into a wedding storyline.

In 1997, Buckfield left Hollyoaks and her departure storyline featured Julie jilting Tony on their wedding day. She reprised the role in 2002 and writers transformed Julie's good girl persona into a archetypical soap bitch with conniving tendencies. Julie becomes Tony's business partner in acquiring the local café, Deva. Writers also developed a rivalry between Julie and Tony's girlfriend, Izzy Cornwell (Elize du Toit). Julie begins sabotaging their relationship and scheming against Izzy. Julie was written out of the series again in November 2002, with her fleeing Hollyoaks after she has conned Tony. Buckfield was unsure whether Julie could return because of the characterisation changes but she returned again in 2007. Julie returns for Tony's thirtieth birthday which creates problems for Tony's relationship with Jacqui McQueen (Claire Cooper). In 2018, Buckfield reprised the role once again for a new storyline featuring Tony. The character has been well received by critics of the genre for her wedding storyline.

== Casting and characterisation ==
Buckfield's agent informed her that auditions were being held for Hollyoaks and she decided to try out for a role. Buckfield was unaware about which character she was auditioning for. Only vague information was provided but her agent compared the show to the US television series Baywatch. Buckfield arrived at the audition wearing "a Wonder-Bra, a little top and Capri pants." When she arrived, she learned the part would be a school girl, so she changed into a T-shirt and jeans. She later recalled "I was just told that she was a school girl, very young and very girly. And that was it!"

Buckfield initially read for the part of Louise Taylor. Buckfield progressed to further auditions in which she was placed with different actors. Julie was created after the initial auditions and awarded to Buckfield. She believed she was "lucky" to be a part of the Hollyoaks cast, adding it was "what I've been working towards my whole life." Buckfield made her first appearance as Julie in the Hollyoaks' debut episode, which was broadcast on 23 October 1995. Julie only briefly appeared in the episode. Buckfield told Neil Mattocks on his podcast that her family watched the episode and joked "oh is that it, oh is that all you done."

Julie is initially characterised as a "goody two shoes image" type character, with a "girl next door" image. In her later appearances writers portrayed her as a soap "bitch". She was also portrayed as "devious and deceitful". A writer from the official Hollyoaks website described Julie as having a "fearsome no-nonsense attitude" and also branded her "conniving" character.

== Development ==
=== Relationship with Tony Hutchinson ===
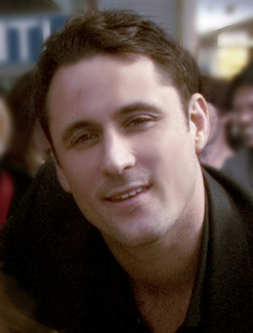
Nick Pickard (pictured) plays Julie's love interest, Tony Hutchinson.

Writers paired Julie in a relationship storyline with Tony Hutchinson (Nick Pickard), which was developed during the first month of Hollyoaks episodes. In the book, Phil Redmond's Hollyoaks: The Official Companion, it is described as a "love at first sight" story. Buckfield stated that the process of developing their romance was "bizarre" because she was friends with Pickard before joining Hollyoaks. She told a writer from the show's official website that "it feels like your brother really. It feels like your best mate. But we got over that. And it was good fun." She told Anne Adams from Evening Herald that Julie and Tony's relationship is supposed to be "light-hearted" and she viewed them as "a bit of a comedy couple." Buckfield also added dislike of Julie constantly referring to Tony as her "honeybunny" in their scenes.

The characters become engaged during the April 1996 episodes. Writers made the relationship between Julie and Tony problematic after they become engaged. In one scene, the pair argue and Julie throws her engagement ring at Tony. The scene occurs following Jude Cunningham (Davinia Taylor) and Ruth Osborne (Terri Dwyer) giving Tony a make-over, which makes Julie have a "jealous fit" and end their engagement. Buckfield told Adams that the pair could reunite following their break-up. She likened Julie's experience to her own, adding "she is just like I was at 16 falling head over heels with a first love."

Tony goes to Scotland determined to reconcile with her but is shocked to find her with another man. Tony goes to Ibiza and catches public lice after having sex. He and Julie reconcile, but he tries to avoid her questions about the holiday. Writers continued their on/off relationship with Tony breaking-up with Julie after witnessing her kiss her motorcycle instructor, Bruce. Tony then moves on by dating Marilyn (Vanessa Robinson). Julie continued sharing scenes with Tony via the video shop they both work at. Writers featured the bickering duo dividing the video shop in half to continue working alongside each other. When Tony breaks-up with Marilyn, he resumes his relationship with Julie and they become engaged again.

=== Wedding and departure ===
Buckfield left the series in 1997. Julie's exit storyline featured her and Tony arranging a marriage, only for Julie to stand him up at the altar. The wedding episode was broadcast on 11 August 1997. Pickard told Steven Murphy from Inside Soap that "Tony has a lot of nerves about the whole thing". He reasoned that Julie's parents has taken over the wedding plans which make him "feel a bit threatened". He also described the wedding plans as transforming Julie into "a complete superbitch" and it was "understandable" he was unsure about marrying her.

In the story, Tony's friend Kurt Benson (Jeremy Edwards) tries to convince Tony to not marry Julie and Jambo Bolton (Will Mellor) bets that the wedding will not happen. Tony decides he wants to marry Julie after all. When Julie makes it half-way down the aisle, she announces that she does not want to marry Tony and flees the church. The wedding took two days to film and received a "big budget". Pickard likened the experience as being on a movie set. Filming took place during warm weather, which he believed was great for the episode but not for the cast dressed in wedding attire. Buckfield enjoyed filming the wedding storyline because she did not think she would marry in real life. The scenes feature a grand wedding scenario with a horse and carriage Julie was stylised in a "great big meringue dress", which Buckfield felt suited Julie more than herself. She recalled that filming scenes in a wedding dress made her feel "really special". Pickard described Julie's appearance as "this full meringue dress floating down the aisle towards me."

Buckfield believed that Julie's departure scenes were memorable. She added "everyone remembers how I left Hollyoaks the first time around. I went out with a bang." Following her departure, the actress did not rule out a future returned, noting "it's been left open I haven't been killed off." She added that she missed working on the show. In October 2020, the episode featuring Julie and Tony's wedding was rebroadcast on E4 as part of Hollyoaks Favourites classic episodes.

=== Business scam and Izzy Cornwell feud ===
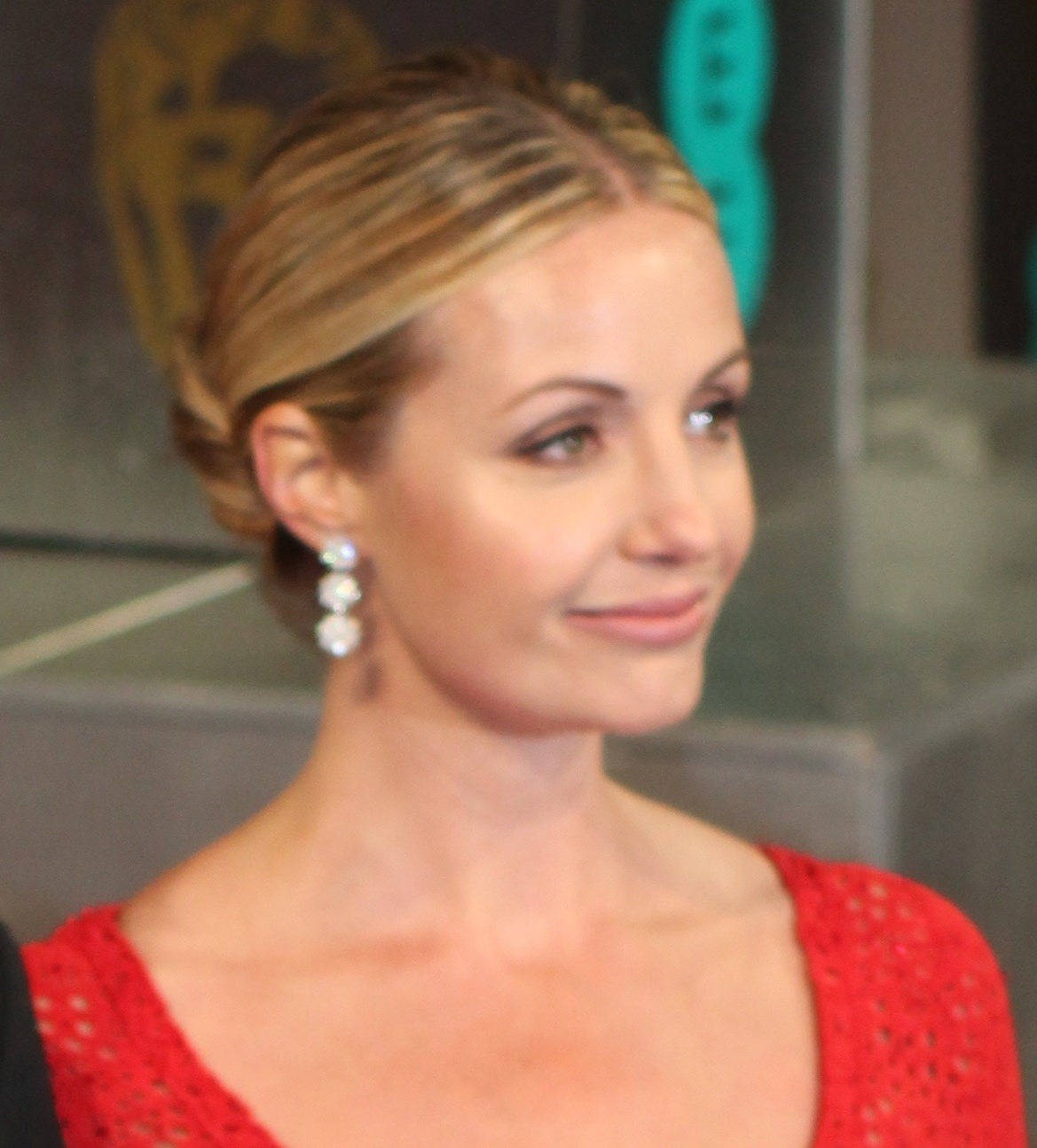
Elize du Toit (pictured) plays Julie's love rival, Izzy Cornwell.

Buckfield reprised the role in 2002 in a guest role and Julie returned during the episode broadcast on 12 August 2002. Producers asked Buckfield to return and she accepted because she loved Liverpool and had "such a good time" during her first stint. Buckfield revealed that the filming schedule was busier than that of her original stint, since the show broadcast more episodes per week. She described returning to filming as a "shock" that she had to adjust to. Writers transformed Julie's "goody two shoes image" and made her more a of archetypical bitch. Buckfield told a BBC reporter that Julie was originally portrayed as "very girl next door" but upon her return she is "a bit of a bitch". Her return storyline sees Julie swindling Tony out of his money. She enjoyed Julie's characterisation changes, adding "it was something I could really get my teeth into." Viewers responded well to the changes and Buckfield received "positive letters from it". In her return, Julie teams up with Tony in a bid to take over the local café, Deva and transform it into a restaurant. They compete with Gordon Cunningham (Bernard Latham), who is keen to add the business to his portfolio. A writer from the show's official website stated "the combination of Julie's fearsome no-nonsense attitude and Tony's nose for business has already made for a potent mix." Julie later manages to win the auction sale of Deva.

Another of Julie main aims is to ruin Tony's relationship with his girlfriend, Izzy Cornwell (Elize du Toit). Julie and Tony begin spending more time together and they become business partners. Izzy tries to be accepting and du Toit told David Hollingsworth from Soaplife that Tony reassures Izzy that she does not need to worry about his friendship. She noted that Izzy is worried about their relationship because Tony previously loved Julie enough to want to marry her. Izzy is also self-conscious about being perceived as "jealous and possessive" and does not want to be "a total psychopath" so remains calm. Tony believes Julie and Izzy could be potential friends, but du Toit believed that he is "being silly" because "it's perfectly obvious how different they are" and "Izzy doesn't trust her." Izzy later sees Julie and Tony in a compromising situation and she begins to wonder if Tony still has romantic feelings towards Julie. du Toit added that Tony just thinks Julie being around again is "great" because they can reminisce on old times together. du Toit concluded that Izzy would not allow Julie to snare Tony away from her and would ultimately "win".

Writers continued to play Julie and Izzy against each other, creating a rivalry between the pair. Julie begins to manipulate Tony, suggesting Izzy and Ben Davies' (Marcus Patric) friendship is more than platonic. Julie then sabotages Tony and Izzy's date plans. Izzy begins to monitor the situation more closely and worries she will lose Tony to Julie. du Toit told an Inside Soap reporter that "Izzy definitely feels a bit threatened because Julie and Tony used to be engaged." She added that Tony just carries on "pretending that there's absolutely nothing wrong with the situation" and fails to understand Izzy's worries. Izzy confides her worries about Julie with Ellie Hunter (Sarah Baxendale), who encourages Izzy to challenge Julie. du Toit explained that Izzy realises Julie is "devious and deceitful" and Ellie convinces Izzy that "it's war, and she shouldn't let Julie win." Izzy decides to dress up in a classy suit to impress Tony. Julie retaliates by "going for the obvious low-cut top, short skirt and high heels." Everyone prefers Julie's outfit and Izzy's plan "unfortunately" backfires. A Hollyoaks reporter added that "the battle of wits and whimsy between Izzy and Julie has become steadily more intense over the last couple of weeks." They noted that there was much spite between the two, and Tony is "helplessly trying to referee the spats." Izzy then decides to heighten the rivalry by enlisting the help of Kristian Hargreaves (Max Brown). She convinces Kristian to move into the flat share and use him to make Tony jealous. du Toit added that Izzy's plan fails because "Tony sees straight through her and isn't jealous at all... Typical!"

Tony plans to transform the Deva café into a restaurant, called Gnosh Village. Julie and Izzy use the opportunity to compete with their different business ideas. Debbie Dean (Jodi Albert) also becomes involved in their rivalry, wanting to become a waitress at the venue. Izzy is not happy with Debbie's inclusion but "Julie is taken in" by her. Pickard told an Inside Soap reporter that Tony does not realise what he is doing to hurt Izzy. He added that "Tony still has feelings for Julie" because "she was his first love." The story reached a conclusion when Tony proposes marriage to both Julie and Izzy, which are driven by confusion and wanting to keep the peace. The truth is revealed during an appearance on a television cooking show. Izzy tells Julie she is engaged to Tony, leaving Julie "stunned" because she is too. The pair ruin Tony's television debut by having a food fight live on air.

Julie remained on-screen until November 2002. Following her departure, Buckfield was unsure if she would return again. She wanted to but admitted that Julie's new bitch persona could hinder that. She explained "when you go as a bitch your character's life span can be over because you have to get your comeuppance." In 2005, Buckfield was questioned about a return potential for Hollyoaks' tenth anniversary. She stated it was unlikely because of her uncertainty about how writers could bring Julie back. She explained that "I went back before and turned into a bit of a bitch so they've done that!"

=== Returns (2007, 2018) ===
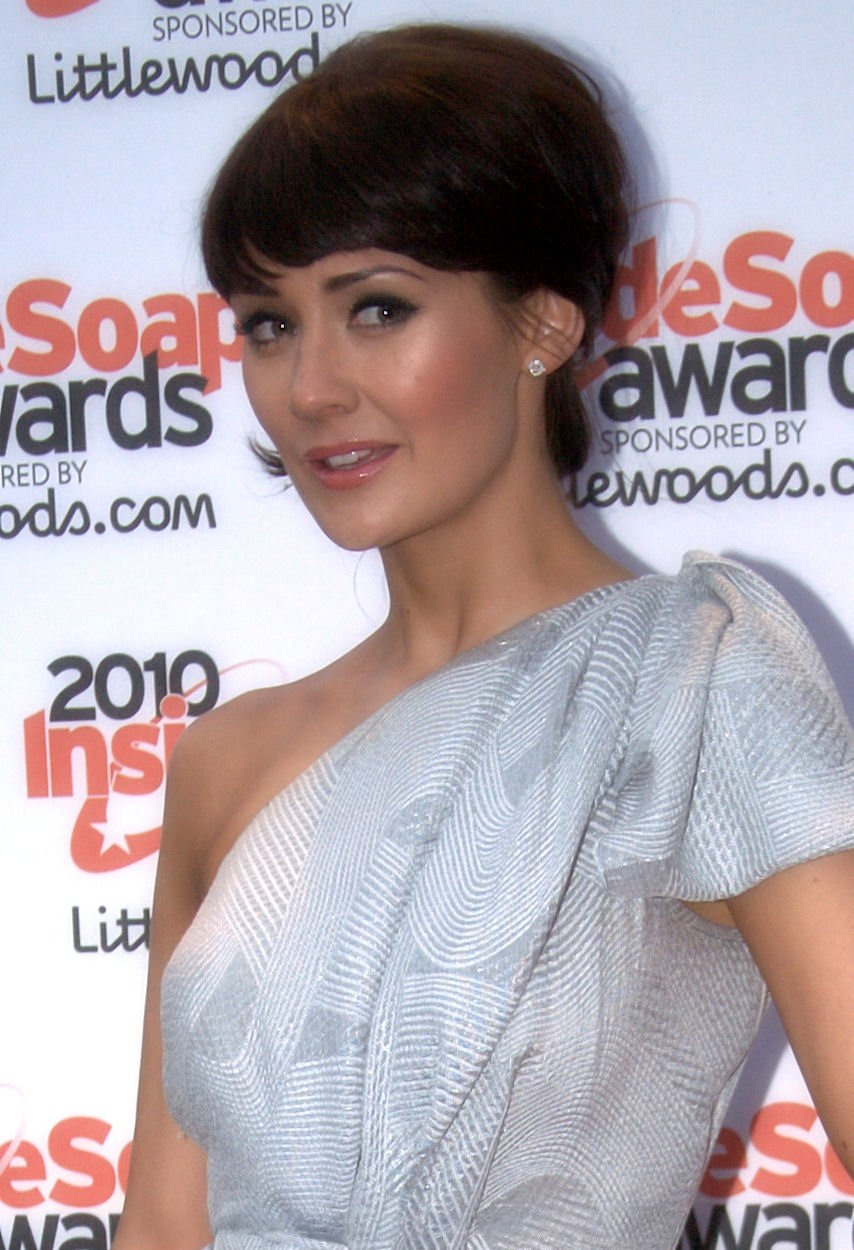
Claire Cooper (pictured) stated that her character Jacqui McQueen is "furious" about Julie's return.

Despite her previous concerns, Buckfield returned once again in 2007. Julie returns to celebrate Tony's thirtieth birthday, during the episode broadcast on 30 October 2007. In the storyline, Tony's girlfriend, Jacqui McQueen (Claire Cooper) and her sister, Tina Reilly (Leah Hackett) compete to throw Tony the best birthday party. Tina decides to invite Tony's ex-girlfriends including Julie, Izzy and Tessie Thompson (Sian Gibson). Cooper told Katy Moon from Inside Soap that Jacqui is "furious" by the arrival of Tony's former love interests.

In 2018, Buckfield reprised the role again and Julie made an unannounced return on 18 September 2018. Julie's return story was linked to her ex-boyfriend, Tony. He stayed with Julie for two months while he came to terms with his daughter, Dee Dee Hutchinson's (Lacey Findlow) illness. Julie's return scene occurs following Ste Hay (Kieron Richardson) making plea video to find Tony, who has gone missing. Tony agrees to meet with Ste but does not show up. Ste searches for Tony by visiting nearby houses and knocks on Julie's door. She lies to Ste that she has not seen Tony, but Ste informs her about Dee Dee's condition. Julie then confronts Tony, who lied to Julie by claiming that Dee Dee has died when he came to stay with her. Julie's surprise return generated viewer commentary on social media website Twitter, where fans expressed their shock at her return. Of her return, Buckfield told Daniel Mansfield from The Hunts Post that "it was lovely to go back after all these years and see the cast, especially Nick Pickard who has always been a good friend."

== Reception ==
A writer from Hull Daily Mail branded Julie a "hopelessly smitten teenager" and another opined Julie learned "the path of true love never runs smoothly." A writer from Kent Evening Post assessed that life was "bleak" for Tony after finding out Julie was unfaithful. They defended Julie adding, "it is not as if he has been exactly blameless over the past few months." Geoffrey Phillips from Evening Standard wrote that "Julie doubts Tony's powers of self-restraint as their wedding day looms. It is impossible for a woman to underestimate men in this department."

Of Julie's 1997's departure, a Huddersfield Daily Examiner reporter stated Buckfield "made a spectacular exit as Julie" leaving Tony at the altar. Inside Soap chose Julie and Tony's wedding episode as their soap "choice" pick of the day. A critic from Reading Evening Post chose Julie and Sarah Andersen's (Anna Martland) pancake race scenes as the newspaper's "pick of the day" feature. A Soaplife critic assessed Julie and Izzy's rivalry, stating "Izzy has a battle of her hands" dealing with Julie. They added that she needed to be and be to play "dirty" because "it's clear that first love Julie doesn't play by the rules." Chris Edwards from Digital Spy wrote that "fans got quite the shock" watching Julie's 2018 return. He added she was a "blast from the past" and Hollyoaks' writers "treated fans" with her return. The Hunts Post's Mansfield assessed that upon her return Julie "was in the thick of things again" with Tony and "viewers were delighted to see her back."
