= Louise Taylor =

Louise Taylor may refer to:

- Louise Taylor (archer) (1870–1966), American archer
- Louise Taylor (Hollyoaks), fictional character
- Louise Taylor (jurist), Australian jurist
- Louise Taylor (singer), an American singer-songwriter.

== See also ==
- Myra Louise Taylor
