= Julie Buckfield =

British actress (born 1976)

Julie Buckfield (born 10 April 1976) is a British actress. A graduate of the Sylvia Young Theatre School in London, she started her career aged 11 in the Cameron Mackintosh production of Les Misérables. She then auditioned for the part of Chrissy Mainwaring in BBC 1 teenage soap Grange Hill, but eventually won the part of Natalie Stevens, for which her twin sister, Clare, had also auditioned. Clare and Julie competed again to replace Georgina Cates in 2point4 Children, but this time Clare got the part over Julie.

Julie went on to play Julie Matthews in Hollyoaks in two periods, from 1995 to 1997 and in 2002 and briefly in 2007 and also briefly in 2018. Buckfield has also appeared in The Bill (two roles, one in 1993 and one in 1998), Pie in the Sky, London's Burning, Expert Witness (TV series), Casualty and Holby City. She presented a summer special with Dave Benson-Phillips for The Disney Club. She played Annie on Channel 4's extr@, a TV program for ESL students.

She has an extensive theatre background, including roles in A Slice of Saturday Night, Passport to Pimlico, Bad Blood, as well as various roles in pantomime. For the past seven years Julie has established herself as a resident panto actor at the Cambridge Arts Theatre in Cambridge.

Julie Buckfield is the Patron of Cambridgeshire Search & Rescue, the county's ALSAR specialist search and rescue unit.
