= Barking! =

- Created by: Georgia Pritchett
- Starring: Katy McGowan; Charles Dale; Robin Weaver; Adam Scourfield; Tom Millner; Linzey Cocker
- Voices of: Will Mellor
- Theme music composer: Rob David; Dan Delor
- Country of origin: United Kingdom
- No. of series: 3
- No. of episodes: 20

Production
- Producer: Pippa Brill
- Production companies: Granada Television; Catherine Bailey Limited

Original release
- Network: ITV (CITV)
- Release: 28 October 2004 – 15 February 2006

Barking! is a British children's television series that produced three series between October 2004 and February 2006. The show was originally broadcast on ITV's children's slot CITV. It was nominated for Best Drama at the 11th British Academy Children's Awards.

All 20 episodes of Barking! were repeated frequently on the CITV channel between 2006 and 2013. In February 2018, a similar show Waffle the Wonder Dog was released on CBeebies.

== Premise ==
The series stars Katy McGowan as Jezza Matthews, a teenage girl with a talking dog named Georgie, voiced by Will Mellor, who was given as a welcome gift by her stepfather, Greg (Charles Dale), when Jezza moved with her family to Devon. Jezza is the only person that knows that Georgie could talk, as they go out on adventures around the fictional town of Stonemoor in Devon, but Georgie always causes mischief and gets Jezza in for the blame, Jezza doesn't mind though as they are still close. Other major characters in the show included Jezza's mother, Pippa (Robin Weaver), and her stepbrothers Dan (Adam Scourfield) and Ollie (Tom Millner).

== Cast ==
- Katy McGowan as Jezza
- Will Mellor as Georgie
- Charles Dale as Greg
- Robin Weaver as Pippa
- Adam Scourfield as Dan
- Tom Millner as Ollie
- Linzey Cocker as Roxy

== Production ==
The series was filmed in the small country market town of Boroughbridge in North Yorkshire.

It was created by Georgia Pritchett and produced by Pippa Brill. The title sequence and design was made and produced by Hello Charlie.

The song composers and producers for the opening sequence were Rob David and Dan Delor who also did composing for other programmes like documentaries for the BBC.
