= Maddie Parker =

UK soap opera character, created 1995

- Hollyoaks character
- Portrayed by: Yasmin Bannerman
- Duration: 1995–1997
- First appearance: 23 October 1995
- Last appearance: 18 August 1997
- Created by: Phil Redmond
- Introduced by: Phil Redmond
In-universe information
- Occupation: Restaurateur

Maddie Parker is a fictional character from the British television soap opera Hollyoaks, portrayed by Yasmin Bannerman. She first appeared on 23 October 1995. She remained in the role until 1997 when she quit the role. Maddie left Hollyoaks on 18 August 1997.

== Casting ==
Hollyoaks initially focused on the lives and loves of seven teenagers living in a fictional suburb of Chester. Maddie was one of the original characters created by Phil Redmond, and she was introduced in the show's first episode, which aired on 23 October 1995. Yasmin Bannerman had appeared in an episode of Crown Prosecutor and a television advert before she auditioned for Hollyoaks. She attended two auditions and was included on a shortlist of 50. Bannerman recalled being told to pack a bag for an overnight stay as the casting process continued for 48 hours. She told Roz Laws of the Birmingham Weekly Mercury: "There were loads of really good-looking people and I was sure I wasn't going to get the part." After being cast as Maddie, Bannerman said that everything happened "so quickly", as she began filming less than a week after her final audition. She had to stay in a Liverpool hotel during filming. She commented that the cast became famous before the serial had even stated due to the vast amount of promotion by Channel 4.

== Development ==
"Maddie, 18, is taking a year off after her A levels. Her mother owns the Interior Design shop where Dawn works and where the two girls first met. Maddie is a dedicated follower of fashion although she is by no means a bimbo."

— A character outline published in the Chester Chronicle (October 1995).

In the book, Phil Redmond's Hollyoaks: The Official Companion, author Matthew Evans described Maddie as "young, free and single, and always on the lookout for a man". The Liverpool Echo described her as "the streetwise and sassy siren who ran Parker's restaurant."

Maddie became known for her bright, revealing clothing. Bannerman was shocked when she saw her character's wardrobe of short skirts and low necklines for the first time. She stated "Her clothes are outrageous – her skirts are incredibly short and you'd get vertigo wearing her shoes. She likes wearing bright pink outfits, which shock the camera crew first thing in the morning." Bannerman did not share Maddie's fashion sense, as she was more conservative and preferred to be more covered up. She said there was "no way" that she would wear some of Maddie's clothes in real life. She admitted that she was "taken aback and rather worried" about Maddie's wardrobe, but as filming went on she started to get used to the pieces and enjoyed dressing up. She told Roz Laws of the Birmingham Weekly Mercury that she would have to watch her weight, as the clothes were "very unforgiving".

In addition to Maddie's wardrobe, Bannerman also made is clear that she did share her character's attitude towards men and relationships. She did not like the way Maddie treated potential love interests, calling her "very brassy and up-front with men." She also did not think she would have the confidence to use some of her character's one-liners. She described Maddie as "very flirtatious" and pointed out that she dates several men at the same time, where as Bannerman preferred more security and had been dating her partner for three years.

== Storylines ==
Maddie's earlier storylines started when she received a creepy Valentine's card, which leads to Maddie being worried that someone might be following her. Soon, Michael, an old flame of Maddie's turns up and gets an unwelcome reception. Maddie began to rekindle her love for Michael, as the pair begins to date and reminisce about better times. However, Maddie gets a bit concerned over his jealous behaviour and dumped him. Maddie later discovered that Michael was mentally ill, after he became highly obsessed with Maddie becoming his wife.

Things begin to get increasingly out of hand, when Michael kidnapped Maddie and her friend Jude Cunningham (Davinia Taylor), and took them hostage. He then drove them to Scotland, ready to marry Maddie. Maddie refused to put on the wedding dress and go through the charade of marriage to Michael, which made Michael mad and he took Jude up to the roof as revenge. For a moment it looked as if Michael was going to push Jude off the roof, but Maddie came up dressed in a wedding dress, and he was distracted. As Jude manages to escape his clutches, Michael fell to his death. Jude than tried to console Maddie over Michael's death but Maddie decided to go away to come to terms with it all. When Maddie returns, she told Jude that she wanted a fresh start by expanding the Parkers. Yet, Maddie still found it hard to get over Michael's death and became increasingly insecure about her safety. Maddie decides the only way she can make a new start is by leaving Hollyoaks, and leaving Parkers in the hands of Jude. She leaves the village to live with her mother.

== Reception ==
Marianna Manson from Closer Online put Maddie on her list of the most iconic black characters in British soap operas, writing, "Maddie was introduced as one of the original cast, and during her time on the show was kidnapped by a mentally unstable ex, Michael, who held her hostage and tried to force her to marry him. Maddie eventually left Hollyoaks in 1997 to start afresh, and we haven't heard from her since."
