= Yasmin Bannerman =

English actress (born 1970)

- Born: 1970 (age 55–56); Gloucester, England
- Education: Rose Bruford College
- Occupation: Actress
- Years active: 1993–present

Yasmin Bannerman (born 1970) is an English actress. Bannerman was born and brought up in Gloucestershire and attended the Rose Bruford College in London until 1993. She has had roles in television series such as Hollyoaks, Cold Feet, Merseybeat and Doctor Who, and in the films Maybe Baby and Killing Me Softly.

== Background ==
Yasmin Bannerman was born and brought up in Gloucester, where she attended St Peter's Roman Catholic School. She spent time acting there and later joined the Everyman Youth Theatre in Cheltenham before beginning a degree in modern European literature at the University of Reading. She dropped out after a year to attend the Rose Bruford College in London, graduating in 1993.

== Career ==
Her first television role came in 1995 when she appeared in an episode of Crown Prosecutor. Shortly afterwards she was cast as Maddie Parker in Channel 4's soap opera Hollyoaks. She describes her role in the soap as "demanding", though the character appeared less frequently as time went on. Further appearances include a brief role in Red Dwarf and a recurring role in the third series of Cold Feet as Jessica Barnes, a local political activist who has an affair with David Marsden (played by Robert Bathurst).

In the same year she appeared in Ben Elton's Maybe Baby as Melinda. Further appearances include roles in Queen of Swords, In Deep, Holby City, Life on Mars, and an eight-episode stint in Merseybeat. In 2005 she played Jabe (an alien that resembles a tree) in the second episode of BBC Wales' revival of Doctor Who. Her audition was "shrouded in secrecy" and the part required a lengthy make-up process; the prosthetics took three hours to apply and 90 minutes to remove. Further involvement in the Doctor Who franchise includes guest roles in the audio dramas The Bride of Peladon and The Fourth Wall, and a part in the Torchwood episode "They Keep Killing Suzie".

In 2015, she played Roz Forrester, a companion of the Seventh Doctor, in three novel adaptations of the Virgin New and Missing Adventures, Damaged Goods, Original Sin and Cold Fusion. These stories were adapted by Big Finish Productions. She later reprised the role in a series of four stories released in November 2018, entitled "The Seventh Doctor: The New Adventures".

In 2017, Bannerman is playing Dayna Mellanby, a character in the Blake's 7 audio adventure series by Big Finish Productions. Bannerman is the third actress to play Dayna following Josette Simon in the television series and Angela Bruce in the BBC Radio series.

== Filmography ==
Year	Title	Role	Other notes
1995	Crown Prosecutor	Marion Hearn	1 episode (Series 1, Episode 4)
1995	Hollyoaks	Maddie Parker	Original cast member (1995–1997)
1999	Red Dwarf	First Ground Controller	1 episode ("Back in the Red, Part 3")
2000	Happy Birthday Shakespeare	Vanessa	
2000	Maybe Baby	Melinda	
2000	Cold Feet	Jessica Barnes	5 episodes (Series 3, Episodes 2, 3, 4, 5 and 7)
2001	Queen of Swords	Agatha	1 episode ("Runaways")
2001	In Deep	Toni Carr	1 episode ("Jekylls, Part 1")
2002	Holby City	Rebecca Arrowsmith	1 episode ("Hello Goodbye")
2002	Killing Me Softly	Joanna	
2002	Merseybeat	Blue McCormack	Main cast member
2005	Doctor Who	Jabe	1 episode ("The End of the World")
2005	55 Degrees North	Jade	2 episodes (Series 1, Episodes 7 and 8)
2006	New Street Law	Elaine Warren	1 episode (Series 1, Episode 8)
2006	Torchwood	Swanson	1 episode ("They Keep Killing Suzie")
2007	Life on Mars	Eve Olawi	1 episode (Series 2, Episode 1)
2007	Life Line	Ruth	
2009	Casualty	Kathy	1 episode ("Who Do You Think You Are?")
