= Will Mellor =

British actor (born 1976)

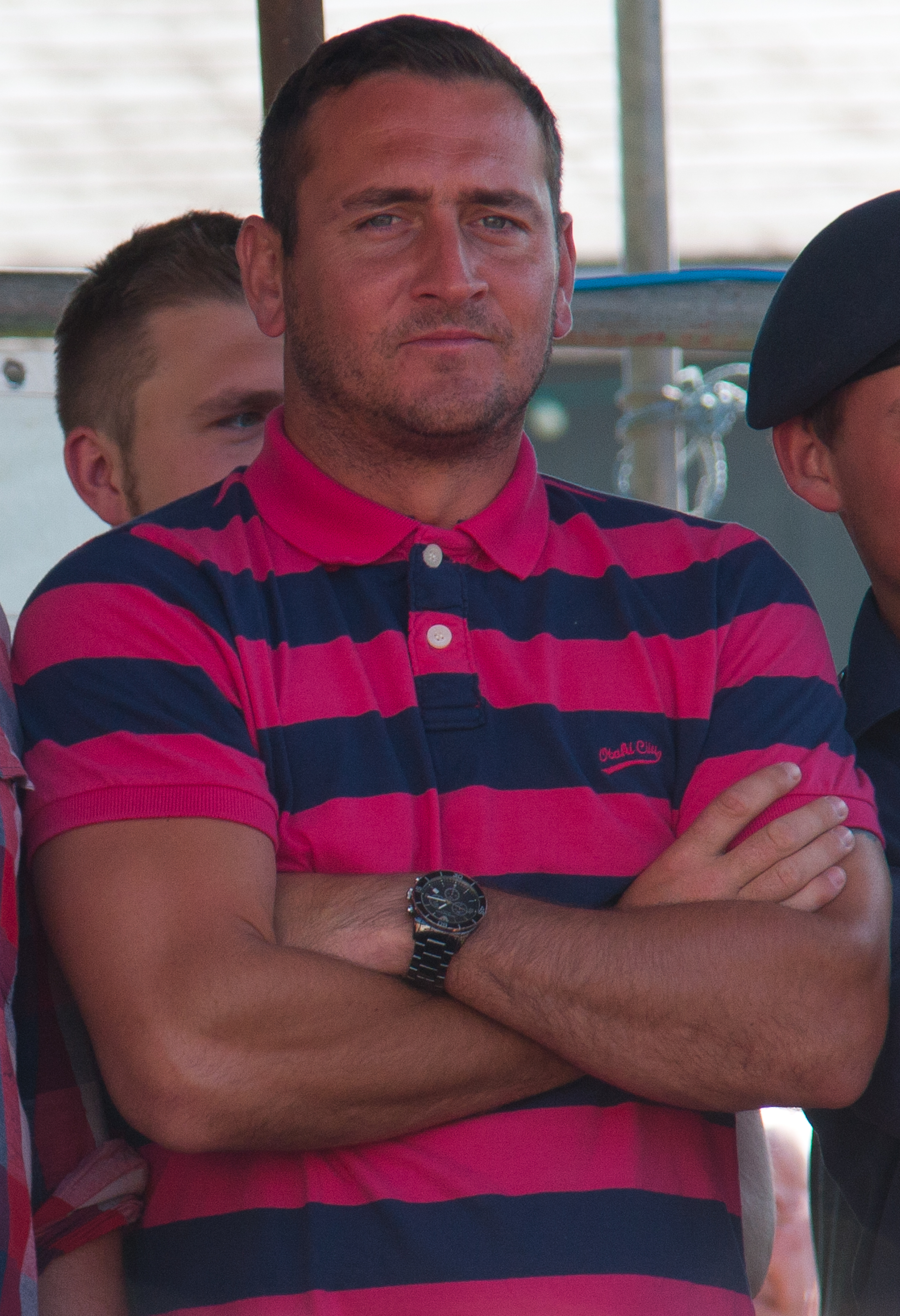
- Mellor in 2012
- Born: William Mellor; 3 April 1976 (age 50); Bredbury, Stockport, Greater Manchester, England
- Occupations: Actor; singer
- Years active: 1990–present
- Spouse: Michelle McSween (m. 2007)
- Children: 2

William Mellor (born 3 April 1976) is an English actor and singer. He is known for his roles as James "Jambo" Bolton in Hollyoaks (1995–1998, 2004), Gaz Wilkinson in Two Pints of Lager and a Packet of Crisps (2001–2011), Jack Vincent in Casualty (2001–2003), DC Spike Tanner in No Offence (2015–2018), Steve Connolly in Broadchurch (2013), the voice of Georgie in Barking! (2004–2006) and Ollie Curry in White Van Man (2011–2012). He appeared in the ITV soap opera Coronation Street as Harvey Gaskell (2021–2022, 2024). In 2024, he appeared as sub-postmaster Lee Castleton in the ITV drama Mr Bates vs The Post Office, about the British Post Office scandal.

== Career ==
Mellor first came to the public's attention in 1990, when he played Ben Rowlingson in the children's programme Children's Ward. In 1992 he played Paul Howard in Brookside. In 1995, he joined the cast of the soap opera Hollyoaks and played James "Jambo" Bolton until 1998. He had a cameo as Jambo in a Christmas edition of Hollyoaks. He released a cover version of Leo Sayer's "When I Need You", which peaked at No. 5 on the UK singles chart, as well as a follow-up single called "No Matter What I Do", which reached No. 23. He also made an appearance in the music video for Boyzone's Comic Relief single "When the Going Gets Tough".

Shortly after, Mellor appeared as Greg in the made-for-TV film Is Harry on the Boat? (2001). He played Jack Vincent in Casualty from 2001 to 2003, and starred as Gaz Wilkinson in the comedy Two Pints of Lager and a Packet of Crisps from 2001 to 2011. Mellor starred as "Barmpot" in the postal worker drama Sorted, and played DC Jed Griffiths in the second series of Murder Investigation Team. In 2004, Mellor provided the voice for Georgie the dog in the CITV series Barking!. He played Tom in the second series of The Street. Mellor won the first series of the BBC singing contest Comic Relief Does Fame Academy in 2003. He made his EastEnders debut on 20 May 2007 playing womanising salesman Warren Stamp.

Mellor was a guest star in the BBC fantasy drama Merlin, playing the villain Valiant in the series second episode of the same name. In October 2008, he starred in The Prisoner, a documentary about prison life. Mellor portrayed Chris in the British horror thriller film The Reeds. Mellor did a brief stint on children's television channel CBeebies, in which he read books for the audience. In 2011, he starred in the BBC Three comedy White Van Man and the BBC One drama Waterloo Road.

From 2011 to 2012, he played Liam Flynn in the BBC One comedy series In with the Flynns, as well as appearing in White Van Man. Mellor had a guest role in the final episode of the BBC Three comedy series Mongrels. In 2013, he played Steve Connolly in the ITV detective drama Broadchurch. In 2014, he appeared on BBC One's Kay Mellor drama series In the Club. In February 2021, it was announced that Mellor would join the cast of Coronation Street as Harvey Gaskell, with his first scenes airing in March. From 24 September 2022, Mellor competed in the twentieth series of Strictly Come Dancing, partnered with the Chinese dancer and choreographer Nancy Xu. The couple made it to the semi-finals, but were eliminated on 12 December 2022, finishing in fifth place.

In 2024, he appeared as sub-postmaster Lee Castleton in the ITV drama Mr Bates vs The Post Office, about the British Post Office scandal. He later criticised the Post Office CEO Paula Vennells for a lack of "humanity" during the scandal.

In May 2025, Mellor performed the song "Bring Him Home" from Les Misérables at Gorton Monastery in Manchester, in aid of the charity When You Wish Upon a Star. He released a studio recorded version as a single, which debuted at No. 18 on the UK Singles Downloads Chart.

== Personal life ==
Mellor met the dancer Michelle McSween when they starred together in the stage musical Oh, What a Night in 1999. They married in 2007, and have two children. In 2020, in a podcast with fellow actor and friend Ralf Little, Mellor discussed his struggle with depression after the death of his sister six years prior. Mellor's father Bill died in 2020, during the COVID-19 pandemic, two weeks after being diagnosed with cancer. In week 8 of Strictly Come Dancing, on 12 November 2022, Mellor danced a waltz to the Commodores' song "Three Times a Lady", as a tribute to his father.

== Filmography ==
=== Film ===
Year	Title	Role	Notes
2000	Justified Technophobe	David	Short film
2008	Miss Conception	Brian	
2010	The Reeds	Chris	
2018	Viking Destiny	Lord Soini	Also known as Of Gods and Warriors
2021	Me, Myself and Di	Robbie – Orange Coat	

=== Television ===
Year	Title	Role	Notes
1990	Children's Ward	Ben Rowlingson	Series 3; 5 episodes. Credited as William Mellor
1992	Brookside	Paul Howard	4 episodes
1995–1998, 2004	Hollyoaks	James "Jambo" Bolton	Series regular; 85 episodes
1998–1999	Night Fever	Himself – Co-host	Series 2 & 3; 17 episodes
1999	Harbour Lights	Granger	Series 1; episode 7: "Stranded"
2000	Fat Friends	Gareth	Series 1; episode 3: "Fat Free"
2001	Is Harry on the Boat?	Greg	Television film
2001–2003	Casualty	Jack Vincent	Regular role. Series 15–17; 72 episodes
2001–2011	Two Pints of Lager and a Packet of Crisps	Gaz Wilkinson	Regular role. Series 1–9; 79 episodes
2004–2006	Barking!	Georgie (voice)	Series 1–3; 20 episodes
2005	Murder Investigation Team	DC Jed Griffiths	Series 2; episodes 1–4
2005	Where the Heart Is	Ed	Series 9; episode 8: "Peaches and Cream"
2005	Stars in Their Eyes	Himself / George Michael	Celebrity Special 3
2006	Sorted	Barmpot	Episodes 1–6
2007	Agatha Christie's Marple	Martin Waddy	Series 3; episode 4: "Nemesis"
2007	Director's Debut	Jed Warner	Episode 2: "Baby Boom"
2007	EastEnders	Warren Stamp	4 episodes
2007	The Street	Tom	Series 2; episode 3: "Demolition"
2008	Harley Street	Joe Lacey	Episode 1
2008	Merlin	Knight Valiant	Series 1; episode 2: "Valiant"
2009	Unforgiven	Bradley	Mini-series; episodes: "Part One" and "Part Two"
2010	World's Toughest Driving Tests	Himself – Presenter	Episodes 1–6
2011	Mongrels	Himself	Series 2; episode 9: "Miquita and the Obligatory Clips Show"
2011	Waterloo Road	Dan Hargrove	Series 6; episode 18
2011	All Star Family Fortunes	Himself – Contestant	Series 6; episode 3: "Lisa Snowdon vs Will Mellor"
2011–2012	White Van Man	Ollie Curry	Series 1 & 2; 13 episodes
2011–2012	In with the Flynns	Liam Flynn	Series 1 & 2; 12 episodes
2013	All Star Mr & Mrs	Himself – Contestant	Series 5; episode 4
2013	Broadchurch	Steve Connelly	Main cast member; series 1; 7 episodes
2013	Dates	David	Episodes 1, 5 & 9
2013	Big Star's Little Star	Himself – Contestant	Series 1; episode 1
2014–2016	In the Club	Rick	Main cast member; series 1 & 2; 12 episodes
2015	Death in Paradise	Karl Slater	Series 4; episode 2: "Hidden Secrets"
2015	The Job Lot	Greg	Series 3; episode 5
2015–2018	No Offence	DC Spike Tanner	Main cast member; series 1–3; 21 episodes
2016	Line of Duty	PC Rod Kennedy	Series 3; episodes 1 & 2: "Monsters" and "The Process"
2017	The Keith & Paddy Picture Show	Dr. Egon Spengler Replacement 2	Series 1; episode 2: "Ghostbusters"
2019	Sanctuary	Redpath	Episodes 1–8
2019	MyBad!	Davey Dave	Television film
2021–2022, 2024	Coronation Street	Harvey Gaskell	53 episodes
2022	Strictly Come Dancing	Himself – Contestant	Series 20
2023	Cops Who Kill with Will Mellor	Himself – Presenter	Episodes 1–8
2024	Mr Bates vs The Post Office	Lee Castleton	Mini-series; episodes 1–4
2024	The Teacher	Jimmy Spencer	Series 2; episodes 1–4
2024–present	Will & Ralf Should Know Better	Himself	Mini-series
2026	A Woman of Substance	Jack Harte	

=== Guest appearances ===
- Test the Nation: The Popular Music Test (4 September 2004) – Guest
- I Love My Country (28 September 2013) – Guest
- Through the Keyhole (2014, 2017) – Homeowner / Panellist
- Celebrity Juice (2015–2022) – Guest (25 episodes)
- A Question of Sport (2022) – Panellist
- Would I Lie to You? (2024) – Guest

== Awards and nominations ==
Year	Award	Category	Work	Result	Ref.
2003	9th National Television Awards	Most Popular Actor	Casualty	Nominated	
2015	TV Choice Awards	Best Actor	In the Club	Nominated	
2021	Inside Soap Awards	Best Villain	Coronation Street	Nominated	

Preceded by None	Comic Relief Does Fame Academy Winner; Series 1 (2003)	Succeeded by Edith Bowman
