= Jambo Bolton =

- Hollyoaks character
- Portrayed by: Will Mellor
- Duration: 1995–1998, 2004
- First appearance: 23 October 1995
- Last appearance: 22 December 2004
- Created by: Phil Redmond
- Introduced by: Phil Redmond (1995); Jo Hallows (2004)
In-universe information
- Occupation: Garden centre general assistant Landscaper
- Father: Jeff Bolton
- Mother: Janice Bolton

James "Jambo" Bolton is a fictional character from the British television soap opera Hollyoaks, played by Will Mellor. He made his first appearance during the episode broadcast on 23 October 1995. Jambo was one of the show's original characters. Mellor left the cast in 1998. In 2004, Mellor reprised his role briefly for a Christmas special episode.

== Casting ==
Hollyoaks initially focused on the lives and loves of seven teenagers living in a fictional suburb of Chester. Jambo was one of the original characters created by Phil Redmond, and he was introduced in the show's first episode, which aired on 23 October 1995. Will Mellor had previously appeared in Children's Ward and Redmond's Brookside, before he was cast as Jambo. He admitted to being nervous when he went up for the role. He attended four auditions and got down to the last two, before being told that he had won the part. Speaking to the Liverpool Echo's Peter Grant, Mellor said that when he went home to tell his family the news, they had all gone out and he had to celebrate alone. He continued "But really, it still hasn't sunk in. I'm so lucky – considering all the thousands who went for the auditions." Mellor stated that Hollyoaks was his "dream job", especially as he and his character were very similar.

== Development ==
"James, 18, enjoys a punch-up and is a wild, wacky individualist. Never one to follow fashion or wear designer labels he always goes his own way. Despite appearances, though, he is conscientious and works hard as a general assistant at a garden centre."

— Jambo's character outline published in the Chester Chronicle (October 1995).

Jambo is described as having an "idiosyncratic approach to life – he disliked convention and had a naturally inquisitive mind, often pondering on life's little mysteries, such as the theory of tumbling toast". Peter Grant of the Liverpool Echo described him as "the happy-go-lucky jack-the-lad with an eye for the ladies". The character's trademark is his "closely cropped, dyed-hair" and he is often seen hanging out of a car sunroof while traveling. Jambo initially works as a general assistant at a garden centre, along with his mother. Mellor found his character easy to play as he saw a lot of himself in Jambo. He was often told that he was playing himself – "a typical Northern lad." He explained that both he and Jambo liked to mess around and have a laugh, although Jambo was "a more magnified version" of himself and "a bit more outrageous". Mellor liked that his character was able to show his serious and thoughtful sides though. Mellor also stated "Jambo's someone who doesn't go out of his way to impress people, but who will show a sensitive side when he has to. Everything I do as me he seems to be doing too. It's really good that the scriptwriters are writing him for me that way." Grant called the character "the anti-hero who does everything differently."

The character's early storylines established that he has bad luck with women. In scenes set during New Year Eve 1995, Jambo tries to change his luck by donning a homemade "lucky snogging helmet" in order to find someone to kiss. Mellor told an Inside Soap writer that "Jambo just isn't one for the women. They like to have a laugh with him, but that's as far as it goes." He called Jambo the "joker in the pack" and said that he wishes the girls would take him more seriously, but deep down he knows that they do not.

In June 1998, Mellor confirmed he was leaving Hollyoaks to continue pursuing his music career. Mellor told Mark Goodier that his character would not be killed off and his exit would allow him to return if he wanted. Mellor later stated: "I've been there for three years and there's other things I want to do. Obviously pop music is important to me at the moment. I want to concentrate on getting my album out." His final scenes aired on 6 August 1998, as Jambo leaves behind his friends in Chester to move to Anglesey for work.

Writers developed a relationship between Jambo and Dawn Cunningham (Lisa Williamson). The show's executive producer Jo Hallows told Wendy Granditer from Inside Soap that Dawn and Jambo's relationship was filled with "lovely stuff". She believed it was "a relationship that viewers really cared about" which made Dawn's death from leukaemia "all the more devastating".

Mellor agreed to reprise his role for a one-off appearance on 22 December 2004. In a take on A Christmas Carol, Jambo returns to take the Scrooge-like Tony Hutchinson (Nick Pickard) on a tour of his friends and family. Mellor explained that when Tony wakes to find Jambo in bed next to him, he worries that he has died, until Jambo tells him that he has been sent to show Tony the error of his ways. Mellor continued: "Jambo knows Tony is a good person deep down, and wants to show him that his actions have a lasting effect on others." Jambo leaves after showing Tony a look at his future, hoping that it will lead to Tony changing his ways. Mellor enjoyed his return to Hollyoaks, as the "surreal" nature of the episode allowed him to have fun with his role. He ruled out a permanent return to the serial due to his busy acting career.

== Storylines ==
Jambo was an individualist, putting his unique stamp on anything that came his way, from his formula for salty vinegar and his devotion to Margaret the cow. Jambo had a penchant for climbing through windows, yet, as he argued, "Why walk round to the door when the window is right in front of you?". Jambo was good friends with Kurt Benson and Tony Hutchinson and, whilst they were often confused by his odd behaviour, the three formed a strong bond, providing one another with support and, very often, humour needed to get through their rather tumultuous lives.

Meanwhile, Kurt was soon paired off with Ruth Osborne and Tony was hopelessly in love with Julie Matthews. Jambo was often left on the sidelines, unlucky in love and unable to act on the feelings he had for Dawn. After countless missed opportunities as well as Jambo's brief relationship with Carol Groves's sister, Anita and his stepmother Lisa, Dawn and Jambo finally admitted their feelings for each other. The other woman in Jambo’s life was his Bond Bug Beryl, whom he loved and cherished almost as much as Dawn. Tragically, Jambo's romance with Dawn was short-lived, as she was diagnosed with leukaemia. She eventually lost her battle against the disease, leaving Jambo devastated over the loss of his girl he wanted more than anything else in the world. Jambo never got over the death of Dawn and, although he tried to persevere with his new landscaping business, '‘Dig It!’, he decided that there were too many memories of Dawn in Hollyoaks and he wanted to move on.

However, Jambo certainly left the female population of Hollyoaks with a memory they would cherish, when he was the unwilling stripper at Jude's opening night at the Parkers. Jambo finally bid farewell to Hollyoaks to begin a new life in Anglesey, but made one final visit to Hollyoaks to put flowers on Dawn's grave and vowed never to return. Jambo reappeared when the gang went to a trip to Anglesey to visit him. At Christmas 2004, Jambo appears as a vision to Tony Hutchinson to show him the error of his ways. Tony later confirms that Jambo was not a ghost after contacting him. Years later, Tony hears from Jambo when he apologises for not being able to attend his surprise birthday party.

== Reception ==
Mellor was surprised that Jambo became "a cult figure" among viewers and he said he received lots of fan mail. On the character Sky said "Way hey... it's Jambo Bolton, do you remember his earring? He was one of the originals and also one of our faves". What's on TV placed him in their list of "The Top 100 Soap Hunks of All Time". Elizabeth Joyce of the Shropshire Star said that Jambo was a "decent" and "genuinely memorable character" who still holds "a place in the heart of many a late-twentysomething".

Johnathon Hughes of Digital Spy included Jambo in his list of "15 dream comebacks we'd love to see" in 2016. He wrote: "Tony would be proper chuffed if James 'Jambo' Bolton (Hollyoaks loved their comedy nicknames, didn't they?) came home – for a start Tone wouldn't be the only original cast member anymore." Hughes thought a return would be unlikely due to Mellor's busy work schedule. He added that the character was not dead despite it seeming that way due to his last appearance in a dream sequence as a ghost. Hughes' colleague, Adam Beresford, called Jambo "Cheeky chappy". Francesca Babb from All About Soap opined that "cheeky chappy Jambo was one of our favourite Hollyoaks boys until a short-lived singing career whisked the actor away from Soapland."
