= Hollyoaks =

British television soap opera (since 1995)

- Genre: Soap opera
- Created by: Phil Redmond
- Written by: Various
- Directed by: Various
- Starring: Regular and recurring cast
- Country of origin: United Kingdom
- Original language: English
- No. of episodes: 6718

Production
- Executive producers: Currently: Hannah Cheers; Previously: Phil Redmond; Jo Hallows; Carolyn Reynolds; Tony Wood; Bryan Kirkwood; Lee Hardman; Emma Smithwick; Lucy Allan; Angelo Abela
- Production locations: Childwall, Liverpool, England
- Editors: Alistair McMath; David Mercer
- Camera setup: Single-camera setup
- Running time: 23 minutes (1995–2024); 20 minutes (2024–present)
- Production company: Lime Pictures

Original release
- Network: Channel 4 (network) (1995–2023); E4 (2005–present); Channel 4 (streaming service) (2022–present); YouTube (2023–present)
- Release: 23 October 1995 – present

Related
- Brookside; Hollyoaks: In the City; Hollyoaks Later

Hollyoaks is a British soap opera which originally began on Channel 4 on 23 October 1995. It was created by Phil Redmond, who had previously conceived the soap opera Brookside and the hit BBC children's television drama series, Grange Hill. From 2005 to 2023, episodes aired on sister channel E4 a day prior to their broadcast on Channel 4. In 2023, Hollyoaks was removed from Channel 4's early evening schedule, but remains on E4 and Channel 4's on demand service with episodes now uploaded to YouTube.

At its inception, the soap was targeted towards an adolescent and young adult audience but it has since broadened its appeal to all age groups. Hollyoaks has covered various taboo subjects rarely seen on British television, for which it has received numerous awards. It has won the award for British Soap Award for Best British Soap twice, in 2014 and 2019; its first win broke the 15-year tie between rival soap operas EastEnders and Coronation Street. Beginning with a cast of 15 characters, it now has 38 regular cast members. The longest-serving actor is Nick Pickard, who has portrayed Tony Hutchinson since the first episode.

== Characters ==
In its first episode, Hollyoaks began with a cast of fifteen, seven of whom were teenagers that received the main focus of the soap. These teenagers were Kurt Benson (Jeremy Edwards), Jambo Bolton (Will Mellor), Natasha Andersen (Shebah Ronay), Louise Taylor (Brett O'Brien), Maddie Parker (Yasmin Bannerman), Dawn Cunningham (Lisa Williamson), and Tony Hutchinson (Nick Pickard); all of these but Pickard departed the series prior to 2000. Pickard stated that he was only signed for 26 episodes and exclaimed his joy at having appeared on the show since its inception. In more recent years, the cast has increased to typically 50 cast members, with the increase of castings being accredited to being a fast-paced soap.

== Production ==
=== Production team ===
Bryan Kirkwood joined the show as executive producer in 2006, but left three years later to become producer of EastEnders. After he left his role in 2009, a number of producers worked on the show, resulting in a number of creative reinventions and changes in direction during this time. Lucy Allan was named as Kirkwood's successor. In 2010, Allan announced she was to step down from the series after only a year, being replaced by Paul Marquess. Speaking of her decision, Allan stated: "I am very proud to have been part of the Hollyoaks team. I've had a fantastic time working on this show but am now equally excited about what the future will hold." On his upcoming role of series producer, Marquess said: "Taking up this position at Lime Pictures feels like I'm going home, as I began my career working with both Carolyn [Reynolds] and Tony [Wood] at Granada and my first major project was Brookside at Mersey Television. I'm a huge soap fan so to be handed the reins of Channel 4's flagship teen drama is not only a huge challenge but also a massive honour." Lime Pictures creative director Tony Wood added: "I'd like to thank Lucy Allan for making such a contribution to Hollyoaks over the years and wish her well for the future. It's very exciting to be working with Paul Marquess again. He's one of the best showrunners in the business. This is a brilliant appointment for Hollyoaks."

Only one day after being announced as the new producer, Marquess began work on the soap opera. A Channel 4 spokesperson stated: "It's all been a very quick turnaround at the top. It was announced in January 2011 that Marquess would leave his role as series producer and would be succeeded by Hollyoaks production team member Gareth Philips. Discussing the news, Philips said: "I have really enjoyed working in the script team at Hollyoaks and it will be a huge honour to take the reins of Channel 4's flagship youth drama. I am very excited about taking the show even further this year with more compelling and brave stories." Emma Smithwick later replaced Philips in autumn 2011. In late-September 2012, it was announced that Kirkwood would be returning to Hollyoaks, replacing Smithwick. On 3 September 2020, Kirkwood announced his exit as showrunner. In a statement, he said: "For many years I have had the privilege of running a soap opera with a fiercely loyal audience. I passionately believe that soaps can help viewers start serious conversations about their lives and in recent years we have covered important topics within mental health, sexual consent, Far-Right radicalisation, male rape, sexual abuse and many issues other shows might look away from." Channel 4's director of programmes, Ian Katz, thanked Kirkwood for his work, stating: "I'm immensely grateful for his steering of the show safely back to screen next week and leaving it in top creative form and I wish him all the best for his next chapter." Allan was again named as Kirkwood's successor. Kirkwood's final episode as executive producer aired on 30 July 2021, with Allan's episodes airing from 2 August 2021. Two years into her tenure, Allan was sacked alongside series producer Philip Dodds and script and storyline executive Josie Day. Hannah Cheers and Angelo Abela were named as successors to Allan, serving as acting executive producers until a permanent replacement is named. Allan's final episode as executive producer aired on 8 November 2023, with Cheers and Abela's episodes airing from 9 November 2023.

In October 2026, it was announced that Cheers had been promoted to the newly-created role of creative director at Lime Pictures and would exit the role of executive producer at Hollyoaks. Series producer, Si Wall, was named as Cheers's successor.

=== Filming locations ===
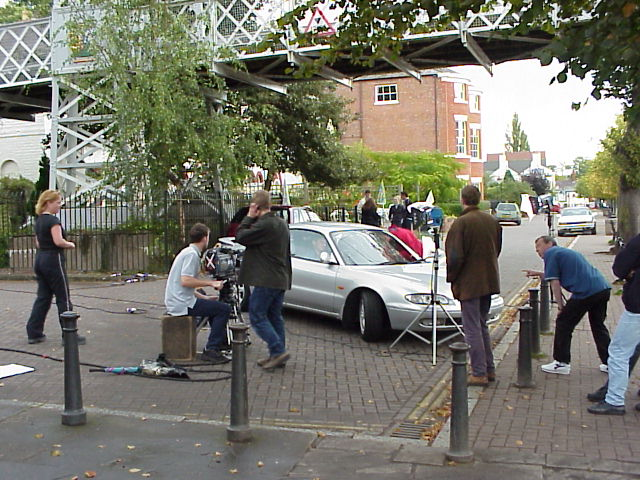
A scene from Hollyoaks being filmed on location at The Groves (pictured) in Chester in 1999

Although set in Chester, the majority of Hollyoaks is filmed at Lime Pictures' studios in Childwall, Liverpool. In the early years, location scenes were filmed around the city and at The Groves next to the River Dee in Chester, but it became too expensive for the filming operations to be moved from Liverpool to Chester for every filming block, resulting in most filming being made at the Childwall studios. Hollyoaks is produced by Lime Pictures (formerly known as Mersey Television prior to its takeover by All3Media).

=== Opening titles and tune ===
The original opening theme tune was written and performed by Steve Wright, who has also produced music and themes for Brookside and Grange Hill. In 2007, Hollyoaks' opening titles were revamped and a new theme tune was introduced. The show's graphic designer Simon Cox created the visuals and their composer Steve Wright remixed the theme tune. The show's executive producer, Bryan Kirkwood changed the titles to "reflect" how the show had changed and "appeal" more to their viewers with a "young, glamorous and sexy" theme. They debuted on 26 February 2007.

It was announced on 19 June 2010 that new titles with a new theme tune, which was reportedly "slowed right down", would be used in new series producer Paul Marquess's first episode, which aired on 5 July 2010. However, on 2 July, the titles were delayed for one week. The titles were then delayed for a second time due to "technical difficulties". On 10 September 2010, Channel 4 confirmed the new Hollyoaks titles and theme music would air from 13 September. However, the titles were different from pictures of filming of the original credits, suggesting a reshoot was the reason for the delay. Marquess commented: "We're very excited about the new titles that the viewers will see on Channel 4 on Monday. They're glossy, contemporary and very Hollyoaks." He then apologised for the delay, saying: "We're sorry to the fans who have been waiting to see them, but they've taken a while to perfect. I'm very happy with them and I hope that the fans like the new-look show." On 28 December 2012, new titles were added, with purple screen replaced by grey screen.

It was announced in August 2016 that a new title sequence would begin airing from 5 September 2016, which would launch the show's "action-packed autumn storyline". The new title sequence features shots of characters on the show's set. Executive producer Bryan Kirkwood said of the titles, "I am thrilled with the new titles. I think they are vibrant, fun and glossy and from the first opening guitar riff feel completely Hollyoaks." Shots from the new title sequence included Ste Hay (Kieron Richardson) riding a carousel with his children, Leah Barnes (Ela-May Dermican) and Lucas Hay (William Hall), Sienna Blake (Anna Passey) lying on a bed of petals, and Mercedes McQueen (Jennifer Metcalfe) appearing in the village dressed in a "striking red dress". On 13 May 2019, a new title sequence, as well as altered theme music, was launched; for the new sequence, a "family theme, putting each of the soap's iconic families front and centre" are seen on the series's set. In January 2021, the titles were updated again to represent new characters that had joined the series. In January 2022, new titles premiered to represent the introduction of several new characters and the departure of numerous others. Speaking on the new titles, executive producer Lucy Allan explained that she wanted them to "highlight the optimism of a place like Hollyoaks – in spite of all the murders!"

=== Music ===
Hollyoaks is the one of only two British soaps to make regular use of incidental music (the other being the Welsh language soap Rownd a Rownd on S4C). A number of real acts have also performed during transmitted episodes of the series. The Alphites were the first band to perform on the programme, when they played in the SU Bar. In 2003, Pop Idol runner up Darius Campbell appeared in an episode performing at a graduation ball. In 2008, the band Get Cape. Wear Cape. Fly also featured in Hollyoaks, performing as part of a Battle of the Bands contest. During November 2008, The Saturdays were featured in two episodes of spin-off Hollyoaks Later. In 2009, McFly featured in the show and played a song in the SU Bar. They also had speaking roles and convinced characters Justin Burton (Chris Fountain) and Hannah Ashworth (Emma Rigby) to date. Later that year, Girls Can't Catch performed "Keep Your Head Up" during the college graduation party. In July 2013, Hollyoaks also featured 'Off The Wall Oompah' Band Hosen Brass, playing a selection of their own cover versions for Darren's Bavarian Night(s) at the Dog In The Pond. Hosen Brass featured on two consecutive episodes over the Friday and the Monday evening.

=== Sponsorship ===
Hollyoaks was initially sponsored by Nescafé, which held a one-year £9.5 million deal from June 2002 until July 2003. The show did not have a sponsor until June 2005, when Wrigley's signed a twelve-month contract for their brand of Extra chewing gum. The contract ended in December 2009. Nikon Coolpix signed a deal for sponsorship in 2010 which ended in September 2010, before resuming in January 2011, as part of a 12-month deal. Nikon group marketing manager, Jeremy Gilbert described Hollyoaks viewers as "the perfect demographic" In September 2010, it was announced mobile phone retailer Phones4u would take over sponsorship from 1 October 2010 as part of a 3-month deal. Caspar Nelson, the head of brand communications at Phones4u, said their research had shown that Hollyoaks was the most-watched TV show for their target audience.

Nikon Coolpix signed a new 12-month sponsorship deal in December 2010, beginning in January 2011. On 11 April 2012, a six-month product placement deal with L'Oréal was revealed. On 31 May 2012, a four-month product placement deal with Nokia was announced. Unilever took over sponsorship of the show from 2 January 2013, with sponsorship switching between its Impulse body spray brand and its Alberto VO5 brand. In January 2015, Domino's Pizza were announced as the new sponsors of Hollyoaks. Five years later, it was announced that Batiste Dry Shampoo had begun sponsoring the programme. In mid November 2020, clothing brand Jack Wills became the sponsor of the soap.

Start of sponsorship	End of sponsorship	Brand
2002	2003	Nescafé
2005	2009	Wrigley's Extra
2010		Nikon Coolpix
2010	2011	Phones 4u
2011	2013	Nikon Coolpix
2013	2014	Unilever
2014	2015	VO5
2015	2020	Domino's Pizza
2020		Batiste Dry Shampoo
2021		Vinted
2022	2023	Gumtree
2023	2024	Vinted
2024	2025	ClearScore

== Broadcast ==
=== United Kingdom ===
The series initially aired on Mondays in 1995, with the exception of the second episode which aired on Friday 27 October 1995 and was repeated on Sunday evenings. In July 1996, Mersey TV opted to recommission the show and increase its output to twice a week, beginning that October with a Thursday episode. A third episode was introduced in September 1999, airing on Wednesdays and a fourth in 2001. In November 2003, following the cancellation of Brookside, the show increased its output with a fifth episode, which has remained until March 2020.

Since the channel's free-to-air launch in May 2005, Channel 4's digital sister station E4 airs a daily "First Look" feature at 19:00 each weekday, in which viewers are able to watch the episode to be shown on Channel 4 the following day (or Monday for the Friday 'first-look'). The 'first-look' is occasionally omitted, primarily if the following day's C4 episode is a special or event edition, and on these occasions may be replaced with a related programme or special.

Repeats of each day's edition of Hollyoaks air on E4 the following weekday; as of 2021, it is shown at 06:00. All of the week's episodes of Hollyoaks are also compiled into an omnibus on Channel 4, and as of 2020, a signed and audio described version is transmitted at 02:25, and a regular version at 06:00. Episodes of Hollyoaks, including the weekly omnibus, are also available for catch-up viewing online through the Channel 4 streaming platform. From 2009 to 2012, the series also broadcast on YouTube, after Google reached a three-year deal with Channel 4. In 2019, Hollyoaks became the first soap opera to release a boxset of episodes onto a streaming service. The soap released their Christmas and New Year's episodes on Channel 4's in-house streaming service Channel 4 and they have continued this practice each December since.

On 22 March 2020, Channel 4 suspended production and filming of Hollyoaks due to the COVID-19 pandemic. From 30 March, new episodes being broadcast was reduced from five to three, airing on Monday, Tuesday and Wednesday. However, on 6 April, this was reduced again from three to two, airing Monday and Tuesday, with the final pre-COVID episode screening on Monday 20 July. The slots belonging to new episodes on E4 were filled by Hollyoaks Favourites. After the resumption of production, producers stated they expect to return to five weekly episodes in 2021.

In June 2020, episodes of Hollyoaks were made available on social media platform Snapchat. In February 2022, it was announced by Channel 4 that new episodes of Hollyoaks would premiere on All 4 (now Channel 4) prior to their broadcast on television. They confirmed that the changes would take place from March 2022 and that each episode would become available in the early morning of each weekday. In September 2023, broadcast became again more digitally focused when it was announced that Hollyoaks was to be removed from Channel 4's schedule, but would remain on E4 and streaming services. They also began premiering episodes on YouTube.

On 29 February 2024, it was announced by Channel 4 that Hollyoaks will have its weekly episode count reduced from five to three episodes a week starting from September 2024. It was confirmed that this reduced output of scheduled episodes will have an effect on cast and crew cuts with approximately 135 job cuts and losses, because of this production and filming of Hollyoaks had been suspended and halted for the remainder of the day. Stephanie Waring, who played Cindy Cunningham, the show's longest-serving female character, since 1996, was the first cast member to reveal she had lost her job as a result of the budget cuts.

On 27 August 2024, Hollyoaks released its autumn 2024 preview trailer whilst also confirming its new schedule within its reduced episode format to three episodes a week airing on Monday, Tuesday and Wednesday starting from its stunt week from 9 September 2024 followed by a one-year time jump the following week from 16 September 2024. Prior to these changes Hollyoaks will air a final full week of episodes Monday to Friday with a six episode special week for the week of 2 September 2024.

=== International broadcast ===
In New Zealand, the show aired on TV1, TV2 and C4. In Australia, from October 2010 to January 2012, the digital multichannel 7Two had broadcast double episodes of Hollyoaks from September 2009. Previously, in the United States, beginning in March 2014, the streaming service Hulu began adding episodes of Hollyoaks; episodes were uploaded to the service two weeks after their initial airing in the UK. However, in November 2023, Hulu announced that they have stopped adding new episodes after stating that they had lost the rights to the series and all episodes had disappeared from the platform. In France, the soap airs dubbed in French on TF1 Séries Films under the title Hollyoaks, l'amour mode d'emploi. In North Macedonia, the series currently airs on A2 Televizija since its 2025 relaunch, starting with the 3500th episode.

== Storylines ==
Over the course of the series's history, Hollyoaks has dealt with a number of storylines based upon serious issues. Given the large and established proportion of young viewers, some feel that the soap opera is an ideal platform to show a variety of issues affecting young people. Earlier episodes were focused on partying and relationships, but the focus quickly went onto issue-led storylines including mental health, rape and self-harm. Hollyoaks has become notable for being the first soap to address various social issues. Series producer Iain MacLeod explained that despite having a tea-time timeslot, they continue to push important social issues as he felt it would be "patronising" to do otherwise. Despite feeling a responsibility to cover these issues, MacLeod also liked that Hollyoaks mixes in serious scenes with comedic and lighthearted scenes. It has been noted that Hollyoaks storylines have a fast pace, which some viewers enjoy.

A 2007 episode which showed a number of the characters falling ill at a party due to carbon monoxide poisoning helped make a viewer realise that the symptoms of illness she had been feeling were caused by a potentially fatal carbon monoxide leak in her home. By being made aware of the effects from the episode, she was able to receive medical treatment that saved her life. Hollyoaks was the first British soap opera to have a "non-linear" week. Commencing 14 September 2009, the special week saw storylines being played out in non-chronological order, something which has never been dealt with within the soap's history. Producer Lucy Allan stated in an interview with Digital Spy, "It was an idea pitched by Richard Burke, one of our writers, at my first long-term story conference back in February. What's great about it is that it's a really great storyline, but with the way he pitched – in making it non-linear – it was even better. It's just like if something happened to one of your mates and you try and put the pieces of the puzzle together as to what happened, you don't find all the people who tell you what happened in chronological order. You get bits here and there and piece it together. It's exactly the sort of thing Hollyoaks should be doing, challenging its audience." In late 2009, it was announced that Hollyoaks would make another soap first by screening a flashforward episode. On 21 December 2009, the series's time-line moved forward six months into May 2010. The episode featured the second wedding of Calvin Valentine and Carmel McQueen. Series producer Lucy Allan stated: "We're really excited by this future episode – Hollyoaks is the only soap that can tamper with time and give our audience the opportunity to look at events that haven't yet taken place. A lot can happen in six months, so viewers should expect to be asking a lot of questions of some of their favourite characters' actions and behaviour." Ricky Whittle, who plays Calvin, added: "Calvin's completely besotted with Carmel. She's the one he's always wanted – she's always been his true love since they first started seeing each other and everyone's always wanted them to get back together."

Later in September, it was announced that Hollyoaks, teaming up with Channel 4 Education's Battlefront, would explore an underage sex storyline involving 12-year-old characters Finn O'Connor (Connor Wilkinson) and Amber Sharpe (Lydia Lloyd-Henry), which would lead to Amber's pregnancy. Explaining the storyline, Paul Marquess said: "Hollyoaks has long been credited for tackling difficult issues that affect young people in a sensitive and intelligent way. I am very proud that we are once again bringing to the forefront a subject for our young audience that many parents, politicians and schools struggle to address. The storyline very clearly communicates to the audience that Amber and Finn were not emotionally or physically ready to engage in any sexual activity. And make no mistake, there will be no fairytale ending for Amber; she is faced with the most difficult situation she could ever imagine."

In November 2012, Hollyoaks aired "Enjoy the Ride", in which four regular characters were killed: Rhys Ashworth (Andrew Moss), and three sixth form students, Maddie Morrison (Scarlett Bowman), Neil Cooper (Tosin Cole) and Jono (Dylan Llewellyn). In October 2013, as part of the celebration of the soap opera turning 18, the show aired Hollyoaks — The Blast from 15 October until the end of the week. The storyline saw a cast massacre with five main characters being killed off through the week, and two were also killed off in the annual Hollyoaks Later. In November 2014, the show aired Hollyoaks – End of The Line from 17 to 21 November. The storyline saw newcomers Porshe McQueen (Twinnie Lee Moore) and Lockie Campbell (Nick Rhys) celebrate their wedding reception on a party train, and Sienna Blake (Anna Passey)'s car becomes stuck on the tracks after a car chase with her father Patrick Blake (Jeremy Sheffield), causing the train to smash into it and derail. Long-running character Carmel McQueen (Gemma Merna) was killed when the wreckage exploded after saving her cousin Theresa McQueen (Jorgie Porter) from "villainous" Sonny Valentine (Aaron Fontaine), who also died in the explosion, who wanted revenge on her for killing Calvin in 2010. Long-running character Mercedes McQueen (Jennifer Metcalfe) also "died" in November 2014, just a week after her sister Carmel, in a plot that saw her brutally murdered in the McQueen house by Grace Black. As of December 2014, only two original McQueen family members remain on screen, Myra McQueen (Nicole Barber-Lane) and John Paul McQueen (James Sutton). Mercedes returned in February 2015. In June of that year, Phoebe died after Lindsey Butterfield (Sophie Austin) injected her with potassium chloride. Cleo moves into the house in late January 2015.

As part of the 20th anniversary in October 2015, a number of long-running storylines reached a climax point. In particular, it features the exposure of the affair between Ste Hay and Harry Thompson (Parry Glasspool) to his father Tony and the other characters during a Hollyoaks Pride event. The underage sixth form student had begun questioning his sexuality following a kiss with John Paul McQueen, later developing strong feelings for Ste. The plot involving Diane O'Connor, Tony and Tegan Lomax regarding their children who had been switched at birth is also concluded. The week also features the departure of the Osborne family from the Dog in the Pond pub and they had moved to the Boarding House which was previously owned by (Dennis Savage). Another storyline featured was the reveal of the Gloved Hand Killer (the identity of whom had been a mystery to viewers since January). The killer has murdered five characters up to that point (Rick Spencer, Mariam Andrews, Will Savage, Phoebe McQueen and Dylan Jenkins), has had two failed attempts (Esther Bloom and Diane O'Connor) and killed another two during the week (Ashley Davidson, Dr. S'avage) before Lindsey Butterfield is revealed as the serial killer when she seemingly murders another regular character (Freddie Roscoe). However, he is later revealed to be alive. A month later, Hollyoaks aired (for the first time) a stillbirth storyline in which Mercedes loses her baby with Joe Roscoe (Ayden Callaghan). 2015 was also the year they introduced the character of Sally St. Claire, the new head-teacher who would later be revealed as John-Paul McQueen's (James Sutton) parent, as she is a trans woman. The character is notable as the first regular trans character in the UK soap opera to be portrayed by a trans woman.

In 2017, the show featured a self-harming storyline with the character Lily Drinkwell (Lauren McQueen) and her friends Peri Lomax (Ruby O'Donnell) and Yasmine Maalik (Haiesha Mistry), which won Best Storyline and Best Single Episode at The British Soap Awards. In 2019, Hollyoaks became the first British television programme to tackle the issue of far-right extremism and radicalisation with Ste Hay (Kieron Richardson) central to the storyline. At the same time, Hollyoaks created the first storyline of Munchausen syndrome with Maxine Minniver (Nikki Sanderson) central to the storyline. On 21 December 2019, Hollyoaks aired a one-year flash forward episode to 31 December 2020, which showed sneak peaks of the upcoming county lines drug trafficking storyline fallout. The storyline was a heavy focus on the soap for over a year. The highlights of the storyline saw Juliet Nightingale (Niamh Blackshaw) and Sid Sumner (Billy Price) become groomed into selling drugs by Jordan Price (Connor Calland) and Victor Brothers (Benjamin O'Mahony), Juliet coming out as a lesbian and developing a relationship with Sid's adoptive sister Peri, Ollie Morgan (Gabriel Clark) becoming addicted to ketamine, Ella Richardson (Erin Palmer) killing Jordan, and Sid faking his death to have Victor jailed.

In April 2021, an episode of Hollyoaks that was focused on the unconscious biases that Black women suffer from was transmitted. The episode focuses on a day in the life of both Grace Black (Tamara Wall) and Martine Deveraux (Kéllé Bryan), detailing the microaggressions that Martine faces as a Black woman in the United Kingdom. The episode was followed by an hour-long special in September 2021. The episode aired on Channel 4's Black to Front day and exclusively starred Black characters. The episode was also produced, written and directed by Black creatives.

== Reception ==
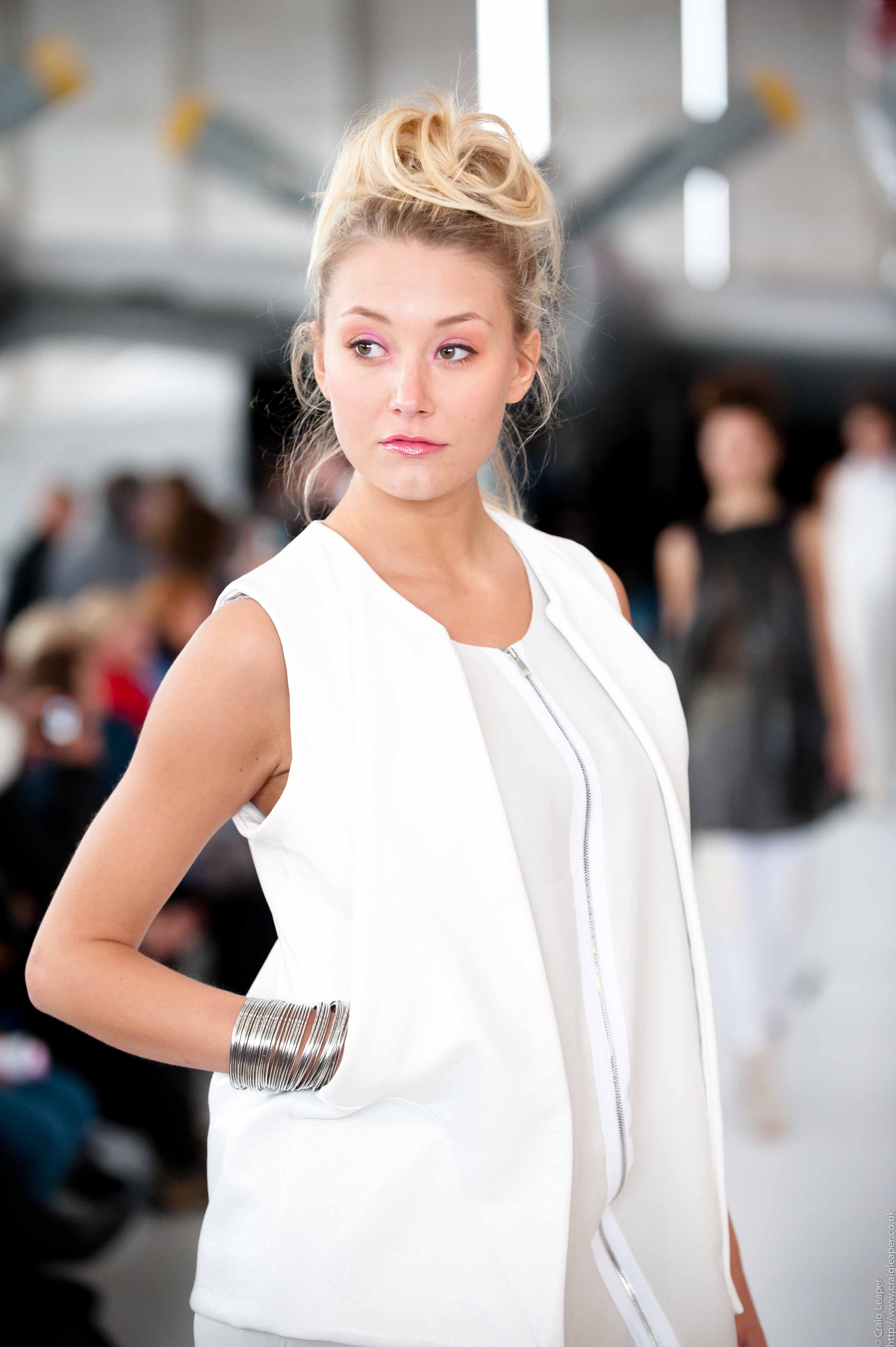
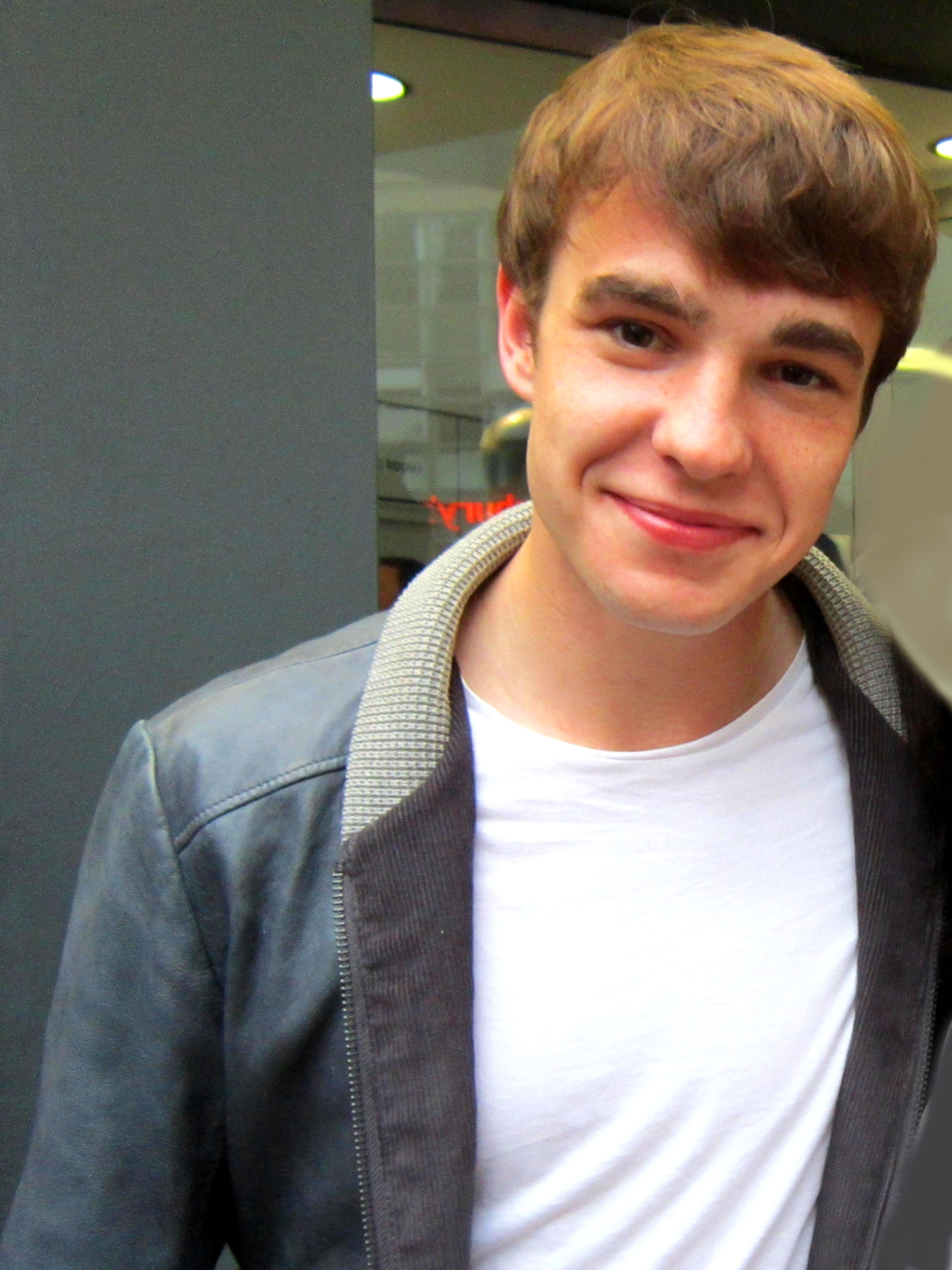
Issue-led storylines involving Melissa Walton (left) and Nico Mirallegro (right) faced criticism.

In 2001, students at University of Chester objected to a storyline which they say misrepresented students in the city. Students Union president Gordon Reay said, "Students at other universities think we are a bunch of radicals and militants because that's how the students are portrayed in Hollyoaks. They assume that the college in the programme is Chester College, because Hollyoaks is set in the city." In 2007, the soap was further criticised along with other soap operas for the amount of alcohol consumption featured on-screen. The Food Commission monitored that 18 per cent of scenes feature consumption and warned that it was conditioning teenagers into thinking it is normal to consume so much alcohol. A similar incident occurred in 1997 when the Independent Television Commission criticised the series for using an existing brand of alcohol, Caffrey's Irish Ale in the soap claiming that it breached broadcasting rules and promoted the product.

In October 2009, Channel 4 was criticised for broadcasting character Barry Newton's (Nico Mirallegro) attempted suicide, which showed similarities to an incident which happened the same week in Glasgow, in which two teenagers committed suicide by jumping into the River Clyde. In its defence, a Channel 4 spokesperson stated that any similarities in the storyline were "entirely coincidents". Hollyoaks producers felt that it was best to continue with the transmission of the episodes. They explained that due to being a continuing series, the viewers would be familiar with Barry and that it would be helpful to address a "sensitive issue" followed by a programme support announcement directing viewers to a 24-hour helpline.

In late November 2009, it was announced that character Loretta Jones (Melissa Walton) would be revealed to have killed a child when she was twelve years old. A Hollyoaks spokesperson said, "The drama is about how Loretta reacts to Chrissy's arrival back in her life and how she copes with all the memories coming back." The storyline was criticised due to its similarities to real events, such as the murder of James Bulger. The mother of Bulger, Denise Fergus, stated her outrage of the storyline while speaking to Click Liverpool. She expressed her disgust as she had not been consulted, and felt that the producers were making a "horrific murder" into a topic for entertainment to gain viewers. She demanded a meeting with producers since she felt that the storyline was a "horrible insult to the memory of [her] beautiful son." A spokesperson for Channel 4 stated that the storyline was not based on a real-life event and that producers did not intend to "seek to recreate real events". Despite the storyline not being based on Fergus's situation, producers pulled the storyline from transmission since they felt that they had a duty to "deal with sensitive issues in an appropriate way".

Hollyoaks has been praised by viewers, critics and award ceremonies for the way they handle issue-led storylines. In 2018, Duncan Lindsay of the Metro wrote a piece on Hollyoaks being "top of its game for tackling important issues". He felt that the soap had "well and truly shed any reputation for being a bonkers, teen soap" and that it had become known for "careful, considered and dignified tackling of sensitive and important social issues". Lindsay wrote that Hollyoaks does not get enough recognition for its output, especially for filming using a single-camera setup to produce five episodes a week. He felt that despite their early evening timeslot, Hollyoaks "bravely goes where many later night programmes dare not". Series producer Iain MacLeod stated that Hollyoaks often receive positive feedback from charities. He explained that their issue-led storylines result in "huge numbers of people coming forward" to the charities. Following their #DontFilterFeelings campaign focusing on mental health, cast and crew members were invited to the Houses of Parliament to discuss challenging stigma on the subject with members of parliament.

Hollyoaks performs well on its streaming service Channel 4. it was revealed in February 2022 that the soap was Channel 4's most-streamed scripted series of 2021, and the second most-streamed series in general.

== Spin-offs ==
Hollyoaks occasionally broadcasts late-night spin-off editions of the main show, usually due to them containing adult themes and controversial plots. Two video specials have also been released. In 2001, a new 16 part spin-off series was produced entitled Hollyoaks: Movin' On, this was followed by two subsequent series, Hollyoaks: Let Loose and Hollyoaks: In the City, the latter appearing as its own show rather to a spin-off. In 2008, a late-night spin-off was produced by Lucy Allan named Hollyoaks Later. This first series, although being broadcast late at night, was more of a spin-off than a special. A second series was commissioned the following year and aired in September. A third series was announced in April 2010 before airing later that year. A fourth series of Hollyoaks Later aired in September 2011 and saw the return of Hollie-Jay Bowes as Michaela McQueen. A fifth series aired in September 2012, and a sixth in October 2013. Hollyoaks Later returned for a one-off special in 2020, which featured the demise of serial killer Breda McQueen (Moya Brady), as well as the introduction of Verity Hutchinson (Eva O'Hara). In October 2009, The Hollyoaks Music Show began with celebrity artists performing on the set of Hollyoaks. Some of the acts that performed in the series include Ed Sheeran, Paloma Faith, Jason Derulo, The Saturdays, Olly Murs and more. The series was sponsored by Matalan and ended in December 2011.

In 2021, Hollyoaks: IRL a series of real-life documentaries, which was produced by Lime Digital and commissioned by Channel 4. The series had five episodes, each one based on a high-profile Hollyoaks storyline that had an impact on Hollyoaks fan lives. Hollyoaks: IRL series has been nominated for a BAFTA TV Award Short-form programme award 2022. John Junior, who shared his suicide story on BBC Radio 5, inspired the series, which features him and his story.

== Merchandise ==
=== Books ===
- Hollyoaks: Coming Together (1996)
- Hollyoaks: New Friends (1996)
- Hollyoaks: Friends and Families (1996)
- Hollyoaks: Can't Get the Girl (1996)
- Hollyoaks: Luke's Secret Diary (2000)
- Hollyoaks: Lives and Loves of Finn (2000)
- Hollyoaks: Luke's Journal: A New Beginning (2001)
- Hollyoaks: Stolen Emails (2001)
- Hollyoaks: Party! Party! Party! (2002)
- Hollyoaks: Seeing Red (2002)
- Hollyoaks: Running Wild (2002)
- Hollyoaks: The Official Companion (2002)
- Hollyoaks: Playing with Fire (2006)
- Hollyoaks: Truth or Dare (2006)
- Hollyoaks: Fame Game (2006)
- Hollyoaks: Guilt Trip (2006)
- Hollyoaks: Girl Talk (2010)

=== Calendars ===
From 2001 to 2012, the cast of Hollyoaks produced two annual calendars. One is entitled "Hollyoaks Babes", which features the female cast, and the other is "Hollyoaks Hunks", which features the male cast. For the calendar shoot, actors and actresses usually set off to exotic holiday destinations; however, in September 2009, it was revealed that the 2008 financial crisis caused the production team to have to make cuts and therefore could no longer go abroad for the shoot.
