= Holby City series 23 =

Holby City
- Series 23
- No. of episodes: 50

Release
- Original network: BBC One; BBC One HD
- Original release: 6 April 2021 – 29 March 2022

Series chronology
- ← Previous; Series 22

The twenty-third and final series of the British medical drama television series Holby City began airing on BBC One in the United Kingdom on 6 April 2021. The series consists of 50 episodes, which focus on the professional and personal lives of medical and ancillary staff at the fictional Holby City Hospital. Seán Gleeson serves as the series producer. A new theme tune was introduced in the series, but was negatively received from viewers. As the series was filmed during the COVID-19 pandemic, it had to comply with safety protocols, including social distancing and reduced people on-set. Early in the series, actors Dawn Steele and Trieve Blackwood-Cambridge isolated and became a work bubble for two episodes to film close proximity scenes. The series was promoted through multiple trailers and behind-the-scenes videos.

The show's cancellation was announced in June 2021 as part of plans from the BBC to make more nationwide programming. Holby City concludes with this series and the finale first airs on 29 March 2022. There was a wide backlash to the news from critics, fans and past and present cast members. A petition was launched to save the show, reaching over 43,700 signatures. Filming for the show concluded in December 2021 and pays homage to the National Health Service (NHS) and the show's cast and crew.

Fifteen actors continued their roles from the previous series with three regular characters departing during this series. Multiple former cast members reprised their roles, including some for the show's final episodes. Rosie Marcel (Jac Naylor) and Belinda Owusu (Nicky McKendrick) returned following breaks, while 14 actors returned for guest stints of varying lengths. Four new regular characters were introduced in series 23. Additionally, several recurring characters and multiple guest stars feature in the series.

== Episodes ==
No. overall	No. in series	Title	Directed by	Written by	Original release date	Viewers (millions)
1053	1	"Episode 1"	Dean Byfield	Patrick Homes	6 April 2021	N/A (<4.14) (Note: Not reported in the weekly top 15 programmes for four-screen viewer ratings.)
1054	2	"Episode 2"	Dean Byfield	Lucia Haynes	13 April 2021	N/A (<4.27)
1055	3	"Episode 3"	David Innes Edwards	Rebekah Harrison	20 April 2021	N/A (<4.13)
1056	4	"Episode 4"	David Innes Edwards	Joe Ainsworth	27 April 2021	N/A (<4.24)
1057	5	"Episode 5"	Daikin Marsh	Ciara Conway	4 May 2021	N/A (<4.08)
1058	6	"Episode 6"	Daikin Marsh	Tom Powell	11 May 2021	N/A (<4.40)
1059	7	"Episode 7"	Suri Krishnamma	Davey Jones	18 May 2021	N/A (<4.12)
1060	8	"Episode 8"	Suri Krishnamma	Isla Gray	25 May 2021	N/A (<4.00)
1061	9	"Episode 9"	Jamie Annett	Joe Ainsworth	1 June 2021	N/A (<3.58)
1062	10	"Episode 10"	Jamie Annett	Michelle Lipton	8 June 2021	N/A (<3.76)
1063	11	"Episode 11"	Steve Brett	Phil Mulryne	15 June 2021	N/A (<3.87)
1064	12	"Episode 12"	Steve Brett	Andy Bayliss	22 June 2021	N/A (<3.65)
1065	13	"Episode 13"	Dean Byfield	Katie Douglas	28 June 2021	N/A (<3.55)
1066	14	"Episode 14"	Dean Byfield	Jenny Davis	7 July 2021	N/A (<3.46)
1067	15	"Episode 15"	Christopher McGill	Patrick Homes	13 July 2021	N/A (<3.41)
1068	16	"Episode 16"	Christopher McGill	Becky Prestwich	20 July 2021	N/A (<3.32)
1069	17	"Episode 17"	David Innes Edwards	Joe Ainsworth	27 July 2021	N/A (<3.41)
1070	18	"Episode 18"	David Innes Edwards	Johnny McKnight	3 August 2021	N/A (<3.61)
1071	19	"Episode 19"	Katherine Churcher	Ciara Conway	10 August 2021	N/A (<3.52)
1072	20	"Episode 20"	Katherine Churcher	Katerina Watson	17 August 2021	N/A (<3.70)
1073	21	"Episode 21"	Karl Neilson	Saneh Ali and Matt Naylor	24 August 2021	N/A (<3.59)
1074	22	"Episode 22"	Karl Neilson	Davey Jones	31 August 2021	N/A (<3.67)
1075	23	"Episode 23"	Dean Byfield	Andy Bayliss	7 September 2021	N/A (<3.74)
1076	24	"Episode 24"	Dean Byfield	Isla Gray	14 September 2021	N/A (<3.92)
1077	25	"Episode 25"	Steve Brett	Katie Douglas	21 September 2021	N/A (<3.72)
1078	26	"Episode 26"	Steve Brett	Kellie Smith	28 September 2021	N/A (<3.97)
1079	27	"Episode 27"	Jean Stewart	Jess Green	5 October 2021	N/A (<3.89)
1080	28	"Episode 28"	Jean Stewart	Patrick Homes	12 October 2021	N/A (<3.61)
1081	29	"Episode 29"	Martin Smith	Rebekah Harrison	19 October 2021	N/A (<4.03)
1082	30	"Episode 30"	Martin Smith	Ed Sellek	26 October 2021	N/A (<4.14)
1083	31	"Episode 31"	Tania Diez	Rebecca Wojciechowski	2 November 2021	N/A (<4.02)
1084	32	"Episode 32"	Tania Diez	Emma Dennis-Edwards	9 November 2021	N/A (<4.12)
1085	33	"Episode 33"	David Innes Edwards	Emily Groves	16 November 2021	N/A (<4.10)
1086	34	"Episode 34"	David Innes Edwards	Ciara Conway	23 November 2021	N/A (<4.45)
1087	35	"Episode 35"	Emma Lindley	Philip Lawrence	30 November 2021	N/A (<4.35)
1088	36	"Episode 36"	Emma Lindley	Joe Ainsworth	7 December 2021	N/A (<4.13)
1089	37	"Episode 37"	Christopher McGill	Kat Rose-Martin	14 December 2021	N/A (<4.21)
1090	38	"Episode 38"	Christopher McGill	Isla Gray	4 January 2022	N/A (<4.73)
1091	39	"Episode 39"	Jamie Annett	Davey Jones	11 January 2022	N/A (<4.35)
1092	40	"Episode 40"	Jamie Annett	Andy Bayliss	18 January 2022	N/A (<4.04)
1093	41	"Episode 41"	Miranda Howard-Williams	Rebecca Harrison	25 January 2022	N/A (<4.31)
1094	42	"Episode 42"	Miranda Howard-Williams	Ed Sellek and Jayshree Patel	1 February 2022	N/A
1095	43	"Episode 43"	Michael Lacey	Michelle Lipton	8 February 2022	N/A
1096	44	"Episode 44"	Michael Lacey	Isla Gray	15 February 2022	N/A
1097	45	"Episode 45"	Karl Neilson	Ciara Conway	22 February 2022	N/A
1098	46	"Episode 46"	Karl Neilson	Sophia Leonie	28 February 2022	N/A
1099	47	"Episode 47"	Jamie Annett	Patrick Homes	8 March 2022	N/A
1100	48	"Episode 48"	Jamie Annett	Katie Douglas	15 March 2022	N/A
1101	49	"Episode 49"	David Innes Edwards	Andy Bayliss	22 March 2022	N/A
1102	50	"Episode 50"	David Innes Edwards	Joe Ainsworth	29 March 2022	3.11

== Production ==
The series commenced in the United Kingdom on 6 April 2021 on BBC One. Whilst it normally airs on Tuesday nights, the 2020 UEFA European Championship created some scheduling conflicts. As a result, episode 13 was broadcast on a Monday night, and episode 14 was broadcast on a Wednesday night. As a result of the 2021–22 FA Cup, episode 46 was broadcast on a Monday night. It was produced by BBC Studios, and is filmed at the BBC Elstree Centre. Seán Gleeson serves as the series producer for the twenty-third series, replacing Jane Wallbank; his appointment was announced on 11 March 2021. Gleeson has previous experience working for the BBC as an actor, director and producer. He expressed his excitement at joining the drama and revealed that he wanted to focus on "consolidating and reinvigorating this firm favourite for an even wider audience". Gleeson's appointment was welcomed by Kate Oates, the head of continuing drama at BBC Studios, who commented, "Seán has a unique and holistic approach to creativity and storytelling, that makes him a great company leader, and an exceptional dramatist." Oates and Deborah Sathe, the senior head of content production at BBC Studios, both oversee the production of the series. The series consists of 50 episodes. Episodes run for approximately 40 minutes, shortened by 20 minutes due to the COVID-19 pandemic. This series introduced a new theme tune for the show, which first features in episode eleven. Simon Duke from the Chronicle Live observed that viewers disliked the change and branded it "pointless".

=== Filming ===
Filming for the series takes place during the COVID-19 pandemic, so strict safety protocols, including social distancing, were enforced to protect the cast and crew. To reduce the number of additional people on-set, mannequin dummies were used on-set. Cast had to apply their own makeup with verbal support from the makeup artists. Smaller makeup injuries, such as cuts and bruises, were not used as a result of this. Larger makeup injuries, such as surgery closeups, were still able to be replicated using prosthetics. As part of their costumes, characters often use personal protective equipment (PPE). However, show bosses were keen to avoid using NHS resources so sourced their PPE from an alternative supplier. The PPE was still effective, allowing cast members to sometimes breach social distancing measures.

To allow close proximity filming, cast members sometimes isolated together and became a work "bubble". As part of a story featuring an intimate relationship between their characters, Ange Godard and Josh Hudson, respectively, actors Dawn Steele and Trieve Blackwood-Cambridge isolated for a week and became a bubble for the filming of episodes nine and ten. Steele enjoyed working in close contact with another actor again and said that she had missed it.

=== Promotion ===
The series was promoted through multiple trailers and each episode received a preview clip before broadcast. A promotional trailer for upcoming episodes of the series was released on 29 April 2021. It features footage of new and continuing storylines. A trailer promoting episode eleven was released on 9 June 2021. Lidia Molina-Whyte from the Radio Times thought the trailer looked exciting and said Holby City "shows no signs of slowing down on the drama front". On 16 July 2021, a promotional trailer was released for the second quarter of the series. The trailer begins with a recap of recent plot lines, before teasing new stories. Calli Kitson from the Metro thought there was "a lot to talk about" from the trailer.

Three different trailers were released to promote episodes 21 to 24, which features the story arc of Cameron Dunn's (Nic Jackman) revenge and the hospital explosion. Kitson opined that fans were "being treated to plenty of teaser trailers" as part of the plot. The first trailer, described as "explosive" by Digital Spy's Stephanie Chase, was released on 24 August 2021. The second, "The Clock is Ticking", was issued on 31 August 2021, and the third, "Stay With Me", a week later, on 7 September 2021. In addition to the trailers, the show's media team documented the filming of the explosion across two behind-the-scenes videos.

Two further behind-the-scenes videos were created in October and December 2021 for the return of Oliver Valentine (James Anderson) and the exit of Carole Copeland (Julia Deakin), respectively. On 29 December 2021, a trailer was released to promote the show's final episodes. Kitson opined that the trailer highlighted "drama of a different kind". The returns of Serena Campbell (Catherine Russell) and Bernie Wolfe (Jemma Redgrave) were documented in a behind-the-scenes video, released on 8 February 2022. The show's penultimate episode was promoted through a trailer which was released via Instagram on 18 March 2022. A promotional trailer for the show's final episode was released on 25 March 2022, featuring clips from the episode as well as archive footage. Sam Warner (Digital Spy) called the trailer "emotional" and prompted him to comment, "it's fair to say you should bring some tissues along".

=== Cancellation ===
On 2 June 2021, it was announced that Holby City had been cancelled and would conclude with the twenty-third series. The final episode will be broadcast in March 2022. The decision was made as part of plans from the BBC to make more programmes across the country with the intention to better reflect it. An official press release statement thanked the entire cast and crew for their work on the serial and promised that it would "[go] out on a high". Gleeson explained that his team wanted to make the rest of the series "months are the most entertaining Holby yet". Hugh Quarshie, the show's longest-serving cast member, told Sarah Marsh of The Guardian that the cast and production team were informed about the cancellation one hour before its announcement.

The show's cancellation received a backlash from critics, fans and past and present cast members. Kitson (Metro) branded the decision "a huge mistake" and summarised, "Put simply, storylines in Holby City have saved people's lives." Borehamwood and Elstree Times writer and Elstree Studios historian Paul Welsh was disappointed by the news and felt sorry for the cast "whose fame rests of being in Holby City" and may struggle with typecasting. Quarshie, Joe McFadden (Raf di Lucca), Davood Ghadami (Eli Ebrahimi) and Luisa Bradshaw-White (Lisa Fox) were among the cast who expressed their sadness with the show's cancellation. Leslie Ash, who portrayed Vanessa Lytton, shared her disappointment at the serial's cancellation, but predicted that it could lead to Holby City characters making future appearances in sister show Casualty. Jac Naylor actress Rosie Marcel compared dealing with the show's cancellation to the five stages of grief, adding that she will be sad to leave her character behind. Fans of the show launched a Change.org petition to save Holby City, with it reaching over 30,000 signatures in a matter of days, and 43,700 by December 2021.

Filming for Holby City concluded on 17 December 2021. Multiple cast members documented their final days on set and expressed how emotional they all found the experience. The show's final story features the hospital's surgical wards facing closure. Dainty (Digital Spy) pointed out that such an ending would be work well as it allows Casualty to continue without disruption. Marcel teased that the final episode would be "amazing" and "really spectacular". She added that it would pay homage to the National Health Service (NHS) and the show's cast and crew. The actress also confirmed that multiple former cast members would reprise their roles for the finale. Six actors reprised their roles in the episode. David Ames, who plays Dominic Copeland in the drama, described the final episode as "really gorgeous" which viewers would enjoy. He also promised "lots of little mini surprises along the way". It was confirmed on 2 March 2022 that the final episode would be premiere on 29 March 2022.

== Cast ==
The final series of Holby City features a cast of characters working for the National Health Service (NHS) on the surgical wards of Holby City Hospital. David Ames appears as Dominic Copeland, a registrar on the general surgery ward, Keller. Bob Barrett portrays the ward's clinical lead, Sacha Levy, a consultant general surgeon. Trieve Blackwood-Cambridge stars as Josh Hudson, a first year foundation doctor (F1) working on the Acute Assessment Unit (AAU), and Tyler Luke Cunningham features as Louis McGerry, an AAU staff nurse. Guy Henry plays Henrik Hanssen, a consultant general surgeon, while Jaye Jacobs appears as Donna Jackson, a senior staff nurse on Keller. Ramin Karimloo portrays Kian Madani, a consultant cardiothoracic surgeon on Darwin, the cardiothoracic surgery ward. Amy Lennox stars as Chloe Godard, a cardiothoracic registrar, and Jo Martin features as Max McGerry, the hospital's chief executive officer (CEO) and a consultant neurosurgeon. Amy Murphy plays Kylie Madden, an AAU staff nurse, while Vineeta Rishi portrays Lucky Simpson, a mental health nurse. Dawn Steele stars as Ange Godard, a consultant general surgeon and the clinical lead of the AAU. Alex Walkinshaw plays Adrian "Fletch" Fletcher, the director of nursing services, who is later promoted to acting CEO. Chan Woo Lim appears as AAU F1 doctor Jeong-Soo Han. Additionally, appearing in a recurring capacity are Jules Robertson and Laila Rouass who play porter Jason Haynes and Sahira Shah, a consultant cardiothoracic surgeon and the clinical lead of Darwin ward, respectively.

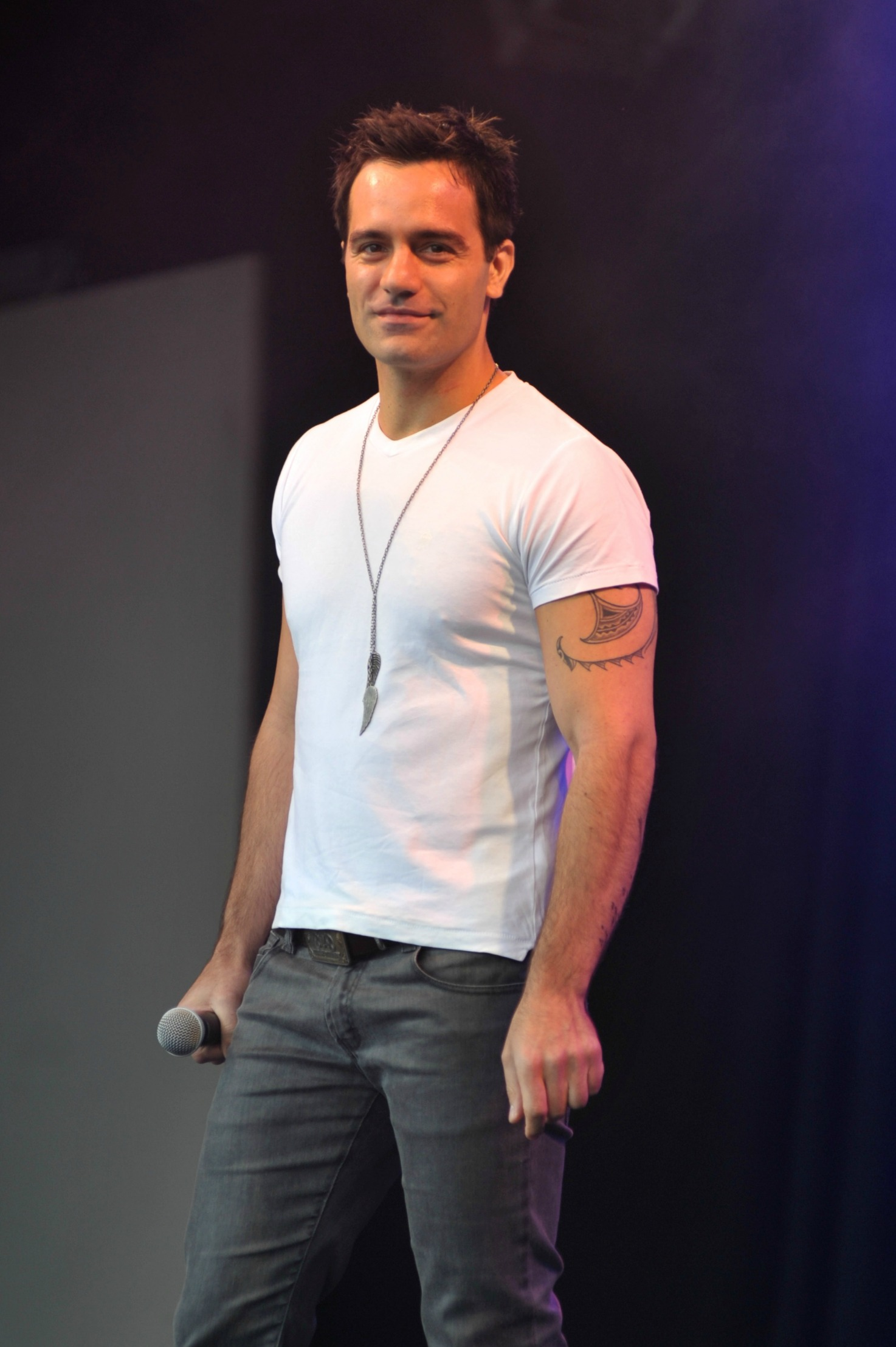
Ramin Karimloo left his role as Kian Madani during this series.

Rouass's three-month guest stint concludes in episode five. The actress confirmed her exit in an interview on Loose Women, on 30 April 2021. Sahira's exit story features her being arrested after confessing to a crime that her son committed. After two years in the role, Karimloo decided to leave Holby City during this series. The actor had only intended to stay for a single series, but decided to extend his contract due to how much he enjoyed the role. Kian is killed-off in the twelfth episode at the conclusion of his drug addiction story. On 7 September 2021, it was revealed that Lennox had left her role as Chloe and would be depart in episode 24. The character was listed as a potential death following an explosion at the hospital. Chloe was not killed off and instead left for a job in Switzerland. In a goodbye post on social media, Lennox joked that Chloe is enjoying a luxurious life in Switzerland and "lived happily ever after". Rishi departed her role as Lucky in episode 33 after a year on the serial. Her exit was confirmed following the episode's broadcast.

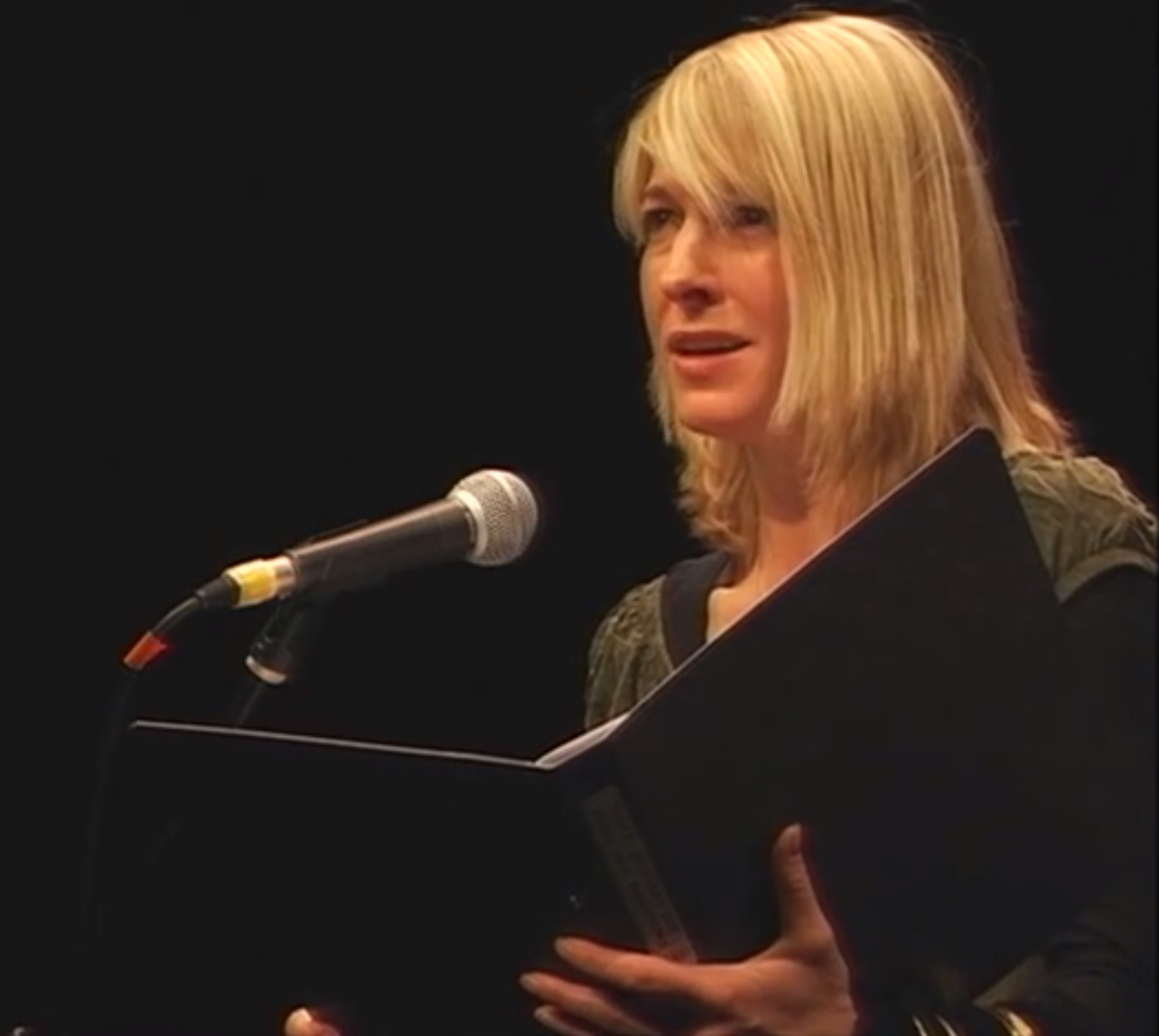
Jemma Redgrave made multiple guest appearances as Bernie Wolfe in series 23.

In July 2021, it was confirmed that episode 17 would feature the return of a former character. Their identity was concealed to maintain a surprise for the audience. In the episode, Jac Naylor (Rosie Marcel) was revealed as the returnee, following her departure in the previous series. The character returns as the new Director of Improvement for the hospital. Digital Spy's Dainty confirmed that the return was permanent. Robbie Nichols of the Eastern Daily Press reported in August 2021 that Nic Jackman had reprised his role as junior doctor Cameron Dunn. The character returns in episode 21 after being released from prison to take part in an experimental trial. As part of the story, Bernie Wolfe, portrayed by Jemma Redgrave, was reintroduced in the next episode. Redgrave left the serial in series 20 and the character was killed-off in the following series, making her return a surprise for the audience. Jackman was excited about Redgrave's return since Cameron's "darker path" began with Bernie's death. Both Jackman and Redgrave departed the series in episode 24; Cameron was killed-off as part of his exit.

To celebrate the show's history, producers invited former cast members to reprise their roles for the show's final episodes. Marcel confirmed that the finale would also feature appearances from former characters. James Anderson's decision to reprise his role as Oliver Valentine, four years following his departure, was announced on 5 October 2021. He made his return during episode 28, and departed at the conclusion of his return stint in episode 37. As part of his exit scenes, Camilla Arfwedson filmed a cameo appearance as Zosia Self. Episode 37 also featured the return of Nicky McKendrick (Belinda Owusu) following Owusu's maternity leave. Redgrave reprised her role again in episode 43, this time alongside Catherine Russell as Serena Campbell, who appeared in the drama for eight years. Their return provided an update on their relationship as they become engaged and also explored the longstanding repercussions of Cameron's actions. In February 2022, the return of Michael Spence, portrayed by Hari Dhillon, was confirmed. He appears in episode 46, eight years after his last appearance. John Michie reprised his role as Guy Self, a character he played on-off between 2013 and 2020, in episode 47 for an "extended cameo" appearance. Three characters who were previously killed-off in the show returned for a guest appearance in episode 48: Essie di Lucca (Kaye Wragg), Arthur Digby (Rob Ostlere) and Jasmine Burrows (Lucinda Dryzek). They appear as part of a "ghostly dream sequence" as a terminally ill Jac considers her own mortality. The episode also features the return of actor Paul Bradley as cardiothoracic consultant Elliot Hope, who appears in the show's final three episodes. His return was kept under embargo until transmission. On 16 March 2022, it was announced that the show's final episode would feature the return of five former cast members: Russell (Serena Campbell), Redgrave (Bernie Wolfe), Chizzy Akudolu (Mo Effanga), longest-serving cast member Hugh Quarshie (Ric Griffin), and Luke Roberts (Joseph Byrne).

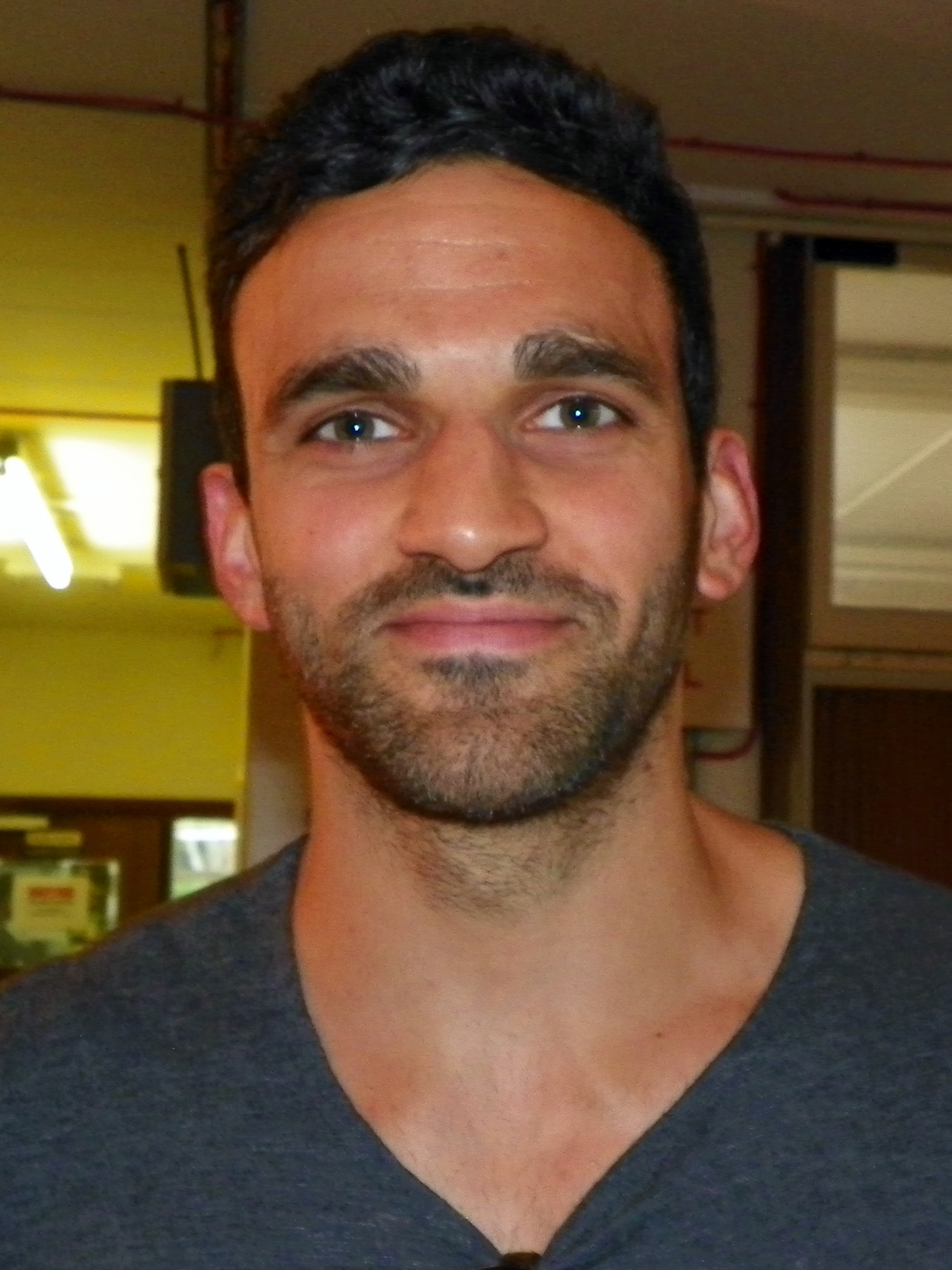
Davood Ghadami was cast in the series as Eli Ebrahimi.

Actor Davood Ghadami's casting as Eli Ebrahimi was announced on 16 April 2021. Eli is billed as a "talented, if slightly idiosyncratic" consultant cardiothoracic surgeon who is hired as the new clinical lead of Darwin ward. Ghadami expressed his joy at joining Holby City, which he praised for its "quality storytelling". Gleeson stated that he was excited about Ghadami's casting and predicted he would be "a fantastic addition to [the] cast". Eli makes his first appearance in episode 17. The show's official Twitter account confirmed on 23 April 2021 that actress Debra Stephenson had joined the cast as Jeni Sinclair, the hospital's new director of funding. The tweet includes a clip of Jeni's introduction, which features in episode four. Stephenson described her character as a "bubbly, vivacious, generous, warm person" on appearance, but with a "whole other dark side to her". Writers used the character of Jeni to explore the topic of sexual exploitation. On 16 July 2021, it was confirmed that Clare Burt had been cast as Madge Britton, a "straight talking, no-nonsense" nurse practitioner working on the AAU. She first appears in episode 17. Simon Slater made his first appearance as consultant general surgeon Russell "Russ" Faber in episode 28. He is introduced as an old friend of Hanssen and supports Oliver's return.

The series features several recurring characters and multiple guest stars. Raad Rawi guest stars as Reyhan Shah, the father of Sahira. Having joined the show in the previous series, Reyhan features in a historical abuse story with Hanssen. Henry described Reyhan as "a devious, manipulative, nasty piece of work". The character makes his final appearance in episode five after being killed-off. Sahira's son, Abs Raza (Ali Hadji-Heshmati), also appears in the opening episode, having appeared twice in the previous series. He makes subsequent appearances in episodes four, where it is revealed that he is being abused by Reyhan too, five, and fifteen. As part of a new story exploring Louis' backstory, Vicky Turner (Juno Dawson) was introduced at the end of series 22, continuing the role into this series. Actress Doña Croll was cast as Sanya Morrison, the mother of Max and grandmother of Louis, and first appears in the opening episode. Her agency confirmed that she would appear in multiple episodes, and she departs in the third episode when the character is killed off. Sonny Poon Tip also joined the recurring cast in episode one, portraying "troubled" cardiothoracic patient Andrei Tarpov. Writers incorporated the character into Kian's drug addiction story. He appears across multiple episodes, departing in episode twelve. Philippa Stanton guest stars in episode two as Flo Gallagher, a patient who helps Dom with his stoma bag diagnosis. She appears again in episode 40.

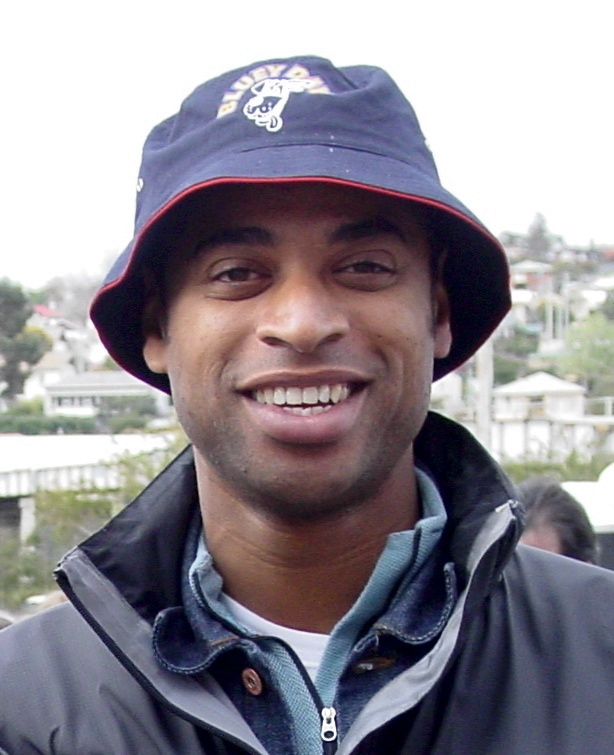
Karl Collins guest starred in two episodes as Treve Harding.

The appearances of Phoebe French and Karl Collins, in the roles of Evie Fletcher and Treve Harding, were publicised on 29 April 2021. Evie is the daughter of Fletch and has appeared in the drama on-off since series 17. She returns in episode seven; in the narrative, she is hired as a barista at Pulses, the hospital café. She soon develops a relationship with Andrei which Walkinshaw explained would create problems. Collins' character is introduced as part of Max's story exploring the BRCA1 gene. Treve is a locum consultant oncologist whose backstory states that he trained with Max. He appears in episodes eight and nine. Actor Mark Jordon joined the guest cast in episode ten as Connor Coleman, a social worker. Jordon confirmed that he would only appear in a "few episodes", but dubbed it "one of [his] favourite gigs". Julia Deakin reprised her role as Carole Copeland, the mother of Dom, in the fifteenth episode; she has appeared in multiple episode arcs since series 17. The story team used the character to explore the issue of vascular dementia over multiple episodes. As part of the sexual exploitation story involving Jeni, Richard Pepper was introduced as Rich Peterson. He first appears in episode 14. Pepper's agency confirmed it was a recurring role. The story also leads to the reintroduction of Donna's adoptive daughter, Mia Barron (Briana Shann), in episode 18.

Karen Ascoe guest stars as Regina Marriot, an inspector who appears as part of the show's final story. She features in episode 14, before reappearing from episodes 38. Delroy Atkinson was cast in the guest role of Delroy Jones, a terminally ill patient on the AAU who makes a connection with Kylie. He appears from episode 15, until episode 18, when he is killed-off. Episode 24 includes appearances from Casualty characters Ethan Hardy (George Rainsford) and Iain Dean (Michael Stevenson). In July, Ghadami revealed that Lucy Briggs-Owens had been cast as his character's wife, Amelia Ebrahimi. She made her first appearance in episode 26. Delainey Hayles appeared as Russ' daughter Billie Faber in episode 31. She then returned from episode 41. Juliet, the daughter of Nicky and Cameron, was introduced in episode 37 following the former's reintroduction. She was portrayed by Owusu's newborn daughter; the actress explained that she was pleased with the decision as she got to spend extra time with her daughter between takes. The character was central to a story about Nicky's maternal struggles. Jenny Howe reprised her recurring guest role as reverend Lexy Morrell from episode 47. She last appeared in series 20. Hamish Clark reprised his guest role as patient Ken Davies for the show's final two episodes.

=== Main characters ===
- David Ames as Dominic Copeland
- Bob Barrett as Sacha Levy
- Trieve Blackwood-Cambridge as Josh Hudson
- Clare Burt as Madge Britton (from episode 17)
- Tyler Luke Cunningham as Louis McGerry
- Davood Ghadami as Eli Ebrahimi (from episode 17)
- Guy Henry as Henrik Hanssen
- Jaye Jacobs as Donna Jackson
- Ramin Karimloo as Kian Madani (until episode 12)
- Amy Lennox as Chloe Godard (until episode 24)
- Rosie Marcel as Jac Naylor (from episode 17)
- Jo Martin as Max McGerry
- Amy Murphy as Kylie Madden
- Belinda Owusu as Nicky McKendrick (from episode 37)
- Vineeta Rishi as Lucky Simpson (until episode 33)
- Simon Slater as Russell "Russ" Faber (from episode 28)
- Dawn Steele as Ange Godard
- Debra Stephenson as Jeni Sinclair (episodes 4–26)
- Alex Walkinshaw as Adrian "Fletch" Fletcher
- Chan Woo Lim as Jeong-Soo Han

=== Recurring characters ===
- Karen Ascoe as Regina Marriott
- Paul Bradley as Elliot Hope
- Lucy Briggs-Owen as Amelia Ebrahimi
- Julia Deakin as Carole Copeland
- Phoebe French as Evie Fletcher
- Delainey Hayles as Billie Faber
- Jenny Howe as Lexy Morrell
- Sonny Poon Tip as Andrei Tarpov
- Jules Robertson as Jason Haynes
- Laila Rouass as Sahira Shah (until episode 5)
- Richard Pepper as Rich Peterson
- Briana Shann as Mia Barron

=== Guest characters ===
- Chizzy Akudolu as Mo Effanga
- James Anderson as Oliver Valentine
- Camilla Arfwedson as Zosia Self
- Delroy Atkinson as Delroy Jones
- Hamish Clark as Ken Davies
- Karl Collins as Treve Harding
- Doña Croll as Sanya Morrison
- Juno Dawson as Vicky Turner
- Hari Dhillon as Michael Spence
- Lucinda Dryzek as Jasmine Burrows
- Ali Hadji-Heshmati as Abs Raza
- Nic Jackman as Cameron Dunn
- Mark Jordon as Connor Coleman
- John Michie as Guy Self
- Rob Ostlere as Arthur Digby
- Hugh Quarshie as Ric Griffin
- George Rainsford as Ethan Hardy
- Raad Rawi as Reyhan Shah
- Jemma Redgrave as Bernie Wolfe
- Luke Roberts as Joseph Byrne
- Catherine Russell as Serena Campbell
- Philippa Stanton as Flo Gallagher
- Michael Stevenson as Iain Dean
- Carol Walton as Elaine Hudson
- Kaye Wragg as Essie di Lucca
- James Bradwell as River Henderson

== See also ==
- Impact of the COVID-19 pandemic on television
