= Episode 1101 =

- Holby City episode
- Episode no.: Series 23; Episode 49
- Directed by: David Innes Edwards
- Written by: Andy Bayliss
- Original air date: 22 March 2022
- Running time: 44 minutes

Guest appearances
- Paul Bradley as Elliot Hope; Lucy Briggs-Owen as Amelia Ebrahimi; Zoë Aldrich as Anita Blaise; Hamish Clarke as Ken Davies; Jenny Howe as Alexandra 'Lexy' Dunblane

Episode chronology
← Previous "Episode 1100"	Next → "Episode 1102"
- Holby City series 23

Episode 1101 of the British medical drama television series Holby City is the forty-ninth episode of the twenty-third series and the 1101st episode overall. It is also Holby City's penultimate episode after the show was cancelled by the BBC in 2021. The episode was written by Andy Bayliss and directed by David Innes Edwards, and it premiered on BBC One on 22 March 2022. As with the other final episodes of the series, Episode 1101 features the storylines that writers had developed to create the series finale that followed. Filming the stories for the final episodes of Holby City was an emotional experience for the cast.

The episode's main story is Jac Naylor's (Rosie Marcel) operation to remove a brain tumour. Other stories featured included Josh Hudson's (Trieve Blackwood-Cambridge) bulimia and guest character Ken Davies' (Hamish Clarke) admission to AAU ward. Given that the show was ending, writers were able to plan where to end each character. Episode 1101 features the conclusion to Eli Ebrahimi's (Davood Ghadami) story as his wife, Amelia Ebrahimi (Lucy Briggs-Owen) announces she is pregnant. This story was described by Ghadami as one of the show's few happy concluding moments. The episode also features Holby City's final location shoot which was filmed solely with (Bob Barrett) as Sacha Levy. The episode features the music "English Rose" by the British band The Jam. Television critics have praised the episode for its emotional storyline about Jac's surgery and the conclusion of Eli and Amelia's storylines.

== Plot ==
Max McGerry (Jo Martin), Madge Britton (Clare Burt) and Henrik Hanssen (Guy Henry) discuss Jac Naylor's (Rosie Marcel) upcoming operation. Elliot Hope (Paul Bradley) informs them that her latest scan results indicate more tumour growth which will make the procedure even more difficult. They agree to work around it the issues. Sacha attempts to convince Jac to abort the operation. Sacha Levy (Bob Barrett) clashes with Adrian "Fletch" Fletcher (Alex Walkinshaw) over doubts about Jac's operation. Jac visits the Darwin operating theatre where she reminisces over old memories of her former colleagues. Jac speaks to a porter and her speech slurs. She begins gasping for breath and she calls for Elliot's help. He treats her quickly, Jac asks Elliot to not tell Max about her deteriorating condition. She says she is not scared and asks only for a fix or let her die on the operating table to avoid further suffering.

Claudia Blaise's (Lottie Tolhurst) mother Anita Blaise (Zoë Aldrich) visits Josh Hudson (Trieve Blackwood-Cambridge) and gives him her diary and blames Josh for neglecting Claudia and blames him for her death. Josh goes to confront Anita but finds Ken Davies (Hamish Clarke) outside the hospital with injured legs and Dominic Copeland (David Ames) rushes to assist him. However he does not know who or where he is. He is convinced his son Noah has been hit by a car. Ken asks for Jac's help. Ange Godard (Dawn Steele) helps treat Ken, they want to find Noah, they need to treat Ken's legs in theatre. Too much necrosis, they battle to save the foot at Josh's insistence. After a successful operation, Fletch visits AAU and identifies the man as Ken, a former patient. Fletch explains that Noah had died years earlier and Fletch helps him remember his reality. Ken reveals he became homeless after losing his job and cannot remember becoming confused. Ken goes into cardiac arrest but Dominic and Ange resuscitate him. Dominic reads Claudia's diary and accuses him of having an affair. He is forced to tell him about Claudia and his bulimia. Josh tells Ange about Claudia's diary. Ange reassures Josh that he is not to blame for Claudia's death.

Alexandra 'Lexy' Dunblane (Jenny Howe) is treated on Keller by Donna Jackson (Jaye Jacobs), Jeong-Soo Han (Chan Woo Lim) and Henrik. They inform her they have kidney match. Elliot checks Lexy an her swollen ankles. He orders more scans and tests to ensure she is okay. Donna notices Lexy's abdomen is distended and Henrik orders further heart scans. Lexy goes into heart failure, ruining her chances of a kidney transplant. Jeong also discovers he is nominated for the junior doctor award.

Amelia Ebrahimi (Lucy Briggs-Owen) visits the hospital to reveal that she is pregnant and Jac congratulates her and husband Eli Ebrahimi (Davood Ghadami) before she goes into surgery. Sacha goes to Jac's flat to retrieve a locket and finds it left in a state which suggests Jac believes she will die. Max and Elliot begin Jac's surgery. They begin to face difficulties in the procedure. Later in the operation Max discovers that the brain tumour is larger than they had anticipated. Max states they cannot remove all of the tumour. Carrying on will cause a stroke and they abort the operation. Sacha, Fletch and Elliot gather around Jac's bedside. She regains consciousness and believes the operation was successful. Elliot informs her that it did not work, Jac is devastated and apologises to Elliot for asking him to let her die.

== Development ==
=== Background ===
On 2 June 2021, it was announced that the BBC had decided to cancel Holby City at the end of its twenty-third series. It was confirmed that the final episode would be broadcast in March 2022. A statement issued via the show's social media accounts detailed that the BBC had decided to end the show to create more diverse productions across the United Kingdom. The statement explained it was "to better reflect, represent and serve all parts of the country." The BBC added their intention to "reshape" their "drama slate" without Holby City on their broadcasting schedule. Director of BBC Drama Piers Wenger explained that it was "an incredibly difficult decision that took time to come to." Despite this, the BBC made a commitment to work with the Holby City production team to ensure that the show ended "on a high". The production team also promised that the show would receive the "send-off it deserves".

Viewers of the show launched a Change.org petition to save Holby City, which gained more than 30,000 signatures in the immediate weeks following the cancellation, and by December 2021 it reached 43,700. The BBC decided to end the show regardless of the petition. It was confirmed on 2 March 2022 that the final episode would be premiere on 29 March 2022. Episode 1101 marks Holby City's penultimate episode after it was broadcast for twenty-three years.

=== Production ===
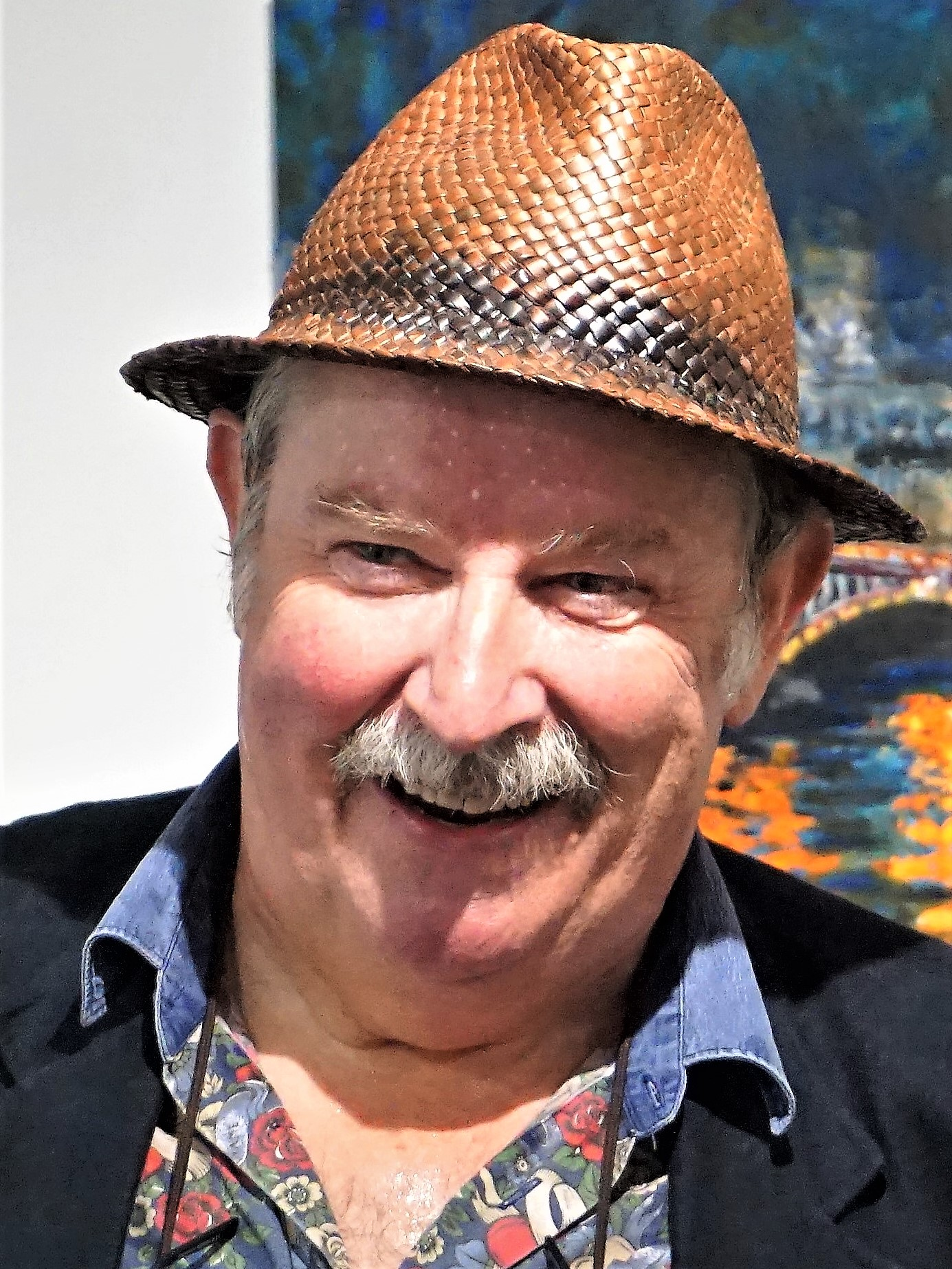
Paul Bradley plays returning character Elliot Hope

Most of the stories featured in the episode were written to create a "satisfying conclusion" with the show's finale in mind. Story producer Bed Wadey told Calli Kitson from Metro that the following episode would "tie off a lot of stories that have been building for a long while." Writers chose to feature Jac Naylor's (Rosie Marcel) brain tumour surgery as the episode 1101's main story. It features returning character Elliot Hope (Paul Bradley) determined to find a solution and cure Jac's cancer. They also included other stories centric to Josh Hudson (Trieve Blackwood-Cambridge) and guest character Ken Davies (Hamish Clarke). Filming the show's final episodes was an emotional experience for all involved. Barrett told a reporter from What's on TV that "the ending will be emotional. Everyone – the writers, cast and crew – feel it's incredible." Filming the final episodes was difficult for all cast members involved. Barrett told Reilly that it was "like the seven stages of grief. Initially there was shock, then sadness, as we went on there was lots of gallows humour, then we cried, got upset, but also had a laugh. We really savoured our last times together before it finished." Marcel told Laura-Jayne Tyler from Inside Soap that "the final episodes I think are some of the best we've ever done." Marcel added that the cast and crew were spurred on by the BBC's decision to end the show and "we've delivered something outstanding".

In one scene, Sacha Levy (Bob Barrett) chases Jac into the hospital lift begging her to reconsider her operation. Wadey told Kitson that the scene made "compelling drama" because "that clarity of view" Jac has and her determination to fight for her life. Wadey added that it was written to reflect the show's own fate of ending permanently. Guest cast members for the episode included Jenny Howe as Alexandra 'Lexy' Dunblane Lucy and Briggs-Owen as Amelia Ebrahimi. The latter discovers she is pregnant she informs Jac in the episode. Wadey stated that the show ending allowed writers to plan exactly where each character's story would end. Davood Ghadami who plays Amelia's husband Eli Ebrahimi revealed that Eli's story had already concluded in Episode 1101 and he would not play a prominent part in the finale. He told Metro's Kitson that "Eli's story is one of the very few happy endings to an extent in amongst what is going to be quite a dark ending for a few of the other characters."

The episode features the music "English Rose" by the British band The Jam. The song was featured during a scene in which Sacha visits Jac's flat. He finds a record player switched on with "English Rose" loaded and plays the song. He then realises Jac has created her last will and testament. A member of the show's production team told Elaine Reilly from Whattowatch.com that "there is no strong specificity to the track, it was selected as a song that might likely be a record her dad had and played to Jac when younger." The scene was also the final ever to be filmed on location away from the Holby City set at the BBC Elstree Centre. The scene only featured Sacha meaning he was the only cast member on the last location shoot. Of this Barrett stated "it was just me, so I felt very privileged that that was the case."

== Promotion and broadcast ==
External videos
- "Episode 1101 trailer" A trailer for the episode
- "All or nothing" A preview clip for the episode

On 15 March 2022, the BBC released a forty-second spoiler clip from the episode. It featured Max discussing Jac's operation and Elliot looking worried. It concluded with Sacha trying to get Jac to reconsider having the operation. Advance written spoilers and photographs were also released ahead of the broadcast but the outcomes of Jac's operation was kept under embargo. On 18 March 2022, the show released a trailer for the episode via their official Twitter account. Over the following days the show's production team released a series of spoiler clips to promote the episode further. They featured the characters Jac, Sacha, Josh and Dominic.

The episode premiered on BBC One on 22 March 2022 at 7:55 pm and was available to watch or download on BBC iPlayer for eleven months after its broadcast. It was also repeated on BBC Two on 28 March 2022.

== Reception ==
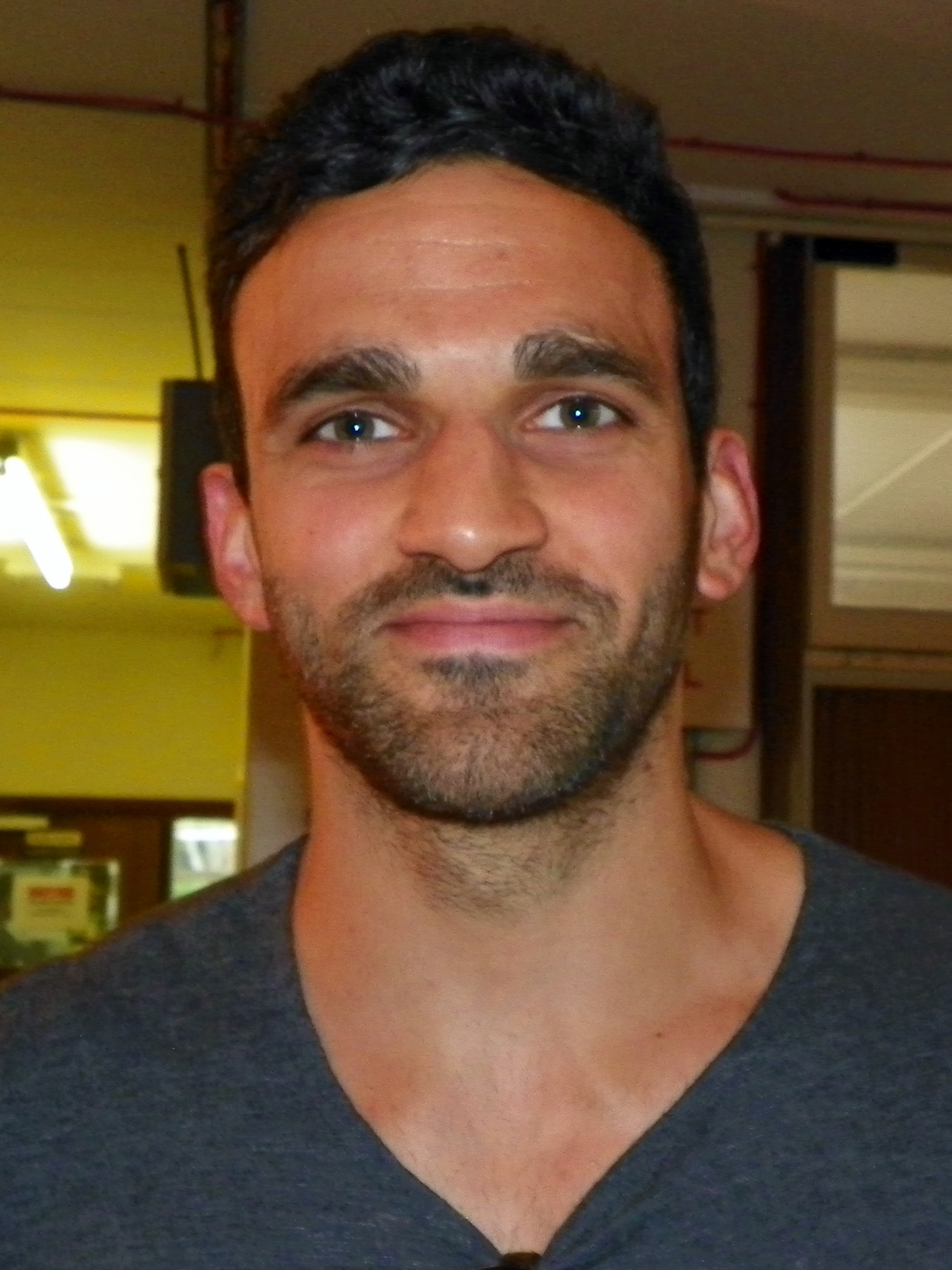
Writers received praise for their work on the character, Eli Ebrahimi played by Davood Ghadami

Elaine Reilly from TVTimes gave the episode a four star rating. She included it in the magazines "pick of the day" feature. She commented that Jac facing death in the episode "really hammers home the loss of this beloved series." Reilly added that Holby City has traditionally been a "central hub for miracles" and hoped Jac would be cured the following episode. Writing for Whattowatch.com, Reilly stated "the popular medical drama isn’t going out quietly" because it had "big emotional punches". She added that viewers watched with "bated breath" because of the "intense outing". Writers from What's on TV included the episode in their "Hot TV" feature, which profiles the best shows to watch of that broadcast week. They described Lexy's diagnosis as "shock news" and branded it "do-or-die time" for Jac.

Sophie Dainty from Digital Spy commented about Jac's operation stating, "trust us, you'll need the tissues for this one either way." Sue Haasler from Metro described the episode as "incredibly emotional". She opined that writers featuring Ken in the episode "was a reminder of the days when Jac Naylor was able to fix anything." Dainty also believed that the episode gave viewers a spoiler for the finale. She stated that Jac's failed operation made it "obvious" that there was "unlikely to be a happy ending" for Jac "no matter how much we wanted there to be." Laura Denby from Radio Times stated that the episode contained "heartbreaking" scenes and branded it a "devastating penultimate episode". She praised writers for the conclusion of Eli and Amelia's story. She added "their storyline has been one of the show’s strongest final arcs, a testament to both actors who only had a matter of months to develop their characters." Metro's Calli Kitson branded Episode 1101 "very tense" and that "everything rests on Jac's operation." Their colleague Sue Haasler branded it a "hugely emotional episode" and Jac's requesting Elliot let her die an "heartbreaking promise".
