= Holby City episode 1102 =

Episode 1102
- Holby City episode
- Episode no.: Series 23; Episode 50
- Directed by: David Innes Edwards
- Written by: Joe Ainsworth
- Original air date: 29 March 2022
- Running time: 46 minutes

Guest appearances
- Paul Bradley as Elliot Hope; Jules Robertson as Jason Haynes; Chizzy Akudolu as Mo Effanga; Hugh Quarshie as Ric Griffin; Catherine Russell as Serena Campbell; Jemma Redgrave as Bernie Wolfe; Jenny Howe as Alexandra 'Lexy' Dunblane; Hamish Clarke as Ken Davies; Tracy Wiles as Helen Davies; Luke Roberts as Joseph Byrne (uncredited)

Episode chronology
← Previous "Episode 1101"	Next → —
- Holby City series 23

Episode 1102 of the British medical drama television series Holby City is the fiftieth episode of the twenty-third series and the 1102nd episode overall. It is also the final episode after the show was cancelled by the BBC. The episode was written by Joe Ainsworth and directed by David Innes Edwards, and premiered on BBC One on 29 March 2022. The show's production team promised fans they would create an ending "it deserves" and began rewriting stories. The writers were used to scripting the show as a continuing drama but the show's end meant they could create closure for all featured characters. Producers were loath to introduce dramatic stunts or explosions in the finale. They favoured an emotional approach with stories that paid homage to the NHS, which they believed were Holby City's "roots".

The episode features the death of long-featured character Jac Naylor (Rosie Marcel). Earlier episodes had focused on her determination to find a cure for her brain tumour. Jac awakes from surgery and soon dies from a stroke after implementing an advance healthcare directive. Jac's organs are retrieved for transplant procedures and some good comes from her death. Story producer Ben Wadey chose to kill the character off to provide a definitive end for the show. He wanted to ensure viewers were not left feeling the show was left with "unfinished business". Marcel was initially reluctant to portray the story because she wanted Jac to live on. In addition the episode focuses on the remaining regular characters as their stories conclude. Writers were challenged with the task of giving each character a suitable ending either before or during Episode 1102. The episode also features the return of five former characters who make cameo appearances. The show's end credits featured a slow version of the iconic theme tune and a montage of former cast members.

The episode received positive reviews for its emotional scenes and writing. Various critics praised the episode for paying tribute to the NHS. Judith Woods from The Daily Telegraph branded it a "beautifully-judged finale". Hannah Verdier from The Guardian praised the "dignified" decision to end the show "gracefully" instead of relying on sensational stunts. Jessica Sansome of Manchester Evening News believed that the episode was effective in promoting organ donation.

== Plot ==
Jason Haynes (Jules Robertson) visits Jac Naylor (Rosie Marcel) and Alexandra 'Lexy' Dunblane (Jenny Howe) on the Darwin ward. Jac has awoken from failed surgery and tells Lexy that she does not want last rites. Nicky McKendrick (Belinda Owusu) and Eli Ebrahimi (Davood Ghadami) carry out successful heart surgery on a patient. Henrik Hanssen (Guy Henry), Donna Jackson (Jaye Jacobs) and Jeong-Soo Han (Chan Woo Lim) work on Keller ward where they care for Lexy, who is in need of a kidney and heart transplant.

Dominic Copeland (David Ames), Ange Godard (Dawn Steele), Josh Hudson (Trieve Blackwood-Cambridge), Madge Britton (Clare Burt), Kylie Maddon (Amy Murphy) and Louis McGerry (Tyler Luke Cunningham) work the shift on AAU ward as they seek a diagnosis for patient Ken Davies (Hamish Clarke). Dominic and Ange argue over Josh's bulimia secret but are forced to work together in an operating theatre to save Ken's life. Ange soon makes peace with Dominic and discusses her future with Josh.

With Adrian "Fletch" Fletcher (Alex Walkinshaw) as her witness, Jac makes an advance directive to request no medical intervention in the event of further complications. Elliot Hope (Paul Bradley) wants to attempt another operation on a reluctant Jac. Max McGerry (Jo Martin) informs Sacha Levy (Bob Barrett) that Jac is nearing the end of her life. When Sacha visits Jac, she suffers a stroke and they prepare to intervene. Fletch interrupts them and makes her advance directive known and they are forced to let her die. They keep a brain-dead Jac's body on a ventilator and prepare her for an organ retrieval procedure. Jac is surrounded by her close friends and colleagues as they reminisce, before taking her body into surgery. Mo Effanga (Chizzy Akudolu) arrives at the hospital to carry out Lexy's surgery but is shocked to learn of Jac's death. Lexy receives Jac's heart and after a successful procedure she is transferred to a recovery ward.

Jac provides a voice over as the final scenes roll. Joseph Byrne (Luke Roberts), Ric Griffin (Hugh Quarshie) Serena Campbell (Catherine Russell) and Bernie Wolfe (Jemma Redgrave) all receive Jac's organs at various locations to perform transplant procedures. Henrik travels to Leeds reunited with his love interest Russell "Russ" Faber (Simon Slater). All medical staff on the three main wards are notified about a major incident and they rush outside to attend the emergency; despite not being given time to adjust to their grief.

== Production ==
=== Background ===
On 2 June 2021, it was announced that the BBC had decided to cancel Holby City at the end of its twenty-third series. It was confirmed that the final episode would be broadcast in March 2022. A statement issued via the show's social media accounts detailed that the BBC had decided to end the show to create more diverse productions across the United Kingdom. The statement explained it was "to better reflect, represent and serve all parts of the country." The BBC added their intention to "reshape" their "drama slate" without Holby City on their broadcasting schedule. Director of BBC Drama Piers Wenger explained that it was "an incredibly difficult decision that took time to come to." Despite this, the BBC made a commitment to work with the Holby City production team to ensure that the show ended "on a high". The production team also promised that the show would receive the "send-off it deserves".

Fans of the show launched a Change.org petition to save Holby City, with it reaching over 30,000 signatures in the immediate weeks following the cancellation, and 43,700 by December 2021. The BBC decided to end the show regardless of the petition. It was confirmed on 2 March 2022 that the final episode would premiere on 29 March 2022.

=== Development ===
The show's writing team were accustomed to scripting continuing drama but not a series with a clear ending. They changed their writing strategy when the BBC axed Holby City. This allowed them to create suitable endings to each character's story and they chose to conclude the stories of some of the characters in Episode 1102. The story team decided early on that the finale would not feature stunts and explosions. They wanted to end the show on its core values shared with the NHS. This theme united the writers who all had a "common theme" which they used to script the finale. Story producer Ben Wadey stated that theme was "to show the resilience in characters who work there all of the time, they give their lives to the profession." Once completed, the show's production were initially secretive regarding details of the episode. In November 2021, Rosie Marcel who plays Jac Naylor told Laura-Jayne Tyler from Inside Soap that the final episode would be "spectacular" and "amazing". She also revealed that multiple former cast members would return for the episode. Marcel described the ending of "Episode 1102" as "a massive nod to the NHS and to everyone making this show." David Ames (Dominic Copeland) added that "it's going to be really gorgeous. We know that the audience are going to love it as well."

The episode features the death of Jac and this was planned well in advance. Marcel's longevity made Jac one of the show's long-featured characters. Producers informed Marcel, who was upset with their decision and she fought with them. Marcel revealed that she became "exhausted" trying to reverse their decision and they eventually discussed Jac's death in more depth. She "begrudgingly" accepted her character's demise and decided to concentrate on making her death "the best it could possibly be". The episode is heavily centric to Jac's demise. Marcel felt that it was a compliment from the production team but worried other characters would be side-lined. However, during the episode writers created moments for every character "to shine". Inside Soap's Tyler revealed that the episode would focus on the immediate aftermath of Jac's failed surgery to remove a terminal brain tumour. She added that viewers would learn how bold Holby City is in regards to the mortality of their most popular character. The episode also features former character Elliot Hope (Paul Bradley), who had returned to the series in prior episodes to perform Jac's surgery.

Holby City's story producer Ben Wadey did not want to leave viewers feeling "frustration" that the show had "unfinished business". He believed that the finality of the show ending created grief and that it was the end of an era. He wanted to ensure this was personified in the story and believed Jac was the right character to end the show with. Jac was often portrayed as determined to survive her brain tumour and find a cure. Wadey explained that in reality people do not survive and the NHS do not always cure everyone. He wanted the show to end realistically and go back to its "roots for the finale". He believed that Jac's condition was fragile and to conjure up a miracle cure would have been misleading.

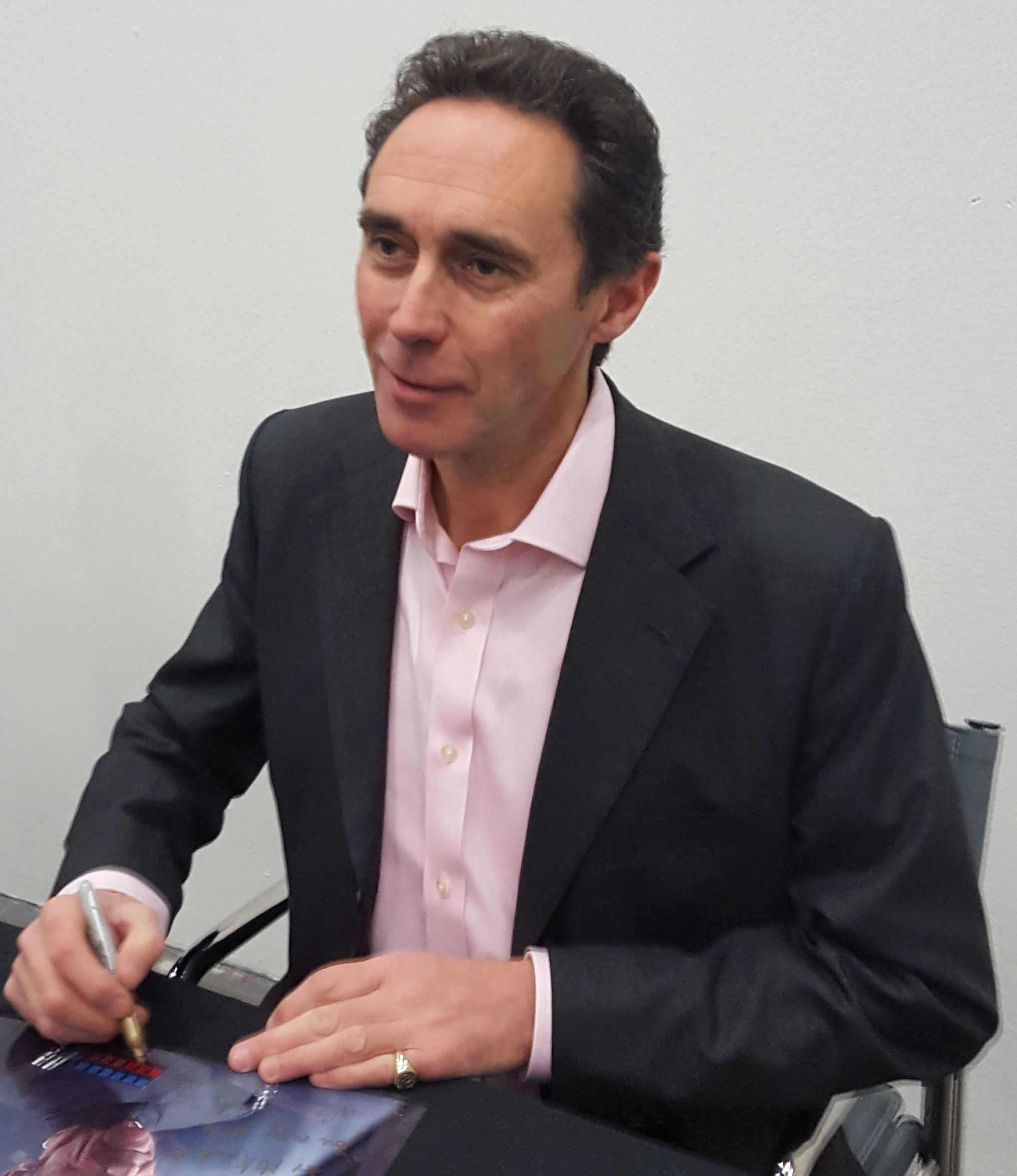
Guy Henry portrays Henrik Hanssen, who finally finds love in the episode.

The episode did not just revolve around Jac's death as other regular character's stories were given a conclusion. Marcel explained "it's a nod to everyone who worked on the show." Dawn Steele who plays Ange Godard revealed that her character gains closure in the final episode. Ange shares her final scene on the AAU ward with her fiancée Josh Hudson (Trieve Blackwood-Cambridge) and her son Dominic, where they are all at peace with one another. Steele said it was "full of emotion" and "it really finishes all our story off really nicely, but with a kind of forward thinking into the future, on they go, it's not fully conclusive." Steele told Victoria Wilson from TVTimes that "our final story is emotional. It ties things up and does Ange and Dom's story justice." Another character whose story is given a full conclusion in the episode is Henrik Hanssen (Guy Henry). He teased "a twinkle of happiness" for the character, referring to Henrik going off to be with his love interest Russell "Russ" Faber (Simon Slater). Wadey said that writers chose to have the character finally declare his love for someone in the finale. He added that for Henrik it was the "biggest thing he could ever do in his life." In addition, writers created other smaller stories such as Nicky McKendrick (Belinda Owusu) performing surgery on a beating heart and an ending for the recurring character Alexandra 'Lexy' Dunblane (Jenny Howe). Bob Barrett who plays Sacha Levy added, "it's an incredible and fitting ending."

Producers decided to bring back various characters for the episode, which included Joseph Byrne (Luke Roberts), Mo Effanga (Chizzy Akudolu), Ric Griffin (Hugh Quarshie) Serena Campbell (Catherine Russell) and Bernie Wolfe (Jemma Redgrave). The characters return in scenes depicting organ transplant procedures using Jac's organs. Wadey said that the scenes were used to give viewers "snippets of joy" from Jac's death. He added that having various former cast members in the scenes were to show "that life goes on". It was Marcel's request that Joseph returned for the scenes because she wanted closure for the character's relationship. Marcel said that she "had to fight" for Joseph to collect Jac's organ and transplant it. Producers informed Marcel that Joseph had left his career in surgery to become a general practitioner, but Marcel remained insistent.

Writers paid homage to the NHS in the final scenes of the episode. The hospital staff continue treating patients and responding to emergencies, despite Jac's death. Ames told Calli Kitson from Metro that "the hospital must go on" to represent the NHS and "to show that while other people's lives have dramas going on they still do their job and they still keep going, and that's what we wanted to depict." Davood Ghadami (Eli Ebrahimi) believed the episode did the show's end "a whole a huge amount of justice". He described the structure of the episode as a "slow burn" with a "slow gut punch" by the end. He described the final scenes as "many amazing shots at the end and the conversations between the characters" with a "definitive end to something that continues." Wadey said that he "loved" the final scenes with Jac's monologue because "it makes sense in that moment."

=== Filming ===
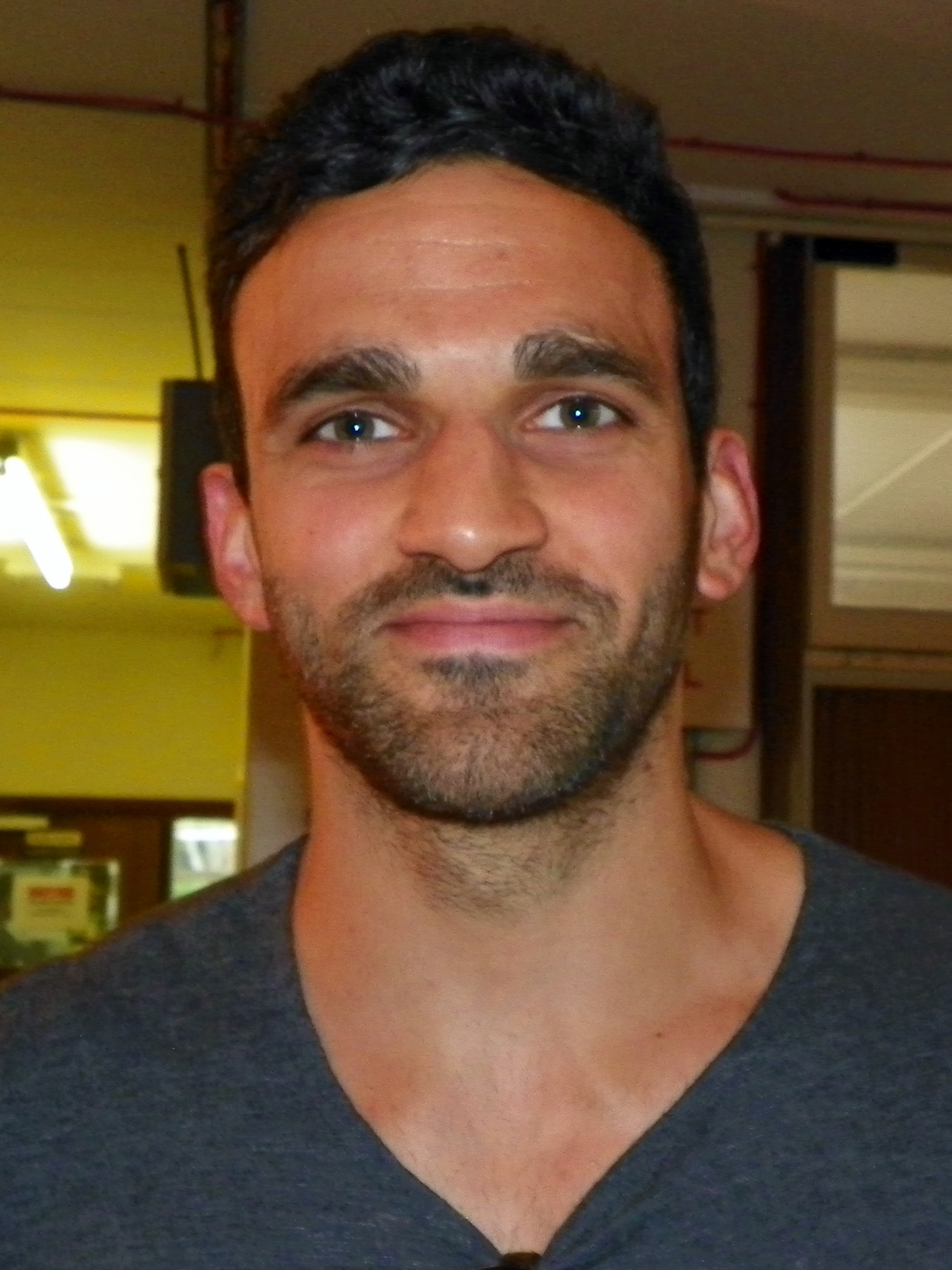
Davood Ghadami who plays Eli Ebrahimi stated that filming the episode was a "tough" experience.

Details regarding the filming of "Episode 1102" were well documented via the cast's social media accounts due to the finality of the episode. Filming concluded on 17 December 2021 and subsequently various cast members were emotional. Ghadami said it was a "tough" experience and he was not ready to say goodbye to the show. Belinda Owusu (Nicky McKendrick) felt lucky to be working on the episode and Ames stated that "emotions are running high but we have pretend lives to save." With the show's imminent end, Bradley and Marcel were emotional in-between and they tried to utilise this emotion during filming the sad scenes.

Marcel later told Tyler that the final episodes were some of the best from the show's history. She explained that because the BBC forced its end, the cast delivered "something outstanding". Marcel explained that the attitude on set was "sod them - were going to do this to the best of our ability." Filming the show's final scenes was documented via a series of interviews, which were combined and released on the official Holby City website for their behind the scenes content. Cast members described their experiences filming on sets and locations for the final time. A drone was used for filming the outro scenes of the episode. It raised high above the hospital and filmed the cast performing emergency medicine for a final time. Wadey stated that he "loved" the shot because it perfectly depicted their role in saving lives.

== Promotion and broadcast ==
External videos
- "Whatever It Takes"; A promotional trailer for the episode
- "Jac"; A preview clip for the episode
- "Another Crack at It"; A preview clip for the episode

In the build up to the episode's broadcast, cast members such as Rosie Marcel and Alex Walkinshaw gave interviews with press to promote the show's end. Ahead of the episode's release, former cast members filmed good-bye messages to commemorate the end of Holby City. The full details of the episode were kept a secret until it was broadcast.

On 22 March 2022, the BBC released a spoiler clip from the episode. On 25 March, a promotional trailer for the episode which also featured archive footage was broadcast. Sam Warner from Digital Spy branded the trailer "emotional" and warned viewers that it meant the episode would garner similar emotion. An additional spoiler clip was showcased on the day of "Episode 1102's" broadcast.

The episode premiered on BBC One on 29 March 2022 at 7:50 PM and was available to watch or download on BBC iPlayer for eleven months after its broadcast. It was also repeated on BBC Two on 4 April 2022.

== Reception ==
The episode was watched live by 3.1 million viewers. Gemma Jones of the Liverpool Echo branded Jac's death as "emotional" to the point it left fans "heartbroken" and in tears. David Brown from Radio Times branded Jac's demise a metaphor for Holby City's end in which neither could be saved. Brown praised writers for keeping the episode's emphasis on the regular characters of the show rather than opting for "some crash-bang-wallop stunt". He concluded that the cameo appearances from past characters were "poignant". His colleague Laura Denby added that Jac's demise was the "ending nobody wanted". She also praised Jac's consistent writing in which she continues to make sarcastic comments despite facing death. Denby concluded that producers were correct to kill Jac off because a series finale episode needs a "game-changing narrative" to create a "big farewell". Claire Ruck from TVTimes chose the episode as their drama pick of the week to watch. She stated "what a watch" and branded the show "brilliant" in the build up to the finale. The episode was selected as a television highlight of the day by John Byrne for RTÉ, and Caroline Delaney for The Irish Examiner. Kevin Courtney of The Irish Times chose the episode as one of "the best shows to watch this week". He added that the decision to cancel the show was "shocking". Elaine Reilly from What's on TV chose the episode in the magazines "hot TV" of the week feature. She called the episode an "emotional farewell" and opined that it is a "tear-jerker and a goodbye to remember". Their colleague Victoria Wilson, this time writing for Whattowatch.com said that various returning characters gave the show a "fitting finale" for a continuing drama. Wilson also wrote a feature counting down the top five moments from the episode.

Sue Haasler from Metro praised the episode and the inclusion of "humour in among all the tragedy" as characters recount their favourite insults that Jac made. She stated that Jac's death created a "profound story" of the NHS continuing despite death. She branded the retrieval of Jac's organs as "beautiful final scenes" and the finale scene "a love letter to the NHS". Sophie Dainty opined that the episode scripts were realistic regarding Jac's death. Dainty reasoned that her death was unavoidable because creating a miracle cure would have appeared too fictitious. She declared that Jac dying with the show itself was "visceral and immeasurably sad" and "felt entirely poignant, if not utterly heartbreaking." Dainty concluded that the episode contained "subtle irony to overt symbolism" and overall it was "a celebration" of the NHS, Jac Naylor, Holby City and its fans.

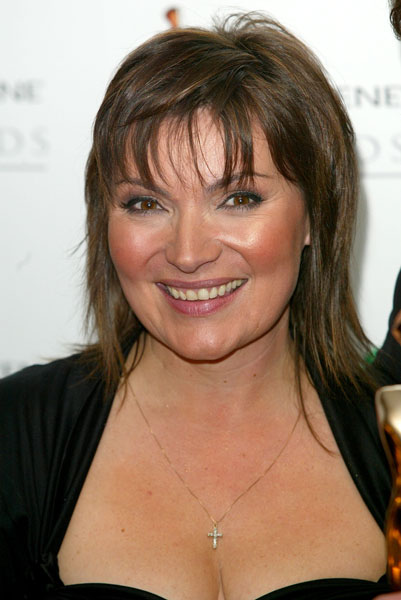
Television presenter Lorraine Kelly praised the episode.

Hannah Verdier from The Guardian praised Holby City for not relying on sensation to end the series. She said that unlike Brookside and Eldorado, the show gave a final episode "far more dignified" by "going out gracefully" with a "beautifully and subtly played goodbye." Verdier believed that Jac's death from a quiet stroke rather than a dramatic stunt was "all the more powerful". She concluded that the episode is "full of warmth and a great fondness for the NHS" and it "celebrates a hospital full of characters with good intentions." Judith Woods from The Daily Telegraph branded it a "beautifully-judged finale", "the most powerful encomium" and "the most poignant love letter to the NHS". Woods said it contained digs at the Conservative party and "only a churl" would not "cheer" with its final scene. She concluded that the episode was "dignified, deeply moving and written with great mastery" and "had all the heft of an ending without feeling like the end." The episode featured alternate credits depicting former cast members. Louis Chilton from The Independent described the credits as "a mournful, slowed-down version" of the Holby City theme. Chilton branded the episode an "emotional finale" and the final scenes "a heartfelt tribute to the NHS."

Alex Ross from Hits Radio branded the episode the "end of an era" with a "tragic ending". He believed that viewers were given a "complete shock, with many devastated at the script." Alice Dear from Heart radio opined that the episode "paid tribute to the NHS" and stated that viewers applauded the writers, cast and the production team. Television presenter Lorraine Kelly praised the episode and stated "what a truly beautiful and fitting ending." Rebecca Cook writing for the Daily Mirror stated that it was an "emotional final episode" and "final poignant tribute" to the NHS. Cook thought Jac's death was the "tragic centrepiece of the episode" and Henrik and Russ' scene a "touching final reunion". Mollie Quirk, also from Daily Mirror stated that "fans were left devastated" by the ending. She opined that Max and Sacha's reaction to Jac's inevitable death created "emotional scenes". Cathy Owen from Wales Online believed "it was emotional for different reasons" including Jac's death alongside Max and Sacha's reactions. They described the episode's ending as "heartbreaking closing moments" and noted fans were expressing their upset via social media networks. Jessica Sansome of Manchester Evening News believed that the episode was effective in showing the possible lives that organ donation can save. She also noted that it portrayed the dedication of NHS colleagues positively.
