= Josh Hudson =

Fictional character from the BBC medical drama Holby City

- Holby City character
- First appearance: Episode 1034; 10 November 2020
- Last appearance: Episode 1102; 29 March 2022
- Portrayed by: Trieve Blackwood-Cambridge

In-universe information
- Occupation: F2 doctor (prev. F1 doctor)
- Significant other: Ange Godard
- Relatives: Elaine Hudson (mother); Isabella "Izzy" Hudson (daughter); Alistair Hudson (son)

Josh Hudson is a fictional character from the BBC medical drama Holby City, played by actor Trieve Blackwood-Cambridge. He first appears in the twenty-sixth episode of series twenty-two, originally broadcast on 10 November 2020. The character and Blackwood-Cambridge's casting details were announced on 29 October 2020. He began filming in July 2020 following a production break enforced by the COVID-19 pandemic and therefore had to film under strict safety protocol. Josh is characterised as a charming, confident, energetic and cheeky foundation doctor (F1). He starts his rotation at Holby City Hospital alongside F1s Jeong-Soo Han (Chan Woo Lim) and Skylar Bryce (Phoebe Pryce); they often feature together in their early stories.

Most of Josh's stories revolve around his relationship with consultant Ange Godard (Dawn Steele), which is marred by the ethics of a junior doctor-mentor romance and the age difference between them. Light relief scenes were created through the secretive nature of the relationship. Blackwood-Cambridge and Steele filmed close contact scenes for the pair after isolating for a week before filming. The relationship was challenged through the introduction of Josh's mother, Elaine Hudson (Carol Walton), and Ange becoming pregnant with twins. Writers coincided the twins' premature birth with a bomb explosion at the hospital, leaving the lives of Josh, Ange and his new family unit in danger.

Producers used the character to explore the issue of bulimia nervosa over several months. Josh begins struggling after becoming a father and beginning a new rotation on the cardiothoracic unit. A friendship with clinical lead Eli Ebrahimi (Davood Ghadami) was established as Josh struggles to tell Ange. The story develops when he begins therapy, where he meets Claudia Blaise (Lottie Tolhurst). When Holby City was cancelled, writers had to conclude Josh's stories. Claudia was killed off, which inspires Josh to seek further help. Josh and Ange's relationship was also given a positive ending. The character and his stories were received well by television critics. Sam Thomas praised the character's bulimia plot in a feature for the Metro.

== Casting ==
Holby City was forced to suddenly suspend production in March 2020 due to the COVID-19 pandemic and did not resume until July 2020. For its return, producers created a series of new characters, including three foundation doctors (F1s). The show's casting team hired actor Trieve Blackwood-Cambridge to play junior doctor Josh Hudson. Chan Woo Lim and Phoebe Pryce were also cast as fellow junior doctors Jeong-Soo Han and Skylar Bryce, respectively. Josh and Blackwood-Cambridge's casting details were announced on 29 October 2020. Kate Oates, the head of continuing drama at BBC Studios, described Josh as one of the "exciting new characters" being introduced. The characters were introduced in the show's first episode after the production break. Blackwood-Cambridge had to film under strict COVID-19 protocols to maintain safety for cast and crew. This includes filming from a safe two-metre distance, which results in the editing team merging separately filmed scenes together. The actor explained that he had to sometimes act opposite a tennis ball to make this happen, which he found "difficult".

== Development ==
=== Characterisation and early storylines ===
Cheeky-chappy Josh cannot wait to get cracking on the wards – he's spent six years slogging away in the library and now it's time to enjoy the fruits of his late night labours. Unlike some terrified F1's you won't find Josh cowering behind a bedpan in the linen cupboard: if there's a crisis you'll always find him grinning in the thick of it!

— An excerpt from Josh's profile on the official Holby City website.

Josh is characterised as a confident, "cheeky-chappy" F1 doctor who is fresh out of university, ready to start his first rotation at Holby City Hospital. Josh is not afraid to tackle challenging cases, in contrast to other junior doctors. A writer from the official Holby City website said that Josh is "always raring to go and buzzing with energy". Despite his "arrogant and cocky" exterior, Josh has "heart of gold". He is charming and on shift, he flirts with elderly female patients and exchanges fitness stories with men of a similar age to himself. Blackwood-Cambridge described Josh as "great at his job, funny, caring and thoughtful... All the qualities of a fine young man." He likes that Josh will defend his beliefs, even if it gets him in trouble, as showcased when he defends Skylar against Michael Townsend (Elliot Levey), the chairman of the hospital board.

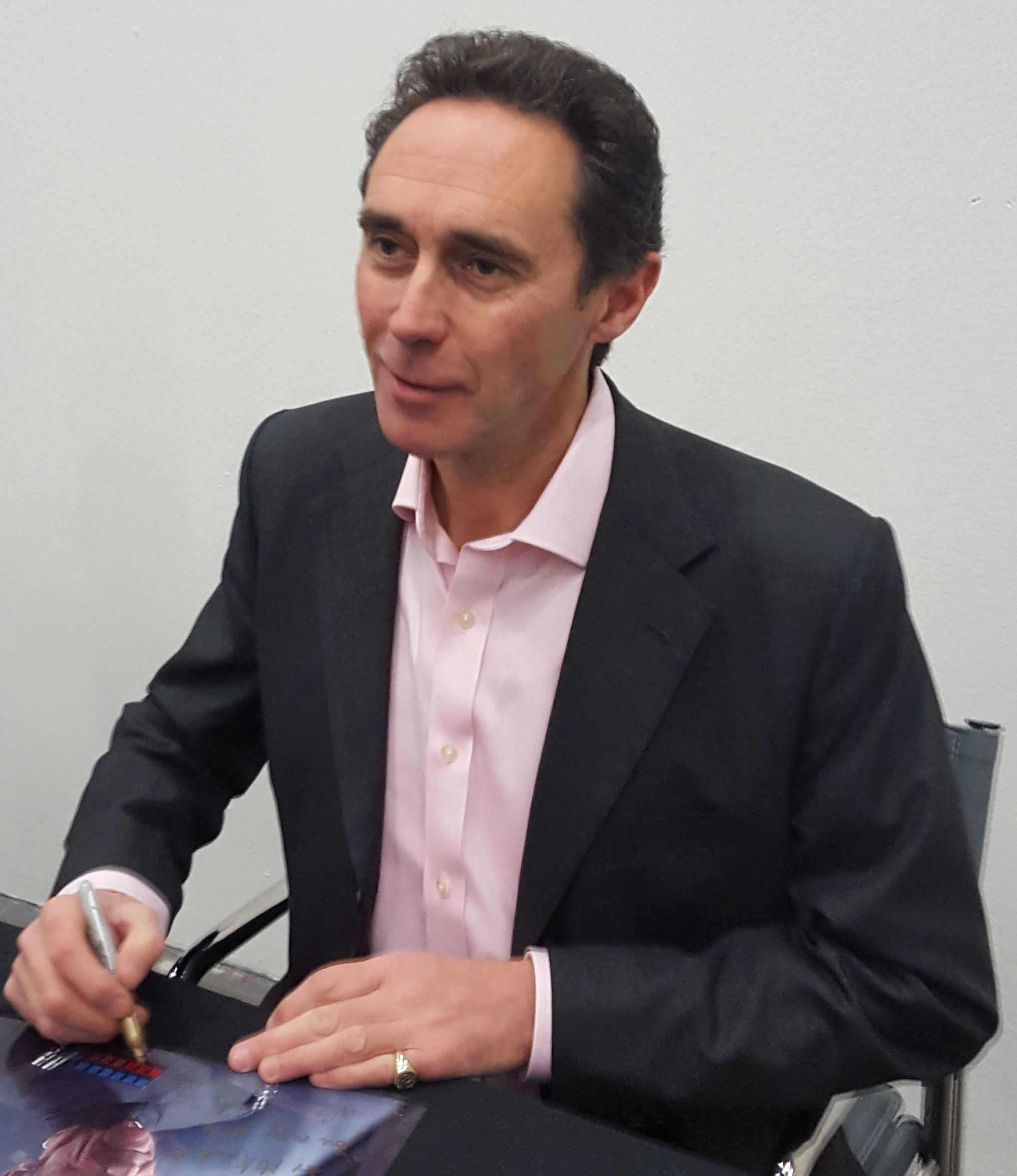
In an early story, Josh supports Henrik Hanssen (Guy Henry, pictured) with his self-harming.

Josh is introduced during series 22 in the show's 1034th episode, which premiered on 4 November 2020. Josh begins working across the hospital wards alongside Jeong-Soo and Skylar during the middle of the COVID-19 pandemic. Their first episode explores the impact of COVID-19 on the hospital, mirroring the struggles of the National Health Service (NHS). Writers used the characters to highlight how junior doctors were facing the pandemic as newly-qualified medics. The F1s are immediately "thrown in at the deep end" when they are sent straight into work by senior consultant Henrik Hanssen (Guy Henry) with only a short welcome. Josh's early stories see him tasked by Hanssen to work together on cases with Jeong-Soo and Skylar. In one story, the trio work their first New Year's Eve shift, which Josh finds dull especially when he is given "an apparently mundane case".

Producers later incorporated Josh into Hanssen's story about self-harm. Whilst in the hospital basement, Josh discovers Hanssen self-harming. Josh immediately tries to offer Hanssen some support, but he rejects it and warns Josh that if he tells anyone, he will end his career. Henry told Victoria Wilson of What to Watch that Hanssen is "embarrassed and horrified" as Josh finds him. Josh continues to try and support Hanssen and they have "a powerful heart to heart", which results in Hanssen seeking help.

=== Relationship with Ange Godard ===
Producers paired Josh romantically with consultant Ange Godard (Dawn Steele). Writers subtly included hints to a relationship in scenes after Josh is introduced, but it was only confirmed in a promotional trailer for the show's 2021 episodes. Ange's feelings towards Josh emerge after he claims to have had sex with a patient to protect Jeong-Soo. When the truth is revealed, Ange appears pleased, which Sophie Dainty of Digital Spy suggested could mean she has "a secret crush" on Josh. The pair's flirtation advances when Ange reprimands Josh and they have sex. When Ange returns to work after a period of leave, Josh tries to reduce her workload. Josh performs a tricky procedure on a patient alone which should be performed by a consultant. This annoys Ange, but she appreciates his efforts for her; acting on their "palpable spark", they have sex in the on-call room. In the aftermath, Josh becomes keen to make their hookups more regular, while Ange wants them to be kept secret from their colleagues. The secretive nature of the pairing allowed writers to create light relief scenes for the show. During one hookup, Ange tries to stop them from being found together, leaving Josh forced to return to the ward naked.

The relationship is marred by its unethical status as junior doctor/mentor romances are frowned upon. The show's promotional trailer teased that the relationship would eventually be exposed to Hanssen, the hospital CEO, leading Ange to choose between her career and relationship. Writers introduced Ange's daughter, registrar Chloe Godard (Amy Lennox), into the story when she develops a crush on Josh. This comes as Ange becomes uncertain about progressing the relationship. Josh informs Ange that someone else is interested in him, so they reaffirm their commitment to each other and become "mutually exclusive". Chloe and Ange's son, Dominic Copeland (David Ames), are then shocked to later spot Josh and Ange walking out of the on-call room together.

Dom reports Josh and Ange to Hanssen, who conducts an investigation into the allegations. Both Josh and Ange are "unapologetically transparent" about their relationship and share all locations in which they had sex at work, shocking Hanssen. Although Josh hopes they can now go public, Ange decides to end it. The actors filmed the scenes at close proximity, unlike other scenes in the show which were all filmed at a distance due to COVID-19 restrictions. To be able to do this, Blackwood-Cambridge and Steele isolated in a hotel for a week before filming the episode block. Steele enjoyed filming at close proximity with another actor again and documented it in an Instagram post. Josh struggles with Ange's decision and decides to transfer to another hospital. On shift, Josh and Ange work together to treat a critically ill mother and baby and soon realise they make "a dream team". Combined with learning about the death of their colleague Kian Madani (Ramin Karimloo), the pair gain "some much-needed perspective". Ange realises that she cannot let Josh leave, so they recommence their relationship.

=== Pregnancy ===
Producers challenged Josh and Ange's relationship by making Ange pregnant with twins. The storyline highlighted the pair's age difference and introduced Josh's mother, Elaine Hudson (Carol Walton). Elaine disagrees with the age gap between Josh and Ange and believes that Josh is "throwing away his future". Blackwood-Cambridge noted that Josh feels that he has to "overcompensate" for the age difference. Ange is experiencing menopausal symptoms and combined with Elaine's views, she worries that she is preventing Josh from having children. She tries ending the relationship again, but Josh refuses to let her. Later, Ange realises that she has not actually been experiencing menopause, but is actually pregnant. Ange confides in Chloe and nurse Kylie Maddon (Amy Murphy) about the news, and they devise a pros and cons list. Kylie accidentally tells Josh about Ange's pregnancy. Whilst Josh is instantly supportive of Ange, she is unsure what to do about the pregnancy. Josh tries to prove to Ange that he is ready for fatherhood. They both agree that they want to be parents and go for their first ultrasound.

Writers created dramatic scenes for the birth of Josh and Ange's twins as she gives birth prematurely in the midst of a bomb explosion at the hospital. The story team scheduled these scenes to occur over a series of episodes. The birth is set up when Josh and Ange learn that one of the twins require a blood transfusion and Ange undergoes a surgery with Josh and Chloe at her side. Ange soon suffers complications and has to have an emergency caesarean. At the same time, Josh and Chloe learn that Cameron Dunn (Nic Jackman) has set a bomb to explode in the hospital basement. A show insider explained that although Josh is worried and wants to move Ange, a potential move would harm Ange and the babies. The bomb explodes and the show's publicity team left the identities of those injured under embargo until the following episode. In the aftermath of the explosion, Josh and Chloe are revealed to be safe, although Ange's fate remains in doubt. A "panic-stricken" Josh and Chloe work together to save the lives of Ange and the babies. Despite Josh's overwhelming anxiety over the situation, they are successful in delivering the children and saving Ange's life. Ange struggles emotionally after giving birth, but Josh helps her and is "lovingly supportive" on the front.

=== Bulimia ===
"On the surface it may seem that Josh is rising to the challenge, but underneath it all he's barely staying afloat. What drives Josh through is his self-inflicted pressure to be the person everyone expects him to be. In his mind, he's a failure if he's not excelling in every aspect of his life, which of course is a recipe for disaster."

—Trieve Blackwood-Cambridge discussing how Josh copes with his responsibilities. (2021)

Producers used the character of Josh to explore the issue of bulimia nervosa. Blackwood-Cambridge felt proud to explore the topic "through a different lens" as he felt that bulimia in men was less discussed. He researched the subject extensively, including watching Freddie Flintoff: Living With Bulimia and speaking to people with bulimia. The actor hoped that the story would inspire those with bulimia to seek support. In his backstory, Josh suffered bulimia while caring for his mother and studying for his A-level exams. The story begins in the aftermath of his children's traumatic birth as he struggles to manage his home life with his career. Blackwood-Cambridge explained that the trauma of the birth, the "rough" pregnancy, the health of the babies and his mother, and his relationship with Ange contributed to the bulimia relapse. Dainty (Digital Spy) billed the storyline as a "big, new plot" for Holby City.

As part of his F1 rotation, Josh is transferred to Darwin, the hospital's cardiothoracic ward. Writers reintroduced Josh's mother Elaine into the show as she recognises that he is not coping with his responsibilities as a father, partner and F1. On this, Blackwood-Cambridge commented, "On the surface it may seem that Josh is rising to the challenge, but underneath it all he’s barely staying afloat." They also created a friendship between Josh and Darwin's clinical lead, Eli Ebrahimi (Davood Ghadami), as part of the story. The pair bond over their respective struggles and decide to start jogging together as a form of "escape from their hectic lives". Blackwood-Cambridge stated that Josh idolises Eli as he is "everything you could want - a successful doctor, who is highly praised and respected by all". Josh also impresses senior surgeon Jac Naylor (Rosie Marcel) when he secures a big trial for the hospital. Jac decides to challenge Josh in his work, which Eli becomes concerned about. Josh makes errors throughout the day as he feels the pressure and he eventually suffers a panic attack in secret.

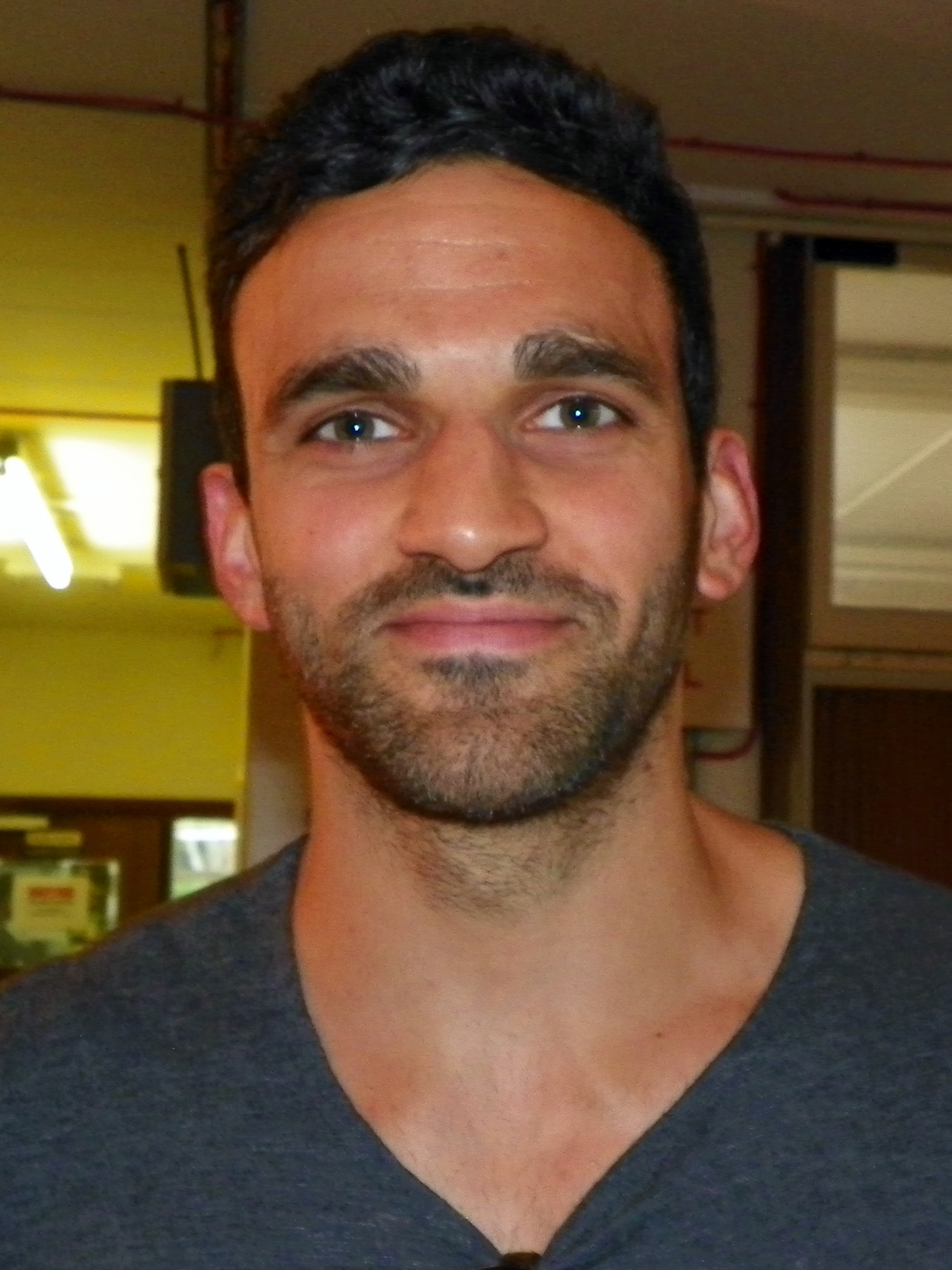
Josh is supported by his mentor, Eli Ebrahimi (Davood Ghadami, pictured).

Josh falls into a cycle of running in excess, binge-eating and purging on food. Blackwood-Cambridge told Victoria Wilson from What to Watch that it is "controlled chaos" as the cycle makes him feel in control. The actor commented, "The relief he gets from this cycle is addictive and incredibly hard for him to overcome." He uses caffeine pills, which then impacts his surgical performance, so he is disciplined by Eli and Jac. Elaine becomes concerned about Josh, especially after a conversation with Ange about his exercise routine. She confronts her son and explains that she is worried that he may be relapsing. He reassures her, but later nearly collapses from exhaustion and declines a meal with Ange. The story is developed when Josh confides in Eli. On his birthday, Josh struggles with Ange's food-based plans and makes himself sick. As his work begins to suffer, Josh confides in Eli but rejects his advice when Eli suggests that he tells Ange. Blackwood-Cambridge explained that Josh's decision not to tell Ange stems from his "insecurity of their age difference". He added that Josh is worried that Ange may view him differently. He commented, "Josh fears that opening up to Ange, and being transparent about his eating disorder will weaken him in her eyes."

Eli struggles to keep Josh's secret and tells him to seek help from his general practitioner (GP) or he will tell Ange himself. Josh decides to speak to his GP after being made to feel "more alone than ever" following Ange's choice not to return to work yet. He is informed that he may have to wait months to receive therapy. Josh leaves his patient unattended, leaving them in danger. He struggles with this and Blackwood-Cambridge said that Josh believes that "he failed his patient, and in some way failed the hospital and his family". As a result of this, Josh starts bingeing and purging again. Josh eventually confides in Ange and she is very supportive. She promises not to "mother him" as long as Josh talks to her about his treatment. When one of Josh's patient dies, Ange instantly becomes over concerned, annoying Josh. She later explains that she is trying hard to "find the right balance between supporting him but not being overbearing".

=== Claudia Blaise and final stories ===
Lottie Tolhurst was cast in the story as Claudia Blaise, a physiotherapist who attends the same group therapy session as Josh. Blackwood-Cambridge described Claudia as "outspoken with immense charm" and said that she bonds with Josh over their similar experiences. Josh is worried about attending the therapy as he does not want to confront his own past. Blackwood-Cambridge commented, "Therapy is too triggering, too painful for Josh to navigate." Josh struggles at the session and leaves early, but lies to Ange that it was successful. Blackwood-Cambridge stated that Josh lies to "put [Ange's] mind at ease". He also opined that the recovery could negatively impact on Josh and Ange's relationship.

Josh and Claudia meet again and she encourages him to try another group therapy session. Ange sees them together and Claudia is shocked to learn that she is Josh's partner. Ange feels insecure about the age difference between her and Josh after meeting Claudia, and tells Adrian "Fletch" Fletcher (Alex Walkinshaw) that she is worried that Josh could grow bored of their "domesticated life". Spurred on by her conversation with Fletch, Ange proposes to Josh in the hospital memorial garden. This prompts Josh to be honest with Ange over his therapy sessions and admit that he is struggling with his illness. After a discussion over his bulimia, Josh agrees to marry Ange. Comedic scenes were created through the planning of the wedding. When Ange complains about Josh's lack of interest in the wedding planning, her friend Max McGerry (Jo Martin) tricks Josh into believing that Ange wants him to wear a kilt. This makes him take control of the planning, to Ange's delight.

In June 2021, it was announced that Holby City had been cancelled after twenty-three series. The final episode was broadcast in March 2022. Story producer Ben Wadey told Calli Kitson from Metro that the story team had to create suitable endings for all the regular characters. Steele explained that the story concludes as Josh "has to come to terms with [his bulimia] and move forward". She also confirmed that Josh and Ange would receive their own "happy ending" in the end. As part of the end of the bulimia plot, Tolhurst reprised her role as Claudia. In the narrative, Claudia is admitted onto the AAU after struggling with her bulimia. Josh is then "unsettled" to learn that Claudia has faked her recovery in a similar manner to him. Claudia requires emergency surgery but is pronounced dead during the operation, leaving Josh "inconsolable". Grieving, he lashes out at director of nursing Madge Britton (Clare Burt) in the operating theatre. Josh takes on the job of informing Claudia's parents, worrying Ange about his attachment to Claudia. Claudia's death inspires Josh to admit to Ange about his own recovery. He confesses that his bulimia makes him "feel weak and inferior", but Ange reassures him and chastises him for lying to her.

In the show's penultimate episode, Claudia's mother, Anita Blaise (Zoë Aldrich), arrives at the hospital and confronts Josh, believing that he played a role in Claudia's death. She brings along Claudia's diaries, which Dom discovers and accuses Josh of cheating on Ange. Confronted, Josh reveals that the truth about his and Claudia's relationship and promises it was a platonic relationship. He then informs Ange about Dom's accusations. Dom struggles with the revelation of Josh's bulimia as he feels pushed out of the family unit. When he then learns that Chloe has supported Josh, he feels "like an outsider all over again". In the final episode, Josh works with Ange and Dom on reuniting patient Ken Davies (Hamish Clarke) with his family, mirroring their own family reunion in the episode.

== Reception ==
Steven Murphy from What to Watch summarised the character's tenure on Holby City: "Josh had a dramatic time on Holby, battling his eating disorder and negotiating his forbidden romance with Ange". Sue Haasler, writing for the Metro, described the character as "the very wonderful Josh Hudson". Dainty (Digital Spy) called Josh's first shift "a baptism of fire", while Haasler quipped, "What a day to start a new job". She cringed at the dialogue surrounding Josh and Ange's first time having sex and opined that it was not their "most professional moment, given that he's a very junior doctor and she's his manager". Dainty thought Josh and Ange's pairing was predictable. What's on TV's Claire Buck included Chloe discovering Josh and Ange's relationship in her television highlights for the week.

Josh and Ange's reconciliation after working together on an ill mother and baby was listed in the respective television highlights by Victoria Wilson (What's on TV) and Hannah Verdier from The Guardian. The episodes which begin Josh and Ange's pregnancy story arc were included in Buck's television highlights for their respective weeks. Dainty found the birth of Josh and Ange's children emotional and warned viewers, "Trust us, this one's a tearjerker." Columinst Sam Thomas praised Josh's bulimia story in a piece for the Metro. As a man with bulimia, Thomas opined that if he had watched the story as a teenager, he would have been prompted to seek help sooner.
