= Ange Godard =

- Holby City character
- Dawn Steele as Ange Godard
- First appearance: "China Crisis"; 8 January 2019
- Last appearance: "Episode 1102"; 29 March 2022
- Portrayed by: Dawn Steele

In-universe information
- Alias: Angel Godard
- Occupation: Consultant general surgeon; Clinical lead (AAU)
- Family: Dominic Copeland (son); Chloe Godard (daughter); Isabella "Izzy" Godard (daughter); Alistair Godard (son)
- Significant others: Adrian "Fletch" Fletcher; Josh Hudson

Ange Godard is a fictional character from the BBC medical drama Holby City, played by actress Dawn Steele. She first appeared in the series twenty-one episode "China Crisis", broadcast on 8 January 2019. Ange arrives at Holby City hospital to work as a consultant general surgeon on the Young Adult Unit (YAU), a ward she helps to create. Steele was cast in the role following a meeting with the show's production team. She was "delighted" to join the show's cast and it was soon publicised that Ange would have a number of "explosive" secrets, which would then drive Holby City stories forward. Ange is characterised as "ballsy", "tenacious" and "stubborn". Steele has stated that Ange is portrayed as the most emotional surgeon imaginable. Her empathy for patients is often displayed in scenes, which Steele believed was a result of Ange's past experiences.

Ange was introduced into the series alongside returning character Tom Campbell-Gore (Denis Lawson). At the helm of the new YAU ward, writers gave Ange a pivotal role in a right to life story. It focused on the patient Holly Cartwright (Emma Curtis), who is declared brain dead and being aided by a life support system. Ange assists the patient's family but also advocates for the hospital's right to remove life support. The topical story also drew comparison to real life cases. Her secrets soon became the focus of her storylines. First came the revelation that her colleague, Dominic Copeland (David Ames), is her biological son that she had previously placed for adoption. Steele later revealed that she felt the story was divisive amongst viewers because of the emotional drama it caused Dominic. Then her daughter, Chloe Godard (Amy Lennox) was introduced and writers explored their backstory detailing that Chloe was conceived after Ange was raped.

Other stories for the character have focused on her feud with Chloe's manipulative boyfriend Evan Crowhurst (Jack Ryder) and a relationship with Adrian "Fletch" Fletcher (Alex Walkinshaw). The character was received positively due to Steele's acting abilities. David Brown writing for the Radio Times praised Steele's portrayal during the right to life story. Sue Haasler of the Metro complimented her performance during the adoption secret revelation and Bill Gibbs from The Sunday Post said Steele "relished" the role.

== Casting ==
On 19 September 2018, it was announced that actress Dawn Steele was cast in the role of Ange. Steele spent more than two years commuting to Glasgow while appearing in fellow BBC production, River City. Steele left the series and wanted acting work closer to home. Steele first learned about the role in the British summer of 2018 and thought the show's studios were more suitably located. Steele attended a meeting with the production team and the following day she received a telephone call offering her the part. Jonathon Hughes from the Radio Times reported that Ange would arrive at Holby City hospital to work as a general surgeon, who opens a new treatment unit. He added that Ange has "explosive secrets that will send shockwaves through the hospital." Steele was "delighted" to join the show's cast and stated "Ms Godard is such a great character with lots to tell and I am really looking forward to getting on that Keller Ward and bringing her to life."

== Development ==
=== Introduction ===
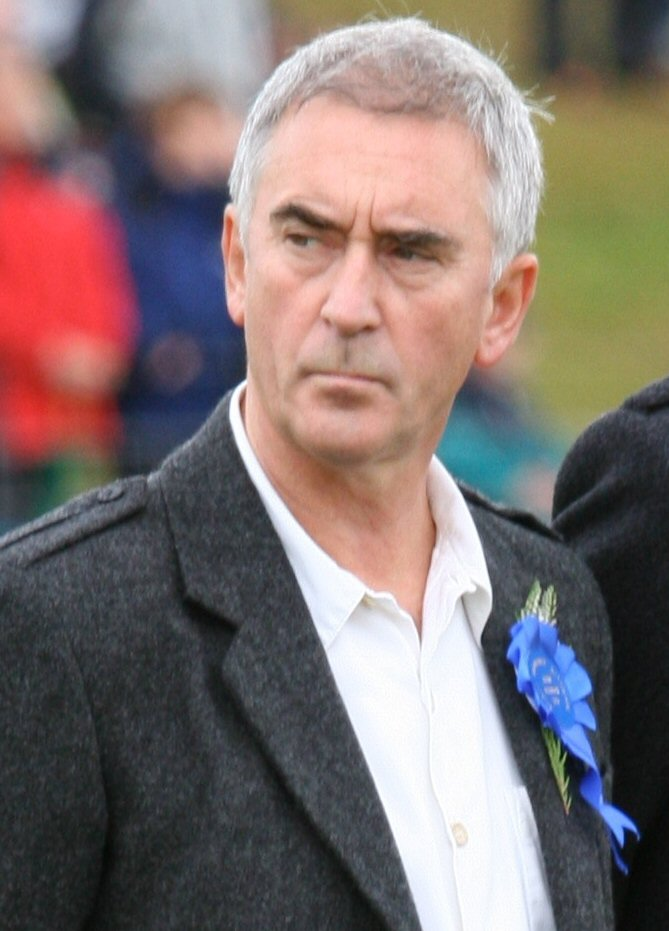
Denis Lawson portrays Tom Campbell-Gore, the character used to aid Ange's introduction into the series.

Producers introduced Ange as part of a new family unit working at the hospital. Prior to her first appearance it was announced that Amy Lennox had been hired to play Ange's daughter Chloe Godard and Jack Ryder as Chloe's boyfriend, Evan Crowhurst. Their introduction was part of the producer's efforts to take Holby City in a new direction in regards to storylines. Sophie Dainty from Digital Spy reported that Ange would arrive in a special episode in which she helps to open the "swanky new unit". She added that Ange was set to take "centre-stage in several big stories throughout the year", more so with the arrival of Chloe and Evan. Preparing for the role was challenging for Steele, who found learning large amounts of medical terminology "difficult". She told Bill Gibb from The Sunday Post that "I've not studied for seven years to be a doctor so saying all the medical words naturally – and often without emotion – was quite hard as an actor." She enjoyed learning how to act out operations, but found day-long filming with prosthetics and faux blood tiring. She added that it became easier with a qualified surgeon and scrub nurse on set to help her.

Ange made her debut in the series twenty-one episode "China Crisis", which was broadcast on 8 January 2019. Producers planned to develop the character rapidly from her debut. Steele told Gibb that "I hit the ground running when I joined Holby and was in every single episode as they hammered out my character." Writers gave Ange an immediate link to a former character producers had reintroduced into the story, Tom Campbell-Gore (Denis Lawson). Ange works alongside Tom to set up the Young Adult Unit (YAU) on Keller Ward. Steele already knew Lawson professionally. She was thankful of this because one of the first scenes she filmed involved administering CPR on him.

The YAU specialises in helping young adults from the age of 14 to 24. It focuses on pastoral care that a consultant such as Ange can offer post surgery. Steele told Laura-Jayne Tyler from Inside Soap that Ange had a "unique selling point" to run the ward because "she is all about being honest in attempting to help these young men and women." Ange's first medical case occurs when teenager Duncan McKenzie (Tim Preston) is admitted to YAU with a stab injury. She puts patient care first despite evidence of a crime being committed. She also clashes with the hospital CEO Henrik Hanssen (Guy Henry) over the case. Writers quickly placed Ange in a position of power on the ward. Tom also suffers from a heart attack, which puts Ange solely in charge of running the YAU and she has to prove she is able.

=== Characterisation ===
Come up against Ange at your peril, she's as stubborn and tenacious as they come and will never back down from a fight – she learned that the hard way. With Ange, what you see is what you get –loud, funny and ballsy as hell. She can't abide a goody-two shoes and she'll put patient over policy every single time – a method that's not ingratiated her with many bosses. Her no-nonsense approach can appear severe to colleagues but there's no hiding her huge capacity for empathy.

— An excerpt from Ange's profile on the official Holby City website.

Ange is characterised as "ballsy", "tenacious" and "stubborn". These traits mean Ange will not back down from a fight and she has a "no-nonsense approach" to work and her colleagues. She is not afraid to breach hospital policy if she believes it is in the interest of her patients. She is also portrayed as extremely empathetic to patients and her approach makes her a favourite amongst admissions to the YAU. Writers have created a back story for Ange, which includes her origins of being raised by a hard working-class family from Glasgow. Ange's parents enforced the belief that she could do anything if she worked hard enough. Their influence led Ange's determination to become successful in medicine. Steele has branded Ange as "probably the most emotional surgeon that you will ever see on Holby." She stated that Ange did not practise the same detachment process between herself and patients that many other doctors do. While interviewed on Lorraine Steele said that on-set surgeon had told her they had never met anyone like Ange, because surgeons are normally "hardened" to the emotional side of the cases. Steele revealed that Ange behaves "with all this empathy" because of her past experiences.

=== Right to life issue ===
Ange played a central role in a right to life story devised by scriptwriters. The story focuses on YAU patient Holly Cartwright (Emma Curtis), who is declared brain dead and being aided by a life support system. Ange and her colleagues agree that she is medically brain dead and seek to remove her life support. Holly's parents Ruth Cooper (Marianne Oldham) and Michael Cartwright (Christopher Harper) fight the hospital board over her care plan, which results in the matter being sent to court. The story began onscreen in January 2019, when Holly was admitted to Holby City hospital and placed into Ange's care. She enlisted her daughter Chloe to assist on the case. Ange and Chloe encountered problems during a surgical operation which resulted in Holly sustaining brain damage. The story's conclusion is heavily featured in the show's "A Simple Lie" episodes which focus on the court ruling and the trouble caused by right to life protesters that gather outside the hospital.

Ruth and Michael still believe that they can take Holly to the US for treatment, despite the court ruling that life support must be removed. Steele compared the story to the real life Charlie Gard case, which occurred in 2017. She told Victoria Wilson of What's on TV that the similarities were that "Holly's parents are trying to fight for a life that physically isn't there any more. As with that case, the press have got hold of it, people are protesting and the hospital is under pressure." David Brown writing for the Radio Times agreed that the story closely followed the Charlie Gard and later Alfie Evans case, with scenes of "vituperative protesters" gathering at the hospital.

The protesters use Ange as a target for their anger. When Henrik addresses the media and protesters about the court ruling, tensions escalate and a protester throws cold tomato soup over Ange. Steele explained that her character is a "strong woman, so she can cope, but it's still shocking." Ange's colleague Adrian "Fletch" Fletcher (Alex Walkinshaw) jumps to her defence, but the crowd start chanting that Ange is a murderer. Steele had to play Ange as an isolated figure in the incident, but added it was nice to have Fletch's support. The episode culminates in the revelation that protesters have leaked Ange's home address online. She is given a police escort as her safety is severely compromised. The story also plays on the disappearance of Theo Fletcher (Stanley Rabbetts), who is presumed to have been abducted by protesters. Ange leaves her safe house to help Fletch search. Steele said that her character feels responsible for bringing the protesters to the hospital and wants to help. She concluded that by the end of the episode "we soon find out that it's really not Ange's fault", as former employee Amira Zafar (Poppy Jhakra) is caught.

=== Adoption secret ===
"David Ames was told two years ago that they were going to bring in his birth mother, and that it was going to be a big storyline, so he'd known about it for a while. But for me to come in on that story, I knew it would be a big one in terms how the audience perceived it, and the way in which it affected the characters. And it was so full on, I was in every scene, every day, crying all the time."

— Dawn Steele discussing the adoption story. (2019)

Producers used the character to portray a story which featured the discovery that Ange's colleague, Dominic Copeland (David Ames) is her biological son. In her backstory it was determined that Ange became pregnant with Dominic when she was a teenager and gave him up for adoption. The story had been in development for years prior. Producers and writers had previously discussed the idea Ames, who thought it was a good story. He believed that it helped to explain why he had a difficult relationship with his parents Barry (Nicholas Ball) and Carole Copeland (Julia Deakin). In addition, the character often joked about being adopted which helped the credibility of the story. The story had to be kept a secret, which Ames enjoyed. When Steele was cast as Ange, she and Ames were informed that the story would be developed. Ames told Inside Soap's Tyler that they built a good rapport which helped portray such a "huge plot".

The adoption story was one of Steele's first on the show. She recalled that she would cry during scenes on a daily basis. She told another Inside Soap reporter that the story was "big" and "so full-on". As it was one of Ange's first stories, she was still trying to learn all the complex medical terminology on the show. Steele said that it was one of the biggest challenges of her twenty-year acting career. An episode was produced and designed to inform viewers about the adoption connection between Ange and Carole. It centers around Dominic's birthday which helps Ange realise who he is. Steele told Victoria Wilson (What's on TV) that "this news is massive" and Ange and Carole have an "emotional" exchange in which "lots of secrets are revealed." In the closing moments of the episode Ange goes home to retrieve a shoe box filled with keepsakes about Dominic. Steele added "it's all quite heavy, and it's about to get a lot worse." Dominic soon finds out that he has been adopted when Carole admits the truth. Ange also learns the truth but decides to keep her involvement concealed. Ames told Victoria Wilson from What's on TV that Dominic confides in Ange about his adoption. She gives him an understanding of why someone would give their child away, without revealing the truth. He explains that Carole gave him a good childhood which upsets Ange. Ames explained that he "doesn't realise how emotionally draining that must be for Ange to be giving him all this information and seeing him so upset."

Dominic is shocked when he learns Ange is his biological mother. The truth is revealed while Ange and Dominic are operating on a patient. Ames said it was a standard Holby City revelation where "emotional scenes take place over someone's open chest." Dominic abandons surgery because he cannot deal with the news and "his mind is completely blown." Ames told Tyler that Dominic is "just broken" and "untethered" in the unknown. The reveal scenes required dramatic scripts with emotional exchanges. Ames said that he and Steele had to draw on personal experiences to "get incredibly emotional." In an interview with Sophie Dainty (Digital Spy), Ames explained that Dom wants a relationship with Ange. He added that Dominic "definitely wants to build something with her, even if it's just a friendship. It's such a rocky start though, so hopefully it will grow in the right direction." Writers explored Ange's new role of being a mother to Dominic and Chloe. Ange decides to focus on Chloe which causes issues with Dominic, who feels excluded. Ames told Wilson that his character feels Ange is not making an effort and favouring Chloe. He added "she's struggling, too, with the fact that he's her son." Ange tries to avoid working with Dominic, who purposely sets up a scenario which forces Ange to intervene during an operation. Ange vents her anger over Dominic endangering a patient's life to gain her attention. The subsequent fallout forces Ange to reveal a secret about Chloe's conception.

Steele later reflected that the story was unpopular with viewers because it disrupted the established relationship between Dominic and Carole. She recalled her surprise to see negative fan reactions via the social networks Facebook and Twitter. She added that they did not seem to like Ange because she "upset the apple cart". Steele was content with the reaction adding "that's what it's all about with these big, dramatic storylines - that's what you want. I would much rather play that than be bored."

=== Chloe's story ===
Steele and Lennox worked well together from the beginning. When casting the role of Chloe, Lennox required a screen test with Steele. This came during the filming of the adoption story and Steele was still focused on that work. She recalled that when the screen test occurred that she was "flustered" and had not seen the script prior to the read through. Steele said that Lennox was so "brilliant" that they read well together and the test was successful. Steele, who was then aged 43, believed that Lennox was too old portray her daughter. She told Tyler (Inside Soap) that writers had to change the ages of the characters to add plausibility. Chloe is already a registrar when she arrives at the hospital and has been successful. Steele explained that Ange made an effort to ensure that Chloe would become a "high-flying doctor". The pair have an intense yet "loving relationship" which is "tricky" because of their history. Steele said that writers wanted to explore their troubled history as their stories progressed. Ange enlists Chloe to work at Holby City hospital to help treat Holly Cartwright, but they soon argue. Lennox stated that the pair working together "has its complications" because "they're not on the best of terms."

Ange's relationship with Chloe becomes difficult after she learns that Dominic is her son. Ange begins to focus on Chloe's well-being and avoids helping Dominic. Writers introduced a new secret around Ange and Chloe. The secret was revealed to viewers during the episode "Vinegar and Honey". Ange and Chloe's backstory is fully explained following a confrontation with Dominic. Ange details how she was raped and became pregnant. Having suffered the pain of losing a child when she had Dominic adopted, Ange opted to keep her baby. The scenes also detailed how Chloe was aware of the events and that knowing about Dominic could bring on distress.

In later episodes, Ange rethinks her choice and decides to be truthful to Chloe regarding her half-brother. Dominic is happy with her decision, but Ange remains wary worrying it will cause arguments. Steele explained that "Ange loves her daughter and is continually trying to protect her. They're very similar, so they clash a bit. But deep down they've got a very caring relationship." Ange is happy when Chloe breaks up with her controlling boyfriend Evan. He secures a job role at Holby City hospital, forcing Chloe to work with him. Steele revealed that Ange dislikes Evan and believes that he is an unsuitable partner for her daughter. Ange decides to use her authority to have Evan removed from the ward. He becomes convinced that Ange is plotting against him and concocts his own plan. Evan discovers that Ange and Dominic are hiding a secret and sends an email to Chloe from Ange's computer. Before Ange can tell Chloe the truth, she reads the email and feels deceived. Evan seeks to isolate Chloe and his scheming results in Ange and Chloe's becoming estranged. Steele concluded that Evan's schemes leave Ange and Chloe "in murky waters now, there's a lot to come."

Chloe breaks up with Evan again and Ange offers her support. Evan continues to manipulate Chloe and uses his sister Phoebe Palmer (Daisy Wood-Davis) to make her feel sorry for him. Ange later catches Evan and Phoebe scheming and tells Chloe the truth. Ange continues to play the role of the protective mother. Despite this the story culminates in Evan taking Chloe hostage and she stabs him in self-defence. Ange becomes concerned that Evan will manipulate the courts into believing Chloe tried to murder him. Lennox explained that "Ange has always tried to keep Evan away from Chloe."

=== Relationship with Fletch ===
A relationship was developed between Ange and Director of Nursing, Fletch. Their relationship was first publicised before Ange had even appeared on-screen. An Inside Soap reporter visited the Holby City set and noticed a connection between the characters during filming. Steel told them that she and Walkinshaw were still unaware of writers' plans for their characters, but admitted that they had both predicted it would happen. Their relationship was developed, but their first date was ruined when Fletch reprimanded Ange for working too many hours free of charge.

Writers developed a bond between the pair with Fletch supporting Ange through the "right to life" story and her maternal struggles. Over time it was developed into a romance and Steele was happy with her character's progression. She told What's on TV's Wilson that they work well together because Fletch makes Ange laugh. She described Ange is a "serious" character who needed the "light relief" Fletch's characterisation provides. She thought it was positive writing for Ange who never "had much to laugh about". When Ange decides to confide in Fletch over her worries that her children will not forgive her for keeping secrets, he reassures and supports her. Writers also use the pairing as an outlet for Ange to have more amusing scenes. Steele said that Ange enjoys Fletch's company and thought it was good to show an "intelligent" and "strong female" having fun. They later decide to get together after sharing their first kiss. Steele added "Fletch has been like Ange's guardian angel recently." Steele later reflected that she was happy with their relationship. She branded Walkinshaw as "brilliant" and added "I couldn't of asked for a better first boyfriend on Holby."

== Reception ==
Brown writing for Radio Times praised Steele's strong portrayal of Ange during the right to life story. He said "Dawn Steele and Marianne Oldham both deliver the goods as the medic and the mother at odds over what they think is right for the girl at the centre of it all." The character's numerous dramatic stories drew sympathy from critics. What's on TV's Wilson assessed that "Ange Godard has certainly been through the mill a bit." Filiz Mehmedova of Digital Spy similarly stated "things have not been easy for Holby City's Ange Godard lately." Charlotte Tutton of the Daily Mirror said that Holby City viewers were "desperate" for Ange and Dominic to build a relationship. She added that viewers were "devastated" and "heartbroken" as their dramas continued. Bill Gibbs of The Sunday Post opined "she's a feisty character at the heart of many of the biggest storylines and Dawn has relished getting to grips with being a telly surgeon." A writer from TVTimes included Ange telling Dominic about Chloe's conception in their television "highlights" feature and gave the story a three star rating.

Sue Haasler writing for Metro described Ange as "a feisty, no-nonsense doctor with ambition and drive and also compassion." She branded Ange the "Queen of YAU" and opined that she has "famous people skills". When Ange kicked a locker in anguish, Haasler quipped that she felt like doing the same after watching "after an hour of Ange's anguish." She was also not impressed with the concept of the adoption secret story. She believed it was incompatible with Dominic and Carole's backstory. She was impressed with the portrayal of the story, stating that "it is making for some deeply emotional acting from David Ames, Julia Deakin and Dawn Steele. Their performances lift the story above the realms of soapy cliché." Haasler later gave Ange and Fletch the portmanteau "Flange" which she uses in reference to them. She also believed that Fletch would prefer to be in a relationship with Jac Naylor (Rosie Marcel), adding "I also think if she snapped her fingers he'd drop Ange like a hot brick."
