= Amy Lennox =

Scottish actress

Amy Florence Lennox is a Scottish actress. She is known for her musical theatre work including Kinky Boots and Cabaret, earning a nomination for the Laurence Olivier Award for Best Actress in a Supporting Role in a Musical at the 2016 Laurence Olivier Awards for the former. She was also in the main cast of the medical drama Holby City for three series playing Chloe Godard.

== Early life ==
Amy Lennox is from Aberdeen. She graduated from the Guildford School of Acting.

== Career ==
Lennox played Margot in the original West End cast of Legally Blonde in 2009, for which she also understudied Sheridan Smith in the leading role of Elle Woods. In 2012 she played Doralee Rhodes in the UK touring production of 9 to 5.

In 2011, Lennox performed in the play Decade directed by Rupert Goold for Headlong Theatre, the 12 person cast also included Tobias Menzies. Later in 2011, she performed in the world premiere of Soho Cinders, playing the role of Velcro. The performance was for a charity gala held at the Queen's Theatre. She went on to play the role in the first fully staged production of the show at the Soho Theatre in 2012.

In 2015, she played Cathy Hiatt in The Last Five Years at Lyric Theatre in Belfast alongside the actor Fra Fee. She then played Lauren in the original West End cast of Kinky Boots. She was nominated for both the Laurence Olivier Award for Best Actress in a Supporting Role in a Musical at the 2016 Laurence Olivier Awards and the WhatsOnStage Award for Best Supporting Actress in a Musical at the 2016 WhatsOnStage Awards for her performance.

She played Elly in the David Bowie and Enda Walsh musical Lazarus when it played a limited season at the Kings Cross Theatre from October 2016 to January 2017. She was nominated for the WhatsOnStage Award for Best Supporting Actress in a Musical at the 2017 WhatsOnStage Awards.

In 2018 she played the role of Pocahontas in the new play Ramona Tells Jim also starring Joe Bannister and Ruby Bentall at Bush Theatre in London.

In January 2019 she joined the cast of Holby City, playing Chloe Godard, a CT surgeon and the daughter of the YAU consultant Ange Godard (Dawn Steele).

On 21 March 2022, she took over the role of Sally Bowles in Cabaret at the Playhouse Theatre, starring alongside Fra Fee.

In June 2023, she played the role of Sarah in the new play Spy for Spy also starring Olive Gray at Riverside Studios.

In September 2026 she costars with Rachel Tucker in the world premiere of the musical version of Thelma & Louise at the Young Vic.

== Personal life ==
Lennox met musical theatre actor Tom Andrew Hargreaves while she was in the touring production of 9 to 5 in 2012. They married in October 2021.

== Filmography ==
=== Film ===
Year	Title	Role	Notes
2010	Never Let Me Go	Sitcom Girl	
2012	Wrong Turn 5: Bloodlines	Cruz Wilson	

=== Television ===
Year	Title	Role	Notes
2017	Casualty	Kayleigh Marshall	1 episode
2018	Shetland	Sally McColl	2 episodes
2019–2021	Holby City	Chloe Godard	100 episodes
2024–2026	Only Child	Emily	11 episodes
2026	Blade Runner 2099	TBA	Post-production

=== Video games ===
Year	Title	Role	Notes
2021	Bravely Default II	Lily (voice)	Video game; English dub
2022	Another Eden	Daisy (voice)	Video game; English dub
2022	Arknights	Ch’en (voice), Zima (Voice)	Video game; English dub

== Theatre ==
Year	Title	Role	Theatre	Location
2009	Legally Blonde	Margot / Understudy Elle Woods	Savoy Theatre	West End
2011	Soho Cinders	Velcro	Queen's Theatre	West End
2012	9 to 5	Doralee Rhodes	—N/a	UK National Tour
2015	The Last Five Years	Cathy Hiatt	Lyric Theatre, Belfast	Belfast
2015–16	Kinky Boots	Lauren	Adelphi Theatre	West End
2016–17	Lazarus	Ellie	Kings Cross Theatre	Off-West End
2018	Ramona Tells Jim	Pocahontas	Bush Theatre	Off-West End
2022	Cabaret	Sally Bowles	Playhouse Theatre	West End
2023	Spy for Spy	Sarah	Riverside Studios	Off-West End
2024	Opening Night	Dorothy	Gielgud Theatre	West End
2026	Thelma & Louise	Thelma	Young Vic	Off West End
