= Simon Slater =

- Born: 28 November 1959 (age 66); Scarborough, North Riding of Yorkshire
- Occupations: Music director, composer, narrator, and actor
- Instruments: Piano, double bass, saxophone, clarinet, ukulele
- Website: Official website

Simon Slater (born 28 November 1959) is a British music director, composer, narrator, and actor. He has composed more than 300 original music scores for film, theatre, TV and radio, and is a member of the British Academy of Composers and Songwriters.

In 2010, Slater's narration of Wolf Hall by Hilary Mantel won two awards; an Audie Award for Literary Fiction and an AudioFile magazine Earphone Award. For best sound designer in the 2013 play Constellations, he was nominated an Olivier Award.

== Early life and education ==
Simon Slater was born in Filey Road, Scarborough, North Riding of Yorkshire, the son of a sailor known as the Prospect Of Whitby yachtsman Arthur Slater. As a young child he became inspired by his music teacher at Bramcote School. In 1972, he joined Sedbergh School, where he was a student until 1977. Growing up in Scarborough, he lived not far from the Stephen Joseph Theatre, where his parents took him to see plays by Alan Ayckbourn. Later, he gained admission to Goldsmiths College at the University of London.

== Career ==
Slater has composed more than 300 original music scores for film, theatre, TV and radio, which have included BBC Radio 3, Channel 5, and West End theatre productions. He is a member of the British Academy of Composers and Songwriters.

For three years he worked as a composer on the plays Henry V and Julius Caesar for the Royal Shakespeare Company. He wrote the music for Macbeth, starring Sean Bean and wrote the music for The Blood Libel for Radio 4.

He also composed for many productions at Hampstead Theatre Club, The Liverpool Everyman,Bristol Old Vic, the Bush Theatre, and Young Vic.

=== Television ===
Slater has appeared in several TV series, including Heartbeat, Inspector Morse, Hotel Babylon, Monarch of the Glen, and as Inspector Kite in The Bill. He also appeared in Birds of a Feather, the Doctor Who story "Terror of the Vervoids", Lovejoy, and Where the Heart Is.

=== Theatre ===
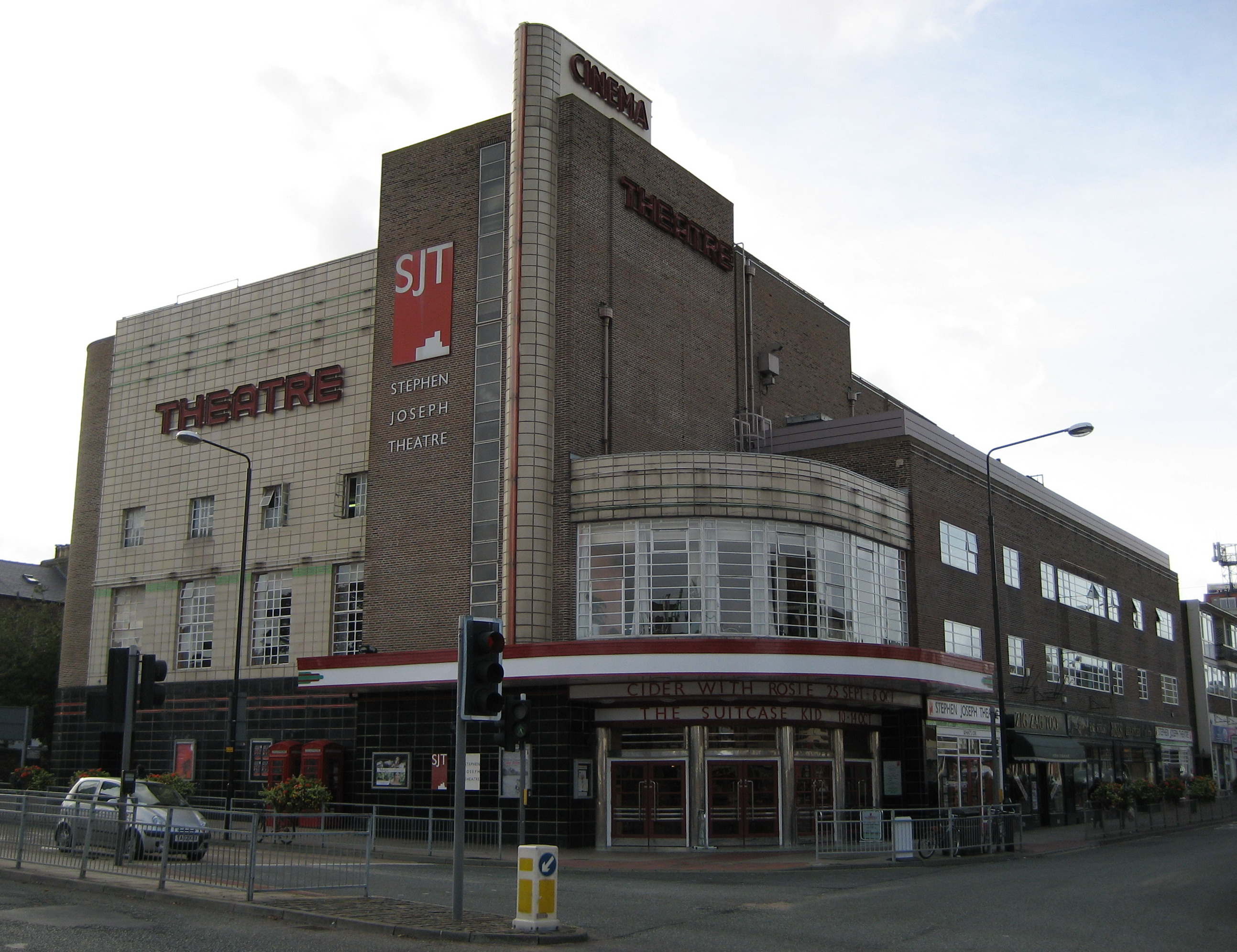
The Stephen Joseph Theatre in Scarborough

At the Stephen Joseph Theatre he was invited to compose the music for four actor-musicians in the Christmas adaptation of Pinocchio in which they play an array of instruments covering 30 roles. The production ended in 2016. Other Christmas shows he directed music for at the SJT include A Christmas Carol and Alice in Wonderland.

Slater also wrote or co-wrote the songs for Christmas shows Cinderella at Theatre Royal, Winchester, The Santa Trap for The Cliffs Pavilion, Southend, and Little Red Riding Hood at the Chelsea Theatre.

His work as a theatrical actor includes a five-year run in the musical Mamma Mia! as Sam Charmichael, as well as Forbidden Broadway (Fortune), Sugar Hill Blues (Hampstead and Warehouse Croydon), The Great White Hope (Tricycle), Aspects of Love (Sydmonton Festival), Waiting for Godot, and The Wind in the Willows (Nuffield Southampton). He appeared in the Theatre Royal (Winchester) production of Peter Pan the Pantomime playing Captain Hook during the Christmas season of 2010/2011. He also wrote all the music for the show.

In 2016 he was musical director for Amadeus at the Royal National Theatre.

=== Music ===
He plays piano, double bass, saxophones, clarinet, guitar, piano accordion, ukulele, and mandolin.

He has written the musical score to the aerial show, 'Zoetrope' which is being produced by the theatre company Kinematic Theatre. The show debuts at Rose Bruford College's Rose theatre in late September. Simon has also written music for the Royal Shakespeare company and other London Theatres, including work at Sloane Square Theatre, The Royal Court.

=== Film ===
In the film The Iron Lady, Slater played the role of Chris Patten.

=== Audio ===
In 2010, Slater's narration of Wolf Hall by Hilary Mantel won an Audie Award for Literary Fiction. and an AudioFile magazine Earphone Award.

In 2018, he read Hans Rosling's Factfulness: Ten Reasons We're Wrong About the World – and Why Things Are Better Than You Think.

== Filmography ==
=== Film ===
Year	Title	Role	Notes
1989	Dealers	Eamonn Doyle	
1999	Entrapment	Paul	
2011	The Iron Lady	Chris Patten	

=== Television ===
Year	Title	Role	Notes
1987	The Bill	Inspector Kite	12 episodes
1988-2013	Casualty	Various	4 Episodes
1996-98	Out of Sight	Mr. Thomas	9 episodes
2000-01	Monarch of the Glen	Fleming	3 episodes
2021-22	Holby City	Russell Faber	19 episodes

=== Stage ===
Year	Production	Character/contribution	Director	Company	Notes and references
2012	Constellations	Music composer		Royal Court, Duke of York's Theatre	Premiered at the Royal Court in 2012 before transferring to the Duke of York's Theatre. Slater received an Olivier Award nomination for his music.
	Great Expectations			Vaudeville Theatre	
	Cannibals			Royal Exchange in Manchester	
	The lady and the van			Hull Truck Theatre	
	Death of a salesman			West Yorkshire Playhouse	
	The Life of Stuff				
	No naughty Bits, Enlightenment			Hampstead Theatre	
2014	Bloodshot	Derek	Douglas Post	St James's Theatre	A one-man thriller.
2015	Carmen Disruption		Michael Longhurst	Almeida Theatre	
2016	Amadeus		National Theatre		
					King Lear and Romeo and Juliet directed by Neil Bartlett, which had a sell-out national tour and season at Stratford.

=== Radio ===
Year	Title	Comments	References
	The Report	A documentary series on BBC Radio 4	
	8 Days in July	Directed by Hugh Levinson for the BBC and based on the 2005 bombings in London	
	The Blood Libel	Directed by Hugh Levinson for the BBC	

== Awards and nominations ==
Year	Organisation	Award	Nominated work	Result
2010		AudioFile magazine Earphone Award; Audie Award for narration	Wolf Hall	Won
2013		Olivier Award for best sound design	Constellations	Nominated
		Offie for best sound design.	The Life of Stuff	Nominated
		Manchester Evening News Awards	James and the Giant Peach	Won
