= David Ames (actor) =

British actor

- Born: 10 August 1983 (age 42)
- Occupation: Actor
- Years active: 2008–present
- Known for: Holby City

David Albert Ames (born 10 August 1983) is an English actor, best known for his portrayal of Dominic Copeland in the medical drama Holby City. In 2023, he joined the cast of the Channel 4 soap opera Hollyoaks.

== Early life and career ==
David Albert Ames was born on 10 August 1983. Before getting a degree in drama, Ames was involved in plays at college. He appeared in the play The Temperamentals as Rudi Geinrich at Greenwich Theatre. So So Gay called his performance in the play "touching". In 2013, Ames joined the cast of Holby City as Dominic Copeland, where he remained in the role until 2022.

In 2022, Ames starred as Steven in the play Steve, which was performed at the Seven Dials Playhouse. Ames starred as Tim / Butterfly in Horse-Play at the Riverside Studios in London between August and September 2022.

In 2023, Ames appeared in the Channel 5 drama The Madame Blanc Mysteries. He also appeared in an episode of the BBC soap opera Doctors as Marcus Bavidge. In June 2023, he was announced to be joining the cast of the Channel 4 soap opera Hollyoaks as the headmaster of Hollyoaks High.

== Personal life ==
Ames is openly gay. Prior to becoming an actor, he lived with his family in Hampshire.

== Filmography ==
Year	Title	Role	Notes
2008	He Kills Coppers	Young Man	TV movie
2009	Doctor Who	Nathan	Episode: "Planet of the Dead"
2011	Doctor Who: The Adventure Games	Thomas Percy	Voice; video game: "The Gunpowder Plot"
2012	The Telemachy	Jay	
2013–22	Holby City	Dominic Copeland	Regular role
2023	The Madame Blanc Mysteries	George	Episode: "#2.5"
2023	Doctors	Marcus Bavidge	Episode: "Anything But Magnolia"
2023–24	Hollyoaks	Carter Shepherd	Regular role

== Theatre ==
- 2022 - Steve - as Steven - at the Seven Dials Playhouse
- 2022 - Horse-Play - as Tim / Butterfly - at the Riverside Studios
