= Dawn Steele =

Scottish actress (born 1975)

- Born: 11 December 1975 (age 50); Glasgow, Scotland
- Education: Royal Conservatoire of Scotland
- Occupation: Actress
- Years active: 1999–present

Dawn Steele (born 11 December 1975) is a Scottish actress. She is best known for her portrayals of Lexie MacDonald from the BBC drama Monarch of the Glen, Alice Trevanion in the ITV drama series Wild at Heart and Dr. Annie Jandhu/Murdoch in BBC Soap Opera River City. Steele played Ange Godard in BBC's Holby City until it ended in March 2022.

== Early life and education ==
Dawn Steele was born in Glasgow and moved to Milton of Campsie in 1982, attended Kilsyth Academy from around 1987–1993 and studied at the Royal Scottish Academy of Music and Drama (RSAMD) in Glasgow from 1994 to 1998, supporting her early career as a waitress in the Rogano Restaurant. She graduated with first class honours in July 1998, and was the winner of the silver medal at the RSAMD in 1998.

== Career ==
Steele's most notable role was as Lexie MacDonald in seasons one through six in the BBC drama Monarch of the Glen, between 2000 and 2004. In January 2005, she appeared as new character Justine McManus in the second season of the BBC's paranormal drama show Sea of Souls with Iain Robertson and Bill Paterson. Before she teamed up with Iain Robertson to work on Sea of Souls they had previously worked together on The Slab Boys and The Debt Collector. Shortly after, she appeared as a student on the BBC reality show Fame Academy in a second all-celebrity series in aid of the charity Comic Relief Does Fame Academy.

In January 2006, Steele returned in the third season of Sea of Souls. In April 2007 she played Shazza in Simon Farquhar's drama Rainbow Kiss at the Royal Court Theatre in London's West End. Reviews praised her performance as a promiscuous beautician who becomes the object of a lethal obsession. In 2002 Steele was voted the Most Eligible Woman in Scotland and followed this up in 2003 when she was voted the second most eligible woman in Scotland by readers of a Sunday newspaper.

Steele starred in a one-off BBC One comedy, Magnolia, which aired on 22 September 2006. In November 2007 she made her pantomime debut as the Wicked Witch Carrion in Sleeping Beauty at the King's Theatre, Glasgow. In 2009 she returned to TV screens in the fourth season of ITV's Wild at Heart, playing a new character, Alice Collins, as the replacement for Amanda Holden who left the show after the third season.

In the summer of 2009, she guest presented STV's daily lifestyle show The Hour for a week, alongside main anchor Stephen Jardine.

In 2010, she returned once more as Alice for a 10-episode run in the fifth season of the show Wild at Heart. She returned again for another 10-episode run in the sixth season of Wild at Heart but as Alice Trevanion; Alice and Danny got engaged at the end of season five. There will be no eighth season, but Steele returned for the last ever episode, a two-hour special, which was shown on 30 December 2012.

In 2011, Agatha Christie Theatre Company's national tour of the 1958 play Verdict starred Steele playing the part of Lisa Koletzky. In May 2012 she returned to the stage for the UK tour of Noël Coward's Volcano as Melissa Littleton and which transferred to the West End in August.

Steele appeared in the BBC Crime Drama Case Histories which aired in June 2013, playing the part of Charlotte McGill.

In 2014 she appeared in the stage show of the Peter James novel The Perfect Murder.

In October 2015 Steele joined the cast of the BBC1 Scotland Drama River City playing Dr. Annie Jandhu. Steele left River City in 2018 stating that the commute from her home in Kent had become too much.

On 19 September 2018, it was announced that Steele had joined the cast of BBC medical drama Holby City in the role of consultant general surgeon Ange Godard. She made her first appearance in the show's twenty-first series, broadcast in January 2019.

== Filmography ==
Year	Title	Role	Notes
1999	Highlander: The Raven	Brynn	Episode 21: "War and Peace"
1999	Haywire	Multiple roles	
1999	The Debt Collector	Barmaid	
1999	Split Second	Kathy Kennedy	
1999	Gregory's Two Girls	Jan	
2000–2004	Monarch of the Glen	Lexie MacDonald	Series regular; also credited as Lexie McTavish
2000	Tinsel Town	Teresa Mullen	Series regular
2001	Tabloid	Tori	
2002	Club Le Monde	Jacqui	Independent film
2002	Snoddy	Laura Bonney	Four episodes
2003	The Key	Mary	Three episodes
2005−2006	Sea of Souls	Justine McManus	Series regular
2006	Magnolia	Sheila	Television movie
2007	Surveillance	Amy Conroy	
2007	True Dare Kiss	Tanya	Two episodes
2009−2012	Wild at Heart	Alice Collins	Series regular; also credited as Alice Trevanion
2013	Case Histories	Charlotte McGill	Two episodes
2015	The Treehouse	Mum	Short film
2015−2018	River City	Annie Jandhu	Series regular; also credited as Annie Murdoch
2017, 2020	Liar	Catherine McAulay	Two episodes
2019−2022	Holby City	Ange Godard	Series regular
2019	Marionette	Tina	Television movie
2022−2026	Granite Harbour	Cora Macmillan	BBC TV drama series
2023	Shetland	Stella Quinn	BBC TV drama series 8 character
2026	EastEnders	Sandra Goodwin	BBC Soap Opera
TBA	Rhona Who Lives by the River	Elspeth	Upcoming series

== Theatre ==
Production	Character	Director	Company
The Perfect Murder	Joan Smiley	Ian Talbot	
Volcano	Melissa Littleton	Roy Marsden	Thelma Holt & Bill Kenwright
Verdict	Lisa Koletsky	Joe Harmston	Bill Kenwright Ltd
Blackbird	Una	David Grindley	MJE Productions
Tutti Frutti	Suzi Kettles	Tony Cownie	National Theatre of Scotland
HOME Edinburgh		Anthony Neilson	National Theatre of Scotland
The Slab Boys	Bernadette	Philip Howard	Traverse, Edinburgh
Electra	Crysothemis		Theatre Babel
Medea	Glauke		Theatre Babel
Rainbow Kiss	Shazza	Richard Wilson	Royal Court Theatre
