= List of Holby City episodes (series 13–23) =

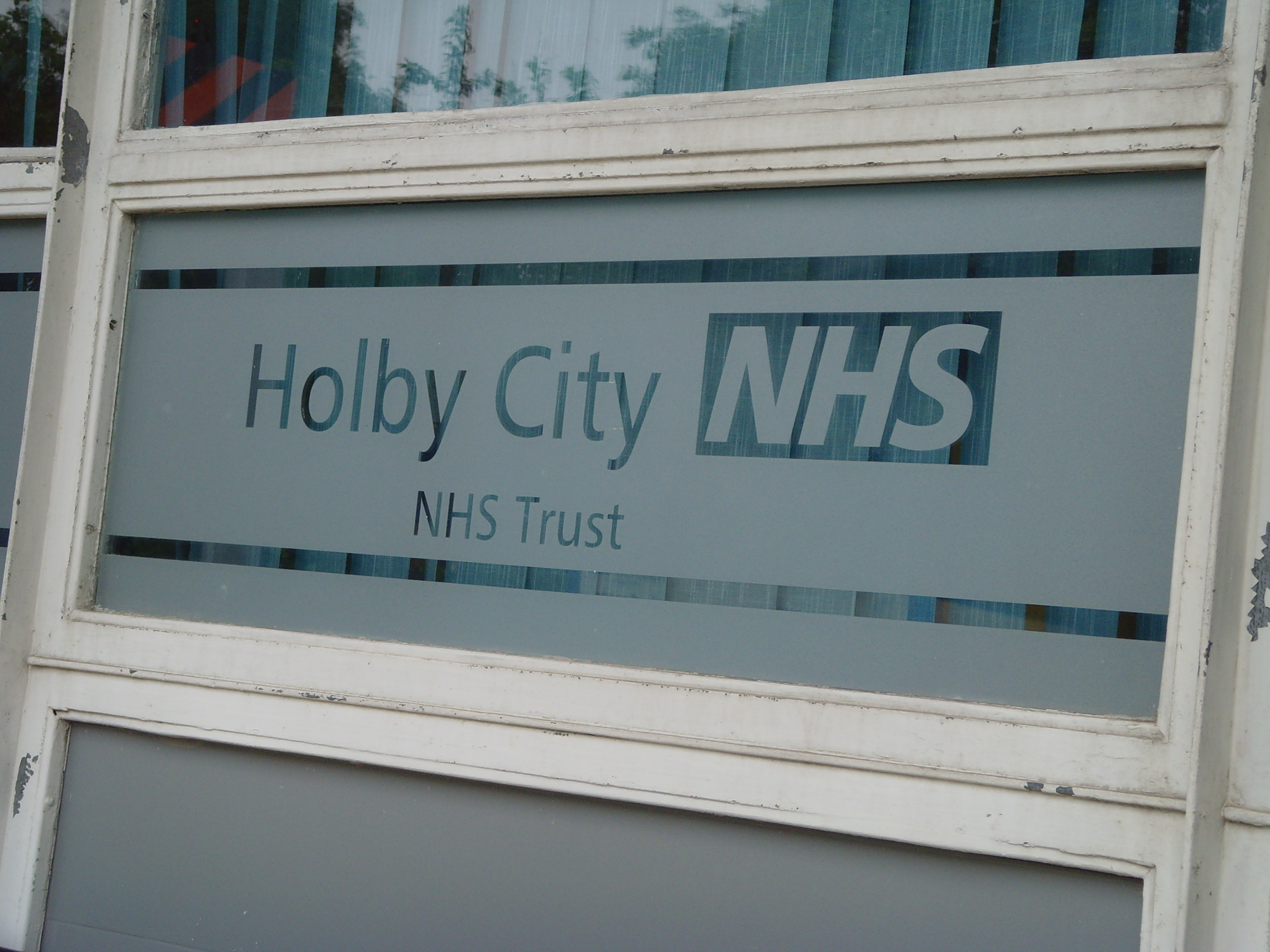
The set of Holby City, located at the BBC Elstree Centre in Borehamwood.

Holby City is a British medical drama television series that was broadcast on BBC One in the United Kingdom between 12 January 1999 and 29 March 2022. The series was created by Tony McHale and Mal Young as a spin-off from the BBC medical drama Casualty, which is set in the emergency department of the Holby City Hospital, based in the fictitious town of Holby. The show focuses on the lives, both professional and personal, of the medical and ancillary staff on the hospital's surgical wards. It is primarily filmed at the BBC Elstree Centre in Borehamwood. Young wanted to explore what happened to patients treated in Casualty once they were taken away to the hospital's surgical wards. He opined that Casualty limited itself to "accident of the week" storylines, while Holby City allowed the possibility of storylines about long-term care, rather than immediate life-and-death decisions. A police procedural spin-off, HolbyBlue, began airing from 8 May 2007, running for two series before being cancelled due to poor viewing figures. The spin-off features a crossover with Holby City in its second series.

The show has aired twenty-three full series. The drama reached its 1000th episode on 5 November 2019, and was cancelled in June 2021. The first series of Holby City ran for nine episodes, which was increased to sixteen and thirty episodes for the second and third series, respectively. Subsequent series contain fifty-two episodes and were broadcast on a weekly basis. Young associated the rise of episodes with the show's success. Some series have additional episodes: series ten and twenty-one contain fifty-three episodes, series twelve contains fifty-five episodes, and series nineteen contains sixty-four episodes, due to internal BBC reasons. Series twenty-two contains a reduced forty-four episodes following a four-month production break due to the COVID-19 pandemic. The following series was also reduced to fifty episodes.

For the first series, episodes were 50 minutes in length. Since then, episodes have mostly been approximately an hour in length. Episode lengths were temporarily reduced to 40 minutes midway through series 22 as a result of the COVID-19 pandemic. The show was originally broadcast on Tuesday nights in the 8.10 pm, before moving to Thursday nights in the 8pm timeslot from the second series. Midway through series three, broadcast reverted to Tuesday nights, now in the 8.05 pm timeslot. It was later moved to an 8pm timeslot from the fourth series. Holby City temporarily returned to the Thursday night timeslot for two months during series nine, allowing HolbyBlue to air in its usual timeslot. As a consequence of episodes being reduced to 40 minutes, the serial was moved to a 7.50 pm timeslot.

== Series overview ==
Series	Episodes	Originally released		Average viewership (in millions)
Series	Episodes	First released	Last released	Average viewership (in millions)
1	9	12 January 1999	9 March 1999	9.32
2	16	25 November 1999	9 March 2000	8.36
3	30	5 October 2000	5 June 2001	7.74 (Note: One rating is unknown due to it being outside of the top 30 ratings for that respective week.)
4	52	9 October 2001	1 October 2002	7.52
5	52	8 October 2002	30 September 2003	7.76
6	52	7 October 2003	12 October 2004	7.68
7	52	19 October 2004	11 October 2005	7.04
8	52	18 October 2005	17 October 2006	6.44
9	52	24 October 2006	9 October 2007	5.87
10	53	16 October 2007	14 October 2008	5.62
11	52	21 October 2008	13 October 2009	5.44
12	55	20 October 2009	12 October 2010	5.62
13	52	19 October 2010	11 October 2011	5.65
14	52	18 October 2011	9 October 2012	4.91
15	52	16 October 2012	8 October 2013	4.62 (Note: Two ratings are unknown due to them being outside of the top 30 ratings for their respective weeks.)
16	52	15 October 2013	7 October 2014	4.30
17	52	14 October 2014	6 October 2015	4.57
18	52	13 October 2015	4 October 2016	4.53
19	64	11 October 2016	19 December 2017	4.54
20	52	2 January 2018	27 December 2018	4.05 (Note: Two ratings are unknown due to them being outside of the top 30 ratings for their respective weeks, and fifteen ratings are unknown due to them being outside of the top 15 ratings for their respective weeks.)
21	53	2 January 2019	31 December 2019	4.29 (Note: Fifty-one ratings are unknown due to them being outside of the top 15 ratings for their respective weeks.)
22	44	7 January 2020	30 March 2021	TBA
23	50	6 April 2021	29 March 2022	TBA

== Episodes ==
=== Series 13 (2010–2011) ===
No. overall	No. in series	Title	Directed by	Written by	Original release date	Viewers (millions)
528	1	"Shifts"	Sarah O'Gorman	Justin Young	19 October 2010	6.06
529	2	"The Short Straw"	Sarah O'Gorman	David Lawrence	26 October 2010	5.88
530	3	"Tough, Love"	Sean Glynn	Martha Hillier	2 November 2010	5.93
531	4	"Queen's Gambit"	Sean Glynn	Philip Gawthorne	9 November 2010	6.00
532	5	"My No. 1 Fan"	Rob Evans	Rebecca Wojciechowski	16 November 2010	5.95
533	6	"Betrayal"	Rob Evans	Lauren Klee	23 November 2010	5.88
534	7	"Future Shock"	Paul Gibson	Graham Mitchell	30 November 2010	6.17
535	8	"Losing Game"	Paul Gibson	Shazia Rashid	7 December 2010	4.31
536	9	"The Lying Kind"	Jamie Annett	Nicola Wilson	14 December 2010	5.82
537	10	"The Most Wonderful Time of the Year"	Jamie Annett	Tony McHale	21 December 2010	6.24
538	11	"Snow Queens"	Daikin Marsh	Martha Hillier	28 December 2010	6.67
539	12	"Running the Gauntlet"	David Innes Edwards	Chris Murray	4 January 2011	6.45
540	13	"China in Your Hands"	David Innes Edwards	Martha Hillier	11 January 2011	6.48
541	14	"My Hero"	Michael Keillor	Rob Williams	18 January 2011	6.56
542	15	"Don't Go Changing"	Michael Keillor	Nick Fisher	25 January 2011	6.06
543	16	"Love Thy Neighbour"	Dermot Boyd	Patrick Homes	1 February 2011	6.07
544	17	"Anger Management"	Dermot Boyd	Patrick Homes	8 February 2011	6.27
545	18	"Blue Valentine"	Fraser MacDonald	Justin Young	15 February 2011	5.89
546	19	"Open Your Heart"	Fraser MacDonald	Nick Fisher	22 February 2011	6.07
547	20	"No Credit, No Blame"	Jamie Annett	Mark Cairns	1 March 2011	6.02
548	21	"What You Mean By Home"	Jamie Annett	Nick Warburton	8 March 2011	6.11
549	22	"Too Much Monkey Business"	Reza Moradi	Tony McHale	15 March 2011	5.79
550	23	"Clash of the Titans"	Reza Moradi	Graham Mitchell	22 March 2011	5.90
551	24	"Second Coming"	David Innes Edwards	Joe Ainsworth	29 March 2011	5.49
552	25	"Coming Second"	David Innes Edwards	Joe Ainsworth	5 April 2011	5.75
553	26	"Boy Valentine, Girl Valentine"	Daikin Marsh	Dana Fainaru	12 April 2011	5.72
554	27	"Rebound"	Daikin Marsh	Martha Hillier	19 April 2011	5.72
555	28	"Crossing The Line"	Fraser MacDonald	Daniella James	26 April 2011	5.63
556	29	"Tunnel Vision"	Fraser MacDonald	Andrew Holden	3 May 2011	5.81
557	30	"My Bad"	Edward Bazalgette	Tahsin Güner	10 May 2011	5.76
558	31	"Step On Up"	Edward Bazalgette	Gillian Richmond	17 May 2011	5.68
559	32	"A Greater Good"	Rob Evans	Rob Williams	24 May 2011	5.31
560	33	"Damage Control"	Rob Evans	Tahsin Güner	31 May 2011	4.26
561	34	"Rescue Me"	Dermot Boyd	Kim Revill	7 June 2011	5.46
562	35	"All About Me"	Dermot Boyd	Nick Fisher	14 June 2011	5.33
563	36	"In Between Days"	Daikin Marsh	Justin Young	21 June 2011	5.35
564	37	"The Bottom Line"	Sean Glynn	Stuart Morris	28 June 2011	5.41
565	38	"Out on a Limb"	Sean Glynn	Lauren Klee	5 July 2011	5.24
566	39	"Hand In Glove"	Jamie Annett	Sasha Hails & Nick Fisher	12 July 2011	5.37
567	40	"Going It Alone"	Jamie Annett	Rebecca Wojciechowski	19 July 2011	5.59
568	41	"Sirens"	Rob Evans	Patrick Homes	26 July 2011	5.16
569	42	"Old Habits"	Rob Evans	Fiona Peek	2 August 2011	5.36
570	43	"Walk the Line"	Edward Bazalgette	Dana Fainaru	9 August 2011	5.30
571	44	"One of Those Days"	Edward Bazalgette	Emma Goodwin & Patrick Homes	16 August 2011	5.15
572	45	"All Good Things"	Dermot Boyd	Tahsin Güner	23 August 2011	5.30
573	46	"Big Lies, Little Lies"	Dermot Boyd	Peter McKenna	30 August 2011	5.26
574	47	"Who Needs Enemies"	David Innes Edwards	Justin Young	6 September 2011	4.78
575	48	"Night Cover"	David Innes Edwards	David Young	13 September 2011	4.98
576	49	"Broken"	Jennie Darnell	Patrick Homes	20 September 2011	5.31
577	50	"Everything to Play For"	Jennie Darnell	Nick Fisher	27 September 2011	5.04
578	51	"Oliver Twists"	John Yorke	Joe Ainsworth	4 October 2011	5.42
579	52	"PS Elliot"	Daikin Marsh	Joe Ainsworth	11 October 2011	5.12

=== Series 14 (2011–2012) ===
No. overall	No. in series	Title	Directed by	Written by	Original release date	Viewers (millions)
580	1	"Keep on Keeping On"	Rob Evans	Gillian Richmond	18 October 2011	5.48
581	2	"Culture Shock"	Rob Evans	Rebecca Wojciechowski	25 October 2011	5.73
582	3	"Shame"	Matt Carter	Graham Mitchell	1 November 2011	5.69
583	4	"Under the Skin"	Matt Carter	Rob Williams	8 November 2011	5.63
584	5	"Devil in the Detail"	Paul Gibson	Marc Pye & Martha Hillier	15 November 2011	5.12
585	6	"No Shortcuts"	Paul Gibson	Stuart Morris	22 November 2011	5.51
586	7	"See You on the Ice"	David Innes Edwards	Dana Fainaru	29 November 2011	4.74
587	8	"The Hand That Bites"	David Innes Edwards	Lauren Klee	6 December 2011	5.41
588	9	"Personal Injury"	Clive Arnold	Tahsin Güner	13 December 2011	5.55
589	10	"Half Empty"	Clive Arnold	Andrew Holden	20 December 2011	4.96
590	11	"Wise Men"	Rob Evans	Justin Young	27 December 2011	5.93
591	12	"When the Hangover Strikes"	Jamie Annett	Joe Ainsworth	3 January 2012	5.47
592	13	"Hide Your Love Away"	Jamie Annett	Rebecca Wojciechowski	10 January 2012	5.23
593	14	"She's Electric"	Sean Glynn	Martha Hillier	17 January 2012	5.38
594	15	"Butterflies"	Sean Glynn	Paul Matthew Thompson	24 January 2012	5.07
595	16	"Here and Now"	David Innes Edwards	Matthew Bardsley	31 January 2012	5.24
596	17	"The Best Man"	David Innes Edwards	Martha Hillier	7 February 2012	5.57
597	18	"Awarded"	John Howlett	Matthew Barry	14 February 2012	5.37
598	19	"What You Wish For"	John Howlett	Philip Ralph	21 February 2012	4.65
599	20	"Fight the Good Fight"	Matt Carter	Justin Young & Paul Matthew Thompson	28 February 2012	5.61
600	21	"Fresh Blood"	Matt Carter	Rob Kinsman	5 March 2012	4.95
601	22	"The Ties That Bind"	Clare Holman	Graham Mitchell	13 March 2012	5.00
602	23	"Eastern Promise"	Clare Holman	Joe Ainsworth	20 March 2012	5.05
603	24	"Got No Strings"	Daikin Marsh	Nick Fisher	27 March 2012	4.52
604	25	"Throw In The Towel"	Daikin Marsh	Sean Cook	3 April 2012	4.87
605	26	"Equilibrium"	Reza Moradi	Patrick Homes	10 April 2012	5.05
606	27	"Ribbons"	Reza Moradi	Martha Hillier	17 April 2012	5.01
607	28	"Half A Person"	Jamie Annett	Matthew Broughton	24 April 2012	5.13
608	29	"Coercion"	Jamie Annett	Martha Hillier	1 May 2012	4.92
609	30	"A Woman's Work"	Sean Glynn	Justin Young	8 May 2012	3.92
610	31	"Wolf's Clothing"	Sean Glynn	Lauren Klee	15 May 2012	5.02
611	32	"Double Bubble"	David Innes Edwards	Martha Hillier & Paul Campbell	22 May 2012	4.64
612	33	"Kids' Stuff"	David Innes Edwards	Joe Ainsworth	29 May 2012	4.68
613	34	"Last Day on Earth"	Daikin Marsh	Tahsin Güner	5 June 2012	4.89
614	35	"Unsafe Haven (Part 1 of 2)"	Simon Meyers	Patrick Homes	12 June 2012	4.46
615	36	"Unsafe Haven (Part 2 of 2)"	Simon Meyers	Dana Fainaru	19 June 2012	3.34
616	37	"Long Way Down"	Simon Massey	Stephen Brady	26 June 2012	4.86
617	38	"Stepping Up To The Plate"	Simon Massey	Julia Gilbert	3 July 2012	4.78
618	39	"Only You"	John Howlett	Graham Mitchell	10 July 2012	4.81
619	40	"Last Man Standing"	John Howlett	Rebecca Wojciechowski	17 July 2012	4.62
620	41	"From Here To Maternity"	Jamie Annett	Martha Hillier	24 July 2012	4.67
621	42	"Breathless"	Jamie Annett	Kirstie Swain	31 July 2012	3.62
622	43	"Crime and Misdemeanours"	Julie Edwards	Steph Lloyd-Jones	7 August 2012	3.21
623	44	"You and Me"	Julie Edwards	Peter McKenna	14 August 2012	4.62
624	45	"The Devil Will Come"	Matt Carter	Fiona Peek	21 August 2012	4.90
625	46	"Taxi For Spence"	Matt Carter	Joe Ainsworth	28 August 2012	4.66
626	47	"I'm Sticking With You"	Richard Signy	Dana Fainaru	4 September 2012	4.51
627	48	"Devil's Dance"	Richard Signy	Martha Hillier	11 September 2012	4.57
628	49	"A Crack in the Ice"	Audrey Cooke	Lauren Klee	18 September 2012	4.38
629	50	"Hold on Me"	Audrey Cooke	Martin Jameson	25 September 2012	4.60
630	51	"Blood Money"	Paul Harrison	Nick Fisher	2 October 2012	4.93
631	52	"When Sacha Met Chrissie"	Paul Harrison	Justin Young	9 October 2012	4.97

=== Series 15 (2012–2013) ===
No. overall	No. in series	Title	Directed by	Written by	Original release date	Viewers (millions)
632	1	"The Third Way"	Robert Del Maestro	Martha Hillier, Dana Fainaru & Julia Gilbert	16 October 2012	4.80
633	2	"Chasing Demons"	Robert Del Maestro	Julia Gilbert	23 October 2012	4.74
634	3	"Follow My Leader"	Lee Salisbury	Stephen Brady & Nick Fisher	30 October 2012	4.47
635	4	"If Not for You"	Lee Salisbury	Jamie Crichton	6 November 2012	4.65
636	5	"To Absent Friends"	Neasa Hardiman	Philip Ralph	13 November 2012	4.83
637	6	"Hail Caesar"	Neasa Hardiman	Dana Fainaru	20 November 2012	4.84
638	7	"After the Party"	David Tucker	Emer Kenny	27 November 2012	4.76
639	8	"How Lo Can You Go"	David Tucker	Joe Ainsworth	4 December 2012	4.97
640	9	"Fault Lines"	Paul Gibson	Nick Fisher	11 December 2012	5.00
641	10	"Through The Darkness"	Paul Gibson	Martha Hillier & Dana Fainaru	18 December 2012	5.02
642	11	"And We Banish Shade"	Richard Platt	Martha Hillier	28 December 2012	4.74
643	12	"Blood Ties"	Richard Platt	Christian O' Reilly	2 January 2013	4.40
644	13	"Hanssen/Hemingway"	Rob Evans	Justin Young	8 January 2013	5.11
645	14	"Push the Button (Part 1 of 2)"	Matt Carter	Kirstie Swain	15 January 2013	5.15
646	15	"Push the Button (Part 2 of 2)"	Matt Carter	Julia Gilbert	22 January 2013	5.02
647	16	"The Waiting Game"	Ben Gutteridge	Matthew Barry	29 January 2013	5.05
648	17	"Spence's Choice (Part 1 of 2)"	Ben Gutteridge	Tahsin Güner	5 February 2013	4.89
649	18	"Spence's Choice (Part 2 of 2)"	Nigel Douglas	Martin Jameson	12 February 2013	5.20
650	19	"Ask Me No Questions"	Nigel Douglas	Jamie Crichton	19 February 2013	5.08
651	20	"Unravelled"	Jamie Annett	Frank Rickarby	26 February 2013	4.95
652	21	"Recovery Position"	Jamie Annett	Nick Fisher	5 March 2013	4.30 (Note: Not reported in the weekly top 30 programmes for BBC One, so an overnight viewing figure is provided instead.)
653	22	"Not Aaron"	David Innes Edwards	Dana Fainaru	12 March 2013	4.70
654	23	"Holbys Got Torment"	David Innes Edwards	Joe Ainsworth	19 March 2013	4.75
655	24	"Journey's End"	Neasa Hardiman	Patrick Homes	26 March 2013	4.66
656	25	"The End of The Beginning"	Neasa Hardiman	Matthew Broughton	2 April 2013	4.77
657	26	"Promises, Promises"	Richard Signy	Nick Fisher & Dana Fainaru	9 April 2013	4.99
658	27	"Great Expectations"	Richard Signy	Martha Hillier	16 April 2013	4.68
659	28	"Second Life"	Rob Evans	Paul Matthew Thompson	23 April 2013	4.56
660	29	"Time Has Told Me"	Rob Evans	Ian Kershaw	30 April 2013	4.38
661	30	"Only Human"	David Tucker	Rebecca Wojciechowski	7 May 2013	4.64
662	31	"The More Deceived"	David Tucker	Joe Ainsworth	14 May 2013	4.47
663	32	"Divided We Fall"	Lisa Clarke	Justin Young	21 May 2013	4.64
664	33	"Back From The Dead"	Lisa Clarke	Jon Sen	28 May 2013	3.65
665	34	"Home"	Rob Evans	Nick Fisher	4 June 2013	4.14
666	35	"All Tomorrow's Parties"	Jamie Annett	Graham Mitchell	11 June 2013	4.44
667	36	"Follow the Yellow Brick Road"	Jamie Annett	Johanne McAndrew & Elliott Hope	18 June 2013	4.26
668	37	"Break"	Graeme Harper	Nick Fisher	25 June 2013	4.28
669	38	"The Journey Home"	Graeme Harper	Julia Gilbert	2 July 2013	4.31
670	39	"Mens Sana In Corpore Sano"	John Maidens	Patrick Homes	9 July 2013	4.27
671	40	"Make or Break"	John Maidens	Rob Kinsman	16 July 2013	4.11
672	41	"A Night's Tale"	Pip Short	Dana Fainaru	23 July 2013	4.60
673	42	"Never Let Me Go"	Pip Short	Julia Gilbert	30 July 2013	4.67
674	43	"Digby Dog"	Richard Platt	Martha Hillier	6 August 2013	4.43
675	44	"Old Wounds"	Richard Platt	Patrick Homes	13 August 2013	4.67
676	45	"All At Sea"	Alan Wareing	Laura Poliakoff	20 August 2013	4.30
677	46	"Good Day for Bad News"	Alan Wareing	Johanne McAndrew & Elliott Hope	27 August 2013	4.21
678	47	"Point of Impact"	Nigel Douglas	Lucia Haynes	3 September 2013	4.63
679	48	"The Kick Inside"	Nigel Douglas	Joe Ainsworth	10 September 2013	3.95
680	49	"Contra Mundum"	Henry Mason	Patrick Wilde	17 September 2013	4.52
681	50	"Fredrik"	Henry Mason	Julia Gilbert	24 September 2013	4.41
682	51	"The Cost of Loving"	Richard Signy	Kim Revill	1 October 2013	4.53
683	52	"Like a Prayer"	Richard Signy	Nick Fisher	8 October 2013	4.21

=== Series 16 (2013–2014) ===
No. overall	No. in series	Title	Directed by	Written by	Original release date	Viewers (millions)
684	1	"If I Needed Someone"	Graeme Harper	David Bowker	15 October 2013	4.04
685	2	"Friends Like You"	Graeme Harper	Helen Jenkins	22 October 2013	4.11
686	3	"Flesh is Weak"	James Larkin	Catherine Johnson	29 October 2013	4.92
687	4	"Last Dance"	James Larkin	Simon Booker	5 November 2013	4.64
688	5	"'Arthur's Theme'"	David Innes Edwards	Dana Fainaru	12 November 2013	5.12
689	6	"Merry-Go-Round"	David Innes Edwards	Patrick Homes	19 November 2013	4.79
690	7	"Sink or Swim"	Tim Mercier	Jon Sen	26 November 2013	4.94
691	8	"Fait Accompli"	Tim Mercier	Johanne McAndrew and Elliot Hope	3 December 2013	3.46
692	9	"Heart of Hope"	Jamie Annett	Mark Stevenson	10 December 2013	4.47
693	10	"Father's Day"	Jamie Annett	Joe Ainsworth	17 December 2013	4.31
694	11	"All I Want for Christmas Is You"	Jon Sen	Julia Gilbert	24 December 2013	4.55
695	12	"Ring in the New"	Jon Sen	Julia Gilbert	31 December 2013	3.75
696	13	"Self Control"	Julie Edwards	Rebecca Wojciechowski	7 January 2014	5.04
697	14	"Intuition"	Jennie Darnell	Lucia Haynes	14 January 2014	4.76
698	15	"Life After Life"	Jennie Darnell	Katie Douglas	21 January 2014	5.13
699	16	"Prince Among Men"	Amy Neil	Nick Fisher	28 January 2014	4.60
700	17	"Things We Lost in the Fire"	Amy Neil	Natalie Mitchell and Julia Gilbert	4 February 2014	4.98
701	18	"Eat Your Heart Out"	Emma Sullivan	Nick Fisher	11 February 2014	4.78
702	19	"Aftertaste"	Emma Sullivan	Kit Lambert	18 February 2014	4.97
703	20	"Anything You Can Do"	Richard Platt	Dana Fainaru	25 February 2014	4.75
704	21	"Instinct"	Richard Platt	Patrick Homes	4 March 2014	4.82
705	22	"Exit Strategy – Part One"	Jan Bauer	Robert Goldsbrough	11 March 2014	4.56
706	23	"Exit Strategy – Part Two"	Jan Bauer	Joe Ainsworth	18 March 2014	4.75
707	24	"Green Ink"	David Tucker	Paul Matthew Thompson	25 March 2014	4.85
708	25	"The Cruellest Month"	David Tucker	Martin Jameson	1 April 2014	4.26
709	26	"The Win"	Graeme Harper	Bede Blake	8 April 2014	4.52
710	27	"Cold Heart, Warm Hands"	Graeme Harper	Nick Fisher	15 April 2014	4.38
711	28	"Battle Lines"	Jo Johnson	Julia Gilbert	22 April 2014	4.88
712	29	"Wild Child"	Jo Johnson	David Bowker (writer)	29 April 2014	4.56
713	30	"My Name Is Joe"	Pip Short	Johanne McAndrew and Elliot Hope	6 May 2014	4.52
714	31	"No Apologies"	Pip Short	Anna McPartlin	13 May 2014	4.69
715	32	"Keeping Mum"	Richard Signy	Joe Ainsworth	22 May 2014	4.27
716	33	"Crush"	Hugh Quarshie	Glen Laker	27 May 2014	3.73
717	34	"Collateral"	Jamie Annett	Dana Fainaru	3 June 2014	4.03
718	35	"Masquerade"	Jamie Annett	Lucia Haynes	10 June 2014	4.00
719	36	"Little Star"	Julie Edwards	Julia Gilbert	19 June 2014	2.31
720	37	"Every Dog Has Its Day"	James Larkin	Nick Fisher	26 June 2014	3.87
721	38	"All Before Them"	James Larkin	Kate Verghese	30 June 2014	3.78
722	39	"Captive"	John Hardwick	Lauren Klee	9 July 2014	3.30
723	40	"'The Spirit...'"	John Hardwick	Chris Lindsay	15 July 2014	3.74
724	41	"A Heart Man"	Jennie Darnell	Rebecca Wojciechowski	22 July 2014	3.75
725	42	"One Small Step"	Jennie Darnell	Alex Child	29 July 2014	3.50
726	43	"Affair of the Mind"	Amy Neil	Johanne McAndrew and Elliot Hope	5 August 2014	3.98
727	44	"Star Crossed Lovers"	Amy Neil	Claire Bennett	12 August 2014	4.04
728	45	"The Art of Losing"	Daniel Wilson	Katie Douglas	19 August 2014	3.89
729	46	"'Going, Going...'"	Daniel Wilson	Joe Ainsworth	26 August 2014	4.18
730	47	"The Looking Glass"	Richard Platt	Kate Verghese	2 September 2014	4.18
731	48	"'Hoops'"	Richard Platt	Fiona Peek	9 September 2014	4.20
732	49	"Forgive Me Father"	Jamie Annett	Nick Fisher	16 September 2014	4.17
733	50	"Mummy Dearest"	Jamie Annett	Nick Fisher, Johanne McAndrew and Elliot Hope	23 September 2014	3.83
734	51	"Inside Out"	Jan Bauer	Anna McPartlin	30 September 2014	4.13
735	52	"True Colours"	Jan Bauer	Jon Sen	7 October 2014	3.69

=== Series 17 (2014–2015) ===
No. overall	No. in series	Title	Directed by	Written by	Original release date	Viewers (millions)
736	1	"'Not Waving But Drowning'"	Griff Rowland	Julia Gilbert	14 October 2014	4.59
737	2	"Bounce Back"	Griff Rowland	Nick Fisher	21 October 2014	4.40
738	3	"The Science of Imaginary Solutions"	Karl Neilson	Robert Goldsbrough	28 October 2014	4.46
739	4	"Chaos in Her Wings"	Karl Neilson	Kate Verghese	4 November 2014	4.49
740	5	"'We Must Remember This'"	Richard Platt	Joe Ainsworth, Elliot Hope and Johanne McAndrew	11 November 2014	4.59
741	6	"Severed"	Richard Platt	Joe Ainsworth	18 November 2014	4.27
742	7	"'Flesh and Blood'"	Daniel Wilson	Jamie Crichton	25 November 2014	4.12
743	8	"I Am What I Am Not"	Daniel Wilson	Chris Lindsay	2 December 2014	3.42
744	9	"Estel"	Jamie Annett	Patrick Homes	9 December 2014	4.23
745	10	"Star of Wonder"	Jamie Annett	Julia Gilbert	16 December 2014	4.43
746	11	"I Will Honour Christmas in My Heart"	Steve Brett	Johanne McAndrew and Elliot Hope	23 December 2014	4.48
747	12	"Should Auld Acquaintance Be Forgot"	Steve Brett	Tony Higgins	30 December 2014	4.78
748	13	"Brand New You"	Nigel Douglas	Rebecca Wojciechowski	6 January 2015	5.08
749	14	"Wages of Sin"	John Hardwick	Johanne McAndrew and Elliot Hope	13 January 2015	5.09
750	15	"Sucker Punch"	John Hardwick	Martin Jameson	20 January 2015	4.79
751	16	"Good Girls Don't Lie"	Karl Neilson	Kit Lambert	27 January 2015	4.90
752	17	"The Beat Goes On"	Karl Neilson	Joe Ainsworth	3 February 2015	4.99
753	18	"Love Divided by Three"	James Larkin	Matthew Broughton	10 February 2015	4.93
754	19	"Be Bold, Be Bold"	James Larkin	Catherine Johnson	17 February 2015	4.98
755	20	"Domino Effect"	Dermot Boyd	Katie Douglas	24 February 2015	4.74
756	21	"Trust in Me"	Dermot Boyd	Jon Sen	3 March 2015	4.94
757	22	"Blindside"	David Innes Edwards	Anna McPartlin	10 March 2015	4.78
758	23	"We Have the Technology"	David Innes Edwards	Nick Fisher	17 March 2015	4.81
759	24	"Rock and a Hard Place"	John Howlett	Johanne McAndrew and Elliot Hope	24 March 2015	5.07
760	25	"The Last Time I Saw You"	John Howlett	Julia Gilbert	31 March 2015	4.50
761	26	"Squeeze the Pips"	Griff Rowland	Nick Fisher	7 April 2015	4.86
762	27	"Go the Distance"	Griff Rowland	Alex Child and Andy Bayliss	14 April 2015	4.70
763	28	"All About Evie"	Paul Murphy	Joe Ainsworth	21 April 2015	4.69
764	29	"Small Disappointments"	Paul Murphy	Patrick Homes	28 April 2015	4.60
765	30	"Homecoming"	Dermot Boyd	Dana Fainaru	5 May 2015	4.62
766	31	"Lifelines"	Dermot Boyd	Fiona Peek	12 May 2015	4.63
767	32	"The Ides of March"	Jermain Julien	Peter Mattessi	19 May 2015	4.58
768	33	"All Coming Back to Me Now"	Jermain Julien	Kate Verghese and Sally Tatchell	26 May 2015	3.01
769	34	"Tug of Love"	Jamie Annett	Patrea Smallacombe	2 June 2015	4.49
770	35	"When a Man Loves a Woman"	Jamie Annett	Nick Fisher	9 June 2015	4.26
771	36	"The Children of Lovers"	Nigel Douglas	Lucia Haynes	16 June 2015	4.40
772	37	"Spiral Staircases"	Nigel Douglas	Andy Bayliss	23 June 2015	4.40
773	38	"Losing Control of the Wheel"	Louise Hooper	Julia Gilbert	30 June 2015	4.11
774	39	"Beneath a Mask"	Louise Hooper	Johanne McAndrew and Elliot Hope	7 July 2015	4.33
775	40	"U-Turn"	Jennie Darnell	Rebecca Wojciechowski	14 July 2015	4.44
776	41	"Family Fortunes"	Jennie Darnell	Joe Ainsworth	21 July 2015	4.38
777	42	"Return to Innocence"	Jan Bauer	Johanne McAndrew and Elliot Hope	28 July 2015	4.41
778	43	"A Good Man"	Jan Bauer	Patrick Homes	4 August 2015	4.31
779	44	"Speak True"	David Tucker	Katie Douglas	11 August 2015	4.45
780	45	"Beautiful"	David Tucker	Julia Gilbert	18 August 2015	4.35
781	46	"Infallible"	Jermain Julien	Kate Verghese	25 August 2015	4.21
782	47	"Man of Conscience"	Jermain Julien	Tony Higgins	1 September 2015	4.81
783	48	"An Eye for an Eye"	Nigel Douglas	Nick Fisher	8 September 2015	4.37
784	49	"Shockwaves"	Nigel Douglas	Dana Fainaru	15 September 2015	4.27
785	50	"At First I Was Afraid"	Julie Edwards	Julia Gilbert	22 September 2015	4.31
786	51	"Cover Story"	Daikin Marsh	Joe Ainsworth	29 September 2015	4.61
787	52	"Ever After"	Daikin Marsh	Johanne McAndrew and Elliot Hope	6 October 2015	4.47

=== Series 18 (2015–2016) ===
No. overall	No. in series	Title	Directed by	Written by	Original release date	Viewers (millions)
788	1	"The Sticky Mess of Being"	Eddy Marshall	Kate Verghese	13 October 2015	4.62
789	2	"Cover Up"	Eddy Marshall	Joe Ainsworth	20 October 2015	4.61
790	3	"Calling Time"	Richard Platt	Nessah Muthy and Julia Gilbert	27 October 2015	4.74
791	4	"What it Takes"	Richard Platt	Michelle Lipton	3 November 2015	4.74
792	5	"Left Behind"	David Innes Edwards	Rebecca Wojciechowski	10 November 2015	4.74
793	6	"Beneath the Cover"	David Innes Edwards	Lindsay Williams	17 November 2015	3.64
794	7	"A Delicate Truth"	Louise Hooper	Katie Douglas	24 November 2015	4.25
795	8	"In Which We Serve"	Louise Hooper	Ed Sellek	1 December 2015	4.35
796	9	"Skin and Blister"	James Larkin	Joe Ainsworth and Kate Verghese	8 December 2015	4.19
797	10	"Bad Blood, Fake Snow"	James Larkin	Nick Fisher	15 December 2015	4.51
798	11	"Blue Christmas"	Karl Neilson	Julia Gilbert	22 December 2015	4.54
799	12	"Beginnings"	Karl Neilson	Andy Bayliss	29 December 2015	4.23
800	13	"Young Hearts, Run Free"	Matthew Evans	Johanne McAndrew and Elliot Hope	5 January 2016	4.82
801	14	"The Hope That Kills"	Jennie Darnell	Patrick Homes	12 January 2016	5.10
802	15	"Sins of Our Fathers"	Jennie Darnell	Kit Lambert	19 January 2016	4.82
803	16	"Kiss and Tell"	Claire Winyard	Jeff Povey	26 January 2016	4.53
804	17	"Serenity"	Claire Winyard	Michelle Lipton	2 February 2016	4.63
805	18	"A Partnership, Literally"	Sue Dunderdale	Andy Bayliss	9 February 2016	4.90
806	19	"All That Glitters"	Sue Dunderdale	Sue Mooney	16 February 2016	4.84
807	20	"All Fall Down"	Dermot Boyd	Patrick Homes	23 February 2016	4.77
808	21	"One Under"	Dermot Boyd	Kate Verghese	1 March 2016	4.85
809	22	"On the Ropes"	Louise Hooper	Julia Gilbert	8 March 2016	5.05
810	23	"Where We Belong"	Louise Hooper	Katie Douglas	15 March 2016	4.86
811	24	"Who You Are"	Jamie Annett	Patrick Homes	22 March 2016	4.81
812	25	"A Friend in Need"	Jamie Annett	Rebecca Wojciechowski	29 March 2016	4.39
813	26	"Handle With Care"	David Innes Edwards	Tony Higgins	5 April 2016	4.63
814	27	"Dark Night of the Soul"	David Innes Edwards	Michelle Lipton	12 April 2016	4.89
815	28	"Prioritise the Heart"	Steve Brett	Julia Gilbert	19 April 2016	4.31
816	29	"Out of Sight Out of Mind"	Steve Brett	Johanne McAndrew and Elliot Hope	26 April 2016	4.44
817	30	"The Coward's Way"	Karl Neilson	Kate Verghese	3 May 2016	4.42
818	31	"It Tolls for Thee"	Karl Neilson	Joe Ainsworth	10 May 2016	4.33
819	32	"Running Out"	Matthew Evans	Wendy Granditer	17 May 2016	4.28
820	33	"When I Grow Up"	Matthew Evans	Martin Jameson	24 May 2016	3.84
821	34	"The Sky Is Falling"	Paulette Randall	Andy Bayliss	31 May 2016	4.14
822	35	"I'll Walk You Home"	Paulette Randall	Andy Bayliss	7 June 2016	4.52
823	36	"Missing You Already"	Nigel Douglas	Joe Ainsworth	16 June 2016	4.31
824	37	"The Lone Ranger"	Nigel Douglas	Atiha Sen Gupta and Katie Douglas	23 June 2016	4.05
825	38	"Another Day in Paradise – Part One"	Jennie Darnell	Nick Fisher	28 June 2016	4.42
826	39	"Another Day in Paradise – Part Two"	Jennie Darnell	Nick Fisher	5 July 2016	4.10
827	40	"Children of Men"	Karl Neilson	Ed Sellek	12 July 2016	4.34
828	41	"A Perfect Life"	Karl Neilson	Julia Gilbert	19 July 2016	4.19
829	42	"From Bournemouth With Love"	Graeme Harper	Ailsa Macaulay	26 July 2016	4.12
830	43	"Back in the Ring"	Edward Dick	Jeff Povey	2 August 2016	4.40
831	44	"Indefensible"	Steve Brett	Kate Verghese and Nick Fisher	4 August 2016	4.31
832	45	"Little Acorns"	Steve Brett	Johanne McAndrew and Elliot Hope	23 August 2016	4.17
833	46	"Fractured"	Tracey Rooney	Rebecca Wojciechowski	25 August 2016	4.32
834	47	"Protect and Serve"	Steve Brett	Joe Ainsworth	30 August 2016	4.78
835	48	"Brave New World"	Tracey Rooney	Katie Douglas	6 September 2016	4.56
836	49	"Say a Little Prayer"	Jamie Annett	Sian Evans	13 September 2016	4.72
837	50	"Emotionally Yours"	Jamie Annett	Chris Murray	20 September 2016	4.66
838	51	"Life in the Freezer"	Daikin Marsh	Michelle Lipton	27 September 2016	4.70
839	52	"Snakes and Ladders"	Daikin Marsh	Michelle Lipton	4 October 2016	4.85

=== Series 19 (2016–2017) ===
No. overall	No. in series	Title	Directed by	Written by	Original release date	Viewers (millions)
840	1	"Into the Abyss"	Steve Brett	Ailsa Macaulay	11 October 2016	4.45
841	2	"Rocket Man"	Steve Brett	Peter Mattessi	18 October 2016	4.86
842	3	"Black Dog"	James Bryce	Patrick Homes	25 October 2016	4.79
843	4	"Somebody to Love"	James Bryce	Ed Sellek	1 November 2016	4.55
844	5	"Song of Self – Part One"	Paulette Randall	Kate Verghese	8 November 2016	4.72
845	6	"Song of Self – Part Two"	Paulette Randall	Kate Verghese	15 November 2016	4.42
846	7	"The Kill List"	Toby Frow	Jeff Povey	22 November 2016	4.81
847	8	"Parasite"	Toby Frow	Simon Norman	29 November 2016	4.30
848	9	"Glass Houses"	Jan Bauer	Johanne McAndrew and Elliot Hope	6 December 2016	4.77
849	10	"Hallelujah"	Jan Bauer	Becky Prestwich and Nick Fisher	13 December 2016	4.40
850	11	"The Nightmare Before Christmas"	David Tucker	Katie Douglas	20 December 2016	4.66
851	12	"Just Get on with It"	David Tucker	Simon Norman	27 December 2016	4.55
852	13	"I Do, I Do, I Do"	Dermot Boyd	Michelle Lipton	3 January 2017	5.16
853	14	"Aces High"	Jennie Darnell	Joe Ainsworth	10 January 2017	4.73
854	15	"Stick or Twist"	Jennie Darnell	Joe Ainsworth	18 January 2017	4.27
855	16	"Daylight"	Karl Neilson	Gareth Sargeant and Patrick Homes	24 January 2017	4.89
856	17	"Of Lions and Lambs"	Karl Neilson	Patrick Homes	31 January 2017	4.85
857	18	"Losing Game"	Steve Brett	Kate Verghese, Patrick Homes and Andy Bayliss	7 February 2017	4.78
858	19	"Four Letter Word"	Steve Brett	Tony Higgins and Andy Bayliss	14 February 2017	4.98
859	20	"What We Pretend to Be"	Jamie Annett	Owen Lloyd−Fox	21 February 2017	5.03
860	21	"The Price We Pay"	Jamie Annett	Chris Murray	28 February 2017	5.34
861	22	"Other People's Dreams"	Ian Barnes	Patrick Homes	7 March 2017	4.88
862	23	"The Hangover"	Ian Barnes	Simon Norman	14 March 2017	4.99
863	24	"Growing Pains"	Jermain Julien	Wendy Granditer	21 March 2017	5.01
864	25	"Unbreakable"	Jermain Julien	Johanne McAndrew and Elliot Hope	28 March 2017	5.02
865	26	"It's Only Love If It Hurts"	Karl Neilson	Nick Fisher	4 April 2017	4.31
866	27	"Someone to Look after Me"	Karl Neilson	Patrick Homes	11 April 2017	5.02
867	28	"Past Imperfect"	James Larkin	Becky Prestwich	18 April 2017	5.02
868	29	"Two Hearts"	James Larkin	Katie Douglas	25 April 2017	4.74
869	30	"Gold Star"	Lisa Mulcahy	Ed Sellek	2 May 2017	4.90
870	31	"The Heart Is a Small Thing"	Lisa Mulcahy	Sian Evans	9 May 2017	4.55
871	32	"Project Aurous"	Jermain Julien	Claire Miller	16 May 2017	4.74
872	33	"Enigma"	Jermain Julien	Peter Mattessi	23 May 2017	4.58
873	34	"Twist of the Knife"	Tracey Rooney	Jon Sen	30 May 2017	3.73
874	35	"The Hard Way Home"	Tracey Rooney	Martin Jameson and Nick Fisher	6 June 2017	4.26
875	36	"For the Love of Maureen"	Jamie Annett	Joe Ainsworth	13 June 2017	4.10
876	37	"For You May Be the Next to Die..."	Jamie Annett	Patrick Homes	20 June 2017	4.18
877	38	"Paper Wishes"	Richard Platt	Patrick Homes and Ailsa Macaulay	27 June 2017	4.62
878	39	"Keeping the Faith"	Baff Akoto	Jeff Povey	4 July 2017	4.18
879	40	"Sleep Well"	Sean Glynn	Johanne McAndrew and Elliot Hope	11 July 2017	4.60
880	41	"Going the Distance"	Sean Glynn	Chris Murray	18 July 2017	4.29
881	42	"Baggage"	Tracey Rooney	Patrick Homes	25 July 2017	4.24
882	43	"The Evolution of Woman"	Tracey Rooney	Simon Norman	1 August 2017	4.26
883	44	"Go Ugly Early"	Dominic Keavey	Nick Fisher	8 August 2017	4.04
884	45	"Calm Before the Storm"	Dominic Keavey	Katie Douglas	15 August 2017	4.13
885	46	"Wildest Dreams"	Paulette Randall	Angela Holden	22 August 2017	4.25
886	47	"Keep on Running"	Paulette Randall	Michelle Lipton	29 August 2017	3.84
887	48	"How Loud It Is"	Jamie Annett	Andy Bayliss	5 September 2017	4.07
888	49	"The Man Who Sold the World"	Jamie Annett	Joe Ainsworth	12 September 2017	4.55
889	50	"Veil of Tears – Part One"	Jan Bauer	Joe Ainsworth	19 September 2017	4.52
890	51	"Veil of Tears – Part Two"	Nigel Douglas	Michelle Lipton	26 September 2017	4.32
891	52	"Left Behind"	Nigel Douglas	Wendy Granditer	3 October 2017	4.40
892	53	"The Coming Storm"	Daikin Marsh	Patrick Homes	10 October 2017	4.28
893	54	"Thicker Than Water"	Daikin Marsh	Peter Mattessi	17 October 2017	4.19
894	55	"Things Left Unsaid"	Steve Brett	Robert Goldsbrough	24 October 2017	4.12
895	56	"Know Yourself, Know Your Enemy"	Steve Brett	Johanne McAndrew and Elliot Hope	31 October 2017	4.02
896	57	"Kingdom Come"	Jermain Julien	Ed Sellek	7 November 2017	4.17
897	58	"It Has to Be Now"	Jermain Julien	Becky Prestwich	14 November 2017	4.26
898	59	"Hungry Heart"	Thomas Hescott	Sian Evans	21 November 2017	4.15
899	60	"Hiding Places"	Thomas Hescott	Gerard Sampaio	28 November 2017	4.37
900	61	"Group Animal – Part One"	Paulette Randall	Andy Bayliss	5 December 2017	4.92
901	62	"Group Animal – Part Two"	Paulette Randall	Andy Bayliss	7 December 2017	5.19
902	63	"We Need to Talk About Fredrik"	Toby Frow	Patrick Homes	12 December 2017	4.71
903	64	"Always Forever"	Toby Frow	Simon Norman	19 December 2017	4.39

=== Series 20 (2018) ===
No. overall	No. in series	Title	Directed by	Written by	Original release date	Viewers (millions)
904	1	"The Prisoner"	Jennie Darnell	Ed Sellek	2 January 2018	4.65
905	2	"Ready or Not"	Francis Annan	Robert Goldsbrough	9 January 2018	4.88
906	3	"There by the Grace of..."	Francis Annan	Johanne McAndrew and Elliot Hope	16 January 2018	4.70
907	4	"Hanssen Is as Hanssen Does"	James Larkin	Joe Ainsworth	23 January 2018	4.12
908	5	"One Day at a Time"	James Larkin	Isla Gray	30 January 2018	4.53
909	6	"Not Your Home Now"	Baff Akoto	Patrick Homes	7 February 2018	4.02
910	7	"Precipice"	Baff Akoto	Tony Higgins	13 February 2018	4.50
911	8	"Hard Day's Night"	Daikin Marsh	Michelle Lipton	20 February 2018	4.28
912	9	"Ache"	Daikin Marsh	Martin Jameson	28 February 2018	4.29
913	10	"Square One"	Toby Frow	Kathrine Smith	6 March 2018	4.30
914	11	"The L Word"	Toby Frow	Katie Douglas	13 March 2018	4.36
915	12	"No Matter Where You Go, There You Are – Part One"	David Innes Edwards	Patrick Homes	20 March 2018	4.56
916	13	"No Matter Where You Go, There You Are – Part Two"	David Innes Edwards	Andy Bayliss	27 March 2018	4.18
917	14	"Tete a Tate"	Julie Edwards	Joe Ainsworth	3 April 2018	4.41
918	15	"Tate Gallery"	Samantha Harrie	Joe Ainsworth	10 April 2018	4.05
919	16	"New Ain't All It's Cracked Up to Be"	Steve Brett	Nick Fisher	17 April 2018	4.40
920	17	"The Way We Were"	Steve Brett	Becky Prestwich	24 April 2018	4.27
921	18	"Headstrong"	Christiana Ebohon-Green	Johanne McAndrew and Elliot Hope	1 May 2018	4.07
922	19	"Bubble Wrap"	Sean Glynn	Ed Sellek	8 May 2018	3.92
923	20	"Blind Spot"	Daikin Marsh	Katie Douglas	15 May 2018	3.81
924	21	"Belonging"	Daikin Marsh	Katie Douglas	22 May 2018	3.85
925	22	"Only a Word"	Thomas Hescott	Nick Fisher	29 May 2018	3.47
926	23	"None but the Brave"	Thomas Hescott	Gerard Sampaio	5 June 2018	3.66
927	24	"Primum Non Nocere − Part One"	Jennie Darnell	Patrick Homes	12 June 2018	3.92
928	25	"Primum Non Nocere − Part Two"	Jennie Darnell	Patrick Homes	20 June 2018	N/A (<4.52) (Note: Not reported in the weekly top 30 programmes for BBC One.)
929	26	"Fallen Idol"	Dermot Boyd	Kathrine Smith	27 June 2018	3.68
930	27	"The Anniversary Waltz"	Dermot Boyd	Joe Ainsworth	4 July 2018	N/A (<3.51)
931	28	"Into the Light"	Jamie Annett	Becky Prestwich and Nick Fisher	11 July 2018	3.92
932	29	"The Friend Zone"	Jamie Annett	Katie Douglas	17 July 2018	3.73
933	30	"Two for Joy"	Toby Frow	Ed Sellek	24 July 2018	3.85
934	31	"Child in Your Shadow"	Toby Frow	Johanne McAndrew and Elliot Hope	31 July 2018	3.83
935	32	"Bygones"	Paulette Randall	Jon Barton	8 August 2018	3.42
936	33	"Bargaining"	Paulette Randall	Katie Douglas	14 August 2018	3.63
937	34	"All Business"	Tracey Rooney	Nick Fisher	21 August 2018	3.82
938	35	"Man Down"	Tracey Rooney	Michelle Lipton	28 August 2018	3.65
939	36	"Keep Your Friends Close"	Michael Lacey	Isla Gray	4 September 2018	3.76 (Note: 7 day data due to unavailability of 28 day data.)
940	37	"All Lies Lead to the Truth"	Michael Lacey	Robert Goldsbrough	11 September 2018	3.37
941	38	"One Man and His God"	Jan Bauer	Andy Bayliss	18 September 2018	3.54
942	39	"Undoing"	Sean Glynn	Nick Fisher	25 September 2018	3.71
943	40	"Inscrutable"	Sean Glynn	Tony Higgins	2 October 2018	3.70
944	41	"The Three Musketeers"	Daikin Marsh	Joe Ainsworth	9 October 2018	3.59
945	42	"Stains"	Daikin Marsh	Patrick Homes	16 October 2018	3.95
946	43	"Too Good to Be True"	Jamie Annett	Gerard Sampaio	23 October 2018	3.60
947	44	"The Family You Choose"	Jamie Annett	Johanne McAndrew and Elliot Hope	30 October 2018	3.89
948	45	"Report to the Mirror – Part One"	David Innes Edwards	Andy Bayliss	6 November 2018	3.86
949	46	"Report to the Mirror – Part Two"	David Innes Edwards	Andy Bayliss	13 November 2018	4.11
950	47	"One of Us"	Samantha Harrie	Katie Douglas	20 November 2018	4.38
951	48	"Hold My Hand"	Samantha Harrie	Robert Goldsbrough	27 November 2018	4.16
952	49	"Love Is"	Tracey Larcombe	Michelle Lipton	4 December 2018	3.74
953	50	"The Right Sort of Animal"	Tracey Larcombe	Ed Sellek	11 December 2018	3.75
954	51	"Family Ties"	Nigel Douglas	Jane Pearson	18 December 2018	3.99
955	52	"Best Christmas Ever"	Nigel Douglas	Patrick Homes	27 December 2018	3.91

=== Series 21 (2019) ===
No. overall	No. in series	Title	Directed by	Written by	Original release date	Viewers (millions)
956	1	"Everything Old Is New Again"	Tracey Rooney	Katie Douglas	2 January 2019	N/A (<5.63) (Note: Not reported in the weekly top 15 programmes for four-screen viewer ratings.)
957	2	"China Crisis"	Ian Barnes	Joe Ainsworth	8 January 2019	3.96
958	3	"The Burden of Proof"	Ian Barnes	Gerard Sampaio	15 January 2019	4.02
959	4	"A Daring Adventure or Nothing At All"	Daikin Marsh	Isla Gray	22 January 2019	N/A (<4.79)
960	5	"Mad as Hell"	Daikin Marsh	Martin Jameson	29 January 2019	4.10
961	6	"Force Majeure"	Ruth Carney	Elliot Hope and Johanne McAndrew	5 February 2019	4.01
962	7	"Good Side"	Ruth Carney	Ed Sellek	12 February 2019	4.06
963	8	"Never Say Never"	Waris Islam	Nick Fisher and Patrick Homes	19 February 2019	4.04
964	9	"Guts"	Waris Islam	Martin Jameson and Patrick Homes	26 February 2019	4.54
965	10	"Powerless"	Steve Brett	Michelle Lipton	5 March 2019	5.04
966	11	"A Simple Lie - Part One"	Julie Edwards	Patrick Homes	19 March 2019	3.97
967	12	"A Simple Lie - Part Two"	Nimer Rashed	Patrick Homes	20 March 2019	3.76
968	13	"Running"	Stuart Jones	Tony Higgins	26 March 2019	3.70
969	14	"Ask No Questions"	Stuart Jones	Michelle Lipton and Kathrine Smith	2 April 2019	3.86
970	15	"The Family Way"	Emma Lindley	Becky Prestwich	9 April 2019	3.59
971	16	"North and South"	David Innes Edwards	Joe Ainsworth	16 April 2019	3.41
972	17	"Pleased to Meet You"	Jamie Annett	Ed Sellek	23 April 2019	3.54
973	18	"Vinegar and Honey"	Jamie Annett	Ed Sellek	30 April 2019	3.40
974	19	"Ex Marks the Spot"	Michael Lacey	Joe Ainsworth	7 May 2019	3.37
975	20	"The Wrong Horse"	Michael Lacey	Nick Fisher	14 May 2019	3.34
976	21	"Unredeemed"	Karl Neilson	Andy Bayliss	21 May 2019	3.19
977	22	"Bloodline"	Karl Neilson	Ed Sellek and Patrick Cash	28 May 2019	3.12
978	23	"In the Right Place"	Jermain Julien	Ed Sellek	4 June 2019	N/A (<3.82)
979	24	"Over My Dead Body"	Jermain Julien	Joe Ainsworth	11 June 2019	N/A (<3.88)
980	25	"Pigeon"	Paulette Randall	Andy Bayliss	20 June 2019	N/A (<4.14)
981	26	"Kiss Kiss"	Paulette Randall	Katie Douglas, Andy Bayliss, Johanne McAndrew and Elliot Hope	25 June 2019	3.25
982	27	"Flying Solo"	Sean Glynn	Martin Jameson	9 July 2019	3.24
983	28	"Reckless"	Sean Glynn	Nick Fisher	10 July 2019	3.32
984	29	"Honeymoon"	Tracey Rooney	Gerard Sampaio	16 July 2019	3.53
985	30	"Don't Leave Me"	Tracey Rooney	Alisa Macaulay	23 July 2019	3.50
986	31	"Things My Mother Told Me"	Waris Islam	Martin Jameson	30 July 2019	3.49
987	32	"When Worlds Collide"	Waris Islam	Andrew Rattenbury	6 August 2019	3.33
988	33	"Work-Life Balance"	Julie Edwards	Simon Norman	13 August 2019	3.44
989	34	"Where Does It Hurt?"	Julie Edwards	Ed Sellek	20 August 2019	3.29
990	35	"Babysitters and Bystanders"	David Innes Edwards	Ed Sellek	27 August 2019	3.34
991	36	"The Perfect Storm"	David Innes Edwards	Joe Ainsworth and Sam Wheats	3 September 2019	3.61
992	37	"Gods and Monsters"	Michael Lacey	Alex Straker	10 September 2019	3.25
993	38	"Circle of Life"	Michael Lacey	Alison Hume	17 September 2019	3.24
994	39	"Retreat"	Steve Brett	Andy Bayliss	24 September 2019	3.63
995	40	"Divine Justice"	Jamie Annett	Andy Bayliss	1 October 2019	N/A (<4.06)
996	41	"This Be the Verse"	Jamie Annett	George Holden Stroud	8 October 2019	3.64
997	42	"Hope is a Powerful Drug"	Griff Rowland	Simon Norman	15 October 2019	N/A (<4.67)
998	43	"Promise"	Griff Rowland	Patrick Homes	22 October 2019	N/A (<4.56)
999	44	"Hubble Bubble"	Tracey Rooney	Joe Ainsworth	29 October 2019	N/A (<4.72)
1000	45	"Remember, Remember"	Tracey Rooney	Joe Ainsworth	5 November 2019	N/A (<4.59)
1001	46	"Sandra's Choice"	Thomas Hescott	Damian Mullen	12 November 2019	3.69
1002	47	"We Are All the Stars"	Thomas Hescott	Katie Douglas	19 November 2019	N/A (<4.58)
1003	48	"Blurring the Lines"	Daikin Marsh	Andrew Rattenbury	26 November 2019	N/A (<4.58)
1004	49	"Bell Jar"	Daikin Marsh	Martin Jameson	3 December 2019	N/A (<4.67)
1005	50	"Kintsugi"	David Tucker	Martin Jameson	10 December 2019	3.35
1006	51	"Lemons"	David Tucker	Ed Sellek	17 December 2019	3.50
1007	52	"Be True, Be Brave, Be Kind"	Steve Brett	Ed Sellek	19 December 2019	N/A (<5.89)
1008	53	"Mothers and Their Daughters"	Steve Brett	Patrick Homes	31 December 2019	N/A (<5.23)

=== Series 22 (2020–2021) ===
No. overall	No. in series	Title	Directed by	Written by	Original release date	Viewers (millions)
1009	1	"Episode 1"	Jan Bauer	Patrick Homes	7 January 2020	N/A (<5.25)
1010	2	"Episode 2"	David Innes Edwards	Katie Douglas	15 January 2020	N/A (<4.95)
1011	3	"Episode 3"	David Innes Edwards	Katie Douglas	21 January 2020	N/A (<4.80)
1012	4	"Episode 4"	Dermot Boyd	Davey Jones	28 January 2020	N/A (<4.99)
1013	5	"Episode 5"	Dermot Boyd	Nick Fisher	5 February 2020	N/A (<5.02)
1014	6	"Episode 6"	Daikin Marsh	Claire Miller	11 February 2020	N/A (<4.85)
1015	7	"Episode 7"	Daikin Marsh	Johanne McAndrew & Elliot Hope	18 February 2020	N/A (<4.62)
1016	8	"Episode 8"	Waris Islam	Alex Straker	25 February 2020	N/A (<4.62)
1017	9	"Episode 9"	Waris Islam	Damian Mullen	26 February 2020	N/A (<4.62)
1018	10	"Episode 10"	Jamie Annett	Isla Gray	10 March 2020	N/A (<4.61)
1019	11	"Episode 11"	Jamie Annett	Ed Sellek	24 March 2020	N/A (<5.68)
1020	12	"Episode 12"	Steve Brett	Ed Sellek	31 March 2020	N/A (<6.43)
1021	13	"Episode 13"	Steve Brett	Simon Norman	7 April 2020	N/A (<5.47)
1022	14	"Episode 14"	Griff Rowland	Joe Ainsworth	14 April 2020	N/A (<5.44)
1023	15	"Episode 15"	Griff Rowland	Becky Prestwich	2 June 2020	N/A (<4.37)
1024	16	"Episode 16"	Jennie Darnell	Phil Mulryne	9 June 2020	N/A (<4.14)
1025	17	"Episode 17"	Jennie Darnell	Johnny Candon	16 June 2020	N/A (<4.58)
1026	18	"Episode 18"	David Innes Edwards	Katie Douglas	23 June 2020	N/A (<3.94)
1027	19	"Episode 19"	David Innes Edwards	Katie Douglas	30 June 2020	N/A (<4.04)
1028	20	"Episode 20"	Dean Byfield	Julie Parsons	7 July 2020	N/A (<4.16)
1029	21	"Episode 21"	Dean Byfield	Ed Sellek	14 July 2020	N/A (<3.92)
1030	22	"Episode 22"	Karl Neilson	Davey Jones	21 July 2020	N/A (<3.68)
1031	23	"Episode 23"	Karl Neilson	Nick Fisher	28 July 2020	N/A (<4.04)
1032	24	"Episode 24"	Tracey Rooney	Lucia Haynes	4 August 2020	N/A (<3.77)
1033	25	"Episode 25"	Tracey Rooney	Joe Ainsworth	11 August 2020	N/A (<3.71)
1034	26	"Episode 26"	Steve Brett	Patrick Homes	10 November 2020	N/A (<5.12)
1035	27	"Episode 27"	Griff Rowland	Joe Ainsworth	17 November 2020	N/A (<4.72)
1036	28	"Episode 28"	Griff Rowland	Ciara Conway	24 November 2020	N/A (<5.00)
1037	29	"Episode 29"	Paulette Randall	Andy Bayliss	1 December 2020	N/A (<4.84)
1038	30	"Episode 30"	Paulette Randall	Ed Sellek	8 December 2020	N/A (<5.06)
1039	31	"Episode 31"	Steve Brett	Damian Mullen	15 December 2020	N/A (<5.18)
1040	32	"Episode 32"	Steve Brett	Katie Douglas	5 January 2021	N/A (<5.28)
1041	33	"Episode 33"	Jamie Annett	Rebekah Harrison	12 January 2021	N/A (<4.65)
1042	34	"Episode 34"	Jamie Annett	Patrick Homes	19 January 2021	N/A
1043	35	"Episode 35"	Karl Neilson	Joe Ainsworth	26 January 2021	N/A
1044	36	"Episode 36"	Karl Neilson	Joe Ainsworth	2 February 2021	N/A
1045	37	"Episode 37"	Dean Byfield	Ciara Conway	10 February 2021	N/A
1046	38	"Episode 38"	Dean Byfield	Ciara Conway	16 February 2021	N/A
1047	39	"Episode 39"	David Innes Edwards	Michelle Lipton	23 February 2021	N/A
1048	40	"Episode 40"	David Innes Edwards	Becky Prestwich	2 March 2021	N/A
1049	41	"Episode 41"	Daikin Marsh	Katie Douglas	9 March 2021	N/A
1050	42	"Episode 42"	Daikin Marsh	Andy Bayliss	16 March 2021	N/A
1051	43	"Episode 43"	Steve Brett	Ed Sellek	23 March 2021	N/A
1052	44	"Episode 44"	Steve Brett	Lydia Marchant	30 March 2021	N/A

=== Series 23 (2021–2022) ===
No. overall	No. in series	Title	Directed by	Written by	Original release date	Viewers (millions)
1053	1	"Episode 1"	Dean Byfield	Patrick Homes	6 April 2021	N/A (<4.14)
1054	2	"Episode 2"	Dean Byfield	Lucia Haynes	13 April 2021	N/A (<4.27)
1055	3	"Episode 3"	David Innes Edwards	Rebekah Harrison	20 April 2021	N/A (<4.13)
1056	4	"Episode 4"	David Innes Edwards	Joe Ainsworth	27 April 2021	N/A (<4.24)
1057	5	"Episode 5"	Daikin Marsh	Ciara Conway	4 May 2021	N/A (<4.08)
1058	6	"Episode 6"	Daikin Marsh	Tom Powell	11 May 2021	N/A (<4.40)
1059	7	"Episode 7"	Suri Krishnamma	Davey Jones	18 May 2021	N/A (<4.12)
1060	8	"Episode 8"	Suri Krishnamma	Isla Gray	25 May 2021	N/A (<4.00)
1061	9	"Episode 9"	Jamie Annett	Joe Ainsworth	1 June 2021	N/A (<3.58)
1062	10	"Episode 10"	Jamie Annett	Michelle Lipton	8 June 2021	N/A (<3.76)
1063	11	"Episode 11"	Steve Brett	Phil Mulryne	15 June 2021	N/A (<3.87)
1064	12	"Episode 12"	Steve Brett	Andy Bayliss	22 June 2021	N/A (<3.65)
1065	13	"Episode 13"	Dean Byfield	Katie Douglas	28 June 2021	N/A (<3.55)
1066	14	"Episode 14"	Dean Byfield	Jenny Davis	7 July 2021	N/A (<3.46)
1067	15	"Episode 15"	Christopher McGill	Patrick Homes	13 July 2021	N/A (<3.41)
1068	16	"Episode 16"	Christopher McGill	Becky Prestwich	20 July 2021	N/A (<3.32)
1069	17	"Episode 17"	David Innes Edwards	Joe Ainsworth	27 July 2021	N/A (<3.41)
1070	18	"Episode 18"	David Innes Edwards	Johnny McKnight	3 August 2021	N/A (<3.61)
1071	19	"Episode 19"	Katherine Churcher	Ciara Conway	10 August 2021	N/A (<3.52)
1072	20	"Episode 20"	Katherine Churcher	Katerina Watson	17 August 2021	N/A (<3.70)
1073	21	"Episode 21"	Karl Neilson	Saneh Ali and Matt Naylor	24 August 2021	N/A (<3.59)
1074	22	"Episode 22"	Karl Neilson	Davey Jones	31 August 2021	N/A (<3.67)
1075	23	"Episode 23"	Dean Byfield	Andy Bayliss	7 September 2021	N/A (<3.74)
1076	24	"Episode 24"	Dean Byfield	Isla Gray	14 September 2021	N/A (<3.92)
1077	25	"Episode 25"	Steve Brett	Katie Douglas	21 September 2021	N/A (<3.72)
1078	26	"Episode 26"	Steve Brett	Kellie Smith	28 September 2021	N/A (<3.97)
1079	27	"Episode 27"	Jean Stewart	Jess Green	5 October 2021	N/A (<3.89)
1080	28	"Episode 28"	Jean Stewart	Patrick Homes	12 October 2021	N/A (<3.61)
1081	29	"Episode 29"	Martin Smith	Rebekah Harrison	19 October 2021	N/A (<4.03)
1082	30	"Episode 30"	Martin Smith	Ed Sellek	26 October 2021	N/A (<4.14)
1083	31	"Episode 31"	Tania Diez	Rebecca Wojciechowski	2 November 2021	N/A (<4.02)
1084	32	"Episode 32"	Tania Diez	Emma Dennis-Edwards	9 November 2021	N/A (<4.12)
1085	33	"Episode 33"	David Innes Edwards	Emily Groves	16 November 2021	N/A (<4.10)
1086	34	"Episode 34"	David Innes Edwards	Ciara Conway	23 November 2021	N/A (<4.45)
1087	35	"Episode 35"	Emma Lindley	Philip Lawrence	30 November 2021	N/A (<4.35)
1088	36	"Episode 36"	Emma Lindley	Joe Ainsworth	7 December 2021	N/A (<4.13)
1089	37	"Episode 37"	Christopher McGill	Kat Rose-Martin	14 December 2021	N/A (<4.21)
1090	38	"Episode 38"	Christopher McGill	Isla Gray	4 January 2022	N/A (<4.73)
1091	39	"Episode 39"	Jamie Annett	Davey Jones	11 January 2022	N/A (<4.35)
1092	40	"Episode 40"	Jamie Annett	Andy Bayliss	18 January 2022	N/A (<4.04)
1093	41	"Episode 41"	Miranda Howard-Williams	Rebecca Harrison	25 January 2022	N/A (<4.31)
1094	42	"Episode 42"	Miranda Howard-Williams	Ed Sellek and Jayshree Patel	1 February 2022	N/A
1095	43	"Episode 43"	Michael Lacey	Michelle Lipton	8 February 2022	N/A
1096	44	"Episode 44"	Michael Lacey	Isla Gray	15 February 2022	N/A
1097	45	"Episode 45"	Karl Neilson	Ciara Conway	22 February 2022	N/A
1098	46	"Episode 46"	Karl Neilson	Sophia Leonie	28 February 2022	N/A
1099	47	"Episode 47"	Jamie Annett	Patrick Homes	8 March 2022	N/A
1100	48	"Episode 48"	Jamie Annett	Katie Douglas	15 March 2022	N/A
1101	49	"Episode 49"	David Innes Edwards	Andy Bayliss	22 March 2022	N/A
1102	50	"Episode 50"	David Innes Edwards	Joe Ainsworth	29 March 2022	3.11

== Specials ==
=== Making It At Holby ===
Making It At Holby is a documentary which explores the creation and casting of Holby City characters Donna Jackson (Jaye Jacobs) and Mickie Hendrie (Kelly Adams) as well as Casualty character Steve (Simon Kassianides). It was commissioned as part of BBC Talent Week, which focuses on new BBC talent and content across a week. It was broadcast on 23 March 2004, during the same week that the characters debut on screen. The documentary follows the audition process through to the first days of filming. It also features cast members from Holby City and Casualty discussing receiving their "TV breaks" on the dramas. The documentary chronicles Jacobs being mentored by actress Jan Pearson (Kath Fox), Hendrie by actor Ian Aspinall (Mubbs Hussein) and Kassianides by actor James Redmond (Abs Denham). David Chater of The Times listed Making It At Holby in the television highlights for its day of broadcast.

No.	Title	Directed by	Original release date	Viewers (millions)
1	"Making It At Holby"	Nick Bray	23 March 2004	N/A (<5.96)
Documentary produced for BBC Talent Week, chronicling the casting of Holby City actresses Jaye Jacobs and Kelly Adams, and Casualty actor Simon Kassianides.

=== Casualty@Holby City ===
No.	Episode	Directed by	Written by	Original release date	UK viewers (millions)
1	"Casualty@Holby City: Part One"	Michael Offer	Johanne McAndrew	26 December 2004	8.91
2	"Casualty@Holby City: Part Two"	Michael Offer	Johanne McAndrew	28 December 2004	8.82
3	"Something We Can Do"	Shani S. Grewal	Steve Lightfoot	27 August 2005	7.32
4	"Teacher's Pet"	Rob Evans	Jason Sutton	24 October 2005	5.56
5	"Crash and Burn"	Rob Evans	Jason Sutton	25 October 2005	5.96
6	"Test Your Metal"	Rob Evans	Suzie Smith	26 October 2005	4.57
7	"A Great Leap Forward"	Rob Evans	Suzie Smith	27 October 2005	5.64
8	"Deny Thy Father: Part One"	Paul Harrison	Al Hunter Ashton & Pete Hambly	24 December 2005	8.00
9	"Deny Thy Father: Part Two"	Paul Harrison	Gaby Chiappe	27 December 2005	8.86

== Bibliography ==
- Haasler, Sue (2018). Holby City: Behind the Screen. SilverWood Books Ltd. ISBN 978-1-78132-562-9.
