= Holby City series 21 =

Holby City
- Series 21
- The Series 21 Cast Image
- No. of episodes: 53

Release
- Original network: BBC One; BBC One HD
- Original release: 2 January – 31 December 2019

Series chronology
- ← Previous; Series 20 Next → Series 22

The twenty-first series of the British medical drama television series Holby City began Airing on BBC One on 2 January 2019 in the United Kingdom. The series consists of 53 episodes. Kate Hall acts as the series producer for episode one and was replaced by Jane Wallbank from the following episode; Simon Harper is the executive producer. The series is billed as an anniversary year for the drama as it celebrates twenty years since its launch. The series also features a crossover episode with sister show Casualty, an episode written by the show's co-creator Tony McHale and the show's 1000th episode, due to be broadcast in November 2019. Thirteen actors reprise their roles from the previous series and former cast members return for guest stints throughout the series. Three new regular characters were also introduced, while Nic Jackman was promoted to the main cast in his role as foundation doctor Cameron Dunn.

== Episodes ==
No. overall	No. in series	Title	Directed by	Written by	Original release date	Viewers (millions)
956	1	"Everything Old Is New Again"	Tracey Rooney	Katie Douglas	2 January 2019	N/A (<5.63) (Note: Not reported in the weekly top 15 programmes for four-screen viewer ratings.)
Jac, Ric and Sacha face off against old rivals while pitching for a million-pound prize fund. Serena's new year is once again marked by tragedy when a loved one is brought in for emergency surgery.
957	2	"China Crisis"	Ian Barnes	Joe Ainsworth	8 January 2019	3.96
A surprise blast from the distant past returns to run a Young Adult Unit alongside top consultant Ange Godard. He successfully puts everyone on tenterhooks with his notorious barbs and quips, until things take a surprising turn, much to everyone's surprise. Nicky competes with Cameron for the junior doctor lead position only to realise that high accolades aren't everything when it to come to surgery. Serena steps in to protect her ward when an old face from the past turns up and offends them. Serena fails to see the funny side and takes control.
958	3	"The Burden of Proof"	Ian Barnes	Gerard Sampaio	15 January 2019	4.02
Ange finally allows Dominic the chance to work on her new unit, after much persistence, but she isn't sure whether he has the chops to be a great doctor. When Dominic is economical with the truth, Ange has to confront him and then feels that he's not trustworthy. Nicky and Cameron find common ground when they have to work alongside an unforgiving Jac. Struggling to prove that he's worthy, Cameron goes all out to impress her. Ric's former wife Lola returns to Holby to work alongside her former flame on AAU. Serena and Zav are highly amused by the tension between them, but Ric soon realises that he actually has residual feelings for his ex.
959	4	"A Daring Adventure or Nothing At All"	Daikin Marsh	Isla Gray	22 January 2019	N/A (<4.79)
Frieda is happy her life is on an even keel, but her contentment is shattered when her ex-boyfriend Roman unexpectedly reappears. With their relationship going well, Xavier is keen to step up and ease the burdens weighing on a stressed Donna. But all does not entirely go to plan when Zav embarks on some impromptu parenting of Mia. Ange feels the pressure as she works to sell her vision for her Young Adult Unit while treating a difficult and vulnerable patient. But striving to be all things to all people, Ange fails to get to grips with the behaviour of a returning colleague who might really need help.
960	5	"Mad as Hell"	Daikin Marsh	Martin Jameson	29 January 2019	4.10
When Holby is overwhelmed by a winter crisis, Ric goes above and beyond to treat his patients. To Jac and Fletch's concern, a grief-stricken Frieda immerses herself completely in work, but when she's challenged by a patient's confrontational father, and with her emotions running high, Frieda embarks on a fight she has to win. When Ange has her work cut out on YAU thanks to an obstinate teenager, it's down to Essie to persuade an unwilling Ange to enlist help from a source who's a bit too close to home.
961	6	"Force Majeure"	Ruth Carney	Elliot Hope and Johanne McAndrew	5 February 2019	4.01
When a family secret is exposed, the dispute causes a young patient to delay vital surgery, but fearing the consequences of such a decision, a concerned Ange must find a way to make her reconsider. Keen to highlight the constant pressures Holby faces on a daily basis, Ric enlists the help of an influential acquaintance. When the opportunity to attend an overseas conference arises, Nicky and Cameron must battle it out.
962	7	"Good Side"	Ruth Carney	Ed Sellek	12 February 2019	4.06
While Holly's condition weighs heavily on an emotionally invested Ange, Holly's distraught parents must put their differences aside to make a heartbreaking decision. When new locum Chloe covers on Darwin, a smitten Cameron sets out to impress. There's no love lost between Xavier and Carole, so when a disgruntled Xavier is tasked with treating spiritual Carole, it's clear she's not the only one in pain.
963	8	"Never Say Never"	Waris Islam	Nick Fisher and Patrick Homes	19 February 2019	4.04
Zosia arrives at Holby keen to get back working on Darwin. Ange struggles with Holly's parents who are intent on fighting for their daughter. When an offer of hope for radical treatment comes from America, Ange does her best to make them see what is really best for their daughter. Donna and Xavier struggle to keep their domestic arguments at home.
964	9	"Guts"	Waris Islam	Martin Jameson and Patrick Homes	26 February 2019	4.54
Zosia's big news gets a mixed response, and Jac remains suspicious about her real reasons for returning to Holby. Zosia's situation is further complicated when a handsome American turns up wanting to tempt her back across the Atlantic. Sacha is rattled and embarrassed when an old flame appears on the ward with their ill partner. Following diagnosis, Sacha gets to try out his new transplant procedure and by the end of the day has two reasons to celebrate. Following an incident with protestors, Jason refuses to leave Hanssen's office until his demands are met. Despite Serena’s pleading, he stands firm and eventually a difficult decision is made about a long-term patient, much to Ange’s annoyance.
965	10	"Powerless"	Steve Brett	Michelle Lipton	5 March 2019	5.04
A computer virus shuts down Holby’s power, putting Jac and Connie at loggerheads as they fight against all odds and in makeshift conditions to save the lives of close friends and colleagues. During a hospital-wide evacuation, Ric mounts a daring rescue for a trapped and weakening Essie – even as he struggles with a shocking revelation about Darla. In the midst of chaos, Ange and Serena try to agree on how best to care for Holly, who continues on life-support.
966	11	"A Simple Lie - Part One"	Julie Edwards	Patrick Homes	19 March 2019	3.97
A desperate Ange pleads with Holly’s family to see reason, but when the ruling comes back, the anger finally boils over with devastating consequences for Fletch. Ric's son Kofi arrives at Holby wanting to find out what’s going on with Darla. Struggling to keep his granddaughter's pregnancy a secret, Ric battles to keep his family together and do what’s right for everyone. An excited Zosia looks forward to working with Frieda, only she doesn’t get the reception she was expecting. As the pair team up to tackle a case, Zosia does her best to win over Frieda, with hilarious results.
967	12	"A Simple Lie - Part Two"	Nimer Rashed	Patrick Homes	20 March 2019	3.76
As the protesters grow angrier Holby tightens security, Fletch realises there may be darker forces at play with Theo’s disappearance. Chloe struggles to decide if staying at Holby is the right thing to do. Dom tries to persuade her, but is thrown off by a surprise visitor. A romantic evening doesn’t go as planned for Xavier and Donna when his mother arrives, putting Donna in a difficult position.
968	13	"Running"	Stuart Jones	Tony Higgins	26 March 2019	3.70
Ange follows a hunch and ends up uncovering a shocking and long buried secret – one with the potential to tear her life completely apart. A downbeat Frieda faces tough choices when an old friend of Roman’s appears in Holby in desperate need of help. Cameron and Xavier are forced together on Darwin, where Xavier appears to take delight in Cameron’s dating woes.
969	14	"Ask No Questions"	Stuart Jones	Michelle Lipton and Kathrine Smith	2 April 2019	3.86
Chloe is surprised and immediately wrongfooted when ex-boyfriend Evan unexpectedly turns up on Darwin Ward. Is it possible he’s simply there to care for his sister Phoebe? As Ange reels from her recent earth-shattering discovery and tries to plan her next move, Carole unexpectedly confronts Dominic with painful and long-buried secrets from his past. In the midst of a chaotic shift, Donna is surprised by Mia’s unexpected appearance – forcing Donna to navigate some sensitive parenting territory.
970	15	"The Family Way"	Emma Lindley	Becky Prestwich	9 April 2019	3.59
A bewildered Dom struggles to come to terms with the fact that Ange is his biological mother, and he immerses himself in work. However being around Ange proves difficult, causing Dom to make a drastic decision about his career. Donna will do anything to protect her daughter, but when she oversteps the line in a well-meaning attempt to shield Mia, Donna’s parenting is called into question. An enthusiastic Zosia is keen to take on more challenging cases but Jac, still privately resentful towards Zosia, sidelines her. Feeling disgruntled, Zosia undermines Jac’s authority, but it only adds strain to their already fraught relationship.
971	16	"North and South"	David Innes Edwards	Joe Ainsworth	16 April 2019	3.41
A startling incident forces Zosia to reconsider her future at Holby, Cameron has to treat a close relative of Xavier's, and Dom tries to keep Carole at arm's length.
972	17	"Pleased to Meet You"	Jamie Annett	Ed Sellek	23 April 2019	3.54
Jac’s top-dog status is challenged when a talented new surgeon starts at Holby and instantly causes a stir. Dom is irritated when Carole starts work on reception, and Ange tries to limit family fallout. Donna is flattered to be offered a new career opportunity
973	18	"Vinegar and Honey"	Jamie Annett	Ed Sellek	30 April 2019	3.40
Kian’s big personality and alternative methods are beginning to grate on Jac. Fletch reminds her that she’s only as good as her team and should allow him to thrive. Dom tells Ange he wants to be a proper part of her and Chloe’s lives. In response Ange finally opens up to Dom, revealing a big family secret. When Sue makes a big mistake on her first day at the new job, Donna covers it up. However being the favourite of the new boss poses new challenges.
974	19	"Ex Marks the Spot"	Michael Lacey	Joe Ainsworth	7 May 2019	3.37
Ange plans to tell Chloe her biggest secret, but a surprise locum throws her day into disarray. Ric’s granddaughter, Darla, arrives at Holby, forcing Ric to deal with her pregnancy head on. Kian rallies Nicky and Cameron to help him find out who Jac’s mystery patient is.
975	20	"The Wrong Horse"	Michael Lacey	Nick Fisher	14 May 2019	3.34
As Chloe tries to come to terms with the news that Dominic is her half-brother, she’s forced to operate with him and Ange. But as tension boils over, Evan helps her uncover a home truth. Lofty returns to Holby after the holiday of a lifetime. With something clearly on his mind, he wants to speak to Dominic but misses his moment when he learns that Ange is Dominic’s birth mother. When an infestation of rodents takes refuge at Sacha’s home, he decides it’s time to move out of Jac’s house and leave her in peace. Jac worries whether he’s really ready.
976	21	"Unredeemed"	Karl Neilson	Andy Bayliss	21 May 2019	3.19
Dominic faces his difficult past when he goes head to head with his abusive ex, Isaac. Ange and Carole band together in order to cope with the fact that Isaac has returned, affecting Dominic’s life. Jac’s conscience is thrown into conflict when she meets a previous patient who has something she wants. .
977	22	"Bloodline"	Karl Neilson	Ed Sellek and Patrick Cash	28 May 2019	3.12
Lofty and Dom’s marriage struggles to survive under the pressure of Isaac’s presence at Holby, and Sacha’s relationship with Patricia takes a turn in the wrong direction.
978	23	"In the Right Place"	Jermain Julien	Ed Sellek	4 June 2019	N/A (<3.82)
As Dom and Isaac grow closer, is Dom at risk of falling under his spell? Hanssen finds himself in unfamiliar territory when an estranged relative arrives at Holby, and Chloe gets an unpleasant surprise when she returns to work.
979	24	"Over My Dead Body"	Jermain Julien	Joe Ainsworth	11 June 2019	N/A (<3.88)
The manipulative Isaac continues to drive a wedge between Dom and Lofty, but when Isaac puts Lofty in harm’s way, the net is closing in. Good intentions backfire for Cameron when an intervention doesn’t go his way, but when faced with an opportunity to protect Chloe, Cameron makes a selfless gesture. Hanssen must navigate the world of parenting to figure out what’s troubling his unusually quiet grandson Oskar.
980	25	"Pigeon"	Paulette Randall	Andy Bayliss	20 June 2019	N/A (<4.14)
When Xavier’s mum arrives on AAU talking in riddles, Donna does her best to shelter him from her behaviour - but will he appreciate the intervention? Sacha makes a romantic gesture but finds something unexpected in Patricia’s cleaning cupboard. Nicky turns her nose up at working with Jac, who ensures she’ll live to regret it.
981	26	"Kiss Kiss"	Paulette Randall	Katie Douglas, Andy Bayliss, Johanne McAndrew and Elliot Hope	25 June 2019	3.25
Xavier tries to build bridges with Donna, but she’s having none of it. Cameron can’t quite shift his feelings of unease around Evan, and when he overhears a phone call his suspicions are confirmed. And Fletch is anxious about his first official date with Ange, especially when work threatens to get in the way.
982	27	"Flying Solo"	Sean Glynn	Martin Jameson	9 July 2019	3.24
Cameron tries to prove himself to Kian, but they clash over Kian's teaching methods. A frustrated Xavier gets relationship advice from the most unlikely source, and Carole opens up to Hanssen about her woes with Dominic and impending divorce.
983	28	"Reckless"	Sean Glynn	Nick Fisher	10 July 2019	3.32
Chloe’s day is thrown into chaos when Evan is attacked. With his life on the line, Evan asks Chloe a surprising question. Dominic is put under pressure when a surprise visitor arrives at Holby looking for Lofty. Wanting to keep his marriage intact, Dominic is forced to make a difficult decision. And after a night of partying together, Serena and Fleur Fanshawe are thrown together to help a patient on AAU.
984	29	"Honeymoon"	Tracey Rooney	Gerard Sampaio	16 July 2019	3.53
As her loved ones continue to worry about her, Chloe learns more about Evan. Cameron wants to get out from under Bernie’s shadow, but he receives some devastating news. Hanssen learns that his grandson is not the only one who believes in the tooth fairy.
985	30	"Don't Leave Me"	Tracey Rooney	Alisa Macaulay	23 July 2019	3.50
On the anniversary of a personal tragedy, Kian decides he must save a life today. Hanssen worries that with his family history he shouldn’t look after Oskar and wonders whether nature or nurture will have a greater effect on his grandson. Cameron struggles to accept some recent news and refuses help from Alex. When Serena tries to help him, she receives surprising news.
986	31	"Things My Mother Told Me"	Waris Islam	Martin Jameson	30 July 2019	3.49
As the Holby team give a warm send off to a much beloved colleague, a surprising revelation sends Cameron into a spin. However, Cameron crosses the line when his drunken behaviour spills onto the ward.
987	32	"When Worlds Collide"	Waris Islam	Andrew Rattenbury	6 August 2019	3.33
Jac’s work-life balance is called into question when her ex’s new fiancee arrives at Holby with Emma in tow, and she’s forced to make a career changing decision. As Serena's tough façade slowly unravels, grief might finally be catching up with her. And Dominic is on a mission to find out what Hanssen and Carole are secretly up to.
988	33	"Work-Life Balance"	Julie Edwards	Simon Norman	13 August 2019	3.44
Chloe wants to tell Evan that she wants a divorce. Hanssen is faced with choosing between work and his personal life. Dom and Lofty's therapist shows up as a patient.
989	34	"Where Does It Hurt?"	Julie Edwards	Ed Sellek	20 August 2019	3.29
Raf di Lucca's relative turns up looking for him, and Essie finds out her secret. Xav questions Ric’s competence and Nicky learns to trust her instincts – and that includes suspicions about sinister Evan too.
990	35	"Babysitters and Bystanders"	David Innes Edwards	Ed Sellek	27 August 2019	3.34
Chloe's day is thrown into chaos when Evan's sister, Phoebe, returns to Holby. Essie is left torn when she is forced to make a difficult decision, and a high profile patient is admitted to AAU.
991	36	"The Perfect Storm"	David Innes Edwards	Joe Ainsworth and Sam Wheats	3 September 2019	3.61
Jac is devastated when Faye Morton returns to Holby bringing Joseph with her. Sacha struggles to do the right thing for a family grieving their mother.
992	37	"Gods and Monsters"	Michael Lacey	Alex Straker	10 September 2019	3.25
A friendly face from the past - Mrs Tan - gives Ric someone to confide in. Fletch goes on a mission that could cost him his relationship with Ange.
993	38	"Circle of Life"	Michael Lacey	Alison Hume	17 September 2019	3.24
Ric worries that something may be wrong with him. Essie’s lie about Isla’s adopted mother might get exposed.
994	39	"Retreat"	Steve Brett	Andy Bayliss	24 September 2019	3.63
Evan refuses to give up on Chloe and proves what a real threat he can be. Ange quits her shift to go help her daughter. Cameron abandons his quest to help Ric when he receives heart-breaking news.
995	40	"Divine Justice"	Jamie Annett	Andy Bayliss	1 October 2019	N/A (<4.06)
Chloe and Evan both have their own versions to tell about the shocking events that occurred earlier. Grieving Cameron tries to make amends for failing Chloe when she needed him the most? Ric's health problems force him to take an MRI scan.
996	41	"This Be the Verse"	Jamie Annett	George Holden Stroud	8 October 2019	3.64
Both Ric and Darla are faced with life-changing decisions, an aggressive stranger at the hospital threatens to blow Essie’s baby secret wide open, and Kian's ex-girlfriend Bea turns up on Darwin.
997	42	"Hope is a Powerful Drug"	Griff Rowland	Simon Norman	15 October 2019	N/A (<4.67)
Essie is torn when Frankie returns wanting to take Isla home, Ric is caught between Serena and top neurosurgeon Max McGerry as they clash over his treatment options, and Jac returns from holiday and wastes no time in winding up a stressed Kian.
998	43	"Promise"	Griff Rowland	Patrick Homes	22 October 2019	N/A (<4.56)
Max performs dangerous brain surgery on Ric, who must confront his own mortality. Dom is shocked when Helen returns to Holby, and Lofty finds out she is pregnant.
999	44	"Hubble Bubble"	Tracey Rooney	Joe Ainsworth	29 October 2019	N/A (<4.72)
It’s Halloween and Cameron is haunted by his own ghosts. Jac receives a bombshell from Stacey, and will Dominic overstep the mark when it comes to Lofty’s baby?
1000	45	"Remember, Remember"	Tracey Rooney	Joe Ainsworth	5 November 2019	N/A (<4.59)
Jac is due to perform a milestone surgery, but personal issues threaten to cloud her judgement. It's Holby City Hospital's 150th birthday and Elliot Hope returns for Fletch's VIP celebration, but the reason for his visit is much more serious than they expected. Ric is discharged from hospital after his brain surgery.
1001	46	"Sandra's Choice"	Thomas Hescott	Damian Mullen	12 November 2019	3.69
As Elliot’s concern for Jac grows, he struggles to tell Jac his own secret. Lofty is determined to be there for his new family, but everything doesn't go as planned. Sacha is conflicted when his feelings for Essie resurface.
1002	47	"We Are All the Stars"	Thomas Hescott	Katie Douglas	19 November 2019	N/A (<4.58)
A heartbroken Lofty and Helen are rocked by tragic news which tears their world apart. A guilty Xavier evaluates his working relationship with Donna, and Darwin’s mortality and morbidity review doesn't look for Jac.
1003	48	"Blurring the Lines"	Daikin Marsh	Andrew Rattenbury	26 November 2019	N/A (<4.58)
Kian is desperate to deliver the surgery that Bea desires, but a stressed Jac won't play ball. Dom and Lofty are too busy putting others first and not dealing with their own problems. Donna distracts herself by focusing on returning patient Cherie Grimes. But when fun-loving Cherie goes missing, Donna must convince her to face her fears.
1004	49	"Bell Jar"	Daikin Marsh	Martin Jameson	3 December 2019	N/A (<4.67)
Elliot needs life-saving surgery. Jac is the only one qualified to do it, but her struggles with anxiety only make things much worse. Cameron sees an opportunity to make amends for past actions, but does so by manipulating a patient’s relative for his own ends. Still struggling with grief, Dom and Lofty are thrown when Carole returns from holiday blissfully unaware of their loss.
1005	50	"Kintsugi"	David Tucker	Martin Jameson	10 December 2019	3.35
Jac has to face some home truths as she finds herself in the Psychiatric Unit where she's visited by the three wise men. Chloe gets some life-changing news that she has to share with Evan's sister, Phoebe. Xav and Cameron battle to save the life of a young stab victim, but they soon discover that the girl isn't as innocent as she seems when her mother turns up.
1006	51	"Lemons"	David Tucker	Ed Sellek	17 December 2019	3.50
On the day he and Dom are due to renew their wedding vows, Lofty finally makes a decision about what he really wants in life. A newly pregnant Chloe wrestles with her conscience, and Sacha attempts to put himself first, which means he has to say no to hosting Christmas with Essie.
1007	52	"Be True, Be Brave, Be Kind"	Steve Brett	Ed Sellek	19 December 2019	N/A (<5.89)
When Bea requires emergency surgery, a suspended Kian takes matters into his own hands. Essie’s feathers are ruffled by a flash new consultant Ben Sherwood, and Dominic receives an unwanted Christmas gift.
1008	53	"Mothers and Their Daughters"	Steve Brett	Patrick Homes	31 December 2019	N/A (<5.23)
Confronted with an unwelcome patient, Serena is forced to make a life or death choice. Chloe decides she’s ready to move on in 2020, but her decisions might hurt Nicky. Ange and Fletch plan their first New Year’s Eve together, but will Sacha and Dominic’s interference scupper their plans?

== Production ==
"The show will, of course, remain true to the question that has always summarised it – how do you balance work and personal life in a profession that demands everything in the pressured landscape of the modern NHS."

—Harper on the themes of the series. (2018)

The series commenced on 2 January 2019 on BBC One and normally airs on Tuesday nights, although episode 1 and 12 were originally broadcast on a Wednesday evening. Episode 11 was also postponed by a week due to a vote on ongoing Brexit negotiations, and the following episode was consequently postponed to the following evening. Simon Harper continues his role as the executive producer of the show. Kate Hall serves as the series producer for the opening episode, and was replaced by Jane Wallbank from episode two. The series consists of 53 episodes.

Plans for the series and the show's twentieth anniversary celebrations were announced on 11 December 2018, followed by a trailer for upcoming storylines. The series commences with a standalone episode focusing on three of the show's longest-serving characters: Ric Griffin (Hugh Quarshie), Jac Naylor (Rosie Marcel) and Sacha Levy (Bob Barrett). The episode is billed as "funny, sad and celebratory" and sees the characters at an awards ceremony. Harper confirmed that former characters would return throughout the series. He explained that the series would feature "a whole anniversary year of treats which celebrate the new, but also pay homage to the old – the show's heritage and history." He also confirmed that the series would feature experimental episodes and an episode written by the show's co-creator Tony McHale. Additionally, Harper announced plans for the show's 1000th episode, to air on 5 November 2019.

=== Crossovers ===
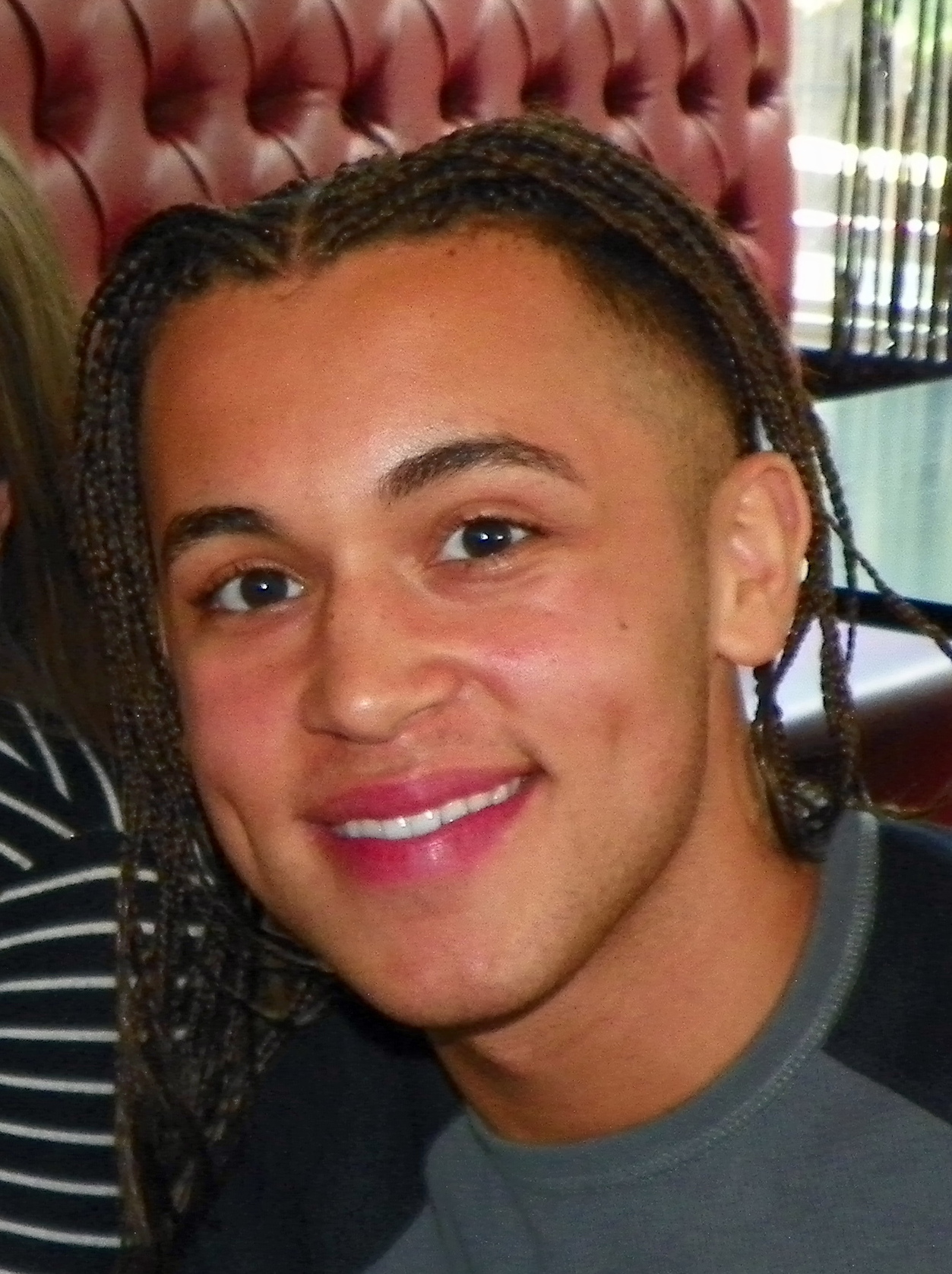
Shaheen Jafargholi appears in the crossover episode as his Casualty character, Marty Kirkby.

This series features crossover events with Holby City's sister show Casualty. In August 2018, Lucy Raffety, the series producer of Casualty, told Sophie Dainty of Digital Spy that Harper enjoys the crossover events between the two dramas and wanted to produce more. She also teased some "extremely exciting crossovers". In a December 2018 interview with Dainty, Harper promised further crossovers between Holby City and Casualty, and teased an "exciting" event to be aired in spring 2019.

On 15 February 2019, it was announced that Holby City would crossover with sister show Casualty for two episodes, billed as "CasualtyXHolby", in March as part of the anniversary celebrations. The episodes are billed as "dramatic [and] action-packed". Both episodes were written by Michelle Lipton and directed by Steve Brett. The episodes see the hospital attacked by a cyber-virus, destroying all electric systems. A predominant story in the episodes follows Jac and former Holby City character Connie Beauchamp (Amanda Mealing), who appears in Casualty, saving the lives of colleagues after two separate major incidents, despite only having one available theatre. Harper described the episode as "pure, nail-biting, taut, emotional medical drama". He also praised the production teams of both shows for their logical creation of the episodes, and looked forward to exploring the interactions between the characters from the two shows.

Twelve Holby City regular cast members - Marcel (Jac Naylor), Barrett (Sacha Levy), Quarshie (Ric Griffin), Guy Henry (Henrik Hanssen), Catherine Russell (Serena Campbell), Alex Walkinshaw (Adrian "Fletch" Fletcher), Kaye Wragg (Essie Di Lucca), Jaye Jacobs (Donna Jackson), Marcus Griffiths (Xavier "Xav" Duval), Nic Jackman (Cameron Dunn), Camilla Arfwedson (Zosia Self), and Belinda Owusu (Nicky McKendrick) - appear in the Casualty episode of the crossover, originally broadcast on 2 March 2019, alongside the cast of Casualty. The Holby City episode of the crossover, episode 10 of this series, features the Holby City cast alongside nine Casualty regular cast members: Mealing (Connie Beauchamp), Jason Durr (David Hide), Michael Stevenson (Iain Dean), Rebecca Ryan (Gem Dean), Neet Mohan (Rash Masum), Shaheen Jafargholi (Marty Kirkby), Jaye Griffiths (Elle Gardner), Tony Marshall (Noel Garcia), and Maddy Hill (Ruby Spark).

== Cast ==
=== Overview ===
The series began with 13 roles receiving star billing. Guy Henry portrays Henrik Hanssen, the chief executive officer of Holby City Hospital, the show's setting. Catherine Russell plays Serena Campbell, the hospital's medical director, the clinical lead of the Acute Assessment Unit (AAU) and a consultant in general surgery. Hugh Quarshie stars as Ric Griffin, a consultant general surgeon on the unit. Marcus Griffiths acts as Xavier "Zav" Duval, a general surgical registrar on the unit. Jaye Jacobs appears as Donna Jackson, the unit's senior staff nurse. Bob Barrett continues his role as Sacha Levy, a consultant general surgeon and the clinical lead of the general surgery ward, Keller. David Ames portrays Dominic Copeland, Keller ward's general surgical registrar. Kaye Wragg and Lee Mead play Essie Di Lucca and Ben "Lofty" Chiltern, respectively, both staff nurses on the ward. Rosie Marcel features in the series as Jac Naylor, a consultant cardiothoracic surgeon and the clinical lead of the cardiothoracic surgery ward, Darwin. Olga Fedori appears as Frieda Petrenko, a cardiothoracic registrar on Jac's firm. Belinda Owusu portrays Nicky McKendrick, an F2 doctor on Darwin ward, and Alex Walkinshaw stars as Adrian "Fletch" Fletcher, the director of nursing services, based on Darwin ward. Additionally, the semi-regular cast contains Jules Robertson, Zoe Croft and Briana Shann who star as porter Jason Haynes, his wife, Greta Allinson, and Donna's daughter, Mia Barron, respectively.

Episode 13 marks the departure of Frieda following Fedori's decision to leave her role, over one year after her return. The exit was not announced beforehand and was a surprise for the audience. In the narrative, Frieda leaves Holby to work for an aid organisation where she can "make a difference" after facing an "ethical dilemma" following a long-running struggle.

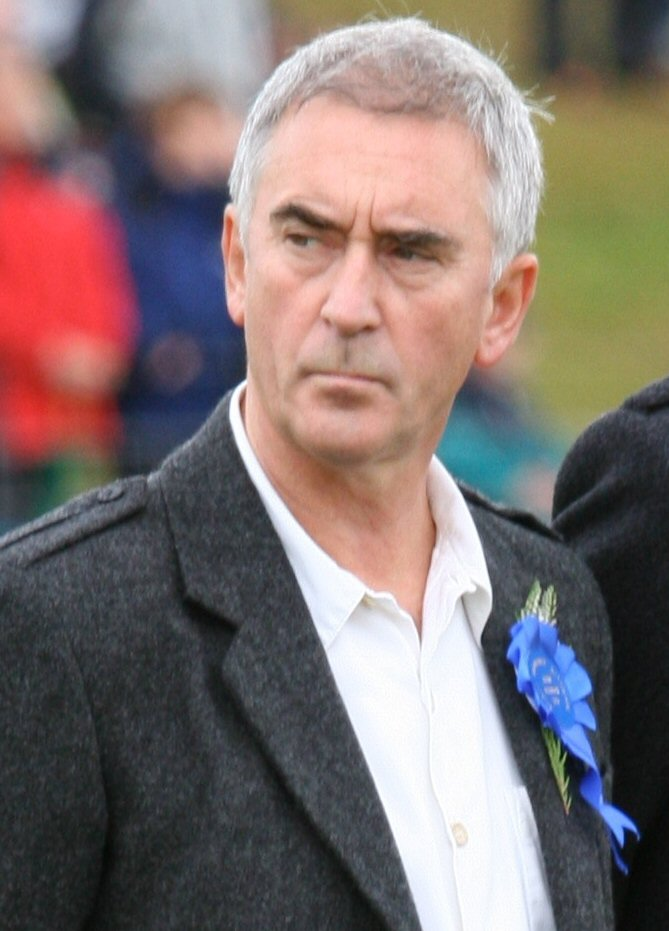
Denis Lawson reprises his role as Tom Campbell-Gore for the opening three episodes of the series.

On 19 September 2018, the returns of Camilla Arfwedson and Nic Jackman in their respective roles as cardiothoracic registrar Zosia March and F2 doctor Cameron Dunn were announced. Arfwedson returns for an extended guest stint between episode 8 and episode 16, now credited as Zosia Self. After previously making multiple guest appearances in the show, Jackman joins the regular cast upon his return in episode one. Both actors expressed their delight at reprising their roles. Harper confirmed in December 2018 that he was in discussions with other former cast members about returning during the series. That same month, it was confirmed that Sharon D. Clarke and Denis Lawson would reprise their roles of Lola Griffin, a locum consultant general surgeon, and Tom Campbell-Gore, a consultant cardiothoracic surgeon, respectively in the series. Lawson features in the opening two episodes of the series, and makes a cameo appearance in the third episode. Clarke appears in episode 3 for a single episode. Dom's mother, Carole Copeland (Julia Deakin), returns for a guest appearance in episode 7, before joining the semi-regular cast in episode 13. She becomes involved in a story arc about Dom discovering he is adopted and becomes a receptionist at the hospital. In March 2019, the returns of Marc Elliott and Debbie Chazen as Isaac Mayfield, a general surgical registrar and abusive partner of Dom, and Fleur Fanshawe, a consultant obstetrician, respectively, were announced. Fleur appears in episodes 16 & 28, and Isaac returns from episode 20. On 15 May 2019, it was announced that former cast members Patsy Kensit and Luke Roberts would reprise their roles during the series for a special episode. Kensit portrayed Faye Morton, a ward sister, for three years, while Roberts played Joseph Byrne, a cardiothoracic registrar, for five years. Both actors were excited about returning to film the episode, which Kensit called "gripping".

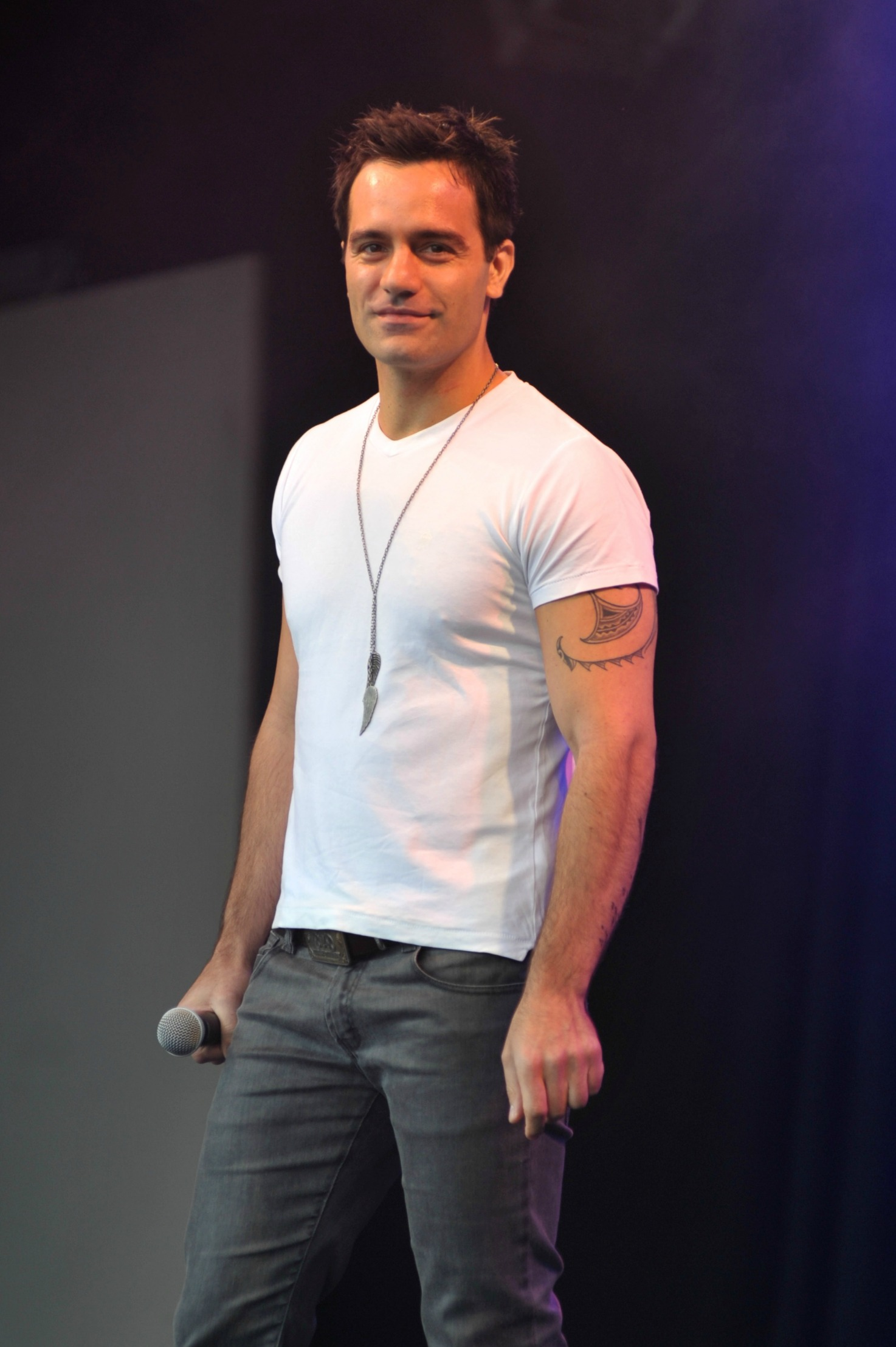
Ramin Karimloo joins the cast as Kian Madani in series 21.

Series 21 features the introduction of multiple new characters. Accredited actress Dawn Steele joined the cast as Ange Godard, a consultant pediatrician/general surgeon and the clinical lead of the young adult unit (YAU), a new unit that Ange opens in the hospital. Steele described Ange as "a great character with lots to tell". The character debuts in the second episode of the series. In November 2018, it was announced that Amy Lennox had been cast as Ange's daughter, Chloe Godard, a cardiothoracic registrar. Chloe first appears in episode five. It was also announced that Jack Ryder would be introduced as Chloe's on-off boyfriend, Evan Crowhurst, a locum registrar general surgeon. He first appears in episode 11. On 14 January 2019, it was announced that Ramin Karimloo had joined the regular cast as Kian Madani, a consultant cardiothoracic surgeon. Kian shares a backstory with Jac, having attended medical school with her. Karimloo described his character as "dynamic and exciting", while Harper commented, "it's already a joy seeing him stirring things up on Darwin".

The series features several recurring characters, and numerous guest stars. In November 2018, it was announced that Daisy Wood-Davis would appear in one episode of the series as Phoebe Palmer, the sister of Evan. Phoebe appears in episode 14. Sara Stewart stars in the opening episode as cardiothoracic consultant Professor Arianne Cornell, who clashes with Jac. The character previously appeared in an episode of series 20, as well as an episode of Casualty. A show trailer released in December 2018 confirmed guest returns for Patricia Ghraoui (Sirine Saba) and Roman Makarenko (Marko Leht). Roman appears in episode 4, which features the character's death. Patricia appears in episode 9, and was confirmed to be returning in another trailer released in March 2019. Patricia appears again in episode 22. Episode two features the appearance of actress Lorraine Chase in the role of former nurse Cherie Grimes. Television critic Sue Haasler called the character a "touching role" for Chase. Emma Curtis was cast as recurring character Holly Cartwright, a teenage patient involved in a storyline with Ange and Chloe. Holly's parents, Ruth Cooper (Marianne Oldham) and Michael Cartwright (Christopher Harper), were also introduced for the storyline. Holly first appears in episode 5, while Ruth is introduced in episode 6, and Michael debuts in episode 7. All three characters depart in episode 11 at the conclusion of the story.

As part of the crossover episode with Casualty, Francesca Barrett and Naomi Katiyo reprised their roles as Sacha's daughter, Beka Levy, and Ric's granddaughter, Darla Johnstone, respectively. Katiyo continued the role as part of a teenage pregnancy storyline. As part of the story arc, Richard Pepple guest stars in episode 11 as Darla's father, Kofi Johnstone. Fletch's son, Theo Fletcher (Stanley Rabbetts), returns for episodes 11 and 12, where he is kidnapped. Poppy Jhakra reprised her guest role as agency nurse Amira Zafar in episode 12, as did Suzette Llewellyn in the role of Xavier's mother, Nanette Duval. Having guest appeared in the previous series, Angela Lonsdale' character, "Scary" Sue Buchanan, was reintroduced for episodes 17 and 18 as the new clinical nurse manager of the AAU. Guest actor Geoff Leesley was cast in the role of Jon Mayfield, the father of Isaac, and appears from episode 21. Hamish Clark reprises his guest role as Ken Davies, a former patient and Jac's friend, in episodes 21 and 22. Episode 23 features the return of guest artist Dana Smit as Hanssen's daughter-in-law, Sara Johannsen, and the first appearance of child actor Harry Weston as Sara's son and Hanssen's grandson, Oskar Johanssen.

=== Main characters ===
- David Ames as Dominic Copeland
- Bob Barrett as Sacha Levy
- Olga Fedori as Frieda Petrenko (until episode 13)
- Marcus Griffiths as Xavier "Zav" Duval
- Guy Henry as Henrik Hanssen
- Nic Jackman as Cameron Dunn (from episode 1)
- Jaye Jacobs as Donna Jackson
- Ramin Karimloo as Kian Madani (from episode 17)
- Amy Lennox as Chloe Godard (from episode 5)
- Rosie Marcel as Jac Naylor
- Jo Martin as Max McGerry (from episode 42)
- Lee Mead as Ben "Lofty" Chiltern (until episode 51)
- Belinda Owusu as Nicky McKendrick
- Hugh Quarshie as Ric Griffin
- Catherine Russell as Serena Campbell
- Dawn Steele as Ange Godard (from episode 2)
- Alex Walkinshaw as Adrian "Fletch" Fletcher
- Kaye Wragg as Essie Di Lucca

=== Recurring characters ===
- Camilla Arfwedson as Zosia Self
- Charlie Condou as Ben Sherwood
- Zoe Croft as Greta Allinson
- Emma Curtis as Holly Cartwright
- Julia Deakin as Carole Copeland
- Marc Elliott as Isaac Mayfield
- Christopher Harper as Michael Cartwright
- Geoff Leesley as Jon Mayfield
- Angela Lonsdale as "Scary" Sue Buchanan
- Marianne Oldham as Ruth Cooper
- Jules Robertson as Jason Haynes
- Jack Ryder as Evan Crowhurst
- Sirine Saba as Patricia Ghraoui
- Briana Shann as Mia Barron
- Harry Weston as Oskar Johanssen

=== Guest characters ===
- Francesca Barrett as Beka Levy
- Paul Bradley as Elliot Hope
- Lorraine Chase as Cherie Grimes
- Debbie Chazen as Fleur Fanshawe
- Hamish Clark as Ken Davies
- Sharon D. Clarke as Lola Griffin
- Jane Crawshaw as Abigail Robins
- Jason Durr as David Hide
- Jaye Griffiths as Elle Gardner
- Maddy Hill as Ruby Spark
- Shaheen Jafargholi as Marty Kirkby
- Poppy Jhakra as Amira Zafar
- Naomi Katiyo as Darla Johnstone
- Patsy Kensit as Faye Morton
- Adam Kotz as Jonathan Robins
- Denis Lawson as Tom Campbell-Gore
- Marko Leht as Roman Makarenko
- Suzette Llewellyn as Nanette Duval
- Tony Marshall as Noel Garcia
- Amanda Mealing as Connie Beauchamp
- Neet Mohan as Rash Masum
- Richard Pepple as Kofi Johnstone
- Patricia Potter as Diane Lloyd
- Stanley Rabbetts as Theo Fletcher
- Luke Roberts as Joseph Byrne
- Rebecca Ryan as Gem Dean
- Dana Smit as Sara Johannsen
- Michael Stevenson as Iain Dean
- Sara Stewart as Professor Arianne Cornell
- Daisy Wood-Davis as Phoebe Palmer
