= A Simple Lie =

- Holby City episodes
- Episode nos.: Series 21; Episodes 11 & 12
- Directed by: Julie Edwards (Part 1); Nimer Rashed (Part 2)
- Written by: Patrick Homes
- Original air dates: 19 March 2019 (Part 1); 20 March 2019 (Part 2)
- Running time: 58 minutes (Part 1); 57 minutes (Part 2)

Guest appearances
- Stanley Rabbetts as Theo Fletcher; Richard Pepple as Kofi Johnstone; Naomi Katiyo as Darla Johnstone; Camilla Arfwedson as Zosia Self; Marianne Oldham as Ruth Cooper; Emma Curtis as Holly Cartwright; Christopher Harper as Michael Cartwright; Suzette Llewellyn as Nanette Duval; Jack Ryder as Evan Crowhurst; Poppy Jhakra as Amira Zafar

Episode chronology
← Previous "Powerless"	Next → "Running"
- Holby City (21

"A Simple Lie" is a two-part episode of the British medical drama Holby City that served as the 11th and 12th episodes of the show's twenty-first series, and the 966th and 967th episodes overall. The BBC rescheduled the planned broadcasts of the episodes due to a breaking news bulletin about the UK's Brexit negotiations, which aired 90 minutes before part one was due to air. The first part aired on 19 March 2019, and the second on 20 March 2019 on BBC One in the United Kingdom. Both parts were written by Patrick Homes and Julie Edwards directed the first episode and Nimer Rashed the second.

"A Simple Lie – Part One" focuses on the story of Holly Cartwright (Emma Curtis), a patient being aided by a life support system and that doctors have declared brain dead. Holly's parents Ruth Cooper (Marianne Oldham) and Michael Cartwright (Christopher Harper) do not consent to doctors ending her life. The hospital trust take the matter to court, where it is decided that life support must be withdrawn from Holly's care plan. The ordeal is observed outside the hospital by media and a group of right to life protesters. Consultant paediatrician Ange Godard (Dawn Steele) is Holly's main doctor and she becomes a target of the protester's anger and they attack her.

"A Simple Lie – Part Two" focuses on the continuing fall out of Holly's death and the abduction of Theo Fletcher (Stanley Rabbetts). His father Adrian "Fletch" Fletcher (Alex Walkinshaw) searches the hospital believing a protester has taken Theo in retaliation for Holly's death. The show's writers played a red herring as the mystery assailant is revealed to be disgruntled former employee Amira Zafar (Poppy Jhakra).

The episodes drew praise from television critics because of the emotional nature of Holly's storyline. Steele and Walkinshaw's performances were also praised for their emotional acting. The storyline was also compared by Steele and David Brown from the Radio Times to real-life incidents such as the 2017 Charlie Gard case. Both episodes were featured in various "pick of the day" features in television coverage magazines. The second episode also featured the introduction of Jack Ryder as surgeon Evan Crowhurst which generated media interest.

== Plot ==
=== Part one ===
The hospital prepares for trouble on the day of a court ruling over the removal of life support from the child patient Holly Cartwright (Emma Curtis). Holly's doctor consultant paediatrician Ange Godard (Dawn Steele) monitors Holly's condition while her parents Ruth Cooper (Marianne Oldham) and Michael Cartwright (Christopher Harper) wait anxiously. Ange reminisces about past conversations she had with Holly, which make her realise that she must be firm in her decisions. Outside right to life protesters picket the hospital entrance. Chief executive officer Henrik Hanssen (Guy Henry) receives news that the judge presiding the case has ordered that life support be removed from Holly. Ange informs Ruth and Michael, who agree to attend a press conference outside the hospital.

When Hanssen and Ange publicise the court ruling, Ruth decides to announce her intentions to appeal it. A protester throws tomato soup over Ange, who later convinces Ruth to consent to Holly's life support being removed. Hanssen updates the press with the news of Holly's death. Protesters jeer that Ange is the "Angel of Death" and nursing director Adrian "Fletch" Fletcher (Alex Walkinshaw) reacts angrily, telling the protesters off on the public platform, making himself a target for their anger. Following a series of death threats, Ange is given a police escort to a safe location. Fletch finishes his shift gets ready to leave with his son Theo Fletcher (Stanley Rabbetts). He talks to locum registrar Chloe Godard (Amy Lennox) at the car and Theo goes missing.

Consultant general surgeon Ric Griffin (Hugh Quarshie) deals with the admission of his granddaughter, Darla Johnstone (Naomi Katiyo). Darla is pregnant and Ric has to inform his son Kofi Johnstone (Richard Pepple). Kofi reacts angrily because of his strict Christian values and accuses Ric of meddling. Consultant Serena Campbell (Catherine Russell) expels Kofi from Darla's room for upsetting her. Kofi states that he turned to religion because he felt that Ric neglected him as a child. Ric convinces Kofi to support Darla, but she decides to move in with her grandfather.

Returning registrar Frieda Petrenko (Olga Fedori) is met by fellow registrar Zosia Self (Camilla Arfwedson), who wants to become acquainted with her. Darwin's clinical lead Jac Naylor (Rosie Marcel) forces the pair to work together, but they do not get along. Frieda is reluctant because she thinks Zosia mistreated her old love interest Oliver Valentine (James Anderson). Zosia explains that she still loves Oliver. While operating on a patient together they discover they have more in common and become friendly.

=== Part two ===
Fletch searches for Theo in the hospital basement and receives a message informing him that Theo's abduction is a retaliation over Holly's death. He is warned not contact the police so Fletch tells Hanssen they must conduct a search alone. They check the hospital's security cameras but fail to find who has taken Theo. Security guards block all exits to prevent Theo from being taken from the hospital grounds. Fletch becomes frantic and steals a surgical scalpel and starts kicking doors down in his search for Theo. Ange returns to the hospital and reviews security footage with Jac and Hanssen, where they identify the abductor as being nurse Amira Zafar (Poppy Jhakra), a disgruntled former employee from the hospital. They locate Amira on the roof and she explains she would not hurt Theo before letting him go. She blames Fletch for her past grievances with the hospital which lead to her dismissal. Amira reveals that following her dismissal she developed alcoholism and lost custody of her daughter. Ange realises she treated Amira previously and explains she has mental health problems. Amira is arrested and admitted into psychiatric care.

Nurse Donna Jackson (Jaye Jacobs) encounters Nanette Duval (Suzette Llewellyn) on AAU, she is the mother of registrar Xavier Duval's (Marcus Griffiths), who is also Donna's boyfriend. Nanette complains about a hand ailment which Donna does not take seriously. She and Nanette do not get along well but Donna tries her best to please Xavier. Donna assesses Nanette's hand and decides that she is okay and discharges her. Soon after Nanette returns to the ward in agony claiming her hand is now in severe pain which causes tension between Donna and Xavier.

When a man enters the Keller ward and startles Chloe, her colleague Dominic Copeland (David Ames) retrains him. Chloe reveals the man is her ex-boyfriend Evan Crowhurst (Jack Ryder). Evan is a general surgeon from Capel Cross Hospital. Evan asks Chloe to return to Capel Cross and resume their relationship. She reveals that Jac has offered her a permanent role on the cardiothoracic ward Darwin and she may accept. Evan helps diagnose Dominic's patient with a case of parasitic worms from working with livestock. Chloe and Dominic successfully operate on their patient thanks to Evan's help. Chloe then decides to stay at Holby City hospital, but Evan informs her that he will not give up on their relationship.

== Production ==
"It's similar to what happened in the 2017 case of little Charlie Gard in that Holly's parents are trying to fight for a life that physically isn't there any more. As with that case, the press have got hold of it, people are protesting and the hospital is under pressure."

— Dawn Steele, who plays Ange Godard, discussing the main story featured in the episodes. (2019)

"A Simple Lie" focuses on the culmination of Holly Cartwright's story, a brain-dead patient being kept alive by a life support system. Hospital staff decide that she is brain dead and want to remove her life support. Holly's parents Ruth and Michael fight the hospital board over her care and the matter is taken to court. The story had been developed over previous episodes, beginning in January 2019 when Holly was admitted to Holby City Hospital and Ange enlisted her daughter Chloe to assist on the case. Ange and Chloe encountered problems in the operating theatre which resulted in Holly sustaining brain damage. "A Simple Lie – Part One" focuses on the day of the court ruling and the trouble caused by right to life protesters that gather outside the hospital to jeer at and threaten staff members.

Ruth and Michael still believe that they can take Holly to the US for treatment, despite the court ruling that support must be removed. Steele told Victoria Wilson from What's on TV that the storyline is similar to the 2017 Charlie Gard case. She explained Holly's parents are fighting for life that is no longer present just like what happened in that case. She also noted that the subsequent press coverage of the case which generated protesters picketing the hospital also occurs in this fictional telling.

When Hanssen addresses the media and protesters about the court ruling, tensions escalate and a protester throws cold tomato soup over Ange. Steele explained that her character is a "strong woman, so she can cope, but it's still shocking." She added that when Fletch defends her, the crowd jeer at him calling Ange a murderer. Steele had to play Ange as an isolated figure in the incident, but added it was nice to have Fletch's support. The episode culminates in the revelation that protesters have leaked Ange's home address online. She is given a police escort as her safety is severely compromised.

"A Simple Lie – Part Two" continues the story directly from where the first episode ended. Fletch's son Theo goes missing and everyone presumes that he has been abducted by protesters. The mystery assailant threatens Fletch over messages not to involve the police. He searches for Theo armed with a surgical scalpel to attack them once he locates Theo. Ange leaves her safe house to help Fletch search. Steele said that her character feels responsible for bringing the protesters to the hospital and wants to help.

The episode was structured to make viewers believe it was a safe assumption to think a protester had taken Theo. Steele concluded that by the end of the episode "we soon find out that it's really not Ange's fault." Then came the surprise reveal that former agency nurse Amira has taken Theo. Ange manages to talk Amira down from the hospital roof and Theo is returned to safety. While Amira's involvement in Theo's abduction was a surprise for viewers, her involvement in the episode was known due to Jhakra being listed on an advance spoiler cast list.

The second part also features the introduction of a new character, general surgeon Evan Crowhurst played by Jack Ryder. Ryder's casting was announced in November 2018 and reported in the media due to Ryder's high profile because of his previous work. Ryder said that he was delighted to join the cast of Holby City. The show's producer Simon Harper revealed that he had been negotiating with the actor to appear on the show for a long time.

== Promotion and broadcast ==
External videos
- "Spring trailer 2019"; A promotional trailer featuring scenes from the episodes
- "Phone call" A preview clip for "A Simple Lie – Part Two"

"A Simple Lie" was first teased in a trailer publicised on 6 March 2019 which showcased the upcoming spring storylines. It previewed Theo's abduction, Darla's pregnancy dramas and relationship problems between Donna and Xavier. Advance episode stills were also released to promote Ryder's introduction into the series.

"A Simple Lie – Part One" was scheduled to air on BBC One on 12 March 2019 at 8 p.m. The broadcast was cancelled just hours before due to a breaking news bulletin, which was covering the fallout from the UK's Brexit negotiations. The coverage finished fifteen minutes before the episode would have aired. However, the BBC decided to put episodes of EastEnders and Would I Lie to You? on air instead. In the following days Kyle O'Sullivan from the Daily Mirror described the move as controversial, noting that many viewers were angry on social media. Both episodes were rescheduled to air on the 19 and 20 March 2019 respectively, in the 8 p.m. timeslot.

== Reception ==
"A Simple Lie – Part One" received praise from viewers because of its emotional content and many said that Holly's story upset them. Rose Hill from the Daily Mirror named Holly's life support story as "tragic events" and a "heartbreaking decision". Sasha Morris writing for the Daily Star opined that the dramatic events with the protesters "seemed to foreshadow the brutal ending". Helen Kelly of the Daily Express branded Holly's story as an "emotional case", Digital Spy's Sophie Dainty named it "the harrowing Holly Cartwright ordeal" and Victoria Wilson (What's on TV) called it "emotional trauma".

The Metro's Sue Haasler said that the protesters throwing soup over Ange should have been the end of the story, rather than escalating it further. She opined that Ange and Holly's flashback scenes would likely become more important in future episodes. The episode was featured in What's on TV's "Hot TV" picks of the week. It was also featured in the TVTimes "Tuesday highlights" feature and was given a three out of five star rating.

David Brown writing for the Radio Times compared the storyline to both the Charlie Gard and Alfie Evans case, as "vituperative protesters" descend on the hospital. He added that they think they know better than medical professionals when it comes to Holly's welfare. He also praised the episode's structure stating "to give the show credit, events do play out in a credible and, at times, moving way. And it's a fine example of soaps being able to take real-life headlines and then dramatise them in a relatively short period of time." He also noted that shows in other timeslots would take longer to be commissioned, while Holby City took on the story while it still felt relevant. Brown also heaped praise on Steele and Oldham's strong performances as Ange and Ruth.

Reviewing "A Simple Lie – Part Two", the Metro's Haasler praised Walkinshaw's performance as "desperate Fletch", adding that he proved what "a marvellous asset he is to the Holby cast." She branded Xavier and Donna's relationship as "delightful" but believed it "took a bit of a hit" during the episode, due to Nanette's behaviour. The Daily Star's Morris called the scenes between Donna and Nanette "very frosty". She added that her behaviour caused viewers on social media to fear that she is plotting to harm Donna. This episode was featured as one of the two main "Hot TV" picks of the week, chosen by staff from What's on TV. Richard Arnold writing for Woman's Own chose the episode in his "must watch TV" segment. He stated that Ryder's introduction proved he was still able to "get pulses racing" as Evan. It was featured in the TVTimes "Tuesday highlights" feature for Donna and Xavier's relationship dramas.

Sam Elliot (Daily Mirror), Michelle Townsend (RSVP Live) and a reporter from Heart all commented on Evan's debut, where they observed Ryder looking "unrecognisable" from his previous roles. Radio Times' Brown said that Evan made "quite the entrance" into the show. He also praised Walkinshaw's performance as the desperate Fletch. He opined that the actor portrayed the search "filled with a sense of palpable dread."
