= Jack Ryder (actor) =

English actor (born 1981)

- Born: Jack Siegfried Ryder; 21 September 1981 (age 44); Woolwich, South London, England
- Occupation: Actor
- Years active: 1998–present
- Spouse: Kym Marsh (m. 2002; div. 2009)
- Children: 1
- Parent: Jack Hues

Jack Siegfried Ryder (born 21 September 1981) is an English actor, best known for playing Jamie Mitchell in the BBC One soap opera EastEnders from 1998 to 2002.

== Early life ==
Ryder was born in Woolwich, London, in 1981. His father is Jack Hues (real name Jeremy Allan Ryder), the founder of 1980s New Wave band Wang Chung.

== Career ==
From 1998 to 2002, Ryder starred as Jamie Mitchell in EastEnders. Ryder found the scrutiny and attention difficult. In a 2026 interview, he opined,

"[EastEnders was] drawing in millions of viewers. But the fame side was hard to deal with and it was intense for me. I didn’t have any security, so I would turn up to events alongside boybanders who had full entourages, while I was on my own. I didn’t have other band members to lean on and I felt a bit on my own at times."

Upon leaving EastEnders in 2002, Ryder performed as Justin Timberlake on Celebrity Stars in Their Eyes (which he won), appeared in the pantomime Sleeping Beauty at the Marlowe Theatre in Canterbury and was cast in a recurring role on Five's Family Affairs which he pulled out of when he learned that the series was soon to be axed. In 2004, he played a role in the ITV crime drama MIT: Murder Investigation Team and appeared in a play broadcast on BBC Radio 4.

In 2006, Ryder starred in the British film Popcorn which was released in the spring of 2007. Ryder was due to become a regular character in the then-new ITV1 daytime series The Royal Today, a contemporary spin-off of The Royal, but he subsequently withdrew from playing the role.

In 2007, aged 26, Ryder appeared in the play The Safari Party by Tim Firth and in Kenneth Branagh's production of The Play What I Wrote which toured the UK extensively.

In spring 2008, he was in Christopher Luscombe's production of Alan Bennett's play Single Spies playing opposite Nigel Havers. Then Ryder played Romeo in Michael Bogdanov's production of Romeo and Juliet with Sara Lloyd-Gregory as Juliet.

In October 2008, Ryder joined The Archers as Ryan.

From 2009, Ryder played the photographer Laurence in the West End production of Calendar Girls at the Noël Coward Theatre, where he was also the assistant director.

In December 2010, Ryder wrote and directed his first short film, an adaptation of Mary Grace Dembeck's short story Act of Memory starring Claire Skinner, Owen Teale and Anna Massey which was shot on location in London and went on to be screened at the Cannes film festival in 2011.

In 2012, Ryder provided the English voiceover for Zael, the main protagonist in the video game The Last Story.

2013 saw Ryder become associate director of the stage play The Full Monty by Simon Beaufoy, which opened at the Lyceum Theatre Sheffield.

In 2014, Ryder directed his second short film DOG and in July 2015 directed his first red button episode of Casualty for the BBC.

Ryder continued his relationship with The Full Monty as the director of the new touring production starring Gary Lucy which toured the UK through the autumn of 2015 into 2017.

Ryder returned to acting and played a new character Gareth in Kay Mellors' BBC drama In the Club which aired in May 2016.

In 2017, Ryder became the assistant director to Tim Firth on his and Gary Barlow's new musical "The Girls," opening at the Phoenix Theatre in London's West End on 21 February. As a result of his work on "The Girls" and his success on "The Full Monty" Gary Barlow and Take That asked Ryder to become the codirector with Kim Gavin on their new musical "The Band" which opened in September 2017.

In November 2018, it was announced that Ryder would join the cast of Holby City as a new Consultant General Surgeon named Evan Crowhurst. He made his debut in the episode "A Simple Lie".

On 28 May 2020, Ryder published his debut novel, Jack’s Secret Summer with Hachette Children's Group.

== Personal life ==
Ryder married former Hear’Say singer turned actress Kym Marsh in St Albans, on 10 August 2002 and, after settling in St Albans, the couple had early difficulties and split for a short while before reconciling. In light of Marsh wanting regular roles in North West-produced dramas and to be closer to her family, the couple moved to Manchester in 2004. It was announced on 20 March 2008 that Marsh and Ryder had decided to separate and they subsequently divorced in 2009.

Ryder now lives in London and France. He is a supporter of Newcastle United F.C. On 28 May 2020, he announced that he and his girlfriend were expecting their first child. Their daughter was born the following year.

== Filmography ==
=== Film ===
Year	Title	Role	Notes
2007	Popcorn	Danny	
2011	Act of Memory: A Christmas Story	—N/a	Writer and director; short film
2021	Saving Conor	—N/a	Director; short film
2021	Mike's House	—N/a	Director; short film
2021	Kemi	—N/a	Director; short film
TBA	Semolina Pilchard	Des	

=== Television ===
Year	Title	Role	Notes
1998–2002	EastEnders	Jamie Mitchell	451 episodes
2000	The Boy in the Darkness	Titus Groan	Television film
2003	Dale's Wedding	Himself	Television film
2005	Murder Investigation Team	Sean Reynolds	Series 2 episode 3
2006	My Childhood: Kym Marsh	Himself	Television film
2012	The Hollow Crown	Court	Series 1 episode 8: Henry V, Part I
2012	Holby City	Sean Wells	Series 15 episode 3
2016	In the Club	Gareth	4 episodes
2019	Doctors	Grant Hill	2 episodes
2019	Holby City	Evan Crowhurst	17 episodes
2023	Silent Witness	Frank Turner	Series 23 :Familiar Faces Parts 1&2
2025	Unconventional	James Richard	Unaired pilot
