= Dermot Boyd =

Northern Irish-born television director

Dermot Boyd is a Northern Irish-born television director. Programmes he has directed include: The Return, Four Fathers, Feather Boy, Johnny and the Bomb, Drop Dead Gorgeous, Rough Diamond, Whistleblower, Casualty, Holby City and The Madame Blanc Mysteries. He is married to the writer Janet Behan. A further list of production credits can be found at the IMDb.
