= Frieda Petrenko =

- Holby City character
- Olga Fedori as Frieda Petrenko
- First appearance: "Together Alone"; 17 February 2010
- Last appearance: "Running"; 26 March 2019
- Portrayed by: Olga Fedori

In-universe information
- Occupation: Specialist registrar, cardiothoracic surgery; (prev. Ward sister; F1 doctor; F2 doctor)

Frieda Petrenko is a fictional character from the BBC medical drama Holby City, played by Olga Fedori. She first appears during the twelfth series episode "Together Alone", originally broadcast on 17 February 2010. Frieda was introduced as a nurse, before retraining as a foundation doctor. She departs during the fourteenth series episode "Wolf's Clothing", originally broadcast on 15 May 2012. Frieda guest stars in a series 17 episode, originally broadcast on 22 September 2015, as a patient diagnosed with tuberculosis. Fedori reprised the role again in 2017 and returns in the nineteenth series episode "We Need to Talk About Fredrik", originally broadcast on 12 December 2017. The actress quit the role a year later and Frieda departs in the twenty-first series episode "Running", originally broadcast on 26 March 2019. The character received critical acclaim and Fedori earned a nomination for Best Newcomer at the 16th National Television Awards.

== Storylines ==
Introduced as the cardiothoracic surgery ward's night shift sister, Frieda transfers to day shifts on the Acute Assessment Unit to cover the maternity leave of sister Chrissie Williams (Tina Hobley). Frieda has an initially antagonistic relationship with F2 doctor Penny Valentine (Emma Catherwood). When Penny learns that Frieda was a qualified doctor in her home country, Ukraine, she encourages her to retrain in the UK. Frieda resists the suggestion, but after being made redundant and having her diagnostic ability challenged by registrar Antoine Malick (Jimmy Akingbola), she decides to apply for an F1 position, which she achieves early in 2011. Throughout this series, Frieda and Penny grow closer, and Frieda’s affection turns from Penny’s brother, Oliver, to Penny herself. Frieda resolves to tell Penny her feelings, but on the morning she is going to confess, Penny is killed when the roof of a train collapses on her.

Frieda faces many difficulties in her F1 year, including the death of her father, which sees her return to Ukraine. When Frieda returns to Holby, she bonds with new colleague, senior nurse Eddi McKee (Sarah-Jane Potts), over their dislike of new F1 Lulu Hutchison (Fiona Hampton), a daddy's girl, who is determined to prove she is a better doctor than Frieda. Frieda overcomes this competition when Lulu is transferred to another hospital; but again leaves Holby to return to Ukraine. It is revealed that she returned to Ukraine as her former mentor, Lev Tereschenko (Andrew Franchuk), is ill with a serious heart condition. Whilst there, she works as waitress at a cafe. Frieda teams up with consultants Elliot Hope (Paul Bradley) and Michael Spence (Hari Dhillon) in order to save Lev. Afterwards, Elliot persuades her to return to Holby.

Frieda's return to Holby sees her struggle to adjust to working as a doctor and with new colleague, registrar Luc Hemingway (Joseph Millson). She is also under pressure to complete her F1 portfolio on time. Frieda fears that she has failed her F1 rotation when she is summoned to Henrik Hanssen's (Guy Henry) office, but is pleased to learn that she received the best score in the region and is now an F2, working on Keller ward. While working on Keller, Frieda finds herself caught between Dan Hamilton (Adam Astill) and Malick, who both want to supervise her on her first day. Frieda is later assigned the role of mentoring F1 Tara Lo (Jing Lusi), who temporarily comes from Darwin to work on Keller; although she finds her annoying at first the two eventually build up a good friendship. Frieda is offered a job at St Luke's due to her excellent F1 results, when Malick asks her if she is going to accept it, she throws the number of her potential new boss in the bin and resumes her work. When her clinical lead Ric Griffin (Hugh Quarshie) and new consultant Serena Campbell (Catherine Russell) place her in the middle of their feud at the expense of a patient, Frieda decides that enough is enough and leaves the hospital to work for a charity treating patients outside of the system.

Three years later, Frieda is admitted to the hospital as a patient with tuberculosis. She opens up to Elliot and Oliver Valentine (James Anderson) about blaming herself for her friend's death in Ukraine. She nearly dies and has to have emergency surgery, when Elliot struggles with the procedure, Jac Naylor (Rosie Marcel) saves her life.

== Development ==
=== Characterisation ===
From Ukraine, Frieda is a sardonic goth. She's as cynical as she is honest. Happy to take the night shift to avoid the politics and people that make life too complicated. She won't indulge egos and her bedside manner leaves a lot to be desired, but beneath it all, she does have a real compassion and vulnerability. She's unlikely to forge friendships with ease but when she does it's likely to be one she'll fight tooth and nail for.

— BBC Online

The official Holby City website describes Frieda as "sincere, compassionate, supportive [and] honest", but "self conscious, emotionally closed [and] sarcastic."

To prepare for the role, Fedori carried out some medical research. She also researched the goth subculture, as it is "far removed" from who she is. She admitted that there were moments where she felt that she had to do more research. Fedori also regularly spoke with the costume department about her character's wardrobe, commenting that it is "just constantly expanding." The actress felt Frieda was more defined compared to some characters she has played in the past and that she had longer to work on Frieda's "subtleties". She thought there were some similarities between herself and the character, explaining that she and Frieda were both straightforward people and not good at sugar-coating things. She also thought that she was nerdy like Frieda and enjoyed studying. In one storyline, Frieda is ordered to remove her goth make-up when a patient suffers an allergic reaction to it. Without her "mask", she loses her confidence. She later rallies after making a successful diagnosis, but ultimately decides that she needs to be herself and reapplies her eyeliner and lipstick.

Frieda is introduced as a nurse, but she soon decides to retrain as a foundation doctor and takes her F1 doctor's exams, which leads to a "crisis of faith". Frieda is distracted from opening her results when she treats fellow student doctor Jez Atkins (Jake Fairbrother), who is injured falling from his bike. Frieda's "fears are compounded" when she talks to Jez about the exams, but after diagnosing him with Crohn's disease, Frieda is called up to see CEO Henrik Hanssen (Guy Henry), who informs her that she has achieved the best results in the region.

=== Father's death ===
The character departed the series for a few episodes in series 13, as she travelled to Ukraine for her father's funeral. Series producer Myar Craig-Brown said that when she returns, Frieda has "more determination to focus on her job." She immediately forms a rivalry with F1 doctor Lulu Hutchinson, who "challenges" her. Frieda initially appears to be coping with her father's death, but she begins to find it harder to concentrate and avoids facing up to her emotions. Her colleague Sacha Levy is concerned when she struggles to deliver news of a patient's death to their family members. But Frieda soon insists on scrubbing in for surgery. Fedori commented, "There's a huge elephant in the room because of Frieda's grief."

She and Lulu compete for a chance to be part of the procedure, and Lulu tries flirting with Michael Spence to increase her chance of being chosen. Frieda is chosen to go into theatre, but when she is delayed, Lulu takes her place. When Frieda does finally get there, she realises she cannot handle the surgery and choose to step away. Fedori thought it was an important step for Frieda to admit that she is struggling. When asked by an Inside Soap writer if Frieda's softer side would emerge, Fedori replied "Oh, her character isn't going to change. She'll always be the type of person who says exactly what she thinks!"

=== Departure (2012) ===
On 18 April 2012, Daniel Kilkelly of Digital Spy reported that Fedori had filmed her final scenes as Frieda, and that she would depart during the following month. Of Fedori's exit, a spokesperson for the BBC stated "Olga has been a fantastic asset to Holby City and will be sorely missed by the cast and crew. Everyone wishes her all the best for the future." Consultant series producer Justin Young later revealed that Fedori had to leave the show quickly for personal reasons. Young also said that her character was beloved by the team, and he wished they had had the opportunity to make her exit bigger.

=== Returns ===
Frieda returned during the episode broadcast 22 September 2015. The show's series producer Simon Harper had remained in contact with Fedori. She emailed him to inform him that she wanted to return. Harper was planning Paul Bradley's exit as long-standing character Professor Elliot Hope from the series. He believed that Frieda's return was "brilliant timing" because it was a "treat" for viewers who would be upset by Elliot's departure.

On 4 October 2017, Kilkelly (Digital Spy) confirmed that Fedori had reprised the role for a six-month guest stint. Frieda will return in December, after Elliot asks her to work with Jac Naylor. Harper stated, "Frieda has a special place in the heart of the viewers, who I know will be as thrilled as I am to welcome her back to the wards. She's a familiar face back at the hospital at a time of change, with her trademark deadpan wit and unique outlook very much intact." He added that viewers should expect "fireworks" between Jac and Frieda, who does not want to be at Holby. Frieda returns in the nineteenth series episode "We Need to Talk About Fredrik", originally broadcast on 12 December 2017, as a qualified registrar who clashes with Jac.

=== Departure (2019) ===
On 26 March 2019, Frieda left the series after Fedori decided to quit the role. The character departs in the twenty-first series episode "Running". The exit was not announced beforehand and was a surprise for the audience. In the narrative, Frieda leaves Holby to work for an aid organisation where she can "make a difference" after facing an "ethical dilemma" following a long-running struggle.

== Reception ==
In 2011, Fedori was short-listed for the "Best Newcomer" award at the National Television Awards for her performance as Frieda. The award was ultimately won by EastEnders's Ricky Norwood. Ian Cullen of Monsters and Critics lamented Fedori's loss, opining that her performance in Holby City is hilarious. Frieda has received critical acclaim, with the Daily Mirror's Jim Shelley naming her the "best character on television". Shelley has included several of her one-liners in his regular "Soundbites of the Week" column, including her excuse: "I saw it in one of your Carry On films. I thought he might like it", delivered after inserting a sunflower into the rectum of a racist patient. Fellow Mirror critic Jane Simon has also praised Frieda, deeming her one of the series' most interesting characters. Simon describes her as a "fearless, straight talking [...] super-nurse", enjoying her ability to "liven up the place with her unlikely combination of ghoulish demeanour and slapstick sense of humour." When a 2011 storyline featured Frieda facing redundancy, Simon commented, "we would be gutted if she left. Her friendly scowl is one of the best things about the show."

Simon bemoaned Frieda's low-key exit, saying "Some staff members at Holby get massive exit storylines. Others [...] are out of the door before you realise they're going. And that's the case again tonight with our very favourite Ukrainian goth nurse turned junior doctor – Frieda Petrenko. One minute she's making an impassioned speech about patient care, the next we're told she's chucked in her job. Just like that." Justin Harp of Digital Spy called Frieda's second exit "emotional" and "heartbreaking".
