= Joe Ainsworth =

English screenwriter

Joe Ainsworth is an English screenwriter. He has written 150+ episodes of the British soap opera Brookside.

== Career ==
He has also written for And the Beat Goes On, The Lakes, Mayo, Merseybeat and Holby City. His episode of Holby City, titled "Past Imperfect" won a BAFTA award for best continuing drama. He was part of the regular writing team on Holby City from 2004 to 2022 and has contributed 75 scripts making him the serial's most prolific writer. In 2020, Hurricane Films announced it was developing The Last Bus and The Last Date, written by Ainsworth.

== Honours ==
Ainsworth studied English at Edge Hill College from 1986, graduating in 1989. There is a Halls of Residence called Ainsworth in his honour. In July 2021 he was made an Honorary Doctor of Literature (HonDLitt) by the university.
