= Olga Fedori =

Ukrainian actress

- Born: Olga Victorivna Fedorishcheva; 17 March 1984 (age 41); Ukrainian SSR, USSR
- Education: Harvard University
- Occupation: Actress
- Years active: 2004–present

Olga Victorivna Fedorishcheva (Ukrainian: Ольга Вікторівна Федоріщева, romanized: Ol'ha Viktorivna Fedorishcheva; born 17 March 1984), known as simply Olga Fedori, is a Ukrainian actress who works in English language films and programmes. She is best known for portraying Frieda Petrenko in the BBC medical drama Holby City from 2010 to 2012 and again from 2017 to 2019.

== Early life ==
Fedori was born in Ukraine, where she studied international relations and law at Donetsk National University. During her first year of university, she participated in a study abroad program in Neosho County, Kansas, studying at Neosho County Community College (NCCC). After finishing her first year at NCCC, Fedori transferred to Harvard University in Cambridge, Massachusetts. While a Harvard student, Fedori performed at the American Repertory Theater and other theaters in Boston. Fedori graduated from Harvard in 2004, and began working in Off-Broadway productions in New York City. In addition to her acting career, Fedori also performed as the frontwoman of the band ICIA in London from 2006 to 2008.

== Acting career ==
Fedori appeared in The Adventure of Earthboy and Stargirl in the title role as Stargirl in 2006. In 2007, she appeared in British television shows Skins, in which she played Anka in the sixth episode and EastEnders, playing Anya Covalenco.

She appeared as the leading female character Scarlett in the short film Birdfeeder which premiered in Brighton on 2 May 2007.

On 21 June 2008 at the Edinburgh International Film Festival, her first feature Mum & Dad, in which she plays the lead–protagonist Lena, premiered at the Filmhouse.

She appears briefly in the 2010 movie The Wolfman, in which she plays Maleva's daughter.

She first appeared in the BBC One medical drama Holby City on 12 May 2010, portraying the character of Frieda Petrenko, a Ukrainian nurse and later doctor (Fedori had to emphasise her Ukrainian accent for the part), and was shortlisted for the "Best Newcomer" award at the 2011 National Television Awards for the role. She left the series on 15 May 2012, returning on 12 December 2017.

She played Tatiana Romanova in the BBC Radio 4 adaptation of Ian Fleming's 1955 James Bond novel From Russia, With Love opposite Toby Stephens as Bond. The play was narrated and directed by Martin Jarvis.

== Filmography ==
Year	Title	Role	Notes
2006	The Adventure of Earthboy and Stargirl	Stargirl	Short film; credited as Olga Fedorishcheva
2007	Skins	Anka	Episode: "Maxxie and Anwar"
2007	The Goldfish	Alexa	Short film
2007	EastEnders	Anya Covalenco	4 episodes
2007	Maxwell	Irina	
2007	Bird Feeder	Scarlet	Short film
2008	Trial & Retribution	Sofia	Episode: "The Rules of the Game: Part 1"
2008	Mum & Dad	Lena	
2009	Doctors	Ania Mironov	Episode: "Arranged Family"
2009	Get to Know Me	Sara	Short film
2009	Signal from Shore	Katherina Volkova	Short film
2010	The Wolfman	Young Gypsy Woman	
2010–19	Holby City	Frieda Petrenko	Main role; 100 episodes
2016	The Surrogate	The Surrogate	Short film
2018	Quadraturin	Lady O	Short film
2018	Nika	Nika	Short film
