= Veil of Tears – Part One =

- Holby City episode
- Zosia and Oliver marry in front of their family and friends
- Episode no.: Series 19; Episode 50
- Directed by: Jan Bauer
- Written by: Joe Ainsworth
- Original air date: 19 September 2017
- Running time: 58 minutes

Guest appearances
- John Michie as Guy Self; Aaron Fontaine as Freddie Chapel; Christopher Goh as Nicholas 'Nick' Yang; Diana Kent as Blanche Valentine; Rian Gordon as Russell Johnston; Jenny Howe as Alexandra ‘Lexy’ Dunblane

Episode chronology
← Previous "The Man Who Sold the World"	Next → "Veil of Tears – Part Two"
- Holby City series 19

"Veil of Tears – Part One" is the fiftieth episode of the nineteenth series of the British medical drama television series Holby City. The episode was written by Joe Ainsworth and directed by Jan Bauer, and premiered on BBC One on 19 September 2017. The episode features the wedding of established characters Zosia March (Camilla Arfwedson) and Oliver Valentine (James Anderson), who both work on the show's fictitious Darwin ward. It formed the first of a two-part collective of episodes leading up to Arfwedson's departure from the series. The episode also featured Zosia's father Guy Self (John Michie) ruining her wedding day, getting drunk and falling on a shard of glass. Other characters battle in the operating theatre to save his life. While registrar Dominic Copeland (David Ames) and nurse Ben "Lofty" Chiltern (Lee Mead) sleep together forming part of their ongoing gay storyline.

Location filming was done at Brocket Hall, a Grade I-listed classical English country house. Arfwedson described the episode as "such a romantic episode" and said that it was a fun process to create. The episode was promoted by the BBC with trailers airing on their website and televised segments on BBC1. The episode was watched by 4.3 million people during the BBC One airing.

== Plot ==
The episode follows the wedding day of ST3 doctor Zosia March (Camilla Arfwedson) and registrar Oliver Valentine (James Anderson). Zosia's father Guy Self (John Michie) attends a meeting with CEO Henrik Hanssen (Guy Henry) and medical director Nina Karnik (Ayesha Dharker). They inform him that Guy is suspended for being under the influence of alcohol in the operating theatre. Nina asks consultant cardiothoracic surgeon Jac Naylor (Rosie Marcel) to review all medical cases involving Guy to find possible errors. Nina then orders Jac to send a patient home waiting for a pioneering cosmetic procedure. She argues that the hospital is short staffed, needs beds and no negative attention. Nina talks to the patient and changes her mind, opting to assist Jac on the operation.

Guy attends the wedding venue where he tries to make amends with Zosia. She initially forgives him, but orders him to leave when she realises he is manipulating her. Zosia's best friend, registrar Dominic Copeland (David Ames), walks her down the aisle and she marries Oliver. Guy drinks a bottle of whisky and destroys the wedding cake. He proceeds to make speech criticising his daughter and ruining their reception. Nurse Ben "Lofty" Chiltern (Lee Mead) puts Guy in a guest room to sleep, but Guy smashes glasses and bottles in the room.

Dom's boyfriend Freddie Chapel (Aaron Fontaine) complains that the wedding is boring and abruptly leaves. An upset Dom is mean to Lofty who offers his support. He later goes to Lofty's room to apologise and kisses him. The pair sleep together unaware of trouble unfolding outside. Zosia finds Guy unconscious in the guest room. He has taken an overdose and fallen on a shard of glass. He is rushed to hospital where Jac and Nina battle to save his life. They manage to resuscitate him and remove the shard of glass. He has to have his spleen removed and is stabilised. Oliver tries to comfort Zosia who seems disinterested in him, as she sits by her father's bedside.

== Production ==
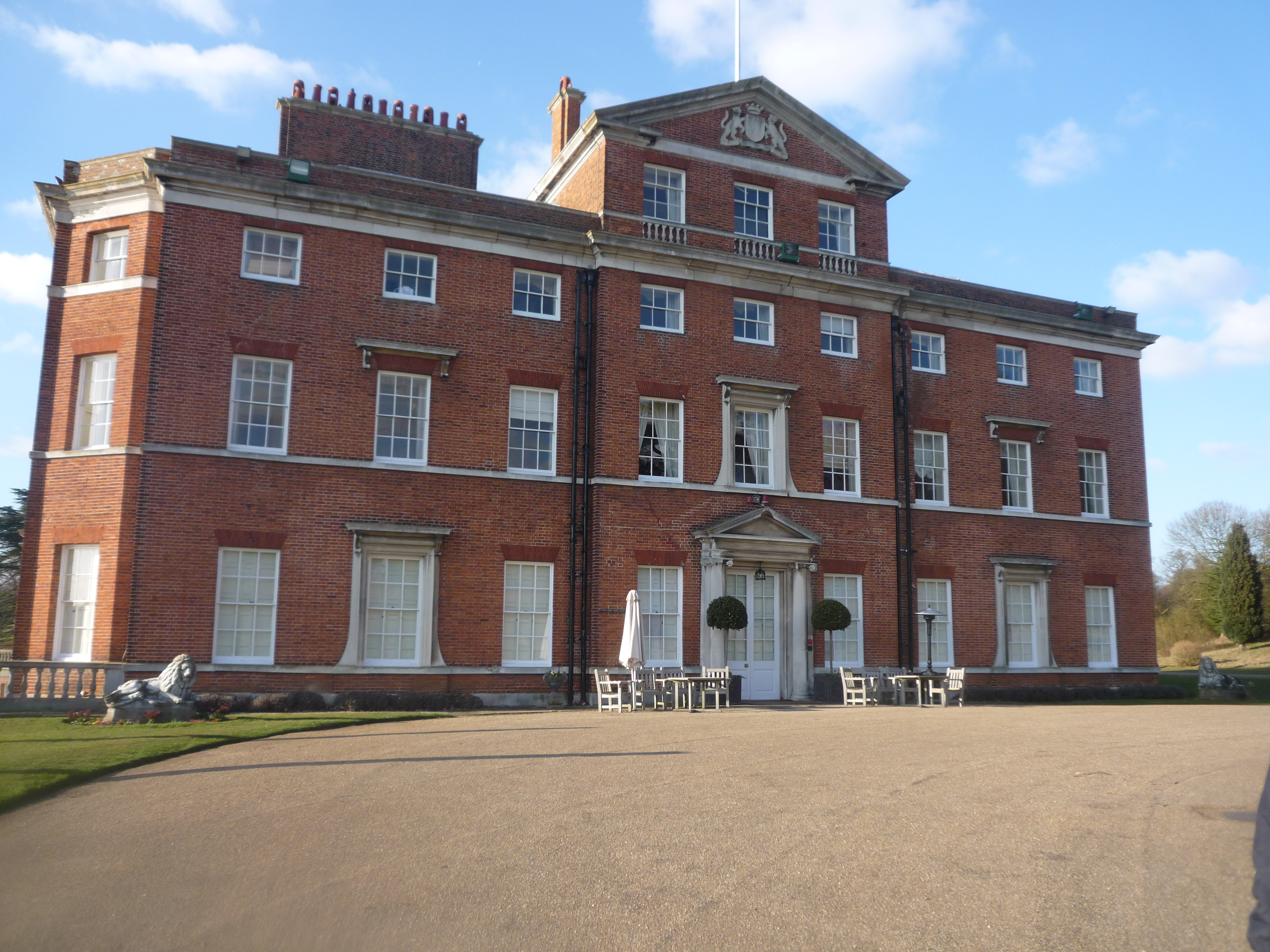
The episode features scenes filmed at Brocket Hall.

The episode features Zosia and Oliver's wedding as the main story. The episode was highly anticipated by fans of the two characters. Arfwedson believed viewers were "terribly excited" because they wanted the pair finally achieve happiness together following difficult times. Holby City producer Kate Hall told Daniel Kilkelly from Digital Spy that "the 'Zollie' wedding is a fascinating story about a young woman, the pressures she has faced through her diagnosis, and the very complex relationship she has with her father."

"Veil of Tears – Part One" was written by Joe Ainsworth and directed by Jan Bauer. Zosia and Oliver's wedding was filmed on location at Brocket Hall, a Grade I-listed classical country house set in a large park near Hatfield in Hertfordshire, England. Of her experience of filming there, Arfwedson told Sarah Ellis from Inside Soap that "it was so much fun and such a romantic episode." Lee Mead who plays Lofty was written into the episode. The actress also found it strange that he was attending her character's wedding when she had never worked with Mead on-screen before. In addition Anderson found filming the wedding scenes to be "weird" because he was about to marry in real life. He married off-screen within twenty-four hours of the episode being broadcast.

Arfwedson told Victoria Wilson from What's on TV that the episode features her character as "quite a lonely figure, pacing around this grand house". This is because she has cancelled many of the wedding guests' invitations due to her argument with Guy. The episode was also one of a two-part collective of episodes, with the following episode titled "Veil of Tears – Part Two". These episodes formed the lead up to Arfwedson's departure from the series. The actress told What's on TV that it was "nice to have this big wedding" episode leading to her exit. She described filming the two parts as "very full on and quite exhausting".

== Promotion ==
In August 2017, Hall stated that the episode would be one of the show's "biggest of the year". She praised all the main cast's acting performance in the episode and promoted it as "a brilliant, brilliant episode." On 5 September 2017, scenes from the wedding were publicised via a trailer previewing the show's stories due to air in late 2017. The show's official website later released a teaser trailer featuring scenes involving Jac and Nina to promote the episode. The BBC also aired a televised trailer to promote the episode. It was broadcast on 19 September 2017 on BBC One in the United Kingdom.

== Reception ==
The episode was watched by 4.33 million people during the BBC One airing. Twenty-eight days later, the episode's rating continued to increase, to a new total of 4.52 million viewers. "Veil of Tears – Part One" saw a decrease of 30,000 viewers in the overall rating figures from the previous episode. The following episode decreased to 4.32 million viewers. TVTimes included the episode in their "pick of the day" feature and gave it a three star rating. Their reporter opined "it's Oliver and Zosia's big day! Well, when we say big day, we mean a rather pitiful affair with just a handful of guests and no string quartet, photographer, bad disco or drunk bridesmaids." A What's on TV reporter branded it a "nightmare wedding" and said that Guy made it "one to remember - for all the wrong reasons." Another said it was their "wedding nightmare" and "Zosia certainly doesn’t look like a woman about to marry the man of her dreams. A reporter from Soaplife included it in their "Must see TV" feature. Olivia Wheeler from OK! wrote "like any good soap wedding, the two characters' big day was thrown into chaos when Zosia's dad, CEO Guy Self – played by John Michie, got drunk and crashed the reception." Digital Spy's Kilkelly branded the wedding episode as "eventful". A writer for the Inside Soap Yearbook 2018 included the ceremony in their "Wedding Gloom" feature for the month of September. They observed, "Zosia and Ollie's wedding was thrown into disarray when her unhinged father, Guy, turned up and tried to stop the ceremony!"
