= Holby City series 19 =

Season of television series

Holby City
- Series 19
- No. of episodes: 64

Release
- Original network: BBC One; BBC One HD
- Original release: 11 October 2016 – 19 December 2017

Series chronology
- ← Previous; Series 18 Next → Series 20

The nineteenth series of the British medical drama television series Holby City commenced airing in the United Kingdom on BBC One on 11 October 2016 and concluded airing in the United Kingdom on BBC One on 19 December 2017. The series consists of 64 episodes; an increase from the previous series.

== Episodes ==
No. overall	No. in series	Title	Directed by	Written by	Original release date	Viewers (millions)
840	1	"Into the Abyss"	Steve Brett	Ailsa Macaulay	11 October 2016	4.45
A hungover Jasmine works on a patient with Ric and Sacha, but when she starts getting personally involved with the patient she is called off the case by Ric. At the same time Tristan returns to Keller to check up on the ward. Jasmine speaks with Tristan and tells him she feels as though Ric is intimidating. Tristan reports Jasmine's claims to Hanssen and Ric is suspended. Elsewhere, Zosia initially struggles to connect emotionally with a patient who is terminally ill after he reminds her of Arthur. Raf is shortlisted for a surgeons scheme and Serena encourages him to progress with his career, but a female patient makes him question whether he should put his life before his job.
841	2	"Rocket Man"	Steve Brett	Peter Mattessi	18 October 2016	4.86
Zosia becomes determined to save a theatre on Darwin when Tristan voices his plans to remove one of the theatres from the ward. She works with Jac on a patient, but blood test results reveal the patient is not related to her father. Zosia accidentally reveals the news of the blood test results to her patient, and later puts her career in danger after she defies Jac during the operation. Jac later realises Zosia has not been treating her bipolar properly. Elsewhere, Essie becomes suspicious over a patient who is readmitted for the second day in a row after another fall, while Morven bonds with a flirtatious patient.
842	3	"Black Dog"	James Bryce	Patrick Homes	25 October 2016	4.79
Hanssen receives a phone call from Sweden asking him to return home as the CEO of the hospital out there has died. He initially refuses to travel back to Sweden and calls Jac in to his office, asking her to and attend the funeral on his behalf, but when Jac reminds him that the CEO of the Swedish hospital raised his son, Hanssen realises it is time to return home. Meanwhile, on AAU Imelda Cousins returns to assess Serena's ability to run the ward, but it later transpires Imelda has epilepsy after suffering an absence seizure. Jac reveals to Ollie that Zosia is planning on moving hospitals, forcing Ollie to realise that it is Zosia he wants to be with, while Jasmine's lies land her in even more trouble, and she faces the possibility of losing her job if she tells the truth, ultimately leading to Hanssen covering for her.
843	4	"Somebody to Love"	James Bryce	Ed Sellek	1 November 2016	4.55
Guy helps Tristan out when his partner, Jemima, is admitted after suffering a head injury. Zosia becomes suspicious when it appears Jemima has been admitted under a different name, she has bruises on her arm and her previous medical records show she has been admitted several times with similar injuries. Morven becomes overconfident after saving a patient in a trauma case, and when the patient she has begun to develop feelings for is readmitted, Raf questions whether Morven is treating the patient for the right reasons. Meanwhile, Isaac becomes annoyed with Dom's living habits, and when he learns that a letter informing him that he had a surgeon's scheme interview got mixed up in Dom's post, Isaac and Dom's relationship becomes strained.
844	5	"Song of Self – Part One"	Paulette Randall	Kate Verghese	8 November 2016	4.72
A confident Guy prepares for the construction of his new neurosurgical ward, but he soon finds himself distracted by Jemima, who is readmitted onto Darwin after being hit by a car outside the hospital. When Jasmine reports to Guy that Jemima told the driver of the car to let her die, Guy asks Jemima why she is still in her abusive relationship with Tristan, but then it becomes apparent, Tristan raped Jemima, who is now pregnant with his baby. Guy is then given another shock when Jemima agrees to marry Tristan. Zosia later learns Jemima was raped and prepares to help Jemima flee the country, until Tristan finds Zosia trying to take Jemima's passport. Tristan then begins strangling Zosia, until she manages to get hold of a glass block and hit him over the head with it. Elsewhere, a paranoid Jasmine impresses Ric when she diagnoses a patient with dementia pugilistica.
845	6	"Song of Self – Part Two"	Paulette Randall	Kate Verghese	15 November 2016	4.42
Zosia remains in shock following the night's events. Ollie returns to the hospital to find her in the staff room and prompts her to call the police about the incident. At the same time, Guy is asked to operate on Tristan. He does, unaware Tristan attempted to rape her. After the operation, Guy learns what Tristan did to Zosia. Guy prepares to take Tristan to the police, but is threatened by Tristan who explains that he knows all about Guy's past – and how he attempted to commit suicide years ago. Jac calls the police and they arrive, but Tristan dies from a bleed on the brain shortly before he is interviewed. Zosia has the charges against her dropped after Jemima speaks up about her ordeal, while following the night's events, Guy decides to hand in his resignation and leave to start a new career and a new life.
846	7	"The Kill List"	Toby Frow	Jeff Povey	22 November 2016	4.81
Isaac is given a research grant by Ric, and is told that he needs to pick an assistant to help him with his research. A competitive Dom and Jasmine go head-to-head to win the assistant post, as Dom sabotages the other participants opportunity, while Jasmine composes a file with her ideas for the research grant. When Dom realises the battle for the post is finally between him and Jasmine, he sabotages Jasmine's file. Jasmine realises Dom's intentions and is irritated by his actions, until she is given the role of research assistant. Isaac later tells Dom he wants them to be together again. Elsewhere, Bernie returns from Ukraine, but Jason misinterprets Serena and tells Bernie she has moved on. As the pair's relationship remains strained, Jason and Fletch lock the pair in Serena's office and they reconcile, while Inga becomes paranoid over Mo and Derwood's friendship, and ends up lying to Derwood, telling him she is pregnant.
847	8	"Parasite"	Toby Frow	Simon Norman	29 November 2016	4.30
Jac is unimpressed by the late arrival of new locum cardiothoracic surgical consultant Matteo Rossini, who arrives at the hospital on a horse with a patient. Frustrated by Matteo's enthusiasm and artificial charm, Jac begins putting Matteo in his place, until he tells her he is not threatened by her. However, it is later Jac who has the upper hand when she discovers Matteo was sold the Digby stent from Guy, and used her device off as his, resulting in the Digby stent's downfall. Elsewhere, Bernie is surprised by the return of her son, Cameron, who reveals he is restarting his foundation year as a doctor. Both Serena and Bernie are impressed by Cameron's ability when he diagnoses a patient with a rare condition, while on Keller, Dom exposes a patient's lies to his friend.
848	9	"Glass Houses"	Jan Bauer	Johanne McAndrew and Elliot Hope	6 December 2016	4.77
Jac learns she has an ovarian cyst and Derwood is concerned. He advises she has an operation to remove the cyst, but Jac refuses surgery, and instead focuses on her patient, who happens to be Alister Maconie. Jac realises Alister needs an operation if he does not want to be at risk of a heart-lung transplant, but before she is able to perform surgery she collapses and is rushed into theatre. Jac survives surgery and begins her recovery. Meanwhile, Raf spends the day on Keller. His patient is Parker, who has been admitted after vomiting blood. He discovers that Kim's medical condition has affected him, and suggests Parker spends some time away from his mother, leading to Essie suggesting he moves in with her temporarily. On AAU, Fletch befriends a vulnerable and lonely patient, but soon discovers he is a gambler.
849	10	"Hallelujah"	Jan Bauer	Becky Prestwich and Nick Fisher	13 December 2016	4.40
Essie prepares herself as the day for Parker to return home arrives. She finds Tramadol in Kim's bag, and believes Kim is drug abusing again, but Kim reassures her that she hasn't relapsed. With Kim's liver function also improving, she is told she can return home, resulting in Essie ordering more unnecessary tests on Kim in a desperate attempt to stop Parker from returning home, although Essie soon realises it is time to let Parker go. On AAU, Morven undertakes her new role as a Foundation Doctor teacher, but struggles to get the hang of balancing discipline and praise. Meanwhile, on Darwin, Matteo tells Ollie he is planning to ask Zosia out on a date. Realising he still has not gotten over Zosia, Ollie is forced to confront his feelings once more – which results in the pair sharing a kiss.
850	11	"The Nightmare Before Christmas"	David Tucker	Katie Douglas	20 December 2016	4.66
Jac returns to work and focuses her mind on her patients as the day of her test results arrive. She learns Matteo has taken over her patients in her absence, and so prevents him from performing surgery for the day, inviting Sacha onto the ward to help her out instead. Sacha learns Jac has been avoiding finding out the results of the biopsy on her ovaries, and so helps her open her results with him, which come back clear. On Keller, Lee returns to the wards fearing his bowel cancer has returned. Dom finds himself in a difficult situation as Lee tells Dom he still loves him, but Dom resists Lee's charms and focuses his relationship with Isaac. However, after Jasmine accidentally deletes all of Isaac's research for his project they were working on, a furious Isaac fires her, before telling Dom their relationship is over and standing on and breaking Arthur's medals.
851	12	"Just Get on with It"	David Tucker	Simon Norman	27 December 2016	4.55
Essie treats a patient with hepatitis C in need of a liver transplant, but her job is made difficult when bloods come back revealing he has HIV. She later learns that her patient has also been abusing alcohol, but realising how much he wants a new liver, Essie prepares to lie on his transplant form, until she is caught out by Raf. On AAU, after being kicked off Darwin and then Keller, it is Jasmine's last chance at Holby. She treats a patient successfully, but later loses her temper when her patient is racist towards a foreign patient. Serena tells Jasmine her actions were unnecessary, but decides to take no further action and welcomes Jasmine to the ward. At the same time, Elinor arrives on AAU filming the ward as part of her documentary. Elsewhere, Isaac decides to twist his latest argument with Dom, and tells Dom he has forgiven him for his tantrum, while on Darwin, Mo and Derwood kiss.
852	13	"I Do, I Do, I Do"	Dermot Boyd	Michelle Lipton	3 January 2017	5.16
Mo arrives at Derwood and Inga's wedding and is surprised to see Hanssen has returned as best man for their wedding. Derwood and Inga get married, and at the reception he announces Inga's pregnancy to the guests. Mo realises something is up with Inga when she does not react to Derwood's news, and when Mo visits Inga outside, Inga reveals she is not pregnant. Mo tells Inga's secret to Derwood's mother, who then reveals Inga's lie to the whole wedding reception, leaving Derwood heartbroken. Later at the wedding, Mo's waters break and, just before giving birth, Mo tells Derwood he is the father of her baby. Elsewhere, Elinor accidentally runs Jason over when she clashes with Serena. As Jason is rushed off to surgery, Elinor refuses to be checked over, which later results in her falling unconscious in the toilets and an emergency operation being performed in an attempt to save her life. Serena is left devastated when Bernie reveals Elinor is almost dead, and advises her to call Edward back to say his goodbyes.
853	14	"Aces High"	Jennie Darnell	Joe Ainsworth	10 January 2017	4.73
Jac is impressed with Ollie when he pitches a tempting funding project for Darwin. However, when Matteo overhears the pair talking about the project, he decides to write up a rival pitch. Jac reads Matteo's proposed pitch and immediately throws it in the bin after realising he has used the Digby stent and just altered parts of the device. Jac tells Matteo she has no intention of looking at his plan, until Matteo manages to slyly convince her to read the project again. Later, Jac tells Ollie she is using Matteo's pitch instead, outraging Ollie and making him feel undermined once again. Meanwhile, Dom's parents arrive on Keller. He tries to keep his relationship with Isaac a secret, but Carole soon notices something is up with the pair. Elsewhere, on AAU, Cameron finds himself fighting his feelings for Morven on his last day at Holby City.
854	15	"Stick or Twist"	Jennie Darnell	Joe Ainsworth	18 January 2017	4.27
Fletch is reunited with Artem on AAU when he returns with injuries to his face. Fletch is surprised by the cash Artem has on him, but he and Bernie are soon concerned for Artem after discovering a large abdominal aortic aneurysm. Bernie originally refuses to operate on Artem, but later decides to operate on Artem after he asks to be operated on. Fletch awaits for Artem to return, but Bernie tells Fletch that Artem died in theatre, and that he has left Fletch the gambling money he has won: £100,000. Elsewhere, on Darwin, Jac and Matteo tiptoe around each other throughout their shift, and end up sharing a kiss. Over on Keller, Sacha learns that Essie and Raf are planning a weekend away together, although he later receives a bigger shock when he collapses in theatre from an infected abscess.
855	16	"Daylight"	Karl Neilson	Gareth Sargeant and Patrick Homes	24 January 2017	4.89
Mo and Derwood return to Holby and tell the Darwin team they are planning on moving to Sweden. Jac tells Mo that if she leaves she will struggle to return as a surgeon, but Mo does not initially listen, until she becomes emotionally involved in a patient and later realises she belongs on Darwin. At the same time Mo and Derwood clash over the name of their son, Charlston, and decide to rename him Hector. On Keller, Dom believes him and Isaac are going away to Hawaii on holiday, but Dom is shocked when he realises that Isaac is expecting him to work for his place to go on holiday with him on a research trip. Dom is angered by Isaac's latest actions, resulting in Isaac and Jez having a one-night stand. On AAU Fletch and Morven with a young patient using silicon to enhance his body.
856	17	"Of Lions and Lambs"	Karl Neilson	Patrick Homes	31 January 2017	4.85
Serena returns to work in search for answers of Elinor's death, but when she fails to find any, Jasmine finds herself in the firing line of Serena's grief and anger as it becomes apparent she is struggling to cope in the aftermath. However, later realising she may have been too harsh on Jasmine, Serena decides to mentor her. On Darwin Ollie and Zosia bring a box of their belongings to work as they make plans to declutter their lives, but when Ollie finds an engagement ring, he believes Zosia is planning to propose. He considers whether he is ready for marriage and questions proposing to her – until Zosia reveals the ring is a treasured possession of hers. Elsewhere, Dom is devastated when he learns Isaac had sex with Jez, and when he confronts Jez over his one-night stand, Dom begins to question whether he is the reason behind Isaac cheating on him. As Isaac continues to remind Dom throughout the day of his previous failed relationships, Dom takes action to ensure he and Isaac do not break up.
857	18	"Losing Game"	Steve Brett	Kate Verghese, Patrick Homes and Andy Bayliss	7 February 2017	4.78
Serena pushes forwards with her plans to mentor Jasmine, and decides to use a nasty tactic against her in order to make her fail. Serena asks Jasmine to diagnose a patient using only her knowledge and no medical notes or previous scans, and when Jasmine confronts Jac about potential diagnoses, Jac tells Jasmine she can only pass the test by cheating. Following a successful diagnosis, Serena furiously verbally abuses Jasmine before telling her she will be transferred to a different ward. Elsewhere, Hanssen makes a shock return to the hospital when his son is admitted. Isaac performs surgery on Hanssen's son, however, when he makes a mistake, he blames Dom. On Darwin, Jac accidentally reveals she is in a relationship with Matteo to Ollie and Zosia, and as a result tells Matteo that they are over.
858	19	"Four Letter Word"	Steve Brett	Tony Higgins and Andy Bayliss	14 February 2017	4.98
Jac works alongside Matteo to treat an intersex patient requiring surgery, but is avoiding surgery because of a previous surgeon's decision to decide her gender for her. Matteo lies to Jac and tells her he does not accept their patient's sexuality in an attempt to help their patient see that she needs surgery. At the same time, Mo finds a ticket for Italy addressed to Jac, and realises Jac is not over Matteo and is planning to go away with him. After Jac completes surgery, she is persuaded by Mo to go to Italy, and declare her love for Matteo. Kim returns to Keller and discovers she is pregnant – with twins. She tells Raf he is the father. Elsewhere, Bernie realises Serena is beginning to drink more. Dom is left hurt by Isaac, who buys him a dumbbell kit and calendar of toned men's bodies to make Dom realise he needs to work out more.
859	20	"What We Pretend to Be"	Jamie Annett	Owen Lloyd−Fox	21 February 2017	5.03
Isaac becomes paranoid over Dom's whereabouts and assumes he has been sleeping with a patient. When Dom tries to defend himself, Isaac reminds him of his past relationships with patients. A vulnerable patient is admitted to Keller and Isaac takes control of his care, but as Isaac takes his stress out on his patient, he is assaulted. The patient makes a complaint against Isaac, but he is convinced he can help his patient through life-saving surgery. He successfully saves his patient in the operating theatre, and apologises to Dom for his behaviour. Mo and Derwood panic as they suspect Hector has meningitis. Morven notices Serena is continuing to push Jasmine to her limits. Morven tells Jasmine she thinks Serena is getting revenge on her for Elinor's death. When Serena calls Jasmine into her office and tells her off, Morven attempts to stand up for Jasmine, but has little success.
860	21	"The Price We Pay"	Jamie Annett	Chris Murray	28 February 2017	5.34
Jasmine makes a mistake on a mannequin while performing a risky procedure under Serena's watch in preparation for her assessment. Following feedback from Serena – who gives Jasmine a final warning – Jasmine is caught by Jac crying in the corridors. Jac anonymously reports Serena to Hanssen for workplace bullying, which leads to Hanssen observing Serena. By the end of their shift, Serena breaks down in front of AAU and tells Jasmine she cannot get over the fact that Elinor is dead and Jasmine is not. On Darwin, Matteo continues his attempts to impress Jac, but his keenness is picked up on by Hanssen. Raf makes preparations to move in with Kim following his discovery he will be a father of twins, but when Kim also tells his patient that he is the father of her children, Raf's suspicions grow, and he soon learns Kim has been aiding his patient to steal money from a corporate business. Raf calls the police and Kim is arrested.
861	22	"Other People's Dreams"	Ian Barnes	Patrick Homes	7 March 2017	4.88
Jasmine is given the opportunity by Serena to take part in a ground-breaking new operation, which will be performed by Serena, Jac and her team. However, Jasmine has not slept in four days and finds herself battling chronic fatigue while also supporting Morven, who has found a new man on the internet. As the stress and tiredness gets on top of Jasmine, she faints, and finds herself being blackmailed by a patient's brother. As everything becomes too much for Jasmine, she backs out of the operation last minute, and apologises to Serena for letting her down. On Darwin, Ollie tries a new 'zen' strategy to combat Jac's taunting, but he ends up becoming angry at Jac when she gives him an opportunity to take part in the new operation, then tells him he cannot take part, and then finally tells him he can take part again.
862	23	"The Hangover"	Ian Barnes	Simon Norman	14 March 2017	4.99
Jasmine, Ollie, Zosia, Dom, Isaac and Morven all go on a night out drinking together. The next morning, a hungover Dom wakes up in the on-call room. He tries to ring Isaac, who is with another man in his car. When Isaac arrives in the hospital, Hanssen reminds the pair that a group of electives will be present on the wards throughout the day. Isaac's man who he spent the night with is admitted to Keller and Dom's paranoia continues to grow. The pairs relationship is strained further when ED receptionist Noel Garcia arrives on the wards to hand over patient files and tells Dom that Isaac got the man out of his car. By the evening, Dom decides he cannot be in a relationship with Isaac, but Isaac twists his behaviour and begs Dom to stay with him. On AAU, Morven tells Jasmine their friendship is over when she learns Jasmine has been impersonating an online single male she was talking to.
863	24	"Growing Pains"	Jermain Julien	Wendy Granditer	21 March 2017	5.01
Zosia is discomforted by Isaac when he learns that she is pregnant. Seeing this as a way to destroy Dom and Zosia's friendship, Isaac pretends to accidentally reveal to Ollie that Zosia is pregnant. Ollie confronts Zosia over Isaac's revelation, to which Zosia reveals she has had a termination. On Keller, Parker's friend, Asia, is admitted with an infected leg wound. Essie involves herself in Parker and Asia's friendship, and helps Asia confront her fears. At the same time, Parker tells Essie he forgives her for getting his mother arrested. On AAU, a care home fire results in an overrun ward. As Fletch attempts to deal with the patients, he finds Evie has been admitted, who is faking a broken wrist. Serena steps in and helps ease the pressure on Fletch, while also helping Evie grow confident about her insecurities.
864	25	"Unbreakable"	Jermain Julien	Johanne McAndrew and Elliot Hope	28 March 2017	5.02
Dom is punished by Hanssen for questionably discharging a patient and given a warning over his behaviour. A patient admitted to Keller soon learns he requires surgery on his leg in order to save it, but Sacha and Isaac decide it is too dangerous to operate on the patient, contrary to Dom's belief, who states the patient needs the surgery immediately. Dom asks Hanssen about the operation and Hanssen agrees to perform surgery alongside Dom. Isaac soon learns of Dom's betrayal against him and Sacha, and after a stressful day takes his anger out on Dom, physically abusing him, before apologising for his actions. On AAU, Jason returns to the hospital and helps Serena confront her grief over losing Elinor, but when the recipient of Elinor's heart is admitted, and Serena realises she is treating the patient with Elinor's heart, she struggles to control her emotions, and lashes out at Jasmine, telling her she wishes it was her in the morgue instead of Elinor.
865	26	"It's Only Love If It Hurts"	Karl Neilson	Nick Fisher	4 April 2017	4.31
Serena's bullying of Jasmine continues to damage her confidence. Finally fed up of Serena's harsh words and demeaning attitude, Jasmine hands in her resignation. When Serena learns of Jasmine's intentions to resign, she attempts to persuade her to stay. With little success, Serena becomes forceful, causing Jac and Hanssen to get involved. Hanssen warns Serena of her inappropriate behaviour, but Jasmine pulls her resignation and the complaint against Serena before any action can be taken. Serena finally realises she needs to take some time off work to grieve for Elinor. Zosia notices Dom's bruises and investigates his injuries. Dom admits to Zosia that Isaac physically abused him, but tells her he has no intentions of leaving him.
866	27	"Someone to Look after Me"	Karl Neilson	Patrick Homes	11 April 2017	5.02
Dom is annoyed to find a domestic abuse leaflet in his locker, and blames Zosia. Then, when Dom's former boyfriend Kyle arrives on the wards with his partner who is in need of surgery, Isaac manipulates Dom into convincing his patient to having a new, never tried before procedure. Isaac's patient undergoes the risky new surgery procedure, but Dom later backtracks and tells Isaac to stop. Isaac is furious at Dom's actions and abuses him again. Dom stands up for himself but falls down a flight of stairs. When multiple old injuries are found on Dom, he finally reveals he is being domestically abused. Meanwhile, on AAU, Fletch is surprised to learn new agency nurse Sydney is the son of Artem. Sydney warns Fletch she is going to retrieve all of her father's money. Jasmine returns to Darwin for a shift, and impresses Matteo, but fails to impress Jac.
867	28	"Past Imperfect"	James Larkin	Becky Prestwich	18 April 2017	5.02
Jac finds herself having to decide whether to go to Copenhagen for a cardiothoracic conference or on a weekend away with Matteo. She initially chooses the weekend away with Matteo and asks Ollie to attend the Copenhagen conference, but when Matteo begins shiftily making phone calls, Jac's doubts about Matteo's loyalties are tested. Jac confronts Matteo who tells her he is committed to Holby, but when Jac finds a photograph of Matteo and his estranged wife she is furious, and confronts Matteo, who refuses to tell her about his wife. The pair find their relationship straining and later to break up. On AAU, Sydney completes another shift, and after realising Fletch only has good intentions for his family, she decides to let the feud go and allow Fletch to keep the money. Dom gives a statement to the police about his domestic abuse.
868	29	"Two Hearts"	James Larkin	Katie Douglas	25 April 2017	4.74
Matteo attempts to convince Jac to let him perform an outdated two-heart transplant on a patient of his when his patient's deteriorating health means he cannot have a heart transplant. Jac refuses to allow Matteo and Ollie to complete the operation, but when a heart becomes available, Mo argues for the operation being viable. The operation goes ahead, and Matteo's patient survives surgery. Ollie plans to progress with his career and become a consultant. At the end of his shift, Ollie announces he is moving to AAU. Sacha is caught attempting to steal from the pub, concerning Essie. She later talks to Sacha and encourages him to seek help when he realises he is depressed. Ric returns to AAU and takes charge. He later receives a shock when his granddaughter arrives on the wards unexpectedly.
869	30	"Gold Star"	Lisa Mulcahy	Ed Sellek	2 May 2017	4.90
Ollie begins his first shift on AAU, but his eagerness to impress Bernie leads to friction between Bernie and Ric. When Bernie recommends an emergency trauma procedure for their patient, Ollie consults with Ric and asks for his opinion on the situation. Bernie learns what Ollie has done and her annoyance towards Ollie grows. While treating a pregnant patient, Mo is preoccupied by Derwood's mother, Birdie, who is admitted breathless. Tests taken on Birdie reveal she has a granuloma. Birdie fears she is going to die and asks Mo if she can see her grandson again. Following a chat, Birdie is given permission to become more involved in Mo and Derwood's lives again. Mo is later left devastated when her pregnant patient dies. Parker arrives at the hospital after being suspended from school. Essie finds contraceptive pills in his bag, and awkwardly attempts to give Parker a sex talk.
870	31	"The Heart Is a Small Thing"	Lisa Mulcahy	Sian Evans	9 May 2017	4.55
Nina Karnik, Matteo's estranged wife, arrives at Holby City when her partner, Luke, is admitted to Darwin. Jac learns of Matteo and Nina's past together, and at the same time learns a dark secret about the pair − their son went missing ten years ago by a riverside and has still not been found. Matteo struggles to accept Nina's decision to sell their family home, but later realises she is only doing what is best for them. On AAU, Cameron returns as a mentee to oversee an operation led by Bernie and the Trauma team. Morven is surprised by Cameron's reappearance, and it is obvious that the potential for a relationship between the two is still there. Dom returns to Keller, but his confrontational attitude towards a patient leaves Sacha concerned.
871	32	"Project Aurous"	Jermain Julien	Claire Miller	16 May 2017	4.74
Jac braces herself for the unveiling of her new Aurous Project, a potentially life-saving stent Darwin have developed. Jac kicks Matteo off the project as she endeavours to make the project's opening a success. However, she is distracted by the return of Fran, who is admitted with breathing difficulties. Jac learns Fran has coronary artery disease. Jac hands Fran over to Matteo, but Fran desperately asks Jac to lead her surgery, resulting in Jac going against protocol and performing surgery behind Matteo's back. When Matteo learns of Jac's deceit, he informs Hanssen, who ultimately demotes Jac from her role of clinical lead. At the same time, Jasmine turns against Jac, determined to see Jac's downfall. On Keller, Lofty arrives for his first shift, but when he makes a mistake on the wards, Lofty questions whether he is fit to return to nursing or not.
872	33	"Enigma"	Jermain Julien	Peter Mattessi	23 May 2017	4.58
Lofty is shaken by the arrival of Lenny, a patient admitted to Keller. Sacha latches on to Lofty's mysterious behaviour, but a reluctant Lofty refuses to admit he has a history with Lenny at first. It is later revealed that while Lofty was away, he kissed Lenny, while dating his sister. Lofty struggles to accept his past experience with Lenny as his feelings for Lenny resurface. However, after realising the pain he caused Lenny's sister, Lofty distances himself, while at the same time revealing to Sacha the truth about his past with both Lenny and his sister. Hanssen offers Mo Jac's former job in an acting capacity − Head of Cardiothoracics. Mo accepts the role, but by the end of the day decides she does not wish to fulfil the role, so Matteo takes on the job instead. Jasmine reveals to her friends that she is leaving for a new job in London through a drunken phone call.
873	34	"Twist of the Knife"	Tracey Rooney	Jon Sen	30 May 2017	3.73
A shattered Mo returns to work after taking time off to look after Hector. Derwood asks Jac to look at Hector after he notices Hector has an abnormally fast pulse, is sweating and has unusual movements. Jac performs tests on Hector and notices that he has a fresh bruise around his ribs. Jac queries Mo and Derwood about Hector's bruise, stating that his bruises are consistent with blunt force trauma. Derwood questions Mo about Hector's bruise, wondering whether it was her or not. Zosia soon discovers that a nurse has muddled up her patient's and Hector's blood test results. Jac realises Hector has Rickets. Derwood and Mo are both relieved, but Mo ends her relationship with Derwood following his lack of trust in her. Nina returns to work as a locum on AAU, but her mind lies elsewhere when her and Matteo learn that the police are calling off the search for their son.
874	35	"The Hard Way Home"	Tracey Rooney	Martin Jameson and Nick Fisher	6 June 2017	4.26
Damon Ford, Darwin's new F1 doctor, has an eventful first day on the wards. On Keller, Dom's unprofessional attitude towards a patient concerns Sacha. The patient makes a formal complaint against Dom, forcing Sacha to consider Dom's fitness to work. However, when Sacha is called into theatre, Dom takes over again, and successfully diagnoses his patient with a rare form of cancer. Sacha is impressed and allows Dom to get involved in surgery, but when Dom personally attacks Sacha, he is kicked out of theatre. Lofty learns Dom is taking anabolic steroids and informs Sacha. Sacha later realises it is the anniversary of Arthur's death, as Dom breaks down in Sacha's arms. Jasmine is persuaded to stay at Holby City instead of transferring to another hospital, concerning Fran, who continues to use Jac to try and take Brown and Yates to court for abusing her in their care home as a child.
875	36	"For the Love of Maureen"	Jamie Annett	Joe Ainsworth	13 June 2017	4.10
Mo's last day at Holby City arrives. Her final patient is one familiar to her, who is urgently requiring a heart transplant, but when the heart which becomes available for her patient has to go to a more urgent case, Mo finds herself having to persuade her patient to remain on the transplant list. By the end of the day, her patient successfully receives a new heart, and Mo goes to her leaving party. It is there Mo realises that she is not ready to let Derwood go. Mo finds Derwood and Hector together in the hospital, and the trio leave Holby City together to begin a new life. On AAU, a patient with a hemopneumothorax dies while under Jasmine's care. Fran slyly makes a complaint against Jasmine as a result of her clinical error. Ric's granddaughter, Darla, is admitted requiring an appendix operation. However, tensions between Ric and his son, Kofi, makes Ric and Darla's relationship strain.
876	37	"For You May Be the Next to Die..."	Jamie Annett	Patrick Homes	20 June 2017	4.18
Jasmine is shook when Fran implies that Jac was the one who made a complaint against her. Determined to help Jac realise that she is a victim of abuse from the care home sexual assault scandal, Jasmine confronts Jac about her complaint and uses Jac's fear of accepting she needs help to explain her actions. Jac insists she is not behind the complaint, and Jasmine soon realises when Fran slips up in the locker room, making it obvious that she made the complaint. Jasmine tries to call Jac, but Fran steals Jac's phone. Jasmine places a scalpel in her pocket after convincing an abuse victim to help herself. Jasmine then goes to visit Jac in a lab corridor, but finds Fran. Fran angrily pushes Jasmine into a wall, causing the scalpel to stab Jasmine. Fran walks away, and Jasmine is later found by Damon. Despite best efforts to try and save her, Jasmine dies.
877	38	"Paper Wishes"	Richard Platt	Patrick Homes and Ailsa Macaulay	27 June 2017	4.62
Jac throws herself into work in the aftermath of Jasmine's death. Hanssen explains Jasmine's death to the hospital and initiates an internal inquiry. Morven visits Hanssen as she struggles to comprehend Jasmine's death; Hanssen explains that the chances of understanding what led to Jasmine's death will most probably never be fully understood, but a reluctant Morven vows to expose the reality. A patient who believes in karma is admitted to Darwin. Jac helps the patient understand that she needs to have a less fatalistic outlook on life, before privately grieving for Jasmine. Fran notices that Jac blames herself for Jasmine's death, but refuses to admit that she was involved in the accident. Donna Jackson returns to AAU following a six year absence, and struggles to redeem herself as she refuses to read the updated regulations manual. Sacha's mother sets Sacha up on a blind date.
878	39	"Keeping the Faith"	Baff Akoto	Jeff Povey	4 July 2017	4.18
Morven drowns her grieving in alcohol at Jasmine's wake. Fran comforts Morven, and the next morning the pair awake in Morven's flat, with Fran having slept in Jasmine's bedroom for the night. Fran steals a bracelet of Jasmine's. At the hospital, Morven tells Jac she would like to rotate wards and specialise in cardiothoracic surgery. Jac is not fazed by Morven's claim, and when Morven arrives at Jac's office for her interview she learns that Morven is desperate to seek answers for Jasmine. Jac kicks Morven off of Darwin. When Morven returns to AAU she finds Fran with Jasmine's bracelet and violently confronts Fran, holding her against a wall, forcing Bernie to sign Morven off work for a few weeks. Sacha finds himself in a difficult situation when Darla is readmitted to Keller requiring another operation and Ric and Kofi have different outlooks on how Sacha should operate on her.
879	40	"Sleep Well"	Sean Glynn	Johanne McAndrew and Elliot Hope	11 July 2017	4.60
Jac and Fran receive a shock when Daniel Brown, the man who abused Fran in the care home when she was younger, is admitted to Darwin following what at first seems to be a mugging. Fran struggles to contain her emotions as her traumatic ordeal plays on her mind. Jac retrieves Daniel's belongings from the ED and realises someone was paid to beat him up. She asks Fran if it was her. Fran initially denies all claims, but later takes responsibility. Jac makes another discovery when she finds an apology note from Fran in Jasmine's book of condolence. Jac confronts Fran and Fran admits that she was the one who shoved Jasmine and left her to die. Fran is arrested, as Jac's mind is put at ease about what happened to Jasmine. Keller ward is put on lockdown when it is thought a patient with a contagious virus is admitted. Donna treats a school friend who reminds her what life is about.
880	41	"Going the Distance"	Sean Glynn	Chris Murray	18 July 2017	4.29
Essie questions her capabilities in looking after Parker when a patient with his progressively ill mother is admitted to Keller. She is determined to keep the responsibility of looking after Parker her own, and refuses any help from Raf, although Essie later realises that a male figure in Raf's life may be the stability he needs. Morven returns to work following her attack on Fran. Bernie asks Donna to keep an eye on Morven, and the pair treat a man who is thought to have a stomach ulcer, however he later dies in the operating theatre when the team miss an aortoenteric fistula. Morven copes well with her patient's death, reminding herself what her job is all about. On Darwin, Jac is tasked with assessing Damon. Damon successfully passes his exams, and Jac demands her job back from Hanssen and Matteo.
881	42	"Baggage"	Tracey Rooney	Patrick Homes	25 July 2017	4.24
Donna arrives at work, with her head high, despite being desperate for money. When her niece, Mia, shows up unexpectedly at the hospital asking for payment for her school trip, Donna checks her joint account and learns that her estranged husband Jared has locked her out of it, and will not contribute to Mia's school trip. Donna attempts to keep her news from Mia, but when Mia reads the text messages between Donna and Jared, Donna is forced to come clean about her financial situation. Hanssen is confident that Nina will become the hospital's new medical director. He sends Nina up to Darwin, where she becomes distracted persuading Matteo to sign their divorce papers. Matteo is reluctant to sign the papers, believing they still have a chance to be together, and his instinct proves right when they decide to rebuild their marriage. Sacha slips up about Lofty's sexuality to Dom.
882	43	"The Evolution of Woman"	Tracey Rooney	Simon Norman	1 August 2017	4.26
Nina recruits Guy Self back to Holby City as she begins her role as medical director. Hanssen is disturbed by Guy's return, fully aware of the damage it could potentially have to the reputation of the hospital. He warns Nina of Guy's previous incident with Tristan Wood last year. When Nina questions Guy about Tristan, Guy warns Nina that he will expose what she did in Berlin, should she choose to no longer work alongside him to restart the neurology ward on Darwin. Feeling trapped, Nina continues to work alongside Guy, as he performs a life-changing neuro operation on a patient with OCD. On AAU, a hungover Morven is assigned the teacher of Damon, but things are made awkward between the pair following a one-night stand they had the previous night. Sacha begins dating a librarian who looks like his mother.
883	44	"Go Ugly Early"	Dominic Keavey	Nick Fisher	8 August 2017	4.04
Nina explains to Bernie and Ric that AAU's trauma unit will be closing with immediate effect as a result of a threat to hospital closure. Bernie is devastated by Nina's revelation, and an army soldier is admitted to AAU with a mangled leg, Bernie ignores Nina's announcement and instead uses the trauma unit to treat the soldier. Following successful treatment to the soldier, Nina forcefully has the trauma unit closed. As a result, Bernie decides to leave Holby City to join Serena in Southern France, before returning to the army. On Darwin, Guy learns that Zosia had an abortion and is unimpressed. He uses Zosia's mother in an attempt to enforce his vision of Zosia's wedding, but his plan backfires when Zosia realises what he is up to. On Keller, Dom, Essie and Sacha are tricked by a patient into thinking Lofty's pet dog has died.
884	45	"Calm Before the Storm"	Dominic Keavey	Katie Douglas	15 August 2017	4.13
Guy requests Ollie's help on a patient with a brain tumour requiring surgery. Ollie agrees to help Guy, and in the process of treating their patient, they continue to strengthen their relationship. Guy then asks Ollie to act in a cardiothoracic specialist role at a meeting he has with Hanssen, in an attempt to encourage Hanssen to allow an FMRI scanner to be built in the hospital. Ollie agrees to assist Guy at his meeting, but when he arrives, he learns that Guy has used brain scans belonging to his dead wife Tara Lo (Jing Lusi) as a case study, and is infuriated. Ollie warns Guy to stay away from him. On Keller, Sacha's rabbi is admitted after collapsing at the synagogue. Sacha learns his rabbi has bowel cancer, prompting him to make a decision over his belief in God. Nina and Matteo return from their weekend holiday, and Donna learns it was not as romantic as Nina anticipated.
885	46	"Wildest Dreams"	Paulette Randall	Angela Holden	22 August 2017	4.25
Ollie grows paranoid following Guy's suggestion that Tara could have been saved if more advanced scans were taken on her, and contacts St. James's for a second opinion. While awaiting results, Ollie preoccupies himself by operating on a patient with gallstones, but perforates the gall bladder. Ollie grows frustrated at himself over his error, and insists that if more advanced scans had been taken he would have been confident in performing the operation. When the test results return from St. James's, Ollie learns that an alternative doctor's opinions were not much different, and realises he needs to move on. On Darwin, Jac offers Zosia an internship at Yale University to advance her cardiothoracic career. Zosia accepts Jac's offer, but later rejects it after noticing Guy make a mistake while operating on a patient. Dom reveals to Lofty he is going on a date.
886	47	"Keep on Running"	Paulette Randall	Michelle Lipton	29 August 2017	3.84
Fletch, Donna and Essie compete against each other for the role of director of nursing. However, when a four-wheel drive crashes into Holby Half Marathon during the event, Fletch is caught up in the influx of casualties admitted, and is forced to reschedule his interview with Nina. Jac is called to Darwin to help Fletch treat a single father involved in the crash. Jac makes Fletch realise that his defeatist attitude needs to change, which helps Fletch ultimately secure the position of director of nursing. On Keller, Freddie, Dom's date, is also admitted after being caught up in the crash. Lofty looks out for Dom, who decides to end things with Freddie. Guy pushes Zosia to her limits on her first day of training on the neurological department. He begins drinking in his office after being taunted by Jac over Zosia, and also misses his counselling appointment.
887	48	"How Loud It Is"	Jamie Annett	Andy Bayliss	5 September 2017	4.07
Hanssen is surprised by the return of his son, Fredrik, to the wards of Holby City, only this time as a registrar. Fully aware of the damaging effects Fredrik had when his previous clinical drug trial at the hospital resulted in six deaths, Hanssen is cautious about Fredrik's return. Fredrik works on Keller alongside Dom and Sacha. Fredrik helps out in theatre on an operation with the pair, but sabotages the operation when he places an additional swab inside the patient, resulting in Sacha undergoing a formal investigation, and potentially jeopardising his career and the hospital. Zosia is encouraged to take charge of an operation on a patient with fluid in the brain by Guy. Guy admires Zosia on how far she has progressed in her career, before abandoning Zosia in the operating theatre and leaving her to perform the operation herself. Zosia fears for Guy's wellbeing, as Nina informs her that he has been skipping his counselling appointments.
888	49	"The Man Who Sold the World"	Jamie Annett	Joe Ainsworth	12 September 2017	4.55
Donna is surprised by the arrival of Jared on AAU whilst she is treating a patient with nausea. She is then dealt another shock when she learns that the patient she is treating is Jared's girlfriend. Jared flirts with Donna, and tells her that he misses her and the kids, and wants to give their relationship another go. Donna resists Jared's temptations, despite his best efforts to win her over. Guy's growing erratic behaviour causes Zosia great concern, to which she voices her worries to Ollie, telling him that she thinks Guy is drinking whilst working. Guy operates on a patient whilst under the influence of alcohol, and so Zosia calls Hanssen to the operating theatre, who suspends Guy immediately. Zosia visits Guy outside of the hospital, where he demeans her and tells her that her mother would not be proud of her.
889	50	"Veil of Tears – Part One"	Jan Bauer	Joe Ainsworth	19 September 2017	4.52
Guy is called into the hospital and informed that he has been suspended pending further investigation. Nina asks Jac to review old medical cases of Guy's to check for any medical errors. Guy heads over to the wedding venue as the day of Ollie and Zosia's wedding arrives. He attempts to fix his relationship with Zosia one more time, but when Zosia realises that she is being manipulated she orders Guy to stay away from her. Guy orders more alcohol at the venue, and after another confrontation with Zosia in front of the guests at the reception, he is taken to a bedroom by Lofty to sleep. Once alone, Guy smashes several glasses, and overdoses, resulting in him falling on a shard of glass. Zosia and Ollie later find Guy and he is rushed to the hospital, where Jac and Nina operate on him. Guy survives the operation, as Ollie attempts to comfort a distressed Zosia. Dom breaks up with his boyfriend at the wedding reception when he complains about how boring the wedding is. He seeks support from Lofty, which results in the pair having sex.
890	51	"Veil of Tears – Part Two"	Nigel Douglas	Michelle Lipton	26 September 2017	4.32
Guy wakes up and informs Jac that she would like her to persuade Zosia to return to the cardiothoracic surgery team. Jac manages to persuade Zosia to return to the cardiothoracic team, but tells Zosia that she is still required to complete her Yale placement. Zosia questions what she really wants, and eventually realises that her passion is cardiothoracic surgery. However, when Jac tells Zosia that it was Guy's idea to send her to Yale, she realises that Guy is going to attempt suicide again, and rushes to his aid. Guy overdoses again, but is saved once more. Zosia is heartbroken by Guy's reckless actions, and decides to go on the Yale placement, leaving Holby and Ollie behind. Dom is surprised when Freddie is admitted to Keller following a fight. Dom struggles to keep his infidelity a secret, and ends up telling Freddie everything, resulting in Freddie punching Lofty. Dom is upset by Freddie's actions, and ends their relationship. Donna clashes with Ric when he forgets to lock the bathroom door before having a shower.
891	52	"Left Behind"	Nigel Douglas	Wendy Granditer	3 October 2017	4.40
Nina is horrified when a patient recognises her and Matteo as the couple whose son went missing. This throws Nina's professional vision uneven, and she ends up walking out while performing an operation on the patient. When Matteo goes to comfort Nina, she admits to Matteo that she hired a private investigator to investigate Matteo himself, as she was suspicious that he was responsible for their son's kidnap. Matteo is heartbroken by Nina's confession, and tells her that he does not think he can be in a relationship with her anymore. Sacha and Fredrik clash when Fredrik tries to persuade a patient with a DNR to have pioneering surgery to prolong his life. When Fredrik resuscitates the patient, Sacha is furious, although the patient soon agrees to having the surgery, and is thankful to Fredrik for resuscitating him. Jac throws Ollie into work to help distract him from Zosia.
892	53	"The Coming Storm"	Daikin Marsh	Patrick Homes	10 October 2017	4.28
Fletch attends his first director of nursing meeting with the Trust board, where he is informed by Hanssen and Nina that Holby City faces the threat of a merger with St. Francis hospital. Fletch is told to brace himself for uncertain times ahead, and is told that there will be no more vacancies for nursing positions within Holby City; Hanssen also reveals that Fletch must tell Essie that her job has dissolved and the role of transplant co-ordinator remains with the co-ordinator in St. Francis. Essie is furious about the decision. Fletch's day does not get any easier when incompetent nurse Amira Zafar returns to Holby, posing as a specialist nurse. Jac is annoyed by Amira when she proves her incompetence on Darwin, and Fletch later loses his patience with Amira in theatre. Amira reveals that she also made a mistake on AAU in previous weeks. Essie prepares herself for Kim's return to the hospital to see Parker following her release from prison. She does not cope well when Kim reveals that she would like to take Parker to Gibraltar with her, although later lets Parker go with Kim when she realises what is best for him. Ric faces a potential inquest over the death of a patient in a coma.
893	54	"Thicker Than Water"	Daikin Marsh	Peter Mattessi	17 October 2017	4.19
Fredrik and Sara are determined to win Hanssen's support for their new drug trial, which they plan to try out on a patient who Fredrik briefly treated over in Sweden. However, when Hanssen clicks on to Fredrik's optimistic and enthusiastic attitude, he begins to query whether Fredrik knew about the patient beforehand. Fredrik admits to his knowledge of the patient prior to the surgery, leading to Hanssen revealing that the drug trial cannot go ahead. Hanssen does inform Fredrik however that he would like to develop their relationship somehow. Sara is unnerved by Fredrik's risky actions, and tries to encourage Fredrik to go and pick up their son, but Fredrik refuses, determined to win Hanssen over. Raf's brother, Giuseppe, is admitted following a scuffle. Tensions linger between the pair, especially when Raf learns his brother is cheating once again on his wife. Jac informs Ollie that Damon finds him boring, encouraging Ollie to try and appear more interesting.
894	55	"Things Left Unsaid"	Steve Brett	Robert Goldsbrough	24 October 2017	4.12
Nina learns that she is pregnant. She plans to tells Matteo, but when Matteo insists that their relationship is over and she needs to realise he does not love her anymore, she decides it is best to keep her pregnancy a secret from him. However, Fredrik notices Nina coming out of the gynaecology ward, and tells her that he knows she is pregnant. He later agrees to keep her pregnancy a secret after confiding in Nina about his wife and son moving back to Sweden and leaving him. On AAU, it is Lofty's first shift. He manages to get on Morven's nerves when a frequent patient insists she requires hospital treatment, although he later manages to impress Morven when he proves the patient is in need of medical assistance. On Darwin, Ollie is thrown by the arrival of new neurological consultant Roxanna MacMillan, who treated Tara in the lead up to her death. Ollie struggles to work alongside Roxanna and questions her clinical judgements. Roxanna soon helps Ollie realise that he needs to remember Tara as his wife, and not a patient who died under her care.
895	56	"Know Yourself, Know Your Enemy"	Steve Brett	Johanne McAndrew and Elliot Hope	31 October 2017	4.02
Donna discovers contradictory evidence regarding Ric on the day of his court hearing when Morven looks through the patient's files and queries why Ric did not administer anticoagulants to the patient. Ric is questioned over his actions in the court, but is adamant he did request the drugs and cannot understand why they were not recorded in the medical records. Ric recalls asking Donna for the medication, but Donna does not remember Ric asking her. When it is Donna's turn to take the stand in court, she is questioned regarding Ric's administration of the anticoagulant drugs. Donna is honest and tells the judge she cannot remember Ric asking for the drugs; the case ends with a referral to the CPS with consideration of criminal charges to gross negligence manslaughter. Jac is unimpressed when Amira returns to Darwin following a shortage of nurses on the ward. She is determined to kick Amira from the ward, and desperately asks Fletch to get rid of her. Fletch questions whether Jac's problems lie with Amira or are more personal to her. Dom goes head-to-head with Fredrik to try and find a research project. He is delighted when Hanssen chooses his proposal over Fredrik's.
896	57	"Kingdom Come"	Jermain Julien	Ed Sellek	7 November 2017	4.17
Hanssen feels the increasing pressure on the hospital with the merger looming over and the health assessors visiting. Fearing for the worst as the likelihood of Holby City hospital closing down increases, Hanssen decides that it is time to tell the staff that a merger is going to take place. Sacha is informed the health assessors will be visiting Keller. He remains calm and professional, impressing the assessors. Ollie panics and gets wound up when he loses his wedding ring. However, with help from Matteo, Ollie is encouraged to find a way to move on from Zosia. Donna returns to work following the court hearing, and feels as though she is being judged. Her life is not made any easier when Jeremy returns and asks Donna if he can see his mother's notes, following the outcome of the court hearing. Jeremy later threatens to sue the hospital when Donna fails to give him his mother's notes. Jeremy later apologises for his threat, and gives Donna his phone number.
897	58	"It Has to Be Now"	Jermain Julien	Becky Prestwich	14 November 2017	4.26
Morven receives a big shock when Lofty tells her that his patient, Evelyn, is her mother. Evelyn breaks down as she realises she has come face-to-face with her daughter once again. Morven struggles to contain her emotions, but continues to go against protocol and treat Evelyn, that is until Evelyn tells Raf that she is her daughter. Essie and Raf secretly marry. Sacha is broken upon learning the pair have wedded, and reminds Essie that he will always love her and be there for her. Ollie is determined to win funding for his chest wall reconstruction project. When Ollie realises that he faces competition from Roxanna, he is prompted to persuade his patient to be operated on by him. However, when his patient gives him the run around before surgery, Ollie realises that compassion comes before funding, and asks Nina to let Roxanna's dementia project win.
898	59	"Hungry Heart"	Thomas Hescott	Sian Evans	21 November 2017	4.15
Donna braces herself as the day of her interview for Ric's case. Following her interview, Donna questions Ric over why he left the ward on the day of his patient's death. Ric reveals he was helping a friend, but refuses to reveal to Donna who it was. It is later revealed that Ric has been charged with medical manslaughter. A decision is made over the merger. The hospital is safe, and St. Francis will merge with Holby. Fredrik is bitter when Hanssen reveals that Dom has been awarded the junior-doctor prize. Nina recommends that Fredrik applies for the registrar post, and reassures him that she will back him up, should he choose to apply. Fredrik spends his day trying to impress Hanssen once again, but he once again fails. Fredrik pleas with Hanssen to help him with his projects, but Hanssen turns his back on his son once again, and so Fredrik leaves. However, before he does, he reveals to Matteo that Nina is pregnant. Fletch tells Jac and Matteo that Damon has been in touch with his former mentor, Mr Nasidi. Jac asks Matteo if he thinks they have been working Damon too hard, to which Matteo tells her he does not think they have. At the end of his shift, Damon reveals he is leaving Holby to work with his mentor once again.
899	60	"Hiding Places"	Thomas Hescott	Gerard Sampaio	28 November 2017	4.37
Jac's personal and professional lives collide when Emma's nanny quits. Fletch tries to help Jac, but she pushes him away. Raf arrives on Darwin with a patient, who Jac treats. Raf and Fletch begin to wonder is something is up with Jac when she does not persuade her patient who is refusing urgent surgery to have it. Later in theatre, Jac hesitates, but successfully performs surgery. Fletch reminds Jac that she is not alone, and he is there for her. Jeremy returns to the hospital to talk to Donna once again about Ric, as he becomes increasingly obsessed in Ric's whereabouts on the day of his mother's death. Donna is unnerved by Jeremy's forceful and persistent attitude. Jeremy later gets violent with Donna in the café, and Jac intervenes, forcing security to remove him. Jeremy warns Jac and Donna that they are making a big mistake getting him removed. Nina requests Ollie to go to Keller to help her on a case, but Matteo insists he goes instead, where he confronts Nina over her pregnancy. Nina reveals she is planning to go to Amsterdam to live with her sister. The pair reconcile and Matteo admits he never stopped loving Nina. They leave together to start a new life.
900	61	"Group Animal – Part One"	Paulette Randall	Andy Bayliss	5 December 2017	4.92
Jac braces herself for a big operation that she must perform alongside professor John Gaskell, a hugely well-known surgeon and the director of surgical innovations, who has changed many lives throughout his career. John's arrival to Holby City spreads excitement. Feeling the pressure to prove herself in theatre, Jac removes Ollie from his scheduled operations and performs them herself, using it as practice. She then proceeds to perform surgery with John, but runs out halfway through the operation, allowing her nerves to get the better of her. She is encouraged back into theatre by John, and finishes the surgical procedure. Afterwards, Jac breaks down in Fletch's arms, and allows the traumatic events from the past few months to catch up with her. Jac then decides she is ready to quit her job and spend more time with her daughter, but as she makes her way down the stairs to hand in her resignation, she is greeted by an anonymous figure, and is shot in the back. Jac falls to the floor and is left to die.
901	62	"Group Animal – Part Two"	Paulette Randall	Andy Bayliss	7 December 2017	5.19
Jac lies on the floor unconscious. The gunman proceeds through the hospital corridors and onto AAU ward. The lights go out and another shot is fired. Hanssen instigates the major incident procedure and the hospital is sent into lockdown. Essie, John, Sacha and Hanssen find Jac and take her into the basement to operate on her. Donna fears for her life as the gunman walks directly through AAU. She sees the gunman's face, and tells Ric, who has smuggled himself into the hospital. The gunman then walks up to Darwin, where Ollie, Morven and Roxanna are operating on David, Roxanna's husband. The gunman shoots Ollie in the head. Roxanna operates on Ollie and saves him, but David dies. The gunman then moves to Keller ward, where it is revealed that it is Fredrik who is shooting staff at Holby. Fredrik's next target is Dom, but he is intercepted by Hanssen, who tries to persuade Fredrik not to shoot anyone else. Armed police shoot Fredrik and he is killed. Following Fredrik's death, the hospital is reopened. Essie listens to a voicemail message from Raf. Raf tells Essie he has been shot and that he loves her. Raf is then found dead in the lift, shot in the neck.
902	63	"We Need to Talk About Fredrik"	Toby Frow	Patrick Homes	12 December 2017	4.71
Meena Chowdhury and Nicky McKendrick arrive at Holby for their first shift, having been transferred from St. Francis'. Hanssen is determined to protect his staff and their wellbeing, and gives the strict instruction that Meena and Nicky do not treat any patients, but only observe. Dom is tasked with mentoring Meena, but his attitude makes it difficult for Meena to bond with him. Dom also refuses to allow Meena to observe, placing Meena in a difficult situation. On AAU, Nicky is placed under Hanssen's watch. When Hanssen abruptly reacts to a menacing child on the wards and ends up cutting his hand, Meena and Nicky unite and treat him. Jac requires an operation as part of her recovery. Frieda Petrenko is called back on the personal behalf of Elliot Hope to operate on Jac. Jac refuses to be operated on by Frieda, but is later persuaded. Roxanna prepares to wake Ollie up, but before she can, he has a seizure.
903	64	"Always Forever"	Toby Frow	Simon Norman	19 December 2017	4.39
Morven is accidentally overdosed on a leaking bottle of nitrous oxide in the storeroom whilst trying to avoid Cameron, who has returned for a locum shift on AAU. Whilst overdosed, Morven has visions of Arthur. Morven considers leaving Holby City, but her memories of Arthur stop her. However, after talking to Hanssen, Morven decides she is ready for a new start, and leaves with Cameron. Essie hands Jac her resignation form; Jac realises that she is not ready to leave her job yet, and helps Fletch ease the pressure on Darwin when St. Francis declares a black alert and an influx of patients are brought to Holby. Essie bonds with John whilst they work on diagnosing a patient. Ric is arrested when, after being taunted by Jeremy, he assaults him.

== Production and reception ==
The series began airing on Tuesday nights on BBC One from 11 October 2016, and concluded on 19 December 2017. Story conferencing for the series began on 15 March 2016. Oliver Kent continued his role as the executive producer of the show until December 2016, when he was appointed Head of Continuing Drama Series for BBC Scripted Studios. Simon Harper served as the series producer until December 2016, where he was then subsequently appointed acting executive producer until 8 June 2017, where he was then officially appointed the position of executive producer. As a result of Harper's appointment, Kate Hall took over as the show's series producer. The series consisted of 64 episodes.

On 21 November 2017, it was announced that this series would feature an "explosive" two-part episode focusing on the proposed merger between Holby City Hospital and St. Francis Hospital. Harper billed the episodes as "stunningly dramatic and moving". The episodes introduce John Gaskell, portrayed by Paul McGann, and heavily focus on Jac Naylor (Marcel), Ric Griffin (Quarshie) and Henrik Hanssen (Henry). Gaskell arrives and tries to help the hospital through their challenges but creates conflict with Jac, who is battling personal and professional issues at the same time. Sophie Dainty of Digital Spy reported that the hospital would be "plunged into darkness, with the greatest threat the hospital has ever experienced". Harper said he was "enormously proud" of the cast, crew and head writer Andy Bayliss, the show's head writer. On the episode, Harper commented, "You'll see our NHS heroes instinctively rush towards the hospital's greatest peril yet in a story that changes lives forever".

In August 2017, storylines from series 19, including Dom's domestic abuse, Jasmine's death and Mo and Mr T's relationship, were included in the longlist for Best Drama Storyline at the Inside Soap Awards. Dom's domestic abuse storyline made the viewer-voted shortlist, but lost out to Casualty's helicopter crash. At the 2018 Writers' Guild of Great Britain Awards, Peter Mattessi won the Best Long Running TV Series category for his episode "Rocket Man". Holby City was shortlisted in the "Best Soap/Continuing Drama" category at the 2018 Broadcast Awards, but lost out to Channel 4 soap opera Hollyoaks. Judges for the awards praised Jasmine's death and felt that it was "a reminder that Holby's heroes don't always save the day." They also liked the hostility between Jasmine and Fran, who they called "psychologically fractured", and Fran's fall from the hospital's roof.

== Cast ==
=== Overview ===
The series begins with 16 roles receiving star billing. Guy Henry portrays Henrik Hanssen, the hospital's chief executive officer and a consultant general surgeon. Hugh Quarshie plays Ric Griffin, the clinical lead of Keller ward, and later the Acute Assessment Unit, and a consultant general surgeon, who later acted as the hospital's CEO. Catherine Russell stars as Serena Campbell, the clinical lead of the AAU and a consultant general surgeon, and Rosie Marcel acts as Jac Naylor, the clinical lead of Darwin ward and a consultant cardiothoracic surgeon. John Michie portrays Guy Self, a consultant neurosurgeon working on Darwin ward, and Chizzy Akudolu plays Mo Effanga, a consultant on the cardiothoracic surgery ward, Darwin. Bob Barrett stars as Sacha Levy, a consultant general surgeon and clinical skills teacher on Keller ward, who is later promoted to the clinical lead of Keller ward. James Anderson acts as Oliver Valentine, a specialist registrar in cardiothoracics on Darwin, and later in general surgery on the AAU. Joe McFadden plays Raf di Lucca, a general surgical specialist registrar on the AAU and later, Keller ward. Camilla Arfwedson appears as Zosia March, a CT2 doctor and later, cardiothoracic specialist registrar on Darwin ward, while David Ames portrays Dominic Copeland, a CT2 doctor and later, a general surgical specialist registrar on Keller ward. Eleanor Fanyinka acts as Morven Digby, an F2 doctor and the foundation doctor representative, and later CT1 doctor, on the AAU, while Lucinda Dryzek stars as Jasmine Burrows, an F1 doctor on Darwin ward, and later Keller ward and the AAU. Alex Walkinshaw plays Adrian Fletcher, the ward manager of the AAU and later, director of nursing services, while Kaye Wragg portrays Essie Harrison, the transplant co-ordinator and a staff nurse on Keller ward. Ben Hull, Jules Robertson and Marc Elliott continue their semi-regular roles as consultant obstetrician/gynaecologist Derwood "Mr T" Thompson, clinical audit assistant (and later, porter) Jason Haynes and general surgical specialist registrar Isaac Mayfield.

Henry departs the series in episode 3 although producers confirmed it was a temporary break and the character would return in the future. Hanssen guest appears in episode 13, before returning in episode 18. Michie and Jonathan McGuiness (who played semi-recurring character Tristian Wood) depart in episode 6. It was confirmed in June 2017 that Michie had returning to filming, following reports alluding to his return. Guy returns in episode 43, and departs in episode 51. Kaisa Hammarlund makes her final appearance as her semi-recurring character, bank nurse Inga Olsen in episode 13. Russell took a break in 2017 to star in a production of What The Butler Saw and Serena departs in episode 26. She will return in the following series. Elliott makes his final appearance in episode 27 at the conclusion of his storyline. Akudolu's departure from the series was revealed on 12 May 2017. Akudolu told Laura-Jayne Tyler of Inside Soap that Hull had also left his role as Mr. Thompson and the characters would depart together in episode 36. She also revealed that both characters could return in the future, saying "our producer has said to me that it's a revolving door, so it would be lovely to pop back for a bunch of episodes." Dryzek's character, Jasmine is killed off in episode 37 when she was stabbed after keeping a scalpel in her front pocket. Dryzek said in an interview with Victoria Wilson of What's on TV that she felt her character's death is an "almighty way for Jasmine to bow out" and thought that transferring Jasmine to London would have been "wrong". Arfwedson's departure was confirmed on 10 September 2017, and Zosia departs in episode 51 after deciding to move to America to further her career. In November 2017, McFadden hinted that he would be leaving his role as Raf di Lucca after appearing in Strictly Come Dancing had inspired him to try new roles. Raf departs in episode 62; his exit was kept out of spoilers for "maximum impact".

Bernie Wolfe (Jemma Redgrave) was revealed to be returning on 13 September 2016, following her departure at the end of the previous series. She returns in episode 7. Advanced spoilers released on 25 July 2017 revealed that Bernie would be departing again, making her final appearance in episode 44. On 10 February 2017, it was announced that former Casualty character Ben "Lofty" Chiltern, portrayed by Lee Mead, would join the cast of Holby City. Lofty makes his first appearance in episode 32. Jaye Jacobs was also confirmed to reprise her role as staff nurse Donna Jackson, having last appeared in 2011. Donna returns in episode 38. The reintroduction of Fran Reynolds (Carli Norris), an agency nurse who shared a backstory with Jac, was revealed on 7 March 2017. She returns in episode 32 and later became a nurse on the AAU. Hermione Gulliford joins the cast as consultant neurosurgeon Roxanna MacMillan in episode 55 after previously appearing in three episodes in series 15. On 4 October 2017, Digital Spy exclusively revealed that Olga Fedori would be reprising her role as Frieda Petrenko. Harper spoke out about Fedori's return as Frieda, telling viewers to "expect fireworks from these two huge personalities." Frieda returns in episode 63.

Christian Vit joined the cast as Matteo Rossini, a consultant on cardiothoracic surgery ward, Darwin, and makes his first appearance in episode 8. On 10 February 2017, it was announced that Ayesha Dharker and David Ajao would join the cast as general surgeon Nina Karnik, who is married to Matteo, and F1 Damon Ford respectively. Nina debuts in episode 31, whereas Damon first appears in episode 36. Vit finished filming after one year in the role and Dharker and Ajao finished filming after six months in their roles. Damon departs in episode 59, while Matteo and Nina depart together in the following episode. After appearing for one episode in February 2017, Billy Postlethwaite reprised his role as general surgerical registrar Fredrik Johansson, the son of Hanssen, for 12 episodes between episode 48 and episode 59. Fredrik appears for one further episode, in episode 62. Paul McGann was announced to be joining the cast in April 2017 as surgeon Professor John Gaskell, with his first scenes airing in December. The character is billed as a "surgical star with irrepressible charm", while McGann was delighted to join the show and called John "interesting". John debuts in episode 61. The introductions of F1 doctors Nicky McKendrick, portrayed by Belinda Owusu, and Meena Chowdhury, played by Salma Hoque, were announced on 29 September 2017. The pair are friends from school, although find their friendship tested by the hospital experience. Hall said that the doctors would "fight to survive" in the hospital as they came under scrutiny from Jac. Nicky and Meena first appear in episode 63.

The series features several recurring characters, and numerous guest stars. Louisa Clein first appears as Kim Whitfield, a love interest for Raf, in episode 1. Her son Parker Whitfield (Louis Savison) first appears in episode 2. Both characters depart in episode 10. Clein appears again in episodes 19 and 20, while Davison returns in episode 22. Clein reprises the role in episode 53 for one episode, which also serves as Davison's departure. Tessa Peake-Jones reprises her role as Imelda Cousins, the former acting CEO of the hospital who last appeared in the fifteenth series, in episode 3. Ahead of her return, Peake-Jones said that returning to Holby City was "like returning home". Mark Healy was revealed to be returning to his role as Robbie Medcalf, Serena's former partner, on 13 September 2016. He appears in episode 5. Nic Jackman reprises his role as Cameron Dunn, an F1 doctor and Bernie's son, in episode 8. He departs in episode 14, but reappears in episodes 31 and 64. Jamie Nichols reprises his role as Lee Cannon, Dominic's former partner, in episode 11. Serena's daughter, Elinor Campbell (Amy McCallum), is reintroduced for two episodes from episode 12. Mr T's mother, Birdie Thompson (Susan Brown), is introduced for one episode, in episode 13. The character is reintroduced for one episode, appearing in episode 30.

Former recurring characters Carole Copeland (Julia Deakin) and Barry Copeland (Nicholas Ball) return for one episode in episode 14, and Carole was revealed to appear in further episodes on 5 June 2017; she appears in episode 42. Macey Chipping reprises her role as Evie Fletcher, the daughter of Fletch, in episode 24. The reintroduction of Kyle Greenham (Alan Morrissey), an agency nurse and Dom's former partner, was revealed on 7 March 2017; he guest appears in episode 27. Gemma Oaten stars as Sydney Somers, an agency nurse who clashes with Fletch, in episodes 27 and 28. Mia Barron, the niece of Donna, is reintroduced in episode 42 for one episode, having last appeared in the thirteenth series. Briana Shann was recast in the role. Ella Fletcher (Bo London) and Theo Fletcher (Stanley Rabbetts), the youngest children of Fletch, appear in episode 47. Nick Rhys first appears as guest character Jeremy Warren in episode 56. Jeremy is the "grieving" son of a patient who died under the care of Ric and Donna. Rhys was originally contracted for 4-5 episodes before his contract was extended to 7-8 episodes. Imogen Stubbs appears as Evelyn Chapman, the estranged mother of Morven, in episode 58.

This series features seven crossover appearances from characters of sister show, Casualty. Paramedic Jez Andrews, portrayed by Lloyd Everitt, guest stars in episodes 16 and 17. The character is involved in a storyline in which he has sex with Isaac, despite Isaac being in a relationship with Dom. Receptionist Noel Garcia, portrayed by Tony Marshall, guest stars in episode 23. Staff nurse Robyn Miller, portrayed by Amanda Henderson, appears in episode 32 to aid Lofty's introduction. Poppy Jhakra, who appeared as agency nurse Amira Zafar in Casualty, revealed she would be guest appearing in Holby City on 21 June 2017. Amira appears in episodes 53 and 56. Paramedic Iain Dean, portrayed by Michael Stevenson, appears in episode 62.

=== Main characters ===
- David Ajao as Damon Ford (episodes 35–59)
- Chizzy Akudolu as Mo Effanga (until episode 36)
- David Ames as Dominic Copeland
- James Anderson as Oliver Valentine
- Camilla Arfwedson as Zosia March (until episode 51)
- Bob Barrett as Sacha Levy
- Ayesha Dharker as Nina Karnik (episodes 31–60)
- Lucinda Dryzek as Jasmine Burrows (until episode 37)
- Eleanor Fanyinka as Morven Digby (until episode 64)
- Olga Fedori as Frieda Petrenko (from episode 63)
- Hermione Gulliford as Roxanna MacMillan (from episode 55)
- Guy Henry as Henrik Hanssen
- Salma Hoque as Meena Chowdhury (from episode 63)
- Jaye Jacobs as Donna Jackson (from episode 38)
- Rosie Marcel as Jac Naylor
- Joe McFadden as Raf di Lucca (until episode 62)
- Paul McGann as John Gaskell (from episode 61)
- Lee Mead as Ben "Lofty" Chiltern (from episode 32)
- John Michie as Guy Self (until episode 6, episodes 43–51)
- Belinda Owusu as Nicky McKendrick (from episode 63)
- Hugh Quarshie as Ric Griffin
- Jemma Redgrave as Bernie Wolfe (until episode 44)
- Catherine Russell as Serena Campbell (until episode 26)
- Christian Vit as Matteo Rossini (episodes 8–60)
- Alex Walkinshaw as Adrian Fletcher
- Kaye Wragg as Essie Harrison

=== Recurring characters ===
- Darcey Burke as Emma Naylor-Maconie
- Louis Davison as Parker Whitfield
- Marc Elliott as Isaac Mayfield (until episode 27)
- Kaisa Hammarlund as Inga Olsen
- Ben Hull as Derwood "Mr T" Thompson (until episode 36)
- Nic Jackman as Cameron Dunn
- Jonathan McGuiness as Tristan Wood
- Carli Norris as Fran Reynolds
- Billy Postlethwaite as Fredrik Johansson (episodes 48–62)
- Nick Rhys as Jeremy Warren
- Jules Robertson as Jason Haynes
- Jack Hawkins as Alex Lambert

=== Guest characters ===
- Susan Brown as Birdie Thompson
- Louisa Clein as Kim Whitfield
- Macey Chipping as Evie Fletcher
- Julia Deakin as Carole Copeland
- Lloyd Everitt as Jez Andrews
- Mark Healy as Robbie Medcalf
- Amanda Henderson as Robyn Miller
- Poppy Jhakra as Amira Zafar
- Caroline Lee-Johnson as Patsy Brassvine
- Bo London as Ella Fletcher
- Tony Marshall as Noel Garcia
- Amy McCallum as Elinor Campbell
- Alan Morrissey as Kyle Greenham
- Jamie Nichols as Lee Cannon
- Gemma Oaten as Sydney Somers
- Rob Ostlere as Arthur Digby
- Tessa Peake-Jones as Imelda Cousins
- Stanley Rabbetts as Theo Fletcher
- Laura Rogers as Jemima Chase
- Briana Shann as Mia Barron
- Michael Stevenson as Iain Dean
- Imogen Stubbs as Evelyn Chapman
