= John Gaskell =

Fictional character from Casualty

- Holby City character
- Paul McGann as John Gaskell
- First appearance: "Group Animal – Part One"; 5 December 2017
- Last appearance: "One of Us"; 20 November 2018
- Portrayed by: Paul McGann

In-universe information
- Occupation: Consultant neurosurgeon Director of surgical innovations Director of medicine

Professor John Gaskell is a fictional character from the BBC medical drama Holby City, played by actor Paul McGann. He first appeared in the nineteenth series episode "Group Animal − Part One", broadcast on 5 December 2017. John is a consultant neurosurgeon who joins the staff at Holby City Hospital as the director of surgical innovations. The character and McGann's casting was announced on 4 April 2017 and the actor began filming in August. Producers approached McGann about the role while he was appearing in a theatre production and when he liked the character, he signed a twelve-month contract.

John is characterised as an excellent surgeon with an established reputation. John's backstory states he attended university with Henrik Hanssen (Guy Henry) and Roxanna MacMillan (Hermione Gulliford) and in his career, John has used stem cell treatment to reverse motor neurone disease. Despite his fame, John remains down-to-earth and has not become arrogant. John's two-part introduction sees him arrive at the hospital as a mass shooting begins, which kills and injures regular characters. A trailer and promotional image was released for John's introduction. The character has been well-received by critics, who anticipated his introduction.

== Casting ==
On 4 April 2017, it was announced that actor Paul McGann had joined the cast of Holby City as new surgeon Professor John Gaskell. BBC head of continuing drama Oliver Kent expressed his delight at McGann's casting and said he admired the actor's career. Series producer Kate Hall also expressed her joy at McGann's casting, while executive producer Simon Harper called McGann "one of our country's most internationally renowned screen talents". Of his casting, McGann commented, "I'm really excited to be joining Holby. Professor John Gaskell is certainly going to be an interesting character and I can't wait to get started on the wards." McGann began filming in August 2017.

Producers approached McGann about a role in the serial while he was appearing in a touring theatre production. They presented the character to McGann, which impressed him. He proceeded to contact school friend and actor Guy Henry, who portrays Henrik Hanssen in the series. Henry encouraged him to pursue the role. Holby City marked the first time McGann had been involved in a long-running drama series, something which he stated he had always wanted to attempt. He described joining a continuing drama as "a slight culture shock". McGann was initially contracted on a twelve-month contract.

McGann felt that he would have suited a career in medicine if he had not become an actor. McGann said he is not "squeamish", which helped him in the role. He struggled with learning the medical terminology and felt that it was challenging to say the terminology while "looking like you know what you're doing". The first scenes that McGann filmed were set in a theatre, where he had to repeat medical terminology. He compared the scenes to "an initiation ceremony" because his co-stars were able to pronounce the terminology. A surgeon was present in McGann's first scenes to aid him with his portrayal. While filming, the surgeon praised his performance, stating that he mirrored a surgeon's stance in theatre. McGann enjoyed speaking with the medical advisors and learning new facts about medicine. McGann described the filming method as enlightening and "unusual" since he has not worked in such a manner. He also found the initial filming complicated and persistent, commenting, "It's relentless with a new character. They front-load you with it."

== Development ==
=== Characterisation and relationships ===
Incoming superstar and a surgical god, John Gaskell is on a mission to change the future of medicine, reverse the fortunes of the previously condemned – save lives, and provide hope. An extremely private person, Gaskell keeps the specifics of his personal life to himself. Nothing is more important than the work. A keen teacher, he is known for nurturing talent in a firm but fair environment.

— An excerpt from John's profile on the official Holby City website.

John is billed as a "surgical star with irrepressible charm" who will save Holby City Hospital after he arrives with plans to move the hospital into "an exciting but unknown future". John uses his charm to put himself at an advantage. McGann called John a "mercurial force to be reckoned with" who clashes with senior hospital staff Jac Naylor (Rosie Marcel), Henrik Hanssen (Guy Henry) and Ric Griffin (Hugh Quarshie). John has an "international reputation" and believes that the NHS needs a drastic transformation so that it can improve. Hall stated that John's fierce personality creates "a really big galvanising effect" on the hospital staff. John is an excellent surgeon, although McGann stated that this "comes at a price" as there is a "drive" behind John's motives. McGann explained that despite his surgical excellence, John struggles socially and is "quite awkward". John can work well in a challenging environment; he is strong, strong-minded, able to work under pressure and succeed in his work. McGann has a strong Liverpudlian accent, which he had to condense for the role. The actor hoped that fans would like his character, but also be unsure of whether to trust him. When working in a team of people, John holds high expectations for his team and is hard to please. John is good at choosing his team members as he can identify who will accompany him well and who are in need of a leader.

Having attended the same university, John knows Hanssen and Roxanna MacMillan (Hermione Gulliford) before his arrival. McGann stated that Hanssen and Roxanna know John very well and are aware of his weaknesses. Producers wanted to explore the friends' history. McGann and Henry are also friends and have not worked together since attending drama school so they found it amusing that their characters are friends. John initially clashes with Jac as she is not won over by his charm. McGann stated that while the pair are "almost combative", John appreciates her achievements and talent. Upon his arrival, John becomes concerned for Jac's wellbeing, noticing she is facing "mounting pressure".

=== Introduction ===
John is introduced in the nineteenth series episode "Group Animal – Part One", broadcast on 5 December. John first appears in the first of a two-part episode, broadcast in the week commencing 4 December. When John arrives at the hospital, members of staff are waiting for him so they can welcome him to the team. However, he is keen to avoid this and enters in the hospital through the back entrance. Vicki Fower of The Daily Express called John's entrance a display of his "idiosyncratic ways". He asks that a picture of a woman is hung on the wall for him. After arriving, John begins implementing his new changes on the hospital, although is interrupted when the hospital suffers from "one of the biggest threats" they have ever encountered. Harper stated he is "proud" of the character's first episode and said that John's introduction within the episodes creates "the icing on the cake". Duncan Lindsay, writing for the Metro, billed the two-parter as "dramatic and showstopping". On John's introduction, McGann commented, "It's almost like you see in Western movies when the hero turns up to save the village – that's John!" The actor felt that John's introduction showcased how he can work well in a crisis. McGann believed that John's dramatic introduction demonstrated his "technical acumen from the off". He said that John becomes the "hero of the hour" when he helps the situation.

Lindsay (Metro) confirmed that at least one character would die in the episodes. The reporter questioned whether the hospital's staff could "pull together" with John's leadership. In the episode, Jac is shot by someone off screen, leaving her hurt and bleeding. David Brown, writing for the Radio Times, confirmed that John would be involved in saving Jac's life as he attempts to save her. A show spokesperson said that characters' lives would be dramatically changed after the events of the second episode. Lindsay revealed that John would encounter challenges in surgery. McGann explained that John operating on Jac would demonstrate how well he can work in a crisis. In the second episode, John saves Jac's life after emergency surgery and at the end of the episode, John and Sacha Levy (Bob Barrett) discover a dead Raf di Lucca (Joe McFadden) slumped in a lift, having been shot by Fredrik Johansson (Billy Postlethwaite), who was revealed as the shooter. McFadden expressed his excitement at meeting McGann and said he was disappointed to not feature in any prominent scenes with McGann. He commented, "I'd been really excited to work with Paul McGann, but that was our only scene together and I happened to be dead!" McGann said that his introduction was "thrilling to film" as the episodes were "pretty dramatic" and "territory [the producers] thought hard about beforehand".

On 21 November 2017, a trailer and promotional image for John's first episode was released. The trailer, captioned "When darkness falls, look to the light", displays the hospital under pressure from a disaster when John arrives and saves them. Lindsay (Metro) pointed out that the trailer represents that John is "pivotal in saving Holby from what befalls it." Lindsay called the trailer "spooky". Huw Fullerton of Radio Times liked the trailer and branded it "exciting". Fans identified several similarities between the trailer to scenes from the Doctor Who television film, which McGann prominently starred in. Similarities included a doctor appearing scared in a blue light, and a figure running down a shadowy hospital corridor. Fullerton quipped that he expected McGann to "whip out the sonic screwdriver during surgery". Rianne Houghton of Digital Spy reported that fans noticed John repeating the word "regeneration", a Doctor Who term when discussing his motor neurone patient in his first episode.

=== Research project ===
Prior to joining Holby City Hospital, John reversed motor neurone disease in a patient in Portugal through his research into stem cell treatment. His research earned him a positive global reputation for being "a surgical god". McGann explained that the act provided John with "a certain level of fame". He told Allison Jones of Inside Soap that John arrives with a state of respect and allure. He explained that John is conscious of his fame and the effect it has on him. John's fame excites the hospital's staff as they realise that he has specifically chosen to implement his ideas at their hospital. McGann stated that despite John's fame, he has not become arrogant as he believes his surgery has to be repeated on another patient to be proved successful. John's continuous research for his project serves as an awakening for the hospital's staff. McGann confirmed that the research's lack of funding would create a political aspect to the story.

The next candidate chosen for the trial is Fiona Fawcett (Shannon Murray), who suffers from multiple sclerosis which has left her paralysed. Fiona is soon admitted to the hospital as a patient for John's research project. A What's on TV journalist pointed out, "This week, all eyes are on Holby again as Gaskell attempts to change another woman's life." John plans to remove a nerve from Fiona's ankle, "[lace it] with stem cells" and embed it into her spine. As they go into surgery, John is "calm and focused" and he is pleased when the surgery goes well. McGann explained that John is "obsessed" by what his research project could achieve and is pushed by this. Over a month later, Fiona is readmitted with "flu-like symptoms", which worries John. He diagnoses her with an infection, but she does not respond to treatment and her organs begin to fail. John and Roxanna take Fiona to theatre and Roxanna concludes that the implant needs to be removed. John refuses but takes a sample from the implant. He later discovers that the implant caused the infection, but does not tell anyone. McGann explained that John "knows he isn't quite there yet with the trial and he worries it could still go wrong." Fiona's condition deteriorates and she dies. Essie Harrison (Kaye Wragg), who works with John on the trial, begins to blame herself for Fiona's death.

John then treats drug addict Will Harrington (Paul McEwan) and plans to cure him of his drug addiction. Roxanna believes that John is treating Will to "draw attention away" from his research project and is surprised when John asks her to join his research team. Will begins to have doubts about his operation so John tells Roxanna to persuade him to continue with it. Will agrees to surgery, but when he suffers a bleed in theatre, John has to stop the operation, leaving him displeased. After his arrival, John is seen to be visiting to a comatose woman in Portugal, who he calls "Patient X". This is explored in the series 20 episode "Bubble Wrap". In Lisbon, John promises the patient that she will "have a life again". In Holby, John decides to treat Mara Sandhurst (Lizzie Clarke), who is paralysed, in a bid to prove that his procedure works. Mara develops an infection and despite Roxanna's advice to postpone the surgery, John decides to continue with the operation and takes "big risks to ensure it's a success." John returns to Lisbon where the truth about "Patient X" is explained.

== Reception ==
Aspects from the character's primary storyline received three nominations at the 2018 Digital Spy Reader Awards: the storyline, billed "Gaskell's reign of terror", came in eleventh place in the "Best Soap Storyline" category with 3.4% of the total votes, while John murdering Roxanna came in eighth place in the category "Biggest OMG Soap moment" and in last place in the "Most devastating Soap Death" category.

Victoria Wilson of What's on TV described John as a "respected surgeon", while a reporter from The Irish News called him a "high-flying neurosurgeon". Brown (Radio Times) thought John appeared "heroic". Fower (The Daily Express) labelled John "a star surgeon" and an "enigmatic doctor", while Jones (Inside Soap) described him as a "surgical supremo" and a "renowned neurosurgeon". She also branded John's first episodes unmissable. Fullerton (Radio Times) found McGann's casting to be "pretty exciting news". Lindsay (Metro) said that John's introduction was "long awaited". He also called the two-parter episode "shocking and unmissable".

What's on TV's David Hollingsworth named John's first episodes as his "pick of the best shows" for 5 December. He gave the episodes a four out of five star rating. He noted, "There's also a new face on the wards, Professor John Gaskell, played by Paul McGann, who comes with a reputation for achieving what was thought to be impossible." Stacia Briggs of Eastern Daily Press also included John's first episode in a list of TV highlights for the week commencing 2 December, naming it the highlight for 5 December.

Brown (Radio Times) believed it was "only a matter of time before Paul McGann turned up as a surgeon on Holby City" following his previous roles. The reporter felt there was "too much build-up" to John's introduction and said he appeared to be "'Jesus' in the eyes of his patients". Motor neurone disease charity, the Motor Neurone Disease Association, received several complaints about John curing the disease and said the storyline is "hugely misleading" and "upsetting to many people". They stated that show researchers had not contacted them for any advice on how to handle the storyline. A writer for Soap World branded John a "corrupt doctor".
