= The Man Who Sold the World =

The Man Who Sold the World may refer to:

- The Man Who Sold the World (album), a 1970 album by David Bowie
  - "The Man Who Sold the World" (song), the album's title track
- "The Man Who Sold the World" (Life on Mars), 2008 episode of Life on Mars
- "The Man Who Sold the World" (Holby City), 2017 episode of Holby City

== See also ==
- "The Men Who Sold the World", an episode of Murdoch Mysteries
