= Group Animal =

- Holby City episodes
- A promotional image for the episodes
- Episode nos.: Series 19; Episodes 61 & 62
- Directed by: Paulette Randall
- Written by: Andy Bayliss
- Original air dates: 5 December 2017 (Part 1); 7 December 2017 (Part 2)
- Running time: 58 minutes (Part 1); 56 minutes (Part 2)

Guest appearances
- Fraser James as David Hopkins; Joe Citro as Ezra Cranham; Daniel Vivian as Patient Zero; Michael Stevenson as Iain Dean; Victor Gardener as Sergeant Taylor; Komal Amin as Reporter

Episode chronology
← Previous "Hiding Places"	Next → "We Need to Talk About Fredrik"
- Holby City series 19

"Group Animal" is a two-part episode of the British medical drama Holby City that served as the 61st and 62nd episodes of the show's nineteenth series, and the 900th and 901st episodes overall. The first part aired on 5 December 2017, and the second on 7 December 2017 on BBC One in the United Kingdom. Both parts were written by Andy Bayliss and directed by Paulette Randall. The plot sees the arrival of Professor John Gaskell (Paul McGann) at Holby City Hospital, shortly before Fredrik Johanssen (Billy Postlethwaite) goes on a shooting spree, which results in the death of Raf di Lucca (Joe McFadden).

Holby City executive producer Simon Harper first teased the two-part storyline in November 2017, saying the characters would face the "hospital's greatest peril yet" and their lives would be changed forever. Details of the plot were withheld, but it was confirmed that McGann would make his debut during the first part. The actor said "Group Animal" was a departure from the show's regular plots. McFadden's departure was also kept a secret by producers, so it would have "maximum impact" on viewers. McFadden filmed his final scenes two months prior to them being broadcast.

The episodes were promoted with a trailer titled "When Darkness Falls Look to the Light". "Group Animal – Part One" was seen by 4.92 million viewers and "Group Animal – Part Two" was watched by 5.19 million. The episodes received mostly positive attention from critics, with one calling the plot "nail-biting, edge-of-seat stuff". Some viewers hoped that Holby City would win awards for the episodes. However, the Motor Neurone Disease Association criticised the show for misleading viewers about a cure for motor neuron disease. The episodes won Best Drama Storyline at the 2018 Inside Soap Awards.

== Plot ==
=== Part one ===
The staff of Holby City Hospital prepare for the arrival of renowned surgeon Professor John Gaskell (Paul McGann), who has used stem cell treatment to reverse motor neuron disease (MND) in a patient. Gaskell brings in a patient with a spindle cell lipoma and he asks Jac Naylor (Rosie Marcel) to join him in surgery. Feeling under pressure to prove herself, Jac removes Oliver Valentine (James Anderson) from his scheduled operation so she can perform it herself, using the opportunity as practice. On AAU, Essie Harrison (Kaye Wragg) expresses her fears to her husband Raf di Lucca (Joe McFadden) that something bad is going to happen when she notices that she has lost her wedding ring. Raf treats a pregnant woman who fell into a lake and discovers that superfetation has occurred during her pregnancy. He safely delivers her triplets and saves her life.

Nurse Donna Jackson (Jaye Jacobs) shows Raf some threatening text messages from Jeremy Warren (Nick Rhys), who blames the hospital for his mother's death. Halfway through the surgery with Gaskell, Jac leaves the theatre as her nerves get the better of her. John encourages her to return and finish the surgery. Afterwards, Jac breaks down in Adrian Fletcher's (Alex Walkinshaw) arms, as her grief over her sister's death and other recent events catch up with her. In the wet lab, Gaskell introduces his MND patient, László Furz, to Essie, Henrik Hanssen (Guy Henry) and Sacha Levy (Bob Barrett). Jac apologises to Ollie and tells Raf that she has decided to leave Holby for good. She gives him her resignation letter to hand to Hanssen, but as she makes her way down the stairs, she is greeted by an anonymous figure, who shoots her and leaves her to die.

=== Part two ===
The power goes off on AAU, plunging the ward into darkness. Raf takes his patient to ITU and another gunshot rings out as the gunman proceeds through the hospital. After being informed of the shooting, Hanssen instigates the major incident procedure and the hospital is sent into lockdown. Sacha finds Jac and brings her into the wet lab, where he, Gaskell, Hanssen and Essie try to save her life. Paramedic Iain Dean (Michael Stevenson) is handed Raf's patient, who is found with a gunshot wound to her leg, and he treats her in an ambulance outside. The gunman reaches AAU and Donna protects a young boy, as he walks through the ward. She calls Ric Griffin (Hugh Quarshie) when a patient suffers a haemorrhage, and he manages to smuggle himself into the hospital to help. Donna tells him that she saw the gunman's face, while Hanssen is also informed of his identity. Sergeant Taylor (Victor Gardener) receives an image of the gunman and is informed that he is specifically targeting hospital staff.

The gunman goes to Darwin, where Ollie, Morven Digby (Eleanor Fanyinka) and Roxanna MacMillan (Hermione Gulliford) are operating on Roxanna's husband David (Fraser James). The gunman shoots Ollie in the head and Roxanna operates to save him. David suffers a cerebral haemorrhage and dies. The gunman is revealed to be Hanssen's son Fredrik Johanssen (Billy Postlethwaite). He makes it onto Keller ward, where he intends to shoot Dominic Copeland (David Ames), but Hanssen interrupts and tries to talk with his son. Fredrik tells Hanssen that he knows he is not part of the family Hanssen has created at the hospital. Hanssen urges Fredrik to put down the gun, but armed police shoot Fredrik and he dies. Essie recognises Raf's patient and Fletch explains that she actually has a shrapnel wound. Essie listens to a voicemail message from Raf, who explains that he has been shot in the jugular and knows he will not make it. Sacha finds Raf's body in the lift, and races to comfort Essie along with Fletch. Ollie and Jac are taken to the ITU, and Sacha gives a statement to the press.

== Production ==
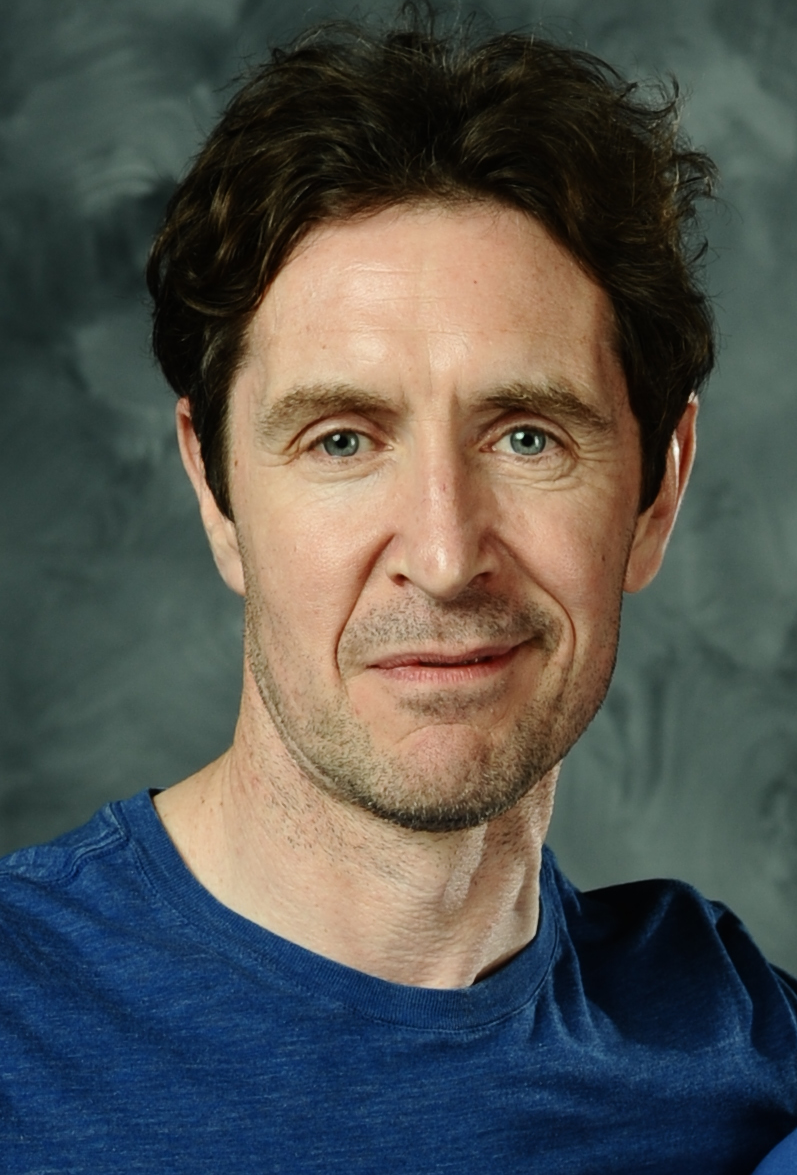
Paul McGann made his debut as John Gaskell in the first part of "Group Animal".

On 21 November 2017, it was announced that Holby City would be airing a two-part episode the following month, that would result in the hospital being "changed forever". Sophie Dainty of Digital Spy confirmed that Paul McGann's character Professor John Gaskell would be introduced, while series regulars Jac Naylor (Rosie Marcel), Ric Griffin (Hugh Quarshie) and Henrik Hanssen (Guy Henry) would feature prominently. The show's executive producer, Simon Harper, stated "You'll see our NHS heroes instinctively rush towards the hospital's greatest peril yet in a story that changes lives forever – and the fact that the episodes introduce Paul, one of our country's most internationally renowned screen talents, is the icing on the cake." Harper praised the cast and crew for their work on the episodes, which he branded "stunningly dramatic and moving". Both episodes were written by Andy Bayliss, directed by Paulette Randall and produced by Sarah Creasey. Details of the storyline were kept secret and did not immediately reveal what peril the hospital and its staff would face.

McGann's casting was announced in April 2017, and Dainty (Digital Spy) reported that his character would be "the saviour of the hour" when he made his debut in December amid a crisis at the hospital. McGann filmed his first scenes during August. His character, Professor Gaskell, is introduced as the pioneer of a new stem cell treatment for motor neuron disease in the first episode. During an interview with Allison Jones of Inside Soap, McGann pointed out that "Group Animal" was a departure from the show's regular plots, and it was something the producers had thought long and hard about beforehand. He found the episodes "thrilling" to film, and said his character has to prove himself immediately. The episodes also feature an appearance from Iain Dean (Michael Stevenson), a paramedic from Holby City's sister show Casualty.

During the first half of "Group Animal", Jac Naylor is seen dealing with her grief at her sister's death and deciding to leave the hospital. However, at the end of the episode, the power goes out and Jac is shot by an unseen assailant, who leaves her to die in a corridor. The cliffhanger led viewers to voice their concern that Marcel was leaving the show, and she later thanked them for their support of her character. At the start of the second episode, Jac is found bleeding from a gunshot wound and Gaskell is forced to perform surgery on her. Shortly after, it is revealed that Hanssen's son Fredrik Johanssen (Billy Postlethwaite) is going on a rampage through the hospital with a rifle. Fredrik shoots Oliver Valentine (James Anderson) in the head, before he is confronted by Hanssen. Fredrik is killed off after explaining that he feels resentment towards his father.

The second episode concluded with the revelation that Raf di Lucca (Joe McFadden) had also been shot and killed. The character's exit was kept out of spoiler articles by producers for "maximum impact". McFadden found Raf's exit to be "quite unexpected" and dramatic. He was pleased that the producers trusted him with the story and thought it would also begin new storylines for the other characters, as they react to Raf's death. He also said, "It is a shocking episode but it's a drama; there's supposed to be drama and conflict. It is probably one of the darkest episodes that I've read but I like that they're pushing boundaries and challenging people and I think it's been done really well." McFadden chose to leave the show after four years, as he believed he had done everything he could with the character. McFadden was appearing on Strictly Come Dancing at the time the episodes aired and he admitted that he found it hard to keep his departure a secret while he was on the show, as he had shot his final scenes two months before they aired. He called his last day on set "a surreal experience". McFadden explained that he had been excited to work with McGann, but in their only scene together he had to lie on the floor and pretend to be dead.

== Promotion and broadcast ==
"Group Animal" was first teased in a September 2017 trailer called "The Reel Before The Storm", which showcased the upcoming Autumn storylines. The episodes were later publicised by a trailer titled "When Darkness Falls Look to the Light", which was released on 21 November 2017. BBC Creative conceived and created the trailer, which was intended to give the show "a shot of adrenaline". A radio campaign and promotional photos were also released. The trailer shows Jac running from "an unknown threat" through a hospital corridor and hiding with Ric and Sacha, while Hanssen cowers from the threat alone. John Gaskell then throws open some doors, which brings light into the corridor, and gestures for them to follow him.

Duncan Lindsay of the Metro thought that this showed John would be Holby's saviour during the event. Lindsay also branded the trailer "spooky", while Huw Fullerton of Radio Times dubbed it "exciting". Viewers noticed various references and comparisons to Doctor Who, in which McGann starred. Fullerton joked, "Five quid says he whips out the sonic screwdriver during surgery..."

"Group Animal – Part One" was broadcast on BBC One on 5 December 2017, with "Part Two" airing two days later on 7 December.

== Reception ==
In its original broadcast, "Group Animal – Part One" was watched by an audience of 4.92 million. "Group Animal – Part Two" saw a small increase in viewership, with 5.19 million tuning in. This was the highest rated episode of Holby City since "The Price We Pay", which aired on 28 February 2017 and attracted 5.34 million viewers.

A reporter for Western Mail chose the first part as one of their "Picks of the Week". They thought McGann's Professor Gaskell had an "irrepressible charm", and wondered how he would fit in as "the team is pushed to its limits". Rianne Houghton of Digital Spy found the first episode to be "a slow-burner", yet it "wasn't short on the drama". What's on TV's David Hollingsworth included the episodes in his "Pick of the Best Shows" feature. He gave them four out of five stars, and called it "a dramatic week for Holby fans". He added, "But as medical history is made, lives saved and new beginnings created, there's also a terrible darkness about to engulf the hospital..."

Sara Wallis from the Daily Mirror observed that the episodes were full of action and thought the sound of gun shots and the hospital lockdown were some of the "most dramatic scenes". She concluded, "It's the greatest threat the hospital has ever experienced, and of course, someone will be left fighting for their life. No spoilers, but expect lots of running, shouting and the usual spattering of blood as our Holby heroes try to save the day." David Brown of the Radio Times thought there was far too much build-up to the shooting. He thought Gaskell was "thrown in at the deep end" during his first day when he had to operate on Jac.

Writing for BT Group, Alex Fletcher, called "Group Animal – Part Two" a "powerful and emotional episode", and added that Raf departed in "heartbreaking fashion." While others expressed their hope that Holby City would win awards for the episodes. The Motor Neurone Disease Association criticised the show for misleading viewers about a cure for motor neuron disease. The charity was contacted by several people who were upset about the storyline, and they requested a response from the BBC.

The "Group Animal" storyline contributed to Holby City's nomination in the Soap and Continuing Drama category at the Royal Television Society Awards in March 2018. The episodes won the Best Drama Storyline category at the 2018 Inside Soap Awards, under the title "The hospital shooting".
