= Guy Self =

- Holby City character
- John Michie as Guy Self
- First appearance: "Sink or Swim"; 26 November 2013
- Last appearance: Episode 1099; 8 March 2022
- Created by: Oliver Kent
- Portrayed by: John Michie
- Spinoff(s): Casualty (2014, 2016)

In-universe information
- Occupation: Consultant neurosurgeon (prev. Chief executive officer)
- Family: Valerie Sturgeon (mother)
- Spouse: Anya Self (deceased)
- Children: Zosia March
- Relatives: Arthur Valentine-Self (grandson)

Guy Self is a fictional character from the BBC medical drama Holby City played by John Michie. He first appeared in the sixteenth series episode "Sink or Swim", broadcast on 26 November 2013. Guy is a consultant neurosurgeon and Holby City Hospital's chief executive officer (CEO) until he resigns from his CEO position. The character also appeared in Holby City's sister show, Casualty. Guy departed in the nineteenth series episode "Song of Self – Part Two", but returned for a nine episode guest stint later in the series. Michie has since reprised the role on three occasions: for one episode in 2018, ten episodes in 2020, and one episode in 2022.

== Creation and casting ==
On 12 July 2013, it was announced that actor John Michie had joined the cast of Holby City as new consultant neurosurgeon Guy Self. Of his casting, Michie said "I'm absolutely thrilled to be joining the cast of Holby City and I'm looking forward to taking on a new challenge. My mum was a nurse and always wanted me to be a doctor not an actor so finally half her wish has come true!" Executive producer Oliver Kent commented that Michie would be involved in some "explosive" storylines following his arrival. Michie was initially contracted for a year and he made his first screen appearance as Guy on 26 November 2013.

To help him prepare for the role, Michie met with a surgeon and watched him operate. The actor told a reporter for the BBC that he spent some time observing the consultant's demeanour, which was "friendly and chatty, but with an unspoken authority". Michie tried to bring those aspects of the consultant's personality to his portrayal of Guy. Michie called the medical terms "complex", but said that having medics in his family made learning the terms easier. He also admitted that he was not squeamish and enjoyed the realism achieved by the prosthetics department.

== Development ==
Unpredictable, assertive and driven, Guy Self is a leader who demands excellence from others. He is a spontaneous, original thinker who seldom lets rules dictate his lust for work and life.

— BBC Online.

In an interview published on BBC Online, Michie explained that Guy is committed to being a neurosurgeon, which makes him ruthless at times. His job gives him "incredible self-belief", although he does not always get things right. Michie thought Guy had a tendency to push himself and his colleagues too hard. He added that women are one of Guy's weaknesses.

In August 2016, Guy's mother Valerie Sturgeon (Brigit Forsyth) was introduced, leading to further exploration of the character's background. Michie was pleased to receive the storyline, as he believed it would finally show the audience why Guy is the way he is. The actor told Inside Soap's Laura-Jayne Tyler, "Hopefully people will have more sympathy for him, rather than see him as a total bastard!" When Guy's mother Valerie is admitted to Darwin, she meets her granddaughter Zosia March (Camilla Arfwedson) for the first time. Zosia always assumed Valerie was dead. Michie explained that Guy deliberately kept his mother away from Zosia, as she subjected him to physical and mental abuse when he was a child. Guy eventually breaks down and tells Zosia the truth about his childhood with Valerie. Michie said filming the scenes with Arfwedson was "a little bit disturbing", as he had to find something in his personal life that made him feel the same as his character.

=== Departure ===
The character departed the show on 15 November 2016. Guy's exit storyline saw him resign from the hospital. Shortly beforehand, he learnt board member Tristan (Jonathan McGuinness) had attacked his daughter Zosia. Guy had been working with and relying on Tristan to get his neuro centre built. Michie told Allison Jones of Inside Soap, "Guy is very vulnerable, like a cornered animal, and he isn't really thinking straight. The centre has been his dream – and for 20 years, he's compromised a lot of his personal life to get it built." Michie said Guy is tempted to let Tristan die when he ends up on his operating table, but his "medical ethics" kick in and he saves Tristan by stopping the bleeding in his brain.

Guy decides to report Tristan's attack on Zosia to the police, but Tristan blackmails Guy by threatening to reveal his suicide attempt. However, Jac Naylor (Rosie Marcel) reports Tristan instead and he goes to the press about Zosia. Guy "cracks" and he trashes his office. He then realises that he needs to leave the hospital for the sake of his mental health. Michie enjoyed filming Guy's last episode and liked how his character made his exit. He thought Guy could make a return in the future, even though things are resolved with "a good ending" in the episode. He said, "I think it's the right time for him to go, but the door has been left open. So maybe he could come back one day and be even worse, or perhaps he'll come back and resolve stuff – who knows?" Michie found it sad saying goodbye to the show and his co-stars, but he added that it was also an exciting time, as he liked moving on to new roles.

=== Returns ===
In June 2017, Laura-Jayne Tyler of Inside Soap confirmed that Michie had returned to filming. Michie later confirmed that he is back for nine episodes. Guy's return aired on 1 August 2017. Guy uses a patient, who needs an expensive surgery, to facilitate his return to Holby. Both Henrik Hanssen (Guy Henry)and Ric Griffin (Hugh Quarshie) are sceptical about his return, as they do not trust Guy. He later blackmails medical director Nina Karnik (Ayesha Dharker) into supporting him, as he knows a big secret about her. Michie commented, "Guy is totally conniving in the way that he manages to wheedle his way back in. It's partly to do with his career, and also to do with his daughter, Zosia, so the kind of things you would expect."

In September 2018, it was revealed that Michie had returned to Holby City once again. Guy returns alongside Mo Effanga (Chizzy Akudolu) in the twentieth series episode "One of Us", broadcast on 20 November 2018. Guy and Mo are called back to Holby City Hospital to help save Jac's life.

In March 2020, it was announced that Michie had reprised his role and would return during the twenty-second series. Guy returns following the privatisation of Darwin ward by external company Kestrel, which Guy has shares in. Executive producer Simon Harper expressed his joy at the character's return, calling Guy "oily" and "Holby's very own neurological Lord of Misrule, who is always guaranteed to sow trouble and strife". Harper also revealed that Guy would clash with Ric, which would create friction on the Acute Assessment Unit (AAU).

Holby City was cancelled in June 2021 after 23 years on air with the final episode due to be broadcast in March 2022. Producers invited multiple former cast members to reprise their roles during the show's final series. Michie reprised his role as Guy in episode 1099, first broadcast on 8 March 2022. His appearance in the episode had been kept under embargo until transmission. Guy returns after being asked by Jac, who wants him to perform a risky life-saving operation on her. He explains that he has already spoken to Max McGerry (Jo Martin) and will not perform the operation.

== Reception ==
Commenting on Michie's casting straight after his role in Coronation Street, a reporter for the Belfast Telegraph thought producers had made it difficult for them and some viewers to continue watching. They wrote, "In one soap the man is a killer and now he is in charge of Holby with the aim of saving lives. When I see him in future episodes – that is if I decide to keep watching – I'll think only of Karl's dirty deeds down in the pub cellar. Giving this role to Michie whom I've no doubt is a fine actor but who is typecast as murdering Karl, makes the task of settling into his new role difficult. I hope he manages it." Flynn Sarler from Radio Times was not impressed with the character's debut. He stated that it was during his second episode that viewers got a "first proper feel for him and it's not all that fuzzy". Sarler bemoaned the character's surgical scenes stating that "Guy doesn't look confident doing it and you don't feel confident watching."

When Guy brought Connie Beauchamp to the Darwin ward, resulting in her clashing with Jac, Jane Simon of the Daily Mirror observed "Was this what Guy secretly intended all along, to remind Jac of just how ambitious she really is? If so, he's even more cunning than we gave him credit for." Simon later noted that Guy had "turned into the worst kind of corporate lizard". A reporter for the Daily Record stated that Guy was "not the most compassionate man in the world".
