= Zosia March =

Fictional character from Holby City

- Holby City character
- First appearance: "The Kick Inside"; 10 September 2013
- Last appearance: Episode 1089; 14 December 2021
- Portrayed by: Camilla Arfwedson
- Spinoff(s): Casualty (2019)

In-universe information
- Occupation: Specialist registrar, cardiothoracics; (prev. foundation doctor, core training doctor)
- Family: Guy Self (father); Anya Self (mother)
- Spouse: Oliver Valentine (2017–present)
- Children: Arthur Valentine-Self
- Relatives: Valerie Sturgeon (grandmother)

Zosia March (also Self and Valentine) is a fictional character from the BBC medical drama Holby City, played by actress Camilla Arfwedson. She first appeared in the series fifteen episode "The Kick Inside", broadcast on 10 September 2013. Zosia arrives at Holby City hospital to start her first year of the Foundation Programme. She has a vested interest in psychiatry and has worked on both Darwin and Keller wards mentored by Elliot Hope (Paul Bradley) and Sacha Levy (Bob Barrett) respectively. She is characterised as a forthright, intelligent and unafraid to challenge the hospital hierarchy. The show soon introduced Zosia's estranged father, Guy Self (John Michie). They share a dysfunctional relationship following the death of her mother. Their feud jeopardises Zosia's career and on one occasion she is thrown off Keller following a rude confrontation. Other storylines revolve around close colleagues Arthur Digby (Rob Ostlere) and Dominic Copeland (David Ames) and romances with Sebastian Coulter (Hadley Fraser) and Oliver Valentine (James Anderson), whom she later married.

The character's most prominent story has been the depiction of bipolar disorder. Zosia begins to drink excessively, use drugs and her behaviour becomes uncontrollable. Through her eventual diagnosis the show explored stigma attached to the illness and treatment involving lithium. The story has received acclaim from mental health charities and organisations. Arfwedson chose to leave the role in 2017, and made her departure in the nineteenth series and returned for one episode in the following series. Arfwedson agreed to reprise the role in 2018 for an extended guest stint and Zosia appeared across two months in 2019. She also made a cameo appearance in 2021. The character has been well received by critics. The Sun's Colin Robertson branded her the "feisty junior doctor". A South Wales Echo journalist praised her integrity regarding patient care. However, one Daily Post reviewer felt that Zosia and Guy's storyline became "far-fetched".

== Casting ==
Camilla Arfwedson attended three auditions to secure the role. Firstly she auditioned for casting directors and then with producers. The third audition was carried out on set wearing scrubs and reciting medical dialogue. The actress was determined to get the part because the character breakdown was fascinating. On 16 July 2013, it was announced that Arfwedson had been cast in Holby City and already began filming. The character was billed as a "plain-speaking F1", while executive producer Oliver Kent said "there are already some very strong opinionated characters in Holby City but none quite like Zosia. Zosia isn’t afraid to tell it how it is so viewers can expect sparks to fly!" Arfwedson added that she was excited to see how Zosia would develop.

== Development ==
=== Characterisation ===
Precociously bright, painfully forthright, Zosia is five steps ahead of the crowd. She isn’t afraid to question hierarchy and she doesn’t feel obliged to fit in, but she is open-minded and fiercely loyal to those she likes. Business-like when it comes to sex, Zosia is also resoundingly private, hiding a troubled past from a prying world.

— BBC Online.

The actress created character traits inspired by people she knew. She also recognises aspects of her own personality in Zosia's persona. Zosia does not suffer fools and behaves in a "sexually voracious" manner. Arfwedson told Benita Adesuyan (Daily Express) that her character "likes to pin men down then discard them as she wishes. She’s very determined and ambitious, and she doesn’t really care about upsetting people.” Arfwedson rose to the challenge of portraying lengthy medical dialogue. She explained that because Zosia is "so bright and so good at what she does", she wanted Zosia to sound as convincing as possible when discussing patient cases.

With a cool and collected manner she does not suffer fools gladly. Arfwedson attributes a "no filter" complex - she does not think about what she says or how other perceive her. In turn this paints her as unfeeling, "very matter of fact" and obsessive about work. She appears almost "robotic" but that is a facade to conceal personal issues. The actress concluded that "I think she has little social awareness and avoids building relationships due to her past experiences." When she debuts on the wards of Holby City, Zosia wants everyone to know how "brilliant" she is.

=== Early career ===
Zosia spends time being mentored by Elliot Hope (Paul Bradley) on Darwin ward. But she soon gets bossy and he tries to remove her from his ward. Zosia forms part of a new team on the hospital's Keller ward consisting of herself, Arthur Digby (Rob Ostlere) and Dominic Copeland (David Ames). Harper said that Arthur is left confused by Zosia. He added that he has to fight for his place more with Zosia and Dominic placed on the ward. The show developed Zosia and Dom into a "best friend" partnership. When Dominic creates a false story of how his mother died, Arthur decides to expose him as a liar. But the truth does not faze Zosia as she aspires to be a psychiatrist, Dominic being a sociopath only makes him more interesting.

The show's series producer Simon Harper announced that viewers would witness a "new side" to Zosia. The change comes following the arrival of Guy Self (John Michie) and it becomes clear that the "driven nature" is a family trait. Guy's arrival also makes Zosia's life unstable. Harper explained that "So far she's been very much in control and is very alpha for a junior doctor, but we're going to learn that there's more complexity and vulnerability behind the polished exterior." Michie labeled the relationship between Zosia and Guy "strange and dyfunctional". Following the death of Zosia's mother, Guy began drinking and had affairs. This distanced the pair and Guy chose to come to Holby City not only to help his career. Michie said "he wants to retrieve the love of his daughter". This task is made extremely difficult because "she blames him for everything thats wrong in her life." When Guy tries to make amends with Zosia she rejects him and makes it clear she only wants a professional relationship with him. But her animosity towards Guy begins to affect her career progression.

The pair do develop some level of respect. As seen in a storyline where they bond over the treatment of a patient named Beth Forbes (Lois Chimimba). Zosia misdiagnoses Beth and Guy realises she has a brain aneurysm and tries to safe her life. However, an Inside Soap columnist reported that Zosia was only taking "baby steps" in her approach to repair their "damaged relationship". But Zosia's rude temperament soon gets her into trouble on the anniversary of her mother's death. Zosia is thrown off the Keller ward after confronting a patient's relative, Owen Saunders (Joe Claflin). She is then "hell-bent on drowning her sorrows". But Owen follows her to the bar and spikes her drink with GHB. Zosia is aware of is this and forces him to drink it causing him to fit.

=== Affair with Jesse Law ===
In April 2014, a new Consultant Anaesthetist Jesse Law is hired on Keller Ward. Jesse is an old friend of Guy's and is already acquainted with Zosia. Don Gilet who plays the character told Katy Moon from Inside Soap that Zosia calls him "Uncle Jesse" and this causes others to tease him. A reporter from the Grimsby Telegraph reported that the inclusion of patient Lindsey Kendal (Claire Sweeney) in Zosia's storyline would help develop a romance story with Jesse. Zosia is accused of not empathising with patients and is referred to as a "grumpy Kate Adie" on a feedback form. Jesse teases her over the event and suggests working on Lindsey's case to develop her rapport with patients.

Arfwedson told a What's on TV reporter that Zosia is fond of Jesse because of his history with Guy. A fondness that develops into a flirtation. Zosia is "terribly efficient" getting the job done which causes her failure to empathise. Her bossy attitude means people are "terrified" of her. But Jesse is the only character within the show able to tease and amuse her. The actress added "[he makes] her laugh and he doesn't give in to her demands, which is even more attractive to her." Zosia tries to deny the attraction but Dom helps esculate her feelings by passing judgement. Zosia decides to seduce Jesse following a series of flirtatious jibes. Afwedson explained "Zosia's a very predatory person - she's very animalistic in her approach and just pounces on Jesse with a kiss. But whether she's making a move on him out of genuine feelings or because of an agenda, who knows..."

The pair continue their affair in secret but it soon becomes problematic. Arfwedson told Katy Moon from Inside Soap that Jesse really understands Zosia. She is played as an "ice queen" yet she just "melts" in his presence. Jesse tries to distance himself from Zosia and she attempts to win him creating negative consequences for her. The actress detailed the scenes in which Zosia sneaks into an important neurological operation to be close to him. But Jesse cannot cope with her distraction and she kisses him. But the move causes "everything to blow up in her face". The episodes which aired in July feature Jesse ending his relationship with Zosia for good when she becomes too serious about their future. But when Guy finds out about their affair he punches Jesse and he leaves Holby City. Arfwedson assessed that Guy could not accept Zosia and Jesse because the latter "is such a player" and has been sleeping with his daughter.

=== Bipolar disorder ===
One of the characters most prominent stories has been her battle with Bipolar disorder. Holby City story producer Kate Hall said that the show decided to explore the storyline when they learned about mental health statistics in medical professions. Those working in the system do not report their illness out of fear of being perceived as weak. Hall described the character of Guy as an "eminent neurosurgeon" who has no time for psychiatry. Hall said it allowed writers to explore the issue of stigma against Zosia's illness from both a professional and familial point of view.

The story begins on-screen when Zosia behaves recklessly following her break-up with Jesse. She treats a cancer patient who reminds her of her dead mother. The experience leaves Zosia upset and she turns to recreational drugs to "numb" her pain. She then has a "wild night out" with Dom and comes into work after. Arthur is shocked by their state and has to cover for them. Ostlere who plays Arthur told Katy Moon (Inside Soap) that Zosia and Dom should be reported to their seniors. But Arthur feels compromised because he cares about them. He added that his socially awkward character was not able to deal with Zosia's outlandish behaviour. Zosia begins to feel unwell, collapses and stops breathing. Arthur breaks hospital rules and steals drugs to revive Zosia. The actor explained that "he's afraid they'll get found out and will all be struck off". The trio make a pact to keep the incident a secret, but Arthur worries that it will happen to Zosia again because she is so "emotionally fragile". Arfwedson branded the scenes "very high octane and very exciting". She likened the entire episode to a "mini-movie" and where Zosia is sweaty, greasy haired and looks bad. The actress concluded that personally it was "terrifying" to watch.

Her behaviour continues, Arfwedson observed the character "spiral out of control" as she puts patients lives at risk, takes drugs and nearly burned down her flat. Zosia's mental state causes real concern for her father Guy. Zosia keeps a video diary where she discusses her thoughts and state of mind. He realises that she needs help and sends her to a rehab clinic. While there she is told that she has bipolar disorder but Guy refuses to believe it. Arfwedson stated that "mentally unstable" Zosia is "terrified of her ability to lose control, but she doesn't want to admit she's got this problem; that scares her more." She fears that her career is ruined and her dreams of being a psychiatrist herself will be unattainable. The actress added "It leaves her wondering: 'How can I understand other people, if I can't understand myself?'" When she is discharged he ignores a psychiatrist's advice that Zosia undergoes more intense treatment. Zosia insists that she is of sound mind to return to work. As the CEO, Guy is able to let her return and even invites her to work alongside him in the operating theatre. But while in there he notices that Zosia is still unwell. She behaves in a "frenzied and disruptive" manner and Guy struggles to concentrate on the procedure and has her removed from the theatre. The actress described her character as having "waves of clarity where she feels almost super-human and everything makes sense". But then she start talking really fast, no one can understand her and she cannot understand why. At this point Guy accepts that he has been in denial and Zosia is ill. He lets Zosia remain at the hospital under the agreement that she takes her medication to control the health.

Zosia begins to take a mood-stabilizing drug called Lithium and some that die from the illness refuse to take the drug. The actress explained that some real life patients with bipolar fear Lithium because they believe it changes their personality negatively. Zosia initially refused the treatment as she shared the same view of Lithium. Guy ensures she takes the medication and she obliges to keep her place at the hospital. Arfwedson wanted writers to write a more positive direction for Zosia following her diagnosis. She claimed "it's important for Holby to show that people with mental illness can be successful, can get help and that drugs aren't necessarily a bad thing."

Arfwedson found it "absolutely exhausting" to portray the condition. She admitted it was hard to get out of character because when she got home she would be learning lines for the following day. To avoid feeling manic herself, she would socialise, meditate and do yoga to forget about Zosia. The storyline had positive outcomes for viewers. People with the condition contacted the actress to credit her portrayal with saving their lives. Arfwedson said she found it "quite moving" to think she was making a difference in real life.

=== Friendship with Arthur Digby ===
One of Zosia's most prominent friendships has been with fellow trainee doctor Arthur. He lacks social skills and finds Zosia's personality difficult to deal with, but they both care about each other. They work closely together on Keller ward alongside Dom. In 2015, Producer Simon Harper decided to split up the trio having Zosia move to Darwin, Arthur to AAU and Dom staying on Keller. Harper said it was a difficult decision to make and it was discussed at length with executive producer Oliver Kent. But Harper wanted to tell stories reflecting real medical careers. He noted that "as they mature and progress, [they] would go on to their separate disciplines and wards [...] What's great about the changes is that gives them different stories." He promised that the characters would continue to share scenes as they live together in a shared flat.

Arthur is diagnosed with terminal cancer. Arfwedson said that her fictional counterpart cannot cope with his illness. She feels like a "spectator" watching on and unable to solve his problems. It really affects Zosia and she keeps her feelings hidden because she is so scared about Arthur's health. Having lost her mother and being unaware how advanced her cancer was, Zosia feels unequipped to deal with his prognosis and does not support him enough. Arthur's condition deteriorates and Zosia begins to unravel and it affects her work. The actress explained that Zosia is left fearing Arthur's illness will trigger a bipolar episode. She worries that if she fully acknowledges her best friend's condition then "she'll spiral out of control." Ostlere said that his character's death would create an interesting story for Zosia.

=== Relationship with Oliver Valentine ===
Zosia begins working with specialist registrar Oliver Valentine (James Anderson). A writer from Inside Soap assessed that there was a "mutual hatred" between the characters from the moment they met. They disagree over patient care and clash during surgery. The duo have to set aside their difference to avoid compromising patient's treatment. Despite their initial dislike the two character share more screen time and bond. They develop banter and a fun working relationship. A new psychiatrist, Sebastian Coulter (Hadley Fraser), arrives at the hospital and asks Zosia for a date. She agrees and they continue to spend time together. This creates a "love triangle" scenario and Oliver and Seb compete for her attention.

Arfwedson told Allison Jones (Inside Soap) that she had fun working on the storyline with Anderson and Fraser. She explained that her character wants to see where her relationship with Seb could go. She views him as "articluate, good-looking and clever". But as she spends more time in his company she finds him controlling and selfish and makes the relationship more about him. Oliver does not seem a good match for Zosia in theory. He is "miserable" and "has a lot of baggage" following the death of his wife Tara Lo (Jing Lusi). But they share a good working relationship and she "gets a thrill out of their banter". The actress added "they are so harmonious on the wards that eventually, they might start to realise there could be something more to it." Arfwedsen was glad to receive the storyline because she wanted Zosia to find love and move on from her troubles with a "positive figure within the hospital". Ultimately it would help her excel in her medical speciality.

Holby City producer Simon Harper told Daniel Kilkelly from Digital Spy that Zosia and Oliver have a "delicious chemistry". He was keen to have the story play out slow-paced to create anticipation for their eventual relationship. But noted that there was a danger viewers could become tired of waiting. He was happy with the success the pairing had already become. He noted that viewers on social media named them "Zollie" and branded it "one of the most successful romances we've ever played on the show."

They eventually get together but writers planned to create fresh relationship dramas for the pair. Zosia is happy with her relationship and wants to plan their future. She asks for a key to Oliver's flat but she is met with optimism from him. Then a pregnant patient Melissa Peters (Faye McKeever) arrives on Darwin ward. She recalls having a one-night stand with Oliver and claims he is the baby's father. They later find out Melissa has lied and Oliver is not the father. But the scenario damages Zosia and Oliver's relationship. When Zosia is named in the local newspaper as having bipolar disorder she is eager to prove it will not affect her surgical abilities. As her senior Oliver decides to pull rank and have her removed from a major operation. When she finds out the truth she ends their relationship. Arfwedson said that it was "very sad" because they love each other, but Zosia cannot move on from his betrayal. She believed Oliver made the correct decision, describing her character's mood as "explosive" and "not in a good place". She is "most hurt" that Oliver spoke to his colleague, Specialist registrar Mo Effanga (Chizzy Akudolu) privately about her state of mind, rather than discuss it with her first. Arfwedson thought it would be a "shame to lose" the on-screen romance as they have "a lovely partnership". Zosia decides to give Oliver another chance. She tracks him down to a bar but finds him drunken and kissing staff nurse Cara Martinez (Niamh Walsh). The actress described Zosia's shock "As far as Zosia's concerned that really is the end for them. It’s very sad."

The pair later reunite and marry in the episode titled "Veil of Tears – Part One". They face a number of issues including Zosia's disapproving father Guy, who she bans from the ceremony for trying to sabotage things. He then gets drunk and smashes the guest table and wedding cake inside their reception room.

=== Departure and returns ===
On 10 September 2017, Arfwedson announced her departure from Holby City on her social media account, after appearing in the serial for four years. She made her final appearance as Zosia on 26 September. Of her decision to leave, Arfwedson said "It's been a real honour to play Zosia and to work at Holby. I have loved playing her with all her ups and downs, battles with her mental health and close relationships. She has been inspiring and challenging in equal measure. A truly wonderful part to play." The actress hoped that her character could return to the hospital in the future. Following her departure, Arfwedson told Laura-Jayne Tyler of Inside Soap that she had been asked to return in October to film one episode. She returned on 2 January 2018.

On 19 September 2018, it was announced that Arfwedson had agreed to reprise the role of Zosia for an extended guest appearance. Holby City's Executive Producer Simon Harper said that the character was returning because of "popular demand" from the show's viewers. She is scheduled to return during February 2019. When Zosia returns to the ward she has a secret and feels lonely. Arfwedson told Laura-Jayne Tyler from Inside Soap that Zosia has worked hard at Yale but feels isolated and alone in the United States. She explained that "ultimately she's searching for stability" by returning to Holby. Jac is not pleased to see Zosia working back at the hospital. The actress said that "Zosia is like a protege to Jac, so her being back after spreading her wings and escaping her controlling father doesn't go down well." In addition producers decided to keep Zosia and Oliver's current relationship status vague because Anderson had left the show. There are hints that Zosia has had an affair with an American but she still loves Oliver. They are on speaking terms but they are unsure of how his brain damage has progressed. Arfwedson did feel that her character had grown up while she had been away. She praised Zosia for being a role model for those suffering with bipolar disorder because her placement at Yale demonstrates that you can be successful. It emerges that Zosia's secret is that she is expecting a baby and five months pregnant when she returns. Following her return, Arfwedson appears as Zosia in a crossover two-part episode with Holby City's sister show, Casualty, originally broadcast in March 2019.

The character departed two months later in the series 21 episode "North and South", originally broadcast on 16 April 2019. Having been secretive about her pregnancy and avoiding having baby scans, Zosia admits that she plans to have the baby adopted. However, when she suffers a fall, Zosia has a scan confirming the baby's good health. In the aftermath, Zosia decides to return to America to raise the child and it emerges that Oliver is the father of the baby. As she leaves, Zosia speaks to Oliver, hinting that the couple could reconcile. The character's departure was not announced beforehand and it was confirmed following its broadcast that she had left the show again.

Arfwedson reprised the role again in 2021 for a cameo appearance linked to Anderson's exit from the series. She features in the show's 1089th episode as part of the twenty-third and final series, originally broadcast on 14 December 2021. Zosia appears in a video call with Oliver as he plans to join her and their son, Arthur, in America. The return of two former characters was reported prior to the episode's broadcast, but Zosia's identity was not revealed until transmission.

== Reception ==
"The wards of Holby General haven’t been the same since Zosia March arrived two and a half years ago. The pretty, bipolar surgeon with a tendency to shoot from the hip has breathed more life into stuffy Darwin ward than a surgical heart pump."

— Vicki Power of the Daily Express, on Zosia's impact on the show

The Daily Express' Adesuyan said that sweet was not a word anyone would use to describe the "forthright junior doctor" Zosia. Jamie Downham writing for Yahoo! said "super-smart junior doctor" who arrived on the Darwin ward with "in all her nightmarish glory". Trinity Mirror columnist Jane Simon said that Elliot had his hands full with Zosia and called her "way too clever for her own good". She also described her as "scarily confident, straight talking to the point of rudeness and not afraid to ask for what she wants." Simon later noted a rise in neurological and psychiatry stories following Zosia and Guy's introductions. She branded her a "wannabe psychiatrist" and "stroppy junior doctor" - a Daily Mirror reporter went with "straight-talking".

A writer from STV.tv said that they could not wait to watch Zosia learn the truth about her mother's death. But a writer from the Welsh Daily Post was not impressed. They quipped "these explanations are getting more far-fetched by the week. I'm just waiting for Guy to tell Zosia that her mother wasn't really her mother at all, but a secret agent working undercover for MI5." A writer from the South Wales Echo praised Zosia for making it clear where her loyalties lie regarding hospital policy. They also noted that she is willing to risk her reputation to wipe the "self-satisfied smile of Guy's face". A Daily Mirror writer noted that Zosia is ambitious but had "bitten off more than she can chew" when she tried to treat a vulnerable patient in need of psychiatric help. Inside Soap's Laura-Jayne Tyler was happy with Zosia and Jesse's romance. She believed that it served as a good opportunity to see Guy "get a taste of his own medicine".

A representative for Mental Health Support UK stated "due to Holby City being a medical drama, focusing on illnesses, it is not surprising that this representation of an individual coping with bipolar disorder is the most accurate and thought provoking." Harriet Martin of Wessex Scene said that Arfwedson "arguably portrayed the illness with a relatively high degree of accuracy". Zosia's story secured Holby City a nomination for the "Soaps & Continuing Series Award" at the Mind Media Awards 2015. A writer from Mind stated "viewers follow her character through a heart-breaking journey of confusion, denial, treatment and acceptance." In August 2017, Arfwedson was longlisted for Best Drama Star at the Inside Soap Awards. The nomination did not progress to the viewer-voted shortlist.
