= Barons Court Theatre =

Small theatre in London, England

Coordinates: 51.489488°N 0.209474°W

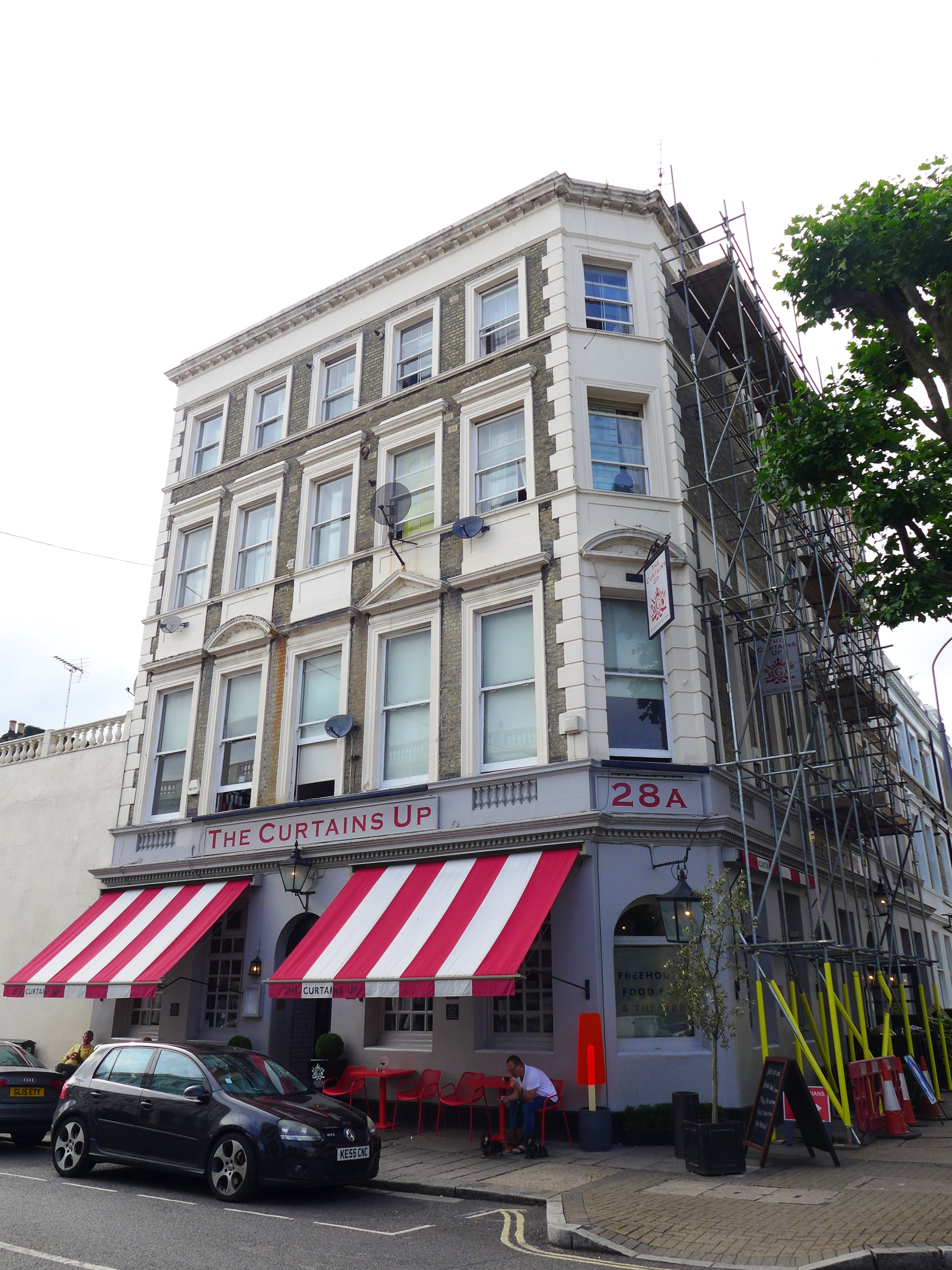
The Curtains Up pub

Barons Court Theatre is a small theatre of 52 cinema-style seats located in the basement of The Curtains Up public house in Comeragh Road in West London. Founded in 1991, the Barons Court Theatre features a programme of short-run plays and afternoon magic shows that are frequently changed.

Ron Phillips was the artistic director at the theatre's inception, and productions at Barons Court Theatre included Sophocles's Antigone, Dostoyevsky's Crime and Punishment, Hardy's Tess of the d'Urbervilles, Ibsen's A Doll's House, Shakespeare's Richard III & Shakespeare's Women. Noted performers who have performed at the theatre include Sara Kestelman in Bitter Fruits of Palestine.

The theatre also hosted The Magic Cavern, a theatre show of magic and illusion, presented by international magician Richard Leigh.

During the COVID-19 pandemic, Barons Court Theatre was closed for over a year. In 2021, artistic director Ron Phillips retired and was succeeded by Sharon Willems, previous artistic director of Kibo Productions.
