= Camilla Arfwedson =

English actress (born 1981)

- Born: Camilla Katrina Arfwedson; 16 October 1981 (age 44); Westminster, London
- Occupation: Actress
- Years active: 2005–present
- Spouse: Jack Hawkins (m. 2019)
- Children: 2

Camilla Katrina Arfwedson (/ˈɑːrvɛdsən/ AR-ved-sən; born 16 October 1981) is an English actress. She is known for her roles as Zosia March in Holby City, and being the poster woman for Secret Escapes in 2012−2013.

== Early life ==
Born in Westminster, London, to a Swedish father and English mother, Arfwedson was brought up in Chelsea and attended the Francis Holland School as a day girl. She then studied Classics at the University of Edinburgh. There, she joined the theatre society, and gained parts in the stage plays: Sore Throats and A Slight Ache both directed by Thom Tuck; Skylight directed by Michael Sophocles; Private Lives directed by Frederic Wake-Walker; Bedroom Farce directed by Simon Yadoo; the speaker in the Vagina Monologues directed by Alice Russell.

== Career ==
Becoming a professional actress upon graduation, Arfwedson has since worked mainly in the theatre, including Portia in the Merchant of Venice, the first touring production of Festen, and the role of Evelyn in the Barons Court Theatre production of Neil LaBute's The Shape of Things directed by Ed Behrens.

Arfwedson's television roles have included parts in Law & Order: UK and Agatha Christie's Marple: Murder Is Easy. Her film roles have included playing Lady Charlotte in The Duchess, and playing Burt Reynolds' daughter in the British comedy film A Bunch of Amateurs.

In 2012, Arfwedson starred in a television commercial for travel website Secret Escapes. Follow-up adverts were also released in 2013. She played Sheriff Angela Carter in Wrong Turn 5: Bloodlines, and in 2013, appeared in the second episode of BBC Three sitcom Way to Go, before joining the cast of BBC One medical drama Holby City.

In 2018, Arfwedson played the young Mrs Ayres in Lenny Abrahamson's film version of the novel The Little Stranger; the later life Mrs Ayres was played in the film by Charlotte Rampling.

== Filmography ==
=== Film ===
Year	Title	Role	Notes
2005	A Waste of Shame	Lucie's Maid	Television film
2007	Sex, the City and Me	Tamara	Television film
2007	Drive In	Woman	Short film
2007	Breath	Emily	Short film
2008	The Duchess	Lady Charlotte	
2008	A Bunch of Amateurs	Amanda Blacke	
2009	Leave	Penelope	Short film
2009	Then, Voyager	Elizabeth	Short film
2012	Wrong Turn 5: Bloodlines	Sheriff Angela Carter	Direct to video
2012	Ideal Wife	Shee	Short film
2014	The Raven Club	Jessica	Short film
2015	Molly Moon and the Incredible Book of Hypnotism	Publicist	
2015	If It Looks Like Love	Pippa	Short film
2018	The Little Stranger	Young Mrs Ayres	
2021	Tom & Jerry: The Movie	Linda Perrybottom	

=== Television ===
Year	Title	Role	Notes
2008	Agatha Christie's Marple	Rose Humbleby	Episode: "Murder Is Easy"
2009	Minder	Henriette Phillips	Episode: "The Art of the Matter"
2009	Law & Order: UK	Laura Todd	Episode: "Alesha"
2010	Lewis	Scarlett Mortmaigne	Episode: "The Dead of Winter"
2011	Pete Versus Life	Helene	Episode: "A Night at the Light Opera"
2013	Way to Go	Kelly	Episode: "The Business End of Things"
2013	Jo	Charlotte Dumas	Episode: "Invalides"
2013	Air Force One is Down	Irena	Miniseries, 2 episodes
2013–2019, 2022	Holby City	Zosia March / Zosia Self	Series regular, 182 episodes
2014	Wireless	Emma Jay	Television series short
2017	Silent Witness	Policewoman #2	Episode: "Covenant"
2018	Midsomer Murders	Serena Madison	Episode: "Till Death Do Us Part"
2019	Casualty	Zosia Self	Crossover - 1 episode
2020	The Stranger	Sally Prentice	Episode: "Series 1, Episode 4"
2020	Ghostwriter	Shirl Holmes	Episode: "The Case of the Missing Ghost"
2021	MacGyver	Sofia Walker	Episodes: "Quarantine + N95 + Landline + Telescope + Social Distance" & "Royalty + Marriage + Vivaah Sanskar + Zinc + Henna"
2022	The Lincoln Lawyer	Gwen	Episode: "Twelve Lemmings in a Box"

=== Theatre ===
Year	Title	Role	Venue	Notes
1999	Bash: Latter-Day Plays	Woman	Douglas Fairbanks Theater, New York City & Almeida Theatre, London	with "Imperial House Productions"
2001	A Slight Ache	Flora	Bedlam Theatre, Edinburgh	with "University of Edinburgh"
2001	Bedroom Farce	Delia	Bedlam Theatre, Edinburgh	with "University of Edinburgh"
2002	Sore Throats	Judy	Bedlam Theatre, Edinburgh	with "University of Edinburgh"
2003	Built of Strange Bricks	Rebecca	Bedlam Theatre, Edinburgh	with "University of Edinburgh"
2004	Square One	Diane	Etcetera Theatre, London	
2005	The Shape of Things	Evelyn Ann Thompson	Barons Court Theatre, London	
2006	The Vagina Monologues	Speaker	Bedlam Theatre, Edinburgh	with "University of Edinburgh"
2006	Festen	Pia	UK Tour	with "Number 1 Tour"
2010	Antony and Cleopatra	Octavia/Iras	Nuffield Theatre, Southampton	
2011	The Merchant of Venice	Portia	Derby Theatre, Derby	with "Derby Live"

=== Video games ===
Year	Title	Role	Notes
2021	Halo Infinite	Spartan Sigrid Eklund	
2023	Hi-Fi Rush	Mimosa	

== Awards and nominations ==
Year	Award	Category	Work	Result
2015	National Television Awards	Most Popular Newcomer	Holby City	Nominated
