= Hermione Gulliford =

English actress

Hermione Valentine Gulliford is an English actress, born in Somerset. She trained at the Central School of Speech and Drama, graduating in 1994.

She has worked in the theatre, appearing in The Merchant of Venice, Othello, and A Midsummer Night's Dream with the Royal Shakespeare Company and as Lady Capulet in Romeo and Juliet at Shakespeare's Globe in London in 2019.

Television credits include one episode of The IT Crowd and the roles of Kim in Oktober, Sophie in Jane Eyre, Hermione Trumpington-Bonnet in Monarch of the Glen, Carol Emerson in Heartbeat, and a recurring role as Elizabeth Addis in the final series of Foyle's War (2015).

On 2 April 2013, she appeared as neurosurgeon Roxanna MacMillan in Holby City, recurring until 26 April. Gulliford reprised the role as a regular character from October 2017 to 25 September 2018.
