= Holby City series 20 =

Holby City
- Series 20
- The Series 20 Cast Image
- No. of episodes: 52

Release
- Original network: BBC One; BBC One HD
- Original release: 2 January – 27 December 2018

Series chronology
- ← Previous; Series 19 Next → Series 21

The twentieth series of the British medical drama television series Holby City began airing on BBC One in the United Kingdom on 2 January 2018, and concluded on 27 December 2018. The series consists of 52 episodes; a decrease from the previous series. Kate Hall serves as the series producer, while Simon Harper continued his role as the executive producer. Fifteen cast members reprised their roles from the previous series. Four actors departed during the series, including long-standing cast member James Anderson (Oliver Valentine). Catherine Russell reprised her role as Serena Campbell from episode six. Throughout the series, multiple characters returned for guest stints, including Zosia March (Camilla Arfwedson), Bernie Wolfe (Jemma Redgrave) and Mo Effanga (Chizzy Akudolu).

== Episodes ==
| No. overall | No. in series | Title | Directed by | Written by | Original release date | Viewers (millions) |
|---|---|---|---|---|---|---|
| 904 | 1 | "The Prisoner" | Jennie Darnell | Ed Sellek | 2 January 2018 | 4.65 |
Ric arrives in prison to begin his remand sentence for the assault of Jeremy. He meets popular prisoner Dillon, who tells Ric that he will look after him, but when Ric befriends Danny, a fellow prisoner who let another prisoner die, Dillon warns Ric to stay away from Danny. Danny is found injured and requiring urgent medical care; Ric secretly treats Danny, and when Dillon finds out that Ric has befriended and treated Danny, he warns Ric that his family is in danger. Back at the hospital, Ollie regains consciousness. Zosia returns to support Ollie, but he rejects her. Roxanna informs Ollie that they need to operate on him to remove the bullet in his brain. The operation goes wrong and the bullet is not removed. Zosia ponders leaving Yale to look after Ollie, but she soon realises that he is better off without her, and leaves again.
| 905 | 2 | "Ready or Not" | Francis Annan | Robert Goldsbrough | 9 January 2018 | 4.88 |
Jac insists she is ready to return to work, and is determined to prove her injuries are not affecting her. John requests Jac's help operating on a patient of his and she agrees to help him. At the same time, Professor Cornell arrives on Darwin to discuss former surgeon Connie Beauchamp's post-operative care plan with Jac. When Professor Cornell begins to intervene with Jac and John's patient, Jac is unimpressed. As she prepares to operate on her patient, Jac's stitches undo, so she orders Frieda to stitch her back up, before successfully completing the operation. Donna and Sacha are concerned when Ric's prison inmate, Danny, is admitted to AAU after being beaten up. Danny tells Sacha that Ric wants him to visit him in prison. Sacha attends the visit and promises to help Ric get out of jail. Essie learns Raf has left a share of his inheritance money for her. She donates the money to John's research project.
| 906 | 3 | "There by the Grace of..." | Francis Annan | Johanne McAndrew and Elliot Hope | 16 January 2018 | 4.70 |
John asks Essie to join him in the search for a candidate for his research project. Sacha questions Essie about investing in John, making her wonder whether she has made the right decision. Essie works alongside John on a young patient - the experience helps her realise she is fully committed to the project. Donna learns Ric is in the prison infirmary, and worries for his safety. She phones Ric, who tells her that he has a virus and does not want to see any more visitors until further notice. Fletch ramps the hospital's security up another level by preparing for the installation of a knife arch. When a delivery of Raf's vinyl records arrive on Darwin for Fletch, he becomes distracted. Essie tells Jac that she secretly sent them to Fletch, and when Fletch tells Jac he is planning to finish the collection and sell them off, she takes one of the records and leaves with it.
| 907 | 4 | "Hanssen Is as Hanssen Does" | James Larkin | Joe Ainsworth | 23 January 2018 | 4.12 |
Sara returns to Holby on the day of Raf's memorial reveal. Hanssen has flashbacks to the day Fredrik Johansson (Billy Postlethwaite) rampaged; he struggles to stabilise his emotions when he sees Sara. Sara tells Hanssen she is moving back to Sweden - Hanssen asks Sara to give his grandson a coin in memory of Fredrik, but Sara refuses to take it. At the memorial, Hanssen walks off the stage whilst giving a talk, as he begins to emotionally breakdown. Jac is determined to maintain her high status on Darwin, but her leg gives way in theatre. Jac's patient reveals that he has to use a walking stick because after suffering a dislocated hip he did not attend his physiotherapy sessions, this helps Jac realise she needs to allow herself time to heal. Lofty's gran, Sheilagh, is admitted to AAU, and is treated by Dom. Sheilagh notices an obvious chemistry between Dom and Lofty. Meena joins John's research project as a student representative.
| 908 | 5 | "One Day at a Time" | James Larkin | Isla Gray | 30 January 2018 | 4.53 |
John braces himself as the day of his clinical trial arrives. Knowing that both his and the hospital's reputation could potentially be ruined, John confidently greets his paraplegic patient, and prepares her for surgery, which he hopes will see her be able to walk again. The surgery is a success and his patient regains sensation in her legs. With Meena involved in John's trial, Nicky is jealous. Sacha treats a patient with suspected gastroenteritis, and when the patient's condition worsens, Nicky get involved, suspecting the patient is actually suffering a tumour. Her suspicions are quickly confirmed by Sacha, who commends Nicky for her successful diagnosis and trust gained from her patient. Jac and Frieda treat a patient reluctant to have major surgery to prolong his life. The pair work together and eventually manage to persuade their patient to have surgery. Jac is impressed by Frieda and her involvement in the patient. Fletch sets up martial art classes as he continues to ensure the security of the staff at the hospital is of top priority.
| 909 | 6 | "Not Your Home Now" | Baff Akoto | Patrick Homes | 7 February 2018 | 4.02 |
Serena returns to Holby and agrees to temporarily take over as the hospital's CEO after Hanssen steps down; she later decides to remain at the hospital indefinitely when Jac questions Serena's dedication to the hospital and Serena witnesses the effects recent events have had on staff. Ric is admitted to AAU with a stab wound, leaving Donna distressed. Serena learns that Ric was absent from the hospital at the time Elaine Warren died; he was calming Jason down at her house after Jason attacked his ex-girlfriend, who was trying to steal Elinor's belongings. Oliver becomes increasingly frustrated at the speed of his recovery and pushes himself too far during a physiotherapy session. He begins vomiting but does not tell Roxanna. Fletch searches for the last rare vinyl in order to complete Raf's collection. Jac looks for the vinyl she took from Raf's collection in hopes that she can impress Fletch by finding it and giving it to him, but when she locates the vinyl, it has been vandalised by Emma.
| 910 | 7 | "Precipice" | Baff Akoto | Tony Higgins | 13 February 2018 | 4.50 |
Roxanna has the bullet in Ollie's brain compared to the bullets used in Fredrik's rampage and discovers that there were traces of manganese on the bullet. Roxanna learns Ollie is being poisoned by the bullet in his brain, so she attempts to persuade Ollie to remove it. Ollie grows frustrated at Roxanna and begins insulting her, telling her she should have been shot. John steps in and encourages Ollie to have the operation under Roxanna's supervision; Ollie agrees to the operation. Jason and Serena are both shocked to learn that Jason's girlfriend, Greta, is pregnant. Fletch treats a patient with OCD while keeping an eye on Evie, who he has brought into work to prevent her going on a date. Jac buys Raf's missing rare vinyl for Fletch. Dom gets drunk at the pub and kisses Lofty.
| 911 | 8 | "Hard Day's Night" | Daikin Marsh | Michelle Lipton | 20 February 2018 | 4.28 |
Nicky wakes up in the on-call room. She is hungover, handcuffed to the bed and unprepared for her first night shift. Meena helps free Nicky from the bed, but tells her they are not friends after how Nicky treated her whilst on their drinking spree. Nicky finds a way to rebuild her friendship with Meena. She also has to deal with new registrar Zav, who she met while partying. Zav works alongside Nicky to help an overweight patient come to terms with the revelation that she is nine months pregnant. As Zav goes to perform an emergency caesarean on the patient, Nicky calls Serena, failing to believe that Zav is capable of performing the procedure. Zav performs the procedure successfully and Serena is unimpressed with Nicky. Donna confesses to Serena that she attempted to forge Ric's signature on patient notes to get him out of jail, but was caught by John. Fletch learns Jac was planning to leave Holby before she was shot. He tries to talk to Jac but she pushes him away.
| 912 | 9 | "Ache" | Daikin Marsh | Martin Jameson | 28 February 2018 | 4.29 |
Jac's pain reaches an all-time high. Frieda steps in and offers Jac a temporary solution with some strong medication, but tells Jac she has to be honest with her staff about her condition. When Jac makes a mistake with a patient's file, she tells Frieda she may lead a big operation if she gives her a dose of the medication and keeps quiet about it. Frieda gives Jac the medication, but Jac dupes her and performs the operation herself instead. Frieda is deeply unimpressed and warns Jac no one will be there for her when the medication wears off. Roxanna believes that experimental treatment could help Ollie's recovery. John is sceptical the treatment will work, and Serena is reluctant to dedicate funding to Roxanna's proposal, so she consults Hanssen. Dom is determined to help make Sheilagh as comfortable as possible after receiving her diagnosis.
| 913 | 10 | "Square One" | Toby Frow | Kathrine Smith | 6 March 2018 | 4.30 |
John and Essie are thrown by the return of former paraplegic patient Fiona, who was John's patient for his clinical trial. Fiona cannot walk anymore and is showing signs of an infection; she then dies. John learns that Fiona died as a result of the clinical trial, but lies to Essie, telling her it was the infection that killed Fiona. John is frustrated by Fiona's death, and with Roxanna's help he gains a seat on the Trust board as director of medicine. Serena is determined to help Ric after visiting him in prison and realising he is beginning to lose hope. She meets with Fletch and Donna as they try to track down any external staff who worked on the ward on the day Elaine Warren died. Jac returns to work, with her cheery attitude confusing staff. Frieda reminds Jac the medication will wear off, but Jac ignores Frieda, ensuring their secret is kept.
| 914 | 11 | "The L Word" | Toby Frow | Katie Douglas | 13 March 2018 | 4.36 |
Donna and Fletch desperately seek down Amira Zafar as they attempt to piece together the events of the day Elaine Warren died. They find Amira, but learn she is not a nurse anymore and does not wish to have any involvement in Ric's case. Her mind is soon changed by Donna who encourages Amira to stand up in court and give her account of what happened. Ollie begins his new therapy treatment with Roxanna and it proves to be a success in helping Ollie recover. Roxanna also grieves for David as she truly accepts his death. Dom's loyalties to Lofty are tested when he is drawn into Sheilagh's care plan. Lofty soon realises that Dom only has good intentions for Sheilagh, and the pair continue to strengthen their relationship.
| 915 | 12 | "No Matter Where You Go, There You Are – Part One" | David Innes Edwards | Patrick Homes | 20 March 2018 | 4.56 |
Ric takes the stand as his court hearing arrives. With the events on the day of Elaine Warren's death revisited, Amira and Donna stand up in court to give their account of the events on the day of Ric's death. A series of flashbacks expose the reality of what happened, with Ric leaving the ward to help Jason, and Amira misunderstanding what Ric had asked her to do. As the evidence builds Ric takes to the stand to give his events of the day. The jury reach a decision and prepare to announce Ric's fate. Ollie discharges himself, but soon returns to the hospital after falling over at home and hitting his head. Jac is offered four weeks holiday by the Trust; Serena encourages Jac to take time off, but she is reluctant. With her pain affecting her work performance again, Frieda decides to tell Fletch about Jac's condition, so Jac takes the holiday and leaves.
| 916 | 13 | "No Matter Where You Go, There You Are – Part Two" | David Innes Edwards | Andy Bayliss | 27 March 2018 | 4.18 |
Essie is dissatisfied with the circumstances surrounding the death of John's trial patient, Fiona, and decides to investigate her death deeper. She finds John's dictaphone and listens to most, but not all, of the recording. As a result, Essie blames herself for Fiona's death, and is under the impression that either herself or Meena must leave the trial, so leaves after concluding it is safer for her to go than Meena. Hanssen returns to the hospital to assist with a major operation. Ollie torments Hanssen, which results in Hanssen breaking down and snapping at Ollie, telling him he can never be a doctor again. After realising he will never be the same again, Ollie leaves Holby, while Hanssen acknowledges he still needs to come to terms with Fredrik's death. With Jac gone, Frieda and Fletch work together to treat her patients during a night shift. Ric is acquitted.
| 917 | 14 | "Tete a Tate" | Julie Edwards | Joe Ainsworth | 3 April 2018 | 4.41 |
Abigail Tate, the hospital's new CEO, arrives for her first shift. She heads to Darwin ward to help Fletch out on a patient he is treating, but Fletch is unimpressed with the treatment plan that Abigail has prepared for their patient, and sets her the challenge of proving she is as competent as Jac is. Ric is annoyed to learn that the hospital's Trust board only want him treat patients with minor injuries to ease him back into his job. John takes on a new controversial case with a patient, but Roxanna is not convinced that his reasons to take the patient on are genuine, as she believes he is using the patient to try and rebuild his reputation.
| 918 | 15 | "Tate Gallery" | Samantha Harrie | Joe Ainsworth | 10 April 2018 | 4.05 |
Roxanna is excited to begin working with John on his stem cell project. However, she learns that John has been keeping vital information behind former patient Fiona's death from the public, and figures that he let Essie take the blame when it could have been the stem cell implant which caused her death. Despite her knowledge of the situation, Roxanna continues to work alongside John, and he places her at the forefront of their new stem cell project. Ric's gym partner, Kit McNeil, returns to the hospital with stage four sarcoma involving the right kidney. Serena intends to perform surgery on Kit, but Ric is soon called into the theatre and assist with the successful operation, despite being told he is still not allowed to perform surgery. Abigail finds out and is less than impressed. Fletch suspects that Abigail is not giving a patient the attention they deserve, and her negligence towards her patient comes at a cost when she later collapses outside the hospital.
| 919 | 16 | "New Ain't All It's Cracked Up to Be" | Steve Brett | Nick Fisher | 17 April 2018 | 4.40 |
Nicky begins her new rotation on Darwin ward, and Frieda is assigned as her mentor. Keen to impress Frieda, Nicky helps her with the complicated diagnosis of a patient. John is impressed by Nicky and invites her to watch him perform an operation in theatre. Meena is jealous of the opportunity that John has given Nicky, having felt ignored by John all day, so when Nicky asks Meena to tell John that she won't be watching his work in theatre, Meena decides to not tell him. John invites Meena to watch his operation instead, and when Nicky realises that Meena decided not to tell John she would not be attending his procedure, the pair fall out, though later reconcile. Zav is placed in charge of Sheilagh's care by Serena, who teaches him a lesson in humility.
| 920 | 17 | "The Way We Were" | Steve Brett | Becky Prestwich | 24 April 2018 | 4.27 |
Frieda's former boyfriend, Roman, arrives at her flat unexpectedly, surprising her. Roman is injured and requires medical attention. Frieda is left having to choose between helping Roman or her patient, so she makes Nicky go to the flat to treat Roman. Nicky successfully stitches Roman's wound together, impressing Frieda. Roman leaves and Frieda is grateful to Nicky, offering her tips on how to improve her suturing skills. Dom is horrified when the patient he is treating, who has hepatitis C, is using Isaac for her new novel on domestic abuse. Dom performs surgery on his patient, but as he loses focus in theatre, he ends up stabbing himself with a needle. A blood sample is taken from Dom afterwards.
| 921 | 18 | "Headstrong" | Christiana Ebohon-Green | Johanne McAndrew and Elliot Hope | 1 May 2018 | 4.07 |
Fletch is thrown by the unexpected arrival of Mikey at the hospital during a busy shift, who tries to make Fletch realise whether his priorities lie with his family or his job. Abigail is unimpressed by Mikey's lurking on the hospital and confronts Fletch over it, which forces the pair to discuss their working relationship. Nicky is determined to prove herself to Abigail by assisting her with a patient's complicated case, but with her financial situation getting worse, Nicky is forced to get the issue sorted, causing her to miss the start of the patient's operation and Abigail to become annoyed by Nicky's lack of commitment to the patient. Hanssen helps Zav talk about his emotions when his past career in show-business becomes knowledge.
| 922 | 19 | "Bubble Wrap" | Sean Glynn | Ed Sellek | 8 May 2018 | 3.92 |
John faces a race against time to find a cure for his secret new trial patient in Portugal when they begin deteriorating. With Abigail hounding him, John decides that he must take a big risk if he is to save himself once again. Dom learns that he has hepatitis C, which makes him question whether he can continue to become a surgeon, and whether he should stay in his relationship with Lofty. He later realises that he is best off with his friends being there to help him. Fletch is forced to find a way to continue to managing the nurses as well as spending more time with his family.
| 923 | 20 | "Blind Spot" | Daikin Marsh | Katie Douglas | 15 May 2018 | 3.81 |
Fletch faces a difficult shift when whilst facing a reality check from Serena and Donna about bank nurses, Mikey arrives on the wards with another student who has broken their wrist. Fletch learns that Mikey pushed the fellow student from the bus through peer pressure, and is unimpressed when he learns that Mikey has been getting involved with a bullying gang. Abigail and Fletch kiss after their shift, which leads to them spending the night together. Hanssen returns to work but Roxanna is convinced he is not in good health. She helps Hanssen realise that he needs to attend therapy in order to improve his wellbeing and the safety of his patients. Sacha tries to win Nicky over on his newly planned, yet unfunded, project. Nicky is sceptical that his project is feasible, but is later won round after some wise words from Sacha.
| 924 | 21 | "Belonging" | Daikin Marsh | Katie Douglas | 22 May 2018 | 3.85 |
Nicky and Meena are tasked with treating the same patient, but their friendship is tested as Meena is determined to prove her worth as a doctor. Nicky grows annoyed at Meena's selfish and competitive attitude, though the two soon realise that they are better off working together, that against each other. Greta arrives at the hospital but is soon stressed out when Serena provides her with much unwanted attention and advice about how to look after her baby once it has been born. Serena soon realises she needs to allow Greta and Jason to make informed decisions for themselves, and allows Jason to move in Greta. Frieda is surprised by the return to Roman, who is determined to make things work between them. Frieda is reluctant to leave the hospital behind to be with Roman, but she later accepts she still loves him. Her hopes of a reunion with Roman are quickly dashed though, when he leaves without her, and her text messages will not send through to him.
| 925 | 22 | "Only a Word" | Thomas Hescott | Nick Fisher | 29 May 2018 | 3.47 |
Frieda keeps up her guard following Roman's abrupt departure. When she goes to open her flat door, Roman re-appears without any warning, bringing with him Joy, his new girlfriend. Joy is kept in Frieda's flat and Frieda notices she is bleeding. As Frieda and Roman argue about their past, Joy collapses and falls unconscious. Roman begs Frieda to help her and tells her that her injuries are the result of a gangmaster. Frieda is furious at Roman but helps Joy anyway. Joy is admitted to the hospital and Frieda and Roman talk outside. Frieda kisses Roman and offers to give them another try, but Roman runs away from her again. Dom's hepatitis C diagnosis continues to play on his mind. After his shift he rejects Lofty's attempts to create fun night for them. On his way home he comes across a young lady whose leg is entrapped in barbed wire and he helps her. He ends up at the hospital again, and so meets up with Lofty again. Sacha stays behind after his shift to befriend a cleaner.
| 926 | 23 | "None but the Brave" | Thomas Hescott | Gerard Sampaio | 5 June 2018 | 3.66 |
Jac returns to Holby following her extended leave, but she is not back in a working capacity, as she discusses with Abigail about becoming John's newest patient for his medical trial and having him operate on her gunshot wound. Despite his recent success in Morocco with a patient he successfully treated under his trial, John is sceptical about operating on Jac. Fletch and Abigail's relationship remains a secret, but Fletch is surprised by Jac's return, and when she asks him out for a drink, he agrees. Lofty notices Dom and Sheilagh behaving recklessly on the hospital wards, putting him in a difficult situation when he attempts to talk to the pair about their behaviour, without offending either of them.
| 927 | 24 | "Primum Non Nocere − Part One" | Jennie Darnell | Patrick Homes | 12 June 2018 | 3.92 |
Serena is delighted by the unexpected return of Bernie. Bernie wants Serena to go over to Nairobi with her, now that her trauma ward is ready to open, but Serena tells Bernie that she cannot leave Holby whilst Greta is pregnant and the hospital is still recovering from the shooting in December 2017. Meena is desperate to prove herself to John, so she devises a care plan for John's next patient. However, as she looks through John's deceased patient notes, she makes a realisation: it is John's aftercare plan that is killing his patient. Abigail invites Fletch on a weekend away with her, which makes Fletch wonder if she is taking their relationship a step further.
| 928 | 25 | "Primum Non Nocere − Part Two" | Jennie Darnell | Patrick Homes | 20 June 2018 | N/A (<4.52) (Note: Not reported in the weekly top 30 programmes for BBC One.) |
Jac's operation day has arrived, and it is up to John to decide whether he continues with Jac's surgery as originally planned, or abandon it. With all eyes on John, he decides to operate on Jac. John is initially uncertain as to whether he has managed to help Jac or not, but he is soon relieved to see that Jac is recovering. Greta goes into labour and gives birth. Serena is thrilled by this, but Bernie fears that Serena's priorities could damage their relationship. Despite this, the pair soon have a heart-to-heart, and with their relationship strengthening, Bernie flies back to Nairobi. Fletch and Abigail are forced to confront their feelings for each other.
| 929 | 26 | "Fallen Idol" | Dermot Boyd | Kathrine Smith | 27 June 2018 | 3.68 |
Nicky, hungover and tired, is shocked when she is told she will be having a surprise assessment. When Nicky goes into a store room to get some equipment, Zav follows her. Nicky and Zav begin arguing, which results in a bottle of culture which Sacha has been hiding in the room being dropped and smashing, resulting in the pair being quarantined in the store room. Roxanna is left questioning herself and where her loyalties lie when John is nowhere to be found and she makes a discovery. Dom's relationship commitments to Lofty are tested when he is offered a job opportunity elsewhere, which would mean having to break his promise to Lofty.
| 930 | 27 | "The Anniversary Waltz" | Dermot Boyd | Joe Ainsworth | 4 July 2018 | N/A (<3.51) |
A celebratory party of 70 years of the NHS is placed on hold when a major incident results in an influx of patients to the hospital. Serena is greeted by a patient who she saved the life of many years ago, and when he introduces her to his daughter, who he named in her honour, Serena is determined to give him the best treatment once again with the help of Ric. Sheilagh reflects on the importance of the NHS and everything it has done for her. Jac and Abigail clash over a patient who is requiring a heart transplant, but Jac is convinced that Abigail's concerns are to do with her, not the patient.
| 931 | 28 | "Into the Light" | Jamie Annett | Becky Prestwich and Nick Fisher | 11 July 2018 | 3.92 |
Roxanna and John return to Holby ecstatic following their recent successes in their patient trials. Their delight is quickly cut short when Roxanna receives a phone call informing her their most recent patient trials has died unexpectedly. Roxanna's trust in John is tested following the death, as she begins to fear for Jac's health. Ethan also arrives on the wards, asking Roxanna to consider him as their next trial patient and treat him for his Huntington's disease. Hanssen is surprised by the return of Essie, who is admitted as a patient. Essie is devastated to be diagnosed with ovarian cancer, and when Hanssen suggests they operate on her and begin her treatment immediately, she panics and begs Raf's father, Enzo, to take her back to Scotland. Donna hopes for her family to reach out to her, and when Zav helps Donna, she realises she may have misjudged him.
| 932 | 29 | "The Friend Zone" | Jamie Annett | Katie Douglas | 17 July 2018 | 3.73 |
Nicky is determined to get her friendship with Meena back on track once and for all, but with Meena working on Darwin ward and the both of them desperate to impress Jac, Nicky realises that the competitive element between them is still there, testing her loyalties as a friend. Sacha's cleaner friend, Patricia, is admitted with abdominal pains. With his feelings for Patricia developing, Sacha does all he can to save her. He then asks her out for a drink, but is rejected, as Patricia admits she is seeing someone. Donna prepares to launch a new business venture, and Zav is determined to get involved, prompting him to prove himself to her.
| 933 | 30 | "Two for Joy" | Toby Frow | Ed Sellek | 24 July 2018 | 3.85 |
Jac is fully recovered and back on Darwin ward for her shift, but John is not convinced she should be at work. Jac and John work together to treat a patient, but clash over who has priority operating on the patient. Jac gains priority over John, and John notices Jac will not ease herself back into her job. He commends Jac on her dedication to the job, but when alone, reflects on Jac's difficulty to hold and manipulate objects, and worries of a potential defect in her recovery, as he braces himself for the worst. Dom plans a holiday for Lofty, while Lofty plans a different surprise for Dom. As Carole gets caught up in the middle of the pair's surprises for each other, she inadvertently makes Dom question his relationship. Dom's doubts are quickly forgotten however, when Lofty proposes. Essie connects with a patient who helps her see Holby in a different way.
| 934 | 31 | "Child in Your Shadow" | Toby Frow | Johanne McAndrew and Elliot Hope | 31 July 2018 | 3.83 |
Fletch faces a day from hell when his son Theo is injured and admitted to the hospital, and his estranged father, Steven, unexpectedly walks back into his life. Fletch's already fractured relationship with Steven is tested further when Evie arrives at the hospital as well. Essie encourages Hanssen to try and ask Roxanna out on a date, but when he goes to give Roxanna a badge as a kind gesture, she cries, and later explains that her mother gave her a similar badge when she was younger. Hanssen invites Roxanna out for a drink, but Roxanna rejects him. Meena and Nicky successfully complete their first foundation year, but Ric and Serena feel they need reminding of what they are letting themselves in for.
| 935 | 32 | "Bygones" | Paulette Randall | Jon Barton | 8 August 2018 | 3.42 |
Fletch struggles to accept Steven's presence as he continues to come to terms with his father's return. As Fletch is trying to help a secretive patient get the care they need, he is distracted by Evie, who demands that she sees her grandfather. Fletch is reluctant to allow Evie to see him, but when Evie gets upset and tells Fletch they need another adult figure in their lives, he tells Steven to apply to be a hospital porter, and stick around. He then goes to visit Jac in her office, but finds her unconscious. She is rushed into an intensive care suite. Essie learns she is clear of cancer, and becomes determined to help Julie and Josh. She turns to John for answers.
| 936 | 33 | "Bargaining" | Paulette Randall | Katie Douglas | 14 August 2018 | 3.63 |
Jac remains stable but initially shows no signs of improvement. John and Roxanna clash over her treatment, leading Roxanna to question whether she has made the right decision in working with John. As Jac deteriorates, Roxanna operates on her, and saves her life. Following the operation, Roxanna questions John as to whether they should end their patient trials, but ultimately decides to distance herself from being a part of the trial instead. Steven is successful in his interview for hospital porter. He tries to make Fletch see that he has changed, but with Fletch distracted by Jac's health, he snaps at Steven. At the same time, Fletch loses focus on a vulnerable patient, placing her life in danger.
| 937 | 34 | "All Business" | Tracey Rooney | Nick Fisher | 21 August 2018 | 3.82 |
Essie is placed in a quandary when John refuses to operate on trial patient Josh due to the nature of his condition. She attempts to convince John to try a risky and unapproved procedure he suggests, and he agrees to consider it. Roxanna warns Essie to be careful around John, and she later backtracks on allowing the procedure to go ahead. Josh is disappointed and collapses, forcing John to operate on Josh. The operation is successful. Donna is stressed over her failing beauty business, but with help from Zav, Donna realises her true potential. Meena faces a difficult shift and is moved to another ward by John when he suspects her of spying on his trials.
| 938 | 35 | "Man Down" | Tracey Rooney | Michelle Lipton | 28 August 2018 | 3.65 |
Sacha is devastated when his patient, Connor, dies during an operation. He heads to the roof of the hospital, followed closely by Ric. There, Sacha reflects on the past year that he and the hospital has faced, including Jac's breakdown, Ric's imprisonment and Essie's grief in the aftermath of Raf's death. It transpires that throughout the year, Sacha had been confiding in Connor about how he was feeling. Ric misunderstands how Sacha is feeling, leading to a small confrontation between the pair. A series of flashbacks reveal how Sacha built up a special relationship with Connor. Sacha is wracked with guilt and considers suicide. He is talked down from the roof by a remorseful Ric. Connor's friend, Tyler, who has the same condition as Connor had, asks Sacha to operate on him. Sacha agrees to, but after he has taken time off work.
| 939 | 36 | "Keep Your Friends Close" | Michael Lacey | Isla Gray | 4 September 2018 | 3.76 (Note: 7 day data due to unavailability of 28 day data.) |
Roxanna is surprised to learn that Josh's operation is still going ahead, but with herself being absent from the hospital, she asks Hanssen to make John see sense and not operate on Josh. Hanssen goes to talk to John about his concerns, but is unable to find him, so investigates the case further himself. Despite this, Josh is operated on. As Hanssen discusses work with John following the operation, John lies about his concerns for Roxanna, claiming she has changed and needed time away from the medical trials to find herself again. Following a bad birthday shift, Meena meets Zav at the pub. The pair later agree to begin seeing each other, and share a kiss. Steven offers to take Evie off of Fletch when she is suspended from school.
| 940 | 37 | "All Lies Lead to the Truth" | Michael Lacey | Robert Goldsbrough | 11 September 2018 | 3.37 |
Frieda is back, and is determined to progress in her career. She tells Jac she wants to be a consultant, so Jac allows Frieda to run Darwin ward for the day. Frieda struggles with the management, and confides in Zav that whilst she was in Pakistan, a boy she was treating died, which has affected her emotionally. Roxanna is determined to understand what John is hiding. She uses Meena to help her gain access to his lab, and whilst she is in there, she learns that John is still abusing the use of embryonic stem cells. Roxanna receives a bigger shock when she realises that John was never truthful with his project, and has abused his power. As John realises Roxanna knows everything, he threatens her. A frightened Roxanna pushes John off of her, but as she makes her way through the hospital car park, she is run over by Meena.
| 941 | 38 | "One Man and His God" | Jan Bauer | Andy Bayliss | 18 September 2018 | 3.54 |
Roxanna is rushed to surgery where a clot on her brain is found; Hanssen and John operate on her, before Hanssen walks out of the operating theatre over to where Roxanna was run over. After a conversation with Jac, Hanssen returns to the theatre room and tries to encourage John to let him stay and look after Roxanna, but John tells Hanssen that he is the only one who can save her. John later goes to visit a shaken-up Meena, and lies to her, telling her that Roxanna is not mentally well. He then receives a shock when his first trial patient, Laszlo, appears in his wet lab. It is revealed through a flashback that John stole Roxanna's work and used it to his advantage, allowing him to advance in his career and win awards. Roxanna then deteriorates and John returns to operate on her, but realising that if Roxanna recovers from her injuries she could end his career, he decides not to cut a ligature in her brain, ultimately giving her locked-in syndrome.
| 942 | 39 | "Undoing" | Sean Glynn | Nick Fisher | 25 September 2018 | 3.71 |
John remains wary as Roxanna regains consciousness. Whilst he is operating on a patient, Meena realises that Roxanna is understanding what she is saying, so she informs John. Essie uses a letter and number chart to try and understand what Roxanna is unable to say, but John interrupts and prevents Roxanna from uncovering his wrongdoings. Once John is alone with Roxanna, he injects her drip with a deadly substance, killing her. Sacha returns to work and is insistent on operating on a patient, concerning Ric and Dom. Steven is injured after intercepting Mikey's bully's attempt of harming him, resulting in Steven needing an operation. As Steven begins to recover, Fletch suggests he moves in with him.
| 943 | 40 | "Inscrutable" | Sean Glynn | Tony Higgins | 2 October 2018 | 3.70 |
Hanssen grieves for Roxanna as John uses a façade to cover his tracks. New foundation doctor Leah Faulkner works alongside Serena on a patient initially suspected of suffering psychological problems. Leah orders a psychiatric assessment on the patient without Serena's permission, causing the patient to request she stays away from him. When the patient is later found to have a benign tumour, Leah is thanked for her intuitive thinking. Leah later goes to the pub to have a drink with Serena, where she flirts with her. Sacha successfully operates on Tyler, but his emotions overwhelm him. Jac supports Sacha and allows him to live with her for as long as he needs to.
| 944 | 41 | "The Three Musketeers" | Daikin Marsh | Joe Ainsworth | 9 October 2018 | 3.59 |
Zav's grandfather, Reg, is admitted to the hospital after he claims to have fallen over at the cemetery whilst visiting Noah, Zav's brother, who died years ago. Zav and Donna search for Reg when he disappears from his bed, and find him in the store room, having confused it for the bathroom. Reg admits he has been suffering with memory loss, before going for surgery. Afterwards, tests reveal that Reg has hypothyroidism. Zav break down as he blames himself for his brother's death, but Reg helps him see that his brother's death was not his fault. John, Hanssen and Ric attend Roxanna's funeral. Afterwards, Hanssen and John are called to theatre to operate on a patient. When the patient begins profusely bleeding, John tries to encourage Henrik to let the patient die, but is unsuccessful when Jac and Nicky step in. Serena attempts to keep her distance from Leah as Leah's flirtatious attitude causes Serena to feel uncomfortable around her.
| 945 | 42 | "Stains" | Daikin Marsh | Patrick Homes | 16 October 2018 | 3.95 |
Henrik delves deeper into John's time at Holby as he begins looking through files of patients treated by John. He then asks Essie if she had any reason to suspect John's trial of being unethical, to which Essie admits she did. Essie then finds John attempting to break into Roxanna's personal belongings, and as Essie suggests Roxanna's belongings should be handed to Hanssen since they were meant for him, John excuses her comment, stating he has lost Hanssen's trust as a friend. John then flees the country to Lisbon, leaving a note for Hanssen. Steven collapses and so Jac performs tests on him. When results show problems with Steven's lungs, he admits to Jac that his father died of a condition associated with the lungs and passed it onto him. Jac tells Steven to inform Fletch of his condition, before later telling Steven she does not trust him. Zav meets up with his other brother, Alex, to try and put the past behind them, although their reunion does not quite go to plan.
| 946 | 43 | "Too Good to Be True" | Jamie Annett | Gerard Sampaio | 23 October 2018 | 3.60 |
Dom and Lofty discuss the possibility of having a baby of their own one day, and whilst Dom expresses positivity and excitement at the prospect of them having a baby together, Lofty seems unsure, and questions if Dom has appreciated the reality of the challenges they would face if they had a child. Lofty later tells Dom he could potentially see them having a baby together in the future, but remains uneasy. After Ric and Jason discuss how Jason's finances could go directly to Greta and his daughter if he was to die, Jason decides he wants to marry Greta. He phones Greta whilst at work to ask if she will marry him, and Greta says yes. Steven is admitted to the hospital after falling down a flight of stairs at the train station. Steven tells Fletch that Jac encouraged him to leave Fletch and the kids behind and Fletch is unimpressed. Steven is diagnosed with COPD so Fletch agrees to allow Steven to move in. Fletch tries to talk to Jac about their friendship, but Jac pushes him away.
| 947 | 44 | "The Family You Choose" | Jamie Annett | Johanne McAndrew and Elliot Hope | 30 October 2018 | 3.89 |
Zav snaps at Jason whilst treating a woman who was thrown from a car outside the front of the hospital. Zav later apologises to Jason for his behaviour, and the two begin to bond about how they struggle to befriend people. Jason asks Zav to be his best man, and Zav agrees. Lofty, Meena and Leah get trapped in a lift and begin discussing regrets in their lives. Leah speaks up about her true feelings for Serena, keeping her name anonymous, and Lofty and Meena encourage Leah to talk to Serena about how she feels. Lofty admits he does not want children to Leah, but hides the information from Dom. Tensions between Fletch and Jac cause awkwardness on Darwin. Meena's suspicions over John's claims about Roxanna's mental health prior to her death grow. Dom tells Meena that if John was concerned about Roxanna's mental health then he should have made a referral, before advising her to talk to someone who really knew her about the situation.
| 948 | 45 | "Report to the Mirror – Part One" | David Innes Edwards | Andy Bayliss | 6 November 2018 | 3.86 |
Hanssen questions Essie and Meena over the entirety of John's trial, when he realises that John is also treating a patient in Lisbon. Meena decides to work with Zav to uncover what is going on, and learns that the patient in Lisbon is another one of John's trial guinea pigs. Jac operates on one of John's trial patients, Josh. When Josh awakens from surgery, he begins to get symptoms similar to those that Jac experienced after her operation from John. She operates on Josh and finds that John's trial has caused Josh's spinal cord significant damage. She heads over to see John, and confronts him, asking John how long he has known the mutated stem cells are killing people. Zav's mother is admitted to the hospital, where it transpires that Zav has been prescribing his mother medication for her bipolar disorder unprofessionally. Zav's mother covers for him and lies about where she has gotten the medication in order to save his career. Essie is given the all clear from her three month on cancer check. Hanssen reprises his status acting CEO when Abigail resigns.
| 949 | 46 | "Report to the Mirror – Part Two" | David Innes Edwards | Andy Bayliss | 13 November 2018 | 4.11 |
Meena, Fletch and Sacha all attempt to dissuade Jac from having her operation in fear of what he will do to her. Despite this, Jac is adamant she is having the operation. John and Hanssen operate on Jac, but John is unable to remove all of the stem cells from Jac's spine. As Jac is recovering in the intensive care unit, Sacha realises John has botched Jac's drip in another attempt to kill her. Serena, Ric and Sacha flush Jac's body of the botched drip, hoping to save her life. John is exposed for his evil actions as the hospital staff realise what he has done. John drugs Essie and flees the hospital to a lake. Hanssen finds John at the lake, where John reveals that he killed Roxanna. Hanssen begins hallucinating after getting some neurotoxin of John's trial onto his hands and soon falls unconscious. When he regains consciousness, John has disappeared into the lake.
| 950 | 47 | "One of Us" | Samantha Harrie | Katie Douglas | 20 November 2018 | 4.38 |
Jac is in a critical condition and requires immediate surgery to attempt to save her life. Sacha ends up calling Guy Self to the hospital to operate on Jac. In the wet lab, Meena and Hanssen rifle through John's notes to find a possible counteraction for the neurotoxin - they find a substance capable of reversing the effects of the implant in Jac and Guy pours it onto the implant in Jac, saving her life. At the same time, Mo returns to Holby to stand in as acting clinical lead in Jac's absence. Police confirm a body has been found in a lake: the body is John's. Hanssen also learns that John murdered Roxanna. On AAU, Zav worries when he learns his mother has run away from St. James's hospital. He snaps at Jason and Donna, but later reconciles with the pair. Zav and Donna share a kiss after their shift.
| 951 | 48 | "Hold My Hand" | Samantha Harrie | Robert Goldsbrough | 27 November 2018 | 4.16 |
Meena questions what she wants out of her career as the aftermath of the havoc John wreaked in his time at the hospital continues to be felt by everyone. Meena ends up resigning and uses her remaining holiday to get away from the hospital immediately. On Darwin, Nicky discusses her future with Mo, stating she would like to remain on Darwin ward permanently. Jac puts Nicky down by telling Nicky that she does not have the potential to thrive on the ward, but Mo encourages Nicky to prove her worth, spurring Nicky on to prove herself to Jac. Leah apologises to Serena after making a series of mistakes during her shift, which results in Leah and Serena kissing. Serena is horrified by Leah's pass at her, and emails Bernie, telling her that they need to talk.
| 952 | 49 | "Love Is" | Tracey Larcombe | Michelle Lipton | 4 December 2018 | 3.74 |
Serena is overwhelmed by guilt following her kiss with Leah. Bernie makes a surprise return to Holby to surprise Serena and Jason. Serena breaks down as she keeps her infidelity a secret from Bernie. Fletch notices something is wrong with Serena and Serena tells Fletch about her kiss with Leah. Fletch tells Serena to tell Bernie about the kiss so they can sort things out, but before Serena is able to tell Bernie the truth, Bernie tells Serena that she has resigned from her job in Nairobi so that her and Serena can make a real go of their relationship. Lofty goes missing during his and Dom's stag night. Dom worries about Lofty until he returns the next day. Dom and Lofty talk about whether they are getting married too quickly, and the pair agree to give each other some space until they can decide what they both want out of their relationship.
| 953 | 50 | "The Right Sort of Animal" | Tracey Larcombe | Ed Sellek | 11 December 2018 | 3.75 |
Serena continues to struggle to keep the truth from Bernie. On the day of Greta and Jason's wedding, a glass pane in the church collapses, injuring many of the guests, including Lexy the vicar. As Bernie recruits Leah to help her in treating the patients, Lexy and Serena talk about Serena's relationship to Bernie. Serena goes ahead and confesses to Bernie about her kiss with Leah. Bernie is saddened by Serena's confession, but initially tells Serena they can still fix things between them. Lofty and Dom continue to struggle to get their relationship back on track, but after a conversation with Greta, Dom becomes evermore determined to make things right. The pair then agree to marry each other, and get married alongside Greta and Jason. After the weddings, Serena and Bernie discuss their relationship again. The pair realise that they cannot take each other away from their careers and lives, and agree to end their relationship all together. Mo puts Nicky up for a junior lead position, which requires Nicky to complete a video interview. Nicky attends the interview but is convinced she has messed up; she is later surprised when Mo informs her that she was successful and will proceed to the next stage in the selection process.
| 954 | 51 | "Family Ties" | Nigel Douglas | Jane Pearson | 18 December 2018 | 3.99 |
Nicky has had a one night stand with an old school friend, Dan. He later turns up at the hospital having been in a fight. When a man is found beaten up in the toilet, Nicky suspects Dan was responsible and finds a photo on his phone proving it. She reports him to the police and, after some hesitation, gives a presentation as part of her application. Sheilagh turns up with bowel pains and Sacha, Henrik and Essie have to operate. Since she will be in hospital over Christmas, Dominic and Lofty decide to stay with her instead of going on honeymoon. Sacha's daughter Beka turns up, wanting to stay with him after an argument with her mother. He is reluctant to let her know about his depression and that he's living with Jac but is eventually honest with her. Henrik suggests he start a dedicated small bowel transplant centre while Ric tries to convince Henrik to take over as CEO again. It's Leah's last day and she convinces Serena to stay in Holby over Christmas and spend it with Jason, despite the painful memories of Elinor.
| 955 | 52 | "Best Christmas Ever" | Nigel Douglas | Patrick Homes | 27 December 2018 | 3.91 |
The hospital's Santa collapses in the car park. He has renal cancer and a bowel infection, with Henrik, Sacha, Mo and Essie having to work together to save him. Henrik agrees to be CEO again. Xavier tries to spend Christmas with Donna and accidentally reveals their relationship to Mia, who agrees to give him a chance. Jac secretly stands in as Santa and agrees to Nicky staying on Darwin, while Mo leaves with Derwood. Jaiyden turns up and announces he is Steven's stepson. It becomes clear Jaiyden's mother Karen, who has had an accident at a Christmas affair, kicked him out thinking he was having an affair when he was actually meeting Evie. Fletch recalls Steven abandoning him one Christmas and Steven reveals his father died that day and he went out and got drunk. With all the secrets out in the open, Fletch, Steven, Evie, Karen and Jaiyden spend Christmas together.

== Production ==
The series began airing on Tuesday nights on BBC One from 2 January 2018. Simon Harper continues his role as the executive producer of the show, while Kate Hall serves as the series producer. The series consists of 52 episodes, a decrease since the previous series.

== Reception ==
Holby City was nominated in the "Best Soap (Evening)" category at the 2018 Digital Spy Reader Awards; it came in last place with 3.8% of the total votes. A prominent storyline of the series, dubbed John Gaskell's (Paul McGann) "reign of terror", was nominated in the Best Soap Storyline category; it came in eleventh place with 3.4% of the total votes. In episode 39, John kills colleague Roxanna MacMillan (Hermione Gulliford). This twist was nominated for Biggest OMG Soap moment and Most devastating Soap Death; in the former, it came in eighth place with 4.8% of the total votes, while in the latter, it came in last place with 3.2% of the total votes. At the 2019 Broadcast Awards, Holby City was shortlisted for the "Best soap or continuing drama" award, losing out to soap opera Coronation Street. Judges on the award panel spotlighted episode 35, "Man Down", which focuses on Sacha's mental health. They praised the episode's "innovative camera techniques and character development".

== Cast ==
=== Overview ===
The twentieth series of Holby City begins with 15 roles receiving star billing, including Guy Henry as chief executive officer and consultant general surgeon Henrik Hanssen, Paul McGann as director of surgical innovations and medicine and consultant neurosurgeon John Gaskell, Bob Barrett as Sacha Levy, a clinical skills tutor, consultant general surgeon and the clinical lead of Keller ward, Hugh Quarshie as consultant general surgeon Ric Griffin, and Rosie Marcel as director of cardiothoracic surgery, consultant cardiothoracic surgeon and clinical lead of Darwin ward Jac Naylor. Hermione Gulliford, meanwhile, portrays consultant neurosurgeon Roxanna MacMillan, James Anderson and Olga Fedori appear as cardiothoracic specialist registrars Oliver Valentine and Frieda Petrenko, David Ames continues his role as Dominic Copeland, a specialist registrar in general surgery. Belinda Owusu and Salma Hoque portray F1 doctors, later F2 doctors, Nicky McKendrick and Meena Chowdhury, and Alex Walkinshaw stars as director of nursing services Adrian "Fletch" Fletcher. Jaye Jacobs appears as staff nurse, and later senior staff nurse, Donna Jackson and Kaye Wragg and Lee Mead feature as staff nurses Essie Di Lucca and Ben "Lofty" Chiltern respectively. Additionally, Jules Robertson continues his semi-regular role as porter Jason Haynes.

Anderson departs his role as Oliver Valentine in episode 13. He confirmed his departure on Twitter after the episode's broadcast, commenting, "It's with a full, heavy heart that I now move on to adventures new." Essie also leaves the series in episode 13. Sasha Morris of Daily Star reported that Wragg had left the cast, but Wragg confirmed on Twitter that it was a break, and Essie returns in episode 28. Marcel confirmed in an interview with Laura-Jayne Tyler of Inside Soap that a main character would be killed off during the series. In episode 39, Roxanna is killed off; the exit was embargoed until transmission to surprise the audience. Producers informed Gulliford when she joined the series that she would be killed off as part of her storyline. John is also killed off in episode 46 when he drowns himself in a lake after a confrontation with Hanssen. Two episodes later, Meena makes her departure after Hoque left the series.

Camilla Arfwedson reprises her role as Zosia March for the opening episode. After taking a break from the serial in the previous series, Catherine Russell returns to her role as consultant general surgeon and clinical lead of the AAU Serena Campbell in episode 6. Marcus Griffiths joins the cast as registrar Xavier "Zav" Duval in episode 8. Jemma Redgrave also left her role as Bernie Wolfe during the previous series, although producer Hall confirmed that she would return when she decided to end her break. Russell confirmed on 6 February 2018 that Redgrave would film several episodes in March, and Bernie returns in episode 24 for two episodes. Redgrave reprises her role again for episodes 49 and 50. Olivia Poulet joins the semi-regular cast as chief executive officer and consultant cardiothoracic surgeon Abigail Tate in episode 14. Abigail makes an off-screen exit in episode 45. Debbie Chazen reprises her guest role as Fleur Fanshawe, now a consultant obstetrician, in episode 25. Chazen last appeared in series 17. In August 2018, it was announced that Chizzy Akudolu would return to the series for two months as consultant cardiothoracic surgeon Mo Effanga, having last appeared in 2017. The following month, it was announced that John Michie would also reprise his role as consultant neurosurgeon Guy Self, over a year since his last appearance. Both characters return in episode 47, the only episode that Guy appears in. Ben Hull also returns to his role as Derwood Thompson in episode 52 for a single episode to aid the end of Mo's guest stint.

The series features several recurring characters, and numerous guest stars. Gruffudd Glyn stars in the two opening episodes as prisoner Danny Fincher. Dana Smit reprises her guest role as Sara Johannsen, the wife of Fredrik Johansson (Billy Postlethwaite), in episode 4. Wanda Ventham stars as Shelaigh Chiltern, the grandmother of Lofty, from episode four. She continued appearing until episode 27, before returning in episode 51. Episode six and seven see the introduction of Greta Allinson (Zoe Croft), a love interest for Jason. Croft later joined the semi-regular cast from episode 21. Macey Chipping appears in five episodes across the series as Fletch's daughter, Evie Fletcher, having last appeared in March 2017. Kai O'Loughlin returns to his role as Mikey Fletcher, Fletch's son, in the series. He appears in episodes 18, 20 and 39. Stanley Rabbetts also appears as Fletch's second son, Theo Fletcher, in episode 31. Darcey Burke appears as Jac's daughter, Emma Naylor-Maconie, in episodes 44 and 47. Poppy Jharka reprises her guest role as Amira Zafar in episodes 11 and 12. Marko Leht was cast as Roman Makarenko, the former boyfriend of Frieda. He appears across three episodes: episode 17, 21 and 22. On 1 February 2018, it was announced that actress Gemma Oaten would reprise her role as nurse Sydney Somers for one episode, having previously appeared in two episodes in the previous series. Sydney stars in episode 20. Oaten later reprises her role again and Sydney appears in episode 50. Julia Deakin returns to the show as Dom's mother, Carole Copeland, in episode 30 for one episode. Donna's child, Mia Barron (Briana Shann), returned to the show for a single appearance in episode 52.

Hall announced that this series would continue to crossover with Casualty. Actress Sara Stewart appears in episode 2 as cardiothoracic surgeon Professor Arianne Cornell, following her appearance in episode 1067 of Casualty. A trailer teasing the show's summer storylines revealed that Casualty character Ethan Hardy, portrayed by George Rainsford, would be guest appearing in an episode in the near future. He appears in episode 28 as part of his storyline about Huntington's disease. Amanda Henderson appeared as her Casualty character Robyn Miller in episode 50.

=== Main characters ===
- David Ames as Dominic Copeland
- James Anderson as Oliver Valentine (until episode 13)
- Bob Barrett as Sacha Levy
- Olga Fedori as Frieda Petrenko
- Marcus Griffiths as Xavier "Zav" Duval (from episode 8)
- Hermione Gulliford as Roxanna MacMillan (until episode 40)
- Guy Henry as Henrik Hanssen
- Salma Hoque as Meena Chowdhury (until episode 48)
- Jaye Jacobs as Donna Jackson
- Rosie Marcel as Jac Naylor
- Paul McGann as John Gaskell (until episode 47)
- Lee Mead as Ben "Lofty" Chiltern
- Belinda Owusu as Nicky McKendrick
- Hugh Quarshie as Ric Griffin
- Catherine Russell as Serena Campbell
- Alex Walkinshaw as Adrian "Fletch" Fletcher
- Kaye Wragg as Essie Di Lucca

=== Recurring characters ===
- Chizzy Akudolu as Mo Effanga
- Jesse Birdsall as Steven Fletcher
- Macey Chipping as Evie Fletcher
- Sasha Clarke as Hannah Best
- Zoe Croft as Greta Allinson
- Hannah Daniel as Leah Faulkner
- Olivia Poulet as Abigail Tate
- Jules Robertson as Jason Haynes
- Wanda Ventham as Sheilagh Chiltern

=== Guest characters ===
- Camilla Arfwedson as Zosia March
- Darcey Burke as Emma Naylor-Maconie
- Debbie Chazen as Fleur Fanshawe
- Julia Deakin as Carole Copeland
- Gruffudd Glyn as Danny Fincher
- Amanda Henderson as Robyn Miller
- Ben Hull as Derwood Thompson
- Poppy Jhakra as Amira Zafar
- Marko Leht as Roman Makarenko
- John Michie as Guy Self
- Kai O'Loughlin as Mikey Fletcher
- Gemma Oaten as Sydney Somers
- Stanley Rabbetts as Theo Fletcher
- George Rainsford as Ethan Hardy
- Jemma Redgrave as Bernie Wolfe
- Briana Shann as Mia Barron
- Dana Smit as Sara Johanssen
- Sara Stewart as Arianne Cornell
