= Squiggle =

Squiggle may refer to:

- Another name for the ASCII character tilde (~)
- Diacritical mark
- Mr. Squiggle, Australian children's TV puppet and show of the same name
- "Squiggle", nickname of the character Libby Fox in British TV soap EastEnders
