= Xavier Duval =

- Holby City character
- Marcus Griffiths as Xavier Duval
- First appearance: "Hard Day's Night"; 20 February 2018
- Last appearance: Episode 1022; 14 April 2020
- Portrayed by: Marcus Griffiths
- Spinoff(s): Casualty (2018, 2019)

In-universe information
- Alias: Zav Duval
- Occupation: Specialist trainee doctor
- Family: Nanette Duval (mother); Marlon Duval (father); Alex Duval (brother); Noah Duval (brother); Reg Thompson (grandfather)
- Significant other: Meena Chowdhury; Donna Jackson

Xavier "Zav" Duval is a fictional character from the BBC medical drama Holby City, played by actor Marcus Griffiths. He first appeared in the series twenty episode "Hard Day's Night", broadcast on 20 February 2018. Xavier arrives at Holby City hospital to work as a doctor and surgeon on the Acute assessment unit (AAU). Xavier is characterised as a "very confident and charming" doctor who sometimes lacks empathy. He is the show's "alpha male" and upon his arrival, this attitude irritates other characters. Xavier has a "flash" sense of style and Griffiths likened him to a "Milan catwalk model" rather than a doctor.

Xavier wants fun and dislikes the idea of settling down. In line with his characterisation, Xavier formed a casual relationship with F1 Meena Chowdhury (Salma Hoque). He was later paired with senior staff nurse Donna Jackson (Jaye Jacobs), which developed into a serious relationship. Griffiths later remarked that Donna became Xavier's "lighthouse" who helped him resolve his issues and become a better person. Griffiths became worried that Xavier would be forever portrayed as an "entitled brat". He requested that producers create a backstory for Xavier and introduce friends and family. Writers obliged, creating an unlikely friendship with hospital porter Jason Haynes (Jules Robertson) and introduced his entire family, including his mother Nanette Duval (Suzette Llewellyn), who has bipolar disorder.

Griffiths left the series after two years. His final story featured a feud with CT1 Cameron Dunn (Nic Jackman). Xavier sets out to prove Cameron left surgeon Evan Crowhurst (Jack Ryder) to die in his care. Cameron ruins Xavier's career and he is killed after being hit by a bicycle and sustaining a fatal head injury. Xavier's final appearance occurred in the fourteenth episode of series 22, which was broadcast on 14 April 2020. The character was well received by critics of the genre, due to his charming persona and appearance. His departure and death were branded "shocking" and "biggest twist" of the series by various journalists.

== Casting ==
When Griffiths successfully auditioned for the role of Xavier he had little experience working on television, having previously opted for theatre work. He described joining a long-running series as "new terrain" and stated that he was "loving" his new role. The character first appeared in the series twenty episode "Hard Day's Night", broadcast on 20 February 2018.

In April 2018, Griffiths starred in one episode of Holby City's sister show, Casualty, as Xavier. Griffiths made another appearance in the show as part of a two-part crossover episode, originally broadcast in March 2019.

== Development ==
=== Characterisation ===
Xavier is not a metrosexual man, he loves nothing more than a bit of mansplaining and manspreading. He doesn’t see himself as sexist - he likes a competent woman as much as the next guy! He’s attractive and charming, but his attitudes usually mean that his relationships never last long, but that’s fine by him as he’s not really looking for anything serious at this point in his life.

— An excerpt from Xavier's profile on the official Holby City website.

Xavier is characterised as an "attractive and charming" doctor who has a "rakish devil-may-care attitude". This attitude makes Xavier struggle to make friends, but once they see his "charm and exuberance" they become more inclined to get acquainted. He is also described as having a penchant for "mansplaining and manspreading" but he would not label himself as a sexist. He likes "competent woman" but his charming attitude usually come with short-term relationships. When he arrives at the hospital Xavier wants to have fun because he is not ready to settle down with someone.

Griffiths told Laura-Jayne Tyler from Inside Soap that upon his introduction, Xavier is portrayed as a "very confident and charming". He displays the typical qualities of an "alpha male" which he believed "rubs people up the wrong way." Writers demonstrated this in his early scenes as Xavier's attitude causes tension with consultant Serena Campbell (Catherine Russell) and senior staff nurse Donna Jackson (Jaye Jacobs). Despite his overconfident persona, Griffiths did admire his work ethic. Xavier is "very ambitious and driven" but can lack empathy when patients need it most. He branded him a "marmite character who viewers are either going to love or hate." Xavier's behaviour developed because of his childhood. Griffiths said that writers planned to explore his past but they liked to portray Xavier being secretive about his personal and family life. As Xavier is a skilled surgeon, Griffiths needed to gain experience on acting out operations to make the character appear authentic. The show's production supplied him with a life-size model of a guest character for him to practise operating on. Griffiths stated that he "felt a sense of big responsibility" even though it was a fake operation. Xavier is portrayed in stylish attire when not wearing hospital scrubs. Griffiths liked his character's "great clothes" and labelled him a "bit of a flash". He quipped that Xavier was more like a "Milan catwalk model" than a doctor.

=== Family and relationships ===
Xavier's reputation for not making friends is demonstrated early on in his tenure. When he meets F1 Nicky McKendrick (Belinda Owusu) in a bar, they get drunk together and she sleeps in the hospital on-call room. The following day Nicky cannot remember the events of the previous evening and asks Xavier for help. Griffiths explained that Xavier "enjoys winding people up" and refuses to help Nicky, teasing her about her behaviour. Griffiths believed that this episode "sets the tone of their relationship". Writers soon paired Xavier with Nicky's best friend, F1 Meena Chowdhury (Salma Hoque). Writers kept their relationship confined to Xavier's non-commitment rules. Griffiths told Tyler (Inside Soap) that Xavier and Meena's relationship is a "friends with benefits" arrangement. Meena is naturally "a lot more invested" in their relationship because he is a "ladies' man and a charmer." Meena becomes jealous of Xavier's friendship with Nicky. He gives Nicky money to pay off her debts and they grow closer. When the pair are trapped in a room together, they confide in each other and Xavier tells Nicky about his brother's death. Xavier soon ends his relationship with Meena, who then accuses Nicky of having sex with her boyfriend.

Griffiths was worried that Xavier would be forever portrayed as "an entitled brat." He met with producers and requested further development of his family. Writers obliged and began to explore Xavier's backstory and family. Xavier details on-screen how he had a younger brother, Noah, who had died. It was revealed that Noah had been sent to his room for misbehaviour during Xavier's birthday party. With Xavier receiving the attention, Noah ran off and was fatally knocked down by a car. This lead Xavier to blame himself for his brother's death. Then Xavier's grandfather, Reg Thompson (Jeffery Kissoon) was admitted to AAU requiring surgery, accompanied by Xavier's brother Alex Duval (Leemore Marrett Jr.). Xavier accuses Alex of abusing their grandfather but soon realises he is mistaken. Alex refuses to accept his brother's apology and orders him to resolve his issues of Noah's death.

In later episodes, Xavier's mother Nanette Duval (Suzette Llewellyn) is introduced. Nanette has bipolar disorder and arrives at the hospital in a confused state. Doctors manage to find that Nanette has been overdosing on lithium. Xavier fears he may lose his job after secretly supplying his mother with the lithium. He was given a reprieve when consultant Sacha Levy (Bob Barrett) decides not to report Xavier. Xavier's father Marlon Duval (Ricky Fearon) was soon introduced into the story. Griffiths believed it was "amazing" to explore the family element of Xavier's story. He also praised Lewellyn as an "amazing" addition to Holby City. In another episode, Nanette arrives at the hospital in a confused state. Xavier is busy in an operating theatre helping consultant Ric Griffin (Hugh Quarshie). Donna fears that she has harmed someone upon discovering a blood-stained train ticket in her belongings. Marlon is then brought into AAU suffering a stab wound and requires surgery. Donna is forced to remove Xavier from the operation and he fears his father may die. Griffiths was happy that all of Xavier's family featured in the show. He told Stephen Patterson from Metro that "it just filled the inner life of this person that I was stepping into, and that’s kind of the bread and butter, and once you get that."

An unlikely friendship was scripted between Xavier and hospital porter Jason Haynes (Jules Robertson). The duo bond over a patient's care. The story begins when they witness Sian Evans (Ajjaz Awad) thrown from a vehicle in the hospital car park. Xavier and Jason go to help and discover a stab wound to her torso. Jason stems the bleeding by applying pressure with his jumper. Xavier thanks Jason for helping to save Sian, but becomes annoyed with him when he becomes fixated on helping with the rest of the case. Xavier loses his patience and angrily informs Jason that he is just a porter. Xavier discovers that Sian has a baby; she remains unconscious and the hospital are unable to locate the child. Jason makes amends and tracks down the car and successfully locates Sian's baby. Griffiths observed a good team dynamic of doctor and porter working together and said writers had planned more stories together. He believed he and Robertson worked well together, calling the experience it "amazing" and a "privilege".

Soon after Xavier and Meena's break-up, producers created a new romance between Xavier and nurse Donna. Amy Johnson from the Daily Express reported that the two would become close following the advice of a patient. Donna soon realises that she has developed romantic feelings for Xavier. Writers soon developed their connection into a serious relationship. Griffiths approved of the relationship and believed that the relationship would "evolve" Xavier "in a completely different way." The actor branded Donna a "lighthouse" in Xavier's story who helps him resolve the issues of his past. He added that "she was the vessel that carried him through all that and really taught him how to love and be himself and not be guarded."

Nanette's arrival also causes problems for their romance. Nanette takes a disliking to Donna and disapproves of her treating an injury on AAU. Nanette warned Donna that she would return to the ward and get Xavier's attention. She is readmitted with a more severe injury, which causes an argument with Xavier. The camera angles used in the scenes panned to an "evil" facial expression aimed at Donna. After their break-up, Griffiths assessed that Xavier's relationship with Donna changed his character's selfish personality. He told Patterson that Donna "softened him, she made him realise who he really is, and removed all the ego and the arrogance and really got to the grit of who he is."

=== Feud with Cameron Dunn and death ===
"Xavier’s demise came about because the [Cameron] storyline needed a boost and I was happy to take on the mantle. I thought: ‘If you’re gonna go out, go out with a bang.’ But I do realise it’ll be a huge shock to the system for Holby fans."

—Marcus Griffiths discussing the Xavier's departure story. (2020)

Producers created a feud between Xavier and CT1 Cameron Dunn (Nic Jackman). He suspects that Cameron is a liar and allowed Jason to illegally perform a medical procedure in a broken lift. Cameron took the credit for saving the patient and covered for Jason. Jackman explained that Cameron "makes the wrong decisions" and Xavier sets out to expose his lies. Jason soon confirms to Xavier that he performed the procedure. Cameron had previously let abusive surgeon Evan Crowhurst (Jack Ryder) die in intensive care. When an investigation is launched into Evan's death, Xavier notices that Cameron becomes nervous. He begins to suspect that Cameron was involved and vows to expose the truth. Cameron realises that Xavier is suspicious and begins plotting against him. He makes Xavier believe that he has poisoned his coffee. Xavier confronts Cameron and he makes comments about his mental health, insinuating that he is bi-polar like his mother. Cameron's mind games lead to a violent confrontation. Xavier is subsequently suspended for attacking Cameron in the work place.

After his suspension, Xavier remains fixated on ruining Cameron's career. He is called into work to face a disciplinary hearing but decides to concentrate on Cameron. Griffiths told Victoria Wilson from What's on TV that "Zav goes all out to bring Cameron down" and likened the plot to a "spy thriller" film. Griffiths added that his character actively pursues Cameron because "feels he's got nothing to lose", after losing his career and girlfriend. Xavier finds evidence off security footage that proves Cameron let Evan die. He confronts Cameron in the hospital basement and warns him that he will inform the police. Griffiths added that Cameron "reaches a whole new level of deception, through calculated plans and sheer luck, he manages to orchestrate Zav's downfall." On his way to the police station, Cameron chases after Xavier and he is hit by a cyclist. The impact knocks Xavier over and he hits his head on the kerb. Xavier later dies from his injuries and Cameron gets away with his crimes. The story formed Griffiths' departure from Holby City and he confirmed that these were his final scenes as Xavier.

Xavier's departure from the show was not publicised in advance spoilers. Griffiths had to keep Xavier's departure a secret to shock viewers, which he found difficult. He told Sophie Dainty from Digital Spy that he was happy with his exit story because it was memorable. He added "I am all about arc; about where people start and where people finish [...] he ended up dying trying to do the right thing." Producers informed Griffiths that his character would be killed off in Cameron's story. Griffiths told Patterson (Metro) that he understood why they wanted it to be Xavier. When the character was introduced he was "so self-involved" and only interested in climbing "the corporate ladder". Griffiths thought this was "Shakespearean tragedy" because Xavier died as he was finally doing something to help others, rather than himself. He likened Xavier to a "sacrificial lamb" because had he remained, Cameron's story would have concluded.

The actor believed Xavier's exit story highlighted the fragility of life. He was killed by a bicycle and a "simple knock to the head on the kerb"; Griffiths thought it was important to recognise "something very arbitrary" like Xavier's accident can kill. Following his death, Xavier's organs are donated to other patients. His colleagues also perform a heart transplant using Xavier's heart. His final scene depicted the character lay dead on a mortuary slab. Griffiths found the scene upsetting to film. He revealed that he did "tear up" because "it was an accumulation of a lot of hours and pressure at times." Xavier's death also formed a conclusion to the story with Donna. Jacobs was "sad" about Griffiths' departure and called his death a "big shock". She also felt sorry for her character having to grieve his death. Griffiths was unhappy with the ending Xavier and Donna received. He described it as a "big bugbear" that Xavier did not reconcile with her prior to death. In their last shared scene, Griffiths wanted to make their interaction more emotional. But the episode's director did not like the idea because Xavier was unaware of impending death and more concerned about exposing Cameron's lies.

== Reception ==
For his portrayal of Xavier, Griffiths was nominated for "Best Soap Newcomer" at the 2018 Digital Spy Reader Awards. He came in ninth place, receiving 3 per cent of the total votes. Inside Soap's Tyler branded Xavier a "hot new medic" and "handsome registrar" who made Holby City worth watching. Griffiths' colleague Hugh Quarshie believed Xavier was the "most fancied character" on the show. He also revealed that Griffiths had received nude fan mail. A Radio Times writer believed that Xavier had "slippery charm". Victoria Wilson (What's on TV) called him a "smooth registrar". The Metro's Patterson opined that Xavier was "the subject of some pretty incredible character development over the years."

Readers of entertainment website Digital Spy were not impressed with the decision narrative-wise to kill off Xavier. More than 3600 readers took part in the poll with 91 per cent voting that it was the incorrect decision. Sophie Dainty from the website branded Xavier's departure Holby City's "biggest twist of the year" and a "shocking story". A reporter from Heart radio agreed it was the show's "biggest twist" and said viewers were "shocked". Charlie Milward from the Daily Express described his departure as some "heartbreaking scenes". Sasha Morris from the Daily Star branded the bikerider not reporting Cameron running from the crash scene a "plot hole". She added that fans were "horrified" and "devastated". Morris thought that Xavier's "turned upside down" by Nanette's arrival, adding that her story with Marlon "shocked" viewers. Sue Haasler from Metro stated that his death was a "huge shock".
