= Man Down =

Man Down may refer to:

- Man Down (film), a 2015 film starring Shia LaBeouf
- "Man Down" (song), a 2011 single by Rihanna
- "Man Down" (Shakka song) (2018)
- Man Down (TV series), a British sitcom starring Greg Davies
- "Man Down" (CSI: Miami episode)
- "Man Down" (Holby City), an episode of Holby City
- Man Down (album), a 2024 album by Ice Cube
