= Jules Robertson =

British actor (born 1991)

- Born: Julius Robertson; 1991 (age 33–34); London, England
- Occupation: Actor
- Years active: 2014–present
- Parents: Geoffrey Robertson (father); Kathy Lette (mother)

Julius Robertson (born 1991) is a British actor, best known for his role as Jason Haynes in the BBC medical drama Holby City. Both Robertson and the character of Jason are autistic.

== Career ==
When he was eighteen, Robertson decided to become an actor. He enrolled at Regent's University, London, becoming their first known autistic pupil. He subsequently won a college award for excellence. He later joined Access All Areas, which solely represents neurodivergent actors.

=== Holby City ===
In 2015, Robertson was cast in the semi-regular role of Jason Haynes in Holby City, becoming one of the first autistic actors to actually play a neurodivergent role in a major BBC drama. He continued to play the part up until the show's last episode in 2022. His performance received acclaim from critics and neurodivergent organisations.

Robertson expressed hopes that his character would inspire further representation for those on the spectrum: “I hope that I'm seen as a role model. I hope that I'm encouraging people with other conditions or people who are on the spectrum and have autism or mild learning difficulties. If they watch me on Holby City I hope I'm showing them that it can happen for them and they shouldn't lose faith and hope.”

=== Later work ===
Robertson has made guest appearances in Endeavour and Midsomer Murders. He has expressed interest in playing a James Bond villain, and hopes to become the first neurodivergent actor to portray Hamlet.

== Personal life ==
Robertson was born in London. Robertson's Australian-born parents are barrister Geoffrey Robertson and author Kathy Lette. He has a younger sister, Georgina.

== Filmography ==
Year	Title	Role	Notes
1999	Mad Cows	Boy in mothercare	Credited as Julius Robertson
2016–2022	Holby City	Jason Haynes	49 episodes
2017	Air	Danny	Short film
2021	Endeavour	Debating Society President	Episode: “Colours”
2021	Love	Oscar	Short film
2022	Midsomer Murders	Charlie Cabot	Episode: “The Debt of Lies”
