= Kathy Lette =

Australian-British author (born 1958)

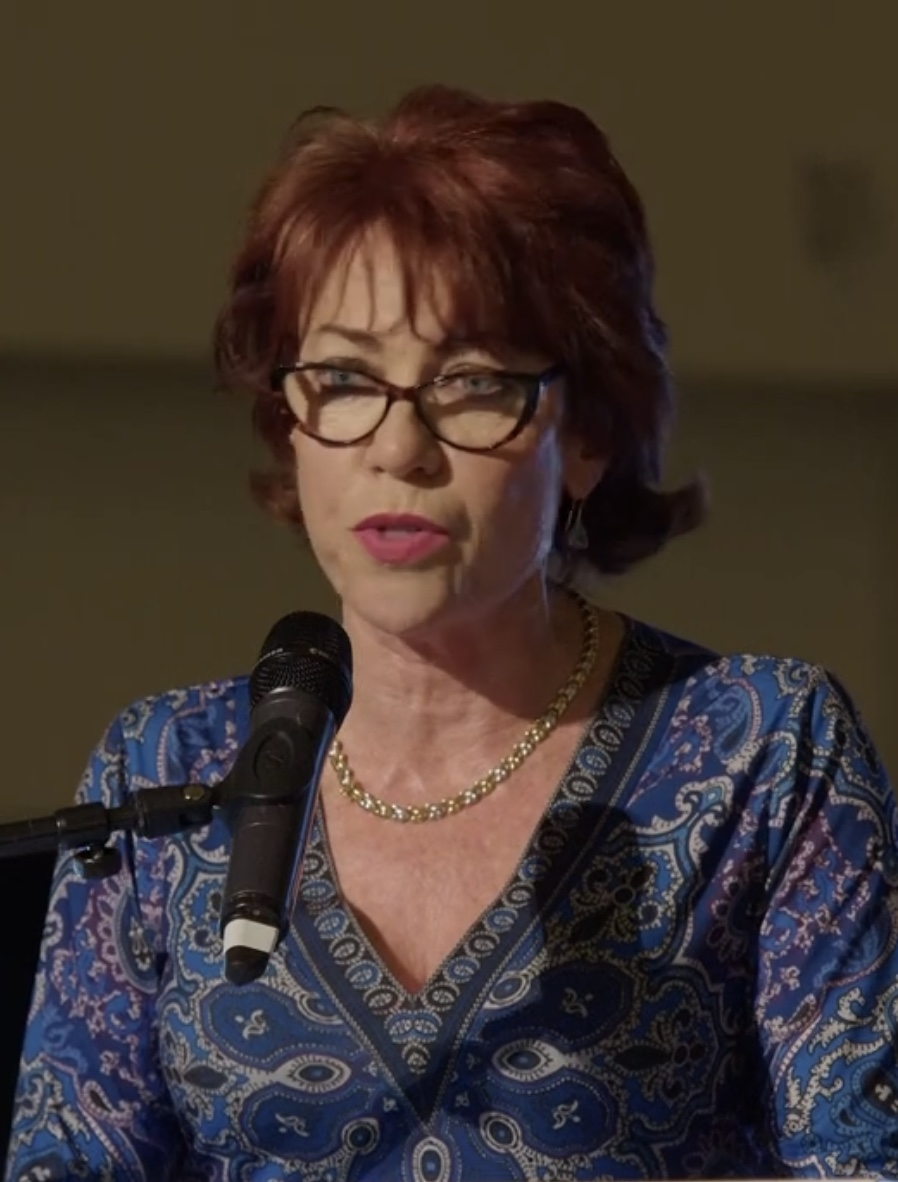
- Lette at the British Library in 2022
- Born: November 1958 (age 67–68); Sydney, New South Wales, Australia
- Citizenship: Australian; British
- Occupation: Author
- Years active: 1979–present
- Spouses: Kim Williams (m. 1983; div. 1989) Geoffrey Robertson (m. 1990; sep. 2017)
- Children: 2 (including Jules Robertson)
- Website: www.kathylette.com

Kathryn Marie Lette (born 11 November 1958) is an Australian and British author. She came to prominence with her 1979 novel Puberty Blues.

== Early life and education ==
Kathryn Marie Lette was born in November 1958 in Sydney.

She appeared in The Sydney Morning Herald of 20 August 1978 pictured in Martin Place with her friend Gabrielle Carey in an article titled "Buskers Lose Freak Tag". They were standing up for buskers' rights not to be moved on as Sydney City Council enforced a 1919 Act of Parliament in New South Wales.

== Career ==
Lette first attracted attention in 1979 as the co-author (with Gabrielle Carey) of Puberty Blues, a strongly autobiographical, teen novel about two 13-year-old southern suburbs girls attempting to improve their social status by ingratiating themselves with the "Greenhills gang" of surfers. The book was made into a film in 1981 and a TV series in 2012.

She subsequently became a newspaper columnist and sitcom writer, but returned to the novel form with Girls' Night Out in 1988 and has since written several more novels and plays, including Foetal Attraction in 1993, Mad Cows in 1996 (which was made into a film starring Joanna Lumley and Anna Friel) and Dead Sexy.

She left Australia for the United Kingdom in 1988 and took British citizenship in 2011.

In 2007, she published the book How to Kill your Husband (and other handy household hints) which was turned into an opera in 2011 by composer Alan John and playwright Timothy Daly; it was premiered at the Victorian Opera, conducted by Richard Gill. The same year, she briefly appeared on Sunrise as a London correspondent, a part of the Global Notebook. In 2008, Lette published To Love, Honour and Betray (Till Divorce Us Do Part), a romantic novel with hints of comedy.

With Jessica Adams, Maggie Alderson and Imogen Edwards-Jones, Lette edited an anthology by prominent women writers of erotic short-stories, In Bed with... (2009), including contributions from Louise Doughty, Esther Freud, Ali Smith, Joan Smith, Rachel Johnson and Fay Weldon, each publishing under a pseudonym.

In April 2009, she contributed to the fourth issue of the literary magazine Notes from the Underground with a piece honouring her close friend John Mortimer. In November 2009, she received an honorary doctorate from Southampton Solent University.

She teamed with Radox to write a water-resistant book, which was released free online in September 2009, with an aim to encourage women to be selfish with their time.

== Recognition ==
In recognition of her many novels and advocacy of equality, human rights, and physical and mental health both nationally and internationally, Lette was awarded an Honorary Doctor of Letters (Honoris Causa) from the University of Wollongong on 20 April 2017.

== Personal life ==
Lette lives in South Hampstead in the London Borough of Camden. She has two children, Julius and Georgina, with fellow Australian expatriate Geoffrey Robertson. She met him, while still married to Kim Williams, when she appeared on Robertson's TV panel debate show Hypotheticals. Julius, also known as "Jules", has Asperger syndrome. He has embarked on a career as an actor and plays the character of Jason Haynes in Holby City. Lette and Robertson separated in 2017.

Lette has Australian citizenship and is also a naturalised British citizen.

Lette supports the UK Labour Party. In August 2014, she was one of 200 public figures who were signatories to a letter in The Guardian expressing their hope that Scotland would vote to remain part of the United Kingdom in September's referendum on that issue.

== Books ==
=== Novels ===
- Puberty Blues (1979, with Gabrielle Carey)
- Girls' Night Out (1988)
- The Llama Parlour (1992)
- Foetal Attraction (1993)
- Mad Cows (1996)
- Altar Ego (1998)
- Nip 'n' Tuck (2001)
- Dead Sexy (2003)
- How to Kill your Husband (and other handy household hints) (2006)
- To Love, Honour and Betray (Till Divorce Us Do Part) (2008)
- The Boy Who Fell to Earth (2012)
- Love is Blind (2013)
- Courting Trouble (2014)
- Best Laid Plans (2017)
- HRT: Husband Replacement Therapy (2020)
- Till Death, or a Little Light Maiming, Do Us Part (2022)
- The Revenge Club (2024)

=== Other ===
- In Bed with... (2009, anthology, editor))
- Men: a User's Guide (2010, humour)
- Go to Husband School (2025, article in The Oldie)
