= Nicky McKendrick =

Fictional character from the television series Holby City

- Holby City character
- Belinda Owusu as Nicky McKendrick
- First appearance: "We Need to Talk About Fredrik"; 12 December 2017
- Last appearance: "Episode 1102"; 29 March 2022
- Portrayed by: Belinda Owusu

In-universe information
- Occupation: CT3 doctor; (prev. F1 doctor, F2 doctor, CT1 doctor)
- Family: Tracey McKendrick (mother)
- Significant other: Cameron Dunn; Louis McGerry

Nicky McKendrick is a fictional character from the BBC medical drama Holby City, played by actress Belinda Owusu. She first appeared in the series nineteen episode "We Need to Talk About Fredrik", broadcast on 12 December 2017. Nicky arrives at Holby City hospital to work as a trainee doctor (F1). Fifty five female actresses attended auditions to play Nicky and Meena Chowdhury. The series producer Kate Hall workshopped the characters during August 2017 and in September it was announced that Owusu and Salma Haque had been chosen to play Nicky and Meena.

Nicky is characterised as a conscientious, talented and clever doctor. She is from a struggling working-class background and has to prove herself at Holby City hospital. She progresses from F1 to F2 and decides to specialise in cardiothoracic surgery on the show's fictitious Darwin ward. Her time in the show sees her constantly competing with Meena and later F2 doctor Cameron Dunn (Nic Jackman). She also struggles to impress her clinical lead and Consultant Jac Naylor (Rosie Marcel). Other stories for the character include developing a partying lifestyle and getting into debt. Nicky's debts stories were revisited in 2020, after the show's producers decided to explore the character's backstory. Following Owusu's pregnancy, the character was written out of the series for several months.

== Casting ==
In August 2017, Holby City series producer Kate Hall told Daniel Kilkelly of Digital Spy that she planned to introduce two new female doctors. Fifty-five "emerging young actresses" auditioned for the roles and six were chosen for the second stage of the casting process. She said that they were work shopping the characters and doing screen tests with Alex Walkinshaw and Kaye Wragg who play Adrian "Fletch" Fletcher and Essie Harrison respectively. Hall added that whoever had the best chemistry in the tests would be cast and they would both debut on-screen in the months that followed.

On 29 September 2017, it was announced that Owusu had joined the show playing Nicky, a F1 trainee doctor. She was employed alongside Salma Haque who took the role of Nicky's best friend Meena Chowdhury. It was revealed that the two trainees would discover how working in a challenging role would affect their lifelong friendship. The actress was happy to secure the role of a doctor and enjoyed watching her initial scenes back. Owusu previously played Libby Fox in the soap opera EastEnders, which like Holby City is filmed at the BBC Elstree Centre. The actress compared working on Holby City to going back to school, because she was already familiar with the studios.

== Development ==
=== Introduction ===
Duncan Lindsay from Metro reported that Nicky and Meena would be introduced together. They are best friends and arrive from medical school and realise that working at Holby City hospital is more difficult than they imagined. He added that the pair would be monitored by Consultant cardiothoracic surgeon Jac Naylor (Rosie Marcel), a character known for being "intimidating". Jac questions whether the new employees can cope with their new responsibilities. Nicky first appears in the series nineteen episode "We Need to Talk About Fredrik", broadcast on 12 December 2017. At the time of their introduction the hospital's staff are reeling following a mass shooting committed by staff member Fredrik Johansson (Billy Postlethwaite). They are rotad onto the acute admissions unit (AAU). Owusu explained that "she joins with Meena, so she has her best friend at her side – and as far as the aftermath of recent events go, neither of them know any different."

Nicky is from a struggling working-class background whereas Meena is more privileged. They initially work well together out of fear they will fail their rotation. As they progress they become competitive in a bid to impress the hospital hierarchy. Series producer Kate Hall told Lindsay that the duo are "friends from medical school and Nicky and Meena will have their work cut out as Holby’s fresh F1’s. Thrown into a fiercely rivalrous, fast-paced surgical world, they will need to go all out to impress senior-ranking consultants and as the young doctors fight to survive, their friendship will be sorely tested."

=== Characterisation ===
A publicist from BBC Online describes the character as "conscientious, talented and clever" but she often fails to excel in her career. Nicky feels fine getting her job done to the required standard and "doesn't have a strong desire to be the best." They add that she is not a boring character because she has a liking for partying. Nicky consumes too much alcohol after her shifts finish and she is often hungover on the job. Owusu told Tricia Welch from the Daily Express that she thinks Nicky is "smart and driven".

Owusu told Laura-Jayne Tyler from Inside Soap that Nicky has a "really academic side" and has her "head screwed on". She is worldly and not naive, a young woman with "immense talent, drive and ambition." Owusu felt lucky to play the character as a young female herself. The actress added that she is also "very bold, smart, and passionate about her work – and really throws herself into it."

The actress liked Nicky's style while at work because she is always seen in comfortable baggy scrubs. When she is not in the hospital Nicky is seen in dark T-shirts, black jeans and an array of colourful neck scarves. Her favourite item of Nicky's are her Marks & Spencer burgundy creeper shoes with a high platforms. Owusu said that she would not personally wear Nicky's off-duty attire but found it fun while on the set.

=== Career ===
Nicky faces on challenging case when she is assigned to patient Raymond Heron (Martin Behrman). He cannot eat food without vomiting and Nicky is left to diagnose his condition. Through the case she gains experience working with registrar Xavier Duval (Marcus Griffiths) and they struggle to find out what is wrong. When Raymond reveals that he lost ten stone in two years Nicky makes a diagnosis of SMA Syndrome, which caused the weight loss. When Nicky makes a correct diagnosis on a patient, Consultant neurosurgeon John Gaskell (Paul McGann) invites Nicky to assist him in surgery. Meena convinces Nicky to turn down the offer because they are still new. Meena betrays Nicky and sneaks off to assist Gaskell in the operating theatre instead.

Nicky later decides to put her career before her friendship with Meena. When they are forced to work together on Darwin they compete to impress Jac which causes them to argue. Nicky finally showcases her ambition and betrays Meena by stealing her slot in surgery. Both Nicky and Meena pass their first year on the foundation programme and progress to F2. Consultant general surgeon Ric Griffin (Hugh Quarshie) is not impressed by their new arrogance and decides to give them a group of new F1 doctors to mentor. He also sets them medical tasks to solve but they use modern technology to exceed his expectations.

Nicky decides that she wants to specialise in Cardiothoracic surgery and has to prove herself by diagnosing a difficult case. Nicky has a difficult time working for Jac. Things change on Darwin when consultant Mo Effanga (Chizzy Akudolu) takes over while Jac recovers from surgery. She makes the ward more fun and gives more freedom to the staff. Akudolu assessed that "poor Nicky was terrified while working under Jac, so the pressure is lifted a little bit with Mo in charge." The medic later jeopardises her career when she treats patient Dan Chambers (Elliot Balchin). Dan is an old school friend of Nicky's and the pair have sex the night before he is admitted to Darwin ward. Nicky realises that Dan has nearly beaten another patient to death the evening before. Dan reveals he took intimate photographs of their night together in the hope it scares her from informing the police. Her mentor Mo convinces Nicky to report him and she is left scared by Dan's behaviour.

F2 doctor Cameron Dunn (Nic Jackman) joins Darwin working rotations with Nicky and Jac coins a duo nickname for them: "Foetus and Fauntleroy". The pair compete against each other to win a prize of accompanying Jac to a medical conference in Naples. Nicky is angry when her patient Laurie Stocks (Brian Pettifer) dies because the Darwin team prioritise their colleague Tom Campbell-Gore's (Denis Lawson) surgery. Cameron was first to diagnose Laurie but admits he had help unlike Nicky and this prompts them to work as a team.

=== Partying and debts ===
Nicky develops a reputation for partying and drinking. When she is on a night out with Meena, they meet new registrar Xavier. Meena likes Xavier but Nicky ends up getting drunk with him. Griffiths told Inside Soap's Tyler that Nicky and Xavier share a "very fractious relationship". They go on an "alcohol fuelled journey" which lands Nicky handcuffed to a bed in the staff on-call room. In the morning a hungover Nicky cannot remember anything and questions what happened to her. Griffiths explained that Xavier enjoys winding people up and he refuses to disclose anything from the night before. He added that this sets the tone for their working relationship.

On another occasion Nicky gets drunk and goes to work with an extreme hangover. She then receives a letter informing her about her mounting debts. They threaten to send bailiffs to her home if she does not hand over twelve thousand pounds. Xavier offers to help sort the debt when he notices her upset. In another episode Meena worries that her relationship with Xavier is failing and asks Nicky to speak to him. When Nicky finds Xavier in an office, she knocks over a container housing a virus and the pair are locked inside while decontamination process is completed. During this time Nicky decides to be truthful about her escalating problems. She reveals more debt and tells him that she has developed an alcohol problem.

The show's series producer Jane Wallbank had promised more prominent stories for Nicky in 2020. She told Sophie Dainty from Digital Spy that "we will learn more about Nicky, the huge strains on her, and where that goes in a big, gritty, topical story close to my heart." Nicky's financial woes were soon revisited when 2020 episodes aired. Writers introduced Nicky's mother Tracey McKendrick (Cathy Murphy) into the series for the story. Dainty revealed that Tracey would be Nicky's "troublesome mum" and it would offer the "first insight into the enormous personal straits" on Nicky. Her woes begin when her mother has a car crash and injures Steve Connor (John Wark). He blackmails Tracey and Nicky for money or he will report the crime to the police. He threatens Tracey, which forces Nicky to take on the debt. Writers also played Nicky "out of character" as she calls in sick to earn extra money working overtime in a separate hospital.

Steve carries on blackmailing Nicky for money and Nicky jeopardises her career to earn money. When a patient offers her cash in exchange for surgery, Nicky endangers the patient's life for the bribe. Owusu told Tyler from Inside Soap that Nicky allowed the situation to worsen because "she has a knack of burying her head in the sand." Nicky feels like there is no one to help her through her predicament. She added that "there's such a genuine threat from Steve, that Nicky doesn't really have anywhere to turn." Cameron later discovers the truth and violently threatens Steve to leave Nicky alone. Owusu believed that Nicky wouldn't suspect Cameron did any wrong to Steve because "she's wearing love goggles" where he is concerned.

=== Break ===
In February 2021, Owusu announced that she was pregnant with her first child. Chris Edwards from Digital Spy confirmed that the actress would stop filming on the show, which could result in a departure for Nicky. The character departs in the series 22 finale, originally broadcast on 30 March 2021. Her exit had not been confirmed prior to broadcast. Her exit story follows the aftermath of her boyfriend Cameron Dunn being exposed as a serial killer. Nicky struggles with the revelation as she is pregnant with his child and initially decides to have a termination. She soon changes her mind after support from friend Louis McGerry (Tyler Luke Cunningham), and instead, opts to leave Holby. On social media, Owusu thanked fans for the response to her departure and commented, "I had the best time playing Nicky".

A return to the serial was unconfirmed at the time of Owusu's exit. The return of two characters was reported in December 2021, but their identities were kept under embargo. Nicky and Zosia March (Camilla Arfwedson) were revealed as the returnees in the show's 1089th episode as part of the twenty-third and final series, originally broadcast on 14 December 2021. Owusu made a cameo appearance at the end of the episode ahead of a full return in January 2022.

== Reception ==
Sophie Dainty of Digital Spy expressed her love for the character of Nicky and was pleased to learn she would be involved in a more prominent stories. She later branded Nicky a "fun-loving medic". In regards to her money woes, David Hollingsworth from What's on TV things were "rapidly spiralling out of control for the cash-strapped medic." Another writer from the publication branded Nicky a "feisty" character. Their colleague Victoria Wilson called her a "young and ambitious" doctor.

Inside Soap's Tyler described a newly arrived Nicky as "full of beans" but noted her experiences at work are "no walk in the park". She also thought that Nicky's actions went "from bad to worse" during her debt storyline. Sue Haasler writing for Metro reviewed the episode featuring Nicky's encounters with Dan. She opined that "sometimes Nicky comes across as quite cocky and confident, but this episode showed she really isn't." The critic was not impressed with Nicky and Meena's double act. She called it a "fairly immature" friendship and tired rivalry story that never seemed to develop into anything bigger. She said they constantly spent their screen time "sulking, sniping and competing with each other", an attitude Haasler believed was unhelpful to the patients. Haasler later praised Owusu's comedic performances, branding her "really funny" during her "hilariously impressed" behaviour towards consultant Kian Madani (Ramin Karimloo).
