= Man Down (Holby City) =

- Holby City episode
- Episode no.: Series 20; Episode 35
- Directed by: Tracey Rooney
- Written by: Michelle Lipton
- Original air date: 28 August 2018
- Running time: 58 minutes

Guest appearances
- Luke Higgins as Connor Barrat; Hiran Abeysekera as Tyler Saba; Madeleine Bowyer as Ruth Barrat; Gary Finan as Martin Barrat; Angela Yeoh as Helen Watton

Episode chronology
← Previous "All Business"	Next → "Keep Your Friends Close"
- Holby City series 20

"Man Down" is the thirty-fifth episode of the twentieth series of the British medical drama television series Holby City, and the 938th episode of the overall series. The episode was written by Michelle Lipton and directed by Tracey Rooney, and premiered on BBC One on 28 August 2018. The plot sees Sacha Levy (Bob Barrett), who has depression, contemplate suicide on the roof of Holby City Hospital after the death of long-term patient Connor Barrat (Luke Higgins), with whom he has bonded. The episode features flashbacks to scenes set at key moments within the previous year, which are portrayed from Sacha's perspective. Lipton reread scripts from the past year when developing the flashbacks.

The episode was announced on 10 August 2018, where the show's executive producer, Simon Harper, teased the exploration of a year in the mind of a "beloved, vulnerable character". The episode serves as a climax to a story exploring Sacha's mental health, which began in series 18 (2016). Barrett felt honoured to have a whole episode assigned to the story. Holby City worked with the British mental health charity Mind to accurately portray the story and Barrett researched the subject further, speaking to friends and medical professionals with mental health issues and those who have attempted suicide.

Filming for the episode took place at the BBC Elstree Centre studios and involved filming on the rooftop across two days. To showcase Sacha's agitation on the roof, Rooney opted to use a camera on a gimbal rather than a traditional Steadicam, which Barrett felt benefited his performance. For Sacha's suicidal scenes, Barrett had to walk onto the edge of the roof using only a harness and rope; he chose to perform his own stunts rather than use a stuntman. The actor suffers from vertigo and was initially scared about filming on the roof, but he channelled his fears into his acting.

"Man Down" was promoted through a series of trailers and cast members being interviewed on television. The episode received a positive response from television critics. Cydney Yeates of the Daily Star and Duncan Lindsay of the Metro agreed that it was "one of [Holby City's] most emotional episodes to date". Lindsay's colleague, Sue Haasler, also enjoyed the episode, calling it "a powerful hour of television" with excellent performances from the core cast. The episode was submitted as the show's entry at the 2019 Broadcast Awards, where judges praised Rooney's direction and Lipton's character development.

== Plot ==
Sacha Levy (Bob Barrett) and Ric Griffin (Hugh Quarshie), consultants in general surgery, are operating on Connor Barrat (Luke Higgins), who has Crohn's disease, when he suffers a haemorrhage and cannot be resuscitated. Sacha goes to the roof of the hospital, closely followed by Ric, who tries comforting Sacha. Flashbacks from the past year depict a close bond developing between Sacha and Connor. In the present day, Sacha admits to Ric that he was depressed, (Note: As depicted in the series 19 episode "Two Hearts".) but Ric struggles to understand its relevance to Connor. Flashbacks show Sacha meeting Connor and his parents, Ruth Barrat (Madeleine Bowyer) and Martin Barrat (Gary Finan), and a dejected Sacha finding Connor vomiting. (Note: As depicted in the series 19 episode "It Has to Be Now".) After admitting Connor to hospital, they discuss their relationships. In the present day, Ric berates Sacha for using Connor as emotional support and states that he is still depressed, which Sacha angrily denies. As Ric reminds Sacha of his importance at the hospital, Sacha remembers when his friends did not need him. (Note: As depicted in the series 19 episodes "Group Animal" and series 20 episode "Ready or Not".) Sacha tells Ric that Connor was the only person who has needed him.

In a flashback, Connor supports Sacha following the hospital shooting. (Note: As depicted in the series 19 episodes "Group Animal".) In the present day, Ric questions Sacha and Connor's relationship, before comparing himself to Sacha. Flashbacks show Connor helping Sacha impress Patricia Ghraoui (Sirine Saba). (Note: As depicted in the series 20 episodes "Only a Word" and "The Friend Zone".) Sacha confronts Ric about his research project, triggering a flashback where he is belittled. (Note: As depicted in the series 20 episode "Belonging".) Ric warns Sacha to "man up", so Sacha leaves the roof and returns to Connor, where he performs shemira over Connor's body. Connor's friend, Tyler Saba (Hiran Abeysekera), who also has Crohn's, arrives and offers to continue the reading while Sacha speaks to Ruth and Martin.

Sacha fast-tracks Connor's post-mortem and as he watches the examination, flashbacks show the build-up to Connor's operation, ending with Ric announcing his death in theatre. Pathologist Helen Watton (Angela Yeoh) confirms that Sacha could not have changed the outcome. Alone, he breaks down in tears. After being thanked by Connor's parents, Sacha says goodbye to his friends. Consultant general surgeon Serena Campbell (Catherine Russell) tells Ric to apologise to Sacha. Sacha returns to the hospital roof and flashbacks of events from the past year depict his thoughts. Ric locates Sacha and talks him down from the edge; Sacha confides in Ric about his mental health. As Sacha leaves the hospital, Tyler asks him to become his consultant and operate on him. He explains that Sacha bettered Connor's life, so Sacha tentatively agrees following a break.

== Production ==
=== Background ===
Holby City scripted a new storyline for character Sacha Levy (Bob Barrett) focusing on his mental health and male depression, which began in 2016 with the character's separation from Essie Harrison (Kaye Wragg). Across the storyline, Sacha's relationship with his family breaks down, his research project, which he invested money in, collapses, Essie is diagnosed with cancer and his friend Jac Naylor (Rosie Marcel) is shot. Barrett explained that Sacha feels "impotent" when he cannot help Essie and Jac. The actor told Sue Haasler, writing for the Metro, that Sacha believes that his woes are not as important as those of other characters who have suffered traumatic experiences, but also pointed out that every individual suffers in their own way.

Following the initial setup of the story, it was not prominently explored again for a while. Barrett thought that the audience would believe the story had been dropped but promised that it would be featured subtly. He explained that the writers wanted to portray Sacha as "pretending that everything's fine". Throughout the story, Sacha hides his depression from his friends and colleagues, which Barrett pointed out that he did well since he dislikes admitting his own problems.

=== Research ===
Holby City worked with the British mental health charity Mind to accurately portray Sacha's depression and consulted them during the production of "Man Down". Jenni Regan, a media manager for the charity, was impressed with the show's portrayal of male mental health issues and thought it was a good choice to use the character of Sacha to do so. The charity placed people with experience of mental health problems in contact with the show so that writers could develop scripts. Harper was thankful for Mind's help with the storyline, while guest actor Luke Higgins tweeted that he was "proud" to work alongside the charity for the story. Barrett noted that through storylines such as Sacha's depression, Holby City has displayed an ability to give issue-led stories "justice". He wanted to use the show's large viewership to alter the opinion on mental illness and hoped that people suffering from depression would speak about their problems after watching the episode.

Having previously researched the subject for the storyline, Barrett performed a more detailed study into male depression and suicide for "Man Down", specifically about male mental illness within the medical profession. He spoke in detail with friends suffering from depression, which he felt was important for his portrayal, and also spoke with medical professionals who suffer from mental illness. The actor drew on experiences with friends who have attempted suicide, noting that "the worse it is, the more they have tried to hide it." The research allowed Barrett to gain a better personal understanding of depression and helped him think about the subject more. Barrett praised the decision to raise awareness for mental health and suicide in a male doctor. He commented, "it's especially frowned upon for a doctor to talk about suffering from depression because their job is to care for other people, so it's a really important story to tell." He told a reporter from The Sunday Post that medical professionals are scared of "self-doubt" and are good at keeping their emotions hidden.

=== Conception and development ===
"Brilliant writer Michelle Lipton shines a light on the vital issue of male mental health and how it can slip under the radar because of the reluctance of many men like Sacha who avoid seeking help for fear of appearing weak."

— Executive producer Simon Harper on the script of "Man Down".

On 10 August 2018, it was announced that Holby City would broadcast a special episode focusing on Sacha's depression. The episode features scenes from previous episodes that are portrayed from Sacha's mindset, allowing for a "haunting insight" into how Sacha is feeling. Rachel McGrath of the HuffPost called "Man Down" a complete change in format for the show. A BBC Online editor billed the episode as "a gripping episode of Holby City which takes you behind Sacha's smile and into his mind." The show's executive producer, Simon Harper, described the episode as "incredibly important" and praised Barrett's performance, calling it "absolutely heart-breaking". He added that the episode would follow "one troubled year in the life of one beloved, vulnerable character."

When producers informed Barrett about their plans to explore Sacha's depression story again in a stylised format, he did not realise that they were referring to a whole episode of the series being assigned to the story. He said that when he realised, he was "unbelievably touched". The episode was written by Michelle Lipton, directed by Tracey Rooney and produced by Irma Inniss. Lipton reread all the scripts from the episodes in the year-long storyline when creating the flashback scenes. The flashbacks were set at key moments across the year, including the death of Essie's husband, Raf di Lucca (Joe McFadden), and Jac's breakdown following her sister's death. Barrett explained that Sacha has struggled "privately" with these moments. The actor enjoyed the flashbacks and called Lipton "an amazing writer" who created "an incredible script". He added that Sacha's characterisation helps the episode to become "truthful". Harper also enjoyed the script, praising Lipton's writing. Rooney expressed on social networking site Twitter how proud she was about the episode. She described it as "tremendously powerful" and praised the performances of the core cast members. Barrett also expressed a sense of responsibility in ensuring the story was accurately portrayed.

Marcel confirmed in a May 2018 interview with Inside Soap that a main character would be killed off, although she did not confirm who it would be. Following a July 2018 episode, fans began to speculate that Sacha could be the character who dies when he kills himself. Duncan Lindsay of the Metro reported that the show would not confirm whether Sacha dies.

"Man Down" sees Sacha's mental health story reach a climax as he goes to the hospital roof and attempts suicide. Simon Timblick, writing for What's on TV, reported that Sacha would go to the roof "in the devastating aftermath of losing a favourite patient." During the scenes set in previous episodes, a relationship between Sacha and teenage patient Connor Barrat (Luke Higgins) is established. The introduction of a character unrelated to the hospital gives Sacha the opportunity to unload his problems, strengthening their bond. Barrett noted that Sacha has become too emotionally invested in Connor, which is something that doctors should avoid doing. Sacha promises to Connor that he shall save his life; Barrett explained that Sacha believes that if he can save Connor, his problems will be alright. When Connor dies in surgery, Sacha loses hope and considers suicide on the hospital roof. Barrett told What's on TV's Victoria Wilson that for Sacha, Connor's death is "the straw that breaks the camel's back". He also told Laura-Jayne Tyler of Inside Soap that when Connor dies, Sacha is "tormented by his feelings of uselessness and inner turmoil". When on the hospital roof, Sacha is found by Ric Griffin (Hugh Quarshie), who tells Sacha to "man up", which Barrett said sends Sacha on a "spiral of despair" as he thinks that he would not be missed. Quarshie blamed Ric's lack of empathy on the "old school ethos" that Sacha should be a professional and carry on with his job, which he thought was well observed by Lipton. He explained that Ric believes he is giving Sacha "tough love" without realising the severity of Sacha's situation.

Sacha visits Connor in the mortuary, before suffering a breakdown in the staffroom. Barrett found the breakdown emotionally exhausting to film, but did not struggle with the scenes. He also told Wilson (What's on TV) that he was not affected by the episode until he was away from work during the following week. After his breakdown, Sacha says his "goodbyes" to his friends, Jac, Essie and Dominic Copeland (David Ames). Barrett explained that Sacha believes that all of his friends can cope without him. Sacha subsequently returns to the hospital roof, where he plans to kill himself. Barrett explained that Sacha does not think anybody will stop him. He told Tyler (Inside Soap) that Sacha does not delay in going to the edge of the roof because he is confident in his actions. Quarshie pointed out that when he goes to the roof, Sacha has reached his emotional "limit". Whilst in the car park, Ric spots Sacha on the edge of the hospital roof and rushes to speak with him. Ric finds Sacha crying, preparing to jump from the roof, but persuades Sacha not to jump, saving his life. Barrett pointed out that even though Sacha leaves the edge of the roof, he is still in a suicidal mindset. Off-screen, Barrett and Quarshie are close friends and they believed that their friendship helped their portrayal of the scenes. At the end of the episode, Connor's best friend, Tyler Saba (Hiran Abeysekera), who suffers from the same condition that Connor suffered with, asks Sacha to be his doctor. Barrett stated that this moment helps Sacha realises that he can "move on with his life". The actor told Haasler (Metro) that he enjoyed working with Higgins and Abeysekera and praised their performances.

=== Filming ===
Sacha's suicidal scenes set on the hospital roof were filmed on the rooftop of the BBC Elstree Centre studios, where Holby City is filmed. Rooney dubbed the hospital roof "iconic" and pointed out that it had become a focal location to character's dramas. Rooftop filming took place over two days. On the first day, shooting focused on Sacha's initial visit to the roof where he is portrayed as agitated. Rooney wanted to showcase Sacha's agitation and "freedom to go almost wherever he wants", so she asked Barrett to move freely around the roof. To capture this, Rooney decided that rather than using the traditional Steadicam, they would use a camera on a gimbal, which would allow the cameraperson to follow Barrett around the roof freely. Rooney thought it allowed Barrett a "sense of movement" and observed that it created flares on the camera, which she wanted. Barrett believed that the use of the gimbal benefited his performance as he could freely "express what Sacha was going through".

The second day on the rooftop included filming the stunt scenes of Barrett on the ledge of the roof. Barrett performed his own scenes on the roof and did not use a stuntman. He explained that he decided to pursue the challenge of filming on the rooftop since it is an important aspect of "Man Down". Barrett wore a harness and rope, which was attached to Paul, the stunt coordinator, who ensured he would not fall during the scenes filmed on the edge of the roof. While Paul is featured in the shot, he and the rope were edited out during post-production. The actor was grateful for Paul's support during filming. Wearing the harness and rope, Barrett had to walk onto the roof and step over the railing onto the edge of the roof in a single take. In the prior rehearsals of the scene, the stunt was performed by a stuntman. The scene was shot with a drone and featured a wide shot of the roof, which meant the crew had to hide into a corner of the roof. Rooney expressed her amazement at the scenes, which she deemed "deeply impressive" and effective.

Barrett suffers from vertigo and had to warn the producers about it before filming the scenes. The actor told Wilson (What's on TV) that he was initially scared about filming on the roof, but calmed down when he approached the situation. When filming on the rooftop edge, he looked out to the horizon, but after becoming comfortable, he looked down towards the ground and almost fainted. Barrett thought that his fears about filming on the rooftop helped his performance. The actor felt comfortable around the rest of the crew during filming, which he credited to the cast and crew understanding the enormity of the episode. He compared the atmosphere to that during the filming of the eighteenth series episode "I'll Walk You Home", which features the death of a regular character.

== Promotion and broadcast ==
External videos
- "Inside Sacha's mind" A promotional trailer for the episode
- "Broken Promises"; A preview clip for the episode

"Man Down" was promoted heavily in the press, and to promote the episode, Barrett and Regan appeared on BBC Breakfast on 27 August 2018. The following day, Barrett and Quarshie featured on The One Show on 28 August 2018, also promoting the episode. The show promoted the episode through trailers. A promotional trailer for "Man Down" was released on 11 August 2018. The trailer sees Sacha insist he is not depressed, before considering suicide. Sue Haasler of the Metro thought that the trailer was "gut-wrenching [...] to watch". After the broadcast of the episode, a five-minute behind-the-scenes video was released on the show's website, featuring an interview with Barrett and Rooney about "Man Down".

The episode premiered on BBC One on 28 August 2018 and was available to watch on BBC iPlayer for thirty days after its broadcast. It was also repeated on BBC Two on 3 September 2018.

== Reception ==
=== Ratings ===
Official ratings from the Broadcasters' Audience Research Board showed that 3.49 million people had watched the episode on BBC One and BBC iPlayer within 7 days of the original broadcast, making it the 24th most-watched programme on BBC One in its week of transmission. Within 28 days of the original broadcast, the viewership for BBC One increased to 3.65 million.

=== Accolades ===
Holby City was nominated for "Best soap or continuing drama" at the 2019 Broadcast Awards. "Man Down" was submitted as their entry to the awards and although the drama did not win, judges praised the episode and the exploration of Sacha's mental health. Judges liked Rooney's direction, which they called "innovative", and Lipton's character development.

=== Critical response ===
The episode received a positive response from critics and viewers alike, which prompted the show to send out a message of thanks on behalf of the cast and crew, who said they were "overwhelmed" by the response. Jack Wetherill of the Daily Star branded the episode "powerful", while his colleague, Cydney Yeates, and Lindsay (Metro) agreed that it was "one of [Holby City's] most emotional episodes to date". Lindsay's colleague, Haasler, liked the episode and opined that "Man Down" is "tense and dramatic". The Daily Express' Helen Kelly called the episode "hard-hitting". Wilson of What's on TV dubbed the episode "emotionally-charged". Jennifer Rodger and Tricia Martin of the Daily Mirror liked "Man Down" and included it in their "top picks" of the week.

Calli Kitson, writing for Digital Spy, praised the episode and opined that Barrett accurately portrays someone struggling with depression. Yeates felt that the episode was "important" and noticed that viewers were "filled with dread" watching "Man Down". She also pointed out that they were "overwhelmed" by the episode and liked the fact that mental health was highlighted. One viewer praised Holby City for their work on the episode, which they described as "powerful and heart-wrenching". Quarshie praised the episode and Barrett's performance for its accurate reflection of the development of depression. He later named "Man Down" as the "most rewarding episode" he has been involved in and was pleased that the episode received a positive response.

"It was a powerful hour of television and an incredible piece of work from Bob Barrett, and hopefully it will underline that it’s always best to seek out help before things get too much."

— Sue Haasler of the Metro on "Man Down".

Haasler wrote a review of "Man Down" for the Metro, describing it as "a beautiful, heart-breaking, heart-stopping episode". She enjoyed the episode's script, calling it "densel-packed [and] detailed", and liked how the flashbacks were included alongside the present-day scenes. Within the script, Haasler also liked the responses from Ric when he first encounters Sacha on the rooftop; for this moment, she praised Lipton's script and Quarshie's performance. She also praised the change in Ric's behaviour between the beginning and end of the episode. She also praised Rooney's direction of the episode, noting an "amazing" overhead shot of Sacha on the rooftop as Ric spotted him. She stated that the shot "took [her] breath away". The reviewer also noted how aesthetically pleasing the episode appeared, comparing it to a feature film or headline dramas such as Line of Duty. She added, "The production team all show real ambition and vision in the way they bring the stories to the screen."

Haasler praised the performances of Barrett and Quarshie and pointed out that they were "completely immersed in their characters and in the moment". She also regarded the character of Connor as "brave and funny and understanding" and praised both Higgins and Abeysekera for their portrayals of Connor and Tyler. In her extended review, Haasler also explained why it was important that Connor was portrayed to be "loveable" as it helps the audience understand why Sacha is so upset. She also liked Tyler asking for Sacha's help at the end of the episode. Finally, Haasler opined that a highlight of the episode was Sacha, and then Tyler, praying at Connor's bedside following his death, as well as Sacha saying goodbye to his friends.
