= Jason Haynes =

Fictional character from BBC medical drama Holby City

- Holby City character
- Jules Robertson as Jason Haynes
- First appearance: "A Partnership, Literally"; 9 February 2016
- Last appearance: "Episode 1102"; 29 March 2022
- Portrayed by: Jules Robertson

In-universe information
- Occupation: Porter (prev. Clinical audit assistant)
- Family: Marjorie Haynes (mother); Serena Campbell (aunt); Elinor Campbell (cousin)
- Spouse: Greta Allinson (2018–)
- Children: Guinevere Elinor Haynes (daughter)

Jason Haynes is a fictional character from the BBC medical drama Holby City, played by Jules Robertson. He first appeared in the series eighteen episode "A Partnership, Literally", broadcast on 9 February 2016, and stayed until the show's final episode: "Episode 1102", which was broadcast on 29 March 2022.

Jason arrives at Holby City hospital to work as a porter after being introduced as the nephew of Consultant Serena Campbell (Catherine Russell).

Robertson was cast after he impressed producers after auditioning against several other actors. Jason has Asperger syndrome and Robertson is the first autistic actor to play an autistic character in an ongoing role. Robertson has stated that his own experience with autism helped him portray Jason accurately. He is characterised as a nice man, who Robertson describes as "geeky and shy" and lacking a sense of humour.

Jason and Serena were unacquainted and it takes time for her to accept Jason into her family. Jason is transformed from a character who needed full-time care in supported accommodation to becoming an independent adult. Jason stories have focused on his connection with Serena and working as a hospital porter. Jason also involves himself in medical cases on the Acute admissions unit. Producers created a relationship with Greta Allinson (Zoe Croft), who also has Asperger syndrome. The pair become parents to Guinevere, which Serena was initially apprehensive about Jason's ability to cope. Jason also had a ruptured liver after being run over by his cousin Elinor Campbell (Amy McCallum).

Jason's inclusion in Holby City has prompted praise from autism charities such as the National Autistic Society and Ambitious about Autism. Rachael Sigee from the Evening Standard believed it was of the utmost importance that an autistic actor played the role. Juliet Rieden of The Australian Women's Weekly branded Jason a "breakthrough role" and a television first. The positive response to the character led him being developed into a long-term role.

== Casting ==
The character and casting details were announced in February 2016. Robertson's agent secured him the audition which he attended in 2015 and competed with several actors for the part. He told Juliet Rieden from The Australian Women's Weekly that "I auditioned and I was so flawless and so smooth that they decided it was my shot." Of his role success the actor, who has autism, said "I was really apprehensive but tinged with pride that I had been given this great opportunity. I was nervous about the challenge and did not know whether I would enjoy it but I was determined to do my best."

The actor began filming in October 2015 and he became part of the show's semi-regular cast. The cast initially had concerns about an autistic actor coping with fast pace nature of filming. Upon working with Robertson they witnessed his acting talent which quashed any concern. The series producer Simon Harper added that the actor was "a joy to have around". Robertson initially found working on Holby City difficult because he found it stressful and physically exhausted. He felt that after he filmed his first block of episodes that he became more relaxed and comfortable with the role.

Like the actor, Jason has Asperger syndrome. Robertson is the first autistic actor to play an autistic character in an ongoing BBC drama. The actor said that he hoped his casting would make television producers more inclined to hire autistic actors. He added that "I'm hoping my character on Holby will inspire parents of kids that have autism or Asperger's that their kids can make it as well." Robertson's mother Kathy Lette said that securing the role helped her son's confidence and added that it showed those who had bullied Robertson because of his autism that they were wrong. In June 2016, it was reported that the character was working well and that Robertson would stay on the show as the character was further developed.

== Development ==
=== Introduction and characterisation ===
I hope that I'm seen as a role model. I hope that I'm encouraging people with other conditions or people who are on the spectrum and have autism or mild learning difficulties. If they watch me on Holby City I hope I'm showing them that it can happen for them and they shouldn't lose faith and hope.

— Robertson on what he hoped the role of Jason could help achieve. (2016).

Jason was introduced as the nephew of Serena Campbell (Catherine Russell). After Serena learned that her long-lost sister was dead, she emailed Jason asking to meet him and he turned up at Holby during Serena's shift. Russell explained that Serena was only expecting a reply, but because of his Asperger syndrome he takes the message literally and shows up. Serena tries to understand his condition in the hope that they can build a relationship. Russell said that it was a story of uncertainty over Serena succeeding in understanding Jason and keeping him in her life. She added that it would be interesting to see how Serena's mistakes impact on Jason's life. A publicist from BBC Online describes Serena as becoming a "protective aunt" to Jason. Following his introduction Robertson received praise from viewers via the social networking website Twitter. He attributed this to his character's one liners stating, "the reaction has been really good, really positive. I get the best lines as well."

Robertson described Jason as "really nice and sensitive with a deadpan sense of humour and a genuine desire to do good". He also said Jason's Asperger's causes him to take things said to him literally, which does cause problems for him and Serena. Robertson added that his character was "more geeky and shy" than himself. The actor has stated that before filming he converses with the cast and crew about techniques to "present Jason as a human character." The character has a different type of Asperger syndrome than the actor's condition. Jason also has an obsession with learning medical terms. While interviewed by Amanda Holden, the actor described Jason as "a very sweet young man, a very nice man" but felt he lacked a sense of humour. He also thinks that Jason lacks self-confidence.

=== Job role and accident ===
Victoria Wilson from What's on TV revealed that Jason would end up in Serena's care. The story begins when Jason's carer Allan Coalville (Geoffrey Lumb) collapses and is admitted to the Acute admissions unit (AAU). Jason is concerned for Allan's health and is upset when she confirms he has had a stroke. Following surgery Allan has another stroke and Serena saves his life. She tells Jason that Allan will no longer be able to look after him and she worries about abandoning her nephew. Jason later takes employment as a porter at the hospital.

Serena's daughter Elinor Campbell (Amy McCallum) visits the hospital but Serena is too busy to entertain Elinor. Jason informs her that Serena is no longer the deputy CEO of the hospital. This causes an argument between Serena and Elinor, who gets in her car to drive off. Serena steps in front of her vehicle but Elinor does not stop. Jason pushes Serena out of the way and gets hit by the car instead. Jason has a ruptured liver and Serena's partner Bernie Wolfe (Jemma Redgrave) battles to save his life in the operating theatre. Bernie and Morven Digby (Eleanor Fanyinka) are successful in surgery and Jason survives. Serena thanks him for saving her life. Shortly after Elinor collapses and dies. Jason takes three months off work to recover from his injuries. Elinor's death effects Jason and he visits a grief counsellor.

When Jason and registrar Xavier Duval (Marcus Griffiths) witness Sian Evans (Ajjaz Awad) thrown from a vehicle in the hospital car park, they go to help and discover a stab wound. Jason stems the bleeding by applying pressure with his jumper. Xavier thanks Jason for helping to save Sian, but becomes annoyed with him when he becomes fixated on helping with the rest of the case. Xavier loses his patience and angrily informs Jason that he is just a porter. They then discovers that the unconscious Sian has a baby, and Jason tracks down the car and helps reunite the mother and baby.

=== Relationship with Greta Allinson ===
"Jason is about to have a baby with Greta, and if you bear in mind where his character began - needing full time care - to have him in that situation without any help, or so Serena thinks, is a bit untenable."

—Russell on Serena's attitude to Jason fathering a child. (2018)

Producers introduced a love interest for the character in 2018, Greta Allinson (Zoe Croft). The character also has Asperger syndrome. She is admitted to AAU where Serena treats her. Greta tells Serena she cannot treat her because she is Jason's aunt. It is then revealed that Greta is pregnant and Serena expresses her concerns about Jason's ability to cope. Greta confronts Serena telling her that she and Jason can cope with the child. Russell believed that Serena does not think Jason and Greta will cope because Jason needed full-time care when she first met him. Serena rethinks her stance and offers to help support them both.

Serena interferes again when she presumes that Jason and Greta will move in with her following the babies birth. Greta becomes annoyed with Serena's overbearing nature. She confronts Serena and states that the family will live in her flat. She then realises that she is only interfering because she misses her partner Bernie, who now works in Nairobi. When Bernie returns from working in Nairobi, she asks Serena why she stayed on at the hospital. A Holby City publicist the told Tyler from Inside Soap that it was because "her nephew Jason and his other half Greta are due to have a baby - and heavily rely on Serena, of course!"

Greta is then admitted to AAU again and Bernie tries to treat an uncooperative Greta. She declares that Bernie is Jason's family, which is unethical, which leaves Bernie "humbled". Despite this she diagnoses Greta with lactose intolerance and states the baby is safe. Greta later gives birth to a baby girl named Guinevere and a patient makes Jason worried about what would happen to his partner and daughter if he was to die.

Harper teased the wedding during November 2018 and revealed that they had hired musician and priest Richard Coles to play Henry de Havilland, who would officiate the on-screen ceremony. Jason and Greta's service was due to be conducted by chaplain Lexy Morrell (Jenny Howe) who was impaled by a shard of glass when a church roof collapses. Jason enlists Xavier's help to ensure the wedding still goes ahead. Xavier gets the hospital gardens ready and organises the ceremony there. Jason's colleagues Dominic Copeland (David Ames) and Lofty Chiltern (Lee Mead) also join the celebrations for a double ceremony. Harper branded it a "joyous episode celebrating love and commitment in all their diverse forms."

Greta is later hit by a car and is taken to AAU with a broken leg. Greta required urgent surgery that only Serena could perform due to staff absences. Serena takes on the risky operation despite it being unethical. Serena is successful and saves Greta's leg. On his first day back to work following Greta's accident, Jason is unable to cope. Serena suggests he put on earphones to keep him calm. When consultant Ange Godard (Dawn Steele) notices this she is rude to him not realising he has Asperger syndrome.

== Reception ==
The British charity National Autistic Society shortlisted Holby City in the drama category at the 2017 Autism Uncut media awards because of Jason's portrayal. Access All Areas branded Jason "a wonderfully funny young man with Aspergers." Alan Shaw from The Sunday Post said that Robertson provides a "unique insight into what makes Jason Haynes such a special character, as he himself is a young man with Asperger's." Robertson himself has stated that Jason is an important role because he helped people understand more about autism.

A writer from Ambitious about Autism stated "it is brilliant to see the character of Jason, who has autism, played by someone with autism. No one person with autism is the same, but they are brilliantly placed to bring this role to life and increase the awareness and understanding of autism." Rachael Sigee from the Evening Standard believed it was of the utmost importance that an autistic actor played the role. She stated that "it feels like an important moment for disability representation in the UK to have a recurring character with Autistic Spectrum Disorder (ASD) on a mainstream soap." Rieden of The Australian Women's Weekly branded Jason a "breakthrough role" and said it was a television first for a drama hiring an autistic actor to play an autistic character.

Shanique Joseph from the Daily Express thought that Jason and Greta had a chaotic relationship. In March 2017, the BBC included Robertson in their list of two hundred future stars, which included fifty actors. Sue Haasler writing for Metro described Jason's nuptials as a "festive, if very cold, wedding" and said the episode was "beautiful" with happiness, sadness and a "wonderful script" by writer Ed Sellek.
