= Libby Fox =

Soap opera character

- EastEnders character
- Portrayed by: Belinda Owusu
- Duration: 2006–2010, 2014–2017, 2026
- First appearance: Episode 3156; 22 May 2006
- Last appearance: Episode 7366; 17 July 2026
- Introduced by: Kate Harwood (2006); Dominic Treadwell-Collins (2014–2016); Sean O'Connor (2016); Ben Wadey (2026)
- Spin-off appearances: EastEnders: E20 (2010)
In-universe information
- Father: Owen Turner
- Mother: Denise Fox
- Stepfather: Kevin Wicks; Lucas Johnson; Jack Branning
- Half-brothers: Raymond Fox
- Half-sisters: Chelsea Fox
- Grandfathers: Ted Turner
- Grandmothers: Emerald Fox; Liz Turner
- Aunts: Kim Fox; Daphne Fox
- Nephews: Jordan Fox
- First cousins: Pearl Fox; Mica Fox

Libby Fox (initially known as "Squiggle") is a fictional character from the BBC soap opera EastEnders, played by Belinda Owusu. She made her first appearance on 22 May 2006 and left in 2010. She is the daughter of Denise Fox (Diane Parish) and Owen Turner (Lee Ross), and half-sister of Chelsea Fox (Tiana Benjamin/Zaraah Abrahams). The Fox family were introduced by executive producer Kate Harwood. The character of Libby was featured in a prominent storyline in 2006, when Owen attempts to murder her. The character then cultivates a relationship with her peer Darren Miller (Charlie G. Hawkins).

The character was axed in April 2010 and her departure episode was broadcast on 5 August 2010, when the character departs to study at Oxford University since Libby is shown to be an intelligent and competitive character. Libby returned in April 2014 as part of the beginning of the "Who Killed Lucy Beale?" storyline. She then continued to make various guest appearances until 31 January 2017. She made an unannounced return on 1 January 2026 in a flash-forward sequence to New Year's Day 2027. She returned on 16 June 2026 for a short stint. She then left on 17 July 2026.

== Creation and development ==
Early in Spring 2006, an official BBC press report announced the introduction of a new, all female family joining EastEnders, Denise Fox (Diane Parish) and her two daughters Chelsea (Tiana Benjamin) and Libby (nicknamed Squiggle), cast to Belinda Owusu, who was 16 at the time. Benjamin has revealed that she was the second Fox to be cast, and on her final audition, she had a workshop and met Diane Parish there. Owusu was cast at a later date. Tiana Benjamin who plays Chelsea has said that the three actors who play the Fox family have a bond, commenting "We all respect and understand each other, and manage to have a good time while we're filming too. I felt that we clicked from our first few scenes together."

Described as "the feisty Fox family", the characters first appeared on-screen in May 2006. An insider reportedly said to the Sunday Mirror, "They'll arrive in Albert Square with a bang and they'll cause friction from the off. The Fox girls don't take any nonsense -they'll be a force to be reckoned with." The newspaper described the character of Libby as a superbrat and teenage troublemaker. Owusu commented, "Squiggle is going to cause lots of mischief."

In April 2010, it was announced that the character had been axed along with five others by the new executive producer Bryan Kirkwood. Speaking of her departure, Owusu said: "I've had a great time playing Libby but I agree with Bryan that after four years of great storylines, it is now time for Libby to move on. EastEnders was my first real job and I have learnt so much but I am now really looking forward to trying new roles." Her final episode was broadcast on 5 August 2010.

In March 2014, it was announced that Owusu had agreed to reprise the role of Libby Fox for number of episodes from April 2014, as part of the "Who Killed Lucy Beale?" storyline. She made her on-screen return on 18 April 2014. It was again announced in July 2015 that Libby would return again for a two episode guest stint. Speaking of her return, Owusu said: "It's great to be back again! I'm always excited to see how Libby has grown and be back with the Fox family!" Libby appeared on 3 and 4 August 2015. Libby has since returned over various guest stints: on 11 December 2015, four episodes from 7 to 10 March 2016, four episodes from 22 to 27 April 2016, five episodes from 7 to 17 November 2016 and for a guest stint from 23 December 2016 to 31 January 2017.

The character made an unannounced return in the episode originally airing on 1 January 2026, which was a flashforward episode set on 1 January 2027. In June 2026, it was confirmed that Owusu would return for a short stint. Speaking of her return, Owusu said: "I am beyond thrilled to be back on the Square. Getting the Foxes back together has been such a joy, full of fun and nostalgia! It’s been 20 years since I first joined, so coming back has been like returning home!"

== Storylines ==
=== 2006–2010 ===
Libby is Denise Fox's (Diane Parish) youngest daughter. Libby secretly contacts her estranged father, Owen Turner (Lee Ross), an abusive alcoholic, and he starts making demands to see her. Denise is reluctant to allow this, but Owen seems to have changed, and Libby is keen for her parents to get back together; Denise is swayed and sleeps with Owen. However, as soon as Owen begins drinking again, he becomes abusive and hits her. He is arrested, but Libby persuades Denise to give a glowing character witness statement and he is released. Owen kidnaps Libby and takes her to Epping Forest. He drugs her and tries to kill her and himself by filling the car with noxious exhaust fumes. She escapes, but he catches her and tries to drown her in a stream. Denise arrives to find Libby unconscious on the bank. She is taken to hospital and makes a full recovery. Owen is imprisoned for 5 years.

Libby gets involved in various scams with her friend Darren Miller (Charlie G. Hawkins). She develops a crush on Gus Smith (Mohammed George), but is too young to be noticed by him, so she begins using an internet chat room, talking to a stranger named "Einstein27". She refuses to listen to Yolande Trueman's (Angela Wynter) concerns about the dangers of meeting someone online and agrees to meet him in person. When she meets the stranger, she discovers that she was chatting to Darren all along. He admits to liking Libby. She is initially unimpressed, but after Yolande arranges a meal between them, they decide to start a relationship. A few weeks later Darren visits his family in the Cotswolds, and Libby is heartbroken to discover he has decided not to return. She concentrates on her school work and achieves eleven good GCSE grades.

Darren returns some weeks later but Libby avoids him. When she finally plucks up the courage to see him, she hears him talking about someone called Clara. Thinking he has found someone new, she pretends she is going out with Tamwar Masood (Himesh Patel). It turns out Clara is a dog and the pair get back together. Libby and Darren have an anniversary dinner to celebrate a year of dating. However, Jay Brown (Jamie Borthwick) reveals that Darren frequently looks at pornography. Libby becomes furious and confides in Tamwar with whom she is in the process of starting a home tutoring business. Darren becomes jealous, but eventually reconciles with Libby and begins thinking about starting a sexual relationship with Libby. He invites her round to do this, however Jay ruins the night by telling Libby that Darren told him that she was a virgin. Libby is devastated, but she eventually comes round and she and Darren decide not to rush things.

Libby achieves A grades in her AS Level exams, leading Denise to declare that she will be applying for Oxford or Cambridge University. Libby worries her mother cannot afford to send her there. She later finds out she has conditionally been accepted at Oxford. Libby turns eighteen and Owen, who is still in prison, contacts her by sending her a birthday card and asking Libby's grandmother, Liz Turner (Kate Williams), to arrange a meeting. At the same time, Libby decides it is the right time for her to lose her virginity with Darren. She then phones her grandmother and agrees to meet with her father. Chelsea returns for Libby's birthday and sees Liz in the Square. Libby is forced to reveal that she visited Owen and that he will be released in a matter of months. Denise visits him but then tells Libby he will not be returning to their lives. Libby discovers she will attend Oxford University when she gets the A Level grades she needs but decides against it, saying her mother needs her in Walford. She later changes her mind, and leaves for Oxford early in October. Adam Best (David Proud), an Oxford student who has taken a liking to her, sends her a text message saying "See you in Oxford. X".

When Owen is released from prison, he returns to Walford to see Libby, although he is not supposed to. Denise's surrogate father Patrick Trueman (Rudolph Walker) discovers this and threatens to call the police, but instead he contacts Libby, who comes straight to Walford from Oxford to see her father. She overhears Darren booking a table for two in a restaurant and suspects he is meeting another woman. She turns up at the restaurant and finds Darren there with Owen. Darren says he wanted to ask Owen's permission to ask Libby to marry him. Libby accepts his proposal. When Lucas Johnson (Don Gilet), Denise's boyfriend and Chelsea's father, has Owen arrested for breaching his bail conditions, Libby at first doesn't believe Owen's claims but is shocked when Lucas confesses. Though angry with Lucas at first she eventually forgives him. Libby makes Owen promise to leave Denise and Lucas alone. The day before the wedding, Owen crashes Denise's hen night to warn her that Lucas killed his ex-wife Trina Johnson (Sharon Duncan-Brewster) and she is in danger.

Both Denise and Libby are angry with Owen. Owen is heartbroken and prepared to leave until Chelsea tells him about the bracelet. Unknown to everyone but Lucas, Owen hides in Phil Mitchell's (Steve McFadden) Jaguar and confronts Lucas about his crime, leading to Lucas strangling him to death and burying him in the gardens in Albert Square. Libby feels a bit guilty about parting on bad terms with her father but Liz reassures her. Darren receives a card from Heather Trott (Cheryl Fergison), which Libby opens and finds cash inside. Libby asks him about it and he says before Christmas he found Heather crying because she could not afford to buy any presents for her baby son George (Joshua Jacobs) and he felt sorry for her. Libby calls him a softie, but later overhears Heather and her friend Shirley Carter (Linda Henry) discussing Darren and the paternity of the baby. Libby reveals that Darren is George's father in front of everyone at Syed Masood (Marc Elliott) and Amira Shah's (Preeya Kalidas) wedding.

Darren tries to speak to Libby but Chelsea will not let him in. He continues to bang on the door while Denise tells Libby that she could go back to Oxford early and it is time to move on. Libby eventually talks to Darren, who explains why he slept with Heather and what happened between them. Libby then talks to Heather who says it was her fault it happened and she did not say anything as she did not want to hurt Libby. Libby then decides to leave and Darren stops her at the tube station and tells her how much he loves her, but she goes anyway. She returns from Oxford and tells her family she is now dating Adam, though Adam tells Darren that Libby she makes up for her lack of good looks by being good in bed. On hearing that Owen has supposedly sent flowers to Liz, Libby wonders why he will not get in touch with her. She steals some CCTV footage from the florists and is shocked to see Lucas ordering a huge bunch of lilies. Lucas explains to Libby that he sent Liz the flowers to buy Owen time because he is drinking again. Libby accepts this and hugs Lucas.

Libby goes back to university but returns when she learns that Lucas' son, Jordan Johnson (Michael-Joel David Stuart), is in a coma. She hears Ben Mitchell (Charlie Jones) confess in the middle of the café that he hit Jordan with a spanner and tells Lucas this. Lucas locks himself in the community centre and breaks down, blaming Jordan's condition on his own actions. Libby is worried about Lucas's state of mind and tries to coax him to come out. When she threatens to call the police, Lucas finally unlocks the doors. Lucas goes to the hospital and finds Jordan has been awoken from his coma and is safe. Libby tells Chelsea and Denise about Lucas's breakdown. Chelsea accuses her of making a mountain out of a molehill, Denise however listens intently.

Libby is devastated to learn that a body discovered buried in the Square is that of her father. After speaking to Liz, Libby disowns her as she called the police to say she thought Denise was capableof murdering Owen, and she was taken away for questioning. When Adam brings Libby flowers and says Owen must have been murdered for a reason, Libby shouts at him for patronizing her. Chelsea tells Libby that Lucas found Trina's bracelet in Denise's bag after she died, leading them to believe that Denise may have killed both Trina and Owen. They see Denise driving away from the Square alone, and receive a text message from her saying "I'm sorry". In reality, Lucas had killed Owen and confessed to Denise, taken her to a canal and strangled her, sending the text message before throwing the phone in the canal. Libby is the only person who believes that there is no way Denise could have done this and says that "sorry" could mean anything. However, the police tell the family that Denise's car has been found by the canal, before a body is pulled from the water. Libby vows to carry on as normal, but says that this is not like Denise. The police arrive and say they have found a body in the canal along with Denise's mobile. Libby and Patrick comfort each other while Lucas and Chelsea go to the mortuary, where Lucas identifies the body as Denise.

Libby discovers that Adam has been blackmailing Lucy Beale (Melissa Suffield) for sex, and dumps him after slapping him across the face, leading to him leaving Walford. She feels let down by Patrick when he does not write a eulogy for Denise, and then asks the family to leave after Denise's funeral, however, Lucas convinces him to change his mind. On the day of Denise's funeral, Libby again questions who she was. Libby is happy when Patrick gives a eulogy to Denise, but is upset when an argument starts between Liz and Denise's sisters, Kim (Tameka Empson) and Daphne (Emi Wokoma). Patrick reveals that the girls can continue to stay with him and Chelsea and Libby agree to start packing up Denise's belongings. While celebrating Libby's birthday, Denise walks in, revealing that she is not dead but that Lucas has been keeping her prisoner, and that he was the one who killed Trina and Owen. Lucas enters and confirms this, and takes the family hostage, but when Jordan arrives, they escape and Lucas is arrested. Denise is taken to hospital, and Libby has to go through the pain of attending her father's funeral. Chelsea then decides she wants to move to Spain with Liz, so Libby arranges to take time off from university to help with her mother at home. Denise disapproves of this, and arranges for Libby to go to Spain for a holiday with Chelsea and her grandmother, before returning permanently to Oxford. After tearfully saying goodbye to her family, the taxi is stopped by Darren who is upset that Libby is leaving without saying goodbye to him. Libby says that she has always loved him and that he will always be her best friend, before she leaves Walford with Chelsea and Liz.

=== 2014–2017 ===
Denise visits Libby at Oxford and she is concerned, as Denise does not like talking about her home life. Later on, Libby calmly confronts Denise, who reveals to a stunned Libby that she does not want to marry her fiancé, Ian Beale (Adam Woodyatt). Denise later rings Libby, telling her that she will end her relationship with Ian the following day. However, Ian's daughter and Libby's old friend, Lucy (now Hetti Bywater), dies in mysterious circumstances (see Who Killed Lucy Beale?) that night and after hearing about her death, Libby sends her condolences to Ian, via a text message to Denise. Libby returns to Walford a few weeks later, in order to attend Lucy's funeral. She is unhappy when she witnesses how Ian treats Denise and urges her mother to call things off with him. After staying the night at Patrick's, Libby asks Denise to go to Spain, with her for Chelsea's birthday. Denise is unsure, but Ian encourages her to go, admitting that he has taken her for granted. Denise and Libby then depart in a taxi.

Libby returns for her 24th birthday to find Denise arguing with Claudette Hubbard (Ellen Thomas) over the preparation of food for the party. Libby opens her presents then receives a secret phone call from Chelsea, and she promises to tell Denise something when she finds the right time. However, Libby cannot bring herself to tell Denise and later calls Chelsea to tell her this. Libby then leaves and returns to Oxford. She returns again for the housewarming party of Kim and her husband Vincent Hubbard (Richard Blackwood), where she reveals to Denise about how troublesome Jordan has become and how he caused trouble for her and Chelsea in Spain.

Libby returns again for Mother's Day and goes for a family dinner, where later she finds a note Denise put there saying that Lucas plans to escape prison. Libby leaves and tells Masood, who advises her to call the police and he helps her get into Denise's house, which has been locked by Jordan (now Joivan Wade), who is helping Lucas escape. Libby witnesses Jordan raging at Denise and reveals that she has reported him to the police. Jordan becomes angry with Denise and Libby and is arrested. Libby then returns to Oxford after saying goodbye to Denise and Patrick.

Libby returns upset, and tells Denise she is pregnant. Denise is overjoyed but Libby says she is having an abortion and has already taken the first of two abortion pills. Denise is against this and she gets very drunk, with only Kim supporting Libby's decision. The following day, as Libby returns to the abortion clinic to terminate her pregnancy, a hungover Denise arrives to support her alongside Kim. She then thanks Denise for being a good mother to her before leaving again. Libby returns in November after Kim calls her and is shocked to see that Denise is seven months pregnant. She vows to remain in Walford and help Denise with the birth. Denise is frustrated when Libby insists that Denise should eat only vegan food. After Denise is suspended from her job, Libby helps her get it back by threatening legal action. However, Denise tells Libby that she should not be sacrificing her life in Oxford for her, so after sharing an emotional farewell with Denise, Libby departs. Libby returns with Kim and her grandmother, Emerald Fox (Doña Croll), for the birth of her half-brother, Raymond. Libby is shocked when she learns Denise is having her son adopted, but respects her decision.

=== 2026–present ===
Libby appears in a flash forward sequence to New Years' Day 2027. She and Patrick are searching for Denise and are concerned by an unidentified caller on her phone.

When Denise finds out she has acute myeloid leukaemia, an aggressive form of blood cancer, Chelsea (now Zaraah Abrahams) informs Libby and she arrives to support her mother. As the family try to come to terms with the diagnosis, Chelsea confides in Libby that the family of her serial killer ex-husband Gray Atkins (Toby-Alexander Smith) have been sending Chelsea's son Jordan (Jahsaiah Williams) money after he was involved in a car accident. Libby finds a letter to Jordan from Gray's grandmother, Sheila Atkins (Sheila Ruskin), containing a cheque for £1,000, and gets in touch with her behind Chelsea's back. Chelsea is initially angry, but then agrees to meet with Sheila, who offers to help with Jordan's finances. Libby then returns to Oxford a few weeks later.

== Reception ==
In 2008, it was reported that Cambridge University wanted to shed its "elitist" image. Cambridge University allegedly approached the producers of Britain's three leading soaps, EastEnders, Coronation Street and Emmerdale, asking them to include the university in their storylines. Spokesman Greg Hayman said the idea was part of a bid to correct the perception that Cambridge was "not for young people from ordinary backgrounds." He added, "We're very keen to attract the brightest and best students regardless of their background. One of the better ways of communicating directly with potential students is to talk to them through the soaps and other programs they watch." This move followed government pressure for the university to become more inclusive and to target all economic backgrounds. 90% of British students attend state secondary schools; Oxford and a Cambridge Universities draw about half their student body from state schools. It was reported that working-class individuals view attending Oxford or Cambridge as an impossible dream, which university officials claim is unfair and they are hoping to dispel this by featuring the Universities in working-class soaps such as EastEnders. Hayman said there have been no firm commitments from TV producers, although one crew was planning an exploratory visit to Cambridge; however, he stated that he was happy with the plot running in EastEnders that showed "working-class teenagers Tamwar Masood and Libby Fox considering applying to Cambridge and Oxford, to the delight of their ambitious mothers", saying that "It's a very happy coincidence." Oxford University said it had no plans to write to the soaps for inclusion but a spokesperson claimed, "I did speak to somebody at EastEnders about our bursary scheme in case the storyline was going to continue. We wanted to make sure they knew what kind of assistance might be available to someone like Libby." EastEnders refused to comment on whether the universities would be featured at the time, as Tamwar and Libby still had another year left at college "and it was too early to say whether the Oxford-Cambridge plot would continue."

Reporting on the University storyline, The Guardian noted that Libby and Tamwar applying to Oxford and Cambridge could be the universities' "dream storyline", as it showed that "clever state school kids can get a place." However, the reporter added that "it could also be their worst nightmare. Young Libby is already revealing concerns that she might not be able to afford to go to the university." The paper alleged that both universities' press offices "fired off letters to the script editors: did they know about the generous bursaries and seemingly bottomless pit of cash available to help students from low-income homes stay on their courses? Could that be mentioned?".

== See also ==
- List of EastEnders: E20 characters
