= Belinda Owusu =

English actress (born 1989)

- Born: 19 April 1989 (age 37); Hackney, London, England
- Occupation: Actress
- Years active: 2005–present
- Children: 1

Belinda Owusu (born 19 April 1989) is an English actress, known for her roles as Libby Fox in the BBC soap opera EastEnders and Nicky McKendrick in BBC medical drama series Holby City.

== Early life and education ==
Owusu was born on 19 April 1989 in Hackney, London. She is of Ghanaian and English descent. She has an older brother, Jermaine Jake Owusu, born October 1987 and a younger brother Ziggy Owusu, born October 1997, who was murdered in October 2016. She attended the Anna Fiorentini Theatre and Film School, as well as Clapton Girls' Technology College.

== Career ==
In 2006, at the age of 16, she began portraying the regular role of Libby Fox in the BBC soap opera EastEnders. She stayed in the role until 2010, later appearing on a recurring basis from 2014 to 2017. Prior to getting this role, she had also appeared in a pizza advert. In 2008, Owusu was a contestant in an EastEnders special of The Weakest Link. She was the fourth one to be voted off.

In March 2011, she worked at the Nuffield Theatre, and played Desdemona in their production of William Shakespeare's Othello. In December 2017, Owusu began playing F1 doctor Nicky McKendrick in the BBC medical drama series Holby City. The character departed the series in scenes airing in March 2021 when Owusu took maternity leave. She returned in December 2021 for the show's final series.

== Personal life ==
In February 2021, she confirmed that she and her long-term partner Michael Mackin were expecting their first child, announcing that she was 40 weeks pregnant. Owusu later shared two months later that she had given birth to a daughter. When she returned to Holby City after her maternity leave, Owusu's daughter portrayed her character's daughter Juliet. Speaking to Elaine Reilly of What to Watch, the actress explained that she was pleased with the decision as she got to spend extra time with her daughter.

== Filmography ==
Year	Title	Role	Notes
2006–2010, 2014–2017, 2026-	EastEnders	Libby Fox	Regular role
2010	EastEnders: E20	Libby Fox	1 episode
2017–2022	Holby City	Nicky McKendrick	Main role
2019	Casualty	Nicky McKendrick	1 episode
2023, 2025	Doctor Who	Woman with Pram / Receptionist	2 episodes
2024	Father Brown	Audrey Hatby	1 episode
2024	Trigger Point	Female Officer	1 episode
2024	Only Child	Dr Roach	1 episode
2025	The Bombing of Pan Am 103	Mum at Heathrow Airport	1 episode
