= List of Footballers' Wives characters =

The following is a list of actors/actresses featured in the five series' of the United Kingdom TV series Footballers' Wives.

== Series 1 ==
- Zöe Lucker as Tanya Turner (Series 1–5)
- Gillian Taylforth as Jackie Pascoe (Series 1–5)
- Alison Newman as Hazel Bailey (Series 1–4)
- Gary Lucy as Kyle Pascoe (Series 1–3)
- Susie Amy as Chardonnay Lane-Pascoe (Series 1–2) - a parody of Jordan
- Cristian Solimeno as Jason Turner (Series 1–2)
- John Forgeham as Frank Laslett (Series 1–3)
- Julie Legrand as Jeanette Dunkley (Series 1–2, 4; crossed over to Footballers' Wives: Extra Time (recurring)
- Daniel Schutzmann as Salvatore Biagi (Series 1–2)
- Nathan Constance as Ian Walmsley (Series 1–2)
- Katherine Monaghan as Donna Walmsley (Series 1–2)
- Philip Bretherton as Stefan Hauser (Series 1–2)
- Micaiah Dring as Marie Minshull (Series 1)

== Series 2 ==
- Peter Ash as Darius Fry (Series 2–5; crossed over to Footballers' Wives: Extra Time)
- Jessica Brooks as Freddie Hauser (Series 2)

== Series 3 ==
- Laila Rouass as Amber Gates (Series 3–5) - a parody of Victoria Beckham
- Ben Price as Conrad Gates (Series 3–4) - a parody of David Beckham
- Jesse Birdsall as Roger Webb (Series 3–5)
- Sarah Barrand as Shannon Donnelly/Lawson (Series 3–5) - initially a parody of Coleen McLoughlin
- Jamie Davis as Harley Lawson (Series 3–4)
- Marcel McCalla as Noah Alexander (Series 3–4) - a parody of Justin Fashanu
- Caroline Chikezie as Elaine Hardy (Series 3)

== Series 4 ==
- Helen Latham as Lucy Milligan (Series 4–5)
- Ben Richards as Bruno Milligan (Series 4–5)
- Tom Swire as Sebastian Webb (Series 4; crossed over to Footballers' Wives: Extra Time)

== Series 5 ==
- Craig Gallivan as Callum Watson (Series 5)
- Lucia Giannecchini as Urszula Rosen (Series 5)
- Phina Oruche as Liberty Baker (Series 5) - a parody of British model Naomi Campbell.
- Angela Ridgeon as Trisha Watson (Series 5)
- Jay Rodan as Paulo Bardosa (Series 5)
- Chucky Venice as Tremaine Gidigbi (Series 5)
- Nicholas Ball as Garry Ryan (Series 5; crossed over from Footballers' Wives: Extra Time)

== Guest/recurring roles ==
- Paula Wilcox as Marguerite Laslett (Series 1)
- Lee-Anne Baker as Lara Bateman (Series 1–2)
- Chad Shepherd as Ron Bateman (Series 1–4)
- Julie Legrand as Janette Dunkley (Series 1–2, 4; crossed over to Footballers' Wives: Extra Time Series 2)
- Camilla Beeput as Bethany Mortimer (Series 4)
- Elaine Glover as Katie Jones (Series 4; crossed over to Footballers' Wives: Extra Time Series 1)
- Joan Collins as Eva de Wolffe (Series 5)

== Bibliography ==
- Website reference for Footballers' Wives - Characters A - L and Footballers' Wives - Characters M - Z
