= Tanya Turner =

- Footballers' Wives character
- Zöe Lucker as Tanya Turner
- Portrayed by: Zöe Lucker
- First appearance: Getting a Result
- Last appearance: "The Last Ever Ever Footballers' Wives"
- Created by: Maureen Chadwick; Ann McManus
- Crossover appearances: Bad Girls (Series 6)
In-universe information
- Siblings: Anika Beevor (half-sister)
- Spouse: Jason Turner (1994–2002); Francis Michael "Frank" Laslett (2003–2004); Juan Frederico (2005–2006)
- Children: Pundarik Gates

Tanya Louise Turner (also Laslett and Frederico) is a fictional character on the ITV drama Footballers' Wives, and also briefly appeared on the drama Bad Girls. Tanya is portrayed by English actress Zöe Lucker and is one of only two characters credited in every series from the pilot episode to the series cancellation after series 5, along with Jackie Pascoe, played by Gillian Taylforth. Her role within the series changed frequently; throughout some storylines she is considered to be an antagonist whereas in others she is the main protagonist.

The character is well known for her ruthless, cold and calculating behaviour. She is intelligent and independent and has been married three times, with each marriage resulting in her husband's death. American magazine TV Guide said "You'd have to go all the way back to Dynasty's Alexis Colby to find a saucier British TV import than Tanya Turner".

Tanya was voted tenth in Virgin Media's Top 10 TV criminals poll, for her involvement in the death of her second husband, Frank Laslett and for her frequent use of cocaine.

== Fictional character biography ==
=== Series One ===
Just a friendly warning for the future, you go anywhere near my husband again and it’ll take more than Botox to sort your face out!

Tanya was originally married to the womanising captain of Earls Park Football Club, Jason Turner (Cristian Solimeno). Their relationship was stormy yet very strong even though Tanya knew of Jason's extramarital flings. He slept with his team-mate Ian Walmsley's (Nathan Constance) young sister-in-law, Marie Minshall (Micaiah Dring), who was Jason's biggest fan. He considered leaving Tanya for her after several bust-ups, but came to his senses and dumped the girl he used for sex.

In episode one, Jason and Tanya discovered that the club's chairman, Frank Laslett (John Forgeham), had lied to them and secretly signed Italian midfielder Salvatore Biagi (Daniel Schutzmann), whom he planned to replace Jason as captain. Tanya lost her temper and attacked Frank after the event, causing him to hit his head on the side of his car, putting him in a coma. Tanya and Jason fled the scene, leaving Frank for dead, though he was found unconscious the next morning.

Months followed with a terrified guilty Tanya in pieces and spending every day and night in constant fear of Frank waking up. Visiting Frank religiously in hospital in fear of her guilt being made public, Tanya discovered nurse Jeanette Dunkley (Julie Legrand) raping a comatose Frank. In exchange for her silence, Jeanette agreed to convince Frank's ex-wife and son that Frank would never recover and it would be best to turn off the life-support machine. As everyone gathered to say goodbye to him, Tanya was stunned when Frank's hand twitched and he opened his eyes. Luckily for her, he remembered nothing about the incident that nearly cost his life and she had told Janette that they were having an affair which throw him off guard when Janette told him that she knew as he had no recollection of this either. She then paid Jeanette to disappear. This also gave her the chance to get Frank to reinstate Jason as team captain, although he lost it to Ian after some bad performances.

After begging for Tanya's forgiveness for being a useless husband, Jason got back up to his old tricks and seduced Jackie Pascoe (Gillian Taylforth), mother of his teammate Kyle (Gary Lucy), who was about twice his age. She fell pregnant but an uninterested Jason told her to abort the baby, however she couldn't bring herself to do so (unknown to Jason), and when her daughter-in-law, Chardonnay (Susie Amy), discovered that she wasn't pregnant as previously believed, she decided to take on Jackie's child as her own to avoid humiliation.

Whilst Tanya led Frank to believe he was in a secret relationship with her, Jason stormed in and started shouting, which brought back Frank's chilling memories of the night of his "accident".

=== Series Two ===
Series 2 began with Tanya and her husband Jason in court, accused of Frank's attempted murder, but she lied her way out of it and there was no evidence as the nurse, Jeanette, has "vanished" into thin air. In the end, it was her word against Frank's and the case collapsed but Frank was determined to get his revenge.

Furthermore, the Pascoes came home after Jackie secretly gave birth to Jason's son, Patrick "Paddy", in Florida, USA.

Jason noticed Jackie's depressed attitude at a party, celebrating baby Paddy's birth, he was delighted when Kyle and Chardonnay made him and Tanya godparents, and followed Jackie into the house to confront her. After her breast milk leaked, he realised that Paddy was the child he thought she had terminated several months before. He became broody and decided he wanted children after all, and offered to ditch his troublesome marriage to set up home with Paddy and Jackie, who had started to get doubts about giving up the baby after noticing how Chardonnay used the child as a fashion accessory. When Jackie made it clear that she and Jason had no future, he decided to try and persuade Tanya to have children, even though he knew that she would refuse.

As the Turner marriage disintegrated further, Tanya and Jason's agent, Hazel Bailey (Alison Newman), came home from a party drunk, and after snorting cocaine, engaged in lesbian sex. Tanya was horrified and deeply regretted it the next morning as Jason walked through the front door.

Realising that this could be the last chance to save her marriage, Tanya pretended to agree to try for a baby, taking birth control pills in secret. Jason made a grand gesture as godfather by putting a large sum of money in a bank account for Paddy but destroyed the account book when he found out that the Pascoes had thrown Jackie out after they caught her breastfeeding the baby. The police gatecrashed the christening party, after Frank tipped them off about Tanya carrying drugs, and Tanya's handbag was emptied, revealing drugs and some pills. Jason decided to end their marriage once and for all, disgusted, and began divorce proceedings. She was interviewed by Chardonnay on her chat show and branded Jason as impotent, but he hit back by saying that he had fathered a baby.

He decided to sort out the mess once and for all and kidnapped Paddy from the Pascoe home, beating up Kyle when he tried to intervene after he announced he was the child's father. With no legal adoption papers, their case was hopeless and the press, wondering why Paddy hadn't been seen for such a while, questioned their parenting abilities.

However, things changed when Jason cut all ties with baby Paddy after a doctor revealed that he was intersex after a womb and ovaries were found. Jason called his child a freak, and blew a fuse after a magazine was published with him, Chardonnay, Kyle, and Tanya dressed as with the bodies of the opposite sex stuck under their heads to try and show the world that they did not care about Paddy being a hermaphrodite. At this point, new, shy, teenage football player Darius Fry (Peter Ash) was besotted by Tanya, who seduced him on a number of occasions, before making him strip in the sauna and throwing him out of her house naked.

Jason then begged Tanya, who was revolted by her fine and community service at an old people's home cleaning false teeth and toilets due to her drug addiction, to reconcile after admitting to fathering Paddy. She agreed, and was stunned when blast from the past Jeanette turned up at the home. Jeanette blackmailed more cash out of Tanya and joined forces with Frank to prove that she put him in a coma and tried to get Jeanette to finish him off for good.

During a meeting with Tanya, Jeanette who secretly wore a microphone underneath her top linked to Frank's headphones, started talking about how Tanya put Frank in a coma. Tanya, twigging that Jeanette had a plan with Frank, purposely diverted the conversation to Jeanette raping Frank in hospital, while Frank listened in horror. Jeanette knocked a glass of wine down her top and Tanya took this as her chance to finally move on from the incident that almost killed Frank by agreeing to put Jeanette into hiding by dying her hair grey and disguising her as a resident of the old people's home she worked at. Frank, now finally knowing for sure that Tanya almost murdered him, tracked Jeanette down by using her mobile phone signal and told her that she must help him make Tanya pay.

Jason and Tanya were arranging the renewing of their vows, when the philanderer bragged to his team-mates about having slept with the manager, Stefan Hauser (Philip Bretherton), deranged daughter, Freddie (Jessica Brooks). Darius, who was still besotted with Tanya and genuinely believed that he was the right man for her, had a go at Jason in the changing rooms, provoking the angry captain to threaten him. Chardonnay told Tanya that Jason had cheated yet again, and she went through with their renewing of vows right until the moment she was to say "I do", but she threw the ring across the room and told him that their marriage was over for good. Jason responded by punching her, however she told everyone to enjoy the reception. By now Jason was despised, particularly by Tanya, Salvatore, Kyle, Chardonnay, Darius, Frank and Jackie. He was soon informed of his wife's indiscretion with Darius during their separation, and got drunk on the roof of the building. He began to shout at an unseen character (later revealed to be Chardonnay), and fell off the edge of the roof, hanging on by one hand. He begged Chardonnay to help him, but she picked up an empty bottle and whacked it hard on Jason's fingers, causing him to let go of the roof and fall to his death.

=== Series Three ===
The series opened with a funeral, assumed to be Jason's, although it turned out to be Chardonnay's when a glass coffin with her name on in large crystal letters appeared from the back of a funeral car. Her widower, Kyle, bore her secret — she had killed Jason, and then battled with anorexia due to the pressure of her guilt, which eventually led to her death. Jason, however, was ruled in court to have committed suicide.

Events in Tanya's life also took a surprising turn. Despite previously having hated Frank Laslett, who had agreed to drop all charges in favour of their new business arrangement, Tanya, having been left a string of debts by her late husband, Jason, married him in a business settlement. Of course Frank demanded more than just an arrangement, and Tanya began to cringe during sexual encounters with her new husband, and it seemed that Frank's revenge was coming in a different form.

The highly controversial mile high scene between Tanya and Conrad was dubbed "the sexiest ever scene on British television" by The Mirror

Tanya, meanwhile, began an affair with new signing, Conrad Gates, a bisexual who had always shared an open relationship with Bollywood star wife, Amber. It became clear to an extremely jealous Amber, who loathed Tanya, that the fling she urged her husband to end was becoming more serious. Tanya discovered that Conrad was also hooking up with his closeted gay teammate, Noah, and after Conrad dumped him, she set him up with a rent boy and had the whole scene filmed and shown to the world to make sure he didn't get involved with Conrad again.

Amber was then abducted and Conrad decided to cool his affair with Tanya, but she exposed Amber as a liar and that the kidnapping incident was set up to make Conrad finish with Tanya. The disgusted team captain decided to leave Amber and move in with Tanya after she watched Frank die of a heart attack after realising that rampant sex wasn't good for his dodgy heart.

Life became tough for Conrad and Tanya when Amber began stalking them, going as far as attempting to hang herself outside their front door. She found out that she was pregnant, and Conrad asked her to move in with him and Tanya so he could keep a watchful eye on her. Not long after, Tanya was revealed to be pregnant, and was devastated when a video of Frank was delivered to her by his lawyer, Mr Davis who said that frank had asked him to deliver it to her on receiving "such happy news". In the video Frank told Tanya that "latex is so fragile and you were always so vigorous with me", thus his condoms were very weak. Tanya got one of the remaining condoms from Frank's old drawer and filled it with water, only for the liquid to come shooting out of mini holes. She realised that Frank had been doing this all along and the unborn child could be his. After a row about Tanya having a baby and moving in with Conrad, Amber planted cocaine in Tanya's handbag.

=== Bad Girls: Series Six ===
Tanya at HMP Larkhall Prison on Bad Girls

Tanya was sentenced to 5 years for possession of cocaine and sent to HMP Larkhall. This was her second offence, she was previously arrested for being in possession and sentenced to community service. However, this time, Tanya is innocent, the cocaine was planted in her handbag by her nemesis, Amber Gates.

Tanya did a deal with gangster Rik Revoir – if she discovered the whereabouts of a stolen bag from its thief, fellow inmate Darlene Cake, he would arrange for someone to confess to planting the drugs on her. However, when Rik kidnapped Darlene's younger brother Terence and sent one of his severed toes into Larkhall, Tanya quickly realised that she was in over her head. But Rik was the least of her worries, because of the luxury hamper that was delivered shortly after her arrival on the wing, Tanya was considered by the police to be the prime suspect in the mass oxalic poisonings that resulted in Al McKenzie's death. But then luckily, the discovery of a stash of rhubarb hooch in the servery put her in the clear. Tanya conspired with Wing Governor Frances Myers to double-cross Rik. In exchange for leniency, Rik confessed to planting the cocaine in Tanya's handbag and she was released on bail pending an appeal.

=== Series Four ===
Amber is living with Conrad and Tanya and both women are getting on each other's tits, meanwhile Tanya is secretly worried about giving birth to Frank's baby, so with none other than former acquaintance Jeanette Dunkley's help, she drugs Amber to make her waters brake. As soon as Amber's waters broke, Tanya demanded a Cesarean section immediately while Conrad was in Spain. Certain she was carrying Frank's baby, she ordered Dunkley to swap the babies at birth, so if Amber's accusations of Tanya cheating and having a child with someone else went as far as paternity tests, the story wouldn't match since 'her' child would have Conrad's DNA.

The truth eventually came out when, Pundarik, (Tanya's biological son) was smothered to death by Amber's pet dog, Krishna. Postmortem results revealed that the baby had been wearing fake tan at the time of his death. Amber eventually realised what Tanya had done and ambushed the christening of Tanya's (biologically her) baby, Troy where she tried to convince Conrad of Tanya's guilt in swapping the babies, he initially he refused to believe her so she left the christening and headed to Pundarik's grave where she started digging him up with an ice bucket, once Conrad arrived he stopped her, telling her that she was digging up her own baby's grave and that Pundarik was gone and she can't get him back, but she refused to believe this and said "my baby is alive and living in your house", Conrad begged her not to do this but she insisted on a maturnity test but said that if it proved that Tanya was Troy's mother they would never hear from her again. Following the results proving Troy's real parentage, Conrad attacked Tanya, attempting to strangle her only to be stopped by Amber and then broke off their engagement, and Tanya left the show in episode four of series four in a helicopter. At the end of that episode, she was seen on a beach in Rio de Janeiro chatting up a fat, old, Brazilian millionaire, which obviously hinted to the viewers what Tanya would've been getting up to in Brazil.

Later in the series, Conrad and Amber claimed custody of their son, Troy, now renamed Phoenix, but their joy was cut short when Conrad was accidentally shot dead by teammate Bruno Milligan when he mistook him for Giles Arrowsmith, the man who kidnapped Lucy and Angelica.

=== Series Five ===
Tanya returned to the show in episode four. In typical Tanya fashion. In an airport talking to the ticket lady.

- Lady: Are you travelling alone Mrs. Frederico?
- Tanya: Correcto, one widow, one dead husband (shows the urn)
- Lady: Window seat?
- Tanya: I don't care where I'm sat as long as the champagne's on ice.
- Lady: The flight departs in just under an hour. Departing from gate 3.
- Tanya: Thank you (walks off)
- Lady: Excuse me, madam, haven't you forgotten something? (points to the urn).
- Tanya: Tell you what, darling. You keep it. I won't be needing that where I'm heading.

In the next episode, Tanya is getting on a plane when she sees new Earl's Park signing, Paulo Bardosa. She bribes the air hostess to let her sit next to him and he mistakes her for a giddy fan and is surprised when Tanya reveals she is a shareholder in Earl's Park. The plane runs into turbulence and Paulo comforts her during it. It becomes clear there is a very strong attraction between them. After landing in England, she is horrified to find that Eva de Wolffe, an old magazine publisher, is actually Paulo's lover, (she thought she was his mother).

They meet again later that night at a restaurant and Eva gets Tanya's best seat and Eva makes bitchy remarks to Tanya, who overhears her bragging about her contract costing £1.5 million to take photos for her magazine at Tremaine Gidigbi and Liberty Baker's wedding so Tanya asks Lucy for an invitation in order to get close to Paulo. After more bitchy remarks from Eva, she sneakily steals her shoes while Paulo massages her feet and pulls off the heels before placing them back where she took them and then edges on Eva for a fight, only for her to approach Tanya and go crashing into the waiter and his tray of drinks and falling to the floor.

The next day, Eva publishes an article showing Tanya eating away and smoking. They continue to feud at Trisha Watson's cancer appeal and they have an auction competition for a dinner with Paulo, but Eva wins (after Tanya continued to raise her bid to sums of cash that became obvious to the people surrounding that it was all just part of a bitter feud between the pair) and gives it to Trisha. At the opera, Tanya follows Paulo and Eva in the opposite box, Eva finds Tanya and Paulo together having sex and demands he comes home. When he refuses to move, Eva says something to him in Portuguese, calling him Marchello, and he just goes with her as though being mesmerised.

At her mansion, Eva goes crazy at Paulo and makes him say sorry. After doing so, an unsatisfied Eva shouts "Sorry what?!", to which Paulo responds "Sorry mama". Tanya realises that something isn't right and searches Eva de Wolffe on the Internet and sees pictures of her in poor countries helping abandoned and orphaned children, and realised that the boy in a picture underneath which read 'Marchello', was actually Paulo, and discovered that Eva had adopted him.

Meanwhile, viewers have seen that when Paulo is 'naughty', Eva handcuffs him and puts him in a cage to bring back the bad memories of the state he was in when Eva first rescued him. Tanya, by now, goes round to Eva's residence and confront her with the fact she was sleeping with her own son. Eva's indifferent words show how ruthless and sick-minded she is, especially since she expected Paulo to love her in more than just a motherly way for the rest of their lives. Tanya lures Paulo towards her, but Eva hits him with a rake and tries to strangle Tanya. She fails and Paulo resists her calls and goes off with Tanya. They move into a new home and have a housewarming party, in which drunken footballer Callum Watson makes a pass at her causing Paulo (who was coming up the stairs and saw this happening) to get a vase and smash up the house and Tanya's expensive sports car, before begging her to punish him in front of all the guests. The next episode revealed that he'd been carted off to a psychiatric unit.

In the final episode of the series, club boss Garry Ryan makes several attempts to sleep with Tanya, although he is gunning for revenge when she makes it clear that she doesn't do old fat sleazeballs anymore. The next morning, she discovers that her dead Brazilian husband's properties and businesses (from which she gets her income) had been frozen as he was suspected to have been involved with fraud, leaving her penniless and unable to afford the rent on the new house. On the advice of her solicitor, she decides to sell her shares in Earl's Park. However, the stock in the company has fallen and she has to persuade Garry to buy them off her (although she had to sleep with him at his request). Because she previously rejected his sexual advances, he gets revenge on her by tricking her into buying some dodgy shares and she now loses all this money.

Tanya then discovers that Garry was linked to club manager Roger Webb's fatal fall down a lift shaft as the dictaphone that was, unknown to Garry, in Roger's pocket at the time of his death recorded their whole conversation (including details of Garry's attempt to rape Roger's wife, Jackie) and indicated that Garry had directed his blind former employee to the broken lift that caused his death, and tries to blackmail him with the dictaphone recording. They then arranged to meet in a Soho nightclub in a back room to sort out a pay off for Tanya to keep quiet, and as Garry offered Tanya a line of cocaine, the camera slid slowly to underneath the bar in the room, and a shot of deadly poison came into view, leaving viewers with an end-of-series cliffhanger, and Tanya in a life or death situation.

=== Finale Spoof, The Last Ever Ever Footballers Wives (Sport Relief 2006) ===
On 15 July 2006 the BBC aired what some people have considered to be the very last episode of Footballers Wives, however the episode is not considered canon to the series and was merely an episode aired to make money for charity. The episode ends with Tanya waking from a bed, claiming the last five series were all a dream. Tanya then blows up her flat in a freak accident when she lights her cigarette, leaving Turner dead. This special was a six-minute, non-canonical spoof, therefore none of its content is considered a tie-up to end the series.

== Relationships ==
Listed below is a full list, in chronological order of the men that Tanya had relationships with:

Jason Turner (1st husband/ deceased) (premise - 2003)
Francis Michael "Frank" Laslett (faux ex-affair (2003)/ 2nd husband/ deceased (2004))
Darius Fry (ex-affair) (2002)
Conrad Gates (ex-affair (2004)/ broken engagement/deceased (2005))
Juan Federico (3rd husband/ deceased) (2005-2006)
Paulo Bardosa (ex-lover) (2006)

Pundarik Apolo Gates (son with Frank Laslett) (deceased) (2004)

Note

- Tanya and her husband Jason plotted for her to have an affair with Frank, in order for Jason to get his job back.
- Tanya was run out of Europe by Conrad Gates & his wife, Amber Gates, following the revelation of Tanya's deceit.
