= 10th National Television Awards =

British awards ceremony in 2004

- Date: 26 October 2004
- Location: Royal Albert Hall, London
- Country: United Kingdom
- Presented by: Various
- Hosted by: Trevor McDonald
- Website: http://www.nationaltvawards.com/

Television/radio coverage
- Network: ITV

The 10th National Television Awards ceremony was held at the Royal Albert Hall on 26 October 2004 and was hosted by Sir Trevor McDonald.

== Awards ==
Category	Winner	Also nominated
Most Popular Actor	David Jason (DI Jack Frost, A Touch of Frost)	Bruno Langley (Todd Grimshaw, Coronation Street); James Nesbitt (Nick Zakian, The Canterbury Tales); Nigel Harman (Dennis Rickman, EastEnders); Shane Richie (Alfie Moon, EastEnders)
Most Popular Actress	Suranne Jones (Karen McDonald, Coronation Street)	Tina O'Brien (Sarah Platt, Coronation Street); Caroline Quentin (Maggie Mee, Life Begins); Jessie Wallace (Kat Slater, EastEnders); Zöe Lucker (Tanya Turner, Footballers' Wives)
Most Popular Drama	The Bill (ITV1)	Bad Girls (ITV1); CSI: Crime Scene Investigation (Channel 5/CBS); Footballers' Wives (ITV1)
Most Popular Serial Drama	Coronation Street (ITV1)	EastEnders (BBC One); Emmerdale (ITV1); Hollyoaks (Channel 4)
Most Popular Entertainment Programme	Ant & Dec's Saturday Night Takeaway (ITV1)	Strictly Come Dancing (BBC One); Friday Night with Jonathan Ross (BBC One); Pop Idol (ITV1/ITV2)
Most Popular Reality Programme	Big Brother (Channel 4)	Hell's Kitchen (ITV1/Fox); I'm a Celebrity... Get Me Out of Here! (ITV1); SAS Desert – Are You Tough Enough? (Channel 4)
Most Popular Entertainment Presenter	Ant & Dec (Ant & Dec's Saturday Night Takeaway)	Davina McCall (Big Brother); Dermot O'Leary (Big Brother's Little Brother); Jonathan Ross (Friday Night with Jonathan Ross)
Most Popular Daytime Programme	This Morning (ITV1)	Neighbours (BBC One/Network Ten); GMTV (ITV); Richard & Judy (Channel 4); Today with Des and Mel (ITV1)
Most Popular Quiz Programme	Who Wants to Be a Millionaire? (ITV1)	A Question of Sport (BBC One); Have I Got News for You (BBC One); The Vault (ITV1)
Most Popular Comedy Programme	Little Britain (BBC Three)	Friends (Channel 4/NBC); Last of the Summer Wine (BBC One); My Family (BBC One)
Most Popular Factual Programme	Wife Swap (Channel 4)	Crimewatch UK (BBC One); Ramsay's Kitchen Nightmares (Channel 4); Top Gear (BBC Two)
Most Popular Newcomer	Sam Aston (Coronation Street)	Honeysuckle Weeks (Foyle's War); Patsy Kensit (Emmerdale); Tracy-Ann Oberman (EastEnders)
Most Popular Sporting Moment	Jonny Wilkinson wins the Rugby World Cup	
Special Recognition Award	Caroline Quentin	
