= Footballers' Wives: Extra Time =

Television series

- Opening credits title
- Also known as: Footballers' Wives: Overtime
- Created by: Maureen Chadwick; Ann McManus
- Starring: Courtney Akers; Nicholas Ball; Marc Bannerman; Sarah Barrand; Frances Da Costa; Jamie Davis; Elaine Glover; Marc Hendrey; Helen Latham; Julie Legrand; Sarah Matravers; Georgina Mellor; Dominique Moore; Travis Oliver; Louise Plowright; Ben Richards; Laila Rouass; Tom Swire
- Country of origin: United Kingdom
- No. of series: 2
- No. of episodes: 25

Production
- Executive producer: Cameron Roach
- Producer: Di Burrows
- Running time: 20–25 Mins
- Production company: Shed Productions

Original release
- Network: ITV2
- Release: 26 May 2005 – 18 May 2006

Related
- Footballers' Wives

Footballers' Wives: Extra Time (stylised as footballers wive$: extra time) is a British drama programme. A spin-off of Footballers' Wives, the programme aired on ITV2 for two series. Footballers' Wives: Extra Time aired in the United States on BBC America under the title Footballers' Wives: Overtime.

== Background ==
Footballers' Wives: Extra Time was the spin-off to the award-winning original series Footballers' Wives. Picking up from the end of Footballers' Wives Series 4, it aired on ITV2.

== Episodes ==
With success of the first series, ITV2 increased the episode lengths by 10 minutes and ordered one more episode than the first series.

Series	Number of episodes	Length of episodes (no breaks)	Length of episodes (with breaks)
1	12	20 minutes	30 minutes
2	13	30 minutes	45 minutes

The original episode line-up of series two consisted of 18 episodes at 20–25 minutes each. However, there is no explanation as to why the 18 episodes were put into 13 extended episodes for airing.

Both series aired on Thursdays at 10:00 pm, though for some episodes the time varied.

== Cast ==
- Georgina Mellor as Anika Beevor (Series 1-2)
- Travis Oliver as Oliver Ryan (Series 1-2)
- Frances Da Costa as Yasmin Salter (Series 1-2)
- Marc Hendrey as Rees Salter (Series 1-2)
- Sarah Matravers as Joly Salter (Series 1-2)
- Tom Swire as Seb Webb (Series 1-2)
- Dominique Moore as Channel O'Grady (Series 1-2)
- Jack Pierce as Cash Brown (Series 1-2)
- Ben Richards as Bruno Milligan (Series 1-2)
- Helen Latham as Lucy Milligan (Series 1-2)
- Nicholas Ball as Gary Ryan (series 1-2; crossed over to series 5 of Footballers' Wives)
- Peter Ash as Darius Fry (Series 2)
- Julie Legrand as Janette Dunkley (Series 2)
- Louise Plowright as Michelle Thorn (Series 1)
- Alice Bird as Lizzy Robinson (Series 2)
- Ross Finbow as Woody (Series 2)
- Marc Bannerman as Matt Bryant (Series 1-2)

=== Special guest stars ===
- Sarah Barrand as Shannon Lawson (Series 1-2)
- Laila Rouass as Amber Gates (Series 1)
- Jamie Davis as Harley Lawson (Series 1)
- Elaine Glover as Katie Jones (Series 1)
- Craig Gallivan as Callum Watson (Series 2)
- Angela Ridgeon as Trisha Watson (Series 2)
- Courtney Akers as Angelica Milligan (Series 1-2)

== Connected characters ==
These characters are connected to characters from the main series, Footballers' Wives.

Character	Relation
Anika Beevor	Tanya Turner's half-sister
Oliver Ryan	Gary Ryan's son
Yasmin Salter	Bruno Milligan's daughter
Rees Salter	Bruno Milligan's son
Joly Salter	Bruno Milligan's ex-wife
Seb Webb	Roger Webb's son

== DVD releases ==
Acorn Media announced that they will release both series of Footballers Wives: Extra Time with the Footballers Wives: Complete Collection box set in August 2012.

The Complete First Series
Set Details			Special Features
12 Episodes; 2-Disc Set; 16:9 Anamorphic Aspect Ratio; Subtitles: English; English (Stereo)			This set contains no special features.
Release dates			This set contains no special features.
United Kingdom	Australia	United States	This set contains no special features.
3 July 2006	10 July 2006	TBC	This set contains no special features.

Footballers' Wives Extra Time - Series 1 & 2
Set Details	Special Features
30 Episodes; 4-Disc Set; 16:9 Anamorphic Aspect Ratio; Subtitles: English; English (Dolby Digital)	This set contains no special features.
Release dates	This set contains no special features.
United Kingdom	This set contains no special features.
11 June 2012	This set contains no special features.

The Series 2 release in Australia has the original episode-plan of 18 episodes. However, the release of the Second half boxset has the aired version of 13 extended episodes (30 minutes).

== Foreign audience ==
In the United States, BBC America has aired the first series, although it is known in the US as Footballers Wive$: Overtime. In Israel, the 2 series aired on channel Yes+. In Estonia, the first series was aired on Kanal 2.
