= Susie Amy =

English actress

- Born: 17 April 1981 (age 45); London, England
- Occupations: Actress; model
- Years active: 2000–present
- Partner: Raphael Bar
- Children: 2

Susie Amy (born 17 April 1981) is an English actress and model. She is best known for her role as Chardonnay Lane-Pascoe in the ITV series Footballers' Wives. Amy has also appeared in films Modigliani, La Femme Musketeer, House of 9 and Hollyoaks.

== Acting career ==
While she was working on the Royal National Theatre production of Sharman Macdonald's After Juliet, Amy was spotted by an agent, and soon had her first roles on television. In 2001, she appeared in television series Dark Realm and My Family, and then in the 2002 television film Sirens. In 2001, Amy was cast as Chardonnay Lane-Pascoe in the ITV series Footballers' Wives, which made her a household name and earned her the New TV Talent Award by the Television and Radio Industries Club. She was voted as number 74 on the FHM list of 100 Sexiest Women in the World in 2002, and as number 63 in 2003. Along with Katherine Monaghan and Zöe Lucker, Amy appeared on the FHM cover for February 2003. She starred in Footballers' Wives from 2002 to 2003.

In 2004, Amy was chosen for the lead role of Valentine D'Artagnan in the Hallmark Channel film La Femme Musketeer, starring alongside Michael York, Gérard Depardieu and Nastassja Kinski. For the role she had to train in martial arts, fencing and horse riding, which she is said to have loved. The same year, she portrayed Beatrice Hastings in Modigliani, which starred Andy García. In 2005, Amy appeared in films House of 9, starring Dennis Hopper, and Dead Fish, and worked on Bill Kenwright's stage production of Wait Until Dark.

Amy had episode roles in television series Hotel Babylon, The Royal and Doctors in 2006. In 2007, she filmed motion picture Two Families, appeared in the BBC series New Street Law, and portrayed Lindsey Gordon in the three episodes of Coronation Street. Amy then acted in the 2008 series Echo Beach, which was cancelled after twelve episodes. Her most recent projects include films Lesbian Vampire Killers (2009), Psych 9 (2010), Pimp (2010) and Bonded by Blood (2010), and a stage production of Agatha Christie's Murder on the Nile (2012). In 2018, she portrayed the role of Scarlett Morgan on the Channel 4 soap opera Hollyoaks. She returned to the role in 2022.

== Other work ==
Amy was a judge in Dancing on Ice: The Tour at the Hallam FM Arena in Sheffield. In 2010, she participated in the outdoor series 71 Degrees North, a challenge show set in Norway. Challenges included under-ice swimming and living in conditions up to −30 degrees. She came the third the series, losing out to Gavin Henson and Marcus Patrick in the final. On 22 December 2010, Amy appeared in Celebrity Come Dine with me Christmas Special, competing against actor and musician Goldie, singer Tony Christie, and former Blue Peter presenter Janet Ellis for a prize of £1,000, which went to charity. She came joint second with Christie, behind winner Ellis.

In September 2011, Amy started a beauty and lifestyle blog www.blusherandblogging.com. She is a brand ambassador for British skincare line 'ARK Skincare'.

Amy was a semi-regular panellist on the topical discussion series The Wright Stuff on Channel 5.

== Filmography ==
Year	Title	Role	Notes
2001	Dark Realm	Girl	Episode: "She's the One"
2001	My Family	Donna	Episode: "Trust Never Sleeps"
2002	Sirens	Helen Grey	
2002–2003	Footballers' Wives	Chardonnay Lane-Pascoe	Regular role, 17 episodes
2004	Modigliani	Beatrice Hastings	
2004	La Femme Musketeer	Valentine D'Artagnan	
2004	House of 9	Claire Levy	
2005	Dead Fish	Hostess	
2006	Hotel Babylon	Alice	1 episode
2006	The Royal	Debbie Guthrie	Episode: "Thinking Too Hard"
2006	Doctors	Megan Reeves	Episode: "Running Time"
2007	Two Families	Giulia	
2007	New Street Law	Tessa Darling	
2007	Coronation Street	Lindsey Gordon	3 episodes
2008	Echo Beach	Angela Cole	12 episodes
2009	Plus One	Nicola Dare	Episode: "I Do a Lot of Work for Charity"
2009	Lesbian Vampire Killers	Blonde	
2010	Psych 9	Anne Marks	
2010	Pimp	Tammy	
2010	Bonded by Blood	Donna Jagger	
2012	Love Like Hers	Mother	
2015	Silent Hours	Rosemary Calthorpe	
2016	Doctors	Jules Moule	Episode: "Without You"
2016	Death in Paradise	Ella Thomas	Episode: "Lost Identity"
2017	Casualty	Susan Beckett	1 episode
2018, 2022	Hollyoaks	Scarlett Morgan	Recurring role
2018	Holby City	Susan Beckett	1 episode

== Awards and nominations ==
Year	Award	Category	Nominated work	Result
2003	Television and Radio Industries Club Award	New TV Talent	Footballers' Wives	Won
