= Ridgeon =

Ridgeon is a surname. Notable people with the surname include:

- Angela Ridgeon, British actress
- Jon Ridgeon (born 1967), English hurdler
