= Sarah Barrand =

English actress

- Born: 2 November 1985 (age 40); Southport, Merseyside, England, UK
- Occupations: Actress, television and radio presenter
- Years active: 2004–present
- Website: https://www.instagram.com/sarahbarrand1/

Sarah Barrand (born 2 November 1985) is an English actress known for her role as Shannon Donnelly-Lawson in Footballers Wives and its ITV2 spin-off, Footballers' Wives: Extra Time. Barrand grew up in Southport, Merseyside.

She has played other roles on dramas such as Casualty, and in the films Stag Night, Caught in the Act, and The Kid. Sarah presented a two-part documentary for ITV, Date with the Dalai, with Footballers Wives co-star, Zöe Lucker. In addition to acting and presenting, Sarah is a voice over artist for numerous television, video games and radio broadcasts.

== Personal life ==
The MTV GB2B Cup was presented by Sarah, and she is a Celebrity Ambassador for WellChild.

She is a supporter of Liverpool F.C.

Barrand was in a relationship with Elyes Gabel.
