= Kim Taylforth =

English actress

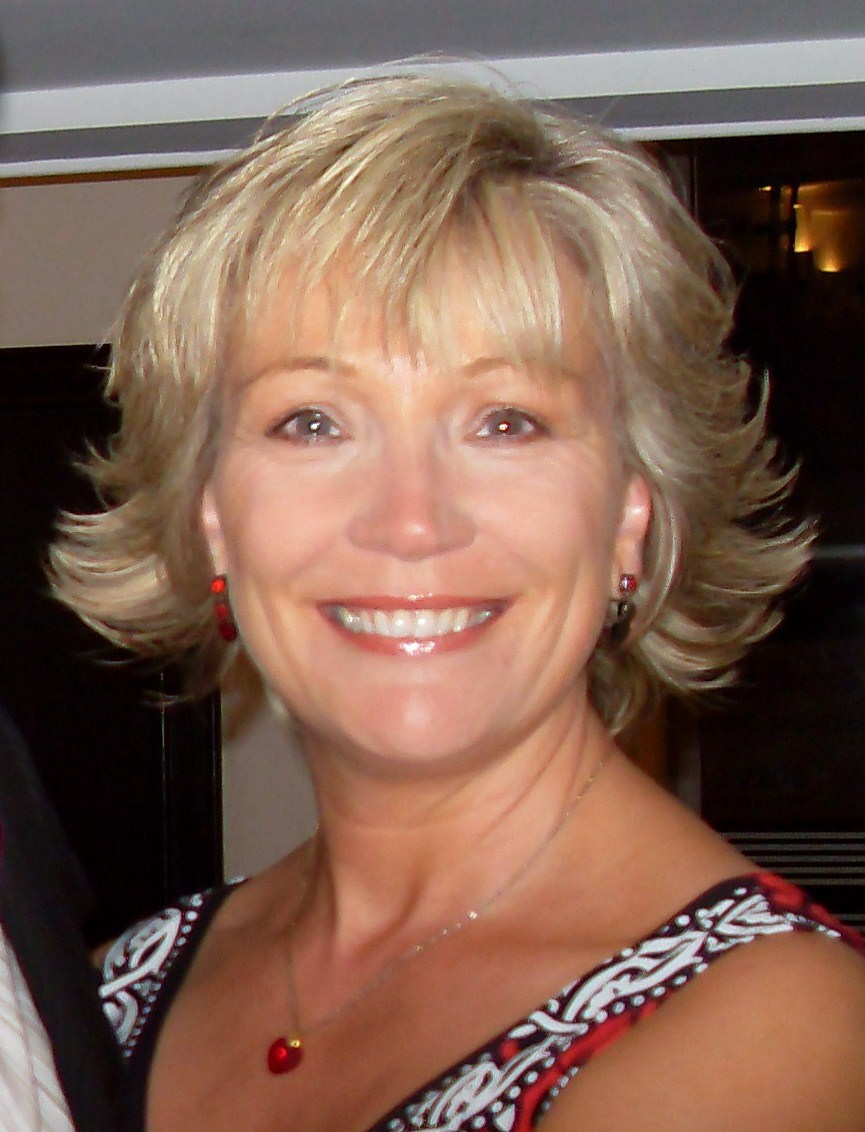
- Occupation: Actress
- Children: 2
- Relatives: Gillian Taylforth (sister)

Kim Taylforth is an English actress. She is the sister of EastEnders actress Gillian Taylforth.

She trained in acting at the Anna Scher Theatre School in Islington. Her earliest TV appearance was in the BBC sitcom, Steptoe and Son, when she was 15 years old. Aged 19, she starred as 'Janet' in the 1979 TV film The Knowledge about a group of aspiring Londoners learning The Knowledge with Mick Ford and Nigel Hawthorne. She also appeared in Never the Twain as Shirley. She appeared with her sister Gillian, in 1982, on the children's TV show On Safari and in the 1983 Minder episode "Senior Citizen Caine". She took a break from acting to pursue a career in the Metropolitan Police from 1984 to 1996.

Taylforth also appeared as Billy Ray's mother in London's Burning.

She returned to acting and appeared in the first series of Operation Good Guys in 1997.

She is best known for her roles as Sharon Ingram on the Five soap opera Family Affairs (2004–2005) and as Marilyn Fenner on ITV's Bad Girls.

In December 2011, Taylforth appeared as the Forest Fairy in the production of Babes in the Wood at the Pomegranate Theatre in Chesterfield. In 2012, she appeared on stage with her sister Gillian in a production of a musical comedy, Girls' Night.

In April 2017, Taylforth appeared as Aunt Christine, in Channel 4 soap opera Hollyoaks, as the sister of Sandy Roscoe, played by real life sister Gillian.

She has two sons.
