= Finbow =

Finbow is a surname. Notable people with the surname include:

- David Finbow (born 1968), British snooker player
- Peter Finbow (born 1975), British wheelchair basketball player
- Ross Finbow (born 1982), British film and TV actor
