= List of Footballers' Wives episodes =

Footballers' Wives (stylised as footballers wive$) is a British television drama surrounding the fictional Premier League football club Earls Park F.C., its players, and their wives. It was broadcast on the ITV network from 8 January 2002 to 14 April 2006. The show initially focuses on three very different couples, but from the third series onward it revolves around a complex love triangle between Tanya Turner (Zöe Lucker), Amber Gates (Laila Rouass), and Conrad Gates (Ben Price).

The first and second series each include eight episodes. The third comprises nine episodes, one of which is 90 minutes long. The fourth series also comprises nine episodes, two of which are 90 minutes long. The fifth and final series includes eight episodes, and the series premiere and finale are 90 minutes long. Typical episodes have a running time of approximately 45 minutes.

== Series overview ==
Series	Episodes	Originally released	
Series	Episodes	First released	Last released
1	8	8 January 2002	26 February 2002
2	8	8 January 2003	26 February 2003
3	9	11 February 2004	7 April 2004
4	9	31 March 2005	26 May 2005
5	8	23 February 2006	14 April 2006
Sport Relief special		15 July 2006	

== Episodes ==
=== Series 1 (2002) ===
No.	Title	Directed by	Written by	Original release date	UK viewers (millions)
1	"Getting a Result"	Mike Adams	Ann McManus & Maureen Chadwick	8 January 2002	6.49
Striker Ian Walmsley is thrilled when he gets offered a place on the Earls Park first team. Meanwhile, his young wife Donna starts a search for the son she and Ian gave up for adoption nine years ago. Donna's wild-child sister, Marie, arrives from Bolton and immediately scores with the player she's had a crush on for years—the Sparks' charismatic captain, Jason Turner, they soon have sex in a nightclub toilet. Famous glamour model Chardonnay Lane and Earls Park FC's resident heartthrob Kyle Pascoe are looking forward to their wedding, despite the interference from Kyle's doting mother, Jackie. Jason and his wife Tanya worry about their future when Earls Park announce a new signing—Italian midfielder Salvatore Biagi, a serious threat to Jason's first team place. At the start-of-season party, a violent row breaks out between the Turners and the club chairman, Frank Laslett, and the consequences could be terrible.
2	"Take Each Game as it Comes"	Mike Adams	Ann McManus & Maureen Chadwick	15 January 2002	5.53
The Turners panic when they are told that Frank, who remains in a coma, could recover. Ian doesn't want to know when Donna meets the child they gave up for adoption ten years ago. Tanya catches Jason enjoying time with Marie, and learns that Marie was only showing an interest in Salvatore Biagi to make Jason jealous. Kyle's stag night is as lively as ever; Ian is photographed having sex with two lap-dancers. Chardonnay's hen night goes up in smoke when a couple of drunken fans turn aggressive and cause a terrible accident—will her wedding now take place?
3	"On the Ball"	Paul Duane	Liz Lake	22 January 2002	5.59
Kyle and Chardonnay's wedding day arrives, complete with a glossy magazine deal, despite Chardonnay's injuries, but her happiness pales when she learns that the men who caused her burns will not be charged. The adoptive mother of Ian and Donna's son, Daniel, arrives at the reception, distraught, to tell them he is missing. Ian panics when the news about his secret son hits the headlines, but Sparks' manager Stefan Hauser arranges for the club to assign a lawyer to start a custody battle on Ian and Donna's behalf. Tanya starts to have nightmares about Frank, who is still in a coma, but Jason is distracted by Marie for the night. Donna is horrified when the Walmsleys' private lives make the papers yet again—this time, it's Ian's exploits with a couple of lap-dancers at Kyle's stag night.
4	"A Funny Old Game"	Paul Duane	Liz Lake	29 January 2002	5.20
Tanya turns to cocaine to calm her nightmares and her habit soon gets out of hand. Donna vows to fight for custody of Daniel alone and throws Ian out of the family home, but soon finds out it'll be virtually impossible without his lawyers on her side. Ian finds that he is staying at the same hotel as his Italian teammate Sal, and the two become friends. Newlywed Chardonnay takes a pair of scissors to her long hair when she gets depressed about her burns—Kyle is concerned but Jackie is less sympathetic. Jason tells Tanya that their marriage is over, but Tanya has other ideas and blackmails him into staying. Tanya befriends Frank's intensive care nurse, Jeanette Dunkley, so that she can keep tabs on his condition, explaining her interest by claiming that they had an affair, but Jeanette has very dubious motives of her own, and Tanya knows it.
5	"All To Play For"	Laurence Moody	Phil Ford	5 February 2002	5.42
Ian moves back home and invites Sal along—at Stefan's request but to Donna's annoyance. Tanya promises not to tell anyone of Jeanette's exploits if she persuades Frank's ex-wife and son to switch off Frank's life support, but just as they're about to pull the plug, they get a nasty surprise. Jason is stopped by the police after he tries to force Sal's car off the road. Stefan makes it clear to Jason that he's on his last warning but persuades Sal to cover for his captain. Chardonnay sells the story of her ordeal to a newspaper hoping to shame her attackers, but the article does not turn out as she expected. Kyle, furious to see their private lives all over the tabloids, spends an evening out flirting.
6	"Winning The Double"	Laurence Moody	Jaden Clark	12 February 2002	5.89
Jason demands to be put on the transfer list when Stefan decides to put him on the bench in favour of Sal; bored and lonely after being dropped from the team, he finds comfort in Jackie's arms. Chardonnay arranges a romantic break for herself and Kyle to aid their relationship. Kyle's obsessed fan, Sheena, hangs around the training ground, hoping to meet him again. Marie attempts to seduce Sal but is convinced that he's gay when he rejects her advances. Frank is slowly recovering, but has short-term memory loss and can't remember the night of the attack. Jeanette "reminds" Frank of the affair that Tanya invented, but can Tanya keep lying?
7	"All Credit to the Lads"	Julie Edwards	Jaden Clark	19 February 2002	5.95
When Chardonnay faints at the gym, blood tests reveal that she is pregnant... or is she? After announcing their news to the press, Kyle's pride turns to horror: the test results were Jackie's. Kyle is actually about to become a brother instead of a father. Not wanting to be a single mother, Jackie suggests that Chardonnay and Kyle adopt the child. Ian is made vice-captain but humiliates himself in his first match by getting sent off. Donna finds herself having a passionate encounter with Sal when she becomes irritated by Ian's obsession with his career. Kyle tells Sheena where his loyalties lie. Jason hooks up with a new top agent, Hazel Bailey. Frank, persuaded by Tanya, has Jason reinstated in the team. Tanya has sex with Frank and he starts to have flashbacks about Jeanette.
8	"They Think It's All Over"	Julie Edwards	Helen Childs	26 February 2002	6.21
Chardonnay and Jackie persuade Kyle that the best thing for everyone would be for them to adopt Jackie's baby. Kyle has other things on his mind; Sheena won't take no for an answer. Annoyed at Tanya for flirting with Frank, Jason gets Marie into bed and promises to leave Tanya to be with her. Sal tells Donna he loves her. Holly is kidnapped when Marie is late picking her up from school—Sal uses his transfer fee to pay the ransom but Donna's distraught when Holly never appears at the arranged meeting point. Jason's new agent, Hazel, cooks up a plan to get Tanya out of her "affair" with Frank whilst protecting Jason's position with the team. She arranges for Jason to "catch" Tanya and Frank together, but Jason loses his temper, which for Frank, brings back chilling memories of the night of his "accident".

=== Series 2 (2003) ===
No.	Title	Directed by	Written by	Original release date	UK viewers (millions)
9	"Just Can't Give Up"	Julie Edwards	Liz Lake	8 January 2003	7.19
Five months have passed since the conclusion of Series 1. Five months of hell for Donna and Ian, whose daughter Holly is still missing. Tanya and Frank are in court, but not because of Tanya's attack on Frank, but because she claims he tried to rape her. Jackie has had her baby in a Florida clinic and is unhappily claiming that the baby is Kyle and Chardonnay's. Jason becomes suspicious about baby Paddy's true parentage, especially when he catches Jackie leaking milk. Tanya withdraws her allegations against Frank but nothing happens because she convinces the court that he had mental problems. Ian faces being dropped from the team—especially when he abruptly rushed out on a game to follow a postman with a lead on his daughter's whereabouts.
10	"The Ties That Bind"	Julie Edwards	Helen Childs	15 January 2003	6.93
Ian and Donna are overjoyed to have Holly home, but not so delighted when Stefan tells them that Ian will be put on the transfer list. Jason chats with Jackie about the baby, whom he now knows is his. Kyle is questioned by the police, Chardonnay, and the press about the body in the pool—did he have an affair? After some good work by Hazel, it emerges that he didn't and he receives a full apology. Chardonnay catches Jackie breastfeeding Paddy. After a night drinking with Hazel, Tanya wakes up in bed next to her.
11	"Go For the Overkill"	David Holroyd	Ann McManus & Maureen Chadwick	22 January 2003	6.96
Jackie begins to search for a new home. Jason wants to have a baby, but Tanya doesn't. Tanya's cocaine habit is exposed to the public when she is arrested for possessing drugs. Ian is devastated to learn that Donna has been having an affair with Sal, so leaves to stay in a hotel, where he attempts suicide with a cocktail of drink and drugs. The Pascoes christen their son and are surprised at the gift they receive from the Turners.
12	"...And In With the New"	David Holroyd	Liz Lake	29 January 2003	6.75
Ian tells Frank he declines his contract and leaves Earls Park FC for good. Jason and Jackie are determined to get back baby Paddy but differ in their planned tactics. Tanya is determined to "win" her argument with Jason and decides to sleep with Darius Fry, the team's new 17-year-old recruit. Sal and Donna are surprised at how well Ian is taking the break-up. Tanya says on live television that Jason is an impotent alcoholic and struggles to get an erection. While Donna has second thoughts about her new life with Sal, Jason snatches Paddy from the Pascoes.
13	"A Change of Career?"	Craig Lines	Liz Lake	5 February 2003	7.44
Depressed and lonely after discovering that Donna has gone back to Ian, Sal falls into the arms of Stefan's deranged daughter, Freddie. Tanya worms her way back into the marital home, but Jason treats her badly. Tanya's due in court for drugs offences—will she be sent to prison? Jason manages to talk his way out of trouble with the Pascoes and persuades Kyle to let Jackie keep Paddy. Tanya has another encounter with Darius. Jackie and Jason try to decide what to do about Paddy when he develops a fever.
14	"Facing the Truth"	Craig Lines	Jaden Clark	12 February 2003	6.81
Jason and Jackie learn that surgery isn't an option for Paddy, so they must wait to see how the situation unfolds. Jason nearly catches Tanya with Darius again, then confides his terrible secret to her. Hazel tells the Pascoes that they need to be seen with Paddy to stop the suspicions of the press. Later, at Sal's house, a drunken Freddie pesters Hazel and Sal for a threesome. Jason and Tanya decide to give their marriage another go. Archie, Stefan's right-hand man, pesters Freddie for a date. Tanya bribes the matron, then hires a double to do her community service—then she receives a nasty surprise in the form of Nurse Jeanette Dunkley...the only person who knows the truth about what happened with Frank.
15	"Bitter Medicine"	Laurence Moody	Jaden Clark	19 February 2003	5.91
Kyle finally loses his temper and teaches Jason a lesson he won't forget. Darius tells Tanya how he feels, but doesn’t get the reaction he expected. Jason thrills Tanya by telling her that he wants them to renew their wedding vows, but then gets cozy with Freddie who is trying to make Sal jealous. The Pascoes hold a press conference to raise awareness of Paddy's condition. Jeanette's collaboration with Frank, using a hidden microphone, goes drastically wrong when Tanya says too much during their meal, but will Frank get the information he needs?
16	"Fall From Grace"	Laurence Moody	Liz Lake	26 February 2003	6.72
Freddie tries to make Sal jealous by going on a date with Jason. Kyle and Chardonnay try to make peace with Jason, but he refuses to cooperate, horrifying Jackie with his loathing for Paddy. Tanya is busy planning her vow renewal ceremony, but unplanned arguments ruin the occasion. Jackie packs her bags and leaves with Paddy. A secret from Freddie's past with Archie is revealed. A drunken Jason falls from a roof, but an unknown assailant ensures the job is done. Is he dead? Who is responsible?

=== Series 3 (2004) ===
No.	Title	Directed by	Written by	Original release date	UK viewers (millions)
17	"Episode One"	Jim Loach	Liz Lake	11 February 2004	6.85
The deaths of Jason and Chardonnay hit Kyle hard. Three new players have been signed: Noah Alexander; northern wiz-kid Harley Lawson; and international striker Conrad Gates. Tanya marries Frank Laslett but is soon smitten by bisexual adventurer Conrad. Jackie dates new manager Roger Webb, much to Kyle's disgust. Tanya and Conrad become acquainted, and Jason's murderer is revealed.
18	"Episode Two"	Jim Loach	Liz Lake	18 February 2004	5.77
Amber and Conrad find themselves at the mercy of a Triad gang demanding a huge sum of money. Harley's girlfriend Shannon joins him in London, but soon finds her face doesn't fit and visits a plastic surgeon. Discovering that Frank is broke, Tanya sets her sights on Conrad, which results in a cat fight with Amber. Kyle seeks solace in gambling dens.
19	"Episode Three"	Laurence Moody	Liz Lake	25 February 2004	6.72
As Kyle lies in agony, his future in the Premier League is also in doubt. Shannon is pleased with her nose job and turns her attention to her weight. Hazel wants to take over the club. Amber attempts to revive her flagging film career. Frank lays his future on the line with Tanya, who is more concerned about snatching Conrad from Amber.
20	"Episode Four"	Roberto Bangura	Guy Picot	3 March 2004	7.14
Harley and Shannon prepare for their wedding, with coverage from 'Hello!' magazine and Jordan as special guest. Hazel takes charge at the club and makes her mark, reinstating Elaine as Kyle's physiotherapist. Tanya stumbles across a perfect plan to get rid of Frank.
21	"Episode Five"	Roberton Bangura	Harriet Warner	10 March 2004	6.67
Harley and Shannon wake up the morning after their wedding looking into the jaws of a 400-pound man-eating lion; Conrad receives a ransom demand for Amber, who has been kidnapped; and Frank appears to have a new lease of life, despite Tanya's scheming.
22	"Episode Six"	Dominic Santana	Liz Lake	17 March 2004	6.61
Frank has never felt fitter, and his renewed energy frustrates Tanya, who hoped he would fade fast under her harsh regime of Viagra and sex—will she succeed? She soon has other matters to occupy her time; her arch-enemy Amber has lied about the abduction and Tanya must prove it to Conrad. Kyle's gambling habit threatens to take over his life. Conrad finds out the truth about Amber, who turns to dark magic for assistance.
23	"Episode Seven"	Dominic Santana	Liz Lake	24 March 2004	6.73
Frank Laslett is dead and buried and Tanya just loves playing the glamorous widow, while living the high life off her hefty inheritance. Kyle wins back Elaine, but now has to break the news to Roger. Amber meets her agent, who has bad news for her, and she takes out her anger on Tanya. Noah's actions land him in trouble with Hazel.
24	"Episode Eight"	Julie Edwards	Liz Lake	31 March 2004	6.28
Kyle's first day back at training looks doubtful when he arrives home bruised after a night of bare-knuckle boxing. Shannon has just had her lips done and Harley starts to despair. Tanya is furious as Amber appears to be winning her way back into Conrad's life...then she discovers that Noah is also a player for Conrad's affections
25	"Episode Nine"	Julie Edwards	Harriet Warner	7 April 2004	7.37
Conrad breaks the news of Amber's pregnancy to Tanya, landing a bitter blow as she is on a quest to secure Conrad for herself. Kyle must deal with the police before stepping onto the pitch for one of the team's biggest games ever, while Noah finds himself on the subs bench. Frank also takes his revenge on Tanya from beyond the grave....

- Note: Following the broadcast of the series finale, a one-hour special in which Zöe Lucker presented some of the most memorable moments from the first three series was broadcast. Behind-the-scenes footage and uncut footage from the show that had not been seen before was also shown.

=== Series 4 (2005) ===
No.	Title	Directed by	Written by	Original release date	UK viewers (millions)
26	"Episode One"	Laurence Moody	Liz Lake	31 March 2005	6.85
Roger takes the players to Spain for a 'bonding session', but will one player's shocking behavior with a girl called Katie cause legal and PR disasters for the entire team? Meanwhile, the wives are having a 'bonding session' of their own. Amber and Tanya give birth, but Tanya hires a face from the past to do her devious work... will Amber get the upper hand? Harley and Shannon reconcile while Noah takes drastic action to 'cure' his homosexuality.
27	"Episode Two"	Richard Signy	Liz Lake	7 April 2005	6.40
It's a sad day for Conrad and Amber as they bury their baby, and Tanya sheds a secret tear for the loss of her son. Tanya and Conrad find a nanny for Troy, but she looks familiar... Will Harley discover her ulterior motive before her scissors are let loose? Roger and Jackie marry. Noah has joined a church group, "The Church of the Found" that promises to cure him of his homosexuality. Shannon offers to host Hazel's birthday party, but her attempts at cooking are a disaster until Antony Worrall Thompson saves the day.
28	"Episode Three"	Richard Signy	Ann McManus & Maureen Chadwick	14 April 2005	6.58
Tanya asks Amber to be godmother of 'her' baby, but is unaware that Amber is out for revenge because she discovered that Pundarik was covered in fake tan when he died. Shannon checks out Harley's story and visits Katie to get the truth about what happened in Spain. On the day of Troy's christening, Amber takes to the podium to drop her bombshell...but who'll believe her? Noah is dating the beautiful Bethany—but is his heart really in this new relationship?
29	"Episode Four"	Roberto Bangura	Liz Lake	21 April 2005	6.53
Will Katie use her harpoon gun as Darius wakes up to find himself at her mercy? Noah is pleased as punch—he's done it with a girl and she's gagging for more! At the opening night of Bruno's new club "Nabakov's Cocoon", Tanya steals the show with her new engagement ring, but when Conrad hears the result of the DNA test, the engagement is called off—What will the repercussions be for Tanya? Roger does the deal on a new player—his son Seb! Hazel is far from amused when she learns that Amber has Tanya's shares, meaning she is now on the board.
30	"Episode Five"	Roberton Bangura	Liz Lake	28 April 2005	6.17
Amber has triumphed by sending Tanya packing – but she's got no interest in a reconciliation with Conrad because she's determined to become a singing star, with help from Peter Andre and a track called 'Bhangra Booty'. Harley isn't happy now that his life with Shannon is the subject of a fly-on-the-wall documentary; gay Noah is struggling with girlfriend Bethany's insatiable desire; Darius is wrecking his life with booze; and Roger's son Seb gets a place in the Earl's Park team.
31	"Episode Six"	S.J. Clarkson	Guy Picot	5 May 2005	6.10
Bruno Milligan is furious when "Nabakov's Cocoon" gets bad publicity in the tabloids; Roger tries to keep an eye on steroid-abusing son Seb and has to make excuses to Hazel; Harley clashes with Shannon whose desire for celebrity is ruining their lives – especially when she adopts a granny, "Mrs Birkeham", to look good on the docusoap; Conrad goes to great lengths to win back Amber; Seb makes a move on step mum Jackie after downing loads of vodka; and Amber is interviewed by Dr Neil Fox about her pop single 'Bhangra Booty – West End Lady'.
32	"Episode Seven"	S.J. Clarkson	Liz Lake	12 May 2005	6.18
Seb looks on as Jackie and Roger argue...what is he planning? Lucy plays a dangerous game by agreeing to meet her Internet friend, Giles Arrowsmith. Hazel is on the warpath when Roger refuses to let Seb play again. Amber tries to beat Hazel at her own game at a board meeting.
33	"Episode Eight"	Roberto Bangura	Guy Picot	19 May 2005	6.06
Roger and Jackie's marriage hits crisis point and Seb is determined to twist the knife further. Bruno is becoming suspicious of Lucy. Noah breaks the news of his engagement to Conrad—there's no turning back now. Amber's record is getting much airplay, but her pop career appears doomed when Conrad is told he's being sold to Madrid. A distraught Jackie spots Roger entering a brothel and seeks comfort in the arms of her stepson.
34	"Episode Nine"	Roberto Bangura	Liz Lake	26 May 2005	5.84
Amber demonstrates that she will sink to any level to gain a bigger stake in Earls Park, thereby keeping Conrad and Phoenix in England...but as ever, Hazel calls her bluff! At the Milligans' shooting party, Hazel shows off her new squeeze—an international tennis pro, Jools. Noah gives in to his sexual urges and visits a sauna. Lucy makes her escape from Bruno into the arms of solid, dependable Giles. But she is heading for imminent disaster as trigger-happy Bruno comes after her—armed. Giles tries to kill himself, Lucy, and Angelica. Bruno is determined to find his missing family.

=== Series 5 (2006) ===
No.	Title	Directed by	Written by	Original release date	UK viewers (millions)
35	"Episode One"	Richard Signy	Helen Childs	23 February 2006	4.88
Amber learns that Bruno may have been responsible for Conrad's death. Lucy learns that Bruno has only just divorced his first wife and leaves him at their "wedding". Darius is injured after crossing Garry. Meanwhile, Tremaine Gidigbi joins the club after being released from jail, but is surprised to find that his girlfriend Liberty Baker's personal assistant Urszula is living with them.
36	"Episode Two"	Richard Signy	Joanne McAndrew	2 March 2006	4.65
While Amber wages psychological torture on Bruno, Shannon finds a new man. It's a frustrating time for Liberty and Urszula as they struggle to find time away from Tremaine. Finally, Darius learns some disturbing news about his future.
37	"Episode Three"	Jim Loach	Liz Lake	9 March 2006	4.25
Liberty and Urzula's relationship hit front-page news, and Tre and Libs go onto Richard and Judy to help their relationship. Callum's mother, Trisha, is unwilling to forgive Shannon. Callum is angry at his mother for ruining his chances with Shannon. Bruno loses his grip on reality and even gets fired as skipper. Jackie gets more than she bargained for when she and Roger attend one of Garry's parties. Meanwhile, sparks fly between Tre and Lucy, and Lucy helps Bruno regain his mind with a revelation about Amber.
38	"Episode Four"	Jim Loach	Susan Wilkins	16 March 2006	4.92
When Bruno finds out that Amber is trying to poison him, he kicks her out but she wants revenge. She dresses up as goddess Kali and goes to Shannon and Callum's housewarming party, with a gun! All hell breaks loose! Meanwhile, recently widowed Tanya Turner returns after Amber is sectioned.
39	"Episode Five"	David Kerr	Helen Childs	23 March 2006	4.38
It is the battle of the bitches as Tanya Turner clashes with ruthless magazine editor Eva de Wolffe. Tanya has her eye on Eva's partner, the mysterious Paulo. Who will win?
40	"Episode Six"	David Kerr	Liz Lake	30 March 2006	4.98
Eva has splashed dreadful photos of Tanya all over her magazine, but Tanya has uncovered a dark secret about Eva and Paulo—the man she wants—and plans blackmail. Callum and Shannon organize a charity auction and Lucy is thrilled that the outfits she created fetched such a high price...but the bidder was Bruno, desperate to win her back. With Urszula gone, Liberty has thrown herself into her marriage, but Tremaine is inexplicably avoiding her.
41	"Episode Seven"	Martin Hutchings	Roxanne Harvey	6 April 2006	4.84
Tanya Turner couldn't be happier: she's won the battle for Paolo! To celebrate, she hosts a Brazilian fiesta. Meanwhile, Jackie confronts Garry about Bruno's promotion but he spikes her drink and tries to rape her. When Callum makes a pass at Tanya, she laughs it off but Paolo's jealous streak soars out of control and he trashes the house. Roger takes a trip to Earls Park and comes across Garry. They fight about what happened to Jackie, and Roger threatens to take his suspicions that Darius was nobbled to the press. Garry takes drastic action and guides Roger to an out-of-order lift. An unaware Roger steps in and plummets to the ground.
42	"Episode Eight"	Martin Hutchings	Liz Lake	14 April 2006	4.12
Roger is laid to rest. Liberty causes controversy which could prove fatal for her. Callum gives Shannon an ultimatum. Tanya comes up with a plan to get her hands on some quick money after her ex-husband's cash is frozen, but when Garry Ryan takes her for a ride, she resolves to exact her revenge with Jackie's help. This was the final episode of the final series.

=== Special (2006) ===
The Sport Relief special aired on Saturday 15 July.

Title	Original release date
Sport Relief special "The Last Ever Ever Footballers' Wives"	15 July 2006
The Sparks' new signing, Brendan Spunk (Graham Norton), arrives and Amber, Tanya, and Shannon all want a piece of him. They and Normski all end up in bed with him at the same time and when Bruno comes in, he threatens to kill them all, seeing as there will be no series six. He tries to shoot them but he misses, so he picks up a can of hair spray and a lighter and the flat room explodes. Then Tanya wakes up and realizes that the past five series were all a dream before lighting up a cigarette at which point the room once again explodes.
