= Helen Latham =

English actress

Helen Latham (born 2 March 1976, in the UK) is a British actress. She is best known for playing Lucy Milligan in series 4 and 5 of the British TV drama Footballers' Wives and in series 1 and 2 of its spin-off Footballers' Wives: Extra Time. She has also appeared in many other popular UK television shows, including The Bill (Christine Weaver), Brookside (Jayne Ferris), Cutting It (Shania Tonks), Dalziel and Pascoe (Sally Craig), Dream Team (Natalie Hocknell) as well as the film Sex Lives of the Potato Men. Starred as Dinah in the roller-skating musical Starlight Express and is a winner of Stars in Their Eyes celebrity special, where she performed Dolly Parton's "9 to 5". Latham now stars in an advert for The Stroke Association posing as a victim of a stroke.

== Personal life ==
She met her husband, the actor Darren Morfitt in 1995 while they were both studying at the Mountview Academy of Theatre Arts in London.
