= Alice Bird =

British actress

Alice Bird is a British actress best known for playing Lizzy in series 2 of the ITV2 drama Footballers' Wives: Extra Time. She also appeared in the film Notes on a Scandal based on the novel of the same name written by Zoë Heller.
