= Supernova (2005 film) =

2005 made-for-television miniseries

- Written by: Steven H. Berman; Don Keith Opper
- Directed by: John Harrison
- Starring: Luke Perry; Tia Carrere; Peter Fonda; Emma Samms; Lance Henriksen
- Original language: English
- No. of episodes: 2

Production
- Editors: Miriam Kim; Thomas A. Krueger
- Running time: 172 minutes

Original release
- Network: Hallmark Entertainment
- Release: September 5, 2005

Supernova is a 2005 television miniseries directed by John Harrison and featuring an ensemble cast led by Luke Perry and Peter Fonda. It originally aired on the Hallmark Channel. The series is of the disaster genre and has a large number of special effects. It was filmed on location in Cape Town, South Africa and Sydney, Australia.

== Plot summary ==
A worldwide scientific conference is taking place in Sydney, Australia when Dr. Austin Shepard (Peter Fonda) suddenly disappears. Dr. Shepard's colleague, Christopher Richardson (Luke Perry) and other individuals are soon faced with the reality of an impending crisis and an attempt to keep the information from the public. While a full-blown supernova does not occur, explosions on the Sun cause massive damage in Australia and in various other parts of the world. During the impending chaos an old enemy of Richardson's wife escapes from prison and immediately sets out to kill her and her daughter.

== Cast ==
- Luke Perry as Dr. Chris Richardson
- Tia Carrere as Lisa Delgado
- Peter Fonda as Dr. Austin Shepard
- Lance Henriksen as Colonel Harlan Williams
- Clemency Burton-Hill as Ginny McKillip
- Emma Samms as Laurie Stephenson
- Jessica Brooks as Brooke Richardson
- Eliza Bennett as Haley Richardson
- Philip Lenkowsky as Grant Cole

== Locations in the film ==
The film features many scenes of worldwide devastation. Notable locations include:

- Paris, France-The Eiffel Tower is damaged by massive lightning bolts.
- Tokyo, Japan-suffers a power outage
- St. Louis, Missouri, United States-The Gateway Arch, Old Courthouse, and the Busch Memorial Stadium are destroyed by a plasma meteor shower from the Sun.
- Maldives-bombarded by a plasma meteor shower
- Sahara Desert-bombarded by a plasma meteor shower, which turns some of its sand dunes into glass. This caused the Sahara desert to become uninhabitable.
- Taj Mahal, India-destroyed by a plasma meteor shower
- Sydney, Australia-This city is the main setting of the film and the Sydney Tower is destroyed and the Sydney Opera House damaged in a plasma meteor shower.
- South African Astronomical Observatory-This is used as the observatory in the film that Shepard and his colleagues use.
