= La Femme Musketeer =

- Written by: Sandra Weintraub
- Directed by: Steve Boyum
- Starring: Michael York; Nastassja Kinski; Susie Amy; John Rhys-Davies; Gérard Depardieu
- Country of origin: United States
- Original language: English

Production
- Running time: 163 minutes

Original release
- Network: Hallmark Channel
- Release: June 20, 2004

La Femme Musketeer (English: "The Musketeer Woman") is a made for television movie produced by Hallmark Entertainment and Larry Levinson Productions, filmed on Draguć in Croatia. It originally premiered on June 20, 2004 on Hallmark Channel.

== Plot ==
The legend of D'Artagnan (Michael York) gets a gender-bending update in this swashbuckling adventure. Though legendary swordsman Jacques D'Artagnan's best days may be well behind him, he has schooled his daughter Valentine (Susie Amy) well in the way of the sword. Now it's time for Valentine to strike out on her own.

With her father's sword and a letter of introduction to Commander Finot (Roy Dotrice), the eager young novice sets out to seek her fortune in Paris. Though a woman has never before been appointed the rank of swordsman, Valentine is determined to prove her worth by taking on a deadly mission to rescue the bride-to-be of King Louis XIV from a band of fearsome kidnappers, teaming with the three sons of the legendary Three Musketeers who rode with her father.

== Cast ==
- Michael York as Jacques D'Artagnan (York had played Dumas' D'Artagnan in three previous films: The Three Musketeers, The Four Musketeers and The Return of the Musketeers}
- Nastassja Kinski as Lady Bolton
- Susie Amy as Valentine D'Artagnan
- John Rhys-Davies as Porthos
- Gérard Depardieu as Cardinal Mazarin
- Kristina Krepela as Maria Theresa of Spain
- Freddie Sayers as King Louis XIV
- Clemency Burton-Hill as Marie Mancini
- Marcus Jean Pirae as Villeroi
- Constantine Gregory as Planchet
- Andrew Musselman as Antoine Porthos
- Christopher Cazenove as Athos
- Casper Zafer as Gaston Athos
- Allan Corduner as Aramis
- Niko Nicotera as Etienne Aramis
- Zrinka Cvitešić as Elena
- Nick Brimble as The General
- Luka Peroš as Funeral Musketeer
- Nicholas Rowe as Duke of Buckingham
- Roy Dotrice as Commander Finot (Uncredited)

== See also ==
- The Three Musketeers, 1844 novel by Alexandre Dumas
- Revenge of the Musketeers (1994 film), which also adds a daughter to d'Artagnan's lore
