= Cristian Solimeno =

British actor, writer and director (born 1975)

- Born: Cristian David Solimeno; 27 April 1975 (age 51); Hammersmith, London, England
- Occupations: Actor, writer and director
- Years active: 1995–present

Cristian David Solimeno (born 27 April 1975) is a British actor, writer and director. He is best known for his role as Jason Turner, Earls Park F.C. captain on the ITV drama series, Footballers' Wives (2002-2003).

== Early life ==
Solimeno was born and raised in London, England and is of Irish and Italian descent.

== Career ==
He has played DC Dick Hall in the fifth and final series of Wycliffe in 1998.

In 2002, he began portraying the role of Jason Turner, Captain of Earls Park F.C. on ITV drama series, Footballers' Wives. He played the philandering husband of Tanya Turner (Zöe Lucker) for the first two seasons. In 2022, journalist Michael Hogan described the couple in The Guardian as: "the most compelling couple by far were villainous team captain Jason Turner (Christian Solimeno) and his wife, Tanya, AKA Lady Macbeth in a mock-Tudor mansion." Some of his character's best-known storylines also included his extramarital affair with Jackie Pascoe (Gillian Taylforth), with their highly publicised liaison on a snooker table and the revelation that their love child was a hermaphrodite.

He has also had a number of guest roles in other British television series, and appeared in the 2000 film Dead Babies, 2005 Happy New Year special of The Vicar of Dibley and the 2006 series Strictly Confidential. He was The Guardian in Highlander: The Source. He starred alongside Philip Glenister, John Simm and Ashley Walters is the 2008 film Tu£sday. In the same year he appeared in Perfect Hideout. In 2011, Solimeno wrote and directed a feature film called The Glass Man starring Andy Nyman and James Cosmo. In 2013, he played Jonathan in The Bible TV Mini-Series. In 2013 and 2014, he played Ray McCormick in Hollyoaks, until his character was allegedly killed by Grace Black (Tamara Wall). In 2018 he can be seen as the troubled lead Dexter in British psychological thriller Welcome to Curiosity.
