= Lucia Giannecchini =

English actress

Lucia Giannecchini is an English actress (born 9 June 1980) who played Urszula Rosen in the fifth season of Footballers' Wives. As a child she lived in Cheshire, England and Lucca, Italy and now resides in Central London.
