= Alison Newman =

English actress (born 1968)

- Born: 25 January 1968 (age 58); Bournemouth, Hampshire, England
- Occupation: Actress
- Spouse: Hugh Williams

Alison Newman (born 25 January 1968) is an English actress best known for her role in the hit ITV1 television series Footballers' Wives as Hazel Bailey, and as DCI Samantha Keeble in the BBC soap opera EastEnders.

== Biography ==
Alison Newman was born in Bournemouth, Hampshire, to David and Jenny Newman. She has one sister called Sarah. Both her parents were schoolteachers who encouraged her to take up acting as a hobby but discouraged her from attending stage school when she was younger, a decision she subsequently agreed was probably sensible. Instead, she joined the National Youth Theatre when she was sixteen. Her father died in October 2002, while she was filming the second series of Footballers' Wives. The producers allowed her to take time off from filming some of her last scenes in the series finale so she could be with her family.

Despite studying drama at the University of Manchester Alison Newman did not work as an actress for almost ten years after graduating. She says that she hated the experience of being at drama school and lost her confidence. During this time, she worked in a variety of professions, including publishing, catering, barwork and spent a number of years working in the music industry.

She returned to acting when she was almost 30 after being offered a part in a play written by Anthony Neilson, with whom she had previously worked as an assistant director. This was followed by a role playing a psychotic serial killer in Touching Evil III (1999) with Robson Green (who she would later appear with in RocketMan), and the film Butterfly Collectors (1999), alongside Pete Postlethwaite.

== Footballers Wives ==
In 2002, Newman was cast in the role of ruthless lesbian football agent, and later club chair, Hazel Bailey in Footballers Wives. Newman was allegedly awarded the role on the strength of a two-episode guest appearance in the series Bad Girls, in which she played Renee Williams who set out to secure revenge on nemesis Top Dog Yvonne Atkins (Linda Henry). Both programmes were made by Shed Productions. The part of Hazel Bailey required Newman to have her naturally blonde hair dyed red. Newman left the show at the end of series 4, when her character decided to return to sports representation, after becoming romantically involved with a professional tennis player.

== Other work ==
After Footballers Wives, Newman played Diane Scott in Rocket Man for BBC One in the autumn of 2005. In 2008, she appeared as Lynette Hopkins in Rock Rivals, another Shed Productions drama for ITV1, and later that year she appeared as Detective Inspector Samantha Keeble in several episodes of the BBC soap EastEnders. She played the part of a back-street abortionist in an episode of the popular BBC One drama Call the Midwife, as well as appearing in the short film Father in 2013. In July 2014 Newman resumed the role of DI Samantha Keeble in EastEnders when her character was put in charge of the Lucy Beale murder case. She departed the role again in June 2016. She returned to the series once again in January 2022 and departed again in January 2023.

Newman has extensive theatre experience, including Loveplay by Moira Buffini; Luminosity by Nick Stafford; Night of the Soul by David Farr and The Big Lie by Anthony Neilson, all for the RSC, as well as The Censor and The Lying Kind, both by Anthony Neilson, for the Royal Court Theatre, London. Between 2003 and 2006, she appeared in Vagina Monologues, both on tour and in the West End. Her most recent theatre work was in Two Women, by Martina Cole, and performed at the Theatre Royal Stratford East between February and March 2010.

She co-created the TV series Harlots with Moira Buffini.

== Personal life ==
Newman is married to Hugh Williams, a graphic designer. They live in Glasgow.

== Filmography ==
=== Television ===
Year	Title	Role	Notes
1998	The Bill	Maria Scanlon	Episode: "Love's Labours Lost"
1999	Touching Evil	Lynn Southy	Episodes: "Fiery Death", Parts One and Two
1999	Great Expectations	Supplicant Mother	
2000	Bad Girls	Renee Williams	Episodes: "Facing Up", and "Rough Justice"
2000	The Bill	Kim Palmer	Episode: "Streetwise"
2001	Family Affairs	Linda Renshaw	
2002–2005	Footballers Wives	Hazel Bailey	Series 1–4
2003	Holby City	Janet Boyd	Episode: "Going it Alone"
2004	Hex	Reverend George	Pilot episode
2004	This Morning	Herself	
2004	Liquid News	Herself	
2005	Rocket Man	Diane Scott	
2005	The New Paul O'Grady Show	Herself	
2005	Open Wide	Rose	
2005	GMTV	Herself	
2005	Favouritism	Herself	Episode: "Boy George's Queerest TV Moments"
2005	Loose Women	Herself	
2006	Doctors	Monica Greely	Episode: "Regular Fare"
2006	Casualty	Jocelyn Pike	Episode: "Family Matters"
2008	TV's 50 Hardest Men	Herself	
2008	Rock Rivals	Lynette Hopkins	
2008	The Wright Stuff	Herself	
2008, 2014–2016, 2022–2023	EastEnders	DI Samantha Keeble	Regular role; 51 episodes
2010	Trinny & Susannah: From Boom to Bust	Clodagh Malone	
2011	New Tricks	Karen Chapman	Episode: "Only the Brave"
2011	Silk	Sue Crocker	
2012	Casualty	Sian Brothwick	Episode: "Hero Syndrome"
2012	Whitechapel	Judy Miles	3 episodes
2013	Call the Midwife	Mrs. Pritchard	
2013	By Any Means	Assistant Commissioner	
2014	Holby City	Angela Doyle	"Affair of the Mind"
2019	Endeavour	Viv Wall	Series 6
2020–present	Dun Breedin	Wanda Walker	Online series; main role

=== Film ===
Year	Title	Role	Notes
1999	The Butterfly Collectors	Sandra Hollins	
2000	The Prince and the Pauper	Ann Canty	
2003	Ashes and Sand	Hayley's Mother	
2006	Kidulthood	Claire's Mum	
2007	i	The Eye	Short
2013	Father	Margherita	Short

=== Theatre ===
Year	Title	Role	Notes
1990	The Tempest	Spirit	Royal Exchange Theatre, Manchester
1997	The Censor	Wife	Finborough Theatre and Royal Court Theatre London
1998	Electronic Dark Age		Edinburgh Festival
2001	Loveplay	Various	RSC
2001	Luminosity	Betty Mercer/Midwife	RSC
2001	Epitaph for the Official Secrets Act	The One Who Stays	RSC Playreading
2002	Night of the Soul	Liz Chappell	RSC
2002	The Lying Kind	Gronya	Royal Court Theatre London
2003–2006	Vagina Monologues		UK tour, and West End
2008	The Big Lie		RSC/Latitude Festival
2008	The Long Road	Elizabeth	Synergy Theatre Project in association with The Forgiveness Project, Soho Theatre, London
2010	Two Women	Doreen	Theatre Royal Stratford East
