= Craig Gallivan =

Welsh actor

- Born: Craig Gallivan; Swansea, Wales
- Occupation: Actor

Craig Gallivan is a Welsh actor best known for playing Luke in the long-running Sky1 television series Stella and Callum Watson in the ITV series Footballers Wives and Footballers' Wives: Extra Time, and his musical theatre roles. From 2018 to 2019, he played the lead role of Dewey in the Andrew Lloyd Webber musical School of Rock, and since 2021 he has been playing Olaf in Disney's Frozen, both in the West End.

== Early years ==
Gallivan spent his early years playing rugby. At the age of 12, he was selected to play for his home city of Swansea and went on to represent West Wales.

The same year, his younger sister Hayley was part of a youth drama group who travelled to London to audition for a revival of the musical Oliver! at the London Palladium in the West End. Gallivan was persuaded to join them and later was offered the small part of Charlie Bates in the production.

== Career ==
Gallivan was trained as an actor at the Royal Academy of Dramatic Art. In 2000 he portrayed Young Terry in the BBC drama Care. In 2006 he played Callum Watson in the ITV1 series Footballers' Wives and the ITV2 spin-off Footballers' Wives: Extra Time and has appeared in the roles of Jamie in Days of Significance with the Royal Shakespeare Company and Soldier in Crime and Punishment with the National Theatre (both in 2008) in London. Also in 2008, he portrayed Jonathan in the episode "From Out of the Rain" on the BBC's Doctor Who spin-off Torchwood. He played Tony Elliot in the musical Billy Elliot in 2010, directed by Stephen Daldry at the Victoria Palace Theatre.

Gallivan starred as Luke Morris in the Sky 1 comedy-drama Stella; the show ran for 6 seasons from 2012 to 2017.

In 2018, Gallivan took over the lead role of Dewey in the Andrew Lloyd Webber musical School of Rock and played that role for longer than any other actor in the show's original West End run. He originated the role of Olaf in West End production of the Disney musical Frozen at the Theatre Royal, Drury Lane, which opened in 2021. A 2023 review in The Daily Telegraph said "Gallivan’s Olaf is the irresistible scene-stealer ... a riot", while one in Daily Express commented, "Olaf is one of my favourite characters on the show, Craig Gallivan's mastery of the puppet makes it easy to forget he's moving him at all. In Summer is a really nice number". A writer for South Wales Life found him "funny and extremely loveable in every way" as Olaf.

== Filmography ==
=== TV ===
Year	Title	Character	Production	Notes
2000	Care	Young Terry	BBC Films	Film
2006	Footballers Wives	Callum Watson	ITV1	TV series (7 episodes)
2006	Footballers' Wives: Extra Time	Callum Watson	ITV2	TV series (2 episodes)
2008	Torchwood	Jonathan	BBC Three	TV series (1 episode, "From Out of the Rain")
2008	The Edge of Love	Sailor Beating Dylan	BBC Films	Feature film
2012–2017	Stella	Luke Morris/Morgan	Sky 1	Main cast (56 Episodes; 2 Christmas specials)
2019	Children in Need telethon	Dewey Fynn	BBC School of Rock	TV specials)
2025	Death Valley	Dean Ward	BBC	TV
2025	The Guest	Marc	BBC	TV
2025	Frozen	Olaf	Disney+	Live recording of stage musical
