= Jamie Davis =

British actor & writer (born 1981)

- Born: 18 April 1981 (age 45); Pontefract, West Yorkshire, England
- Years active: 1993, 2003–present
- Height: 5 ft 11 in (180 cm)
- Children: 2

Jamie Davis (born 18 April 1981) is an English actor and writer. He is known for his roles as Harley Lawson in the ITV drama Footballers' Wives (2004–2005) and its spin-off Extra Time (2005), Leon Taylor in the Sky One series Hex (2004–2005), and Max Walker in the BBC medical soap Casualty (2013–2018). He wrote the miniseries You & Me.

== Biography ==
Davis was born and brought up in Pontefract, West Yorkshire, where he attended Carleton High School. He used to play semi-professional football, and is a self-described supporter of Hannover 96 F.C. He lives with his wife Lucy and their children, Noah and Mabel. They take residence in both England and Wales, depending on Jamie's filming commitments.

== Career ==
Davis started his acting career at the age of 16, in a production of Kes at the West Yorkshire Playhouse in Leeds. His first professional acting role was as a footballer in Trevor's World of Sport.

Davis auditioned for and won the role of Harley Lawson in Footballers' Wives during his third year at drama school. He portrayed Harley for the whole of the third and fourth series of Footballers' Wives and in two episodes of its spin-off, Footballers' Wives: Extra Time.

Between the third and fourth series of Footballers' Wives, Davis appeared alongside John Malkovich in Colour Me Kubrick (2005) and played Leon Taylor in the first season of Hex. He left Footballers' Wives to reprise the role of Leon in Hex season two.

Davis went on to play Davey in The Sarah Jane Adventures episode "Invasion of the Bane" and Steve Sharpe in The Amazing Mrs Pritchard. He has also appeared in episodes of The Bill, Casualty, Two Pints of Lager and a Packet of Crisps and Shameless. He has also appeared in an episode of the BBC drama Death in Paradise (series 2 episode 8).

From 2013 to January 2018, Jamie played the part of Max Walker in the BBC continuing drama series Casualty. He left the show citing that he wanted to spend more time at home, with his wife and two children. Sunetra Sarker honoured her promise to return for one episode as his onscreen estranged wife, Zoe, for his final episode. In 2021 he played Adam, boyfriend of Kym Marsh's Character Donna in the 4th installment of Kay Mellor's the Syndicate.

== Filmography ==
List of acting performances in television and film
Year	Title	Role	Notes
1993	Heartbeat	Neagle Child	1 episode: Secrets
2003	Trevor's World of Sport	Dean Sturgis	1 episode: A Man's Game
2003	Doctors	Justin	1 episode: Cut Loose
2003	Heartbeat	Billy Fletcher	1 episode: Speed
2004	Where The Heart Is	Jamie Smart	2 episodes: Bowl of Cherries; Little Boy Blue
2004–05	Footballers' Wives	Harley Lawson	
2004–05	Hex	Leon Taylor	
2005	Colour Me Kubrick	Duane	Feature film
2005	Footballers' Wives: Extra Time	Harley Lawson	2 episodes: #1.2, #1.3
2006	The Amazing Mrs Pritchard	Steve Sharpe	1 episode: #1.1
2007	The Sarah Jane Adventures	Davey	1 episode: Invasion of the Bane
2008	The Bill	Jem Archer	1 episode: The Deadly Game
2008	Placebo	Brandon Gotts	Sitcom pilot
2009	Casualty	Guy Masterson	1 episode: All You Need Is Love
2009	Two Pints of Lager and a Packet of Crisps	Scott Chegg	1 episode: You Decide
2009	Personal Affairs	Robbie Gascoigne	
2010	Misfits	Ben	1 episode: #1.3
2010	Missing	Marcus Bell	1 episode: #2.1
2010	A Passionate Woman	Terry	1 episode: #1.1
2011	Candy Cabs	Alex Partridge	
2011	Doc Martin	Michael Wilson	1 episode: #5.8
2012	Shameless	Calum	4 episodes: #9.7, #10.4, #10.9, #10.10
2012	Switch	Gerry	5 episodes: #1.2—1.6
2012	Vexed	Liam	1 episode: #2.2
2013	Death in Paradise	Mark Grainger	Series 2, episode 8
2013–2018	Casualty	Max Walker	Regular role
