= Marcel McCalla =

British actor

- Born: United Kingdom
- Occupation: Actor
- Years active: 1995–present

Marcel McCalla is a British actor. He has appeared in several stage productions and television shows, including Grange Hill for five series and Footballers' Wives for two series.

== Theatre ==
McCalla's first role was aged 14 in 1995 in Oliver!. He has had roles in two plays by Roy Williams, Emile in 2003's Fallout and Kev in the 2005 production of Little Sweet Thing. Also in 2005 he played Casey Motsisi in Who Killed Mr Drum?. In 2006, he played Andre in Tanika Gupta's Sugar Mummies and a mentally-ill patient in Joe Penhall's Blue/Orange, and he played Jimmy in A Taste of Honey at the Royal Exchange, Manchester in 2008.

In 2010, he starred in Mustapha Matura's Rum and Coca-Cola as Slim.

== Television ==
McCalla's television roles include parts in Grange Hill, The Bill, Footballers' Wives, and Trexx and Flipside, and he appeared in a BBC Film Network short film called Attack in 2005. He also voiced Freezbone in the children's animation show Freefonix, and he voiced Gomez in Matt Hatter Chronicles.

McCalla's role in Footballers' Wives was in the third series as the gay black footballer Noah Alexander. He faced negative public reactions due to the role. He said of the role that "He's a character that's so different from myself: I don't earn loads of money. I'm not gay, so to play a character like that is a challenge.". In 2011, he voiced Dyzio the Polish Bug in The Lingo Show in 2014, he was the uncredited voice of Ongo in Jelly Jamm. In 2015, he was the voice of Roley the road roller in the UK dub of the Bob the Builder reboot. From 2015 to the present, Marcel was the voice of Asher in Chuggington. From 2017 to onwards, Marcel voices Two, Four, Eight, Octonaughty, Thirteen, Twenty, Twenty-Three, Twenty-Nine, Forty, Fifty-Five, Eighty and Two Hundred in Numberblocks.
