= Gillian Taylforth =

English actress (born 1955)

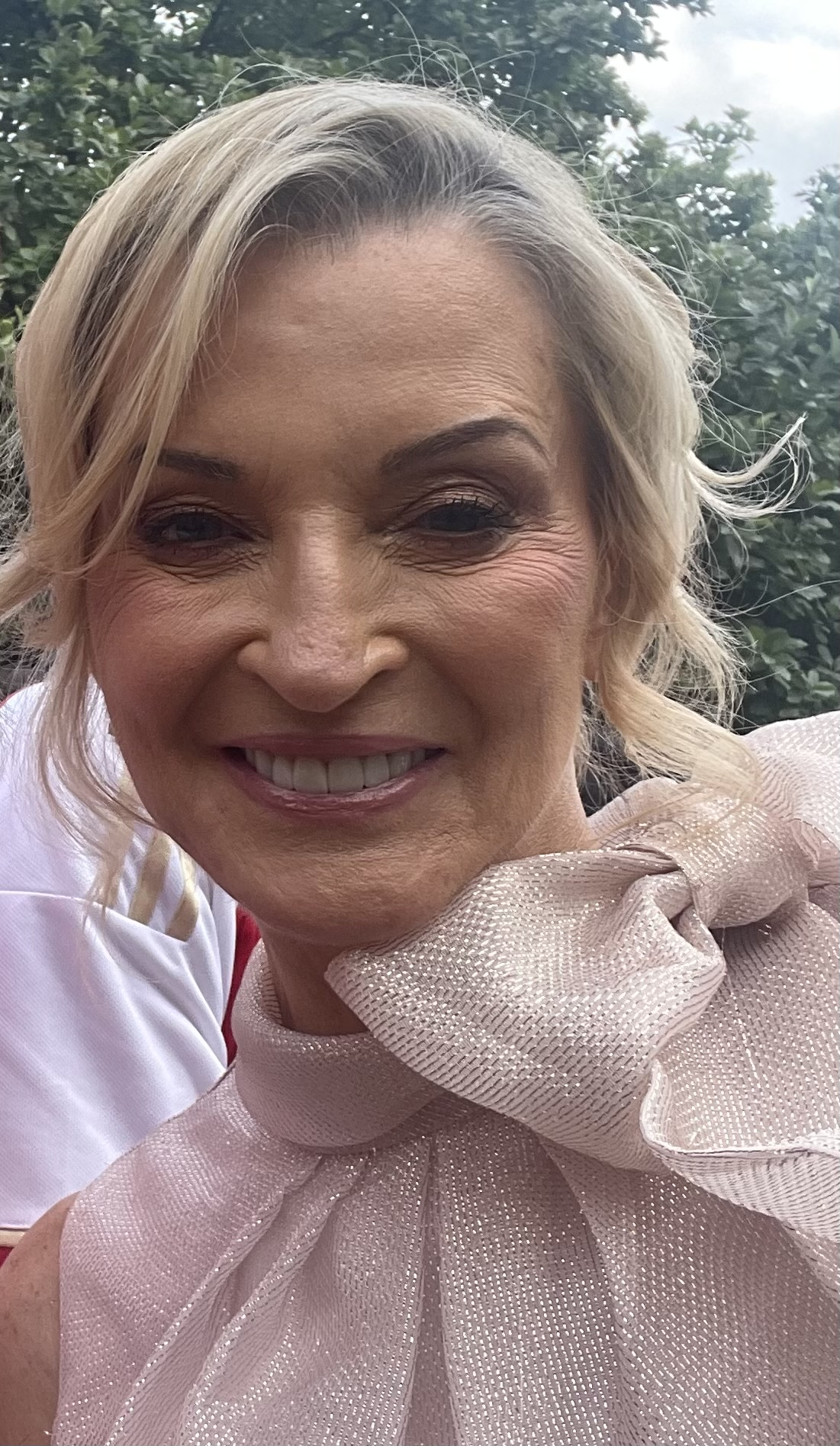
- Taylforth in 2025
- Born: 14 August 1955 (age 70); Islington, London, England
- Occupation: Actress
- Years active: 1974–present
- Television: EastEnders; Messiah 2: Vengeance Is Mine; Footballers' Wives; The Bill; Strictly Come Dancing; Hollyoaks
- Partner: Geoff Knights (1988–2009)
- Children: 2
- Relatives: Kim Taylforth (sister)

Gillian Taylforth (born 14 August 1955) is an English actress who is best known as Kathy Beale in EastEnders (1985–2000, 2015–present), Jackie Pascoe in Footballers' Wives (2002–2006) and Sergeant Nikki Wright in The Bill (2006–2008). She has also appeared in film during her early career, presented on Loose Women and appeared as a contestant on Strictly Come Dancing in 2008.

In January 2013, she was a contestant in Celebrity Big Brother. Later that year, she began portraying Sandy Roscoe on the Channel 4 soap opera Hollyoaks, making her final appearance in January 2015. Despite her EastEnders character being presumed dead after being killed off-screen in 2006, Taylforth made a shock return to the show in February 2015 as part of the 30th anniversary episode. The BBC later confirmed that she would reprise the role of Kathy permanently later in the year and she has appeared regularly from August 2015.

== Early life ==
Taylforth attended William Tyndale Junior School, Barnsbury Secondary School for Girls, Kingsway College of Further Education and the Anna Scher Theatre School in London.

== Career ==
She started her acting career in the 1970s and before securing her big break she worked as a secretary between minor roles. Early television appearances include roles in the BBC comedy Hi-de-Hi!, Shelley, Play for Today, On Safari, Minder, Sink or Swim and The Rag Trade. She played the role of Sherry in the 1980 gangster film The Long Good Friday.

=== EastEnders ===
On 19 February 1985, Taylforth appeared as Kathy Beale in the first episode of the BBC's new soap opera EastEnders. This role earned her huge popularity and public recognition on British television. Taylforth was in the show until 1998, when she opted to leave. During her time on the show, Taylforth's character covered an array of serious issues including rape, domestic violence, teenage pregnancy, divorce, alcoholism and meningitis.

Kathy is one of the longest running characters to feature in the soap. She made a brief return in 1999 for the storyline to aid the departure of her brother-in-law Grant, played by actor Ross Kemp. Kathy left Albert Square again on 6 January 2000.

In 2005, press rumours suggested that Taylforth was returning to the show. However, this did not occur and the character of Kathy died off-screen in February 2006 in a car crash in South Africa. Taylforth later commented: "I was a bit upset at first because it was 13 years of my life and I didn't like the thought of being killed off. I thought she might come back to see Ian [her on-screen son] and have some illness. But that's the way it goes."

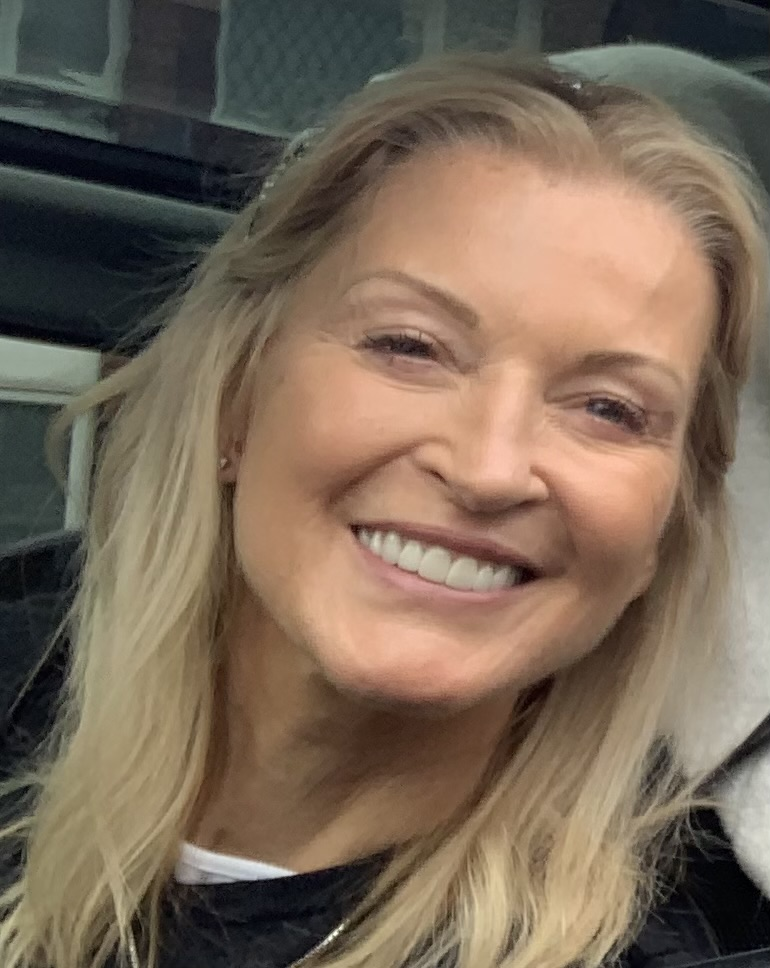
Taylforth outside Elstree Studios in September 2022

In 2013, Taylforth said it was a mistake to "kill off" her character and expressed an interest in coming "back from the dead". She also revealed that former producers had wanted Kathy back in EastEnders. At the time, an EastEnders spokesman said that producers had no plans to bring back Kathy Beale. However, on 14 November 2014, Taylforth reprised the role of Kathy for a Children In Need special in which Ian knocks his head and sees visions of the deceased women in his life.

On 19 February 2015, Taylforth made a surprise appearance as Kathy Beale in a live segment of the 30th anniversary episode. It was revealed that she had not died but instead faked her own death in South Africa in 2006. The BBC then confirmed Taylforth would be reprising the role of Kathy permanently. Kathy then made another guest appearance in May before returning in August on a regular basis. The BBC revealed the screen age of the character Kathy Beale, as 70 years old, in an episode broadcast in 2020.

=== Other work and roles ===
After leaving EastEnders in 1998, Taylforth was cast as Jackie Pascoe in ITV's television drama Footballers' Wives. In a Channel 4 poll for the 100 Greatest Sexy Moments, a time when she ends up having sex on top of a snooker table with Cristian Solimeno was placed at number 49. She played the role for all five series, which made her the only cast member to appear in every series. She also appeared on Lily Savage's Blankety Blank in 2001.

In 2006, she played the role of Mandy Searle in the comedy-drama Jane Hall, and she also has appeared as a recurring panellist on ITV's topical chat-show Loose Women (2000, 2006 and 2008). She had a regular part in ITV's police drama The Bill playing Sergeant Nikki Wright, and made her first screen appearance on 8 November 2006, leaving the role in 2008. In 2010, Taylforth took over in the theatre tour of Mum's the Word from Bernie Nolan after she left when her cancer was diagnosed for a second time. The tour also starred Coronation Street actresses Tracy Shaw and Sally Ann Matthews, and was directed by Taylforth's EastEnders colleague Andrew Lynford. She also made several pantomime appearances around this time.

In January 2013, she became a housemate on the eleventh series of Celebrity Big Brother. She was the fourth person to be evicted from the house after fifteen days.

In February 2013, it was announced that she had joined the cast of British soap opera Hollyoaks as matriarch of the Roscoe family Sandy Roscoe. After just over a year in the role, Taylforth announced her decision to leave to spend more time with her family. She departed on-screen on 22 August 2014. Taylforth briefly reprised the role of Sandy in December 2014, but she departed again shortly afterwards.

=== Strictly Come Dancing ===
Taylforth was partnered with Anton Du Beke in the sixth series of Strictly Come Dancing in 2008, but was voted off in Week 2 after a dance-off with Jodie Kidd. It later emerged that Taylforth had suffered torn knee ligaments while in training for the live shows, but chose to dance regardless.

Week #	Dance/Song	Judges' score					Result
Week #	Dance/Song	Horwood	Phillips	Goodman	Tonioli	Total	Result
2	Foxtrot / "Razzle Dazzle"	4	5	7	6	22	Eliminated

== Personal life ==
Taylforth is the sister of actress Kim Taylforth. During her time in EastEnders, she dated her fellow castmate Nick Berry, who played Simon Wicks. She began a relationship with Geoff Knights in the late 1980s. The couple lived in Broxbourne, Hertfordshire, and later in Arrington, Cambridgeshire. She gave birth to their daughter in 1992. In 1996, she suffered a miscarriage, and less than a year later doctors told her that the baby she was carrying had severe abnormalities and she was advised to terminate the pregnancy." In 1999, she became a mother for a second time.

Knights and Taylforth had an extensive tabloid media history. In January 1994, Taylforth was involved in a high-profile court case when she sued The Sun newspaper for libel after they ran a story claiming she and Knights had performed sexual acts on a slip road on the A1 in their Range Rover. Taylforth claimed that her partner had suffered an acute attack of pancreatitis and she was merely massaging his stomach to soothe his abdominal pain; however, a police officer claimed that she was performing fellatio instead. During the court case, The Sun's defence counsel, George Carman QC, entered into evidence a 35-minute home video of Taylforth "suggestively posing with a large sausage [...] graphically simulating masturbation with a wine bottle" and boasting to the camera, "I give very good head". The jury returned a 10–2 majority verdict in favour of The Sun, after which Taylforth collapsed and was taken away by an ambulance.

In 1995, Taylforth wrote an autobiography, Kathy and Me, in which she describes her childhood, her teenage years, her first forays into acting and her lifestyle.

== Filmography ==
=== Film ===
Year	Title	Role
1978	The One and Only Phyllis Dixey	Girl in café
1978	Twenty Times More Likely	Sandy
1978	Golden Gala	Herself
1980	The Long Good Friday	Sherry
1984	Stars of the Roller State Disco	Kiosk typist
1989	One Day in the Life of Television	Herself
1998	Big Cat	Polly
1998	EastEnders: The Mitchells – Naked Truths	Kathy Beale
2001	I Love Christmas	Herself
2003	Life After The Square	Herself
2004	Footballer's Wives Exposed	Jackie Pascoe
2005	Greatest Before They Were Stars TV Moments	Woolworths Advert
2005	ITV 50 Greatest Shows	Herself
2007	Sex on Trial: The Soapstar Story	Herself
2008	Let Loose... The Very Best of 'Loose Women'	Herself
2009	Almost Famous II	Herself
2009	Donny & Marie: Las Vegas Live	Herself
2010	EastEnders: Last Tango in Walford	Kathy Beale
2011	EastEnders: Greatest Exits	Kathy Beale
2013	The British Soap Awards 2013: The Party	Herself
2014	The Ghosts of Ian Beale	Kathy Beale
2015	EastEnders: Backstage with Zoe Ball & Joe Swash	Herself
2016	Bobby Beale: The Story So Far	Kathy Beale
2017	June Brown at 90: A Walford Legend	Herself
2018	The Best of EastEnders	Kathy Beale
2020	The Big Night In	Kathy Beale
2022	'Allo 'Allo! Forty Years of Laughter	Kathy Beale

=== Television ===
Year	Title	Role	Note
1974	Play for Today	Mavis	Episode: "Eleanor"
1975	Zigger Zagger	Sandra	Regular role, 2 episodes
1976	Plays for Britain	Maureen	Episode: "Fast Hands"
1977–1978	The Rag Trade	Lyn	Regular role, 22 episodes
1978	Somebody's Daughter	Student	5 episodes
1979	Thundercloud	Wren Jepson	Episode: "An English Gentleman"
1979	Shelley	Cashier	Episode: "Moving In"
1980	Watch This Space	Brenda	Regular role, 6 episodes
1980	Shelley	Nurse Rowlands	Episode: "Tea and Sympathy"
1981	Hi De Hi!	Rose	Episode: "Desire in the Mickey Mouse Grotto"
1981	Big Jim and the Figaro Club	Dishmop	Episode: "The Pursuit of Courtly Love"
1981	Sink or Swim	Christine	2 episodes
1982	Scene	Sandra	Episode: "Ties"
1982	On Safari	Herself	Regular role, 30 episodes
1984	Minder	Girl in Pub	Episode: "Senior Citizen Caine"
1984	The Gentle Touch	Mary Felix	Episode: "Do It Yourself"
1985–2000, 2015–present	EastEnders	Kathy Beale	Regular role
1986	Just Another Day	Herself	Episode: "EastEnders"
1986, 1988	Wogan	Herself	2 episodes
1986–1989, 2001	Blankety Blank	Herself	5 episodes
1988	The Noel Edmonds Saturday Roadshow	Herself	Episode: "Series 1, episode 8"
1989	Give Us a Clue	Herself	Episode: "Series 16, episode 3"
1993	Dimensions in Time	Kathy Beale	Charity crossover between Doctor Who and EastEnders
1993	That's Showbusiness	Herself	Episode: "Series 5, episode 12"
1994, 1997, 1999, 2002, 2003	This Is Your Life	Herself	5 episodes
1995	Auntie's Bloomers	Kathy Beale	Episode: "Auntie's New Bloomers 2"
1995	The Weekend Show	Herself	Episode: "Series 1, episode 3"
1995	Littlejohn Live and Uncut	Herself	Episode: "19 May 1995"
1996	The Big Breakfast	Herself	Episode: "18 April 1996"
1998	Operation Good Guys	Herself	Episode: "Holiday"
1998	Lost in France	Carol	Episode: "Lost in France"
1998	Late Lunch	Herself	Episode: "Series 1, episode 14"
1999	Television's Greatest Hits	Herself	Episode: "Series 3, episode 8"
1999	Winton's Wonderland	Herself	Episode: "Series 1, episode 2"
1999, 2013, 2015–2016, 2022–2023	The British Soap Awards	Herself	6 episodes
2000	Fish	Lucy Waters	Episode: "Love's Labour's Lost"
2000	The Knock	Anne Gilbraith	Episode: "Series 5, episode 4"
2000, 2005–2006, 2008–2010, 2016	Loose Women	Herself	Regular panellist
2000	Happy Birthday EastEnders	Herself	Episode: "Series 1, episode 5"
2000	Star Secrets	Herself	Episode: "Series 1, episode 8"
2001	Messiah	Helen Warren	Regular role, 2 episodes
2001	McCready and Daughter	Diane Ryder	Episode: "Hobgoblin"
2001	Celebrity Ready, Steady, Cook	Herself	Episode: "6 May 2001"
2001	Stars and Their Lives	Herself	Episode: "Mike Reid"
2002	The House That Jack Built	Maxine Squire	Regular role, 6 episodes
2002	Messiah 2: Vengeance Is Mine	Helen Warren	Regular role, 2 episodes
2002	Casualty	Justine Walker MP	2 episodes
2002	V Graham Norton	Herself	Episode: "Series 1, episode 34"
2002	GMTV	Herself	Episode: "2 August 2002"
2002–2006	Footballers' Wives	Jackie Pascoe	Regular role, 38 episodes
2004	This Morning	Herself	Episode: "11 February 2004"
2004–2005	Richard & Judy	Herself	2 episodes
2005	New Tricks	Emma Winters	Episode: "Eyes Down for a Full House"
2006	Jane Hall	Mandy Searle	Regular role, 6 episodes
2006–2008	The Bill	Sgt. Nikki Wright	Regular role, 56 episodes
2006, 2009	The Paul O'Grady Show	Herself	2 episodes
2008	Strictly Come Dancing	Herself	6 episodes
2008	Strictly Come Dancing: It Takes Two	Herself	2 episodes
2008	Celebrity Ding Dong	Herself	Episode: "Series 2, episode 1"
2009	Casualty	Gloria	Episode: "Parent Trap"
2009	Ready, Steady, Cook	Herself	Episode: "Series 20, episode 6"
2009–2010	Missing	Judy Waverley	Episode: "Series 2, episode 6"
2009–2010	The Alan Titchmarsh Show	Herself	2 episodes
2010	EastEnders: The Greatest Cliffhangers	Kathy Beale	Episode: "Series 1, episode 2"
2010	Breakfast	Herself	Episode: "19 February 2010"
2012	Daybreak	Herself	13 episodes
2013	Celebrity Big Brother	Herself	19 episodes
2013	The Wright Stuff	Herself	Episode: "Series 18, episode 11"
2013	Big Brother's Bit on the Side	Herself	18 episodes
2013	Stitch Me, Lift Me, Tuck Me	Herself	Episode: "Series 1, episode 8"
2013–2015	Hollyoaks	Sandy Roscoe	Regular role, 161 episodes
2017	Lorraine	Herself	Episode: "7 November 2017"
2020	EastEnders: Secrets from the Square	Kathy Beale	4 episodes
2020	EastEnders: Secrets from the Square	Herself	Episode: "Kathy and Ian"
2020	The One Show	Herself	Episode: "17 February 2020"
2022–2023	The National Television Awards	Herself	2 episodes
2023	EastEnders: The Six	Herself	2 episodes
2025	EastEnders: 40 Years on the Square	Herself	Interviewed guest
2026	Michael McIntyre's Big Show	Kathy Beale	1 episode

== Theatre ==
Year	Title	Role	Notes
1988–1989	Aladdin	The Genie	Ashcroft Theatre, Croydon
2003	Bad Blood	Catherine	Churchill Theatre, Bromley
2005–2006	Snow White and the Seven Dwarfs	Wicked Queen	Swansea Grand Theatre
2010	Mum's The Word	Robin	UK Tour
2010–2011	Cinderella	Fairy Godmother	Broxburne Civic Theatre
2011–2012	Girls Night	Carol	UK Tour

== Awards and nominations ==
Year	Award	Category	Work	Result	Ref.
2007	TVQuick & TVChoice Awards	Best Actress	The Bill	Nominated	
2017	Inside Soap Awards	Outstanding Achievement	EastEnders	Won	
