= Daniel Schutzmann =

British actor

Daniel Schutzmann is a British-Israeli actor. He is known for his roles as Italian football player Salvatore Biagi on the ITV drama Footballers' Wives, Marty Green in BBC Scotland River City and Franc Christophe on the BBC soap opera Doctors.

== Career ==
Schutzmann has also appeared in a number of episodes of the Australian soap opera Neighbours during a storyline filmed in London. He played another footballer Pete Gartside, the boyfriend of Izzy Hoyland (played by Natalie Bassingthwaighte).

Recently he has appeared as a waiter in Coronation Street in scenes involving Carla Connor's hen party.

From 2014 to 2015, he portrayed Franc Christophe in the daytime soap Doctors.
