= Tom Swire =

British actor

Tom Swire (born 1981) is a former British actor best known for playing Seb Webb in Footballers Wives and its ITV2 spin-off Footballers' Wives: Extra Time. He has also appeared in the BBC series Blackpool. Swire has since retired from acting and is now the director of a cleaning company based in Blackpool.
