= Ross Finbow =

British actor

Ross Finbow (born 3 August 1982, in Glasgow) is a British actor known for playing Woody in the ITV2 drama Footballers' Wives: Extra Time.

In 2005 he starred in an independent film, Gamerz, as a character called Ralph. This film received a number of good reviews but unfortunately did not secure wide distribution. It is available as a Region 1 DVD.

He has also appeared in an episode of Taggart (a long running Scottish television programme) as a nurse.
