= On Safari (1982 game show) =

British children's game show

- Genre: Children's game show
- Created by: Tony McLaren; Tim Edmunds
- Presented by: Christopher Biggins
- Starring: Gillian Taylforth
- Theme music composer: Roar Music
- Country of origin: United Kingdom
- Original language: English
- No. of series: 4
- No. of episodes: 54 (inc. 1 special)

Production
- Running time: 20 minutes
- Production company: TVS

Original release
- Network: ITV
- Release: 16 February 1982 – 11 December 1984

On Safari is a British children's game show that aired on ITV from 16 February 1982 to 11 December 1984, and was hosted by Christopher Biggins and co-hosted by Gillian Taylforth.

== Gameplay ==
Each week two teams (three in the first series) consisting of a child and their parent (a celebrity in the third and fourth series) played in a series of games in different jungle settings (i.e. swamps, venus fly traps etc.) and the team with the most points at the end of the show were the winners. The child from the winning team won a major prize, while the losing children went away with consolation prizes.

== Transmissions ==
=== Series ===
Series	Start date	End date	Episodes
1	16 February 1982	18 May 1982	13
2	10 September 1982	17 December 1982	15
3	3 January 1984	3 April 1984	13
4	18 September 1984	11 December 1984	13

=== Special ===
Date	Entitle
22 December 1982	Christmas Special
