= Angela Ridgeon =

British actress

Angela "Angel" Ridgeon is a British actress best known for her role as Trisha Watson on the fifth series of Footballers' Wives.

== Filmography ==
- Footballers' Wives as Trisha Watson (2006)
- Footballers' Wives: Extra Time as Trisha Watson (1 episode, 2006)
- William and Mary as Woman with Baby (1 episode, 2005)
- Life Begins as Mrs. Murray (1 episode, 2004)
- The Bill as Emma Hooper / ... (3 episodes, 1999–2004)
- Wall of Silence (2004) (TV) (as Angela Ridgedon)
- My Family as Nursery Nurse (1 episode, 2003)
- Murder in Mind as Michelle Croft (1 episode, 2002)
- Holby City as Danielle (1 episode, 2001), Holby City Extra Time (2001) as Danielle
- Martian Gothic: Unification (2000) (VG) (voice) (as Angel Ridgeon)
- Call Red as Lianne (1 episode, 1996)
