= Jessica Brooks =

English actress (born 1981)

- Born: Jessica Kate Brooks; 28 May 1981 (age 44); Ealing, London, England
- Occupation: Actress
- Years active: 2001–present

Jessica Kate Brooks (born 28 May 1981) is an English actress. In musical theatre, she is a soprano. She is also a trained voice-over artist, and has studied classics at Oxford University.

Her career started with a 2001 episode of Murder Rooms: Mysteries of the Real Sherlock Holmes, continuing with guest appearances in single episodes of other series. In 2003, she had a recurring role in series 2 of Footballers' Wives. That same year, Brooks had a starring role as Ghanima Atreides, in the miniseries Children of Dune.

In 2003, she co-starred in her first feature film, Collusion. After appearing in a 2009 episode of Hotel Babylon, her next screen appearance was a 2023 episode of Mrs Sidhu Investigates.

In 2008, she played the role of Lisa Houseman in the West End production of Dirty Dancing: The Classic Story on Stage, at London's Aldwych Theatre.

== Filmography ==
=== Filmography ===
note: Film role, unless otherwise noted

Film & Television
Year	Title	Role	Type
2001	Murder Rooms: Mysteries of the Real Sherlock Holmes	Elizabeth Proctor	Episode: "The Kingdom of Bones"
2003	Adventure Inc	Lucy Lyle	Episode: "Angel of St. Edmunds"
2003	Ferrari	Lina Lardi	TV movie
2003	Footballers' Wives	Federica Hauser	Recurring role (series 2)
2003	Children of Dune	Ghanima Atreides	Miniseries
2003	Collusion	Serena Ames	
2003	Blue Dove	Zoe	Miniseries
2004	Nature Unleashed: Avalanche	Callie	Direct-to-video
2005	Supernova	Brooke Richardson	TV movie
2005	Red Mercury	Jemma	
2006	Midsomer Murders	Fiona Aynscombe	Episode: "Four Funerals and a Wedding"
2006	Casualty	Nickie Soames	Episode: "All Through the Night"
2007	The Bill	DI Liz Brown	Episode: "Death or Glory"
2008	Swan Song	Beth	Video short
2009	Hotel Babylon	Zoe	1 episode
2023	Mrs Sidhu Investigates	Wanda Norris	Episode: "Ripped"
