= Nathan Constance =

British actor

- Born: 7 January 1979 (age 47); London, England
- Years active: 1993–present
- Television: Dream Team (1998–99); Bad Girls (2000–02); Footballers' Wives (2002–03)
- Height: 5 ft 7 in (170 cm)

Nathan Constance (born 7 January 1979) is an English actor and voice-over artist, best known for his work as a character performer in AAA Video Games, as handyman-turned-prison officer Josh Mitchell in prison drama series Bad Girls, and as footballer Ian Walmsley in TV drama Footballers Wives. Other films he is known for include Results (2013), Dog Eat Dog (2001), and Bonded by Blood (2010).

His top credits include the role of Gorgutz 'Ead'unter in Warhammer 40,000: Dawn of War III, Marcus Graves in Titanfall, and Adyr in Lords of the Fallen.

== Filmography ==
| Year | Title | Role | Notes |
|---|---|---|---|
| 1993 | The Bill | 1st Older Schoolboy | Series 9 (guest, #9.25) |
| 1995 | The Biz | Luke | Series 2 (guest, 1 episode) |
| 1996 | The Bill | Peter Bailey | Series 12 (guest, #12.77) |
| 1996 | 2Point4Children | Boy Band Member | Series 6 (guest, #6.7) |
| 1997 | Frighteners | Jevan | Series 1 (guest, #1.3) |
| 1998 | The Bill | Martin Davis | Series 14 (guest, #14.75) |
| 1998–99 | Dream Team | Lean Richards | Series 2–3 (main, 80 episodes) |
| 1999 | Wonderland | Alex | Michael Winterbottom |
| 1999 | A Kind of Hush | Tony | Brian Stirner |
| 2000–02 | Bad Girls | Josh Mitchell | Series 2–3 (main, 20 episodes); Series 4 (recurring, 4 episodes) |
| 2001 | Royalty | Marcus | Short film |
| 2001 | Dog Eat Dog | Jess | Moody Shoaibi |
| 2002–03 | Footballers' Wives | Ian Walmsley | Series 1–2 (main, 12 episodes) |
| 2003 | The Afternoon Play | Gavin | Series 1 (guest, #1.5) |
| 2003 | The Bill | Mark Davies | Series 19 (recurring, 3 episodes) |
| 2004 | Holby City | Jamie Patterson | Series 6 (guest, #6.32) |
| 2006 | London to Brighton | Chum | Paul Andrew Williams |
| 2008 | Adulthood | Ike | Noel Clarke |
| 2008 | Broken Lines | Yoss | Sallie Aprahamian |
| 2009 | Hunter | DC Connor | Miniseries (2 episodes) |
| 2009 | Waking the Dead | David O'Neal | Series 8 (guest, 2 episodes) |
| 2010 | Misfits | Vince | Series 2 (guest, #2.3) |
| 2010 | Bonded by Blood | Ravi | Sacha Bennett |
| 2012 | Public Enemies | Bryan Willcott | Miniseries (1 episode) |
| 2013 | Results | Jason | Also writer, director, producer and composer |

=== Video games ===
- Killzone: Mercenary – Boris (2013)
- Titanfall – Vice Admiral Marcus Graves (2014)
- Lords of the Fallen – Adyr (2014)
- The Order: 1886 – Various (2015)
- Battlefield 1 – Various (2016)
- Warhammer 40.000: Down of War III – Gorgutz "Ead"unter (2017)
