= Katherine Monaghan =

British actress (born 1980)

Katherine Monaghan (born 1980) is a British actress best known for her role as Donna Walmsley on Footballers' Wives. Since then she has appeared in the BBC dramas 55 Degrees North and Judge John Deed.

Away from television Monaghan also works as a voice over artist and has appeared at London's Theatre503 and Live Theatre Company in her native Newcastle.

Monaghan was born in Newcastle.
