= Julie Legrand =

British actress

- Born: Julie Legrand; Pitlochry, Scotland
- Occupation: Actress
- Years active: 1980–present
- Spouse: Simon Clark (m. 2005)

Julie Legrand (born in Pitlochry, Scotland) is a British television, film, and stage actress best known for her role as Jeanette Dunkley on Footballers' Wives. She has also guest starred in a wide variety of British television shows, as well as stage productions.

== Television ==
One of her earliest roles was in the Channel 4 comedy drama Hollywood Hits Chiswick, alongside Derek Newark as W.C. Fields. Her subsequent television career has been extensive, including appearances in Anglo-Saxon Attitudes. Kavanagh QC and Holby City.

== Theatre ==
Along with her television work, Legrand has had numerous successes within theatre, most recently in See How They Run and has also starred in Fiddler on the Roof in the West End at The Savoy theatre and as the Wicked Witch of the West in The Wizard of Oz, along with the films One for the Road, Prick Up Your Ears, and Water. She also toured Britain in the RSC's Romeo and Juliet as The Nurse. She played the role of Madame Morrible in the West End production of Wicked. She began performances on 29 March 2010, replacing Harriet Thorpe. After a lengthy run, Legrand exited the show on 27 October 2012, and was replaced by Louise Plowright on Oct. 29, 2012. in 2014-2015 Legrand portrayed Electra in Gypsy at the Chichester Festival Theatre and the subsequent transfer to the Savoy Theatre in London. In 2016 Legrand played Mrs. Malaprop in Sheridan's The Rivals in Bristol and Glasgow.

== Personal life ==
Julie Legrand married Simon Clark, a sound engineer, in 2005.

== Filmography ==
Year	Title	Role	Notes
1980	Angels	Social worker	Series 6 Episode 25
1981	The Innes Book of Records		Series 3 Episode 2
1984	Play for Today	Frenchwoman	Episode: "Under the Hammer"
1985	Water	Business executive	
1987	Prick Up Your Ears	Gallery Owner	
1989	4 Play	Babs	Episode: "Chains of Love"
1990	Coasting	Anna Milburn	Episode: "Star Quality"
1991	El C.I.D.	Laura	Episode: "Piece of Cake"
1991	The House of Bernarda Alba	Angustius	Television film
1991	Turbulence	Annie	
1992	Anglo-Saxon Attitudes	Clarissa Crane	3 episodes
1992	The Bill	Marie Nevin	Episode: "Spit and Polish"
1993	Inspector Morse	Brigitte de Plessy	Episode: "Twilight of the Gods"
1994	Moving Story	Angela	Episode:"Father's Day"
1996	The Bill	Helen Brodie	Episode: "Judgement Call"
1999	Kavanagh QC	Maggie Leeming	
1999	Holby City	Hazel	Episode: "Search for the Hero"
1999	Starting Out	Marjie	8 episodes
1999	Station		Short film
2000	Bad Girls	Rita Dockley	Episode: "Babes Behind Bars"
2000	North Square	Tilly HUdson	Series 1 Episode 2
2001	Treasure	Mrs. P	Voice only
2002	Fields of Gold	Deborah Miller	Television film
2002	Casualty	Jennifer Woods	Episode: "It's a Boy Thing"
2002-2003	Night and Day	Nurse Bradshaw	11 episodes
2002-2005	Footballers' Wives	Jeanette Dunkley	10 episodes
2003	'One for the Road	Liz	
2005	The Bill	Marie Stimpson	2 episodes
2006	Footballers Wives: Extra Time	Jeanette Dunkley	7 episodes
2006	Ex Memoria	Helen	
2006	One Hundredth of a Second	Mary Kennington	
2009	Doctors	Barbara Warton	Episode: "Hang Onto Nurse"
2010	Doctor Who	The Partisan	Episode: "The End of Time: Part Two"
2014	Holby City	Paula Burrows	10 episodes
2015	Gypsy: Live from the Savoy Theatre	Miss Cratchitt / Electra	Television film
2017	Cupidity	Mrs. Constantine	Short film
2019	Doctors	Janice Burckin	Episode: "Boomerang"
2020	Flack	Shell	Episode: "Brand Barron"
