= Zöe Lucker =

English actress (born 1974)

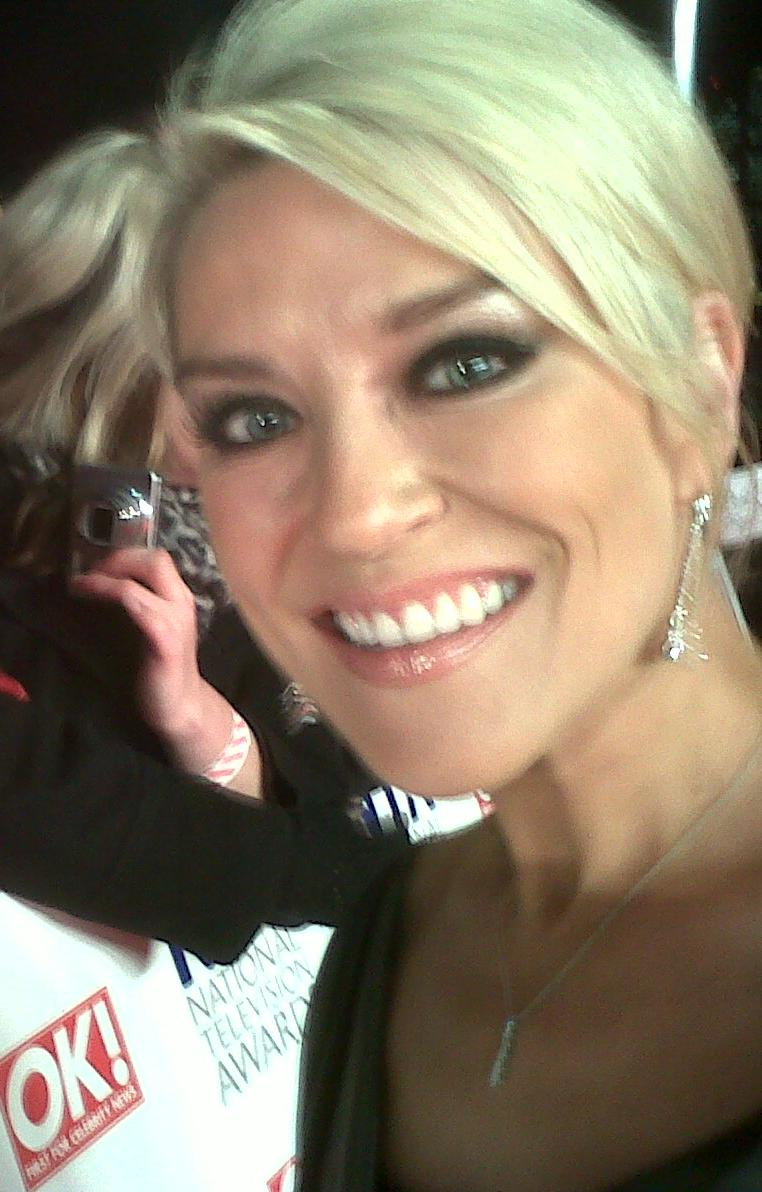
- Lucker in 2010
- Born: Zöe Elizabeth Lucker; 11 April 1974 (age 52); Huddersfield, West Yorkshire, England
- Education: Arden School of Theatre
- Occupation: Actress
- Years active: 1996–2016
- Spouse: Richard Forshaw (m. 2001; div. 2001)
- Partner: James Herbert (2007–present)
- Children: 1

Zöe Elizabeth Lucker (born 11 April 1974) is an English former actress. She is known for her roles as Tanya Turner in the ITV drama series, Footballers' Wives; Vanessa Gold in the long-running BBC One soap opera, EastEnders; Carol Barry in the BBC One school-based drama series, Waterloo Road; and Reenie McQueen in the Channel 4 soap opera, Hollyoaks.

== Education ==
Lucker was educated at Huddersfield New College. She studied acting at Oscars Academy of Performing Arts in Huddersfield, and later at the Manchester Arden School of Theatre.

== Career ==
In 2002, Lucker began portraying the role of Tanya Turner on ITV drama series, Footballers' Wives. In 2004, she was nominated and won a TV Quick and TV Choice Award for Best Actress for her role of Tanya Turner; she was also nominated for a National Television Award in the category of Most Popular Actress for her work on Footballers' Wives. In 2005, Lucker toured New Zealand extensively in the play Then Comes Love as the female lead Jane opposite Shane Cortese and played the lead role in Bombshell for ITV1, although the series was ultimately only broadcast in New Zealand. She also appeared in BBC drama series, HolbyBlue, playing the role of Kate Keenan. In 2009, Lucker appeared on Who Wants to Be a Millionaire? alongside John Suchet, winning £150,000 for the Caron Keating Foundation

In September 2009, Lucker was announced as a contestant for series 7 of Strictly Come Dancing. Her former Footballers Wives co-star, Laila Rouass also participated in the series. She was partnered up with professional ballroom dancer James Jordan. Despite earning high scores and having the third highest average, the couple were eliminated on 31 October, after being in a dance-off against Ali Bastian and her partner Brian Fortuna. In November that year, it was confirmed that she would take part in the Strictly Come Dancing 2010 live tour at arenas across the UK.

Week #	Dance / Song	Judges' score				Result
Week #	Dance / Song	Horwood	Goodman	Dixon	Tonioli	Result
2	Waltz / "Some Day My Prince Will Come"	7	8	7	8	Safe
2	Rumba / "Out of Reach"	8	7	8	8	Safe
3	Paso Doble / "You've Got The Love"	7	8	8	8	Safe
4	Foxtrot / "This Will Be (An Everlasting Love)"	8	9	8	8	Safe
5	Jive / "Tainted Love"	7	8	8	7	Bottom two
6	American Smooth / "My Girl"	8	8	9	8	Safe
7	Samba / "Boogie Nights"	7	8	9	8	Eliminated

In March 2010, Lucker joined the cast of BBC soap opera, EastEnders, to portray the role Vanessa Gold. She left in October 2011. In June 2012, Lucker joined the cast of Waterloo Road, to play Carol Barry, the matriarch of the crime family from Liverpool. In February 2015, Lucker joined the cast of Hollyoaks, to play Reenie McQueen. Reenie has been billed as "good-time party girl without an 'off' switch and can be exhausting company although deep down she is the most vulnerable of Nana's children" and hasn't set the best example to her children and has let them down in the past. She made her first appearance on 16 April 2015. It was later announced in December 2015 that Lucker would be leaving the role at the conclusion of the child sexual abuse storyline, with Reenie making her final appearance on 30 June 2016. In January 2024, eight years after her last acting role, Lucker stated to Attitude that she was on an indefinite hiatus from acting.

== Personal life ==
Lucker married Richard Forshaw in 2001 but they divorced later in the same year. Lucker is engaged to her partner, film editor James Herbert, with whom she had a daughter in September 2008.

== Filmography ==
Year	Title	Role	Network	Notes
1996	Coronation Street	Sonya Leach	ITV	2 episodes
1996	Brazen Hussies	Busty Babs	BBC Two	Television film
1997	Where the Heart Is	Jane	ITV	Episode: "Summoned by Bells"
1998	Killer Net	Carol	Channel 4	Mini-series; 3 episodes
1999	Boyz Unlimited	Kirsty Bellamy	Channel 4	Episode 5
1999	Barbara	Karen	ITV	Episode: "Rivals"
2000	Doctors	Sandy Hansen	BBC One	1 episode
2000	Trial & Retribution	Catrina Roberts	ITV	2 episodes
2002	Holby City	Sharon Simons	BBC One	Episode: "Pawns in the Game"
2002–2006	Footballers' Wives	Tanya Turner	ITV	Main role; 35 episodes (series 1–5)
2004	Bad Girls	Tanya Turner	ITV	Guest role; 3 episodes (series 6)
2006	Bombshell	Jenna Marston	ITV	Main role; 7 episodes (series 1)
2007–2008	HolbyBlue	Kate Keenan	BBC One	Main role; 20 episodes (series 1–2)
2009	Strictly Come Dancing	Herself	BBC One	Series 7 contestant
2010–2011	EastEnders	Vanessa Gold	BBC One	Regular role; 96 episodes
2013–2014	Waterloo Road	Carol Barry	BBC One	Recurring role; 8 episodes (series 8); Regular role; 15 episodes (series 9–10)
2015	24 Hours in the Past	Herself	BBC One	Historical reality television series
2015–2016	Hollyoaks	Reenie McQueen	Channel 4	Regular role; 63 episodes

== Awards ==
- Nominated for Most Popular Actress, 2004 – National Television Awards
- Most Popular Actress, 2004 TV Quick Awards
