= Roy Hudd =

English comedian, actor, presenter and writer (1936–2020)

Roy Hudd OBE
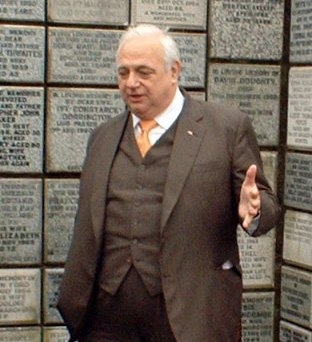
- Hudd in 2005
- Born: 16 May 1936; Croydon, Surrey, England
- Died: 15 March 2020 (aged 83); Ipswich, Suffolk, England
- Resting place: All Saints' Church, Crowfield, Suffolk, England
- Occupations: Actor; radio personality; playwright; author
- Years active: 1957–2020
- Spouses: Ann Lambert (m. 1961; div. 1983) Debbie Flitcroft (m. 1988)
- Children: 1

Signature
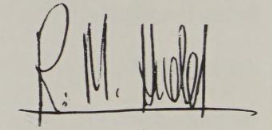

Roy Hudd (16 May 1936 – 15 March 2020) was an English comedian, actor, radio host, author and authority on the history of music hall entertainment.

== Early life ==
Hudd was born in Croydon on 16 May 1936 to Evalina "Evie" (née Barham) and Harry Hudd. His father was a carpenter who left the family shortly after the Second World War, and his mother, who had a history of mental health problems, died by suicide when Hudd was nine years old. Hudd was primarily brought up by his grandmother, and attended Tavistock Secondary Modern School in Croydon and Croydon Secondary Technical School. After completing his national service in the Royal Air Force, he studied commercial art at the Regent Street Polytechnic. He then worked as a messenger for an advertising agency, as a window dresser, and as a commercial artist, working under Harry Beck.

He made his professional debut as a comedian at the Streatham Hill Theatre on 27 October 1957, in a show in aid of the Sir Philip Game Boys' Club, of which he had been a member. Initially he worked with Eddie Kay, a friend from Croydon who had also been a member of the boys' club, the two billing themselves as "the peculiar pair". In 1958, they joined Butlin's Clacton as Redcoats, working alongside Cliff Richard and Dave Allen.

== Career ==
=== Radio ===
Although Hudd and Kay had made a brief appearance as "discoveries" on the BBC's In Town Tonight in 1958, Hudd made his solo debut on radio in 1959 on Workers' Playtime. His BBC Radio 2 satirical series The News Huddlines ran from 1975 to 2001. His other radio credits include playing Max Quordlepleen, the host at The Restaurant at the End of the Universe, in the original radio series of The Hitchhiker's Guide to the Galaxy (1978), Crowned Hudds (1994–95), The Newly Discovered Casebook of Sherlock Holmes (1999–2000) and Like They've Never Been Gone (1999–2002).

=== Television ===
Hudd started to work in television in the mid-1960s in sketch series such as The Illustrated Weekly Hudd and The Roy Hudd Show. His acting roles included the Dennis Potter series Lipstick on Your Collar, for which he received critical praise, and Karaoke. In the mid 1990s, he appeared in two series of Common As Muck, a drama about a group of refuse collectors, alongside Edward Woodward. In 2000, Hudd appeared as neighbour Mr Smedley in an episode of One Foot in the Grave. From 2002 to 2003, he appeared as the undertaker Archie Shuttleworth in the ITV soap opera Coronation Street and subsequently returned for guest appearances in 2006 and 2010; the character died offscreen in December 2018. He also starred in the ITV drama The Quest, alongside Sir David Jason and Hywel Bennett, from 2002 to 2004. In 2007, he appeared in episodes of New Tricks, Casualty (and again in July 2019) and The Last Detective. In 2010, he appeared in BBC dramas Missing and Ashes to Ashes, as well as two episodes of Just William.

In 2012, he appeared in an episode of the BBC drama Call the Midwife. In 2014, he appeared in episodes of Midsomer Murders, Law & Order: UK and Holby City. In December 2015, Hudd played Bud Flanagan in the BBC drama We're Doomed! The Dad's Army Story, about the creation of the titular long-running sitcom. In 2016 he appeared in an episode of Benidorm. In 2017, he appeared in the ITV series Broadchurch.

=== Theatre ===
Hudd appeared in many pantomime and variety performances. In 1977 he starred as Fagin in the West End revival of Lionel Bart's musical Oliver! at the Albery Theatre and, in 1982, he played Bud Flanagan in Underneath the Arches at the Prince of Wales Theatre, for which he won a Society of West End Theatre Award. In 2000, he starred in a musical version of Hard Times at the Theatre Royal Haymarket. In May 2008 Hudd appeared as Njegus in the English National Opera production of The Merry Widow at the London Coliseum, and the same year, he played the part of the Wizard in a production of The Wizard of Oz at London's Royal Festival Hall. Hudd played Tom Oakley in Goodnight Mister Tom at the Theatre Royal Bury St Edmunds in 2018. This was Hudd's local theatre, and was described as "a theatre he absolutely loved" by his wife Debbie. In 2019, he toured the UK in a production of Oscar Wilde's play A Woman of No Importance, alongside Liza Goddard and Isla Blair.

=== Music hall ===
Hudd wrote several books on music hall, re-recorded music hall songs, and appeared in the music hall revival show The Good Old Days. He was seen by broadcasters as an authority on the subject, and was the longstanding President of the British Music Hall Society. His CD, Mirth, Magic and Melodrama consists of a collection of classic monologues from the music hall days, including The Pig and The Lion and Albert, first recorded by Stanley Holloway. For Celebrity Mastermind, broadcast in January 2014, Hudd answered questions on the specialist subject of music hall comedian Dan Leno.

He was an authority on the comedian Max Miller, and was known for his impersonation of Miller. Hudd appeared as his hero in the Big Finish Productions Doctor Who audio play Pier Pressure in 2006. He was President of the Max Miller Appreciation Society.

== Charity work ==
Hudd had a long association with the Bristol Hospital Broadcasting Service, where he was considered an honorary member. In 1994, he officially opened their current studios in the Bristol Royal Infirmary. He was also a past King Rat of the show business charity the Grand Order of Water Rats in 1989 and 2000.

In addition to this, he was the first Honorary President of Sandwell Hospital Radio in West Bromwich, for a period of ten years, visiting the studios, members and patients whenever he was appearing in the West Midlands.

== Personal life and death ==
Hudd was married to Ann Lambert in 1961; they divorced in 1983. He married Debbie Flitcroft in 1988. He latterly lived in Crowfield, Suffolk.

Hudd was appointed an Officer of the Order of the British Empire (OBE) in the 2004 New Year Honours List for services to entertainment. In 1983 (1982 season), he was awarded the Society of West End Theatre Award as Best Actor in a Musical for his role in Underneath the Arches, as Bud Flanagan.

On 29 November 2010, Hudd was awarded an honorary degree of Doctor of Letters by the University of Westminster; he studied commercial art there when it was the Regent Street Polytechnic.

Hudd died in Ipswich Hospital on 15 March 2020, at the age of 83, following a short illness. He was buried in Crowfield, Suffolk. In 2025, a headstone in the style of a music hall theatrical poster was installed at his grave.

== Filmography ==
Year	Title	Role	Notes
1968	The Blood Beast Terror	Smiler	
1971	Up Pompeii	Nero's M.C.	
1971	The Magnificent Seven Deadly Sins	Fisherman	(segment "Avarice")
1972	Up the Chastity Belt	Nick the Pick	
1972	The Alf Garnett Saga	Milkman	
1973	An Acre of Seats in a Garden of Dreams	Narrator	
1994	The Memoirs of Sherlock Holmes	John Gedgrave	"The Dying Detective"
1999	A Kind of Hush	Chef	
2000	Purely Belter	Mr Sewell	
2005	Jack, the Last Victim	Sir Geoffrey	
2014	Robot Overlords	Morse Code Martin	
2018	Patrick	Eric the Caretaker	

== Bibliography ==
Hudd books began to be published in 1971:

- Joke Book (Mini-ha-ha Books) by Roy Hudd (Paperback – 28 May 1971)
- Music Hall (Picturefile) by Roy Hudd (Paperback – 4 November 1976)
- The News Huddlines by Roy Hudd and Illustrated (Paperback – 1 January 1980)
- Beautiful Dreamer: A musical melodrama based on the life and songs of Stephen Collins Foster by Roy Hudd (Unknown Binding – 1981)
- Underneath the Arches by Patrick, Glanville, Brian, Hudd, Roy Garland (Paperback – 1982)
- Underneath the Arches: Musical in Two Acts by Patrick Garland, Brian Glanville, and Roy Hudd (Paperback – 1984)
- That's Entertainment: Vol.1 by Roy Hudd, etc. (Paperback – 1 December 1992)
- Roy Hudd's Book of Music-hall, Variety and Showbiz Anecdotes by Roy Hudd (Hardcover – October 1993)
- Roy Hudd's Huddline Annual by Roy Hudd and Tony Hare (Hardcover – October 1994)
- I Say, I Say, I Say: Johnners' Choice of Jokes to Keep You Laughing by Brian Johnston and Roy Hudd (Paperback – 4 September 1995)
- The Pantomime Book by Paul Harris and Roy Hudd (Paperback – August 1996)
- Look Back with Laughter. Volume Three by Mike Craig, Dame Thora Hird, and Roy Hudd (Paperback – 1998)
- Roy Hudd's Cavalcade of Variety Acts: A Who Was Who of Light Entertainment, 1945–60 by Roy Hudd and Philip Hindin (Paperback – 18 November 1998)
- Roy Hudd's Book of Music-hall, Variety and Showbiz Anecdotes by Roy Hudd (Paperback – 30 October 1998)
- The Pantomime Book: The Only Known Collection of Pantomime Jokes and Sketches in Captivity by Paul Harris and Roy Hudd (Paperback – 31 October 2001)
- Twice Nightly by Roy Hudd (Hardcover – October 2007)
- The Pantomime Book by Roy Hudd and Paul Harris (Paperback – 15 September 2008)
- A Fart in a Colander: The Autobiography by Roy Hudd (Hardcover – 1 October 2009)

=== Contributor ===
- Hudd, Roy (1979). "Contributor". David Jacob's Book of Celebrities' Jokes & Anecdotes. By Jacobs, David. Robson Books. p. 76. ISBN 0860511251.
