= The Buttercup Chain (novel) =

1967 novel by Janice Elliott

- First edition
- Author: Janice Elliott
- Language: English
- Genre: Drama
- Publisher: Secker & Warburg
- Publication date: 1967
- Publication place: United Kingdom
- Media type: Print

The Buttercup Chain is a 1967 novel by the British writer Janice Elliott.

== Film adaptation ==
In 1970 it was made into a film of the same title produced by Columbia Pictures. Directed by Robert Ellis Miller, it starred Hywel Bennett, Leigh Taylor-Young and Jane Asher.

== Bibliography ==
- Goble, Alan. The Complete Index to Literary Sources in Film. Walter de Gruyter, 1999.
- Todd, Janet. British Women Writers: A Critical Reference Guide. Continuum, 1989.
