= Wembley Point Woman =

Unidentified decedent in London

- Died: October 29, 2004 20-40 years of age London, United Kingdom
- Cause of death: Suicide by jumping from height
- Burial place: Carpenders Park Cemetery, Watford
- Height: 5 ft 1 in (155 cm)

The Wembley Point Woman (c. 1964–1984 – 29 October 2004) is a placeholder name for an unidentified woman found dead in London, United Kingdom on 29 October 2004. The Wembley Point Woman was found in the River Brent at the foot of a high-rise building that was known at the time as Wembley Point. Her death was ruled a suicide. Despite repeated inquiries over two decades, the Wembley Point Woman remains unidentified.

== Background ==
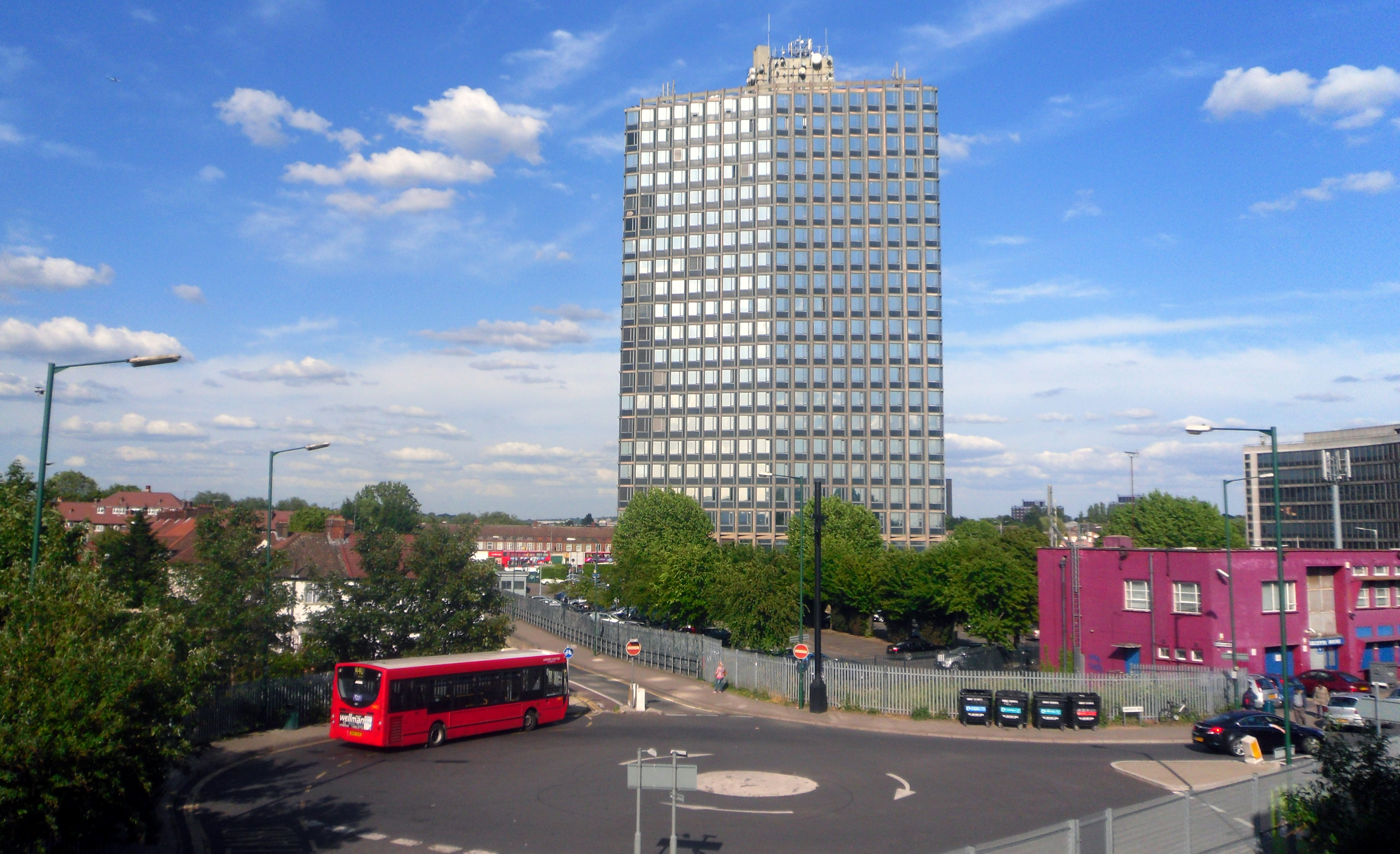
The formerly named Wembley Point tower block, from where the Wembley Point Woman was found.

On the morning of 29 October 2004, a woman's body was found at the base of the Wembley Point tower in London. She was found deceased in the River Brent, lying at the foot of the tower. Witnesses saw her commit suicide by jumping from the building's rooftop cafe, 21 stories above the ground. On the day of her death, the Wembley Point Woman was reportedly looking through The Guardian while smoking a cigarette, when she suddenly leapt on a table, opened a window, and jumped to her death without warning. No one who saw the incident occur could recall her identity or what she was doing there.

=== Description ===
The woman was of Afro-Caribbean descent and would have stood between 5'1" (1.55 m) and 5'3" (1.60 m) when she was alive. She was estimated to be between twenty and forty years of age. She was found wearing a maroon zip-up jacket over two layered jumpers, one black and one claret coloured. She wore a black glove on her left hand, covering a silver ring on her smallest finger. On her right hand, she wore a metal ring in the shape of a cowrie shell.

She wore black tights under her trousers and was wearing Skechers brand boots with a side buckle. In her right ear she had a stud earring. With her, authorities found £5.20 in cash, an opened packet of Marlboros, a copy of The Guardian, and a bus pass issued at 7:07 am on Tuesday, 26 October 2004 at the Seven Sisters Road. Missing from her person was any type of identifying documentation. She did not carry a wallet, bank cards, house keys, nor a phone.

=== Public response ===
After the incident, members of the public reached out to police sharing their recollections of the Wembley Point Woman prior to her death. Witnesses disclosed how they had seen the woman looking "distressed" in the building's lift as well as in the cafe found on the 21st floor of the building. Other witnesses described her moving "confidently" about the building, speculating that the building was known to her or that she had possibly worked there. No concrete evidence was found to definitively tie her to the building. Notably to investigators, it was unclear how the woman knew of the existence of the cafe, as it was used as a worker's canteen, and not known as a public venue.

Police later recovered a distinctive oil painting left by the woman from the cafe where she was sitting. Investigators have been unable to attribute its meaning, or to its provenance.

The Wembley Point Woman was later buried in a common grave in Watford's Carpenders Park Cemetery.

=== Reaction ===
In the two decades since her discovery, the Wembley Point Woman has received regular press attention in the United Kingdom in an effort to learn more about her identity. No leads have been found to lead to reliable information to establish her identity.

In 2021 and 2023, the British police and missing persons groups issued new appeals for information in the case. The case remains unsolved.

== See also ==
- Death of Lamduan Armitage, formerly unidentified decedent found in North Yorkshire in 2004
- List of unsolved deaths
- Unidentified decedent
