= The Buttercup Chain =

1970 British film by Robert Ellis Miller

- Theatrical release lobby card
- Directed by: Robert Ellis Miller
- Written by: Peter Draper
- Based on: The Buttercup Chain by Janice Elliott
- Produced by: Leslie Gilliat; Philip Waddilove; John Whitney
- Starring: Hywel Bennett; Leigh Taylor-Young; Jane Asher
- Cinematography: Douglas Slocombe
- Edited by: Thelma Connell
- Music by: Richard Rodney Bennett
- Production company: Columbia British Productions
- Distributed by: Columbia Pictures
- Release date: 24 September 1970
- Running time: 95 minutes
- Country: United Kingdom
- Language: English

The Buttercup Chain is a 1970 British drama film directed by Robert Ellis Miller and starring Hywel Bennett, Jane Asher, and Leigh Taylor-Young. The screenplay was by Peter Draper, adapted from the 1967 novel of the same title by Janice Elliott.

== Plot ==
France and Margaret are cousins, born on the same day to twin sisters. They grow up feeling a bond as if brother and sister. When he returns to London from boarding school, France and Margaret make a pact in which each finds a suitable romantic partner for the other. But when they go away to the countryside with Manny and Fred, a strange incestuous impulse seems to exist between the cousins, while Manny also must deal with a pregnancy.

== Cast ==
- Hywel Bennett as France
- Leigh Taylor-Young as Manny
- Jane Asher as Margaret
- Sven-Bertil Taube as Fred
- Clive Revill as George
- Roy Dotrice as Martin Carr-Gibbons
- Michael Elphick as the driver
- Jonathan Burn as Alberto
- Yutte Stensgaard as Ullah
- Susan Baker as Kate
- Jennifer Baker as Ursula

== Production ==
The film was shot at Shepperton Studios and on location in England, Sweden and Spain. The film's sets were designed by the veteran art director Wilfred Shingleton.

It was entered into the 1970 Cannes Film Festival.

== Reception ==
Vincent Canby of The New York Times wrote: "(Director) Miller and his screen writer, Peter Draper, avoided any revealing psychological confrontations in favor of making one of those depressingly modish movies in which the sensations created by things like slick photography, beautiful nudes and intrusive soundtrack music become the substance of the film, instead of its context."

The Monthly Film Bulletin wrote: "A romantic fable told with a brisk, confident if somewhat over-emphasised elegance. Content to stay at the intriguing and attractively impressionist level of complexities of motive and emotion that can only be briefly glimpsed or guessed at, The Buttercup Chain even suggests that Robert Ellis Miller has created a spiritual home in some kind of shadow land of Carson McCullers. But the original material does not seem to read that way, and the film suffers from an inexorable sliding apart of style and subject – paradoxically not because it fails to avoid the trite dangers of its romantic fantasy, but because it does not go far enough towards embracing and overcoming them. The various climaxes of Janice Elliott's novel spiral through a succession of landscapes, the cycle of changes both external and within the characters stated so flatly and objectively as to numb any suggestion of cheap romance. But the film simply peters out to its sad-sentimental end in the cold streets of Stockholm."
