= Tropic of Ruislip =

1974 novel by British author Leslie Thomas

- First edition cover
- Author: Leslie Thomas
- Language: English
- Genre: Fiction, Humor, Comedy, British Literature, and Contemporary
- Publisher: Eyre Methuen
- Publication date: October 17, 1974
- Pages: 286
- ISBN: 9780413451408

Tropic of Ruislip is a 1974 novel by British author Leslie Thomas. It explores the British class divide and themes such as wife swapping. The title refers to Ruislip, one of London's outer suburbs, but the book is set in another suburb, Carpenders Park.

The book sold well, although Thomas' later work never matched the success of his first novel, The Virgin Soldiers, published in 1966.

== Setting ==
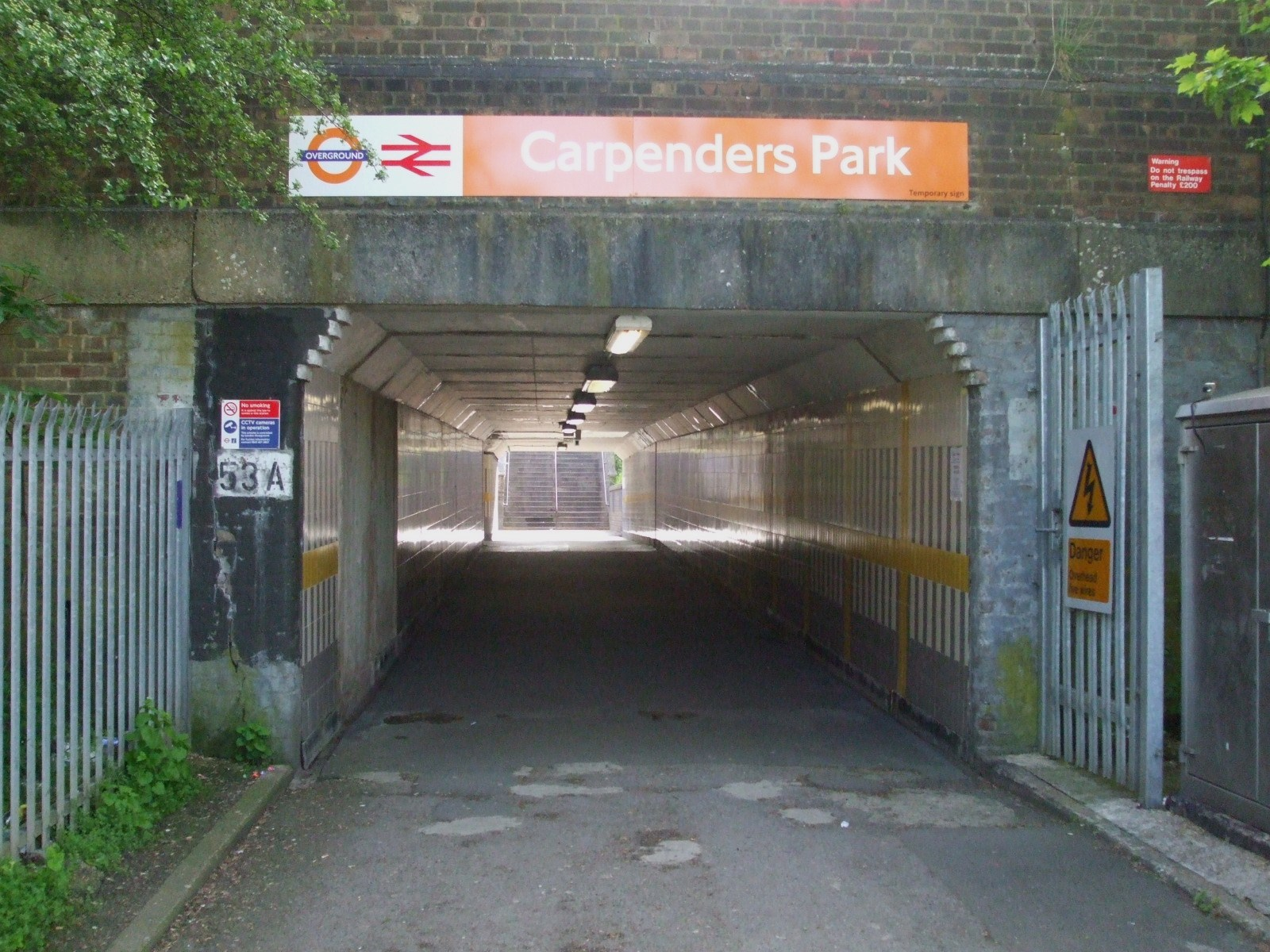
Subway under the railway tracks (Watford DC line and West Coast Main Line). In the book the railway marks a social divide.

The book is set in the suburbs of London, specifically "Plummers Park", which is apparently a fictional version of Carpenders Park, where the author lived in the 1960s. Carpenders Park railway station is on a commuter railway line. In the book, a railway line marks the division between a council estate and middle class housing, mirroring to some extent the real-life division between Carpenders Park and South Oxhey.

Other locations in the book include Watford, where the male protagonist Andrew is employed by a local newspaper.

== Adaptation ==
It was adapted for television in 1979 as "Tropic" with a cast including Ronald Pickup.
