= Death of Lamduan Armitage =

Death of formerly unidentified woman

Lamduan Armitage
- ลำดวน อาร์มิเทจ
- Born: Lamduan Seekanya ลำดวน สีกันยา; 1968; Udon Thani Province, Thailand
- Died: 2004 (aged 35–36); Pen-y-ghent, North Yorkshire, England
- Known for: Mysterious circumstances of her death
- Spouse: David Armitage (m. 1991)

Lamduan Armitage (née Seekanya) was a formerly unidentified woman whose body was discovered in 2004 on Pen-y-ghent, a mountain in North Yorkshire, England, leading her to become known as the Lady of the Hills. The woman was found to have come from somewhere in South-East Asia, but despite an international police investigation, her identity and how she arrived at the location remained a mystery until 2019. The woman was identified in March 2019 through DNA testing.

Her husband, David Armitage, was arrested in the United Kingdom on 2 February 2025 on suspicion of her murder.

== Discovery ==
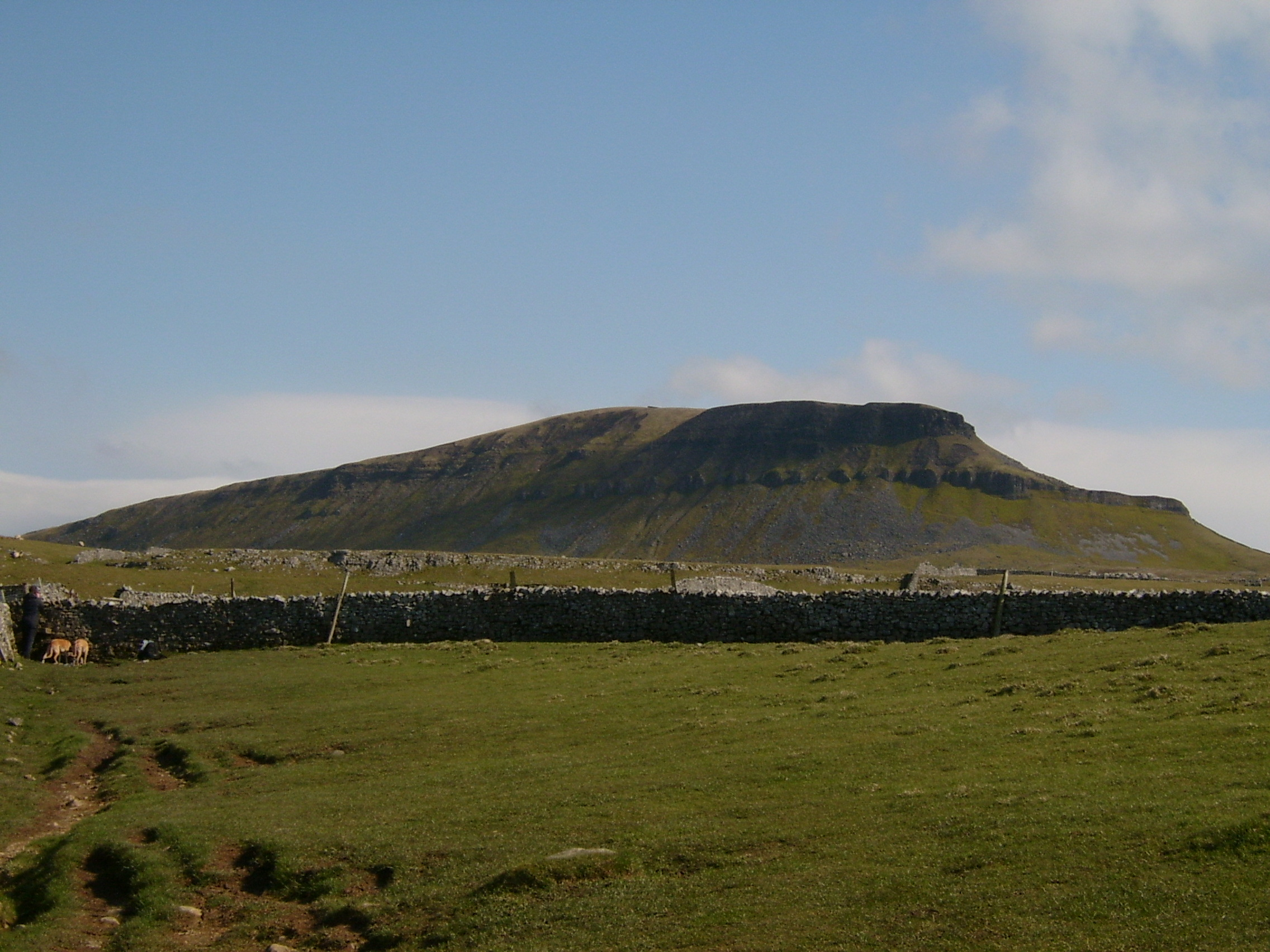
Pen-y-ghent

On Monday 20 September 2004 at 11:30 am, a man walking in the vicinity of Pen-y-ghent alerted the police to the discovery of the body of a dead woman. The man had discovered the body in a well-trafficked location on the Pennine Way between Pen-y-ghent and Horton in Ribblesdale in Sell Gill Beck stream, which flows into the cave Sell Gill Hole. It was thought that the body had been in the stream for some time, and that the woman could have died up to three weeks before the discovery. The cause of death was not initially apparent, and no signs of violence were reported.

== Description ==
The woman was believed to be of southeast-Asian origin, had dark, shoulder-length hair, and was about 4 feet 11 inches (1.50 m) tall. Her age was estimated between 25 and 35 years. The woman had healthy teeth with a noticeable gap at the front. Her body was clothed in green jeans and a green-and-white-striped T-shirt; she also wore a wedding ring. The ring was 22-carat gold and made in Bangkok, Thailand. The woman had pierced ears, but no earrings were found. No shoes, warm outer clothing, or other personal effects were found at the site. The woman weighed 10 stone (64 kg) but appeared to have gained weight in the years prior to her death.

== Investigation ==
=== Initial investigation ===
Immediately after the discovery, North Yorkshire Police commenced an extensive investigation. Police questioned walkers using the Pennine Way, conducted house-to-house enquires in the locality, and issued letters to local holiday accommodations that appealed for witnesses in multiple languages. Police investigated every sighting in the Yorkshire Dales of women matching the description of the unidentified body dating back to 1 August 2004.

A postmortem examination suggested that the woman had died between 31 August and 13 September. It did not provide enough information to enable investigators to establish the cause of death. but indicated that the woman had probably been pregnant at some point during her life.

Detective Chief Inspector Pete Martin stated that the death was unexplained death rather than suspicious. A search of missing persons databases did not produce any matches.

A number of countries were identified as the potential origin of the woman, including Malaysia, Indonesia, Singapore, Thailand, and Vietnam. Analysis of the body indicated that the woman had been in the UK for at least two years prior to her death and that she had probably lived in Cumbria, Lancashire, or the west Yorkshire Dales.

=== Subsequent investigations ===
In December 2004 the police produced an e-fit photograph of the woman, which was issued to the embassies of a number of Asian countries. At this time it was believed that the woman could have originated from the Philippines, China, or Korea. No meaningful response was received from this appeal.

In February 2005 an appeal was made on the BBC programme Crimewatch.

In May 2007 the inquest heard that the investigation found no evidence of trauma, assault, or drowning, and it recorded an open verdict.

In 2011 the police announced that they were reopening the investigation of eight unsolved deaths. The Lady of the Hills was one of these cases, along with the Sutton Bank body.

Dr. Wolfram Meier-Augenstein was involved in the investigation and his interpretation of stable isotopic signatures obtained from the victim's remains corroborated one line of investigation that the victim might have grown up in Thailand. In 2018 an appeal was subsequently made by the North Yorkshire Police. The appeal was made on Facebook in the Filipino, Thai, and English languages so that the messages could be shared internationally.

=== Identification ===
On 22 January 2019, a family in Thailand came forward in the belief that they knew the identity of the victim. The woman had married a British man in 1991 and moved to North West England in 1995. The mother of the woman had not heard from her daughter since 2004.

On 19 March 2019, North Yorkshire Police revealed that they had identified the body, following DNA testing as Lamduan Armitage (née Seekanya). Armitage was married to British lecturer David Armitage, her second husband, in Thailand and moved to Portsmouth in 1991. David Armitage was located in 2019 and denied any involvement in his wife's death. The cause of death remains unknown, but murder has not been ruled out.

In February 2023, British police travelled to Thailand to further their investigation. They had wanted to interview David Armitage, but he refused to speak to them.

== Arrest of David Armitage ==
David Armitage was first arrested on 23 January 2025 by Thai authorities at his residence in Kanchanaburi province, Thailand, in connection with her death. He was then detained in Bangkok pending visa revocation proceedings. His arrest came after an international letter of request from the UK.

On 25 January, the North Yorkshire Police released a statement saying that upon his deportation, he will have a choice of going anywhere, including return to the UK, and if he returns to the UK, the force will "make every effort to speak to him about the investigation".

He returned to the UK on 2 February and was arrested by police upon his arrival at Heathrow Airport. The North Yorkshire Police stated that the "61-year-old man has been arrested on suspicion of the murder of Lamduan Armitage in 2004". He is currently on conditional bail, pending further enquiries.

== See also ==
- Wembley Point Woman, unidentified decedent from London in 2004
- List of solved missing person cases (post-2000)
- List of unsolved deaths
