= Endless Night (1972 film) =

1972 British film by Sidney Gilliat

- Theatrical release poster
- Directed by: Sidney Gilliat
- Screenplay by: Sidney Gilliat
- Based on: Endless Night by Agatha Christie
- Produced by: Leslie Gilliat
- Starring: Hayley Mills; Hywel Bennett; Britt Ekland; George Sanders; Per Oscarsson
- Cinematography: Harry Waxman
- Edited by: Thelma Connell
- Music by: Bernard Herrmann
- Production companies: British Lion Films; EMI Films; National Film Trustee Company
- Distributed by: British Lion Films (British Isles); EMI Films (worldwide)
- Release date: 5 October 1972 (UK)
- Running time: 95 minutes
- Country: United Kingdom
- Language: English
- Budget: £250,197
- Box office: £345,269

Endless Night (also known as Agatha Christie's Endless Night) is a 1972 British neo-noir horror-mystery film directed by Sidney Gilliat and starring Hayley Mills, Britt Ekland, Per Oscarsson, Hywel Bennett, and George Sanders. Based on the 1967 novel Endless Night by Agatha Christie, the plot follows a newlywed couple who feel threatened after building their dream home on cursed land.

This was the last project on which Sidney Gilliat and Frank Launder worked together for British Lion Films, their home since The Happiest Days of Your Life (1950).

== Plot ==
Michael Rogers is a wistful and aimless young aspiring photographer working as a chauffeur and living with his mother in London. From a working class background, Michael aspires to a life of luxury and is obsessed with the fine arts. Through his travels as a chauffeur, he discovers a spot along the Devon coast known as Gypsy's Acre, where a dilapidated Victorian mansion sits. Michael fantasizes about one day building a new home on the plot of land and aims to one day have Santonix, a famed Italian architect whom he met through a client, design the home.

While photographing Gypsy's Acre, Michael meets Ellie Thomsen, a young American visiting England, who is quickly taken by Michael's fantastical nature. While exploring the property, the two encounter Miss Townsend, a mysterious old woman who tells Michael that Gypsy's Acre is for sale, but that it is a cursed land. Ellie leaves England and embarks on the remainder of her trip through Switzerland and Italy with Greta, her German language tutor who has taken on the role of a personal assistant. In Ellie's absence, Michael learns that she is in fact one of the richest young women in the world. He confronts her about this when she returns to England, but she explains she did not want to tell him as she thought it would dissuade him from pursuing her. She also reveals that, while visiting Italy, she was able to arrange a meeting with Santonix about building Michael's dream home. Furthermore, she reveals she has purchased Gypsy's Acre.

Though initially angered by her deceit, Michael eventually relents, and he and Ellie marry in Wales. Ellie attempts to keep the marriage secret, as she fears her stepmother, Cora, and other family members may attempt to bribe Michael to divorce her based on his lower social class, but the union quickly makes international headlines. The family's attorney, whom Ellie lovingly refers to as "Uncle" Andrew swiftly attempts to buy Michael off, but he declines, insisting he and Ellie are in love. The couple subsequently purchases a local antique shop to operate.

As construction of the home begins, Greta arrives, announcing she has taken a secretarial job in London and begins to slowly infiltrate the couple's new life together. Ellie welcomes of her presence, but Michael dislikes her. Frank and the other family members approach Greta with similar scepticism, and wish to distance her from Ellie. At the house, Ellie becomes unnerved when she notices Miss Townsend staring at the home from the fields below for hours at a time. While Michael attends an auction in the city, Ellie goes missing while out riding her horse. Her body is subsequently found in the woods on Gypsy's Acre. An autopsy suggests she died of unexpected cardiac arrest, but Michael contests this during the inquest, believing there may have been foul play. The police attempt to trace Miss Townsend but are unable to locate her. After the inquest, Andrew notifies Michael that Ellie made him the sole beneficiary of her estate, and urges Michael to travel to the United States to tend to Ellie's business dealings there. Santonix, meanwhile, dies after a protracted battle with cancer.

Upon returning to Gypsy's Acre from the United States, Michael witnesses an apparition of Ellie as he approaches the house. Upon entering, he and Greta embrace romantically, and begin to have sex—it is revealed the two lovers had conspired all along, preying on Ellie to take her estate: Greta killed her by lacing her allergy medicine with cyanide and bee venom, which stopped her heart. Michael and Greta's plans of a lavish life together are swiftly interrupted, however, when they receive an envelope postmarked from New York City—sent by Andrew—containing date-stamped photographs of them together long before Michael had met Ellie, serving as evidence of their conspiracy. Michael violently lashes out against Greta, blaming her for their predicament, and murders her in the swimming pool. This triggers a memory from Michael's childhood, in which he killed his schoolmate by pushing him into a frozen pond and stealing his watch as a memento.

Michael is interviewed by police and Dr. Philpott, a local psychologist, and admits to helping murder Ellie. Philpott questions him about Miss Townsend, whom he presumes was paid to frighten Ellie, and then killed by Michael afterwards to prevent her from exposing the plot; Michael, however, insists Miss Townsend never existed. As they question him further, Michael suffers a nervous breakdown, haunted by images related to those he has killed.

== Cast ==
- Hayley Mills as Fenella 'Ellie' Thomsen
- Hywel Bennett as Michael Rogers
- Britt Ekland as Greta
- Per Oscarsson as Santonix
- George Sanders as Andrew Lippincott
- David Bauer as Uncle Frank
- Peter Bowles as Reuben Brown
- Patience Collier as Miss Townsend
- Windsor Davies as Sergeant Reene
- Mischa de la Motte as Maynard
- Helen Horton as Aunt Beth
- Lois Maxwell as Cora Walker-Brown
- Aubrey Richards as Dr. Philpott
- Ann Way as Mrs. Philpott
- Paul Boross as young Michael
- Leo Genn as psychiatrist
- Madge Ryan as Michael's mother

== Production ==
=== Development ===
The novel was published in 1967. Christie later said she normally wrote her books in three to four months but Endless Night was done in six weeks.

Launder and Gilliat had spent two years working on a comedy about British divorce, Sex and the British. However, they had to shelve it when a change in British law meant the plot became obsolete. Instead, they decided to adapt the Agatha Christie novel, with Gilliat to direct and Launder to produce. Their aim was to write a cinematic script with a minimum of dialogue and a deliberate ambiguity of style "in the sense you're never really sure what is being said is what is really meant or really being said." The film was eventually produced by Gilliat's brother Leslie.

The film was partly financed by money from the National Film Trustee Company and from EMI Films.

=== Filming ===
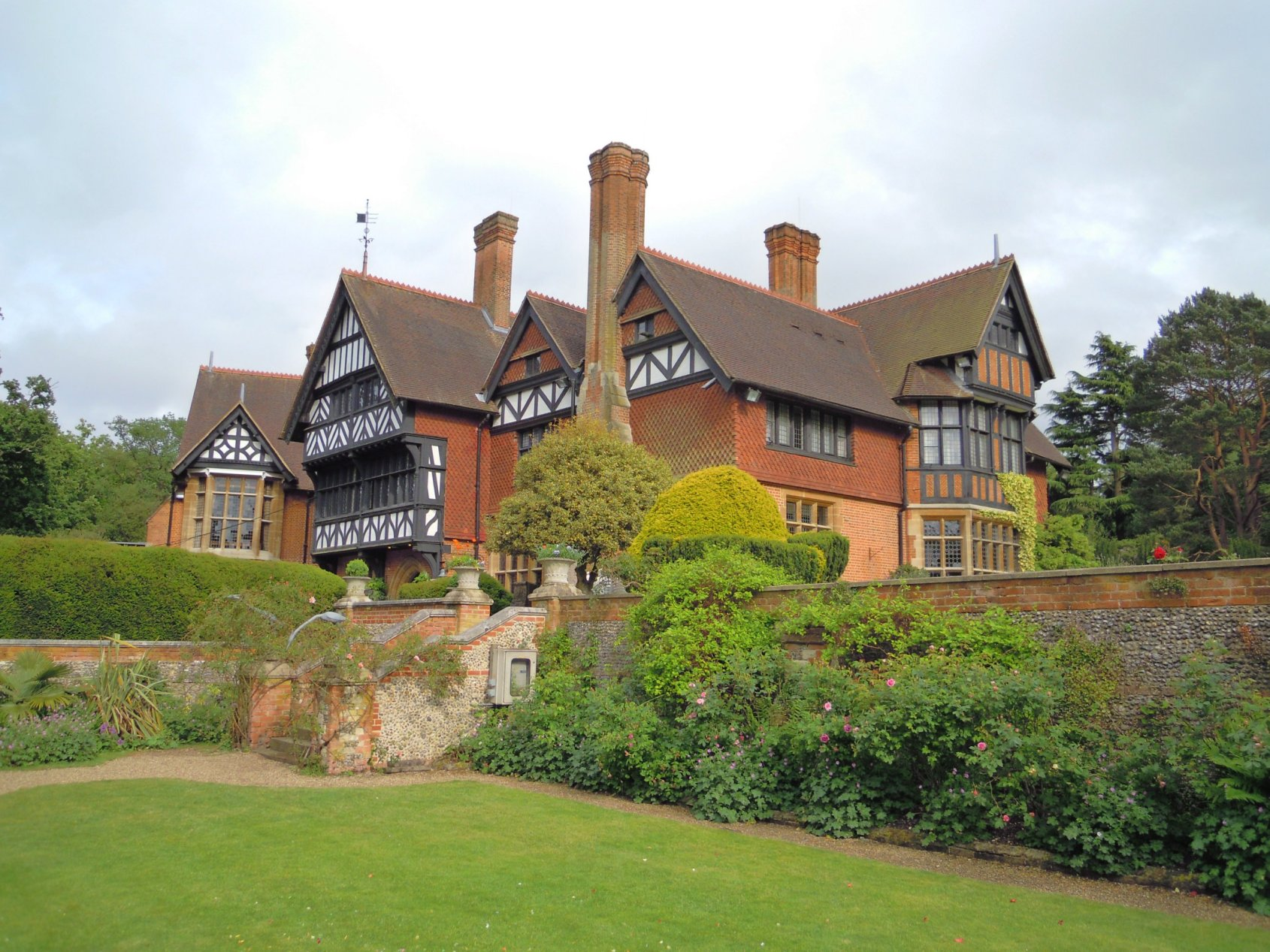
Grim's Dyke

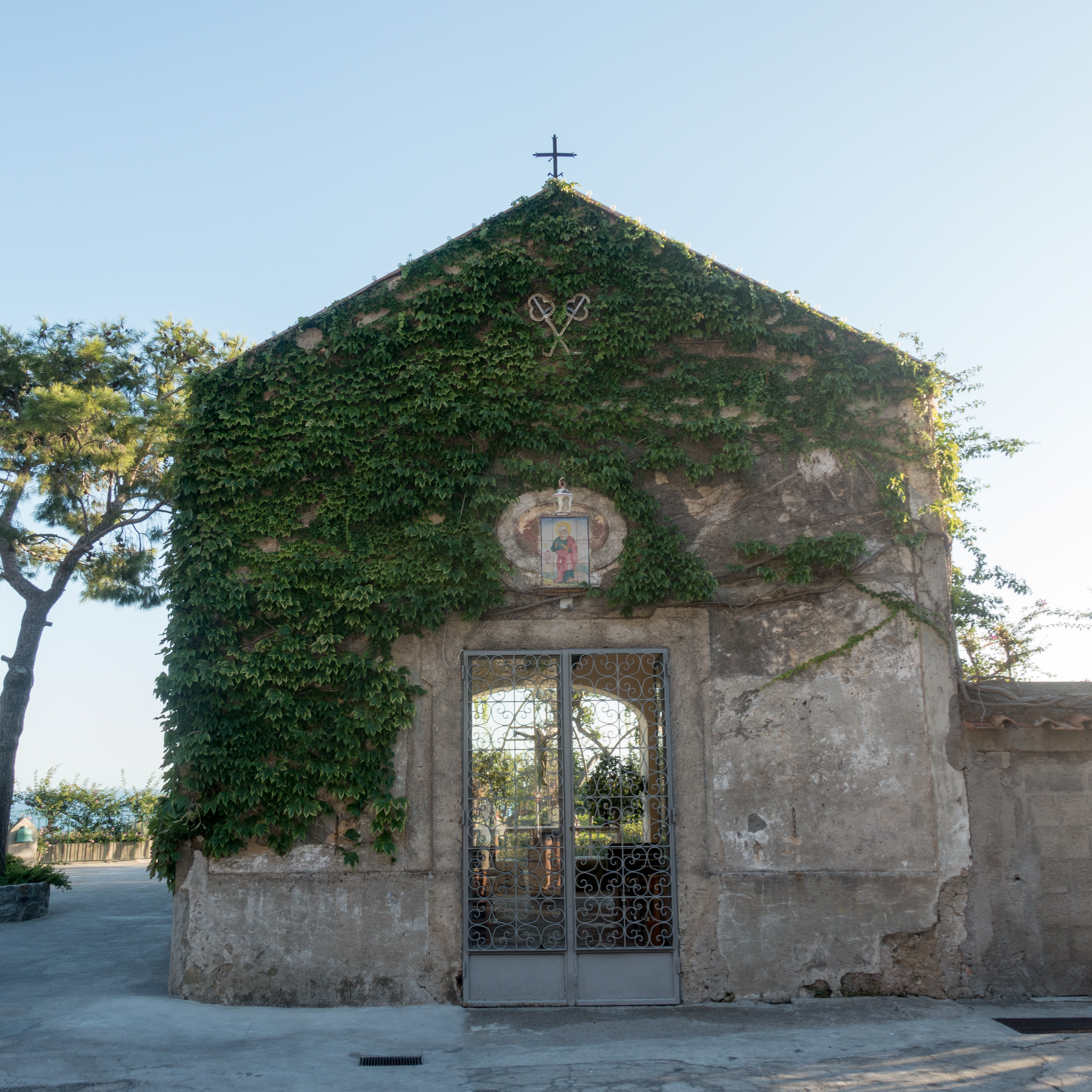
Entrance of Il San Pietro di Positano

Filming took place in June 1971. Shooting locations included Christie's Auction House in London, as well as the West Country and Il San Pietro di Positano, Positano, Italy. The estate of Mike and Ellie's neighbours, the Philpotts, was filmed at Grim's Dyke.

Gilliat later said, "I felt very rusty getting back on the set and I had a perfectly horrible time- funnily enough back at my very first studio."

=== Musical score ===
The score was composed by American composer Bernard Herrmann. Commenting on the experience, Herrmann recounted: "I like to work on a film from the very beginning, but very few producers or directors think of that. They bring you in when the picture is near its final cut and they want you to do it within a very short time—always the least amount of time in which you can possibly do it. Endless Night is an exception... Sidney Gilliat is a very experienced director who understands the problems, and he asked me to talk with him and consider what we should do musically at a very early stage." Herrmann initially intended to implement a theremin in the score, but instead opted for a Moog synthesizer. Ellie's singing in the film was dubbed by Shirley Jones.

== Reception ==
The film received mixed reviews. Although reasonably faithful to the novel, it is "An example of the sort of thing Christie was writing in her later years: moody psychological studies very different from, and not so much fun as, her early thrillers." Contemporary critics have noted "Nice performances all around, with special admiration for Oscarsson's role as the dying architect." Another review said "It's not a bad movie, with a decent story and cast, but lacks flair; Gilliat – who has a fine CV – had not directed for ten years and you can tell."

Christie was initially pleased with the involvement of Gilliat and the casting of the film. However, upon seeing the film, she "was very disappointed... It got flatter and less interesting every minute." Furthermore, she disliked the (admittedly brief) erotic nudity by Ekland in the film's final sequences.

The initial release in Britain was unsuccessful, and United Artists decided against releasing the film in the United States. However, the film was released in both Denmark and Finland in 1973.

== See also ==
- Grim's Dyke

== Sources ==
- Boorman, John; Donohue, Walter (1993). Projections: A Forum for Film-makers. New York City, New York: Faber and Faber.
- Haining, Peter (1990). Agatha Christie: Murder in Four Acts. London, England: Virgin Books. ISBN 1-85227-273-2.
- Smith, Steven C. (2002). A Heart at Fire's Center: The Life and Music of Bernard Herrmann. Berkeley, California: University of California Press. ISBN 978-0-520-92723-0.
