= Carpenders Park =

Coordinates: 51.628°N 0.384°W

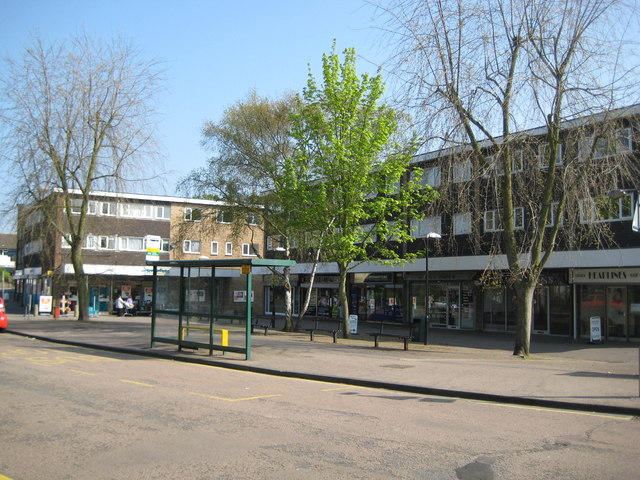

- Location within Hertfordshire
- Population: 4,861 (2011 Census. Ward)
- OS grid reference: TQ119934
- District: Three Rivers
- Shire county: Hertfordshire
- Region: East
- Country: England
- Sovereign state: United Kingdom
- Post town: WATFORD
- Postcode district: WD19
- Post town: Watford
- Postcode district: Wd19
- Dialling code: 020
- Police: Hertfordshire
- Fire: Hertfordshire
- Ambulance: East of England
- UK Parliament: Watford

Carpenders Park is a suburb of Watford in the Watford Rural parish of the Three Rivers district of Hertfordshire, England. It is located in the south western corner of Hertfordshire and close to the boundary with Greater London.

It is bounded on the west by the railway line that separates it from South Oxhey; on the east by the A4008 Watford to Harrow Road (Oxhey Lane), to the south by the B4542 (Little Oxhey Lane), green belt and the boundary with the London Borough of Harrow and to the north by woodland (Margeholes Wood and Sherwood Wood) leading to Oxhey Village.

== History ==
Carpenders Park was originally an estate based around a manor house of the same name. This was later a girls school, Highfields, which was demolished in 1960 to make way for USAF married quarters. These were in turn demolished in 1997/98. The base was also known as Highfields.

The houses and bungalows of Carpenders Park were originally built in the 1930s. There was subsequent development in the 1950s including some council housing built for the Watford Rural District Council. The vast majority of the dwellings, though, are privately owned.

The estate was significantly enlarged in the late 1960s. Many of these later houses have flat roofs. The area gained some notoriety as the fictional Plummers Park, the setting for Leslie Thomas' 1970s novel Tropic of Ruislip, which had wife swapping as one of its themes.

== Local facilities ==
- Carpenders Park railway station
- Attenborough Doctors' Surgery, Harrow Way
- Carpenders Park Community Hall, next to the station
- Post office and shops on Delta Gain
- Fish & chip shop

Other facilities may be found in South Oxhey.

== Carpenders Park Cemetery ==
Carpenders Park Lawn Cemetery is owned and operated by the London Borough of Brent. It was opened in 1954.

The Hartsbourne stream meanders through fourteen acres of mature woodland - the key feature of the cemetery - and there is a small lake.

Brent has provided an area in the cemetery for the Muslim community since 1980.

The cemetery is a lawn type cemetery which means there are no upright memorials allowed, only approved bronze resin plaques set into the ground.

== Education ==
- St Meryl Primary School (the name is derived from that of the wife of the builder, not from any religious affiliation)
- Woodhall School (in South Oxhey but serves the area)
- There are no secondary schools; the nearest are located in nearby Bushey.

== Religion ==
- Carpenders Park Spiritualist Church
- Carpenders Park Church
- Carpenders Park is in the Church of England Parish of All Saints', Oxhey and is served by the Parish Church of All Saints' in neighbouring South Oxhey.
