= One for the Road (2003 film) =

- Directed by: Chris Cooke
- Written by: Chris Cooke
- Produced by: Peter Carlton; Robin Gutch; Alexander O'Neal; Kate Ogborn; Helen Solomon; Paul Trijbits
- Starring: Hywel Bennett; Gregory Chisholm; Mark Devenport; Rupert Procter
- Cinematography: Nick Gordon Smith
- Edited by: Nick Fenton
- Music by: Steve Blackman
- Production companies: EM Media; Emmi (East Midlands Media Investments); Film4 Productions; International Film & Video; One for the Road Films; Strange Dog Productions; UK Film Council
- Distributed by: Palisades Tartan
- Release dates: 21 August 2003 (Edinburgh International Film Festival); 2 July 2004 (UK)
- Running time: 94 min.
- Country: United Kingdom
- Language: English

One for the Road is a 2003 British comedy-drama film written and directed by Chris Cooke. Filmed on location in and around Nottinghamshire, the film stars Hywel Bennett, Gregory Chisholm, Mark Devenport, and Rupert Procter as four men who meet at a compulsory rehabilitation class after being sentenced for drink driving.

The film was nominated for the Michael Powell Award for Best New British Feature Film at the 2003 Edinburgh International Film Festival and for the Golden Hitchcock Award at the 2003 Dinard Festival of British Film.

== Cast ==
- Rupert Procter as Paul
- Gregory Chisholm (billed as Greg Chisholm) as Jimmy
- Mark Devenport as Mark
- Hywel Bennett as Richard Stevens
- Julie Legrand as Liz
- Micaiah Dring as Eve
