= Leslie Gilliat =

British film producer and production manager (1917–2013))

- Born: 29 May 1917; New Malden, Surrey, England
- Died: 13 July 2013 (aged 96); Winchester, Hampshire, England
- Occupation: Producer

Leslie Gilliat (29 May 1917 – 13 July 2013) was a British film producer and production manager. He was the younger brother of director Sidney Gilliat, with whom he worked on a number of films for British Lion Films.

== Selected filmography ==
- The Blue Lagoon (1949)
- Left Right and Centre (1959)
- Only Two Can Play (1962)
- The Amorous Prawn (1962)
- Two Left Feet (1963)
- Ring of Spies (1964)
- The Great St Trinian's Train Robbery (1966)
- The Virgin Soldiers (1969)
- The Buttercup Chain (1970)
- Endless Night (1972)

== Bibliography ==
- Bruce Babington. Launder and Gilliat. Manchester University Press, 2002
