= The Quest (British TV series) =

British television series

The Quest is a series of three feature-length comedy dramas produced by Yorkshire Television and written for British television by Douglas Livingstone and directed by David Jason. The series revolves around three older men (played by Jason, Hywel Bennett and Roy Hudd) trying to relive their youth. Other members of the cast included Les Dennis, Anna Karen, Diane Langton and Georgia Tennant.

The first episode in the series premiered on ITV in 2002. Two follow-up episodes were also created by Livingstone and Jason: The Second Quest and The Final Quest (both 2004).
