= Dangerous Davies =

"Dangerous" Davies
- First appearance: Dangerous Davies: The Last Detective
- Last appearance: Dangerous Davies and the Lonely Heart
- Created by: Leslie Thomas
- Portrayed by: Bernard Cribbins; Peter Davison

In-universe information
- Gender: Male
- Title: Detective Constable
- Occupation: Police officer
- Nationality: British

Detective Constable "Dangerous" Davies is the central character in a series of comic detective novels by Leslie Thomas and a TV series, The Last Detective made for ITV and starring Peter Davison. The first novel in the series had earlier been made into a film for television in 1981. It starred Bernard Cribbins and was scripted by Leslie Thomas.

== Profile ==
Davies is a low-ranked CID (mentioned as a detective constable at least once) officer in the London borough of Willesden. He is nicknamed "Dangerous" ironically because he is said to be harmless. His real first name is never revealed. In the novels and TV series he is called "The Last Detective" from his superior's assessment of him as "the last detective, since he was never dispatched on any assignment unless it was very risky or there was no one else to send". Despite this, Davies is by no means a poor detective, and although he can take longer than his colleagues, and is dogged by bad luck, he does usually "get his man" in the end.

The first story had him drifting into the years-old unsolved case of the disappearance of Celia Norris, a local girl with a dark side. With his friend, the perpetually unemployed and well-read Mod Lewis (he spends all his time at the library to save on heating) he tracks down the culprit, collecting plenty of cuts, bumps and bruises along the way at the hands of the local thugs. At one point he is "binned" — an empty dustbin is placed over his head, pinning his arms, and the outside is then hit with pickaxe handles. He also is the object of attention of Josie Norris, Celia's sister born after Celia disappeared. Josie is in her late teens (17), ready to rebel against her over-protective mother and test her budding sexuality with Davies. The case breaks when Davies finds a confession, sent by registered mail to establish its origins, and unopened since it was sent, that implicates a prominent local figure.

Bernard Cribbins played Davies in the first television version of this story, made in 1981. At the end he was swathed in many bandages and temporarily used a wheelchair. In his later appearances he has been portrayed by Peter Davison from 2003 to 2007.

Much of the appeal of the books and TV series lies in the comical interactions between Davies and the other characters. His kindly manner enables him to gain the confidence of witnesses and suspects, many of whom reveal their eccentricities to him. Other humour comes from his friendship with Mod, and from his relationship with his estranged wife Doris (Julie in the TV series).

== List of novels ==
- Dangerous Davies: The Last Detective (1976)
- Dangerous in Love (1987)
- Dangerous by Moonlight (1993)
- Dangerous Davies and the Lonely Heart (1998)

== Adaptations ==
=== Film ===
==== Selected credits ====
- Bernard Cribbins as DC "Dangerous" Davies
- Bill Maynard as Mod Lewis
- Joss Ackland as Chief Inspector Yardbird
- Bernard Lee as Sergeant Ben (Lee's final role before his death)
- John Leyton as Dave Boot
- Maureen Lipman as Ena Lind
- Cindy O'Callaghan as Josie Norris
- Frank Windsor as Fred Fennell
- Patsy Rowlands as Madame Tarentella
- Derek Bond as Det Supt Carter
- Colin Baker as William Lind
- Norman Chappell as Parsons
- Jeremy Sinden as Det Sgt Green
- Ken Jones as Mr Norris
- Pam St. Clement as Mrs Norris
- Directed by Val Guest
- Written by Val Guest and Leslie Thomas

==== Home media ====
This production is available on DVD, distributed by Acorn Media UK.

=== TV series ===
The ITV drama series aired between 2003 and 2007, and comprised 17 episodes of 70 (later 90) minutes. It starred Peter Davison as the title character.

==== Recurring cast ====
- Peter Davison as DC "Dangerous" Davies
- Sean Hughes as Mod
- Emma Amos as Julie Davies
- Rob Spendlove as DI Aspinall
- Charles De'Ath as DS Pimlott
- Billy Geraghty as DC Barrett
