= The Virgin Soldiers (film) =

1969 British film by John Dexter

- British quad poster by John Stockle
- Directed by: John Dexter
- Written by: John Hopkins; John McGrath; Ian La Frenais
- Based on: The Virgin Soldiers by Leslie Thomas
- Produced by: Leslie Gilliat; Ned Sherrin
- Starring: Lynn Redgrave; Hywel Bennett; Nigel Davenport; Nigel Patrick
- Cinematography: Kenneth Higgins
- Edited by: Thelma Connell
- Music by: Peter Greenwell
- Production companies: High Road Productions; Open Road Films
- Distributed by: Columbia Pictures
- Release dates: 15 October 1969 (London); 5 February 1970 (New York City)
- Running time: 95 minutes
- Country: United Kingdom
- Language: English

The Virgin Soldiers is a 1969 British war comedy-drama film directed by John Dexter and starring Lynn Redgrave, Hywel Bennett, Nigel Davenport, Nigel Patrick and Rachel Kempson. It is set in 1950, during the Malayan Emergency, and is based on the 1966 novel of the same name by Leslie Thomas.

In the film's 1977 sequel, Stand Up, Virgin Soldiers Nigel Davenport repeated his role as Sgt Driscoll.

== Premise ==
Private Brigg is a soldier sent to Singapore during the Malayan Emergency along with a squad of naïve new recruits. There he falls for Phillipa Raskin, the daughter of the regimental sergeant major.

== Cast ==
- Lynn Redgrave as Phillipa Raskin
- Hywel Bennett as Pte Brigg
- Nigel Davenport as Sgt Driscoll
- Nigel Patrick as R.S.M. Raskin
- Rachel Kempson as Mrs. Raskin
- Jack Shepherd as Sgt Wellbeloved
- Michael Gwynn as Col Bromley-Pickering
- Tsai Chin as Juicy Lucy
- Christopher Timothy as Cpl Brook
- Don Hawkins as Tasker
- Geoffrey Hughes as Lantry
- Roy Holder as Fenwick
- Riggs O'Hara as Sinclair
- Gregory Phillips as Foster
- Peter Kelly as Sandy Jacobs
- Mark Nicholl as Cutler
- Alan Shatsman as Longley
- Jonty Miller as Forsyth
- Jolyon Jackley as Cpl Gravy Browning
- Wayne Sleep as Villiers
- Robert Bridges as Sgt Fred Organ
- James Cosmo as Waller
- Graham Crowden as medical officer
- Dudley Jones as doctor
- Matthew Guinness as Major Cusper
- Naranjan Singh as sikh
- F Yew as 'Hallelujah'
- Brenda Bruce as nursing sister (uncredited)
- Warren Clarke as soldier (uncredited)
- Barbara Keogh as WRAC (uncredited)
- James Marcus as soldier (uncredited)
- Jeremy Roughton as soldier (uncredited)

A young and uncredited David Bowie appears briefly as a soldier escorted out from behind a bar.

== Production ==
Film rights to the novel were bought by Carl Foreman, who had a production unit at Columbia. Foreman was busy making Mackenna's Gold so he assigned the job of producing to Ned Sherrin, with Leslie Gilliatt as co producer. Leslie Thomas wrote the first script but Sherrin felt it did not do justice to the novel so Joseph McGrath was hired. This version was not well received so John Hopkins wrote a new draft. Ian Le Frenais was called in to do some additional work. Filming took place in 1968.

== Reception ==
=== Box office ===
The Virgin Soldiers was the 17th-most-popular film at the UK box office in 1969. However it performed poorly in the US.

=== Critical ===
The Monthly Film Bulletin wrote: "The Virgin Soldiers remains firmly rooted in the tradition of British Forces Comedy. The jokes, which make up most of the script, revolve round the obvious bawdy themes of service life, and the sexual encounters are presented in what is almost a Carry On fashion ... All this is made even more surprising by the occasional lapses into a tone of portentous seriousness. ... It may be unreasonable to expect of John Hopkins (scripting from an adaptation, with 'additional dialogue' to boot) that his screenplay should have attained the same level of prickly intensity which is present in so much of his television work, but one hardly anticipated that he would turn out something as utterly conventional as this. There are some lively performances, especially from Lynn Redgrave, and the atmosphere seems authentic enough; but overall it is difficult not to feel that The Virgin Soldiers is really nothing more than a kind of monstrous mating of [1956] and The Family Way [1966 ]with a bit of The Long and the Short and the Tall (1961) thrown in for foul measure."

Producer Ned Sherrin later established his own company, called Virgin Films.
