= Tickets for the Titanic =

British television anthology series

Tickets for the Titanic is a British anthology series of television plays, transmitted on Channel 4, that ran for two three-episode seasons in 1987 and 1988. The title came from the concept of Britain in the mid/late-1980s being a sinking ship. The series was produced by William G Stewart, and made by his company, Regent Productions.

== Title sequence ==
Although the overall title was used for both seasons, only the very first episode carried the series title sequence, with a metaphorical theme tune about the sinking of the Titanic, which included lyrics such as: "Send the lifeboats out to sea, we've only got a few. Let the women and children drown, man, we've got to save the crew."

Two days after the first episode was shown, the British cross-Channel ferry Herald of Free Enterprise capsized with the loss of 193 passengers and crew. As a result, Channel 4 dropped the title sequence from the second and third episodes, and it was not used at all in the second season.

== Episodes ==
Series 1:

- "Keeping Score" by Guy Jenkin, directed by William G Stewart

Two social misfits (Tessa Peake-Jones and Martyn Hesford) team together to get revenge on everyone who has crossed them in the past; Charles Gray appeared as Peake-Jones's father, the Tottenham Hotspur-supporting Earl of Albany.

- "The Way, the Truth, The Video"

Peter Firth as an evangelical anti-filth campaigner; with Ian Bannen as a corrupt police officer.

- "Checkpoint Chiswick" by Andy Hamilton, directed by Cyril Coke

Hywel Bennett steadily turns his suburban home into a virtual fortress.

Series 2:

- "Pastoral Care" by Andy Hamilton, directed by Roger Bamford

A naive and innocent vicar (Tony Robinson) is posted to a parish near a Greenham Common-esque American/nuclear airbase, and falls foul of both the conservative locals and the security services.

- "Incident on the Line" by Alastair Beaton, directed by William G Stewart

A young woman (Alexandra Pigg) stops a much older man (Warren Mitchell) from committing suicide at a railway station, and he moves into her squat with her.

- "Everyone a Winner" by Barry Pilton, directed by Paul Joyce

A vicar (Jonathan Pryce) and his family struggle in a future in which Thatcherism has reached its logical conclusions.
