= The Last Detective =

TV series (2003–2007)

- Genre: Crime drama Comedy drama
- Created by: Leslie Thomas
- Written by: Richard Harris
- Starring: Peter Davison; Sean Hughes; Emma Amos; Rob Spendlove; Charles De'Ath; Vineeta Rishi; Elizabeth Bennett
- Composers: Rupert Gregson-Williams; Alastair King
- Country of origin: United Kingdom
- Original language: English
- No. of series: 4
- No. of episodes: 17

Production
- Executive producers: Michelle Buck; Tim Vaughan; Damien Timmer; Aviyan Bahri
- Producers: Nick Hurran; Robbie Sandison; Deirdre Keir
- Running time: 90 minutes (Series 1—3); 120 minutes (Series 4)
- Production companies: Meridian Broadcasting (2003–2004); Granada Productions (2005); ITV Productions (2007)

Original release
- Network: ITV
- Release: 7 February 2003 – 31 May 2007

The Last Detective is a British TV comedy drama series, broadcast on ITV between 7 February 2003 and 31 May 2007, starring Peter Davison as the title character, Detective Constable "Dangerous Davies". The series is based on the "Dangerous Davies" series of novels written by Leslie Thomas, and was filmed in the north London suburbs of Willesden, Neasden and Harlesden.

The first series aired in 2003, with three more series following it. The first, second and third series all consist of four 70-minute episodes (90-minutes with advertisements). The fourth series is slightly longer, encompassing five episodes. After a total of seventeen episodes, production company Meridian Broadcasting (later ITV Productions), who produced the programme, stated that the series had been axed due to falling viewing figures, and that the fourth series would be the last.

The Meridian series was not the first time that the title character had appeared on television. He previously appeared in a TV movie, first broadcast on 4 January 1981, starring Bernard Cribbins.

== Background ==
The series follows Detective Constable "Dangerous" Davies. Davies discovered a crime committed by a fellow officer at the opening of the series, and is treated as a pariah by his colleagues as a consequence. Moreover, he is committed to his work and is staunchly humane, leading to a view of his being soft by colleagues, and a degree of grudging respect from local criminals. The show's title reflects the initial attitude of his superiors, who describe him as "the last detective" who would be considered to head up a major case. Recurring themes include Davies solving the apparently minor crimes he is given, often resolving more complex and associated crimes (historical or contemporary), and Davies repeatedly being the target of practical jokes by younger but better positioned detectives in his unit.

As the series progresses, his reputation improves with his superior, Detective Inspector (DI) Aspinall, who realises that Davies' intelligence and fair but determined methods make him the best policeman in his squad. A strained mutual respect develops between the two characters as Davies increasingly finds the time to try to understand the troubled, hard drinking DI and his history (and demons).

The other major aspect of the series concerns Davies' private life, which centres on his estranged wife, Julie (played by Emma Amos). The storyline regularly integrates Davies' attempts to address the loss of his wife's respect and to repair the damage done to their marriage after his career stalls; for instance, Davies returns to pick up a dog whose custody he shares with Julie in the first episode, served as her occasional chauffeur and carries out routine household maintenance at the family home (occasionally intersecting with Julie's new relationship interests).

His work and personal life intertwine in interactions with his friend, the irreverent and rather feckless Mod (short for Modesty) Lewis, played by the Irish comedian Sean Hughes, which include their park bench talks about cases and life, Davies chauffeuring the unlicensed Mod, and Davies walking his dog—an unnamed, but consistent character, a Landseer in early episodes, and later a St Bernard. Other recurring plot elements are the now "semi-detached" Davies' interactions with various female characters, episode by episode, and his relationship with Mrs Fulljames (Elizabeth Bennett), the romantic daydreaming landlady of the Bali-Hai Guest House, where he resides for a period.

== Cast ==
- Peter Davison as "Dangerous" Davies; detective constable
- Sean Hughes as Modesty "Mod" Lewis; Davies' best friend
- Emma Amos as Julie Davies; Davies' wife
- Rob Spendlove as Ray Aspinall; detective inspector
- Charles De'Ath as Phillip Pimlott; detective sergeant
- Billy Geraghty as Darren Barrett; detective constable
- Colin MacLachlan as Timothy Stone; police sergeant (Series 1–2)
- Michele Austin as Cheryl Holmes; WPC (Series 1)
- Natasha Williams as Yvonne Clarke; WPC (Series 2)
- Vineeta Rishi as Maya "Zsa Zsa" Kapoor; WPC (Series 3–4)
- Elizabeth Bennett as Mrs. Dorothy Fulljames; Davies' landlady (Series 1–2, 4)

== Series overview ==
Series	Episodes	Originally released	
Series	Episodes	First released	Last released
1	4	7 February 2003	28 February 2003
2	4	13 February 2004	5 March 2004
3	4	29 May 2005	19 June 2005
4	5	3 May 2007	31 May 2007

== Episodes ==
=== Series 1 (2003) ===
No. overall	No. in series	Title	Directed by	Written by	Original release date	Viewers (millions)
1	1	"The Last Detective"	Nick Hurran	Richard Harris	7 February 2003	6.25
Davies' investigation into the disappearance of a seventeen-year-old girl deepens when he discovers evidence which suggests she was murdered.
2	2	"Moonlight"	Douglas Mackinnon	Richard Harris	14 February 2003	6.26
The disappearance of an elderly philanderer takes an interesting turn when his abandoned car is found parked in the grounds of Heathrow Airport.
3	3	"Tricia"	Pip Broughton	Richard Harris	21 February 2003	5.74
Davies discovers a link between three separate investigations – an armed robbery at a jobcentre, the disappearance of a pensioner and a routine house burglary.
4	4	"Lofty"	Matthew Evans	Richard Harris	28 February 2003	6.18
Davies investigates the drowning of a local character known for collecting discarded scraps of paper – but did he stumble across someone's well kept secrets?

=== Series 2 (2004) ===
No. overall	No. in series	Title	Directed by	Written by	Original release date	Viewers (millions)
5	1	"Christine"	Ferdinand Fairfax	Richard Harris	13 February 2004	6.18
Davies investigates the murder of a former Lottery winner after he is burned to death while drunk in a locked room in a suspected arson attack.
6	2	"The Long Bank Holiday"	Moira Armstrong	Russell Lewis	20 February 2004	5.77
Davies has to juggle a possible suicide, a murderer who has absconded from prison, the discovery of human remains in a local garden and a spate of computer thefts.
7	3	"Benefit to Mankind"	Gavin Millar	Michael Aitkens	27 February 2004	5.65
When the body of a medical researcher is found in the river, Davies suspects the case may be suicide – until the man's co-worker later disappears.
8	4	"Dangerous and the Lonely Hearts"	David Tucker	Russell Lewis	5 March 2004	5.74
The case of a young Eastern European girl who is arrested for shoplifting takes a bizarre turn when police arrive to interview her mother – and find she has been strangled.

=== Series 3 (2005) ===
No. overall	No. in series	Title	Directed by	Written by	Original release date	Viewers (millions)
9	1	"Friends Reunited"	A.J. Quinn	Kevin Clarke	29 May 2005	6.37
Nick Roberts (Peter Sullivan), a multi-millionaire mobile phone salesman, is found dead after being stabbed fifteen times at a school reunion party held by his former classmate Edward Netherton (Steve Pemberton). Prime suspect for the murder is Simon Dabney (Stephen Tompkinson), Nick's former best friend who has since become a heroin addict. Despite Aspinall and Pimlott being convinced of Dabney's guilt, Davies suspects there is more to the case than meets the eye, and discovers that Dabney in fact has an alibi for the time of the murder – the only problem being that the man who supposedly saw him, Denny Flemyng (David Calder), known locally as 'The Man With No Name', is a convicted career criminal who disappeared sixteen years previously, presumed dead. Davies uses Mod's help to try and track down Flemyng in an attempt to prove Dabney's innocence.
10	2	"Towpaths of Glory"	David Tucker	Matthew Thomas	5 June 2005	6.18
Frank Moore, a decorated war hero, is found shot through the head on a garbage pile at the local landfill. Davies suspects that a history of domestic violence against his wife, Cathy (Lindsey Coulson) may somehow be connected to his death. Davies also interviews Craig Thorn (Charles Dale), Moore's former business partner, with whom he had recently fallen out. However, when CCTV footage of an army vehicle close the location of Moore's murder on the night of his death is discovered, the spotlight is soon cast upon members of Moore's former platoon, including volatile sergeant Stephen Kay (Hugo Speer). Meanwhile, Mod has a new job directing customers to a carpet shop, Aspinall tries to make amends with his friends and colleagues as he prepares to give up drinking, and Davies is forced to fend off DS Jez Kendall, who has taken a shine to Julie.
11	3	"Three Steps to Hendon"	Moira Armstrong	Tim Vaughan	12 June 2005	6.10
Teddy O'Connor (Tony Slattery), former lead singer of 1970s rock band Overnight Sensations, is found dead in his flat after suspected asphyxiation by alcohol. Pimlott and Barrett suspect death by misadventure, believing it is an open and shut case – but Davies isn't so sure. After investigating a noise complaint at a local pub and discovering that Teddy was involved in a punch up shortly before his death, Davies suspects murder, and the post mortem soon backs up his suspicions. Davies interviews Teddy's former bandmates, Harvey Troupe (Tim Healy) and Gerry Jameson (Nigel Planer), who both throw suspicion toward their former manager, Billy Wunder (Ian McNeice), whom they claim sexually abused them throughout their time in the band. However, the investigation takes a surprising turn when a link to the suicide of a fifteen-year-old girl in 1977 is made.
12	4	"Willesden Confidential"	Matthew Evans	Russell Lewis	19 June 2005	5.84
Geoff Fallon (Connor Byrne), a local stock car driver, is murdered when his car bursts into flames during a race at the local stadium. Forensic analysis uncovers that the fuel supply line to his car had been tampered with prior to the race. Initially, Davies suspects Roly Kingwell (Sid Mitchell), a burger van employee whose five-year-old brother was mowed down and killed by Fallon in a hit-and-run some years previously. Roly initially confesses to the murder, but this only quashes Dangerous's suspicions about his being the killer. Davies's attention turns to Fallon's brother Steve (Aidan Gillen), a fellow stock car driver, with whom he had a friendly rivalry; Fallon's wife, Maureen (Michelle Collins); and local mechanic Andy Holden (Dorian Lough), who was working on the car prior to the race. Meanwhile, Davies agrees to help Aspinall out of trouble, and Mod learns to drive.

=== Series 4 (2007) ===
No. overall	No. in series	Title	Directed by	Written by	Original release date	Viewers (millions)
13	1	"Once Upon a Time on the Westway"	Nick Laughland	Matthew Thomas	3 May 2007	4.48
A notorious diamond robber, Jimmy Vincent, is released from prison, and within hours, an armed robbery involving the theft of diamonds is reported.
14	2	"Dangerous Liaisons"	David Tucker	Ed McCardie	10 May 2007	4.52
The death of an amateur photographer uncovers a snuff film made in the 1980s, which shows footage of a young girl who was later found murdered.
15	3	"A Funny Thing Happened on the Way to Willesden"	Douglas Mackinnon	Richard Leslie	17 May 2007	3.98
The poisoning of a stand-up comedian working the club circuit leads Davies into the murky world of comedy rivalry and playboy nightlife.
16	4	"The Man from Montevideo"	Sandy Johnson	Matthew Thomas	24 May 2007	4.34
Davies investigates the murder of a limousine driver who is found at the wheel of his limo, his neck having been slashed with a broken bottle.
17	5	"The Dead Peasant's Society"	Martyn Friend	Ed McCardie	31 May 2007	3.92
Davies investigates the death of Daniel Boden, who is found dead at the wheel of his car on a football pitch, and uncovers a link to a local Masonic lodge.

== Home media ==
The Last Detective: Complete Collection was released on Region 1 DVD on 20 January 2009 and includes all 17 episodes of the TV show, the earlier TV movie, and other features including an interview with Peter Davison. The DVD set is distributed by Acorn Media UK.
