= The Virgin Soldiers =

1966 novel by Leslie Thomas

- First edition
- Author: Leslie Thomas
- Language: English
- Published: 1966 (Constable)
- Publication place: United Kingdom
- Media type: Print (Hardback & Paperback)
- Pages: 256 pp (hardback edition)
- Preceded by: This Time Next Week (1964)
- Followed by: Orange Wednesday (1967)

The Virgin Soldiers is a 1966 comic novel by Leslie Thomas, inspired by his own experiences of National Service in the British Army. It was Thomas' debut novel; he had previously published an autobiography. The Virgin Soldiers sold millions of copies during the author´s lifetime.

== Plot summary ==
The core of the plot is the romantic triangle formed by the protagonist, a conscript soldier named Private Brigg, a worldly professional soldier named Sergeant Driscoll and Phillipa Raskin, the daughter of the Regimental Sergeant Major. The location is a British army base in Singapore during the Malayan Emergency.

Brigg and Phillipa are virgins in every sense of the word; they are both barely out of adolescence. Brigg is fearful of Phillipa's father and hardly dares go near her. He is equally afraid of the Malay and Chinese prostitutes in the nearby city. His only outlet is with his mates in the barracks, who fantasize endlessly about what they might do without actually knowing how to go ahead and do it.

Phillipa is getting more and more rebellious, eventually setting herself up with Sgt. Driscoll as a lover, while she leads Brigg on in the romance department. Brigg finally summons up the courage and the cash to approach a prostitute, called Juicy Lucy by the troops. The encounter starts disastrously but after Lucy realizes Brigg is a virgin, she takes pity on him and begins his education in her own way. This develops into a long-term relationship, at least for Brigg, who she calls affectionately "Bigg". Brigg tries not to think about what Lucy does when he is not with her.

Driscoll is seething with his own inner demons. He keeps taunting a Sgt. Wellbeloved with the phrase "Rusty nails!". Wellbeloved boasts constantly of keeping the Japanese busy during World War II, as a one-man guerilla army. Towards the end of the tale, the secret is revealed: Wellbeloved was a coward, and Rusty Nails was the nickname of the soldier he betrayed to the Japanese. Driscoll beats Wellbeloved to a pulp on behalf of the victim.

The novel crystallizes around violent incidents involving rioting in the city and an attack by Communist guerillas on a train. Several of Brigg's friends are killed. Brigg tries to find Lucy for solace, only to be told she was beaten to death by soldiers. (In the film, the locomotive destroyed was one of the last four used to haul mainline BR steam - the famous Fifteen Guinea Special.) Days before he is to be sent home, he confronts Phillipa with his frustrations, with unexpectedly pleasant results. For Phillipa, however, he is a passing fancy. Her sergeant awaits ...

Eventually Brigg and his remaining friends are about to embark for home. The final scene has them shouting the name of a laundryman, whom Brigg has mistakenly shot in the hand in an earlier episode, a certain Fuk Yew. It symbolizes their relation to Malaya and Malaya to them, when the tailor responds with the appropriate hand signal, using his damaged hand.

== Film adaptation ==
The novel was turned into a film in 1969, directed by John Dexter, with a screenplay by the British screenwriter John Hopkins. It starred Hywel Bennett, John Scott, Nigel Patrick and Lynn Redgrave. David Bowie cut his hair short to audition for a role but can only be seen in a brief shot in the finished movie, being pushed out from behind a bar. A sequel, Stand Up, Virgin Soldiers, followed in 1977 with Nigel Davenport repeating his role as Sgt Driscoll.
