= Nude in the Nettles =

Unidentified decedent in North Yorkshire, England

Coordinates: 54.238694°N 1.1803056°W

Location where the body was found

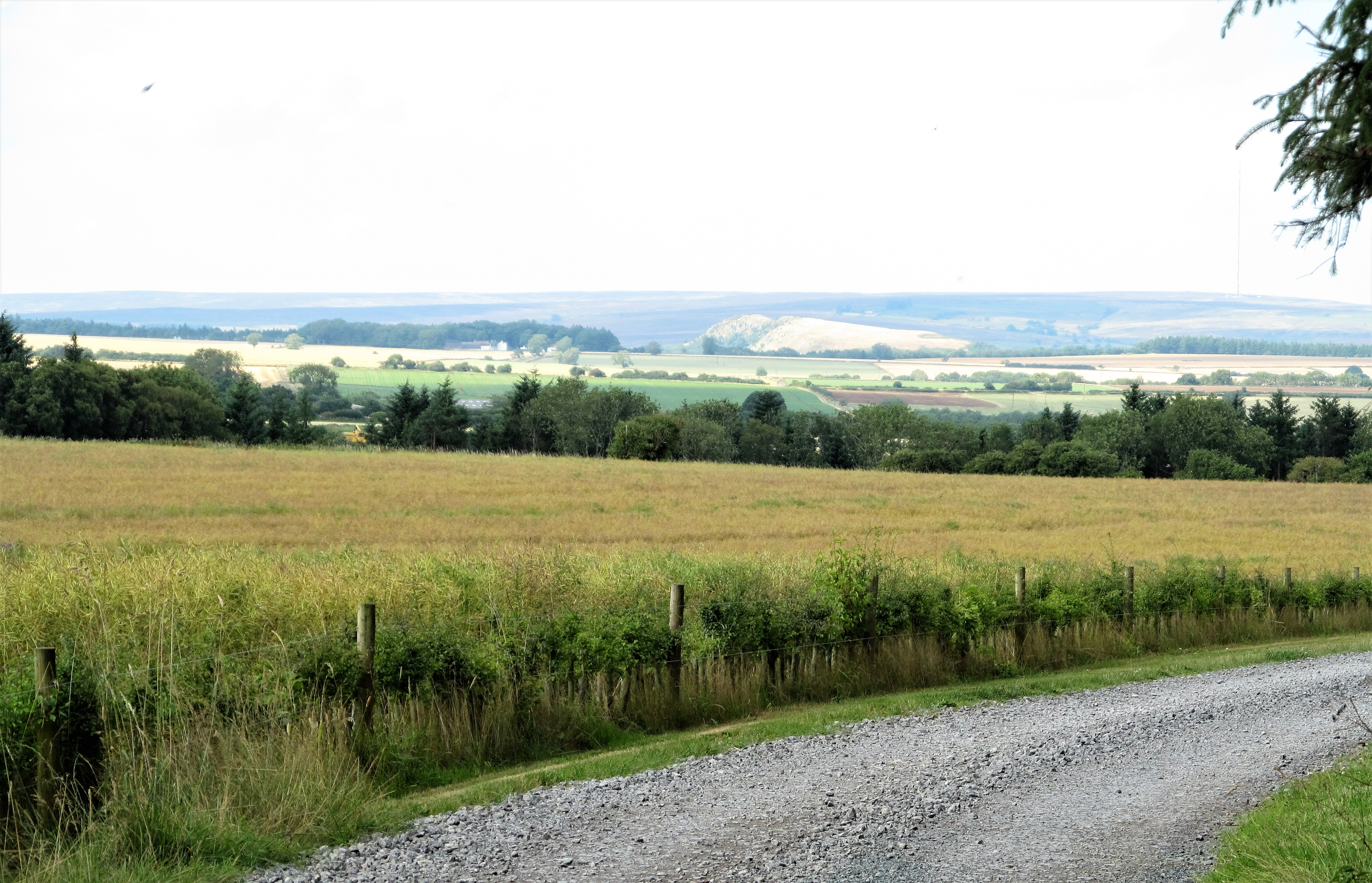
Driveway to Scawton Moor House

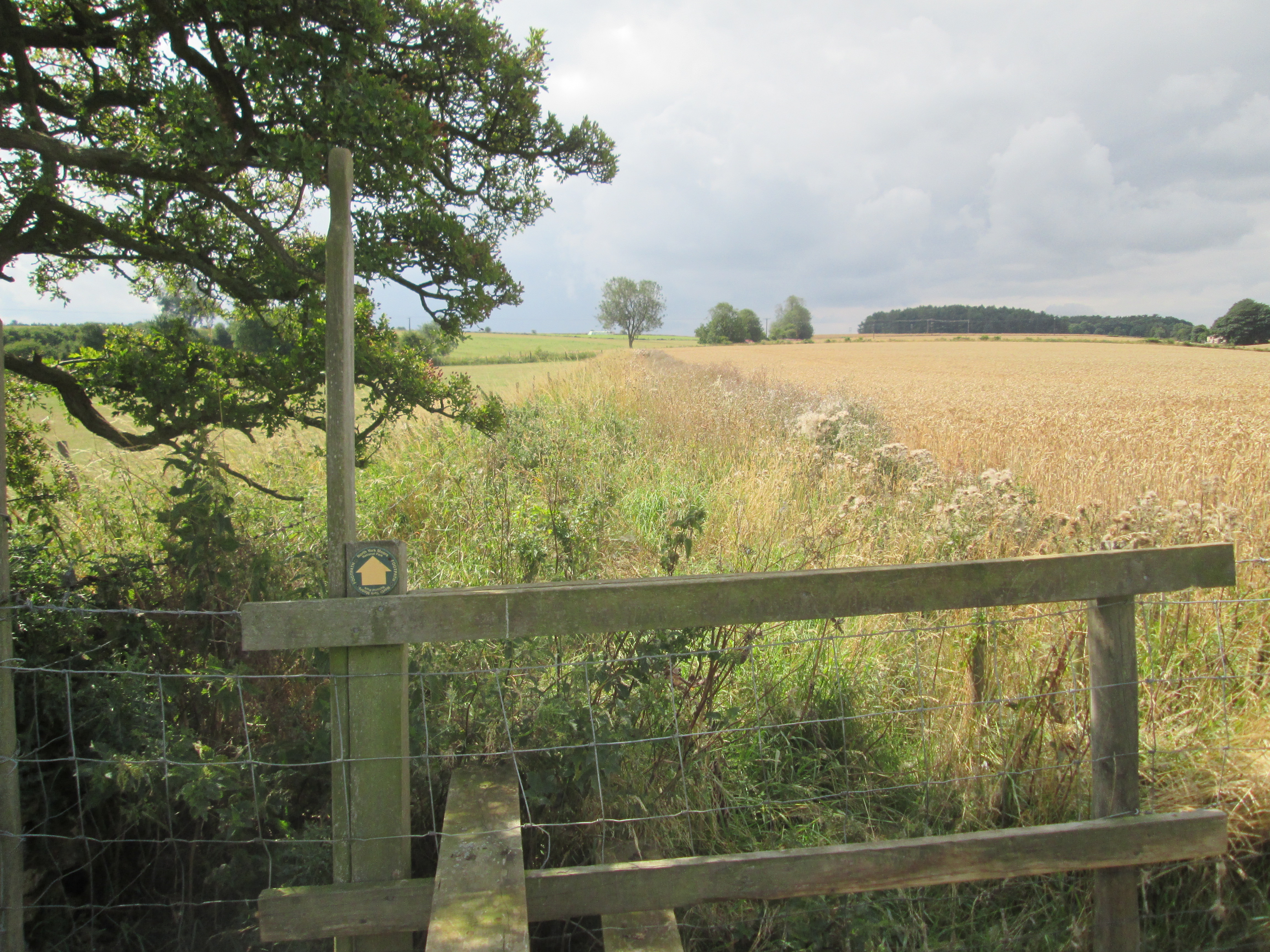
Overgrown footpath going southwest to minor road - from Scawton Moor House to Sutton Bank

The Nude in the Nettles is the name given by the media to the body of an unknown female found concealed under what was reportedly a nettle bush (actually a willowherb bush) near Sutton Bank in North Yorkshire, England in 1981. The police were notified of the body’s location by an anonymous caller who claimed that he could not give his name for reasons of "national security". Neither the identity of the woman nor that of the caller has ever been established despite an extensive investigation.

== Discovery of the victim ==
On Friday 28 August 1981, at around 8:00 am, Constable John Jeffries at Ripon Police Station received a telephone call at the police station from a man who was described as well spoken and with a slight trace of a local accent. The caller said: “Near Scawton Moor House, you will find a decomposed body among the willow herbs.” The caller then gave instructions on how to find the body. The call lasted for less than a minute. When the caller was asked for his name and address, he stated that he could not give this information for “reasons of national security” and abruptly terminated the call.

The local village constable attended the location identified but could not initially find the body. However, after careful searching, he uncovered human bones underneath a large bed of Rosebay Willow. The CID was called to the scene and cleared a large area of undergrowth.

The body was discovered near to Sutton Bank Top on an unclassified road between Sutton Bank and Scawton and Rievaulx near the junction with the A170 Thirsk to Scarborough road.

It is thought that the body had lain undisturbed for up to two years. A clue was a discarded lid from a tin of meat paste, found to have been sold on 6 October 1979, which was found beneath the body. Police believe the woman was murdered but have never revealed how she died.

Although the location was near to the entrance to Scawton Moor House Farm, a popular family picnic area, the body was so well concealed that it was highly improbable that it could have been discovered by accident. The anonymous caller became a suspect in the murder, but his identity was never established.

== Description of the victim ==
The woman had died at the age of 35–40. In life, the woman was 5 feet 4 inches (1.63 m) tall. She had dark brown hair with a length of around 4–6 inches which was untreated and cut in a page-boy style. The victim’s toenails were painted with Max Factor Maxi, pale-pink and she wore a size four shoe.

The woman had given birth to two or three children during her life and although no wedding ring was found it is believed that she had been married. No jewellery or clothing of any kind was found with the body implying that someone had tried to conceal the victim's identity.

Analysis of the skeleton revealed that the victim had a neck vertebrae abnormality which would have caused a bad back. The victim also had a displaced septum and an old ankle fracture. Bone analysis revealed that until the age of seven, the woman lived in an area with high levels of natural fluoride in the drinking water. Two local areas that had such water were Hartlepool and Grimsby.

All the victim's upper teeth, and all but six of her lower teeth, were missing and an upper dental plate had been fitted. The woman had heavy staining on her remaining teeth which indicated that she smoked and drank heavily, and generally did not look after herself.

== Subsequent events ==
Following the investigation of the site of the discovery the wider investigation discovered some female clothing, a black evening gown and some underwear, hanging from a tree about a mile away from the location of the body. The items could not be proved to relate to the discovery of the woman but no one has come forward to claim them.

Police investigated the possibility that the woman was an escaped inmate, Geraldine Crawley, from Askham Grange open prison. However, the fugitive unexpectedly responded to a request to prove that she was still alive by sending investigating officers two thumb prints and a signature on a blank sheet of paper.

In November 1981 medical students constructed a waxwork of the woman in one of the first examples of using this technique to try to identify an unknown decedent.

In 2012, the body was exhumed so that a DNA profile could be created. The profile was compared to samples from five families, two of whom came forward of their own volition, that could potentially be related to the woman. No match was found.

In 2013 police stated that they had added the woman’s DNA profile to the national database in the hope that a match would be found in the future.
