= Il San Pietro di Positano =

General information
- Location: Via Laurito 2, 84017 Positano, Italy
- Opening: 29 June 1970
- Owner: Virginia Attanasio, Carlo and Vito Cinque

Design and construction
- Architect: Carlo Cinque
- Developer: Carlo Cinque

Other information
- Number of rooms: 57
- Number of restaurants: 2

Website
- Il San Pietro di Positano

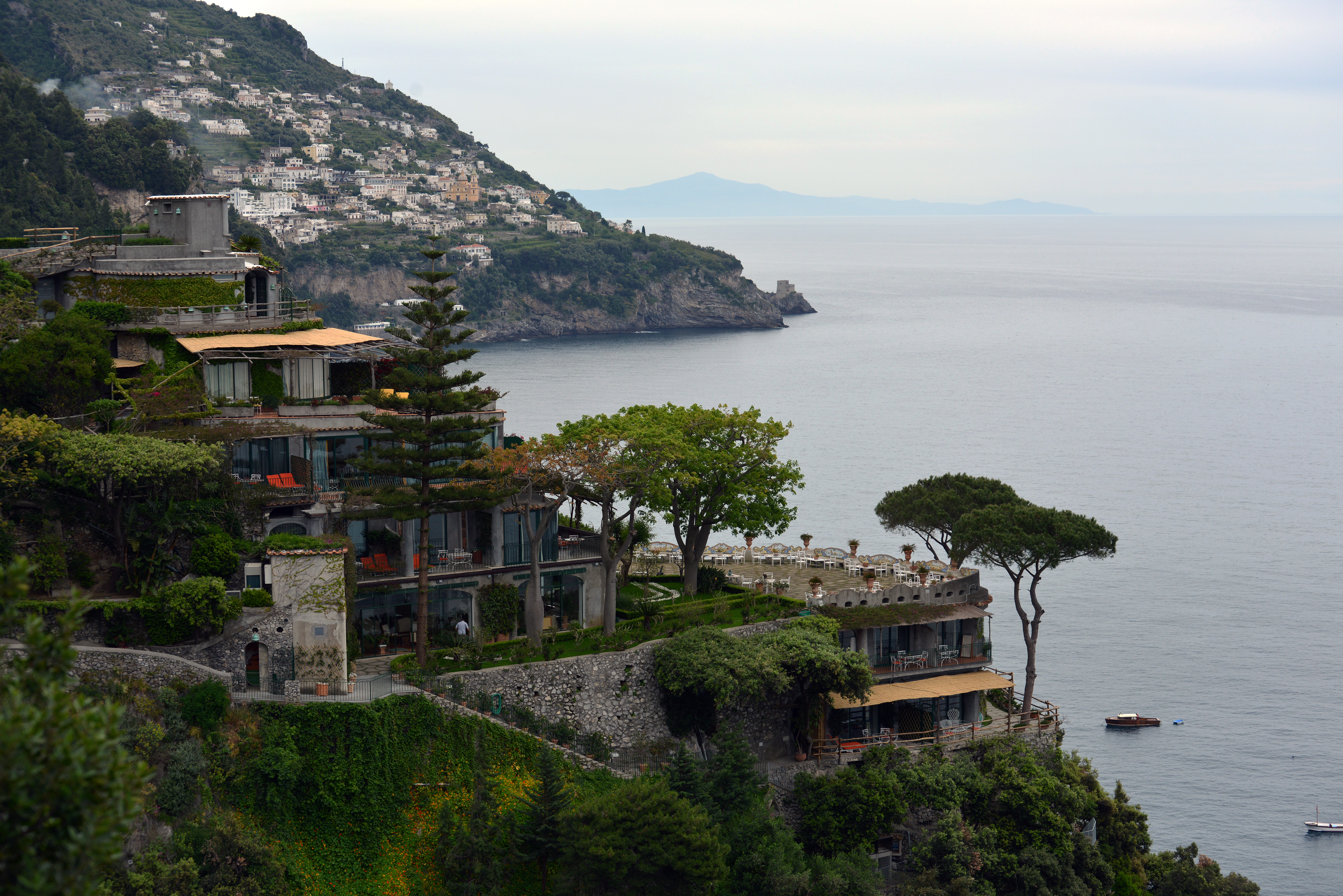
San Pietro di Positano

The San Pietro di Positano is a 5-star luxury hotel, located near the town of Positano on the Amalfi Coast of Italy.

== History ==
The San Pietro di Positano hotel was designed and built by Carlo "Carlino" Cinque (1911–1984). Before purchasing the land upon which the hotel now sits, Cinque purchased a house in the city with hopes of turning it into a hotel, he called it The Miramare.

The Miramare gradually became more established and ultimately one of the most popular hotels on the Amalfi Coast. In the late afternoons, Cinque would row his small fishing boat to a headland located two km south of Positano in the Laurito district known locally as La Punta (The Point), where he dropped his lobster pots. This area had a small beach, lush vegetation, and most notably was characterized by a tall cliff that abruptly met the sea. At the top was a small, white-walled fisherman's chapel called San Pietro. Cinque fell in love with the place and, in 1962, he successfully purchased the land from his brother-in-law.

When Cinque purchased the land, it was described as "the promontory between Positano and Praiano, that is, just a rock with a small 17th century chapel of San Pietro". Positano, at the time, was a small fishing village, but it was gradually starting to attract the attention of tourists. Following this purchase, Cinque began a gradual expansion of the chapel into an apartment with a garden and terraces, doing his best to avoid disturbing the natural beauty of the land. His idea was to build a hotel that would blend in with the surrounding landscape.

Cinque took on multiple roles throughout the construction of the hotel, serving as architect, construction engineer, site supervisor, and interior designer. The only advice he sought was from an electrical engineer. The most difficult aspect was the blasting that took place in the cliff to install an elevator from the main lobby, 88 meters (288 ft) above, to a 22 meters (75 ft) long horizontal tunnel, which led out to a seaside sunbathing platform and bar. Dynamiting and cutting through the cliff took eight years. Another three years spent constructing the buildings that would make the hotel. The hotel opened to the public on 29 June 1970 with 33 rooms.

As Cinque wanted the interior to have minimal separation from the outside landscape, including its plants and flowers, he drilled through walls, ceilings and floors and threaded vines and creepers through the openings, training them to grow from the outside in.

As time went on, he added more rooms and gardens to the hotel on nearly a dozen levels. Some rooms offer views of the sea, while others provide views of Positano and the little village of Praiano several kilometers to the south.

Carlino Cinque died in 1984, with 2,000 people attending his funeral. His niece Virginia Attanasio (1935 - ) and her brother Salvatore, took over ownership and management of the hotel. Since the death of Salvatore in 1996, the hotel has been owned and managed by Virginia Attanasio and her two sons, Vito Cinque and Carlo Cinque.

In 1989, the hotel joined the Relais et Chateaux hotel group.

In 2002, the Zass restaurant (which was previously just called the "Restaurant at Il San Pietro") received a Michelin star. In the same year, the Spa, located in a former farm building, opened its doors.

In 2008, the Carlino restaurant (which is located at sea level and is open only to guests) was opened.

In 2016, the hotel completed a nine-month, €3 million construction project to build a new kitchen, which required the extraction of 1,000 cubic meters of rock. The project was under supervision of kitchen designer Andrea Viacava and architect Fausta Gaetani. The kitchen, which is spread over two levels, and covering 400 square meters, produces up to 400 meals a day. It is equipped with an ozone treatment system, which every night at 2am, hermetically seals the kitchen and fills it with ozone, which sanitizes the kitchen. At the time of its installation, only two other restaurants in the world had a similar system.

Hotel guests have included Giovanni Agnelli, Richard Burton, Claudette Colbert, Dustin Hoffman, Rudolf Nureyev, Gregory Peck, Liza Minnelli, Laurence Olivier, Anthony Quinn, who brought his family for an entire month, Tina Turner, Brooke Shields, Barbra Streisand, Misa, Zuko, Julia Roberts, François Mitterrand and the King of Jordan. In 1975, Peter O'Toole spent a month at the hotel with his then-wife, Sian Phillips, recovering from surgery for pancreatitis, which resulted in the removal of his pancreas and a large portion of his stomach.

The hotel was voted the 8th best hotel in Italy in the Readers' Choice Awards 2016.

== Gallery ==
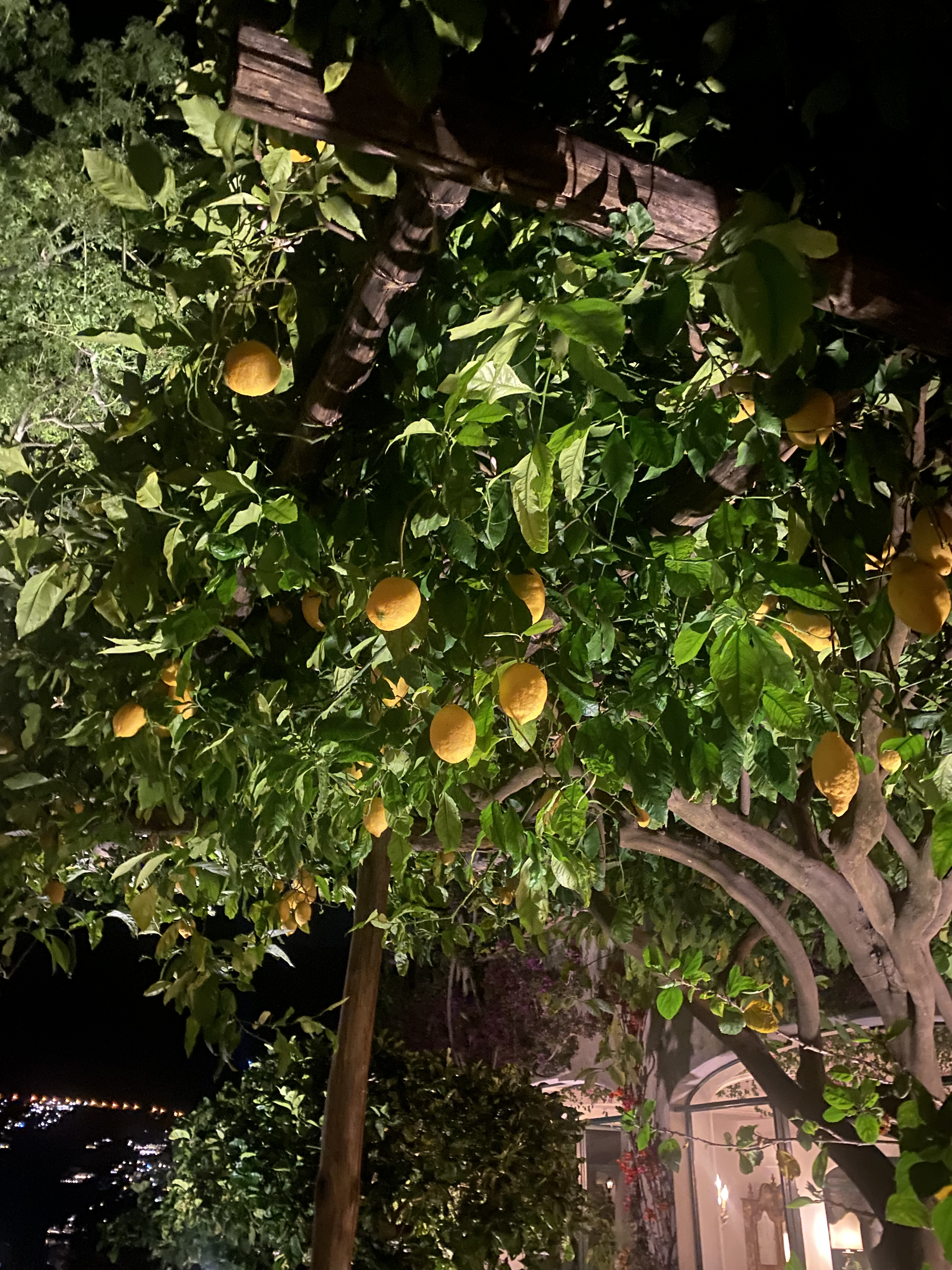

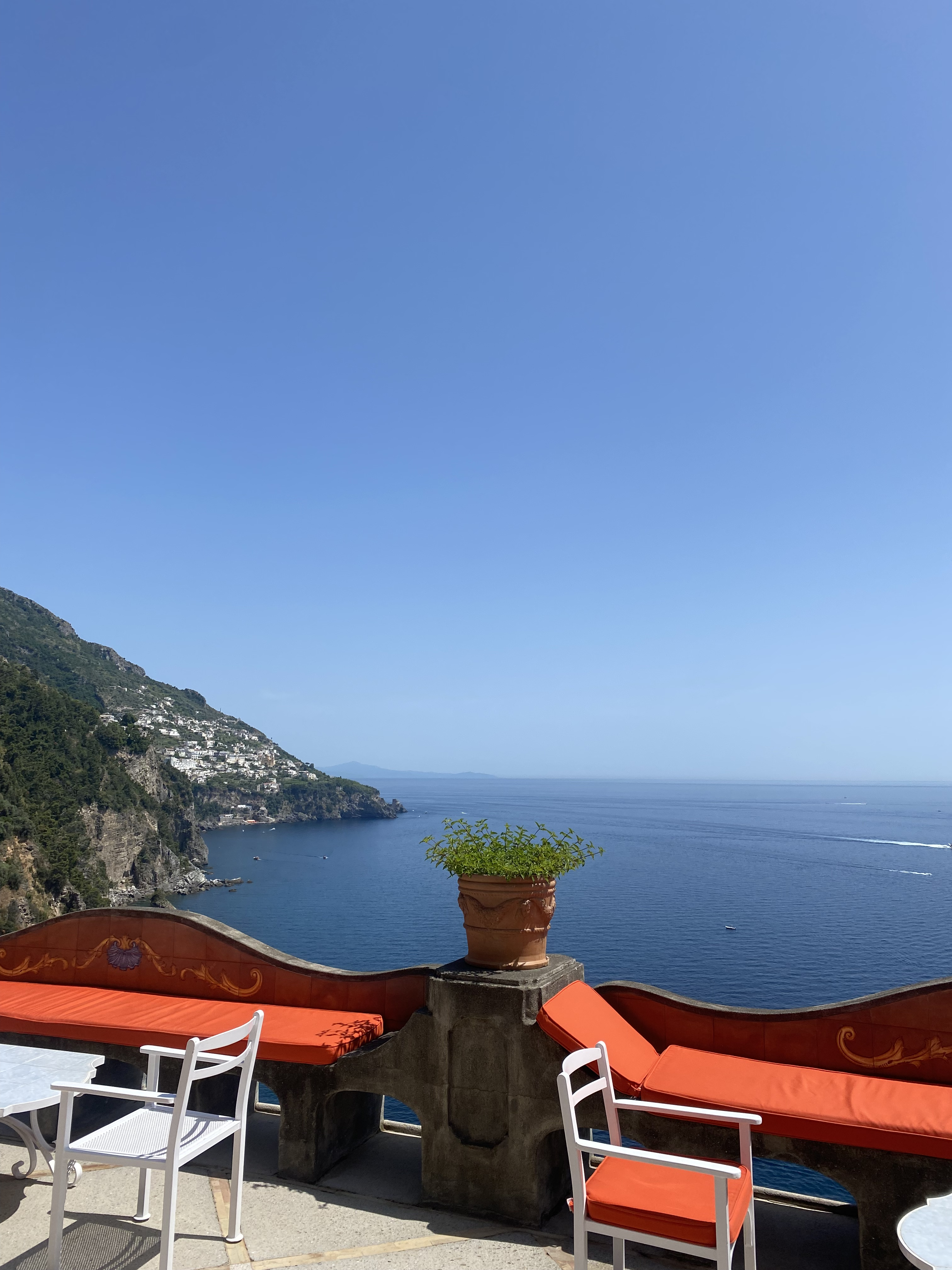

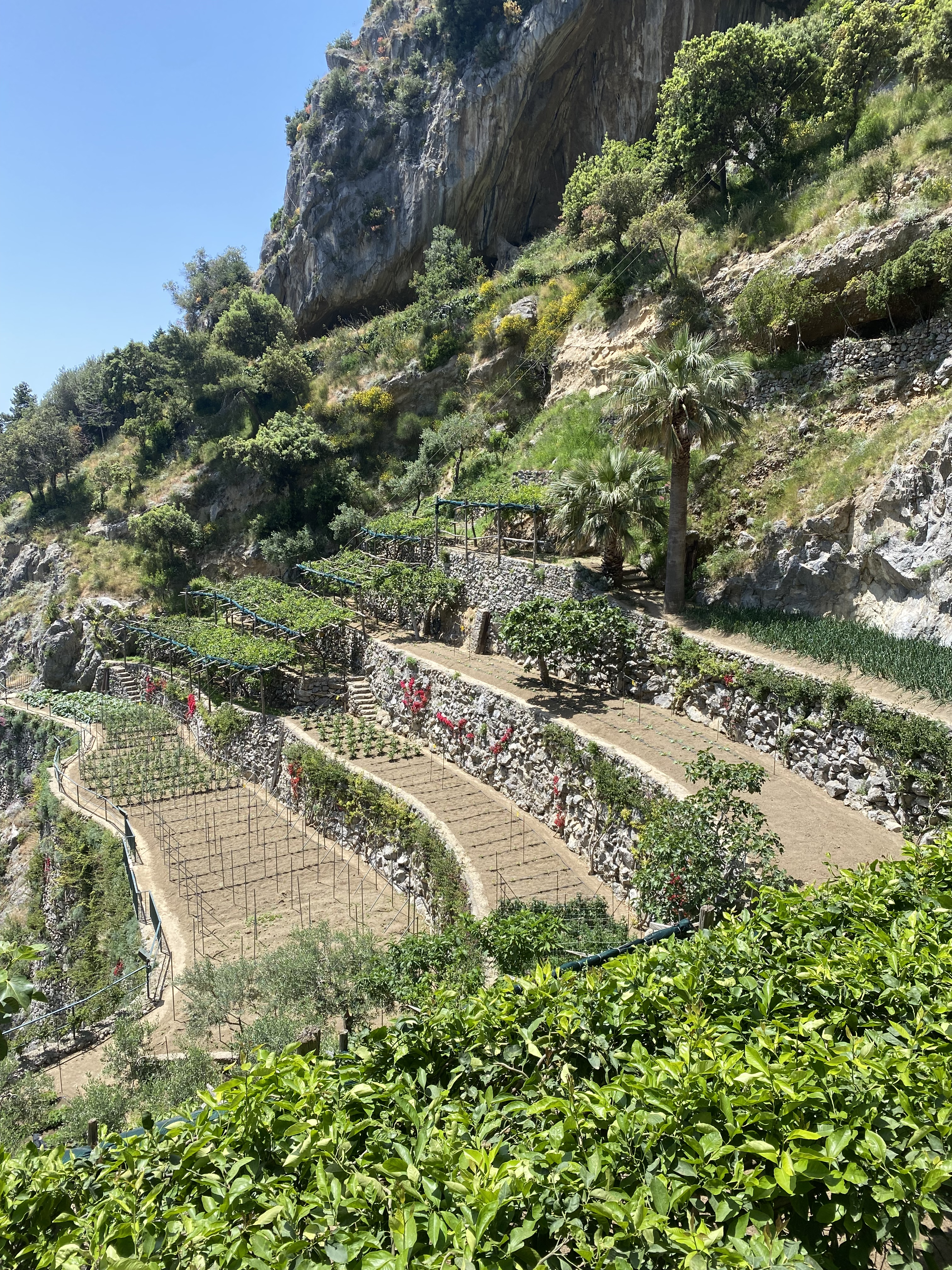

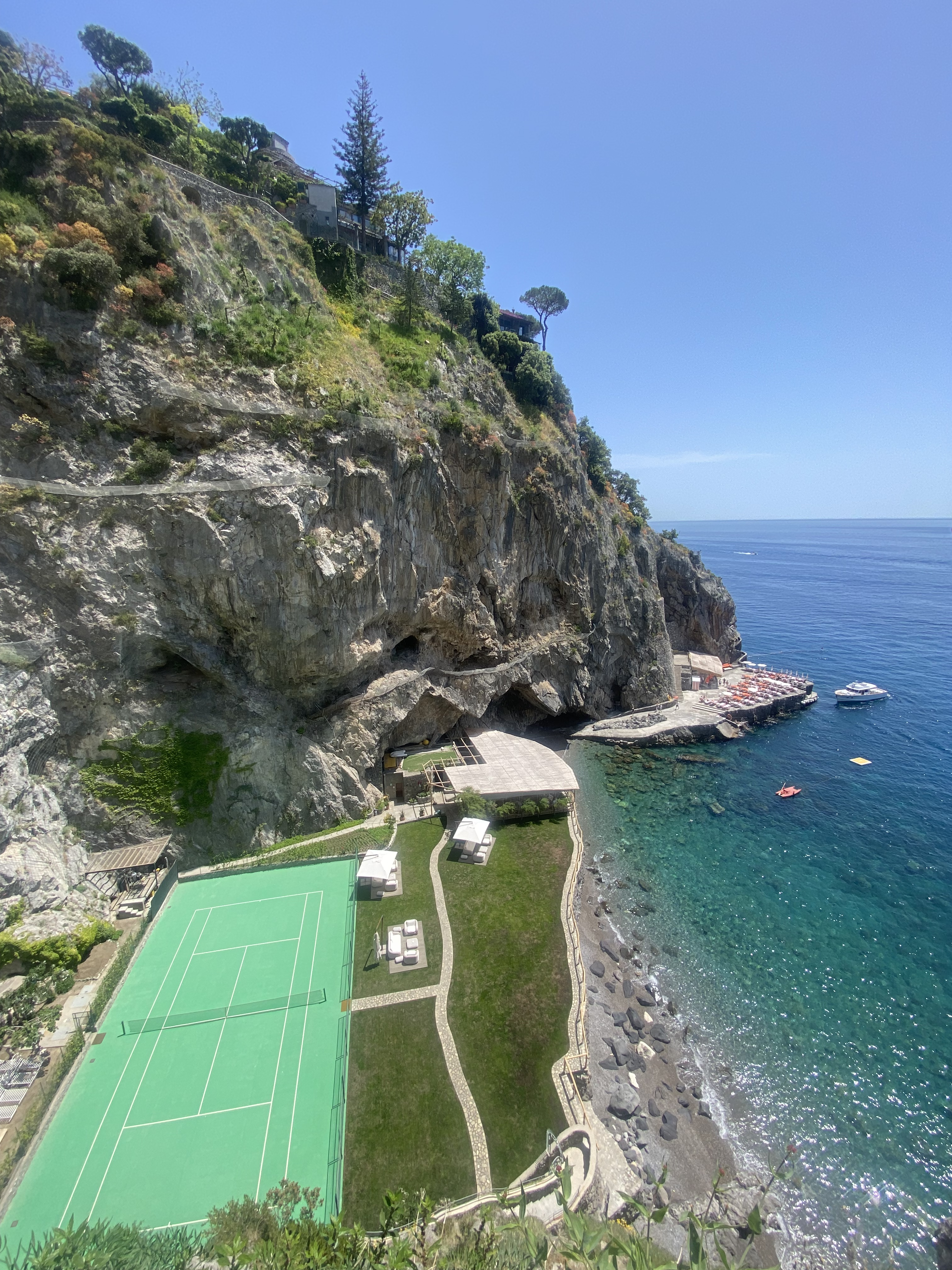
