= Hywel Bennett =

Welsh actor (1944–2017)

- Bennett in 1966
- Born: Hywel Thomas Bennett; 8 April 1944; Garnant, Carmarthenshire, Wales
- Died: 24 July 2017 (aged 73); Deal, Kent, England
- Education: Royal Academy of Dramatic Art
- Occupation: Actor
- Years active: 1965–2007
- Spouses: Cathy McGowan (m. 1970; div. 1988) Sandra Layne Fulford (m. 1998)
- Children: 1
- Relatives: Alun Lewis (brother); Amelia Warner (niece); Grace Crompton (granddaughter)

Hywel Thomas Bennett (Note: According to director Roy Boulting, Bennett was not consistent on the pronunciation of his given name: "It's pronounced 'Howell' or 'Hugh-el,' ... altho [sic] he seems to use one pronunciation one day, and another the next.") (8 April 1944 – 24 July 2017) was a Welsh film and television actor. He had a lead role in The Family Way (1966) and played the "thinking man's layabout" James Shelley in the television sitcom Shelley (1979–1992).

Bennett played opposite Hayley Mills in The Family Way, Twisted Nerve (1968) and Endless Night (1972). Other notable film roles include Private Brigg in the comedy The Virgin Soldiers (1969), Dennis in Loot (1970) and Edwin Antony in Percy (1971). Bennett's character, Ricki Tarr, was pivotal in the BBC serial adaptation of John le Carré's Tinker, Tailor, Soldier, Spy (1979). In later years, he was often cast in villainous roles including Mr Croup in Neil Gaiman's Neverwhere (1996), Peter Baxter in ITV police drama The Bill (2002) and crime boss Jack Dalton in EastEnders (2003).

== Early life ==
Bennett was born on 8 April 1944 in Garnant, Carmarthenshire, Wales, the son of Sarah Gwen (née Lewis) and Gorden Bennett. His first language was Welsh; he learned to speak English in an accent he called "London-Welsh" after the family moved to south London when he was four. He was the brother of actor Alun Lewis, who is best known for playing Vic Windsor in Emmerdale. Bennett attended Sunnyhill School, Streatham, Henry Thornton Grammar School, Clapham (1955–62) and the Royal Academy of Dramatic Art.

== Career ==
Bennett debuted on stage in the role of Ophelia in a Queen's Theatre production of Hamlet in 1959. He continued with the company for five years, his roles including Richmond in Richard III at the Scala Theatre in 1963. After a brief period working as a supply teacher, Bennett won a scholarship to train at Royal Academy of Dramatic Art and performed in repertory in Salisbury and Leatherhead. He made his television debut in 1964, making early appearances in episodes of Doctor Who and Theatre 625. In 1966, he appeared as the lead Willy Turner in BBC1 Wednesday Play "Where the Buffalo Roam". This role as a mentally disturbed, cowboy-obsessed teenager was the first of many parts in Dennis Potter television plays.

His first film appearance was as Leonardo in the 1966 Italian Il marito è mio e l'ammazzo quando mi pare ("It's my husband and I'll decide when to kill him"), directed by Pasquale Festa Campanile, a comedy in which a young wife carefully plans to murder her husband, who is 40 years her senior, to marry a young beatnik. Bennett then starred as nervously virginal newlywed Arthur Fitton opposite Hayley Mills in the Boulting brothers' adaptation of Bill Naughton's play The Family Way (1966). He was cast after John Boulting saw him in the Alan Plater play A Smashing Day and felt he had "the appearance of both sensitivity and masculinity." The success of the film gained Bennett a contract with British Lion Films and led the News of the World to dub him "the face of '67". He considered his looks "a boon and a curse. It won me quick fame, but I was a serious actor being written up as a pin-up boy and sex symbol... ...I used to wish for a broken nose." He was reunited with Mills and the Boultings in the psychological thriller Twisted Nerve (1968), playing Martin Durnley in what the British Film Institute has described as "one of cinema's most striking depictions of evil". In 1969, he starred as Private Brigg in The Virgin Soldiers, a comedy-drama film set during the Malayan Emergency. Bennett described the film as "the story of a young soldier's love affair with a Chinese prostitute and the fear he develops in combat situations. One day he runs the wrong way and accidentally becomes a hero." In 1969, contemporary critic Roger Ebert called him "one of England's best young actors".

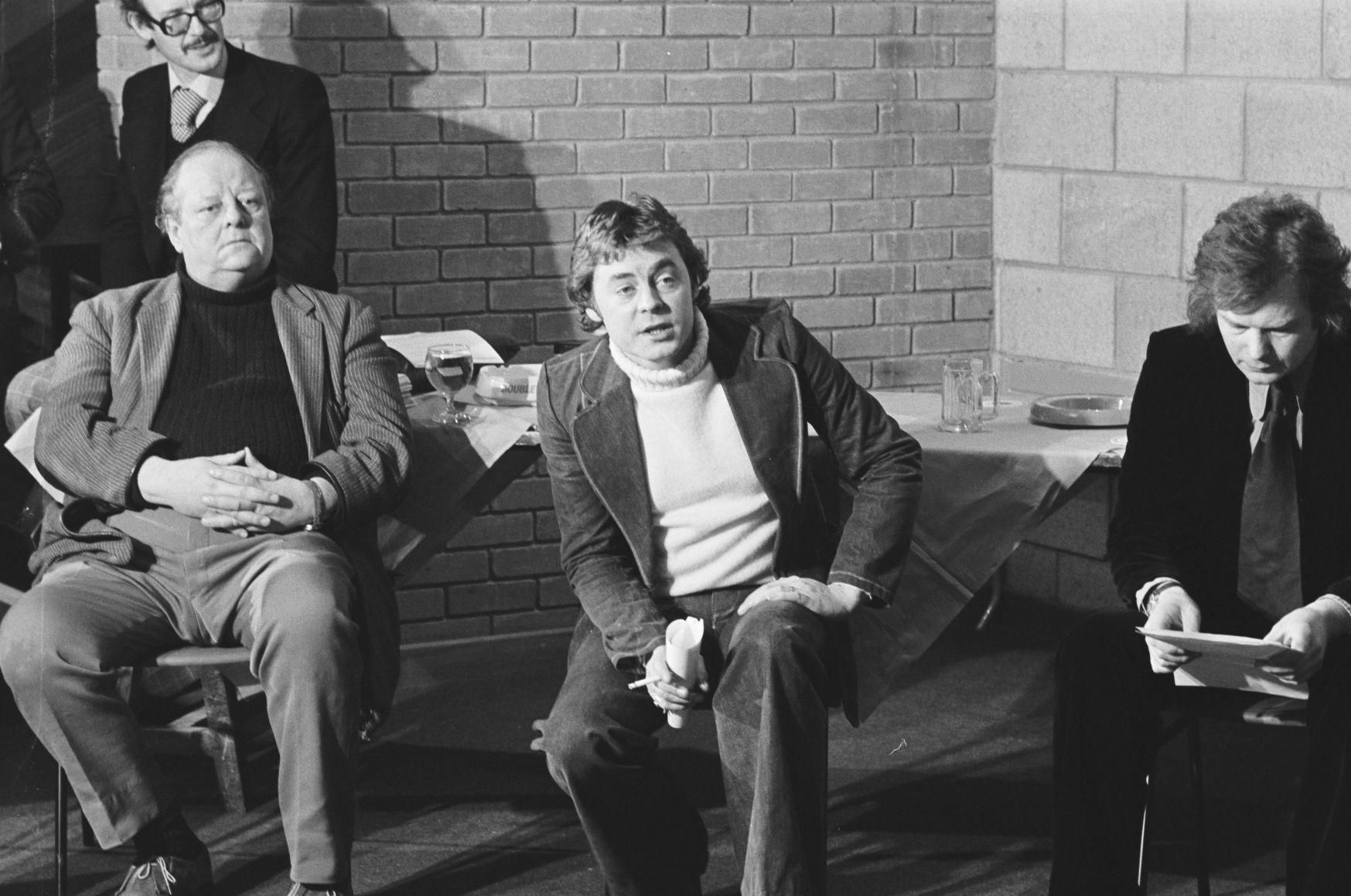
Bennett leading a press conference at Theatre Gwynedd in 1975

Bennett's film roles continued into the 1970s, notably with the film adaptation of Joe Orton's Loot (1970) and Endless Night (1972), an Agatha Christie adaptation again pairing him with Hayley Mills. He was the preferred choice for the role of Brian Roberts in Bob Fosse's Cabaret (1972), but wrongly assumed it was a singing role and didn't read the script. The part went to Michael York. He starred in the Ralph Thomas-directed sex comedies Percy (1971), in which he plays a shy young man who becomes the recipient of the world's first penis transplant, and The Love Ban (1973). Of this period in his career, Bennett would later state "I had come in at the tail end of everything, the studio system and so on. I found myself in the early 70s with nowhere to go."

He maintained a career in the theatre. His Puck in a 1967 Edinburgh Festival production of A Midsummer Night's Dream was described by The Illustrated London News as "the best since Leslie French". He returned to the festival in 1990 as Long John Silver in a stage adaptation of Robert Louis Stevenson's Treasure Island. He appeared in several National Theatre productions including playing Mark Antony in Julius Caesar (the Young Vic, 1972) and Marlow in the She Stoops to Conquer (the Lyttelton Theatre, 1984). Other notable roles include Prince Hal in Henry IV, Parts 1 & 2 (the Mermaid Theatre, 1970), the lead in Hamlet on a 1974 South African tour and Andrey Prozorov in Three Sisters (the Albery Theatre, 1987). He also directed productions in provincial theatres, including a 1975 adaptation of J. B. Priestley's I Have Been Here Before at Theatr Gwynedd, Bangor.

Bennett's television career resumed with appearances in episodes of Play for Today (1973) and The Sweeney (1976). In 1978, he appeared in Dennis Potter's musical drama Pennies from Heaven as Tom, a pimp. In 1979, Bennett appeared as the field agent Ricki Tarr in Arthur Hopcraft's six-part BBC2 adaptation of John le Carré's novel Tinker, Tailor, Soldier, Spy (1979), playing the character with "an ever-thinning veneer of boyish charm masking years of self-delusion and betrayal" according to the BFI. Bennett then starred in two further BBC miniseries - Malice Aforethought (1979) and The Consultant (1981). In 1981, he played occult novelist Gideon Harlax in David Rudkin's television play Artemis 81.

In 1979 he took the lead role in the Thames Television sitcom Shelley (1979–84) as the titular "professional freelance layabout" James Shelley, a philosophical and sardonic geography graduate with no desire to work. The series, created by Peter Tilbury, drew audiences of up to 18 million viewers. According to Bennett, "the writers had done something pretty amazing. They had created what was almost a monologue and turned it into a popular sitcom." The programme resumed, initially under the title The Return of Shelley, in 1988 and continued until 1992.

During the 1980s, Bennett was the voice of British Rail in their advertisements featuring the slogan "We're getting there". He provided further voiceovers for Budweiser and Hoffmeister advertisements. In 1986, he played the investigative journalist Allan Blakeston in Paula Milne's single drama Frankie and Johnnie, a production he described as "one of the best things I've done in quite a long time". He lost weight to give the character a "hungry and haunted look". The following year, he played an architect whose reaction to urban violence is to steadily turn his suburban home into a virtual fortress in Andy Hamilton's black comedy Checkpoint Chiswick, part of the Tickets for the Titanic anthology series.

By the mid-1990s alcoholism and treatment for an overactive thyroid had altered Bennett's appearance. He was often cast in unsavoury roles including club owner Arthur 'Pig' Mallion in Dennis Potter's final, linked television plays Karaoke and Cold Lazarus (both 1996) and the villainous Mr Croup in Neil Gaiman's serial Neverwhere (1996). On film, he played in Dr. Crippen in Deadly Advice (1994) and Jean-Baptiste Colbert in Vatel (2000). He appeared in Lock, Stock... (2000) as Deep Throat and joined the cast of the long-running soap opera EastEnders in 2003, playing Jack Dalton – the ruthless gangland kingpin of Walford. Other late television appearances include ten appearances as sex offender Peter Baxter in The Bill (2002–2005) and as Dr. Mike Vine in the first episode of Jam & Jerusalem (2006). His final television role was opposite Peter Davison in an episode of The Last Detective (2007).

== Personal life ==
In 1970 Bennett married Cathy McGowan, who had been the presenter of the music television programme Ready Steady Go! (1963–66). They had a daughter, Emma. The marriage was dissolved in 1988. In September 1986, Bennett sought treatment for alcoholism at the Priory Hospital, Roehampton. In 1998, he married Sandra Layne Fulford and they later moved to an old cottage near the sea, at Deal, Kent. Bennett retired from acting in 2007 after being diagnosed with a congenital heart defect. He died at home, on 24 July 2017, at the age of 73.

== Filmography ==
=== Film ===
Year	Title	Role	Notes
1966	The Family Way	Arthur Fitton	
1968	Il marito è mio e l'ammazzo quando mi pare	Leonardo	Italian
1968	Twisted Nerve	Martin Durnley/Georgie Clifford	
1969	The Virgin Soldiers	Private Brigg	
1970	The Buttercup Chain	France	
1970	Loot	Dennis	
1971	Percy	Edwin Anthony	
1972	Endless Night	Michael Rogers	
1972	Alice's Adventures in Wonderland	Duckworth	
1973	The Love Ban	Mick Goonahan	
1985	Murder Elite	Jimmy Fowler	
1987	Deadline	Mike Jessop	
1994	Deadly Advice	Dr. Crippen	
1999	Misery Harbour	The Captain	
1999	Nasty Neighbours	The Boss	
2000	Vatel	Jean-Baptiste Colbert	
2000	Married 2 Malcolm	Reg	
2003	One for the Road	Richard Stevens	

=== Television ===
Year	Title	Role	Notes
1964	Julius Caesar	Octavius Caesar	TV film
1964	Redcap	Brown	Episode: "Nightwatch"
1965	Doctor Who	Rynian	Serial: "The Chase"
1965	Jury Room	Joe Mintz	Episode: "The Side of Mercy"
1965	Theatre 625	Lipstrob	Episode: "Unman, Wittering and Zigo"
1966	Theatre 625	Beliayev	Episode: "A Month in the Country"
1966	The Idiot	Hypolite Terentiev	Mini-series
1966	Thirteen Against Fate	Gilles Mauvaisin	Episode: "The Traveller"
1966	The Wednesday Play	Willy Turner	Episode: "Where the Buffalo Roam"
1967	The Wednesday Play	Oliver Treefe	Episode: "Death of a Teddy Bear"
1967	BBC Play of the Month	Romeo	Episode: "Romeo and Juliet"
1973	Play for Today	Tony	Episode: "Three's One"
1976	The Sweeney	Steve Castle	Episode: "Sweet Smell of Succession"
1978	Pennies from Heaven	Tom	Episode: "Better Think Twice"
1978	Strangers	Jack Slater	Episode: "Silver Lining"
1979	Malice Aforethought	Dr. Edmund Bickleigh	Mini-series
1979	Play for Today	Harry Essendorf	Episode: "Coming Out"
1979	Tinker Tailor Soldier Spy	Ricki Tarr	Mini-series
1979–1984	Shelley	James Shelley	Series regular
1981	Artemis 81	Gideon Harlax	TV film
1982	BBC Play of the Month	Mr. King/Mr. Puff	Episode: "The Critic"
1983	The Consultant	Chris Webb	Mini-series
1985	Theatre Night	John	Episode: "Absent Friends"
1986	Screen Two	Allan Blakeston	Episode: "Frankie and Johnnie"
1986	The Twilight Zone	Grant	Episode: "Devil's Alphabet"
1986	Robin of Sherwood	King Arthur	Episode: "The Inheritance"
1987	Tickets for the Titanic	Brian Stebbings	Episode: "Checkpoint Chiswick"
1988	The Modern World: Ten Great Writers	Professor	Episode: "Joseph Conrad's 'The Secret Agent'"
1988	Boon	Richard Jay	Episode: "Charity Begins at Home"
1988–1992	The Return of Shelley	James Shelley	Series regular
1991	A Mind to Kill	Gareth D. Lewis	Pilot film
1991	Ålder okänd	James Williams	Mini-series
1992	The Other Side of Paradise	Purvis	Mini-series
1992	Virtual Murder	Harold Bingham	Episode: "A Bone to Pick"
1992	Screen One	Ralph	Episode: "Trust Me"
1993	Casualty	Paul Lawson	Episode: "Life in the Fast Lane"
1993	Frank Stubbs Promotes	Clive Riley	Episode: "Book"
1994	Murder Most Horrid	Clancy	Episode: "Smashing Bird"
1996	Karaoke	Arthur 'Pig' Mallion	Mini-series
1996	Cold Lazarus	Arthur 'Pig' Mallion	Mini-series
1996	Frontiers	DS Eddie Spader	Series regular
1996	Neverwhere	Mr. Croup	Mini-series
1999	Mary, Mother of Jesus	Herod	TV film
2000	Dirty Work	Mostyn Hughes	Episode: "A Fish Called Rhondda"
2000	Lock, Stock...	Deep Throat	Episode: "...And Spaghetti Sauce"
2001	Randall & Hopkirk (Deceased)	Roger Whale	Episode: "Whatever Possessed You?"
2002	Last of the Summer Wine	Kevin	Episode: "It All Began with an Old Volvo Headlamp"
2002	Time Gentlemen Please	Barsteward in Wheelchair	Episode: "Optics Wide Shut"
2002	The Quest	Ronno	Mini-series
2002	The Bill	Peter Baxter	Recurring role
2003	EastEnders	Jack Dalton	Recurring role
2003	Lloyd & Hill	Dr. Freddie Marks	TV film
2004	The Second Quest	Ronno	TV film
2004	The Final Quest	Ronno	TV film
2005	Casualty@Holby City	David Wincott	Episode: "Interactive: Something We Can Do"
2005	High Hopes	Uncle Tom	Episode: "Uncle Tom"
2006	Jam & Jerusalem	Dr. Mike Vine	Episode: "Sudden Death"
2007	The Last Detective	Reggie Conway	Episode: "Dangerous Liaisons"
