= Robert Ellis Miller =

American film director (1927–2017)

- Born: July 18, 1927; New York City, New York, USA
- Died: January 27, 2017 (aged 89); Woodland Hills, California, USA
- Occupation: Film director
- Years active: 1959-1996
- Spouse: Pola Chasman (m. 1955-2015; her death)

Robert Ellis Miller (July 18, 1927 – January 27, 2017) was an American film director.

== Filmography ==
- Breaking Point (1963) – TV Series
- Any Wednesday (1966)
- Sweet November (1968)
- The Heart Is a Lonely Hunter (1968)
- The Buttercup Chain (1970)
- Big Truck and Sister Clare (1972)
- The Girl from Petrovka (1974)
- Just an Old Sweet Song (1976)
- Ishi: The Last of His Tribe (1978)
- The Baltimore Bullet (1980)
- Madame X (1981)
- Reuben, Reuben (1983)
- Her Life as a Man (1984)
- The Other Lover (1985)
- Intimate Strangers (1986)
- Hawks (1988)
- Brenda Starr (1989)
- Bed & Breakfast (1991)
- Pointman (1994)
- Killer Rules (1995)
- A Walton Wedding (1995)
- The Angel of Pennsylvania Avenue (1996)

== Awards ==
- Nominee, Palme d'Or, The Buttercup Chain, 1970 Cannes Film Festival
- Nominee, Best Picture, The Heart Is a Lonely Hunter (Director for film's producer nominees, Thomas Ryan and Marc Merson), Golden Globes (1968)
- Nominee, Best Director in Television, Breaking Point, Directors Guild of America (1963)
- Nominee, Best Director, Television Drama, Alcoa Premiere, Emmy Awards (1961)
