= Janice Elliott =

English fiction writer

Janice Elliott (13 October 1931 – 25 July 1995) was a prolific English fiction writer, journalist and children's writer. Her novels were critically successful in their time, but they are not currently in print.

== Life ==
Elliott was born in Derby to an advertising executive, Douglas John Elliott, and his wife, Dorothy Wilson. and raised in Nottingham. She attended Nottingham Girls' High School and then read English at St. Anne's College, Oxford University.

She worked as a journalist in 1952–1962, notably for House and Garden and the Sunday Times, and then became a full-time writer, while continuing to write freelance press reviews. Meanwhile she married Robert Cooper, an oil executive and sailor, in 1959 and had a son. She lived in Partridge Green, Sussex, for many years, before retiring in the mid-1980s to Fowey, Cornwall.

Janice Elliott received a Southern Arts award in 1981 and was elected a Fellow of the Royal Society of Literature in 1989. She died in 1995.

== Novels ==
Elliott's debut novel Cave with Echoes was published by Secker & Warburg in 1962. This, like almost all her subsequent novels, was received with enthusiasm. Anthony Burgess commented that it had style, was genuinely constructed and that the characters were excellent. The Somnabulists (1964) featured a brother and sister alienated by their parents' early deaths. Secret Places (1981) was set in a girls' boarding school during World War II, and The Country of Her Dreams (1982) in a Balkan city picked to house a nuclear bunker for European art.

Her novel The Italian Lesson (1985) was published by Hodder & Stoughton, as was most of her speculative fiction. Several of her non-domestic novels used disturbing scenarios. Dr Gruber's Daughter (1986), for example, has Adolf Hitler hiding in an attic in North Oxford in 1953, while his daughter roams the streets looking for human and feline victims to devour.

The King Awakes and The Empty Throne, 1987 and 1988 novels illustrated by Grahame Baker, form an "Arthurian sequence for older children", also known as The Sword and the Dream (series) after the title of its two-volume reissue.

Commenting on her work, Janice Elliott wrote, "I have always tried to avoid writing in a way that might invite categorisation in either subject matter or treatment. The result is a body of work ranging from the bizarre and darkly magical... to social realism." Elliott (like Anthony Trollope, for example) worked methodically at her writings, from 10 a.m. until 2 p.m. each day, taking some nine months on average to write each novel. Yet despite critical success, she found it hard to make a living out of fiction writing.

== Films ==
Elliott's novel The Buttercup Chain (1967) was filmed with the same title (1970). She worked on the screenplay. Also made the basis of a film, in 1984, were her wartime memoirs of Nottingham, Secret Places (1981).

== Published works ==
- Cave with Echoes (1962)
- The Somnambulists (1964)
- The Godmother (1966)
- The Buttercup Chain (1967)
- The Singing Head (1968)
- Angels Falling (1969)
- The Birthday Unicorn (1970), illustrated by Michael Foreman, LCCN 78-101337
- The Kindling (1970)
- A State of Peace (1971)
- Private Life (1972)
- Alexander in the Land of Mog (1973)
- Heaven on Earth (1975)
- A Loving Eye (1977)
- The Honey Tree (1978)
- The Summer People (1980)
- Secret Places (1981)
- The Incompetent Dragon (1982)
- The Country of Her Dreams (1982)
- Magic (1983)
- The Italian Lesson (1985)
- Dr Gruber's Daughter (1986)
- The Sadness of Witches (1987)
- The King Awakes (1987)
- The Empty Throne (1988) – sequel to The King Awakes
- Life on the Nile (1989)
- The Sword and the Dream (1989) – reissue of The King Awakes + The Empty Throne
- Necessary Rites (1990)
- The Noise from the Zoo and Other Stories (1991)
- City of Gates (1992)
- Figures in the Sand (1994)
