= Leslie Thomas =

Welsh writer (1931–2014)

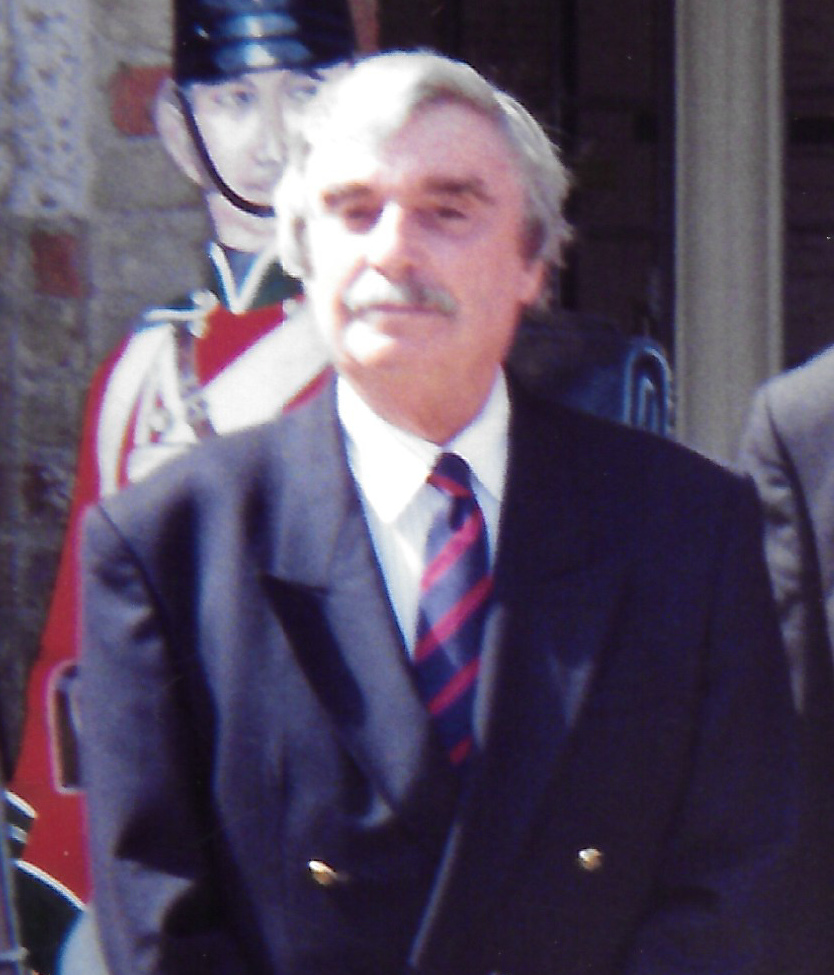
Leslie Thomas in 1995

Leslie Thomas, OBE (22 March 1931 – 6 May 2014) was a Welsh author best known for his comic novel The Virgin Soldiers.

== Early life ==
Thomas was born in Newport, Monmouthshire, Wales. His parents were David James Thomas and Dorothy Hilda Court who married in 1912.

He had three brothers. He was orphaned in 1943 at the age of 12, when his mariner/stoker father was lost at sea and his mother died only a few months later from cancer. He was subsequently brought up in a Dr Barnardo's home. The story of this upbringing was the subject of his first book, This Time Next Week.

Thomas attended Kingston Technical School and he then took a course in journalism at South-West Essex Technical College in Walthamstow. In 1949 he was called up for National Service and embarked on a two-year tour of duty in Singapore with the Royal Army Pay Corps. While there he was briefly involved with the military action against communist rebels in the Malayan emergency. He also began to write short articles for publication in English newspapers.

== Career ==
Upon his return to England in 1951, Thomas resumed his work for the local newspaper group in north London where he had worked before his National Service, but within five years he was working for the Exchange Telegraph news agency, now Extel, and eventually with the London Evening News newspaper, first as a sub-editor, later as a reporter. He stayed with the Evening News until 1965, when he embarked full-time on his writing career.

In 1984, Thomas published In My Wildest Dreams recounting his childhood in South Wales, his days in Doctor Barnardo's homes in London, his National Service in the Far East, and his career in journalism. His novels about 1950s British National Service such as The Virgin Soldiers spawned two film versions, in 1969 and 1977, while his Tropic of Ruislip and Dangerous Davies, The Last Detective have been adapted for television (the former as Tropic in 1979 and the latter having also spawned a film version, in 1981 and a TV series in 2003 with Peter Davison).

He was a subject of the television programme This Is Your Life in 1979 when he was surprised by Eamonn Andrews at a Barnardo's hostel in Kingston, Surrey.

His experiences as a British Army conscript in the Far East during the height of the Malayan emergency were recalled when he appeared in the BBC Radio 2 documentary Caught in the Draft in 1985. He joined ex-RAF national serviceman Bob Monkhouse and BBC Radio 2 drivetime presenter John Dunn in a programme filled with reminiscences about their years in uniform. He was also featured in the short-lived BBC One show Time of My Life in 1983. The show was presented by Noel Edmonds and Thomas was reunited with National Service colleague Reg Wilcock for the first time in 32 years. They duetted on "Tumbling Tumbleweeds", a song they used to sing frequently at the Liberty Club in Singapore.

Thomas was the subject of the first edition of BBC Wales' series Great Welsh Writers, broadcast on BBC One Wales on 25 February 2013. The programme featured interviews with Thomas, Peter Grosvenor, Frederick Forsyth and Tim Rice, as well as archive clips from earlier programmes.

== Honours ==
In the 2005 New Year Honours, he was made an Officer of the Order of the British Empire for services to literature.

He died in Salisbury after a lengthy illness on 6 May 2014, aged 83.

== Bibliography ==
Biographical

- This Time Next Week (1964) ISBN 9780140144284
- In My Wildest Dreams (1984) ISBN 9780851406398

Novels

- The Virgin Soldiers (1966)
- Orange Wednesday (1967)
- The Love Beach (1968)
- Come to the War (1969)
- His Lordship (1970)
- Onward Virgin Soldiers (1971)
- Arthur McCann and All His Women (1972)
- The Man with the Power (1973)
- Tropic of Ruislip (1974)
- Stand Up Virgin Soldiers (1975)
- Bare Nell (1977)
- Ormerod's Landing (1978)
- That Old Gang of Mine (1979)
- The Magic Army (1981)
- The Dearest and the Best (1984)
- The Adventures of Goodnight and Loving (1986)
- Orders for New York (1989)
- Evening News Short Stories (1990)
- The Loves and Journeys of Revolving Jones (1991)
- Arrivals and Departures (1992)
- Running Away (1994)
- Kensington Heights (1996)
- Chloe's Song (1997)
- Other Times (1999)
- Waiting for the Day (2003)
- Dover Beach (2005)
- Soldiers and Lovers (2007)

Dangerous Davies novels

- Dangerous Davies, the Last Detective (1976)
- Dangerous in Love (1987)
- Dangerous by Moonlight (1993)
- Dangerous Davies and the Lonely Heart (1998)

Travel

- Some Lovely Islands (1971) ISBN 978-0330026260
- Hidden Places of Britain (1981) ISBN 0851405428
- A World of Islands (1993) ISBN 0413676609

Miscellaneous

- Midnight Clear: A Christmas Story (1978) ISBN 9780851402918
- Almost Heaven: Tales from a Cathedral (2010) ISBN 9781903071236

TV scripts

- A Piece of Ribbon (1963)
