= Holby City series 14 =

Holby City
- Series 14
- No. of episodes: 52

Release
- Original network: BBC One
- Original release: 18 October 2011 – 9 October 2012

Series chronology
- ← Previous; Series 13 Next → Series 15

The fourteenth series of the British medical drama television series Holby City began airing in the United Kingdom on BBC One on 18 October 2011 and concluded on 9 October 2012. The series ran for 52 episodes.

== Episodes ==
No. overall	No. in series	Title	Directed by	Written by	Original release date	Viewers (millions)
580	1	"Keep on Keeping On"	Rob Evans	Gillian Richmond	18 October 2011	5.48
Director of Surgery Henrik Hanssen (Guy Henry) learns that Holby City Hospital's chance of becoming an NHS foundation trust has been jeopardised by a recent scandal within the plastic surgery department by Michael Spence and the late Sunil Bhatti. Staff nurse Elizabeth Tait (La Charné Jolly) returns from compassionate leave following the death of her mother. Trainee nurse practitioner Chrissie Williams (Tina Hobley) must prove herself to senior nurse Eddi McKee (Sarah-Jane Potts), who is responsible for signing off her management module, but Chrissie's personal life begins to interfere with her professional priorities.
581	2	"Culture Shock"	Rob Evans	Rebecca Wojciechowski	25 October 2011	5.73
Sahira (Laila Rouass) nearly resigns in protest over Hanssen's new management regime but soon relents when she finds out how much pressure her mentor is under. Chantelle's (Lauren Drummond) day gets off to a terrible start when she crashes into Ric's (Hugh Quarshie) car! Sacha (Bob Barrett) hides the results of a patient's CT scan, however Chrissie suspects Sacha knows more than he's letting on, she goes behind his back to prove the patient's diagnosis is wrong.
582	3	"Shame"	Matt Carter	Graham Mitchell	1 November 2011	5.69
Michael (Hari Dhillon) comes back to Holby for his disciplinary hearing and tries to clear his name. Jac (Rosie Marcel) wants to further her career by doing a research project and chooses Ollie (James Anderson) to help her, but he gets the upper hand over Jac after finding out some disturbing information about her. Ric and Michael argue about a patient's treatment. Chrissie decides to be honest with Dan (Adam Astill) plus, Greg (Edward MacLiam) and Sahira's relationship takes a new turn.
583	4	"Under the Skin"	Matt Carter	Rob Williams	8 November 2011	5.63
Jac fights to save a baby called Freya and performs emergency surgery on her after consulting Elliot (Paul Bradley). New trauma registrar Luc Hemingway (Joseph Millson) arrives on AAU ruffles Eddi. Eddi has to put AAU into lock down after a patient with T.B. is admitted. Oliver decides to join Dan's firm as an F2, after watching him whilst getting some research for his project.
584	5	"Devil in the Detail"	Paul Gibson	Marc Pye & Martha Hillier	15 November 2011	5.12
Michael persuades a patient to go private after their operation is cancelled twice by the Theatre Liaison Manager. Sahira has problems trying to get an operation for a patient with learning difficulties. Sahira confronts Hanssen over it. Jac doesn't want to see abandoned baby Freya get fostered out and asks Sahira to help her. Agency nurse Stephen Hopewell is admitted to AAU after a fall. Dan panics and tries to get him discharged, while in the process delegating all his work to Oliver.
585	6	"No Shortcuts"	Paul Gibson	Stuart Morris	22 November 2011	5.51
Malick (Jimmy Akingbola) decides to spend the day on AAU after hearing about Michael's resignation and works with Luc on a case. Malick's ego gets in the way and when a patient crashes in theatre, Malick has to call for Michael. Sahira has had enough of Greg but they patch things up after working together on a pregnant patient. Dan's in Miami on a conference, so Oliver assists Ric on a patient with orthopaedic and general surgical complications.
586	7	"See You on the Ice"	David Innes Edwards	Dana Fainaru	29 November 2011	4.74
Sahira confronts Hanssen about the chaos that exists in their department, but Hanssen refuses to intervene and keeps his distance. When a complex trauma patient comes in, Sahira gets Hanssen involved and tries to make him understand that they need back as a proper leader. Michael is put to the test when Rose Stanley (Lauren Crace), a plastics patient, is readmitted. Chrissie wants to know why Greg isn't Dan's best man. Greg feels sidelined - but will Dan have to guts to tell Chrissie all?
587	8	"The Hand That Bites"	David Innes Edwards	Lauren Klee	6 December 2011	5.41
Hanssen has arranged a conference in Stockholm for him and Sahira to attend but Sahira has to pull out because it's her wedding anniversary, so Hanssen makes her work instead. Chrissie's got another exam to take as well as a bridal fitting, but is distracted by Dan's sexuality. Will she be able to deal with the situation? Chantelle's change of attitude puts a patient at risk after her driving test results are abysmal.
588	9	"Personal Injury"	Clive Arnold	Tahsin Güner	13 December 2011	5.55
Malick's ex boyfriend Paul and his family are involved in an accident, bringing them to Holby. Malick is surprised by the feelings he still has for Paul. Paul is ill, so Malick suggests a risky operation, but when reality hits, Malick he is left to wonder whether he's gone too far. Baby Freya still continues to break through Jac's defences. Jac lies to social services in order to keep baby Freya in hospital when Freya's mother returns. Chrissie tries to convince herself that she and Dan are on the right track.
589	10	"Half Empty"	Clive Arnold	Andrew Holden	20 December 2011	4.96
Malick's interests conflict when treating his ex-boyfriend, Paul. Chrissie longs for a happy ending after recent events with Dan. Jac has a new F1, on whom she takes out her frustration following the departure of baby Freya.
590	11	"Wise Men"	Rob Evans	Justin Young	27 December 2011	5.93
Elliot is in Kyiv, supposedly giving a lecture. It transpires that he has been brought out to carry out a risky operation and is left with a dilemma, enlisting help from Michael Spence, who has by now served out his resignation, and former F1 Frieda Petrenko (Olga Fedori). Back in Holby, Sacha supports Chrissie following her break-up with Dan.
591	12	"When the Hangover Strikes"	Jamie Annett	Joe Ainsworth	3 January 2012	5.47
Eddi and Luc clash on AAU after a difference of professional opinion. After a complicated operation, Ollie longs to leave Dan's team on orthopaedics and return to Darwin, where his heart truly lies. Sahira and Greg work on Darwin, aware that one patient is a mystery shopper. Among their patients are a hypnotist and a hypochondriac.
592	13	"Hide Your Love Away"	Jamie Annett	Rebecca Wojciechowski	10 January 2012	5.23
Greg is left in charge of the ward when Indy falls ill and Sahira has to pick him up. When there is an RTA involving a woman and young child, Greg panics, believing it to be Sahira. Kind and loving Chantelle is put under pressure by Malick when he tells her Holby is running for Foundation Trust Status. Chantelle has to get rid of a persistent patient who has been discharged, but feels guilty when she finds out the patient has cancer. After Eddi and Luc's clash on AAU, Frieda is unhappy to learn she has to work with Luc.
593	14	"She's Electric"	Sean Glynn	Martha Hillier	17 January 2012	5.38
Greg tries to confront Sahira about his feelings for her but she pushes him away. She reveals she intends to leave Holby, but Greg feels he cannot let her go without her knowing how he feels. On AAU, Eddi cannot wait to get away from Luc, by transferring to Keller, but when a young patient is admitted she becomes too involved. There is a power cut on AAU, and Eddi is forced to work alongside Luc in order to save a patient's life. Hanssen has finally achieved Foundation Trust status, so is taken aback when Ric asks him what his next grand plan is, Hanssen improvises, realising he doesn't have one.
594	15	"Butterflies"	Sean Glynn	Paul Matthew Thompson	24 January 2012	5.07
Sahira desperately tries to fight her feelings for Greg, but needs his help on a complex heart operation. Greg volunteers to help Sahira on a conference after Hanssen backs down, together they get funding for the Cardiac Trauma Unit. A testing case arrives on Keller and puts everyone under pressure. When Ric discovers there are complications involving consent in the case, he refuses to go ahead until all the issues are solved, but Chantelle is caught in the crossfire. Time is ticking away for Frieda to complete her F1 portfolio on AAU, with no other consultant available, she asks Michael. Michael, who cannot leave HolbyCare, doesn't want to be in Hanssen's bad books as soon as he's come back, so will he let Frieda fail?
595	16	"Here and Now"	David Innes Edwards	Matthew Bardsley	31 January 2012	5.24
Greg struggles to keep his distance from Sahira. Whilst working on an RTA together, Hanssen learns of Sahira's desire to leave. Sahira battles her decision, will she be able to leave the Cardiac Trauma Unit? And how far will Hanssen go to keep her at Holby? Frieda's insecurity about her abilities grow when another F1 is admitted. When Frieda is summoned to Hanssen's office to collect her results, she can only assume it's bad news. When Chrissie and Sacha return, Dan is forced to work with all loved up couple. He acts like he is fine with it all, but how long can Dan convince her he is OK with their burgeoning relationship?
596	17	"The Best Man"	David Innes Edwards	Martha Hillier	7 February 2012	5.57
Michael realises he has competition for the role of AAU clinical lead with the arrival of consultant Alex Broadhurst. Oliver connects with a grieving patient who has heart problems, though Greg fails to recognise the skills that Oliver has gained under Jac's mentorship. Dan deals with a stubborn patient who has turned her back on her upbringing. Her need to protest against war has put her health at risk. Dan finds it difficult to understand her stance, but soon sees that she has a determination he lacks.
597	18	"Awarded"	John Howlett	Matthew Barry	14 February 2012	5.37
Oliver is looking forward to the awards ceremony, dreaming of what if he and Jac win the award for their research project. However, when he's later faced with the dilemma of surgery or attending the awards, it is a race against time to achieve both. Chantelle wants her Valentine to be the doctor of the same name, but misinterprets Lleucu's good intentions when she sees the young nurse whispering in Oliver's ear. When she then sees the damaging effects that 'love' can have on some people, she realises what to do in order to get 'closure'. Sacha's plan to give Chrissie everything she wants goes awry when he discovers he can't access the money he needs through his pension fund, so he takes drastic measures to secure the necessary funds.
598	19	"What You Wish For"	John Howlett	Philip Ralph	21 February 2012	4.65
Greg excitedly looks forward to Sahira's return, but is devastated when Sahira introduces him to the new anaesthetist on Darwin: Rafi Raza, her husband. Keen to keep his distance from Sahira, Greg brings forward his surgery with a 16-year-old patient, but when complications arise in surgery Greg is left wondering if he put his own needs before the patient's and misjudged the situation. Meanwhile, still struggling with his own sexuality, Dan uses Frieda to prove his importance and ability to Malick, but when Frieda discusses his patient with Malick and performs a procedure without him, Dan demands Hanssen steps in.
599	20	"Fight the Good Fight"	Matt Carter	Justin Young & Paul Matthew Thompson	28 February 2012	5.61
Hanssen has meetings all day with the university vice-chancellor and the board. When he and the vice-chancellor disagree over whether Dan or Malick should be considered for the position of clinical skills teacher, Hanssen realises he might not be completely in control of Holby's future. Meanwhile, Elliot is faced with a dilemma when he is told he is not allowed to operate on a critically ill patient from Ukraine. Refusing to bow to rules and regulations, Elliot goes ahead with a risky surgery in a bid to save the patient's life. Sasha is forced to reveal that he has been moonlighting in Holbycare when one of his patients turns up unexpectedly on Keller.
600	21	"Fresh Blood"	Matt Carter	Rob Kinsman	5 March 2012	4.95
New F1 Tara ruffles feathers with her over keen attitude. As she takes on too much she nearly kills a patient and starts to doubt whether she should be a doctor after all. Oliver eventually takes pity on her and gives her some encouragement to stay in the job. Eddi discovers there is more to Luc than meets the eye when his friend turns up on the ward claiming to be in pain. Luc is reluctant to treat him knowing that Eddi is probing Roy to get more info on his private life. When Roy's life hangs in the balance, Eddi sees a more vulnerable side to Luc. Chantelle upsets Lleucu when she books a holiday to Ibiza with the girls instead of laying down a deposit on the flat that she is sharing with her colleague. Lleucu gives Chantelle an impossible deadline, which causes a rift between the two women.
601	22	"The Ties That Bind"	Clare Holman	Graham Mitchell	13 March 2012	5.00
Sahira is feeling the pressure of working with Greg and Rafi on Darwin. As Greg and Rafi's friendship grows, Sahira's relationship with her husband is worse than ever, especially when she expects him to deal with a problem at home whilst they are both at work. When Sahira finally breaks down after a difficult case on Darwin, it is Greg she turns to, full of remorse for how she has treated him, and tormented by her feelings for him. Greg cannot bear to see Sahira so unhappy; what will he decide to do?. Malick cannot believe his luck when Hanssen offers him the opportunity to become Holby's Clinical Skills Teacher. However, when Hanssen then asks Malick to fast-track a patient's care in order to free up beds in Keller, Malick is conflicted. Will he stand up to Hanssen and risk antagonising the job opportunity? Eddi's brother, Liam, turns up at Holby desperate for her help. He reminds Eddi of everything she has tried to leave behind; can she turn her back on him again?
602	23	"Eastern Promise"	Clare Holman	Joe Ainsworth	20 March 2012	5.05
Elliot tries to persuade Hanssen and the hospital board to send disused surgical equipment to Ukraine rather than throwing it away - but must also find time to treat a long-standing patient. Eddi receives help from an unlikely source as she struggles to monitor Liam, while Frieda has trouble answering Tara's seemingly endless stream of questions.
603	24	"Got No Strings"	Daikin Marsh	Nick Fisher	27 March 2012	4.52
Michael is struggling to accept that Alex is the clinical lead on AAU, made all the more difficult because she is taking all the interesting cases. When a repatriated patient comes in from The Gambia, Michael refuses to be shut out, but his diagnosis and Alex's are completely different. As the patient declines, will the two consultants be able to work together to save her life? Rafi and Sahira are trying to spend some time together, but when Hanssen manipulates Sahira into forgoing a night out with her husband for a tricky operation, Rafi decides that enough is enough. Elsewhere, Lleucu is excited about moving in with Chantelle, but she doesn't know that the move-in date clashes with Chantelle's Ibiza holiday. Once the truth is revealed, will the two girls manage to salvage their friendship without alienating their patient?
604	25	"Throw In The Towel"	Daikin Marsh	Sean Cook	3 April 2012	4.87
Hanssen takes Sahira off CTU but she is determined not to let him control her. Rafi confronts her about Greg, and she is overwhelmed with the pressures being placed upon her. Malick has been preparing for the Clinical Skills interviews, but Dan thinks he has it all sewn up. It is Alex's last day on AAU and Michael is surprised to find that he is sorry to see her go. But then he discovers that she is writing a report on him for Hanssen.
605	26	"Equilibrium"	Reza Moradi	Patrick Homes	10 April 2012	5.05
Sahira's relationship with Rafi is troubled, and she is forced to decide between her career at Holby and her marriage. Luc promises Liam he will support him at a Youth Offender's Court hearing but fails to turn up, and the distress he causes makes him realise his responsibilities as a mentor. Tara learns to cope with death as part of the job when she has to contend with the loss of her first patient.
606	27	"Ribbons"	Reza Moradi	Martha Hillier	17 April 2012	5.01
It is Sahira's last day at Holby, but Hanssen is still finding it difficult to let her go. As the pair argue over a patient's care, it's clear that things are still very much unresolved between them. Meanwhile, Malick has been throwing his weight around Keller ever since he was appointed Clinical Skills Teacher. He takes on a tricky case against Ric's advice and is left questioning if he's bitten off more than he can chew. Elsewhere, working with Luc on AAU, Eddi finally feels that she might be beginning to understand the man. But that's only until he does something completely unexpected.
607	28	"Half A Person"	Jamie Annett	Matthew Broughton	24 April 2012	5.13
Juggling his new role with caring for his patients, Malick realises that teaching is about more than just impressing students. Meanwhile, when Greg becomes emotionally involved with a young patient's situation, will he be able to maintain his professionalism as a doctor? Elsewhere, Michael is surprised when ex-wife Annalese (Anna-Louise Plowman) turns up at Holby to give him some unexpected news.
608	29	"Coercion"	Jamie Annett	Martha Hillier	1 May 2012	4.92
Greg puts his career at risk when he is unable to distance himself from a patient, and is forced to confront uncomfortable truths from his past. Malick struggles to stay focused on the ward as he worries about a serious complaint made against him but the situation is resolved by Holby's newest consultant Serena Campbell (Catherine Russell). Michael makes plans to spend a day off with his daughter Jasmine - only for work to get in the way once again.
609	30	"A Woman's Work"	Sean Glynn	Justin Young	8 May 2012	3.92
It's Serena's first day on Keller and despite Malick's warnings, Ric is convinced that he will be able to handle her. When they clash over a patient's care, will Ric be able to find a way to work with her? Meanwhile, Tara is keen to impress Jac and jumps at the chance to help her with a difficult patient. However, when she ends up making matters worse, she is terrified of Jac's wrath and goes to Elliot for help. On AAU, Eddi is bemused by Luc's nonchalant behaviour. Determined to prove that she is as laid back about their kiss, she flirts with a patient's brother - only to be accused of unprofessional behaviour.
610	31	"Wolf's Clothing"	Sean Glynn	Lauren Klee	15 May 2012	5.02
When medical student Ella Barnes decides to quit her AAU rotation, Sacha is determined to prove to her that she has got what it takes, but things turn nasty between patients, with Sacha caught in the crossfire, leading to him bleeding out on the floor of AAU. Darwin is ushering in a new era of technology and Elliot is under pressure to keep up, though is thrown into doubt about his future at Holby. On Keller, Frieda is caught between Ric and Serena as they both jostle for theatre time. Fed up with playing games, she makes a surprising decision about her future.
611	32	"Double Bubble"	David Innes Edwards	Martha Hillier & Paul Campbell	22 May 2012	4.64
Darwin welcomes the new transplant team, registrar Mo Effanga (Chizzy Akudolu) and charge nurse Jonny Maconie (Michael Thomson), but Jac is not happy about the attention they receive. Chrissie is refusing to leave Sacha's bedside, despite Michael's pleas for her to leave the ward. She gets stuck into work, but when it all gets too much, will she admit that she's not coping? Dan is surprised when an old college friend, agency nurse Simon, starts working on Keller and he begins to recognise just how many changes he has made in his life.
612	33	"Kids' Stuff"	David Innes Edwards	Joe Ainsworth	29 May 2012	4.68
Malick clashes with Serena over a patient's care, but is unnerved when she responds by giving him full responsibility for the case. Jonny infuriates Jac by doubting her diagnostic skills, and Sacha is concerned when his daughter Rachel arrives on the ward complaining of abdominal pain - but Chrissie thinks she is taking advantage of his good nature to play truant.
613	34	"Last Day on Earth"	Daikin Marsh	Tahsin Güner	5 June 2012	4.89
A transplant patient, Jenny, jeopardises her chances of receiving a life-changing operation, but Tara is determined to ensure she gets the care she needs - even if it means putting her own career at risk. However, her plan also puts Oliver in the firing line. Meanwhile, Serena struggles to remain composed when her daughter arrives on the ward in a heavily intoxicated state.
614	35	"Unsafe Haven (Part 1 of 2)"	Simon Meyers	Patrick Homes	12 June 2012	4.46
Luc faces the harsh truth about his fractious relationship with Eddi as he struggles to communicate with her. Ollie covers for Tara when she makes a mistake with a patient, but learns the dangers of letting personal feelings affect his work. Meanwhile, Dan endures a difficult day on the ward and tries to find the courage to stand up for himself.
615	36	"Unsafe Haven (Part 2 of 2)"	Simon Meyers	Dana Fainaru	19 June 2012	3.34
Luc is determined to redeem himself for missing the diagnosis that led to the legionnaires' disease outbreak, and frantically searches for its source. Elliot has trouble dealing with an eager student, while Dan's new relationship becomes strained when his father is admitted to the ward as a patient. Casualty's Big Mac (Charles Dale) and Dylan Keogh (William Beck) make guest appearances in this episode.
616	37	"Long Way Down"	Simon Massey	Stephen Brady	26 June 2012	4.86
The continued presence of his father on the ward leaves Dan with conflicted feelings about his relationship with Simon. Luc is forced to make a big decision about his future when he is offered a permanent contract, while Tara tries to impress her superiors - but finds she has attracted Hanssen's attention for an entirely different reason.
617	38	"Stepping Up To The Plate"	Simon Massey	Julia Gilbert	3 July 2012	4.78
Chantelle decides to speak up for a patient when an ethical dilemma arises on the ward, but discovers she may have chosen the wrong moment to find her voice. Michael grudgingly answers a last-minute call to come in to work on his son's birthday, while Elliot tries to bolster the confidence of a promising medical student who is considering dropping out.
618	39	"Only You"	John Howlett	Graham Mitchell	10 July 2012	4.81
Simon considers quitting Holby after receiving an ideal job offer in Leeds, leaving Dan worried their relationship might be over. Chrissie is furious when Ella, the medical student whose incompetence nearly killed Sacha, returns to the ward as a patient, while Tara meets Hanssen to discover her fate - but Ollie suspects they may be discussing something else instead.
619	40	"Last Man Standing"	John Howlett	Rebecca Wojciechowski	17 July 2012	4.62
Ollie tries to shut Tara out. Can they admit how they feel about each other? Ric is concerned that Serena does not have a patient's best interests at heart. He betrays Serena to the patient's relative, and Hanssen. In the wake of Luc's departure, Eddi is no mood to pander to anyone and she thinks she has found a kindred spirit in a rebellious patient.
620	41	"From Here To Maternity"	Jamie Annett	Martha Hillier	24 July 2012	4.67
The heavily pregnant Mo begins to feel labour pains, but convinces herself she is fine and prepares to operate on porter who is due to appear in the Olympics opening ceremony. But when the inevitable happens, her birthing partner is delayed and help comes from an unexpected source. Eddi becomes unusually nice in a bid to prove to Sacha she is not upset by Luc's departure, while Serena treats a woman who is keeping the truth about her condition from her partner.
621	42	"Breathless"	Jamie Annett	Kirstie Swain	31 July 2012	3.62
Tara tries to win Jac's support for a research project, but she refers her to Ollie instead - forcing the young doctor to consider how she feels about him. Michael returns from America and clashes with Serena over her non-referral initiative, while Malick is unsure whom to seek guidance from as he tries to care for patients using the new system. (Due to the BBC 2012 Olympics coverage, this episode aired on BBC Two.)
622	43	"Crime and Misdemeanours"	Julie Edwards	Steph Lloyd-Jones	7 August 2012	3.21
Malick struggles with the idea of treating a convicted killer, but softens when he hears the man's side of the story and becomes determined to save him so he can be reunited with his daughter. Eddi is determined to prove she can cope with the new non-referral policy and clear her ward, only for her attempt to be ultra-efficient to backfire when she discharges a seriously ill patient. Jac learns the value of friendship and teamwork when Elliot criticises her for being selfish. (Due to the BBC 2012 Olympics coverage, this episode aired on BBC Two.)
623	44	"You and Me"	Julie Edwards	Peter McKenna	14 August 2012	4.62
Mo is back at work after giving up her baby and insists to Jonny that she is fine. The new non-referral system has Chrissie concerned. She clashes with Serena over getting her patient the right treatment, earning Serena's respect in the process. Hanssen still needs to get Holby into shape financially. He has hired fresh blood, George, to help him achieve his goals. Meanwhile Eddi is annoyed by Chrissie and grows closer to Max.
624	45	"The Devil Will Come"	Matt Carter	Fiona Peek	21 August 2012	4.90
Michael's desire to impress the new business manager looks set to backfire when a full AAU theatre forces him to take desperate measures. Tara rejects offers of help from Elliot and Oliver as she struggles to cope with Jac's brutal regime, but her stubbornness could have unfortunate consequences when a guest patient's diagnosis proves far from routine. A complaint is made against Chantelle, threatening her application for a permanent nursing position on Keller
625	46	"Taxi For Spence"	Matt Carter	Joe Ainsworth	28 August 2012	4.66
Michael at his wits over a new permanent No Referral policy, takes drastic action to get a patient to another hospital, with devastating consequences. Serena and Ric clash over which patient should receive a liver transplant. Mo is disappointed when Jonny can't make her family party and is then furious when she finds out he lied and is actually going away for the weekend with Jac.
626	47	"I'm Sticking With You"	Richard Signy	Dana Fainaru	4 September 2012	4.51
In the aftermath of Ritchie Mooney's death the previous week, Hanssen ends the No Referral policy and demands answers from Michael who sticks to what he believes is the truth rather than take the blame for what happened. Chrissie feels the strain of the Ritchie case and ends up making a mistake with a Patient. Mo and Jac clash over a Jehovah's witness who wants an operation without blood.
627	48	"Devil's Dance"	Richard Signy	Martha Hillier	11 September 2012	4.57
When drugs go missing on the ward, Max is quick to cover and absolve Eddi. However, Sacha is not convinced and has serious concerns about Eddi's mindset. When a Sickle Cell patient then arrives in need of a heavy dose of pain killers, does Max have her best interests at heart - and is Eddi putting her faith in the right friend? Meanwhile, Jac refuses to read Tara's research project until she has finished dealing with a particular patient, but when it takes longer than expected, it interferes with her date with Ollie. Tara realises that she will have to face up to Jac. Can she solve the mystery of the patient she's dealing with, and will she have the courage to turn down Jac's help in order to go with Ollie tonight? Elsewhere, Malick naively thinks that his new students will be a breeze, but is thrown when he realises they get to mark him on his ability as a teacher. Malick tries his own techniques, but an old master has to show him the way.
628	49	"A Crack in the Ice"	Audrey Cooke	Lauren Klee	18 September 2012	4.38
Jac worries the entire hospital is gossiping about her and Jonny, and flies off the handle with Mo after catching her whispering with Ollie. It seems the surgeon is suffering a serious case of self-denial. Eddi disappears for a moment alone with Max - only to be interrupted by the last person she expected to see again - Luc - and Chrissie faces a milestone birthday, but really isn't in the mood for celebrating.
629	50	"Hold on Me"	Audrey Cooke	Martin Jameson	25 September 2012	4.60
Ric, Serena, Michael and George await the outcome of a report into Richie's Mooney's death with Bated breath. Serena and Ric clash again when she introduces streamlined treatment. With Luc making a decision which could affect Max's, Eddi's and his own futures, Sacha finds that more drugs have gone missing from the ward. Jonny and Mo pull a prank on Tara using Ollie's phone.
630	51	"Blood Money"	Paul Harrison	Nick Fisher	2 October 2012	4.93
Hanssen is kidnapped by the son of Richie Mooney who is furious at the compensation money he has received for his father's death. Jac worries that she could be pregnant but when Jonny urges her to do a pregnancy test, she's in no hurry to find out. Chrissie is furious when she finds out that Sacha wants to get married for money reasons.
631	52	"When Sacha Met Chrissie"	Paul Harrison	Justin Young	9 October 2012	4.97
In the last episode of the series, Sacha and Chrissie's attempts to keep their wedding news quiet goes wrong when both his daughters and his mother get wind of the news. Later at the hen night, Chrissie finally snaps and goes to find Sacha. Is the wedding about to be called off? Luc catches Eddi stealing drugs from a patient; will he report her to Michael or help her fight her addiction? Ollie accidentally tells Tara that he loves her.

== Production ==
The series is produced by the BBC and will air on BBC One in the United Kingdom. Johnathan Young is the executive producer, having succeeded Belinda Campbell during series thirteen.

== Cast ==
=== Overview ===
All 16 main characters from series thirteen initially returned - consultant cardiothoracic surgeons Elliot Hope (Paul Bradley) and Jac Naylor (Rosie Marcel), consultant general surgeons Henrik Hanssen (Guy Henry), Ric Griffin (Hugh Quarshie) and Michael Spence (Hari Dhillon), consultant orthopaedic surgeon Dan Hamilton (Adam Astill), cardiothoracic surgical registrars Sahira Shah (Laila Rouass) and Greg Douglas (Edward MacLiam), general surgical registrars Antoine Malick (Jimmy Akingbola) and Sacha Levy (Bob Barrett), Foundation Training 2 doctor Oliver Valentine (James Anderson), Foundation Training 1 doctor Frieda Petrenko (Olga Fedori), senior nurse Eddi McKee (Sarah-Jane Potts), ward sister Chrissie Williams (Tina Hobley), staff nurse Elizabeth Tait (La Charné Jolly) and agency nurse Chantelle Lane (Lauren Drummond).

In November 2011, Joseph Millson was introduced as AAU's new trauma registrar Luc Hemingway. Millson described the character as someone who "winds everybody up" without realising that he is doing so. Young expanded, "Luc is an enigmatic stranger whose diagnostic genius and acerbic wit make him a brilliant doctor but an occasionally infuriating colleague. Joseph's created an intriguing, complex and riveting character who will most definitely bring a new dimension to the AAU ward." New Foundation Training 1 doctor Tara Lo (Jing Lusi) joined the show on 6 March 2012, followed by the introduction of experienced consultant general surgeon Serena Campbell (Catherine Russell), nurse and transplant co-ordinator Jonny Maconie (Michael Thomson) and cardiothoracic registrar Mo Effanga (Chizzy Akudolu) in May 2012.

Several cast members have departed since the beginning of Series 14. Jolly left the show on 25 October 2011 when her character was written out of the show. On 21 October 2011, Rouass announced her intention to leave the show to spend more time with her family. Rouass final scenes will be aired in April or May 2012. On 12 December 2011, MacLiam announced his intention to also depart the series. Rouass departed from the series on 17 April 2012, with MacLiam following on 1 May 2012. Olga Fedori left her role as F2 Frieda Petrenko on 15 May 2012. On 17 May 2012, it was announced that Adam Astill would be leaving the show in July.

Recurring characters have included staff nurses Mary-Claire Carter (Niamh McGrady) and Lleucu Jones (Daisy Keeping), consultant general surgeon and AAU clinical lead Alex Broadhurst (Sasha Behar), who appeared for six episodes in early 2012, and consultant anaesthetist Rafi Raza (Zubin Varla), husband of established character Sahira Shah, who was introduced as part of Laila Rouass' exit storyline.

=== Main characters ===
- Chizzy Akudolu as Mo Effanga (from episode 32)
- James Anderson as Oliver Valentine
- Adam Astill as Dan Hamilton (until episode 39)
- Bob Barrett as Sacha Levy
- Jimmy Akingbola as Antoine Malick
- Paul Bradley as Elliot Hope
- Hari Dhillon as Michael Spence
- Lauren Drummond as Chantelle Lane
- Olga Fedori as Frieda Petrenko (until episode 31)
- Guy Henry as Henrik Hanssen
- Tina Hobley as Chrissie Williams
- La Charné Jolly as Elizabeth Tait (until episode 2)
- Jing Lusi as Tara Lo (from episode 21)
- Rosie Marcel as Jac Naylor
- Edward McLiam as Greg Douglas (until episode 29)
- Joseph Millson as Luc Hemingway (episodes 3−37, from episode 49)
- Sarah-Jane Potts as Eddi McKee
- Hugh Quarshie as Ric Griffin
- Laila Rouass as Sahira Shah (until episode 27)
- Catherine Russell as Serena Campbell (from episode 29)
- Michael Thomson as Jonny Maconie (from episode 31)

=== Recurring and guest characters ===
- Sasha Behar as Alex Broadhurst (episodes 17−25)
- Leander Deeny as George Binns (episodes 44−51)
- Ben Hull as Derwood "Mr T" Thompson (from episode 38)
- Daisy Keeping as Lleucu Jones (until episode 24)
- John Light as Max Schneider (episodes 43−50)
- Niamh McGrady as Mary-Claire Carter
- Paul Nicholls as Simon Marshall (episodes 31−39)
- Zubin Varla as Rafi Raza (episodes 19−27)
