= Dan Hamilton =

- Holby City character
- Adam Astill as Dan Hamilton
- First appearance: "Blue Valentine"; 15 February 2011
- Last appearance: "Only You"; 10 July 2012
- Portrayed by: Adam Astill

In-universe information
- Occupation: Consultant orthopaedic surgeon

Dan Hamilton is a fictional character from the BBC medical drama Holby City, played by actor Adam Astill. He first appeared in the series thirteen episode "Blue Valentine", broadcast on 15 February 2011. Dan is a consultant orthopaedic surgeon, who works in the general surgery ward, Keller. He was created in 2010 and Astill successfully auditioned for the role three months prior to beginning filming in November. Dan has been characterised through his boyish and impulsive nature. He portrayed as a wannabe "ladies' man". New to his role as a consultant, Dan plays up to the stereotype associated with public schooled orthopaedic surgeons. His storylines have developed through a relationship with ward sister Chrissie Williams (Tina Hobley) and a rivalry with registrar Antoine Malick (Jimmy Akingbola), whom he later kisses. The latter has attracted a mixed reaction from critics of the series, who felt it was a repetition of gay story-lines featuring in other serial dramas. In May 2012, it was announced that Astill had decided to leave the series.

== Storylines ==
Dan is introduced a few days into his new role as a consultant and is an old friend of registrar Greg Douglas (Edward MacLiam). He starts mentoring ward sister Chrissie Williams (Tina Hobley), during her nurse consultant training. He has a hard time teaching her the importance of delegation in a consultant role. They become close and later start dating. Chrissie becomes stressed with the pressure of work, so Dan organises a trip abroad. He later realises she wants to relax, so he cancels and his relationship with Chrissie strengthens. The father of Chrissie's child, registrar Sacha Levy (Bob Barret) finds it hard to accept that Chrissie has moved on. The situation worsens when they have conflicting views on medicine. Dan decides to put his surgeon skills to the test when consultant Ric Griffin (Hugh Quarshie) challenges him to complete his list of operations first. Feeling competitive, Dan rushes through an operation and makes an error. He gets Ric to step in to save the patient, with Ric taking the blame. Dan starts to feel like his relationship with Chrissie isn't going anywhere fast, so he invites her around to consummate their relationship. Chrissie is annoyed by Dan pressuring her, he tries to make things right again.

Registrar Antoine Malick (Jimmy Akingbola) begins a rivalry with Dan after he undermines him over the treatment of a patient. Tensions build when he learns that Malick is gay. He secretly treats his injured rugby teammate Sean Foster (Sam Callis) with steroids. Malick and Chrissie criticise his actions and Malick threatens to report him. Sean develops necrotizing fasciitis as a result and Dan is forced to operate, ruining Sean's career. A fight ensues between the two and Dan kisses Malick. He then runs to Chrissie and confesses his love for her. Dan asks Malick to forget the kiss and attempts to avoid him. They are forced to operate together. Dan undermines him in theatre, the pair fight once more. After more competitiveness, Dan ignores Malick's medical advice dangering a patient. Malick is angered by his attitude and punches Dan, injuring his face in the process.

== Development ==
=== Creation ===
Dan was one of several characters introduced during Holby City's thirteenth series, during a period of time that the programme had many established characters written out. Characters such as Dan, Malick and cardiothoracic surgeon Sahira Shah (Laila Rouass) were introduced to fill the gap left by the departures. Series producer Myar Craig-Brown hoped the new characters would become "equally iconic" as their predecessors. Dan was created as a series regular in the occupation of consultant orthopaedic surgeon. Executive producer Belinda Campbell said she was certain Dan would "bring a spark to Holby General in more ways than one." She described his backstory as allowing him an "easy passage through life", but said he would become troubled as his duration progressed. His backstory includes having to repeat his F2 three times, considering a career in Cardiology and a number of failed romances with females. He was also given links to existing character Greg Douglas, as an old friend.

Actor Adam Astill auditioned for the role in August 2010. He was called back for a second audition to meet with the producers. In October he was offered the role and began filming in November. Astill had wanted a role in the show for some time prior to his casting, because he was impressed with the standard of material the programme produces. His schedule was light at first as they eased his character into the series. In early 2011 his workload increased as Dan's storylines developed. Whilst Campbell expressed her delight that Astill was playing the character. Dan's first episode was broadcast on 15 February 2011, which also featured fellow new character Sahira. Astill is currently contracted with the series until November 2011.

=== Characterisation ===
Seemingly self-assured, Orthopod Dan Hamilton gets his kicks from fixing bones and rebuilding people, scoffing at those who consider his job basic medical carpentry. Dan is an obsessive rugby player who enjoyed a traditional middle class upbringing and in turn expects the house, the wife and the career. However, in fleeting moments Dan lacks courage – does this unreconstructed man really know who he is and what he wants?

— BBC Online.

BBC Online described Dan's qualities as being his energetic and enthusiastic nature. However he is flawed by his "boyish and impulsive" manner. Prior to his arrival Astill described him a "charming" man who has the ability "to put his foot in his mouth." However this trait does not stop him finding romance on the ward. Dan has an interest in the sport rugby and captains a team. Dan was first described to Astill as a "sporty, rugby-playing ladies' man", who likes to be perceived as confident, but in reality is not. As a "outwardly and very bullish" male, he tries to play up to the stereotype associated with orthopaedic surgeons. He often emphasises on his sporty public schooled persona. However, Astill opined that Dan has a "heart of gold" – who will often say the wrong thing because he has trouble expressing himself emotionally.

Dan takes a stern approach to medicine. He spent six years at medical school to become a "high-flying consultant". Billed as a "brilliant surgeon", he isn't good at patient management. In his field of orthopaedic surgery, Dan has a tendency to treat the problem rather than attend to the patient's emotional needs. Astill said he is likely to "fix the bone and then just move on to the next piece of surgery." He also opined that Dan should work on his patient skills to better himself. Dan has also proven his worth as a mentor during Chrissie's consultant training and gives his full concentration to the task in hand.

Dan's "ladies' man" status became apparent from his first episode. Prior to working at Holby General, he had a number of failed engagements to woman who he felt "were not quite right." During an interview with Digital Spy, Astill said he believed that Dan is the type of man who would stay faithful in a relationship. He concluded that in general he is not malicious, but "there's a lot of bluster about him and when he's out with the lads he'll perhaps josh and exaggerate about his prowess with the ladies." He does not have a dark past, but his future is set hold many revelations as his storyline takes many twists and turns.

=== Sexuality ===
Dan's first romance begins when Chrissie succumbs to his charm. Astill describes him as being instantly attracted to Chrissie. Dan tries to assert his power over her and ill-advises her on how to run the ward. During their subsequent mentorship, Astill said that Dan tries everything he can "to stay in Chrissie's good books". Chrissie had previously been pursuing a possible romance with Sacha, so his arrival "put a spanner in the works". Astill predicted that Holby City fans would take a disliking to Dan, after he ruins any chance of reconciliation between Chrissie and Sacha. Astill said their working relationship brings them closer together and readies them for a romance.

"It really isn't a 'coming out' storyline. The focus really is on Dan's character. Dan is Mr Conventional – he wants Chrissie, he wants the wife, the house, the career and 2.4 children. It won't be about him coming out and coming to terms with his sexuality. If anything, the kiss with Malick has made him even more determined to try to have a conventional life – because that's what he wants the most."

—Series producer Myar Craig-Brown on Dan's storyline.

Dan and Malick's rivalry builds when Dan's conduct is questioned. When he learns that Malick is homosexual, the tension increases between the pair. Upon discovering Dan's negligence with a patient's treatment, Malick is critical of him. Jimmy Akingbola who plays Malick said "Dan is in the wrong and Malick won't let him forget that." At this point the pair are embroiled in a "showdown" and Dan impulsively kisses Malick. Akingbola said "Malick sees a side to Dan that completely throws him. It's a real shock." Astill had previously stated that his character would not intentionally hurt Chrissie because he was aware that she had been "burnt once or twice before." The BBC said the storyline had a "subtle build-up" and that Malick's sexuality "wrong-footed" Dan. They said that after the revelation, the pair endured a "love/hate relationship". To that point, the storyline had been portrayed with "sensitivity and integrity". They concluded that the future of the story would stay true to following Dan's struggle to come to terms with his sexuality.

Series producer Craig-Brown revealed the "biggest challenge" was to distinguish the storyline from other sexuality plots featured in other dramas. She concluded that it was about Dan's struggle with "trying to deal with what he wants, which is a very conventional life." She also confirmed it would be a long-running story arc for the character. Astill also shared her sentiment stating it was a "new direction" for the programme. He said it would be easy for Dan to "come out" if he knew what he wanted. Hobley later revealed Dan is "moving things too fast", which has a negative effect on her training. He is annoyed with Chrissie when Malick offers her theatre slots. She added "Dan doesn't respect what she is trying to do [...] Dan's reaction makes her see red". Hobley revealed that Dan's affair begins to come between them – "so when she finds out what Dan has been up to under her nose all hell is going to break loose."

Dan gave Chrissie the impression he was homophobic. Astill said that his actions to a certain extent, were homophobic. He covered up his feelings because he did not like them. Astill and Akingbola filmed "technical" fight scenes which followed, which resulted in Dan having noticeable injuries to his face. At this point Holby City played out the first possible reveal moment. Chrissie tried to find out why they had fought, with Malick nearly telling the truth. Hobley said that you think, "Oh my God, he’s going to tell her!" Malick blackmailed him to keep quiet or he would tell Chrissie the truth. They both prevented director of surgery Henrik Hanssen (Guy Henry), from finding out the truth. As the first time they began to cooperate, Astill said they gave him a "pathetic excuse" and formed a "united front".

Dan disrespected Chrissie's career aspirations once again and she became "slightly suspicious" of him. Hobley said there is no future for the two of them. Though Astill wasn't so sure but said he hoped Dan would transform into a "bisexual predator — and no man or woman is safe from him." In July 2011, Astill began to worry about public opinion of Dan. He hoped viewers would realise that Dan was not "a bad person" but rather "a tortured soul." At this point Dan and Malick were a long way off romance. Any feelings he had were "buried so deep he refused to believe they exist."

=== Departure ===
In early May 2012, Astill told Joanne Lowles from TVTimes that he was leaving the series. He said that he was pleased with Dan's exit storyline because he "becomes the happiest we've ever seen him, he's comfortable in his own skin and relaxed." He later told Digital Spy's Kilkelly that he had "loved" working on the show but wanted to pursue new projects. Although he did not rule out a return in the future. While a BBC representative explained that the dynamic between Dan and Simon Marshall (Paul Nicholls) would develop and result in "Dan having to decide once and for all which path he follows". They added that Astill is a "brilliant actor" and had contributed much to Dan's storylines during his tenure.

== Reception ==
Prior to Dan's first kiss with Malick, Jane Simon of The Mirror stated that there was "a rather massive surprise in store and even if you've seen it coming a mile off, it's got OMG stamped all over it." Inside Soap's Katy Moon similarly wrote there was "one hell of a shock" coming up, which was "certainly worth waiting for". In reference to Dan's clash with Malick, Simon opined, "You can practically hear their antlers locking, as the tension between them is unbearable." Simon's Mirror colleague Jim Shelley described the kiss as "Not exactly Oliver Reed & Alan Bates", in reference to a homoerotic fight scene in the film Women in Love. Though What's on TV recommended the episode, the accompanying review criticised the "seriously irritating banter between the pair," and ensuing "macho posturing between the orthopaedic surgeon and mouthy Malick." Some viewers complained about the kiss to the BBC discussion programme Points of View, dismayed that Holby City was "following the trend" of depicting gay relationships.

Though the number of complaints were not publicised – The BBC defended the storyline explaining that, "Holby City aims to reflect real life in the setting of a medical drama and this means telling stories about characters from many different backgrounds, faiths, religions and sexualities. We approach our portrayal of same-sex relationships in the same way as we do heterosexual relationships and aim to ensure depictions of affection or sexuality between couples are suitable for pre-watershed viewing." Frances Ryan of The Guardian responded, "Whether said complainers thought that the onscreen depiction of straight people or indeed the interaction of humans generally was similarly a compliance to fantastical trends remains unseen".

Anthony D. Langford of gay media website AfterElton.com was left undecided in his view, by the storyline's beginning. He opined that Astill and Akingbola had chemistry, that the characters' scenes were "intense and combustible," and that the fight and following kiss were terrifically acting, due to the amount of "passion and heat and rage". However, he expressed concern that the same type of storyline had been attempted in soap operas on multiple occasions. He predicted that Dan would be in denial for week and cause fights with Malick. Langford concluded: "I suspect that Malick and Dan will eventually embark on a secret affair, Chrissie will find out, there will be more denials and fighting and at some point Dan will accept who he is. Still, despite the tired storyline, the characters are complex and appealing and the writing is solid enough to make me overlook that." Langford later said "Dan isn’t a very likable character" and is a "complete jerk" because of his sexuality issues. He also questioned Dan's medical skills, bemoaning it unrealistic that his "unethical behavior" has not been noticed within the hospital. He also admitted his confusion to why a "self-assured guy like Malick" would get involved with Dan. Though he praised Dan's revelation of his backstory. D Langford later said Dan's behaviour needed to be addressed because there was a danger the story would "lose its integrity."
