= Holby City series 13 =

Holby City
- Series 13
- No. of episodes: 52

Release
- Original network: BBC One
- Original release: 19 October 2010 – 11 October 2011

Series chronology
- ← Previous; Series 12 Next → Series 14

The thirteenth series of the British medical drama television series Holby City began airing in the United Kingdom on BBC One on 19 October 2010, and ran for 52 episodes, concluding on 11 October 2011.

== Episodes ==
No. overall	No. in series	Title	Directed by	Written by	Original release date	Viewers (millions)
528	1	"Shifts"	Sarah O'Gorman	Justin Young	19 October 2010	6.06
Cardiothoracic consultant Connie Beauchamp (Amanda Mealing) is annoyed to discover she will be sharing the role of Director of Surgery with new recruit Henrik Hanssen (Guy Henry). She makes a presentation to the hospital board outlining her plans for the future, only to have them publicly dismissed by Hanssen. Following the death of consultant Linden Cullen (Duncan Pow), his former partner Faye (Patsy Kensit) is consoled by her ex-husband, registrar Joseph Byrne (Luke Roberts). Joseph is shocked when Faye claims that he is not the father of her unborn child but that Linden is. F2 doctor Penny Valentine (Emma Catherwood) struggles to run the Acute Assessment Unit (AAU) single-handedly, and when general surgeon Michael Spence (Hari Dhillon) fails to make a good impression on Hanssen, he is transferred from general surgery to lead the AAU.
529	2	"The Short Straw"	Sarah O'Gorman	David Lawrence	26 October 2010	5.88
Michael neglects his duties on AAU in favour of his private ward, Holby Care. Hanssen witnesses the disruption on the unit, and causes ructions in the hospital when he announces plans for staff redundancies. Connie discovers that general surgery consultant Ric Griffin (Hugh Quarshie) could be made redundant and attempts to save his job. Nurse Elizabeth Tait (La Charné Jolly) is intimidated by Hanssen and fears being made redundant, though Ric endeavours to help her. Connie is called away from the hospital when her father is involved in a house fire. Before departing, she makes nurse Nicky Van-Barr (Alan Morrissey) redundant, announcing that five other nurses will also be let go.
530	3	"Tough, Love"	Sean Glynn	Martha Hillier	2 November 2010	5.93
Ric's daughter Jess (Verona Joseph) arrives at the hospital, intent on telling her father that she is engaged and pregnant. Ric has been concealing the severity of his cancer from her, and busies himself in his work. He is hospitalised after being exposed to measles and argues with Jess, but the two reconcile when Ric decides to take a leave of absence to concentrate on his health and family. Joseph becomes increasingly concerned about Faye when psychiatrist Sarita Dubashi (Rakhee Thakrar) suggests she may be suffering from depression. Ward sister Chrissie Williams (Tina Hobley) returns from her maternity leave and takes an interest in cardiothoracic surgical registrar Greg Douglas (Edward MacLiam), much to the annoyance of the father of her child, Sacha Levy (Bob Barrett).
531	4	"Queen's Gambit"	Sean Glynn	Philip Gawthorne	9 November 2010	6.00
Following Ric's departure, acting consultant Jac Naylor (Rosie Marcel) hopes to secure his position permanently. When she fails to perform pre-operative checks on a high-risk patient who almost dies in surgery as a result, Jac attempts to blame Chrissie for her mistake. Faye has a public breakdown, and Joseph has her formally sectioned, fearing she has become a risk to herself and their unborn son. Ward sister Donna Jackson (Jaye Jacobs) has to bring her niece Mia (Jada Wallace-Mitchell) into work due to childcare issues, causing problems for her, Elizabeth and nurse Mary-Claire Carter (Niamh McGrady) as they attempt to hide Mia from Hanssen while the AAU is inspected.
532	5	"My No. 1 Fan"	Rob Evans	Rebecca Wojciechowski	16 November 2010	5.95
Michael lets Penny down by delaying writing a report, focusing instead on an upcoming job interview. His actions result in the dismissal of administrator Sheena Clore (Victoria Yeates), but he ultimately decides to stay at Holby General. F2 doctor Oliver Valentine (James Anderson) has difficulty treating the son of an asylum-seeker who refuses to speak. The boy urgently requires a transplant, but is not eligible for NHS treatment. When his condition becomes critical, Oliver explains there is nothing they can do for him. The mother leaves, believing this will influence her son receiving a transplant, but instead he dies within hours. Donna attempts to advise Hanssen against relying on agency nurses. She is briefly swayed by agency nurse Kieran Callaghan (Barry Sloane), and accepts his offer of a drink, but snubs him after concluding that he was using her.
533	6	"Betrayal"	Rob Evans	Lauren Klee	23 November 2010	5.88
Hanssen warns Connie that budget cuts need to be made on the hospital's cardiothoracic ward, Darwin. The job of consultant Elliot Hope (Paul Bradley) is threatened when he conceals the death of a patient's child, causing Hanssen to view him as expendable. Jac attempts to impress Hanssen, but her efforts backfire when a surgical decision she makes results in her patient requiring a stoma bag. When night-shift nurse Frieda Petrenko (Olga Fedori) helps to solve a difficult case, Penny and Michael encourage her to move to AAU's day-shift permanently. She is initially reluctant to work alongside Michael, but agrees when he recognises her skill as a diagnostician.
534	7	"Future Shock"	Paul Gibson	Graham Mitchell	30 November 2010	6.17
Faye goes into labour but refuses to leave the psychiatric ward. The baby is in the breech position and Faye requires an urgent Caesarean, so a panicked Joseph requests help from Jac. Jac realises that Faye fears Joseph will take the baby away from her and, after reassuring her to the contrary, convinces her to leave the ward. Faye gives birth to a healthy baby boy. In his gratitude, Joseph kisses Jac. Chrissie eagerly anticipates a date with Greg, but experiences self-doubt over her post-birth body shape. She concludes that it is the wrong time for her to begin a relationship. Kieran makes a second attempt at winning over Donna. She softens towards him after discovering that he has not been shirking his work duties, as she suspected, but taking 'phone calls from his troubled son.
535	8	"Losing Game"	Paul Gibson	Shazia Rashid	7 December 2010	4.31
Elliot and Connie argue throughout a difficult shift, as Elliot attempts to remain detached from a patient and Connie's father is admitted to the general surgery ward, Keller. When Elliot walks out of an operation, Connie cannot defend him to Hanssen and admits that he has become a liability. Faye is injured attempting to leave the hospital. Joseph halts their divorce proceedings in an effort to support her, and Faye decides to name their son Harry, after Joseph's deceased brother. However, when Joseph realises that Faye intends to return to the psychiatric unit with Harry, he seeks comfort from Jac, and has sex with her in the staffroom. The patient Jac almost killed by neglecting his pre-operative checks makes a formal complaint, and Chrissie panics, believing she is at fault after being set up by Jac.
536	9	"The Lying Kind"	Jamie Annett	Nicola Wilson	14 December 2010	5.82
Connie's father undergoes an operation which proves more difficult than expected. Struggling to deal with his worsening condition, Connie seeks respite in her work. Having completed his surgical rotation on Darwin, Oliver is posted to the AAU. He loses his confidence in theatre and embarrasses himself in front of Michael. Greg is frustrated to be working with Elliot on Darwin, but comes to respect him when Elliot diagnoses an obscure condition. He is shocked to learn of Connie's plan to push Elliot out of his job, and confronts her over her treatment of her former friend.
537	10	"The Most Wonderful Time of the Year"	Jamie Annett	Tony McHale	21 December 2010	6.24
Chrissie, tired out from looking after Daniel, has to face the board over a mistake Jac framed her for. Sacha turns into Chrissie's knight in shining armour and she, at long last, wonders if he could be her "Mr. Right." Penny gets above her station when filling in as registrar for the shift, upsetting Oliver in the process, before coming back down to earth after a talk from Michael. Joseph tries to get Faye re-admitted to the psychiatric ward but she declines. Joseph, left with no choice, decides to invite Faye and Harry to spend Christmas with him, upsetting Jac after promising to spend Christmas with her. Faye makes a mysterious phone call.
538	11	"Snow Queens"	Daikin Marsh	Martha Hillier	28 December 2010	6.67
On Christmas Day, Connie and Faye have some complex choices to make. Connie is taken aback when her father is admitted to Holby for emergency life-saving surgery. While considering where to move with her life, she is thrown into turmoil when a rare heart and lung transplant operation crops up. Jac stops Faye fleeing the United Kingdom with baby Harry, so that she and Joseph can finally sort out their differences once and for all.
539	12	"Running the Gauntlet"	David Innes Edwards	Chris Murray	4 January 2011	6.45
Having beaten up his boss on Day Care Surgical ward, Antoine Malick (Jimmy Akingbola) finds that AAU is now his last chance. He soon ends up rubbing Michael and Penny up the wrong way though. Donna and Kieran show up for work like love's new young dream. Chrissie has to face a disciplinary hearing and she considers leaving the hospital for good. Mark ends up attempting to help her save her job.
540	13	"China in Your Hands"	David Innes Edwards	Martha Hillier	11 January 2011	6.48
Joseph decides to work less so that he can spend more time with Harry but, after Hanssen offers him a promotion, it becomes harder for him to put his family before his career. Joseph ends up deciding to put his family first and decides to quit the hospital for good. Sacha is unable to get back into Chrissie's good books no matter how hard he tries. Penny attempts to convince Frieda to consider applying for an F1 position after she learns she has lost her current job.
541	14	"My Hero"	Michael Keillor	Rob Williams	18 January 2011	6.56
After Elliot discovers Greg and Mary-Claire in a compromising situation, Greg's position at the hospital is put in danger. Greg becomes determined to show Elliot how talented he is, but risks a patient's life in the process. Donna returns to work on the ward but she is still feeling angry and bitter about Kieran. She ends up managing to alienate her staff and angering Mark while damaging a colleague's career. Sacha is devastated after Chrissie decides to distance herself from him.
542	15	"Don't Go Changing"	Michael Keillor	Nick Fisher	25 January 2011	6.06
Mark is stuck in a dilemma: Should he side with Hanssen and choose Elliot or Ric for redundancy? Elliot's bumbling approach trips him up yet again when he goes beyond the duty of care for a patient. Kieran returns and tries to win back Donna, but she decides she needs to offer Mia more stability in her life.
543	16	"Love Thy Neighbour"	Dermot Boyd	Patrick Homes	1 February 2011	6.07
Malick is given charge of the AAU but, to the detriment of patient care, continually ignores Penny's advice. Elliot solves a difficult medical mystery, proving that he is effective in a crisis situation. Frieda undermines Chrissie by suggesting that Mark's intervention kept her from redundancy, but Hanssen shows confidence in her, recommending that she apply for a promotion.
544	17	"Anger Management"	Dermot Boyd	Patrick Homes	8 February 2011	6.27
Ric is forced to step in when Malick and a patient make complaints against each other. Elizabeth finds herself working in Holby Care. Greg gets more than he bargained for as a prank becomes apparent.
545	18	"Blue Valentine"	Fraser MacDonald	Justin Young	15 February 2011	5.89
Despite Jac's attempts to prove she is top dog on Darwin, she is dismayed when new surgeon Sahira Shah (Laila Rouass) arrives on the ward. Meanwhile, Ric's resolve to work on his vocation collides with his health: When granted expensive PCT cancer drugs that are denied to other patients, Ric moves to fight against the Trust.
546	19	"Open Your Heart"	Fraser MacDonald	Nick Fisher	22 February 2011	6.07
Sahira's loyalties become divided between her new colleagues and her association with Hanssen. Donna finds out that Kieran has been injured. Chrissie begins her nurse consultation training with Dan Hamilton (Adam Astill) mentoring her, but finds it hard to take a step back.
547	20	"No Credit, No Blame"	Jamie Annett	Mark Cairns	1 March 2011	6.02
Jac takes advice from Eiliot but soon reverts to her old ways in order to lead an operation. Kieran refuses to give Donna the time of day, leaving Donna wondering whether she can cope with the consequences of war. Oliver sinks to a new low when he tries to blame Penny for his mistake.
548	21	"What You Mean By Home"	Jamie Annett	Nick Warburton	8 March 2011	6.11
Donna decides that she wants to move away with Kieran but struggles with uprooting Mia and leaving both Michael and Ric in the lurch. Sahira's son is taken ill but she finds a surprising ally in Jac. Frieda learns that alienating the nurses isn't a good idea.
549	22	"Too Much Monkey Business"	Reza Moradi	Tony McHale	15 March 2011	5.79
Penny is furious when she finds out that Oliver has pulled the rug out from under her, leading him to spiral out of control. Greg is tired of Sahira throwing her weight around but he ends up making a decision he later regrets. Sacha unwittingly reveals too much information about Chrissie to Dan.
550	23	"Clash of the Titans"	Reza Moradi	Graham Mitchell	22 March 2011	5.90
Ric continues to fight for his livelihood and Hanssen, eventually impressed, decides to operate and remove Ric's tumour. Elliot mistrusts Jac and comes into trouble with Hanssen over a patient. Jac goes above Sahira's head and loses a young patient in surgery, leaving her with some very serious explaining to do.
551	24	"Second Coming"	David Innes Edwards	Joe Ainsworth	29 March 2011	5.49
Ric refuses Hanssen's offer to operate on his tumour, which prompts Hanssen to reveal to Jess that her father's condition is much worse than she knew. Afraid that her unborn child will not grow up to remember his grandfather, Jess persuades Ric to have the operation. Elliot initially refuses to have any involvement with it, believing the risks to be too high, but agrees to assist in theatre for Jess's peace of mind. She goes into labour while Ric is undergoing the operation, and gives birth to a son, Jake. The operation is a success. When Ric regains consciousness, he is introduced to his grandson. On the AAU, Oliver drafts a letter of resignation but, after a successful day working alongside Frieda, decides to repeat his F2 year.
552	25	"Coming Second"	David Innes Edwards	Joe Ainsworth	5 April 2011	5.75
On the day of the Darwin consultancy interviews, Sahira becomes overly-involved in the case of a dying patient and his deaf son. In order to remain with her patient, she misses her interview slot. Consequently, Jac is appointed consultant by default. Malick treats a man with multiple defensive wounds. He claims he has been attacked by his unstable wife. The wife is also admitted to the AAU, and Malick realises that she has been abused. He switches the husband's pain control, morphine, for saline - salt water - as punishment, and encourages the wife to confess the attack to the police as an escape from her marriage. Dan attempts to impress Chrissie with a weekend away in Barcelona, but their patient helps him realise that what she really wants is to relax. He cancels the holiday and makes her a cup of tea, prompting Chrissie to kiss him.
553	26	"Boy Valentine, Girl Valentine"	Daikin Marsh	Dana Fainaru	12 April 2011	5.72
Penny gives Oliver an ultimatum: Either tell Hanssen he's not a qualified doctor, and that he failed his exams, or she will. However Penny dies when she crawls under a train carriage and is crushed while trying to save a victim. As news of the train crash reaches the hospital, Jac's dream of being queen of Darwin is finally realised. Sacha tries and struggles to be happy for Chrissie and Dan.
554	27	"Rebound"	Daikin Marsh	Martha Hillier	19 April 2011	5.72
Malick butts heads with Dan whilst trying to prove his worthiness for a consultant's position. Michael treats an old school-friend who is admitted to the ward. Sahira tries to prove her worth with a complex case after being credited as the one who got too emotionally involved.
555	28	"Crossing The Line"	Fraser MacDonald	Daniella James	26 April 2011	5.63
Michael faces a dilemma when he realises that his department's success could mean the demise of another. He considers crossing over to the dark side in order to secure his department's future. Greg gets emotionally involved in a patient's case but. after treading on Sahira's toes, soon finds himself in a tricky situation.
556	29	"Tunnel Vision"	Fraser MacDonald	Andrew Holden	3 May 2011	5.81
Ric and Dan get competitive when they make a bet to see who can finish their operation list first. As a result, Dan makes a surgical error and requires Ric's help to recitfy it. Frieda has to remove her make-up on the ward when it causes an allergic reaction in a patient. Greg struggles when treating a teenage patient who does not want surgery. This prompts Jac to remove him from the case.
557	30	"My Bad"	Edward Bazalgette	Tahsin Güner	10 May 2011	5.76
Greg feels let down by his team following the death of a patient and proceeds to get drunk. He rejects Sahira's help, and makes a serious error of judgement. Malick continues to try to prove his worth to an unimpressed Ric as he is forced to make a life-saving decision. Chrissie is not happy with Dan's attempts to move their relationship forward.
558	31	"Step On Up"	Edward Bazalgette	Gillian Richmond	17 May 2011	5.68
Elizabeth's grandmother is rushed into the hospital and her attempts to keep a level head only lead to being drawn into a web of dark secrets that set out her past. Sacha is transferred to AAU and soon irritates his colleagues with his management style. Jac is frustrated by Elliot's apparent lack of interest in the encroachment of the plastics department, but learns that he is quietly countering it in his own way.
559	32	"A Greater Good"	Rob Evans	Rob Williams	24 May 2011	5.31
Michael's plastic vision deteriorates as he is dismayed to learn that Sunil is providing their equipment and covering up the conflict of interest. Sacha learns he has to stand his ground when Chrissie and Frieda become exasperated with each other. Ric asks Malick to keep an eye on Elizabeth for the day but is annoyed when Malick and Dan's crossfire escalates.
560	33	"Damage Control"	Rob Evans	Tahsin Güner	31 May 2011	4.26
Dan tries to do the right by his friend who has a knee injury but, when Malick gets involved, he discovers that the entire saga was Dan's fault. This leads to a showdown between the pair. Hassen tries to reignite the old spark between him and Sahira. Frieda attempts to keep her emotions in check after finding out some bad news from her family.
561	34	"Rescue Me"	Dermot Boyd	Kim Revill	7 June 2011	5.46
Elizabeth's attempts to stop her personal life clashing with her work backfires when her mother makes an unexpected appearance at the hospital. Sacha attempts to get AAU under control and impress Hanssen at the same time. Jac is furious when the plastics unit takes up too much time in surgery as she attempts to deal with a life threatening situation.
562	35	"All About Me"	Dermot Boyd	Nick Fisher	14 June 2011	5.33
Jac finds herself caught between Hanssen and Michael. The situation between Malick and Dan continues to escalate when they are forced to operate on a patient together. New senior staff nurse Eddi Mckee (Sarah-Jane Potts) starts her first day with a hangover and is then confronted by her past.
563	36	"In Between Days"	Daikin Marsh	Justin Young	21 June 2011	5.35
In this flashback episode, Oliver confronts his guilt over betraying his sister, and considers confessing everything to Hanssen. Elizabeth's relationship with her mother continues to go downhill, which leads to serious consequences when Ric tries to help.
564	37	"The Bottom Line"	Sean Glynn	Stuart Morris	28 June 2011	5.41
Following a visit, Hanssen is forced to make some dramatic decisions if he wants to keep the department open. Unaware of his kiss with Dan, Chrissie enlists Malick's help. Sacha's attempts to tell nurse Chantelle Lane (Lauren Drummond) that her services are no longer required proves easier said than done.
565	38	"Out on a Limb"	Sean Glynn	Lauren Klee	5 July 2011	5.24
Hanssen discovers how far Sahira will go to save both Darwin and the Trauma Unit, and how far he will go to keep her at Holby. Dan ignores Malick's advice on a patient and is forced to face the consequences when the patient's condition takes a turn for the worse. Chrissie is shocked by Sacha's new outlook on life.
566	39	"Hand In Glove"	Jamie Annett	Sasha Hails & Nick Fisher	12 July 2011	5.37
Dan struggles to cover up the truth about his fight with Malick, especially when Chrissie reports her concerns to Hanssen. Michael attempts to prove his worth in his partnership with Sunil. Sacha attracts the attention of a patient's daughter.
567	40	"Going It Alone"	Jamie Annett	Rebecca Wojciechowski	19 July 2011	5.59
Sahira's trauma unit opens for business but her leadership and her skills are soon tested to the limit. Malick's attempts to help Hassen with an operation leaves him questioning where his priorities lie. Sacha holds a "Doctor Idol" competition to find Penny's replacement on AAU.
568	41	"Sirens"	Rob Evans	Patrick Homes	26 July 2011	5.16
Ric has to tread carefully when Elizabeth's mother is rushed into the hospital in a serious condition. Sahira struggles to keep her emotions in check when Hanssen tries to blackmail her. Eddi has reservations about a new F1 when she arrives late for her first day on AAU.
569	42	"Old Habits"	Rob Evans	Fiona Peek	2 August 2011	5.36
Chrissie becomes increasingly frustrated with Dan trying to organise her life for her and tells him to back off when he accuses her of letting personal feelings get in the way of her work. Sahira questions Greg behaviour when his old childhood friend turns up at the hospital. Michael discovers that Lulu is Sir Fraser's daughter.
570	43	"Walk the Line"	Edward Bazalgette	Dana Fainaru	9 August 2011	5.30
Greg attempts to distance himself from his old school friend but, when he attempts suicide, he is forced to put his own demons aside in order to treat him. Elizabeth's attempts to care for her mother only leads to her mental health continuing to go downhill. Frieda returns from leave and bonds with Eddi over their dislike of Lulu.
571	44	"One of Those Days"	Edward Bazalgette	Emma Goodwin & Patrick Homes	16 August 2011	5.15
Malick's golden opportunity at helping Ric with a kidney transplant ends up clashing with a routine but vital operation. Eddi becomes worried that Sacha is too emotionally involved with a professional snowboarder. A patient tries to make a pass at Hanssen but he is more interested in re-establishing his dream team with Sahira .
572	45	"All Good Things"	Dermot Boyd	Tahsin Güner	23 August 2011	5.30
Hanssen announces that CT at Darwin will be merged with St James's Hospital. Hanssen decides to keep Sahira as a CT surgeon on Darwin and everyone thinks that she has only been kept out of favouritism. Sahira resigns to prove that this is not the case but the threat of unemployment is looming. Meanwhile, Frieda wants to get back to work after her father's death. Elliot tries to prove his surgical skills to St James's.
573	46	"Big Lies, Little Lies"	Dermot Boyd	Peter McKenna	30 August 2011	5.26
Frieda continues to clash with Lulu when she tries to muscle in on her attempts to assist Michael during one of his operations. Chantelle's attempt to help Elizabeth and her mother reconcile backfires when she realises she can't help everybody. Greg continues to avoid his problems by flirting his way through most of the female staff, but Sahira attempts to make him confront his demons.
574	47	"Who Needs Enemies"	David Innes Edwards	Justin Young	6 September 2011	4.78
Michael has a very bad day when he comes under pressure from both Hanssen and Sunil and his day goes from bad to worse when a former patient has complications and is rushed back into hospital. Chantelle lands both her and Elizabeth in hot water with Ric because of a prank. Lulu's attempts to impress Michael ends with her alienating the whole of AAU as well as him.
575	48	"Night Cover"	David Innes Edwards	David Young	13 September 2011	4.98
After Dan struggles to keep his focus during a night shift, he makes a decision about his future with Chrissie and makes a life-changing proposal. Greg faces Hanssen's wrath when he finds out he's covering Sahira's night shift. Eddi deals with the spoilt behaviour of a young patient.
576	49	"Broken"	Jennie Darnell	Patrick Homes	20 September 2011	5.31
Michael comes under more pressure from Sunil and he is not happy when one of his patients comes back to the hospital complaining of a leaking implant. Eddi's friendship with a patient is threatened by his girlfriend. Chanelle's attempt to get Elizabeth to have some fun backfires when her mother is rushed back onto the ward in a serious condition.
577	50	"Everything to Play For"	Jennie Darnell	Nick Fisher	27 September 2011	5.04
Sahira discovers that the implants for the Plastics unit are, in fact, illegal as Sunil's and Michael's lies begin to unravel in front of Hanssen. Elizabeth struggles with her mother's refusal of treatment but both Ric and Chantelle are stunned when she makes a life changing choice. Eddi attempts to distance herself from Josh but blames herself when he overdoes his physio.
578	51	"Oliver Twists"	John Yorke	Joe Ainsworth	4 October 2011	5.42
Sahira finds out that the illegal implants were defective and when the patients find out they lead a fight back against Hanssen and Michael leaving Michael's future in the balance. Fed up of being Jac's lapdog Oliver's commitment to the hospital is soon put to the test. Eddi struggles to keep a professional head as Josh finds out whether he will be able to walk again.
579	52	"PS Elliot"	Daikin Marsh	Joe Ainsworth	11 October 2011	5.12
In the last episode of the series, Hanssen attempts to contain a plastics scandal as Elliot and Greg work their final shifts at Holby. However, when Sunil is rushed in following a car crash, the hospital's dream of Trust status is put on the line. Chrissie delays telling Sacha about her and Dan's engagement with massive consequences. Josh prepares to face the outside world.

== Production ==
The series is produced by the BBC and airs on BBC One in the United Kingdom. It is 52 episodes long, a reduction on the twelfth series which ran for 55 episodes. On 28 May 2010, the BBC announced that it would be launching a high definition (HD) simulcast of BBC One from the autumn, and that Holby City would move to HD by the end of the year. Prior to its HD broadcast, Holby City was produced using Panasonic P2 Varicam camcorders. Coach House Studios purchased a new Avid Unity Media Network to produce the series in HD, also upgrading the Avid Media Composers and Symphony Nitris systems to the latest software version. The series was simulcast on BBC HD beginning with the opening episode, "Shifts", and on the new BBC One HD channel from its launch in November 2010. Danielle Nagler, head of BBC HD, was pleased with the series' HD debut, which she stated was not flawless, but was a "big improvement" on standard definition.

For series thirteen, Myar Craig-Brown became Holby City's series producer, following Diana Kyle, who held the role during the previous series. Craig-Brown had worked on Holby City as a script editor since its fourth series, being promoted to story editor before departing for several years. She then re-applied for a story editor position, and was made acting series producer. The series' consultant producer and lead writer was Justin Young, who was appointed after series creator Tony McHale stood down during series twelve. Young intended to introduce a more writer-led commissioning process, with writers creating more of the theme and story of their episodes than was previously the case. Belinda Campbell initially served as the series' executive producer. In February 2011, it was announced that Holby City's founding producer Johnathan Young would return to the BBC from March, succeeding Campbell as executive producer of both Casualty and Holby City.

== Cast ==
=== Overview ===
The series 13 cast (back left to right) Emma Catherwood, James Anderson, Jimmy Akingbola, Paul Bradley, Rosie Marcel, Guy Henry, Hugh Quarshie, Adam Astill, Bob Barrett, Jaye Jacobs (front left to right) Olga Fedori, Edward MacLiam, Laila Rouass, Hari Dhillon, Tina Hobley, La Charné Jolly

The series began with 16 roles receiving star billing. Connie Beauchamp (Amanda Mealing) and Elliot Hope (Paul Bradley) are consultants on the cardiothoracic surgery ward, Darwin. Ric Griffin (Hugh Quarshie), Michael Spence (Hari Dhillon) and Jac Naylor (Rosie Marcel) are consultants on the general surgery ward, Keller, while Sacha Levy (Bob Barrett) is a locum general surgery registrar. Joseph Byrne (Luke Roberts) and Greg Douglas (Edward MacLiam) are cardiothoracic registrars, and Oliver Valentine (James Anderson) is a F2 doctor working under Greg. Oliver's sister Penny (Emma Catherwood) is also an F2, and works on the Acute Assessment Unit (AAU), alongside sister Frieda Petrenko (Olga Fedori). Faye Byrne (Patsy Kensit) and Donna Jackson (Jaye Jacobs) are also ward sisters, on Darwin and Keller wards respectively, and Elizabeth Tait(La Charné Jolly) is a staff nurse on Keller. Mark Williams (Robert Powell) is the hospital's Chief Executive Officer.

Guy Henry was cast as new joint Director of Surgery and consultant general surgeon Henrik Hanssen, who arrived in the series' first episode. His character is "a bit of a mystery man", apparently sent to the hospital by the Department of Health to make budget cuts. Henry describes him as "punctilious, pedantic and passionate about his work" with a dry sense of humour, and a rival to Connie.

Tina Hobley returned as ward sister Chrissie Williams following four months maternity leave in November 2010, and used her infant son Orson to play Chrissie's son Daniel. Jimmy Akingbola joined the cast in January 2011 as general surgical registrar, Antoine Malick. Laila Rouass was cast as cardiothoracic surgical registrar Sahira Shah, appeared from February 2011. Announcing her casting, Daniel Kilkelly of media entertainment website Digital Spy described Sahira as a rival for Jac and love interest for Greg, who shares a "dark history" with Hanssen. Rouass was able to relate to the role as, like herself, Sahira is a mother attempting to balance her personal and professional lives. Campbell stated that Rouass brought a "fresh new energy" to the series and that Sahira had been a "joy to create", commenting on the character: "While on the surface she appears to be cool and calm, underneath it all, she is kicking madly just to keep afloat. It will be fascinating to explore what is really going on underneath the façade of perfection Sahira has created for herself. I'm sure her character will be someone a lot of viewers will recognise in themselves." Adam Astill was cast as consultant orthopaedic surgeon Dan Hamilton. Former Waterloo Road stars Sarah-Jane Potts and Lauren Drummond joined the cast on 7 June 2011. Potts plays senior staff nurse Eddie McKee and Drummond plays agency nurse Chantelle Lane.

Recurring characters include Holby NHS trust chairman Terence Cunningham (Roger Barclay), staff nurse Mary-Claire Carter (Niamh McGrady), consultant plastic surgeon Sunil Bhatti (Silas Carson), psychiatric registrar Sarita Dubashi (Rakhee Thakrar), agency nurse Kieran Callaghan (Barry Sloane), who served as a love interest for Donna, and Foundation House Officer 1 (F1) Lulu Hutchison (Fiona Hampton).

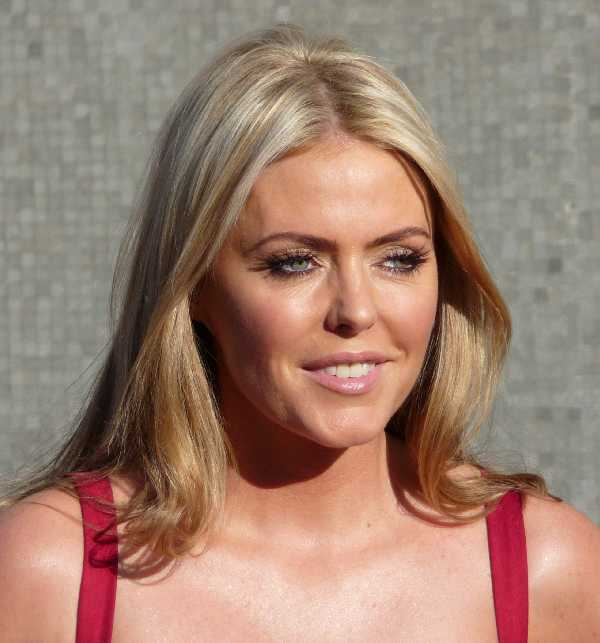
Kensit (pictured) was one of many cast members to depart during the series.

Several cast members departed during the course of the series. Kensit resigned from the show during its twelfth series and departed at the end of 2010, having filmed her final scenes on 8 October 2010. She stated that she had had a "fantastic time playing Faye but [...] felt it was the right time to move on." Mealing resigned during 2010 after six years in the role of Connie. Campbell deemed Mealing "an invaluable asset" to the series, commenting: "She created an iconic character and Connie will not be forgotten. Connie will have a dramatic but heart-warming departure which will tie into the dramatic entrance of an exciting new regular character." Roberts also announced his resignation in 2010, after being cast in Pirates of the Caribbean: On Stranger Tides. He filmed his final scenes for Holby City in September 2010. Quarshie took a break from the series when Ric was written out to recuperate from his cancer treatment. Powell also departed from the series to return to working in theatre, explaining: "I've been there for six years, and that was five years longer than I ever anticipated staying, and it just struck me that it was probably time to move on and go back to [my] roots." Jacobs left the show in March 2011, after seven years playing Donna. As the series had seen the departure of so many cast members, and the introduction of many new ones, Jacobs deemed it "a new era with a new cast", one which she was not part of, and stated that the time felt right to leave. Catherwood departed the following month, when her character Penny was killed off.

=== Main characters ===
- Jimmy Akingbola as Antoine Malick (from episode 12)
- James Anderson as Oliver Valentine
- Adam Astill as Dan Hamilton (from episode 18)
- Bob Barrett as Sacha Levy
- Paul Bradley as Elliot Hope
- Emma Catherwood as Penny Valentine (until episode 26)
- Hari Dhillon as Michael Spence
- Lauren Drummond as Chantelle Lane (from episode 34)
- Olga Fedori as Frieda Petrenko
- Guy Henry as Henrik Hanssen (from episode 1)
- Tina Hobley as Chrissie Williams (from episode 3)
- Jaye Jacobs as Donna Jackson (until episode 21)
- La Charné Jolly as Elizabeth Tait
- Patsy Kensit as Faye Byrne (until episode 11)
- Rosie Marcel as Jac Naylor
- Edward McLiam as Greg Douglas
- Amanda Mealing as Connie Beauchamp (until episode 11)
- Sarah-Jane Potts as Eddi McKee (from episode 34)
- Robert Powell as Mark Williams (until episode 15)
- Hugh Quarshie as Ric Griffin
- Luke Roberts as Joseph Byrne (until episode 13)
- Laila Rouass as Sahira Shah (from episode 18)

=== Recurring and guest characters ===
- Roger Barclay as Terence Cunningham (until episode 44)
- Silas Carson as Sunil Bhatti (episodes 27−52)
- Fiona Hampton as Lulu Hutchison (episodes 40−47)
- Daisy Keeping as Lleucu Jones (from episode 43)
- Niamh McGrady as Mary-Claire Carter
- Alan Morrissey as Nicky van Barr (until episode 2)
- Barry Sloane as Kieran Callaghan (episodes 5−21)

== Reception ==
=== Critical response ===
The series' opening episode received positive reviews from critics. The Daily Mirror's Jane Simon commended Henry's debut, writing that he was "off to a head-start, carrying off the haughty, brisk arrogance of a top consultant." What's on TV selected the episode as the "Top TV" choice of the day, similarly commenting that "Henry has a ball playing Holby's new top dog, stealing all the best lines as he adds a wonderful slice of cutting humour to proceedings." The Liverpool Daily Post also selected the episode as recommended viewing for the day of broadcast. Another positive review of Hanssen came from Becky Jones of the Leicester Mercury, who deemed him "the best thing about the programme", with all of the best lines. Rebecca Jordan of OntheBox rated the episode 4/5. She enjoyed Henry's "sarcastic yet strangely affable" character, comparing him to Gregory House for his ability to diagnose patients "nearly as fast as he distributes withering one-liners." Jordan pinpointed Hanssen's appeal as being the "much-needed humour" he brought to the series, as well as the dynamic between Hanssen and Connie, writing that "the volatile rapport between him and Connie is thoroughly engaging and leaves little doubt in our minds that he will quickly become an exciting addition to the show." Jordan also enjoyed the "metaphorical genius" of depicting Faye with blood on her hands following her role in Linden's death. The following episode, "The Short Straw", was also selected as the "Top TV" choice of the day by What's on TV, who commented that "some of the script is a little heavy-handed, but Guy Henry as panto-esque axeman Henrik is particularly good fun".

=== Ratings ===
On 7 December 2010, Holby City was scheduled against the ITV soap operas Emmerdale and Coronation Street, which aired outside their usual timeslots. The episode, "Losing Game", declined by two million viewers on the previous week and attained a 14.6% share of the viewing audience, its lowest percentage since 2003.
