= Antoine Malick =

- Holby City character
- Jimmy Akingbola as Antoine Malick
- First appearance: "Running the Gauntlet"; 4 January 2011
- Last appearance: "I'll Walk You Home"; 7 June 2016
- Portrayed by: Jimmy Akingbola

In-universe information
- Alias: The Malick
- Occupation: Consultant General Surgeon
- Children: Jake Patterson (son) Unnamed child

Antoine Malick is a fictional character from the BBC medical drama Holby City. He is portrayed by Jimmy Akingbola, and has appeared since the series thirteen episode "Running the Gauntlet", first broadcast on 4 January 2011. A maverick registrar with a volatile temper, Malick was created to compensate for the departures of many regular characters during the thirteenth series. Akingbola had twice appeared in the programme in guest roles, and was invited to audition for Malick on the strength of his performances. Before joining Holby City, he had previously played a regular role in its short-lived police spin-off, HolbyBlue. Akingbola left the series in 2013, with Malick departing on 26 November 2013. He returned for the exit of Arthur Digby (Rob Ostlere) on 7 June 2016.

Holby City follows the professional and personal lives of medics at the fictional Holby City Hospital. Malick was introduced as a new member of the hospital's Acute Assessment Unit staff, after almost being fired for assaulting his boss. Conflict with his colleagues, anger management and a desire for career advancement formed a focal point of his early story-lines. The character gradually softened, and Akingbola portrays him as being fundamentally good-hearted. Malick is gay; he develops a rivalry with orthopaedic surgeon Dan Hamilton (Adam Astill), who later kisses him during a fight. His alpha male characterisation has attracted critical praise, while his pairing with Dan received a more mixed response, including viewer complaints about the kiss.

== Storylines ==
Malick is introduced on the verge of being fired from Holby City Hospital, after assaulting his boss on the Day Care Surgical ward. He explains to Director of Surgery Henrik Hanssen (Guy Henry) that it was necessary to save a patient: resuscitation had been abandoned, but after forcefully taking control of the situation, Malick was able to revive them. On the proviso that he attends anger management counselling, Hanssen gives Malick a final chance and attaches him to the Acute Assessment Unit (AAU). There, he soon clashes with the unit's staff: consultant Michael Spence (Hari Dhillon), Foundation doctor Penny Valentine (Emma Catherwood), and ward sister Frieda Petrenko (Olga Fedori). Relations begin to improve when Malick is left in charge of the unit for the day. Although he initially dismisses Penny's diagnoses and advice, ultimately he is forced to call on Michael for help and realises that she was right all along. He also becomes Frieda's mentor when she is accepted onto the Foundation programme. A racist patient makes a complaint about Malick; when her condition rapidly deteriorates in theatre, he walks out, causing the junior AAU staff to believe he has abandoned them. Malick soon returns with a crash team and saves the patient's life. Penny develops a crush on him, but Frieda informs her he is gay.

A domestic abuse case tests Malick's temper. Suspecting an injured husband of beating his wife, Malick switches his pain-relieving morphine for saline to increase his suffering. When Penny is killed in a train crash, her brother Oliver (James Anderson) confides in Malick that he is not a qualified doctor, as he switched his own exam paper with Penny's while they were at university. Malick dissuades Oliver from confessing to Hanssen, and agrees to keep his secret. Hanssen transfers Malick from the AAU to Keller, the hospital's general surgery ward. There, he attempts to ingratiate himself with consultant Ric Griffin (Hugh Quarshie), but discord arises between the two when Ric insinuates that Malick performed a hysterectomy on a drug-addicted mother out of spite rather than medical necessity. Malick also comes into conflict with orthopaedic surgeon Dan Hamilton (Adam Astill) over treatment of a patient, which intensifies when he discovers that Dan has been illegally providing an old friend with steroids. A physical altercation ensues, which results in Dan kissing Malick, before running off to be with his girlfriend, ward sister Chrissie Williams (Tina Hobley).

2013 proves to be a challenging year for Malick, both personally and professionally. He is forced to re-evaluate his situation and decides that he needs to take some time out.

In October 2013, Malick is severely injured following an accident also involving his colleagues, Chantelle, Arthur and Hanssen, Malick saves Chantelle from disaster but his right hand is severed beyond the wrist after a bale of hay falls on top of the car jamming his wrist in the process. Michael and Serena were able to re-attach the hand but while the operation appeared to be successful, there is uncertainty regarding Malick's future as a surgeon as only partial use of his hand is expected to return with physiotherapy.

== Development ==
=== Creation ===
Malick was one of several characters introduced during Holby City's thirteenth series, at a time when the programme was undergoing the loss of many established characters. He, along with director of surgery Henrik Hanssen and cardiothoracic surgeon Sahira Shah (Laila Rouass), was created to compensate for the departures. Series producer Myar Craig-Brown hoped the new group would become "equally iconic" as their predecessors.

Prior to being cast as Malick, Akingbola had multiple roles in Holby–branded programmes. He played main character Constable Neil Parker in Holby City's police-procedural spin-off HolbyBlue, and twice appeared in Holby City itself in guest roles. During series twelve, the actor had a two-episode arc as injured boxer Tommy King. His performance so impressed the producers that they agreed to bring him back as a main character. Contacted about the possibility of a permanent role whilst filming his guest-spot in March 2010, Akingbola was initially sceptical of his chances, as he would be recognisable to viewers. Around five months later, he was invited to audition for Malick.

The audition process proved difficult, as some of Akingbola's close friends were also considered for the part. He was dually motivated by the prospect of financial security, and the role itself. Enthused by the character outline, he tailored his performance to the detailed breakdown he was given, and attended his audition dressed in the style he believed Malick would wear. Akingbola recalls, "They were very open with me, encouraging me to push it further and make him more aggressive." The producers were flexible when it came to his interpretation of the character, and Akingbola believes it was his intense portrayal which secured him the role. He explained: "They were looking for someone to put the flesh on the character, and that's what I did. I even wondered whether I was pushing it too much, as people might have wondered how such an extreme person could be a doctor. But I think that's what got me the part in the end – they were looking for a character who would be in people's faces, be a bit dangerous and speak his mind!" Following his successful audition, Akingbola began filming in September 2010. It took several months for him to become accustomed to the job security; initially he took extra roles before arriving to film Holby City. His first episode as Malick aired in January 2011.

=== Characterisation ===
Chippy and ambitious, Antoine Malick or "The Malick" as he calls himself, doesn't suffer fools gladly. He's proud of who he is and passionate about what he believes in. A hard grafter, he's ready to take the role of Consultant. But his strong opinions and instinctive moral compass often get the better of him, landing him in more trouble than he feels he deserves.

— BBC Online.

Malick's forthcoming arrival was announced by the BBC on 26 November 2010. Described as "a complex character who completely divides opinion amongst his Holby colleagues", executive producer Belinda Campbell expanded: "He absolutely refuses to play the political game and his bedside manner leaves a lot to be desired. However, there is no doubt he excels at his job and what would overwhelm other medics is like nectar to Malick." Akingbola deemed his character "an alpha male who doesn't suffer fools gladly", someone who would cause ructions amongst staff and patients alike. Despite his abrasive personality, Malick is a talented doctor. Akingbola likened him to footballer Eric Cantona, in that he is "highly skilled, but his temper, his attitude and his confidence get in the way." As a result of his refusal to engage in hospital politics, he is introduced as a registrar who has not achieved his "main ambition" of being promoted to consultant level, although he is close to it, and feels he should be one already. Confident in his ability, Malick exudes arrogance. The actor suggested that Malick's drive stemmed from having been told he would never amount to anything, and a desire to prove his detractors wrong.

"He's such a beautiful, complex person – sometimes you love him, sometimes you hate him. He's a breath of fresh air and I think it's good Holby's got a young, dynamic black doctor that's ready to take on his colleagues. He's just like, 'Why not? Obama's President, why can't I run Holby City?" [...] He's a maverick who believes in himself. But he's also a teddy bear, a nice guy. Yes, he's a bit short-tempered but it all comes from the heart. He feels people at Holby put their heads in the sand. He's going to tell it like it is."

— Akingbola on Malick's characterisation.

"Dark layers", and a nuanced personality of "many different levels and shades" attracted Akingbola to the role. Malick has a violent streak, and is introduced after hitting his former boss, though he becomes calmer with time. A February 2011 episode saw his composure threatened by a racist patient. Akingbola appreciated the storyline for highlighting the continuation of racism and prejudice: "In this country, we can feel like there's no racism and it's like a lovely Benetton advert but it's still there – that's the truth." He characterised Malick as "not all bad", capable of becoming "a nice guy", and expanded: "I think the thing with Malick is that he's young, confident and he speaks from the heart. He wears his heart on his sleeve, and I don't think there's many people like that on the ward! He doesn't care if what he says offends people, because that's what he believes. But he becomes a bit more sensitive." Akingbola anticipated many "twists and turns" in Malick's storylines. He described him as having many secrets, and being a closed off person who "keeps his cards very close to his chest." Using the simile of an onion, he asserted that Malick's layers would be peeled back slowly, to reveal his "wonderful heart".

The character's temperament and masculinity have been a focal point of critical commentary. Teddy Jamieson of The Herald observed, "He's big, he's black and he's all man", and predicted that Malick's tenure would be "testosterone-tastic." A Sunday Mercury review deemed him "a force to be reckoned with", and What's on TV described him as a "misunderstood macho man" with "a dark, volatile side". Anthony D. Langford of gay media website AfterElton.com characterised Malick as an arrogant and egotistical "bad boy", who nevertheless is an excellent physician. Praised for his "veritable mix of attitude, arrogance and cheekiness", Malick was lauded as "a man who refused to shy away from the truth, delivering razor-sharp one-liners as well as any stand-up comic" by the Liverpool Echo's Susan Griffin. Malick often uses illeism, referring to himself in the third person as "The Malick". In an examination of his dialogue in his introductory episode, the Daily Mirror's Jane Simon likened him to a candidate on the reality television series The Apprentice, citing his claims, "When you come to Malick you get 150% every time," and "You do not want to lose The Malick!"

=== Relationships ===
Although Malick has an antagonistic relationship with many of his colleagues, soon after his introduction he developed a friendship with ward sister Chrissie Williams. Akingbola assessed, "Chrissie likes him – they become quite friendly and he never seems to have any problems with her at all. I think they're quite close friends." His early storylines focussed on his professional, rather than love life. In his third episode, Penny developed a crush on him, and was disappointed to learn from Frieda that Malick is gay. Though viewers approached Akingbola to ask if he and Frieda would become an item, Malick's sexuality was later confirmed when he described himself as a "big poof". The actor commented that, "rather than make him a stereotype, Holby is pushing the boundaries as the story progresses."

A rivalry developed between Malick and consultant Dan Hamilton, which AfterElton.com's Langford felt intensified once Dan learned of Malick's sexual orientation. The BBC intended to lead subtly into a storyline between the two, with Malick's sexuality "wrong-foot[ing]" Dan, and a "love/hate relationship" developing between them. Concurrent to their conflict, Dan was in a burgeoning relationship with Chrissie. Matters came to a head between them when Malick discovered that Dan had been negligent in treating a friend. A physical altercation ensued, and culminated with Dan kissing Malick. Akingbola said that "Malick sees a side to Dan that completely throws him. It's a real shock." Langford wrote about "the self-satisfied smug look on Malick's face" once Dan left, and interpreted that "he knew that eventually it would come to that and he enjoyed finally pushing Dan until he broke". Following complaints about the storyline, the BBC assured viewers that it would be told "with sensitivity and integrity" as Dan struggled to accept his orientation.

== Reception ==
Akingbola has received a positive response from Holby City viewers regarding his character. In May 2011, he commented: "A lot of people have never seen a character like Malick on TV before. People of my parents' age tell me they're loving Malick – the older Nigerian guys love how he bosses people around! I’ve also had younger viewers tell me that they're glad they have a character they can relate to." Critical response has also been generally positive. Malick's introductory episode was selected as recommended viewing by the Sunday Mercury. Inside Soap's Katy Moon described him as having made a "big impact from day one", with the observation: "His arrogance, combined with his boundless determination to do the right thing by his patients, means that no one could have missed his arrival on the wards – be it the medics in the show or Holby viewers." Simon of the Daily Mirror quipped that Malick was "just what the doctor ordered" to counterbalance the programme's weaker males. She positively contrasted Malick—alongside Hanssen and Michael—with former "spineless male doctors". Simon later deemed Malick "lovely", and found it interesting that he was gay.

Prior to Malick's first kiss with Dan, Moon stated that there was "one hell of a shock" coming up, which was "certainly worth waiting for". Later, she wrote that their showdown had "astonishing repercussions". Simon similarly wrote that there was "a rather massive surprise in store and even if you've seen it coming a mile off, it's got OMG stamped all over it." In reference to Malick's clash with Dan, she opined, "You can practically hear their antlers locking, as the tension between them is unbearable." Though What's on TV recommended the episode, the accompanying review criticised the "seriously irritating banter between the pair," and ensuing "macho posturing between the orthopaedic surgeon and mouthy Malick." Simon's Mirror colleague Jim Shelley described the kiss as "Not exactly Oliver Reed & Alan Bates".

The BBC discussion programme Points of View received some complaints about the kiss, from viewers dismayed that Holby City was "following the trend" of depicting gay relationships. Frances Ryan of The Guardian responded, "Whether said complainers thought that the on-screen depiction of straight people or indeed the interaction of humans generally was similarly a compliance to fantastical trends remains unseen". The BBC did not reveal the number of complaints made, but released a statement explaining that, "Holby City aims to reflect real life in the setting of a medical drama and this means telling stories about characters from many different backgrounds, faiths, religions and sexualities. We approach our portrayal of same-sex relationships in the same way as we do heterosexual relationships and aim to ensure depictions of affection or sexuality between couples are suitable for pre-watershed viewing."

Langford of AfterElton.com was conflicted by the storyline's beginning. He deemed himself a fan of the "compelling" Malick, and approved of him for providing black representation. Langford opined that Akingbola and Astill had chemistry, that the characters' scenes were "intense and combustible," and that the fight and following kiss were "terrifically done, full of passion and heat and rage". However, he expressed concern that the same type of storyline had been attempted in soap operas on multiple occasions. Langford concluded: "If the usual template is followed from here there will be weeks of denials and more fighting. I suspect that Malick and Dan will eventually embark on a secret affair, Chrissie will find out, there will be more denials and fighting and at some point Dan will accept who he is. Still, despite the tired storyline, the characters are complex and appealing and the writing is solid enough to make me overlook that." A writer from TV Buzz said that "Malick has already got an ego the size of the UK, but with his new role as Clinical Skills tutor and one of his pupils treating him like a hero, it's about to go global."
