= Sahira Shah =

- Holby City character
- Laila Rouass as Sahira Shah
- First appearance: "Blue Valentine"; 15 February 2011
- Last appearance: Episode 1057; 4 May 2021
- Created by: Belinda Campbell
- Portrayed by: Laila Rouass

In-universe information
- Occupation: Clinical lead, Darwin; Consultant cardiothoracic surgeon; (prev. Cardiothoracic surgical registrar)
- Family: Reyan Shah (father)
- Spouse: Rafi Raza (divorced)
- Significant other: Greg Douglas
- Children: Abs Raza; Indy Raza

Sahira Shah is a fictional character from the BBC medical drama Holby City, played by actress Laila Rouass. She makes her first appearance in the series thirteen episode "Blue Valentine", first broadcast on 15 February 2011. The character was one of multiple characters introduced following a spate of cast exits. Sahira is employed at Holby City Hospital as a Cardiothoracic surgical registrar. She is an old acquaintance of Henrik Hanssen (Guy Henry) who is the CEO and Director of Surgery at the hospital. She has been portrayed as an honest character with a "warm heart". She approaches her career with perfectionist tendencies which is compromised by her emotional vulnerability.

The character's main relationships were with Hanssen, a friendship with registrar Greg Douglas (Edward MacLiam) and a feud with consultant cardiothoracic surgeon Jac Naylor (Rosie Marcel). Rouass later decided to leave the show and Sahira departs in the series fourteen episode "Ribbons", first broadcast on 17 April 2012. The actress reprised the role in 2021 for a two-month guest stint. Writers incorporated Sahira into a story exploring historic abuse after it is revealed that her father, Reyhan Shah (Raad Rawi), abused Hanssen as a teenager. The character has been well received by television critics; two TVTimes reporters both expressed their disappointment at her departure.

== Storylines ==
Sahira arrives at Holby City Hospital as a registrar on the cardiothoracic surgery ward, Darwin. Having taken time out from her career to have two children, she is assigned a mentor – a reluctant Jac Naylor (Rosie Marcel), who sees her as a potential rival. It emerges that Sahira took the job at the behest of Director of Surgery Henrik Hanssen (Guy Henry), who she worked under at three previous hospitals. Tasked with managing budget cuts, Hanssen is looking to make staff redundancies, and asks Sahira to report to him on the capability of registrar Greg Douglas (Edward MacLiam). Although Greg struggles in an operation, Sahira claims that he is an excellent surgeon. She tells Hanssen that she will not be his spy, and does not want special favours from him in return. Hanssen therefore reneges on his promise to allow Sahira to work flexitime. With a consultant position available, Sahira decides to apply, which pits her against Jac. Greg feels that Sahira is taking liberties by arranging her childcare schedule on duty and delegating patient care to him. He suggests that she is incapable of balancing her personal and professional life, but feels guilty when Sahira subsequently struggles in an operation and is berated by Hanssen. On the day of the consultant interviews, Sahira becomes emotionally involved in a patient's plight and misses her interview slot, so Jac is awarded the position by default. Greg later oversteps Sahira to take the lead on the case of a teenage girl with a rare heart condition. He is devastated when she dies in theatre, and breaks Hanssen's windscreen in a drunken accident. Hanssen issues Greg with a formal warning; Sahira sympathises with him, and when he later makes a medical error, she takes the blame and resultant warning herself.

Dismayed that Sahira would tarnish her previously unblemished record for Greg, Hanssen attempts to revive their previously positive working relationship. He offers to remove the warning from her file, and convinces her to join him in an operation she has never performed before, but is forced to call Greg in to assist when she panics in theatre. The operation is ultimately successful, but an angered Sahira tells Hanssen she is unwilling to be his "special project" any longer. As a result of the hospital's financial difficulties, the cardiothoracic department faces closure. Sahira comes up with an idea for a mobile cardiac unit, which Jac gives her consultant backing to, but double-crosses her by signing a contract with plastic surgeon Michael Spence (Hari Dhillon), whose department is encroaching on Darwin. Worried about her future at Holby, Sahira tells Hanssen that she has been offered a job in a Newcastle hospital. When an official visit goes badly, Hanssen is forced to announce the demise of the cardiothoracic department. Sahira is furious, and goes against Hanssen's instructions by taking on an emergency patient, who she unsuccessfully attempts to conceal in the basement. Aware that he could lose her to Newcastle, Hanssen tells Sahira that although her trauma unit proposal is not in the best interests of the hospital or himself, he cannot let her go.

== Development ==
=== Creation and characterisation ===
Sweet as cupcakes but with a rod of steel running through her, this twenty first century woman strives for nothing less than perfection in every facet of her life- Sahira is a loyal wife, a loving mother and a brilliant surgeon with a rare gift for surgery. Yet underneath the surface she is paddling furiously to keep her head above water. Kind, honest and classy, the working mum has come to Holby as the protogy [sic] of Hanssen. But conscious of relying on his favour, ambitious Sahira wants to forge her independence and carve a career on her own merit.

— BBC Online.

Sahira was one of several characters introduced during Holby City's thirteenth series, at a time when many established characters were written out. She, along with Hanssen and registrar Antoine Malick (Jimmy Akingbola), were created to compensate for the losses. Series producer Myar Craig-Brown said she wanted the new group to become "equally iconic" as their predecessors. Sahira was created as an old acquaintance of Hanssen's, and their relationship formed a central focus of the series. She was additionally devised as a love interest for registrar Greg Douglas, and rival to colleague Jac Naylor.

BBC Online described Sahira's qualities as being her passionate nature, her warm-heart and her honesty. They said she is flawed by her emotional vulnerability and being a perfectionist. She has the tendency to become emotionally attached to certain patients, which Rouass felt stemmed from her being a working mother. Her situation necessitates balancing her personal and professional lives, and she is depicted as sometimes failing to commit fully to both. Rouass and executive producer Belinda Campbell hoped that viewers would be able to identify with Sahira: the former deemed her situation "a reflection on what millions of women are going through now", and the latter said that she had been "a joy to create". Campbell added that while Sahira appeared "cool and calm", in reality she was "kicking madly just to keep afloat" and had created a "façade of perfection" around herself. The show never mentions Sahira's ethnicity, which Rouass - who is of Moroccan and Indian descent - liked. She admitted that she even did not know what her character's ethnicity was.

Generally well-liked by her colleagues, Rouass said that despite Sahira's rivalry with Jac, she was unlikely to become embroiled in professional discord. She expanded that Sahira is not territorial and prefers to "kill people with kindness rather than being in your face or sly." She is good at her job, and Rouass assessed that although Sahira is very ambitious, unlike Jac she is not "bitchy about it". Instead, "her ambition is a silent one and people generally love [and are fascinated] by her".

=== Casting ===
In November 2010, it was announced that Rouass had been cast as Sahira. After she completed filming on the ITV programme Primeval, Rouass told her agent that the only show she would sign a long-term contract with was Holby City, as she believed it to be "so understated in the most positive sense." It was important to Rouass that she loved her character before signing, and explained that if she could not connect with Sahira and was not passionate about creating her, then she feared the role would become just another job. Rouass ultimately joined the show on a one-year contract, the longest she had ever signed. Sahira was created as a woman struggling to balance her career with being a mother, something Rouass was able to relate to as a working mother herself.

Rouass, who had no medical expertise prior to her casting, said the role was "a real eye opener." She spent a day at The Heart Hospital in London as preparation, and commented in February 2011 that she also hoped to observe a real operation. Rouass felt it was crucial that she liked her character and remained passionate about creating her, otherwise she may not have taken the role on. When asked whether she had much input into the character or storylines, Rouass explained that she had been given a questionnaire to gauge her opinion of Sahira's backstory, and that the creative team were receptive to suggestions.

In November 2011, Rouass announced her intention to leave Holby City, in order to spend more time with her daughter. On 8 November, she stated that she would be filming for several more weeks, and that Sahira would remain on-screen until early spring 2012. She did not believe her character would be killed off.

=== Relationships ===
"They're both very competitive and focused and both want the same outcome but they do it in different ways and have different approaches to their job. I think they've got a lot of respect for one another as both are very good at what they do, they're exceptional, but you've also got the catty comments, which gives it a fun element, so it's never too serious."

— Rouass, on Sahira and Jac's relationship.

Sahira was introduced as a rival for registrar Jac Naylor. Rouass characterised their relationship as a tense one, alleviated by frequent comedic one liners. She called the rivalry a highlight of Sahira's early storylines, noting that the "bitchy, catty comments [gave] it a fun element." Rouass explained that although Jac was threatened by Sahira's presence, a mutual – albeit silent – respect developed as a result of their shared profession. Though Jac had had antagonistic relationships with many of her colleagues beforehand, Katy Moon of Inside Soap assessed that she may have "met her match" in Sahira when the two competed for a cardiothoracic consultancy. Marcel, who plays Jac, observed that her character's previous competitors had all been male, in contrast to Sahira. She noted that Jac suspected nepotism on Hanssen's part had been responsible for Sahira's hiring, and commented that her character would not allow "someone like that" to best her. However, when one of Jac's patients later died in theatre, she was surprised that Sahira stood by her; Marcel called Sahira's loyalty "quite a moment" for Jac. When the future of the cardiothoracic ward was threatened, Jac secretly backed opposing plans by Sahira and Michael. Marcel explained that Jac had her own self-interest at heart: "She's on the side she's always been on, which is hers." She refrained from giving advice on a difficult case, "hoping Sahira [would] hang herself," however to the surprise of Jac and their colleagues, Sahira performed well and impressed Director of Surgery Henrik Hanssen.

In October 2010, prior to Sahira's arrival, Guy Henry revealed that his character Hanssen would be mentoring a female doctor and their partnership would carry a "hint of unrequited love." It was later revealed that Sahira's backstory included a friendship with Hanssen. She was said to have a "dark history" with him. Whilst producer Craig-Brown revealed that they had storylines together planned for the whole of series thirteen. By January 2011, Henry confirmed the unrequited love scenario would be applied to Hanssen and Sahira. Rouass said their history was not romantic, just mentorship. Hanssen pushes Sahira as he believed her personal life prevented her from reaching her full potential. She agreed that Hanssen is a "big fan" of Sahira's work. Henry later revealed Hanssen was attracted to her but saw her more as this "wonderful doctor and a bloody good surgeon." The theme of unrequited love remained set in place, as he did not want "distract her" from her work.

Sahira is married with two children. Rouass revealed that her family may be introduced to the series in 2011, and indeed her youngest son Indy appeared in the episode "What You Mean By Home". In her introductory episode, Sahira stated that she had two sons, however in the later episode "Hand In Glove", she mentioned having both a son and a daughter. Despite the fact her character is married, Rouass expressed her desire for Sahira to have a romantic relationship with an on-screen character. She hoped that Sahira would become involved in a love triangle as she found many of the male cast members "really dishy", and noted that being married has "never stopped anyone." She assessed that Sahira has "plenty of chemistry" with her colleague Greg Douglas, which she was looking forward to depicting. In June 2011, Craig-Brown stated that a central focus of series thirteen had been establishing Sahira's character and developing a triangle between herself, Greg and Hanssen. Asked about Sahira's future storylines, Craig-Brown commented, "there's been an amazing relationship developing between her and Greg, and it's going to be exacerbated by a blast from Greg's past". She said that this would bring the two closer together, but qualified, "I don't want it to be a conventional soap or serial drama story about a woman who has an affair, because I think it's not as simple as that. We're trying to mine the difficulties that people face if they fall in love with somebody else."

=== Return ===
Sahira was reintroduced to the show in the twenty-second series, following Jac's departure from the serial. Rouass confirmed the news on her Instagram account in January 2021 by sharing an image of her and Henry on-set. She teased that Sahira would start "ruffling feathers". Sahira returns in the show's 1045th episode, broadcast on 10 February 2021, when she is hired as the new clinical lead of Darwin, the hospital's cardiothoracic ward. Sophie Dainty from Digital Spy reported that Sahira's return would explore her and Hanssen's "ambiguous relationship" again and there would be "a few surprises in store". The COVID-19 pandemic impacted the filming of Holby City and actors were required to stay two metres apart at all time. To get around this, actor's real-life partners were sometimes hired as body doubles for other characters. Rouass's partner, Ronnie O'Sullivan, volunteered himself for this but was rejected by producers for being "too hairy". Rouass explained that they could not match his body, so he was not invited onto set.

Upon her return, Sahira is single, having separated from her husband. It emerges that Sahira had an affair, sparking the end of their marriage. Zubin Varla was reintroduced as her husband Rafi Raza for one episode, and Ali Hadji-Heshmati was cast in a recurring role as their eldest son, Abs Raza. Writers integrated Sahira into the unit of characters featured on Darwin ward, including consultant Kian Madani (Ramin Karimloo), registrar Chloe Godard (Amy Lennox) and junior doctor Nicky McKendrick (Belinda Owusu). Kian is on admin duties and tries to "sweet talk" Sahira into letting him back on clinical duties, but she rejects him. She then meets an elderly couple with one of them due an operation. Sahira is "touched by their love and warmth" and becomes determined to save them in theatre. She is "heartbroken" when they die in the operation.

=== Reyhan Shah ===
Holby City developed an issue-based storyline focusing on historical sexual abuse following Sahira's return. It is revealed that Sahira's father, Reyhan Shah (Raad Rawi), had sexually abused Hanssen while teaching him at boarding school. The story had been previously teased when Sahira was introduced. Henry explained that it was an "important topic" to cover and he was pleased to be entrusted with it. The story begins when Reyhan is admitted onto the wards in need of a transplant. Hanssen avoids treating him, but Sahira realises this and accuses him of not providing "his usual top-class treatment". Hanssen operates on Reyhan but is left "visibly distressed" after they have a conversation. Sahira is not a match for her father's transplant, leaving her "crushed". She becomes aware that Reyhan may not survive the wait for a transplant and considers tampering with his records to speed up the process. Hanssen realises her plans and tries to talk her out of it. Instead, Hanssen adjusts the records himself and performs the transplant. As he prepares to operate, Sahira confides in Hanssen that Reyhan's former pupils have made an allegation of abuse against him, leaving Hanssen "shaken". He struggles in theatre and makes a mistake, placing Reyhan into a coma.

Writers pushed the story forwards when Hanssen admits to Sahira that he was abused by Reyhan. The development begins after Sahira bribes the mother of the pupil Reyhan abused into withdrawing the allegation. She is then glad when Abs visits her and Reyhan at hospital, but Hanssen is "horrified" when he suspects something wrong with Reyhan and Abs. He intervenes and confesses that he was abused by Reyhan as a teenager. Reyhan warns Hanssen that Sahira will not believe him. Henry told Victoria Wilson of What to Watch that Reyhan demonstrates himself to be "a devious, manipulative, nasty piece of work". Sahira refuses to believe Hanssen. Henry commented, "Deep in Sahira's heart and soul, she understands it's the truth but can't allow herself to believe it". Hanssen suggests that Sahira asks Abs about his relationship with Reyhan, angering Sahira who slaps Hanssen. As Hanssen reports his abuse to the police, Sahira decides to leave the hospital. Digital Spy's Sophie Dainty confirmed that the character had not left and would feature in further episodes.

Sahira returns following Reyhan's readmission onto the wards, and brings Abs with her. She struggles to diagnose her father and asks Hanssen for his opinion but when he suggests that Reyhan is self-harming to avoid trial, Sahira rejects the idea. While visiting, Abs challenges Reyhan on the allegations and it emerges that he is also abusing Abs. Reyhan then "shows his true colours" by threatening Abs, who confides in Sahira that he is being abused by his grandfather. The character of Reyhan is then killed-off as writers created a "whodunit" twist about if he was murdered. Sahira, Hanssen and Abs were named as the main suspects. The twist builds towards Rouass' departure from the show at the conclusion of her two-month guest stint. As an investigation into Reyhan's death begins, Sahira and Hanssen's friendship is tested. However, Sahira is shocked when Abs confesses to killing his grandfather. She decides to protect Abs and falsely informs Hanssen and the police that she killed Reyhan, devastating both Hanssen and Abs. This served as the character's exit from the series. She made her final appearance in the show's 1057th episode, broadcast on 4 May 2021.

== Reception ==
Rouass was nominated in the Drama Performance: Female category at the 2011 National Television Awards for her performance as Sahira. "Blue Valentine", the episode in which Sahira was introduced, was selected as recommended viewing by the Liverpool Daily Post and Sunday Mercury. Both publications commented on the way she immediately made her presence felt through her interactions with Greg and sparring with Jac. The former additionally called her "very attractive and talented" and observed that she outshone Jac. The episode drew 5.59 million viewers, down from 6.13 million for the previous episode, however Andrew Laughlin of media news website Digital Spy attributed a rise of 310,000 viewers the following week to the storyline which saw Sahira struggle with her loyalty to Hanssen.

TV presenter Alan Titchmarsh described Sahira as "an amazing character" because she is "head vs heart". He also said "this is a woman who is a surgeon, but whose emotions are very much to the full." The Daily Mirror's Jane Simon approved of the Sahira/Jac double-act, and commented, "Watching Sahira (sweet, maternal, human) and Jac (a Dalek in scrubs) hilariously lobbing insults at each other is to witness the start of a beautiful hatred and the scriptwriters are guaranteed to have a lot of fun writing for these two." Once the two began working together on Sahira's Cardiac Trauma Unit, the TVTimes commented, "Whisper it, but Sahira and Jac make a great team, with Jac's tough love proving to be what her nemesis needs." In July 2011, What's on TV described Sahira as one of their favourite characters, but called "Sirens", the episode in which she misses her son's birthday, "Not one of the great episodes, if we're honest, as Sahira's attempts to juggle home life and career [...] feel overly contrived."

In April 2012, the editor of TVTimes, Ian Abbott said that he would miss "smart surgeon Sahira". While columnist Joanne Lowles named Sahira's final episode as a four star rated "TV Highlight" that was "memorable for all the wrong reasons". She added that it "was a shame" to see Sahira depart because Rouass had played her "brilliantly"; describing her exit scenes as a "disastrous final surgery and a predictable huge bust-up with Hanssen". Sue Haasler, a critic at the Metro, praised the historic abuse plot and called Reyhan's death "another shock twist in what has been a harrowing and emotional story". She also said the story features "powerful and hard-hitting scenes". Shaun Linden from ATV Today included Sahira's final episode in his "pick of the plots" for that week.
