= Henrik Hanssen =

- Holby City character
- Guy Henry as Henrik Hanssen
- First appearance: "Shifts"; 19 October 2010
- Last appearance: "Episode 1102"; 29 March 2022
- Portrayed by: Guy Henry
- Spinoff(s): Casualty (2011, 2015, 2016, 2019)

In-universe information
- Alias: Henrik Hanssen MBBS BSc MD FRCS
- Occupation: Consultant General Surgeon; Chief Executive Officer; Director of Surgery
- Family: Anders Lövborg (father); Elizabet Hanssen (mother)
- Children: Fredrik Johansson (son)
- Relatives: Oskar Johansson (grandson)
- Nationality: Swedish

Henrik Hanssen is a fictional character from the BBC medical drama Holby City, played by actor Guy Henry. He made his first appearance in the thirteenth series episode "Shifts", broadcast on 19 October 2010. Hanssen is initially a consultant general surgeon and the joint Director of Surgery of Holby City Hospital. He later becomes the sole Director of Surgery and the chief executive officer of the hospital trust. Henry has also appeared in Holby City's sister show, Casualty, as Hanssen on multiple occasions.

On 25 August 2013, Henry announced he had left Holby City after three years in the role and his on-screen departure aired on 8 October 2013. A year later, it was announced that Henry had chosen to return to his role and Hanssen's return scenes aired on 28 April 2015. Following his return, he has made several guest appearances in Casualty. Henry made a temporary departure in October 2016 and after a guest appearance on 3 January 2017, he returned on 7 February 2017. He made another temporary departure on 13 August 2019, and returned on 18 February 2020, staying until the show's conclusion in 2022.

== Storylines ==
=== Holby City ===
Hanssen is introduced as the new joint Director of Surgery at Holby Hospital, working alongside Connie Beauchamp (Amanda Mealing). In a meeting with the hospital board, he criticises Connie's plan to purchase a new MRI scanner for the cardiothoracic ward as being self-serving and naïve. He later informs the staff that budget cuts and redundancies will have to be made for the good of the hospital in a fraught economic climate. Hanssen considers making general surgeon Ric Griffin (Hugh Quarshie) redundant as he is unable to perform clinical duties while undergoing chemotherapy. Connie defends Ric's position, and Hanssen allows her to make the final decision on redundancies, resulting in the dismissal of six nurses. Hanssen later grants Ric leave of absence to concentrate on his health. Before departing, Ric requests that Hanssen direct his budget cuts away from the general surgery department.

After Connie's resignation from Holby City at the start of 2011, Hanssen becomes the sole Director of Surgery. He also assumes the position of CEO following the resignation of Mark Williams in January 2011, merging this role with his Director of Surgery duties. In March 2011, after attempting to move all Upper-GI surgical cases from Keller ward to St James' Hospital, undermining Ric in the process and causing Ric to form a mutiny with fellow members of staff, Hanssen offers to operate on Ric in a risky bid to remove his terminal cancer.

Henrik's friendship with Sahira Shah (Laila Rouass), whom he hires to Darwin Ward in early 2011, is frowned upon by many of his colleagues, who believe that he is favouring her. Sahira is able to make Hanssen see the error of his ways several times and seems to calm him. Her relationship with Greg Douglas (Edward MacLiam), another Darwin surgeon, leads to conflict between the pair, and the belief that Hanssen has feelings for Sahira. When the affair between Sahira and Greg comes out, Sahira leaves the hospital, and it is revealed Hanssen feels like Sahira is a daughter to him and is distraught by her departure.

Serena Campbell (Catherine Russell) is hired as a new consultant on Keller Ward, and Hanssen finds himself trapped between her and Ric for several episodes. Later on Hanssen agrees with Serena's non-referral scheme and decides to pilot it. When Hanssen's decision costs a patient his life, the patient's unstable son takes Hanssen hostage; however, the scenario makes Hanssen realise that the NHS' current system is wrong and he campaigns against it. In the following weeks, the pressure from the board and the doubt cast by his colleagues causes Hanssen to depart Holby suddenly and without notice; Serena, and then Imelda Cousins (Tessa Peake-Jones), take up the position of temporary Director of Surgery.

Following Serena's bidding, Jac Naylor (Rosie Marcel) tracks Hanssen to Sweden. It is revealed that Hanssen disowned his father Anders Lövborg many years ago, due to Anders using data collected by the Nazis in his scientific research, which Hanssen believes was what led to his Jewish mother Elizabet's suicide. Hanssen then finds out that Elizabet wanted Anders to use the data so that her brother's death in the Holocaust wouldn't be pointless, and that the true reason she committed suicide was because she thought Anders was dead after his disappearance and she couldn't live without him. Now knowing the truth, Hanssen forgives his father and reunites with Anders on his deathbed. Hanssen agrees to return to Holby, to Serena's anguish, and quiets the board by making Serena his deputy.

Hanssen becomes close to F1 Tara Lo (Jing Lusi). When he discovers that she is practising with a brain tumour, he warns her that, if any growth occurs in the tumour, she will have to stop practising with immediate effect; Tara later begins to notice signs of growth but keeps it a secret. Hanssen organises CT scans to which she refuses to go to but later her boyfriend Oliver Valentine (James Anderson) finds a recent CT she had and informs Hanssen who tries to pull her out of theatre. Later he shows her the scan which confirms a 20% growth and with the support of Hanssen, Tara agrees to surgery to remove a large amount of the tumour but following complications in theatre she is pronounced brain-stem dead leaving Hanssen deeply upset.

Hanssen mellows as he returns to the more hands on side of medicine, spending more time treating patients on the wards and developing his working relationships with colleagues. Hanssen departs Holby General quietly after turning over the role of CEO to Serena. Hanssen returns to Sweden where he reconciles with Maja Johansson (Pia Halvorsen), his former partner, and finally meets his son, Fredrik, and his newborn grandson.

Over twenty months later, Hanssen's successor Guy Self (John Michie) steps down from the position and orchestrates a plan to bring in a new CEO who will persuade the board to fund his vision of a new neurology centre. Realising that Guy is manipulating both her and the board for his own ends, Serena takes action and makes a call to Hanssen who ultimately decides to return to Holby and takes the vacant CEO position. A rivalry develops between Hanssen and Guy, while he also shows his disdain towards Dominic Copeland (David Ames). Hanssen agrees to dress up as Santa so the children at the hospital are not let down after the hired Santa does not show up.

Hanssen's son Fredrik arrives at the hospital and clashes with his father. After weeks of arguing, Fredrik leaves but later returns with a gun, killing Raf di Lucca and severely wounding Oliver Valentine and Jac Naylor. Hanssen, along with the police, confronts Fredrik, who is then shot and dies.

After Raf's memorial, Hanssen's mental health deteriorates and he takes a break from the hospital, calling on Serena who returns to Holby and takes charge in his absence. Roxanna MacMillan tells Hanssen that he should not be torturing himself, but he still takes responsibility for Fredrik's actions. Weeks later, Hanssen returns to the hospital and resumes his role as CEO. He visits Ollie, who asks where he has been. Hanssen gets angry at the idea of Ollie trying to retrain and return to work, and tells him that his brain has been damaged. Hanssen goes into theatre to perform an operation with Meena Chowdhury, Sacha Levy and Dom, while Ollie is taunting him. After surgery, Hanssen shouts at Ollie again. Meanwhile Fletch is refusing to write the proposal for Hanssen. Hanssen and Fletch argue. Hanssen pins him up against the wall all while Ollie is watching. Hanssen bursts into tears and Ollie recollects Jac saying that he should stay and become a Consultant and how he took the bullet. Hanssen goes out on to the main ward and starts crying again and Ollie comforts him. Hanssen goes back to theatre, telling Sacha that he cannot be CEO anymore.

Hanssen continues to work at Holby as a consultant surgeon and is replaced as CEO by Abigail Tate, an old friend of Serena's. During this time suspicions are aroused over the ethics of his old friend John Gaskell and his subsequent medical trials. When the truth about Gaskell was exposed Abigail abruptly left and Hanssen assumed the role of CEO once more, but in the fallout of Roxanna's murder and John's death, he began to question whether he was suitable to lead Holby anymore.

=== Casualty ===
In February 2011, Hanssen visits the Emergency Department downstairs (as seen in Casualty), in order to observe the work there. He clashes with Lead Consultant Nick Jordan (Michael French), prompting Hanssen to instate a new Joint Clinical Lead, in the form of Miriam Turner (Cheryl Campbell), Jordan's old mentor. Off-screen, Hanssen promotes Zoe Hanna (Sunetra Sarker) to the emergency department's clinical lead. When he returns to Holby, Hanssen briefly takes charge of the ED while Zoe and Connie are absent. Robyn Miller (Amanda Henderson) and Ethan Hardy (George Rainsford) dislike his presence, especially when he appears suspiciously. Hanssen later sits in on the interviews for a new Band 6 Staff Nurse position in the ED, which Ben "Lofty" Chiltern (Lee Mead) eventually wins, and is present when Lofty is questioned over the accidental death of an agency nurse.

== Development ==
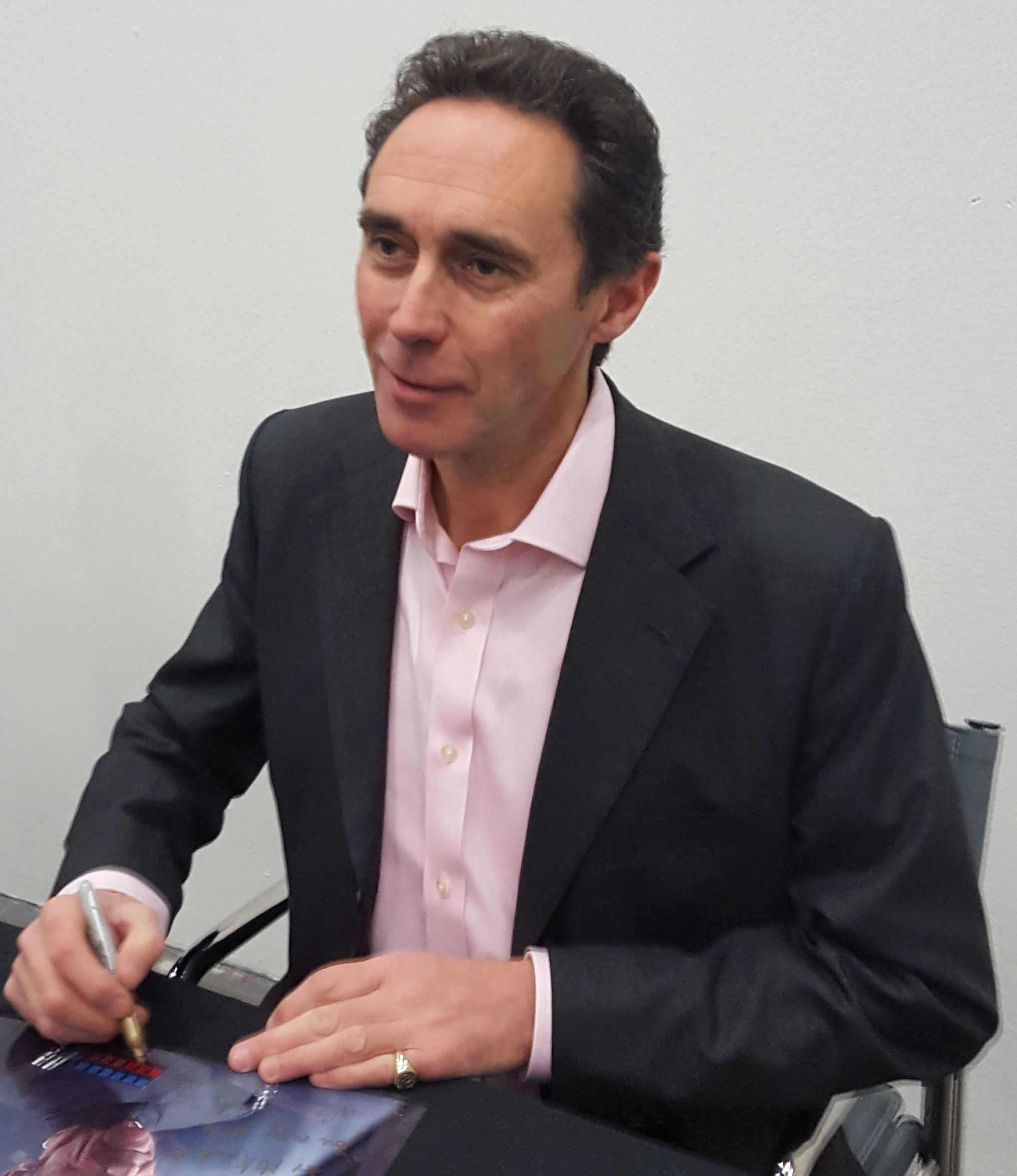
The character is portrayed by Guy Henry, pictured.

Henry's casting in Holby City was announced in August 2010. He deemed Hanssen "a bit of a mystery man", sent to the hospital by the Department of Health to make budget cuts. Executive producer Belinda Campbell commented that Henry was a "great asset" to the cast, expanding: "His character will make waves from his very first scene and upset the apple cart of Holby City in more ways than one." Henry shadowed Daren Francis, a surgeon at a North London hospital and Holby City's general surgical advisor, as research for the role. He described Hanssen as "punctilious, pedantic and passionate about his work", but with a dry sense of humour, essential for his rivalry of Connie. He explained that Hanssen is not afraid of making enemies and relishes his Machiavellian tendencies, attributing his fractious relationship with Connie to their mutual God complexes and arrogance. Henry considers Hanssen willing to goad people "to go out of their depth", with an ability to frequently "wrong-foot" others. What's on TV deemed Hanssen "Holby's very own George Osborne".

Hanssen was initially presented as an "unknown quantity", including to Henry, who knew little of his character's backstory. In an interview with TV Choice, Henry stated that he believed Hanssen to have come from a "rather unfortunate background". He was sent from Sweden to attend public school in Britain, possibly following the death of his mother, resulting in him becoming "a little more pedantic and English than the English." As of October 2010, his family and love-life had not been decided upon, but it was suggested to Henry that while Hanssen was at medical school, he entered a relationship which did not work out and had not had a romance since. Henry commented that it was possible Hanssen was gay or bisexual, and that an upcoming storyline with a younger female mentee may involve unrequited love. In November 2010, media entertainment website Digital Spy announced that Laila Rouass had been cast as Sahira Shah, a surgeon who shares a "dark history" with Hanssen, who has guided her career.

Henry appears as Hanssen in a two-part crossover episode with Holby City's sister show, Casualty, originally broadcast in March 2019.

=== Departure ===
On 25 August 2013, it was announced that Henry had decided to quit his role as Hanssen and would be leaving towards the end of the year. Henry said how "wonderful" it was to play Hanssen, because he is "such a weird man, but fun to play." He also commented on how delightful it was to work with the cast and crew of Holby City. Simon Harper also commented on Guy's performance as Hanssen: “His brooding, enigmatic performance delivered one of the truly great Holby characters.” Henry did an interview with Digital Spy, discussing his final episode on 7 October (the day before his exit scenes aired). Speaking of his final episode, Henry said: "As usual, what he [Hanssen] does is go into mega-vicious mode. But he does also face a challenge, because he has to do a type of surgery which he hasn't done since he was a junior doctor years and years ago. This frightens him and challenges him. So there's quite a lot of operating to be done!" Henry said highlights of his time at Holby City was the storyline with Dylan, in his first episodes, working with Laila Rouass (Sahira Shah), Paul Bradley (Elliot Hope), James Anderson (Oliver Valentine) and Jimmy Akingbola (Antoine Malick). Henry also revealed that when he renewed his contract in 2012, he told the producers that he would not be renewing his contract after that. Throughout the interview, Henry spoke very highly about how pleased he was with his final episode. When asked whether he may return in future, Henry said, "Who knows?".

=== Return ===
On 30 October 2014, Daniel Kilkelly of Digital Spy reported Henry had reprised the role and Hanssen would be returning in spring 2015. His return was announced alongside those of Oliver Valentine (James Anderson) and Essie Harrison (Kaye Wragg). Kilkelly said Henrik would cause "waves" upon his return, after deciding to bring his "surgical brilliance" back to Holby. Henry expressed his gratitude at being able to bring Hanssen back, saying "He's such a weird and wonderful character to play - I've missed him! And the cast and crew at Holby are such fun to work with - I've missed them too. We don't know what dark acts may have befallen Henrik during his time away in Sweden but I do believe that, when he looms down the corridors of Holby once more, his wit and his scalpel will be as incisive as ever!" Executive producer Oliver Kent commented on how the news should "excite Holby fans old and new" and he was "delighted to welcome back Hanssen, Oliver and Essie as they were popular with viewers. Henry began filming in January 2015.

When Guy Self (John Michie) stepped down as CEO to head up a neurology centre, Serena contacted Hanssen about taking over the vacant position. Hanssen's first scenes saw him sitting in his car scrolling through pictures of the staff on his iPad. As the team speculated about who the new CEO was, Hanssen "looms in the doorway". Henry explained that Hanssen had barely changed and was still "a bit of a weirdo!" Hanssen immediately set about changing Guy's regime, setting up a clash between the pair. Henry told a South Wales Echo reporter, "Henrik profoundly disagrees with the way he has been running the place. Hanssen will be sparring with the surgeon." Henry also teased the reason why Hanssen had returned to Holby, after an attempted reconciliation with his family, commenting, "what went wrong?" Shortly after returning to Holby, Hanssen also made a guest appearance in Casualty on 11 July. He has since made several appearances in Casualty.

During the episode broadcast on 25 October 2016, Hanssen left Holby for Sweden. He also needed to deal with his depression. Producers confirmed that the character had not made a permanent exit from the show and would be returning in the future.

== Reception ==
For his portrayal of Hanssen, Henry was nominated for Best Soap Actor (Male) at the 2018 Digital Spy Reader Awards; he came in eleventh place with 3.1% of the total votes.

Hanssen's initial appearances received positive reviews from critics. The Daily Mirror's Jane Simon commended Henry's debut, writing that he was "off to a head-start, carrying off the haughty, brisk arrogance of a top consultant." What's on TV similarly commented that "Henry has a ball playing Holby's new top dog, stealing all the best lines as he adds a wonderful slice of cutting humour to proceedings." Another positive review of Hanssen came from Becky Jones of the Leicester Mercury, who deemed him "the best thing about the programme", with all of the best lines. Rebecca Jordan of OntheBox enjoyed Henry's "sarcastic yet strangely affable" character, comparing him to Gregory House for his ability to diagnose patients "nearly as fast as he distributes withering one-liners." Jordan pinpointed Hanssen's appeal as being the "much-needed humour" he brought to the series, as well as the dynamic between Hanssen and Connie, writing that "the volatile rapport between him and Connie is thoroughly engaging and leaves little doubt in our minds that he will quickly become an exciting addition to the show." What's on TV selected the episode "The Short Straw" as the "Top TV" choice of the day, commenting that "some of the script is a little heavy-handed, but Guy Henry as panto-esque axeman Henrik is particularly good fun". Sarah Ellis writing for Inside Soap said "He's great – but I'm still very glad that he's not my boss!"

In April 2011, The Guardian's Daniel Maier wrote that Hanssen was "the best thing about Holby". Maier observed that "he is unerringly calm and logical and as such represents the voice of the viewer when irrational behaviour threatens to glibly generate plot. Continuing drama is nothing without secrets, unkeepable promises, anger and jealousy and yet Hanssen unerringly roots these out and placidly advises his charges to get on with the job. He's pure quiet efficiency gold when he should be dramatic poison." The character's return proved popular with critics and viewers. A South Wales Echo reporter stated, "The boss is back. Henrik Hanssen, one of Holby's truly great characters, has returned to rattle staff and delight his many fans." Sara Wallis of the Daily Mirror observed, "Hanssen is not a man to crack a smile at the best of times but he's particularly moody as Guy shamelessly tries to wrestle control of Holby."
