= Adam Astill =

British actor

- Occupation: Actor
- Years active: 1999–present

Adam Astill is an English actor known for his roles as Simon Bennett in the BBC television drama series Mistresses (2008–2010), Dan Hamilton in the BBC medical drama Holby City (2011–2012), Anthony Harker in the BBC soap opera Doctors (2016) and Luke Browning in the BBC soap opera EastEnders (2017) and Miles Titchener in the BBC Radio 4 drama The Archers (2023).

== Filmography ==
=== Film ===
Year	Title	Role	Notes
1999	Julie and the Cadillacs	Gus	
2008	Last Chance Harvey	Business Man	
2009	Hard Times	Brendan Doyle	
2010	Abroad	Nigel	TV movie
2014	Bypass	Doctor	
2016	Letters from Baghdad	Sgt. Frank Stafford	Documentary Film
2017	All the Money in the World	Getty Oil Landman	
2018	Kill Ben Lyk	Officer Hawkins	
2019	Rupert, Rupert & Rupert	Angus McFadden	

=== Television ===
Year	Title	Role	Notes
1999	The Bill	Barton St P.C.	Episode: "Sweet Sixteen"
2000	Coupling	Barman	Episode: "Sex, Death & Nudity & Size Matters"
2001	Beast	Big Dog Owner	Episode: "Cow"
2001	Silent Witness	TV Reporter	Episode: "Faith"
2001	The Savages	Trendy Man	Episode: "Learning to Cook"
2002	Black Books	Construction Worker	Episode: "Fever"
2002	Believe Nothing	King of Norway	Episode: "The Unhappy Eater"
2002	My Family	Tom	Episode: "Misery"
2003	The Last Detective	Trevor	Episode: "Moonlight"
2004	Hollyoaks	Mr Phillips	
2004	All About Me	Policeman	Episode: "Downloading"
2006	Hotel Babylon	Husband	Episode: #1.2
2006	The Amazing Mrs Pritchard	Teacher	Episode: #1.3
2006	EastEnders	D.C. Bull	3 episodes
2007	Roman Mysteries	Phrixus	Episode: "The Dolphins of Laurentum"
2008	Casualty	Nigel Greenway	Episode: "I Can Hear the Grass Grow"
2008	Harley Street	Tom	Episode: #1.3
2009	Monday Monday	Dan	Episode: #1.4
2010	The Bill	Dr. Josh Thomas	Episode: "Be a Man"
2010	Spirit Warriors	Trix's Dad	Episode: "The Cave of Ghosts"
2008	Doctors	Dave Woodhouse	Episode: "Kiss of Death"
2008–2010	Mistresses	Simon Bennett	Series regular
2011	Secret Diary of a Call Girl	Liam	2 episodes
2011	Doggett & Ephgrave's Comedy	Dad	Series regular
2011	Rosamunde Pilcher	William	Episode: "Herzensfragen"
2011–2012	Holby City	Dan Hamilton	Series regular
2012	Crime Stories	Andy Collins	Episode: #1.15
2013	Father Brown	Rev Wilfred Bohun	Episode: "The Hammer of God"
2013	Doctors	Elliot Carver	Episode: "Remission"
2013	Law & Order	Gareth Wilks	Episode: "Dependent"
2013	Toast of London	PC Thomas Ledger	Episode: "Submission"
2014	Birds of a Feather	Julian	Episode: "You Can't Always Get What You Want"
2014	Rosamunde Pilcher	Freddie	Episode: "Evitas Rache"
2014	New Tricks	Lee Connery	Episode: "In Vino Veritas"
2013–2014	Our Girl	Major Beck	4 episodes
2014	Coronation Street	Dominic Saul	3 episodes
2015	World's End	Marcus Roberts	Main role
2015	Humans	Journalist	Series one
2015	Unforgotten	Matt Slater	Series One
2016	Doctors	Anthony Harker	Series regular
2017	EastEnders	Luke Browning	Series regular
2018–2019	Andy's Safari Adventures	Mr. Hammond	Main role
2019	Treadstone	Andy Moore	3 episodes
2020	Grantchester	Frank Martin	Episode: #5.6
2020	Andy's Aquatic Adventures	Mr. Hammond	Series regular

== Awards and nominations ==
Year	Award	Category	Nominated work	Result	Ref.
2016	The British Soap Awards	Villain of the Year	Doctors	Nominated	
