= Sunday Mercury =

British tabloid newspaper

- Type: Weekly newspaper
- Format: Tabloid
- Owner(s): Reach plc
- Editor: David Brookes
- Founded: 29 December 1918
- Political alignment: Populist
- Language: English
- Headquarters: Birmingham, England
- Circulation: 3,622 (as of 2023)
- Website: www.sundaymercury.net

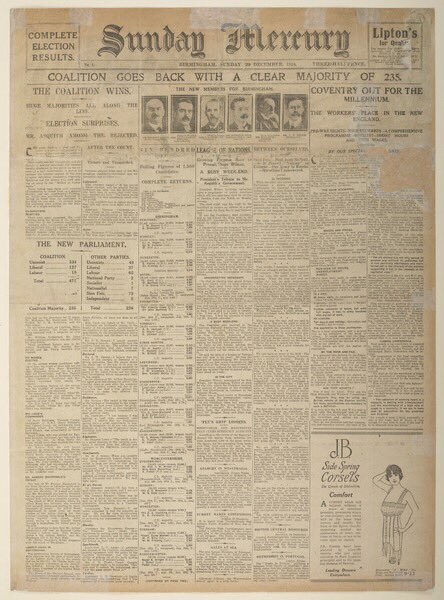
Cover of the first edition, 29 December 1918

Sunday Mercury is a Sunday tabloid published in Birmingham, UK, and now owned by Reach plc.

== History ==
The first edition was published on 29 December 1918. The first editor was John Turner Fearon (1869–1937), who left the Dublin-based Freeman's Journal to take up the position.

David Brookes, who edited the Mercury between 2000 and 2008, returned to Birmingham in November 2009 and is now responsible for the Sunday Mercury as Editor-in-Chief along with the Birmingham Post and Birmingham Mail.

The paper had a circulation of more than 60,000 in 2006 but the average had dropped to below 25,000 in 2014.
