= Graham Mitchell (writer) =

British television screenwriter

Graham Mitchell is a British television screenwriter, most known for crime dramas. He has written 27 episodes of The Bill, as well as being the lead writer on the 2005 live episode.

== Career ==
He has also written for the Casualty, Mersey Beat, Holby City, and The Body Farm. He was part of the regular core writing team on the awarding-winning spin-off HolbyBlue. During its lifespan, HolbyBlue was nominated for six awards: Best Drama at the Inside Soap Awards in 2007 and 2008; Best New Drama Series at the TV Quick & TV Choice Awards; actresses Zöe Lucker and Kacey Ainsworth for Best Actress, also at the TV Quick and Inside Soap Awards, and actor Jimmy Akingbola for Best Male Performance in TV at the Screen Nation Awards. Since 2014, he's been writing for the long-running crime drama Silent Witness.
