= Laila Rouass =

English actress (born 1971)

- Born: Laila Abdesselam; 22 June 1971 (age 55); Stepney, London, England
- Years active: 1994–present
- Spouse(s): Abselam Rouass (m. 1990; div. 2003) Ronnie O'Sullivan (m. 2025)
- Partner(s): Nasir Khan (2005–2008); James Petrie (2010–2011)
- Children: 1

Laila Rouass (née Abdesselam; born 22 June 1971) is an English actress. On television, she is known for her roles as in the ITV series Footballers' Wives (2004–2006) and Primeval (2009), the BBC One soap opera Holby City (2011–2012, 2021) and series Spooks (2009), and the Netflix series Safe (2018). She was also a contestant on Strictly Come Dancing (2009), in which she finished fourth.

== Early life ==
Laila Abdesselam was born on 22 June 1971 to a Moroccan mother and father and grew up with six siblings in Tower Hamlets in the East End of London. She was raised Muslim but is now non-practising, although she calls the Islamic faith an important part of her identity.

== Career ==
Rouass worked as a VJ on Channel V in India in the 1990s. While on Channel V, she appeared in a music video for the band Colour Blind, directed by the then creative head of the channel, Shamin Desai.

After moving back to the UK, Rouass became famous for playing the role of Bollywood actress Amber Gates in the cult ITV1 series Footballers' Wives between 2004 and 2006 and, albeit briefly, in the ITV2 spin-off series Footballers' Wives: Extra Time. She also played recurring roles in the British soaps Family Affairs and Hollyoaks, as well as appearing in episodes of I Dream, Casualty and Meet the Magoons. She starred alongside Meera Syal in the television adaptation of Syal's novel Life Isn't All Ha Ha Hee Hee.

Rouass was ranked No.87 and No.69 on FHM 100 Sexiest Women in the World 2004 and FHM 100 Sexiest Women in the World 2005 respectively.

In 2009 she appeared as Egyptologist Sarah Page in the third series of the ITV science-fiction series Primeval. She left the show when the location of filming was changed to Dublin for series four and five, saying it would be hard to continue participating, for she was a single parent; and her character was subsequently killed off-screen between the third and fourth series.

In spring of 2010, Rouass announced that she would be making a film about Leila Khaled, who led the hijacking of a flight from Rome to Athens in 1969. Rouass stated she had funding for the film.

She played Maya Lahan, a regular character introduced in the ninth series of BBC One drama Spooks which broadcast from September 2010. She guest starred as the evil Colonel Karim in The Sarah Jane Adventures in October 2010. Rouass then joined the cast of the BBC medical drama Holby City, appearing from February 2011 as registrar Sahira Shah. She left Holby City on 17 April 2012, after just 14 months on the show, to take a break to spend time with her family. She returned to the role of Sahira Shah on 9 February 2021.

In 2014 She Appeared In Midsomer Murders as Stephanie King in The Flying Club & then return again as Vanessa Debouverie in 2022 episode A Grain of Truth

She is also currently one of the presenters of "The Channel 4 TV Book Club".

In July 2024, it was announced that Rouass would be joining the BBC soap opera EastEnders as Ayesha Siddhu, a woman from Suki Panesar's past.

=== Strictly Come Dancing ===
She participated in the seventh series of Strictly Come Dancing, a BBC One reality show, paired with professional dancer Anton Du Beke, and alongside Footballers' Wives co-star Zöe Lucker.

The pair made it to the last four before being voted off the show on 6 December 2009. She was unable to participate in the final on 19 December 2009 to reprise her partnership with Anton Du Beke due to a last-minute personal emergency.

=== Film career ===
Rouass' first film was City of Dreams produced by Feroze Nadiawala, in which she starred opposite Lisa Ray and Saeed Jaffrey. During the years that she was based in India, early in her career, she acted in some Indian films, Aditya Bhattacharya's Indo-Italian Senso unico (1999) and Dev Benegal's Split Wide Open (1999).

In 2000, Rouass starred in Jag Mhundra's controversial film, Bawandar (English title; The Sand Storm), about revenge rapes in Rajasthan, and she made her English-language film debut in 2002 with a small role in The Four Feathers opposite Heath Ledger.

She starred in The Hunt Feast (2004), and in 2006 she was cast in Aditya Raj Kapoor's film Don't Stop Dreaming.

Rouass also appeared in the independent British film Shoot on Sight (2007) opposite Brian Cox, Om Puri and Sadie Frost. In 2008, she appeared in two films, Freebird and the New Zealand funded Apron Strings.

Rouass appeared in the Harlan Coben Netflix original 8 part mini-series Safe where she played Lauren Marshall.

== Personal life ==
In 1990, she married family friend Abdeslam Rouass, but the couple divorced in 2003 without having consummated their marriage. Rouass then lived with London businessman Nasir Khan, with whom she held a commitment ceremony in 2005 before family and friends. She later faced criticism for referring to herself and Khan as a married couple, even though the ceremony had no legal standing. She gave birth to their daughter Inez in February 2007, but ended her relationship with Khan shortly afterwards. In 2011, Khan was sentenced to nine years in prison for his money-laundering role in a £250 million VAT fraud conspiracy.

From 2010 to 2011, Rouass dated celebrity chef James Petrie. In 2012, she began dating professional snooker player Ronnie O'Sullivan, to whom she became engaged in February 2013. Rouass and O'Sullivan appeared together as guests on BBC's Saturday Kitchen in February 2021. In February 2022, Rouass announced on social media that the couple had ended their relationship, but they subsequently reconciled before separating again in September 2024. They reconciled again in January 2025 and married in June of that year. She features in the 2023 documentary about his playing career, Ronnie O'Sullivan: The Edge of Everything.

In August 2017, Rouass was caught up in the Barcelona terrorist attack, writing on Twitter during the incident that she was hiding in a restaurant freezer.

== Filmography ==
Film performances
Year	Title	Role	Notes
1999	Senso unico	Yasmine	
1999	Split Wide Open	Nandita	
2000	Bawandar	Amy	
2002	The Four Feathers	Maya	
2003	Two Minutes	Sonita	Short film
2007	Shoot on Sight	Ruby Kaur	
2007	A Cheat in the Park	Laila	Short film
2008	Apron Strings	Anita	
2008	Freebird	Lucinda	
2011	Conan the Barbarian	Fialla, Conan's Mother	

Television performances
Year	Title	Role	Notes
2001	Family Affairs	Tanya Ayuba	2 episodes
2002	Comedy Lab	The Unbelievably Beautiful Woman	Episode: "Meet the Magoons"
2002	Casualty	Mandy Kellaway	Episode: "You're Going Home in the Back of an Ambulance"
2003	Hollyoaks	Dale Jackson	35 episodes
2004	I Dream	Lollie Das	Episode: "Toone in Love"
2004–2006	Footballers' Wives	Amber Gates	22 episodes
2005	Life Isn't All Ha Ha Hee Hee	Tania	Mini-series, 3 episodes
2005	Footballers' Wives: Extra Time	Amber Gates	3 episodes
2005	Meet the Magoons	Anita	Episode: "Stairway to Havan"
2006	Casualty	Gina Marshall	Episode: "All Through the Night"
2009	Primeval	Sarah Page	Main cast. Series 3, 10 episodes
2010	The Sarah Jane Adventures	Colonel Tia Karim	2 episodes: "Death of the Doctor: Parts One & Two"
2010	Spooks	Maya Lahan	7 episodes
2011–2012, 2021	Holby City	Sahira Shah	Main cast, 60 episodes
2011	Sadie J	Maddy	Episode: "Robobootylicious"
2014	Midsomer Murders	Stephanie King	Episode: "The Flying Club"
2015–2016	The Royals	Rani, Deputy Prime Minister	5 episodes
2016	Stella	Maria	8 episodes
2016	The Lodge	Olivia	4 episodes
2018	Safe	Lauren Marshall	Mini-series, 5 episodes
2018	Age Before Beauty	Shameem Shah	3 episodes
2022	Traces	Azra McKinven	6 episodes
2022	Midsomer Murders	Vanessa Debouverie	Episode: "A Grain of Truth"
2023	The Effects of Lying	Sangeeta	Television film
2023	London Kills	DI Yasmin Rafiq	2 episodes: "Wake-up Call" and "Vandetta"
2024	Tell Me Everything	Samira	Series 2, Episode 2
2024	EastEnders	Ayesha Siddhu	Guest appearance

== Awards and nominations ==
Year	Award	Category	Work	Result	Ref.
2003	The British Soap Awards	Sexiest Female	Hollyoaks	Nominated	
2012	17th National Television Awards	Drama Performance: Female	Holby City	Nominated	
