= Edward MacLiam =

Irish actor (born 1976)

- Born: Edward Wilson; 1976 (age 48–49); County Cork, Ireland
- Education: University College Cork; RADA
- Occupation: Actor
- Years active: 1993–present
- Television: Holby City; Doctors

Edward MacLiam (born Edward Wilson in 1976) is an Irish actor, known for his roles as Greg Douglas in the BBC medical drama Holby City and identical twins Adam and Gareth Regan in the BBC soap opera Doctors. MacLiam also portrayed Conor in the 2013 film Run & Jump, for which he was nominated for an Irish Film & Television Award for Best Supporting Actor.

== Filmography ==
| Year | Title | Role | Notes |
|---|---|---|---|
| 2004 | The Year London Blew Up: 1974 | | Television film |
| 2005 | Murder in Suburbia | Stewart | 1 episode |
| 2005 | Coronation Street | Tim White | 8 episodes |
| 2005 | Heartbeat | Rick | 1 episode |
| 2006 | Kenneth Williams: Fantabulosa! | Private Ed | Television film |
| 2006 | Sugar Rush | Mark | 1 episode |
| 2006 | Waking the Dead | Joe MacDonagh | 2 episodes |
| 2006 | The Last Detective | Adam Bett | 1 episode |
| 2007 | Angel | | Film |
| 2007 | Miss Conception | Ben | Film |
| 2007 | Love Soup | James | 1 episode |
| 2007 | The Eejits | Conor | Television film |
| 2008 | EastEnders | Jamie Stewart | 1 episode |
| 2009 | Doctors | Michael Roth | 1 episode |
| 2009 | Above Suspicion 2 | Richard Reynolds | 2 episodes |
| 2009 | The Turn of the Screw | Peter Quint | Television film |
| 2010–2012 | Holby City | Greg Douglas | Series regular |
| 2013 | Run & Jump | Conor | Film |
| 2013 | Big Thunder | Dr Grant Carson | Television film |
| 2013 | DCI Banks | David Hornby | 6 episodes |
| 2013 | Charlie | Ray MacSharry | 1 episode |
| 2014 | Cucumber | Gregory | 1 episode |
| 2015 | Ordinary Lies | Niall | 1 episode |
| 2015 | Midsomer Murders | Noah Sawney | 1 episode |
| 2016 | Endeavour | Dr. Kane | 1 episode |
| 2017 | Paula | Philip Byrden | 2 episodes |
| 2017 | Silent Witness | Adam Hayes | 1 episode |
| 2018 | Come Home | Billy Rockwell | 2 episodes |
| 2019 | Doctors | Adam Regan/Gareth Regan | Recurring dual roles |
