= Serena Campbell =

Fictional surgeon in BBC drama Holby City

- Holby City character
- Catherine Russell as Serena Campbell
- First appearance: "Coercion"; 1 May 2012
- Last appearance: "Episode 1102"; 29 March 2022
- Portrayed by: Catherine Russell
- Spinoff(s): Casualty (2019)

In-universe information
- Occupation: Consultant general surgeon, Clinical lead (AAU); Medical director; (prev. Acting chief executive officer, Deputy chief executive officer)
- Family: Adrienne McKinnie (mother); Marjorie Haynes (half-sister); Jason Haynes (nephew)
- Spouse: Edward Campbell (divorced)
- Significant others: Robbie Medcalf; Bernie Wolfe
- Children: Elinor Campbell (daughter)

Serena Campbell is a fictional character from the BBC medical drama Holby City, played by Catherine Russell. She first appeared in the fourteenth series episode "Coercion", broadcast on 1 May 2012. Serena is a consultant general surgeon and formerly Holby General Hospital's deputy CEO. She was introduced along with two other regular characters by the show's then executive producer Johnathan Young, who wanted more "truthful and complicated" characters in the series. Serena was originally Frankie Renard, but the name was changed as the producers thought it was "terrible". Russell auditioned for the role and attended a second call back where she was made up in Serena's costume and make-up. After being cast, the actress was given advice about Serena's profession from a female surgeon to help her prepare for the part. Aspects of Russell's personality traits were incorporated into the character of Serena after she was cast.

Serena is portrayed as being candid, professional, manipulative and efficient. She also has an MBA from Harvard University making her a good manager, as well as a good surgeon. Russell commented that Serena did not care what people thought about her. Serena was brought to the hospital by Henrik Hanssen (Guy Henry) to help the place run more efficiently. She immediately clashed with Ric Griffin (Hugh Quarshie). Further exploration of Serena's background began when her mother, Adrienne (Sandra Voe), and daughter, Elinor (Charlotte Hope; Amy McCallum), were introduced, followed by her ex-husband, Edward (Aden Gillett), in 2013. He and Serena briefly reconciled until she learned that he was a secret alcoholic. Serena also faced disappointment when she was passed over for the job of CEO again. In 2014, she had to cope with Adrienne's vascular dementia diagnosis and the worsening of her condition.

Producers created a long-lost sister and nephew for Serena in 2016. Her nephew, Jason Haynes (Jules Robertson), has Asperger syndrome and Serena takes over his care. She was also given a love interest in the form of police officer Robbie Medcalf (Mark Healy). Serena was paired with trauma surgeon Bernie Wolfe (Jemma Redgrave) in late 2016, first professionally and later romantically. Russell took a break in early 2017 to star in a play and returned the following year. After seven years in the role, Russell made the decision to leave Holby City, and her final scenes aired on 21 January 2020. She reprised the role in 2022 for the show's final series, along with Redgrave. Both the character and Russell's portrayal of her have received a positive response from television critics.

== Creation and casting ==
On 29 March 2012, it was announced that three new regular characters would make their debuts during Holby City's fourteenth series in May 2012. Actress Catherine Russell joined the cast as Serena Campbell, alongside Chizzy Akudolu as Mo Effanga and Michael Thomson as Jonny Maconie. Serena was introduced as a "charmingly candid and utterly professional" consultant general surgeon. Of the new characters, the show's executive producer. Johnathan Young, commented "These are three very talented actors and I am delighted to welcome them to the cast. There are some dramatic and exciting storylines coming up on Holby City over the next few months and I know our new additions will have an immediate impact." Young later stated that he had wanted to introduce more "truthful and complicated" characters to the series.

When the character of Serena was first created, she was initially called Frankie Renard, a name producers Oliver Kent and Simon Harper said was "terrible". Russell auditioned for the role and admitted that she was nervous when she attended a second recall in front of the producers. She likened the experience to "a movie screen test", as she was made up in Serena's costume and make-up. Russell said Holby City was "a lovely place to work" and believed that she was cast partly because she gets on with the job and fitted in well with the other cast members. To help her prepare for the role, Russell was given advice about Serena's profession from a female surgeon. After Russell was cast, some of her personality traits, including her "quirkiness and subversive naughtiness", were incorporated into the character of Serena.

Russell appears as Serena in a two-part crossover episode with Holby City's sister show, Casualty, originally broadcast in March 2019.

== Development ==
=== Characterisation ===
The show's official website describes Serena as being candid, professional and "an unapologetic achiever and fearless architect of change." Serena has an MBA from Harvard University, and Russell commented that in addition to being a good surgeon, Serena is also a good manager. She also told Collins that Serena "occasionally takes efficiency too far". Speaking with Katy Moon of Inside Soap, Russell called Serena "the queen of manipulation" and a big flirt. Serena often uses her flirting skills as a weapon to get what she wants and leads from her head, instead of her heart. Russell hoped Serena would have a love interest, as she was "all for having a snog".

When a What's on TV columnist branded Serena "a bit cold-hearted", Russell defended her explaining that she had a great bedside manner, but she did not care what people thought about her, which made her "so scary". She stated "Serena Campbell does not give a damn whether you like her or not!" In September 2014, Russell told Digital Spy's Daniel Kilkelly that she enjoyed playing Serena as she was such "a multi-dimensional character" with both fun and serious sides to her. Russell also stated that a genuine friendship would develop between Serena and Raf di Lucca (Joe McFadden), and they would enjoy some "drunken evenings" together.

=== Career at Holby ===
"Well, it is a very tricky relationship and I think she's still smarting from the fact that he's got the job that should have been hers. I don't think she feels she needs to prove herself to him, but Serena's a perfectionist, so she wants to show him she's got all bases covered."

— Russell on Serena and Guy Self.

Serena was recruited by Henrik Hanssen (Guy Henry) to help "run things more efficiently and make the figures work". Serena immediately clashed with her new colleague Ric Griffin (Hugh Quarshie), but Russell stated that they both wanted what was best for their patients. When Serena treated a cancer patient with innovative surgery against Ric's advice, it sparked "a power game" between them. Russell said Serena also wanted to get in the middle of Ric's working relationship with Antoine Malick (Jimmy Akingbola), and get Malick on her side. Russell also said that Ric and Serena would have a "love-hate relationship" and hinted that they could form a romantic connection in the future, as they were both single.

In June 2012, Serena's work and personal lives clashed when her teenage daughter, Elinor (Charlotte Hope), arrived on the wards with her friend Gabby (Georgina Campbell). When Serena confronted her daughter, Elinor revealed that she and Gabby had drunk alcohol and taken ecstasy. Gabby was also suffering from an ectopic pregnancy, which forced Serena and Ric to team up and save her. Serena was "glad of Ric's help" and the pair bonded over parenthood. However, they clashed again when Serena interfered in Ric's treatment of her mother Adrienne (Sandra Voe). After she was informed that Adrienne was not a priority, Serena managed to get her a theatre slot, leaving Ric to threaten to report her. Following Adrienne's surgical procedure, nurse Chantelle Lane (Lauren Drummond) did not perform vital post-op checks and Adrienne suffered a stroke. A "distraught" Serena blamed Chantelle for her mother's condition.

Serena later insisted that the Acute Assessment Unit (AAU) should not refer patients to Keller ward, but when it started to cause problems, she had "a crisis of confidence". Serena later backed down when Chrissie Williams (Tina Hobley) wanted to bring a patient, with a degloving injury to her leg, up to Keller. Chrissie told Serena about the history of the patient and gave her photographs of her injury. Russell stated that Serena could not resist the chance to operate as the area of surgery was her speciality. However, Serena wanted to perform the operation on AAU and asked Chrissie to join her in surgery, as she was impressed by her. Serena also wanted Chrissie to move to Keller and be close by her side, as she realised Chrissie had no problems standing up to authority figures. Serena was later reunited with Imelda Cousins (Tessa Peake-Jones) when she was appointed acting CEO of the hospital. Serena and Imelda previously worked together, but Serena does not immediately recall Imelda, as the last time they met Imelda was overweight. Peake-Jones commented "It takes a little while for Serena to realise their shared memories!"

After acting as CEO following Hanssen's departure, Serena was not pleased when Guy Self (John Michie) was then appointed CEO over her. Serena was unaware of Guy's arrival and when she demanded to know who he was, he informed her in "no uncertain terms" that he was her new boss and she would have to watch herself. When Guy and Serena had to go into theatre together, Michie commented that Guy was threatened by her. In May 2014, Serena suffered a particular stressful day when Guy asked her to file a report early and Adrienne turned up at the hospital. Serena found Adrienne's presence "extremely irritating" and had to show restraint when Adrienne used Serena's laptop and lost the report she was working on. At the same time, Serena was trying to treat a patient, Lennie Keane (Mark Bagnall), who had been admitted with a broken shoulder, but everything went "pear-shaped" with him and his son. At the end of the day, Serena was "shattered" and Russell called it "one of the lowest points you'll ever see with Serena." Serena turned to alcohol to cope with the stress and a What's on TV columnist wondered if it was leading to the beginning of a downward spiral for the character.

=== Edward's introduction ===
On 6 April 2013, it was announced that actor Aden Gillett had been cast as Serena's ex-husband Edward Campbell, a consultant anaesthetist who takes a locum position at the hospital. Edward used his new job to try and win his ex back. Russell told a What's on TV reporter that Serena and Edward had an acrimonious divorce around 15 years ago due to his infidelity. Serena was surprised to see Edward at the hospital and "totally loses it" with him when he makes a comment about her to Malick, while they are treating a patient. Russell commented, "You never really see that from Serena because she's usually so in control. But she's furious she's been made to look like a silly, weak girl in front of her team." When Edward apologised, Russell believed that it showed he still had feelings for Serena. However, she was convinced that he had not changed at all, as he openly flirted with the nurses.

Serena and Edward later re-kindled their relationship, and planned a trip away with their daughter for Christmas. Russell commented that Edward had wanted to "get his feet back under the table with Serena for years". Serena soon learned that Edward had had a brief relationship with nurse Mary-Claire Carter (Niamh McGrady) and that he was a secret alcoholic. Russell thought Serena was quite grown up about Edward and Mary-Claire's fling, as it happened while they were separated. However, she was shocked to learn that Edward had been drinking at work and almost killed a patient. Serena also felt humiliated because she had stood up for Edward when he blamed Mary-Claire for the incident. Russell told Moon that Serena felt like an "utter idiot" and added "I'd have been in floods of tears if someone had let me down as badly as Edward does Serena."

=== Adrienne's dementia ===
Serena's mother Adrienne (Voe) was later diagnosed with vascular dementia in May 2014 and Serena became her carer. She struggled to cope when Adrienne's symptoms accelerated and was "out of her depth" when Adrienne was admitted to the hospital after smashing up mirrors in the house and getting a shard of glass in her leg. Russell explained that as the storyline progressed Adrienne would become more aggressive, while Serena would try to keep the severity of her mother's condition a secret, as she worries that Guy will recognise she cannot cope. Russell had advice for character: "Serena needs to learn it's not a weakness to ask for help. It doesn't mean you're not a loving daughter or son if you put your hand up. Serena needs to admit she can't cope on her own." Serena received some support from Ric while he treated Adrienne's leg. He used music therapy to calm her down. Russell stated that while the subject matter was dark, there would be moments of humour during the storyline. The show's producers worked with the Alzheimer's Society on the storyline, while Russell also did some research, including taking three online dementia tests.

Russell admitted that the storyline wore her out, but she hoped some good work came out of it. When Adrienne was readmitted to the hospital, Adrian Fletcher (Alex Walkinshaw) and Raf di Lucca discovered she was covered in bruises. Adrienne then blamed Serena for being aggressive towards her and stealing her rings. Fletch and Raf are placed in the "uncomfortable and difficult position" of having to confront Serena about Adrienne's allegations. Russell believed that Serena found comfort knowing that she could help influence her mother's care while Adrienne was at the hospital. But she also realised that it was against hospital protocol to treat a family member and handed Adrienne's care over to Raf. When Adrienne's dementia worsened, she had a moment of lucidity and asked Serena to help end her life. Russell said Serena was "very shocked and upset" by her mother's request and refused to do it. Russell found the scenes a challenge to play as she had opposing views to Serena about the issue. Adrienne later took the decision out of Serena's hands by signing a DNR. She died shortly after suffering another stroke. Russell said she was moved by the feedback she had received for the storyline and was glad of the opportunity to play it.

=== Love interest and nephew ===
Towards the end of 2015, the show's producers promised some big changes ahead for Serena. First, she was given a love interest in the form of policeman Robbie Medcalf (Mark Healy). Russell was pleased by the development and commented that it was "about bloody time!" The actress joked that the younger characters were always "nipping off into the hospital laundry rooms and having guilt-free snogs", and believed that just because Serena was middle-aged, it did not mean she was not interested in having a relationship. The second change for Serena was the introduction of a long-lost sister and nephew. Serena was unaware that she had a sister and when she tried to find her, Serena learned that she was dead. Shortly after, Serena met her nephew Jason Haynes (Jules Robertson). She emailed him to explain who she was, where she worked and that they should meet sometime. Jason took it literally and turned up at Holby during Serena's shift. He told her he had Asperger syndrome and Serena felt "a little out of her depth", but wanted to get to know him. Russell told Laura-Jayne Tyler of Inside Soap, "Serena wants to build a relationship with Jason, but she has no experience with Aspergers. The drama of the piece is whether or not she'll succeed in understanding his condition and bring him into her life – or she'll find it too stressful." Russell also told Tyler that she had never worked with someone with a form of autism before and met with Robertson before filming to make sure he was comfortable and that they could have a good working relationship.

In an episode broadcast in November 2016, Serena was left "embarrassed" when Robbie turns up on AAU and reveals that they had a one-night stand. Although Robbie is there for a medical reason, they end up discussing their relationship, and Robbie asks Serena to give it another chance. He also suggests that she and Jason move in with him. However, Serena was torn between him and her feelings for colleague Bernie Wolfe (Jemma Redgrave).

=== Relationship with Bernie Wolfe ===
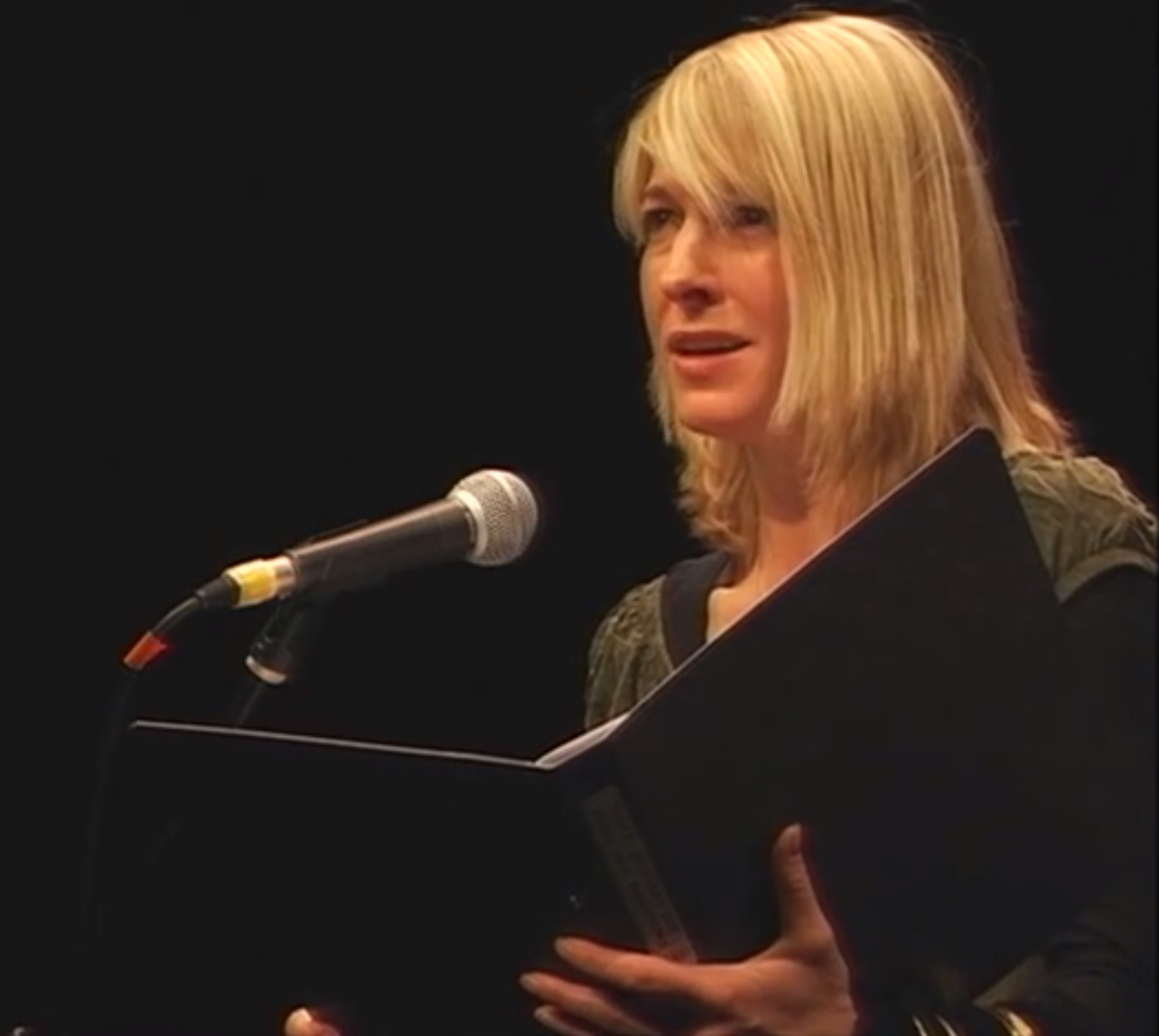
Serena formed a relationship with trauma surgeon Bernie Wolfe, played by Jemma Redgrave (pictured), in 2016.

Following a suspension, Serena returns to AAU and learns trauma surgeon Bernie Wolfe has been tasked with supervising her. An Inside Soap writer noted that "a power struggle" occurs between the two women, which leads Raf and Fletch to bet on who will win. When Serena is challenged during theatre, she has to step back and allow Bernie to proceed with the surgery. Serena feels that her future at Holby is "bleak" and tells Hanssen she wants to resign. Bernie later impresses Serena when she turns AAU into a makeshift trauma unit, following an influx of patients from a train accident. Serena then suggests to Hanssen that they create a proper trauma department within the hospital. An Inside Soap writer noted, "it seems the ice is finally beginning to thaw between the warring women".

Months later, Fletch is stabbed by a patient, and Serena and Bernie work together to save him. Once he is recovering in intensive care, Serena and Bernie slump to the floor outside the theatre and Bernie takes the blame for what happened. As Serena assures her that it was not her fault, and that she is a good person, Bernie kisses Serena. Of her reaction to the kiss, Russell stated, "Well, Serena's surprised and she does pull away initially. Serena totally didn't see it coming but, when it did, I think she was all for it." To convey their characters' emotions during the scene outside the theatre, Russell revealed that she and Redgrave used their sadness at the result of the Brexit vote. The scene was also the last to be filmed that day, so they were both tired and stressed, which contributed to the percieived authenticity of the emotions they portrayed.

When asked by Victoria Wilson of What's on TV about whether there had been any sense of romantic feelings between Serena and Bernie before the kiss, Russell thought there definitely had from Bernie, but neither woman knew what was going to happen. She added, "That said, I think it's bloody obvious to everybody else that that's where it was going!" Russell thought it would interesting to see how Serena deals with the kiss. She also hoped the storyline would have a positive impact on lesbian viewers in particular and she felt "a great responsibility" to get it right. The pairing of Serena and Bernie has been given the portmanteau Berena by fans on social media.

=== Temporary departure and return ===
After five years of playing Serena, Russell made a temporary departure from the show in early 2017 in order to appear in the comedy play What the Butler Saw. She also explained that as her father, Nicholas Smith, has recently died, she needed to sort his things out and "recharge my batteries". Russell admitted that she did not have a return date, but said everyone knew she had not gone for good. She commented, "At the moment I don't miss Serena, as it hasn't been long since I stopped – but when the play finishes and I'm unemployed again, I dare say I'll miss the hospital desperately."

On-screen, Serena struggles to deal with the death of her daughter Elinor and takes her frustration out on junior doctor Jasmine Burrows (Lucinda Dryzek), who failed to spot a change in Elinor's behaviour before she died. Serena becomes "obsessed" with mentoring Jasmine, as she wants to be able to prevent her from making another mistake. Russell thought that Serena had returned to work too soon and that her behaviour was "unfair" towards Jasmine, but she also understood that after the death of a child, a parent would naturally try to blame someone. Russell found the level of Serena's grief "tiring and heart-wrenching" to portray.

Serena eventually finds herself in a position where it is "untenable for her to stay" at Holby. After refusing to accept help from anyone, her behaviour becomes erratic and it appears she may be suicidal. It soon becomes clear that Serena needs professional help, and she leaves the hospital in order to get some counselling. When asked what this meant for Serena and Bernie's relationship, Russell replied "The relationship between them is solid, but there is a question mark over when Serena will come back, and whether they'll maintain their relationship while she's away." Russell hoped that their relationship would continue off-screen. Redgrave left her role as Bernie during Russell's break; onscreen, Bernie left to be with Serena.

On 8 September 2017, Russell confirmed that she would return to filming in October, with Serena's return airing in February 2018. Russell started filming her return scenes during the week commencing 16 October. Serena returns in the twentieth series episode "Not Your Home Now", first broadcast on 7 February 2018. Russell said she is pleased to reprise her role as she feels content that she has completed the things she wanted to do on her break. Serena returns after Hanssen asks her to become the acting CEO while he reassesses his mental health following a shooting at the hospital. Russell explained that Serena returns "out of loyalty" as she has developed a new life while travelling. Since Serena's departure, several events have occurred at the hospital: Jasmine and Raf have died, Ric has been charged for the manslaughter of a patient after leaving the hospital for three hours, and registrar Oliver Valentine (James Anderson) has been shot in the head. On how Serena feels, Russell commented, "For Serena, it's peculiar, weird and sad walking back into a working environment that's completely changed..."

In her absence, Serena has travelled and grieved for Elinor and continued her relationship with Bernie, who is setting up a trauma unit in Nairobi while Serena returns. Russell stated that Serena would prefer to be with Bernie in Nairobi. Ric is admitted onto the AAU after being stabbed with a screwdriver and it emerges that he is subject to several beatings in prison, which "concerns" Serena as she thinks of Ric highly. Unhappy with Ric's imprisonment, Serena works with nurse Donna Jackson (Jaye Jacobs) to figure out why Ric left Elaine Warren, the patient who died, unattended and why he will not explain where he was. Russell said that Serena wants to know why Ric is being "cagey" about his whereabouts. Serena is adamant that she will not stay at Holby for long, and although she misses Bernie, Serena decides to stay in Holby because she realises how much the hospital needs support. Russell explained that Serena feels "selfish" returning to Nairobi. Russell confirmed on 30 January 2018 that Redgrave would reprise her role for two episodes to continue Serena and Bernie's relationship.

=== Departure and return ===
On 30 October 2019, Sophie Dainty of Digital Spy confirmed the character would be departing the show in early 2020, after Russell made the decision to leave the role. Dainty reported that Russell had already filmed her final scenes, and the actress stated: "Playing Serena Campbell and being part of the Holby family has been an absolute delight. I just need to get out there, frighten myself again and pretend to be someone else. But you never know, hopefully I'll be able to revisit the hospital as it really is the most wonderful place to work!" Dainty described Serena's exit as "heroic", and said viewers would see a lot of drama from her final storylines, including "unexpected events" and "a dark reminder from the past."

The character's exit scenes were broadcast on 21 January 2020. Serena leaves Holby after coming into conflict with the hospital's new CEO Max McGerry (Jo Martin). After the episode aired, Russell admitted that she had been thinking about leaving the show for a couple of years. She wanted the chance to play different roles, as she thought playing Serena for any longer would stop being a challenge.

Holby City was cancelled in June 2021 after 23 years on air. Producers invited multiple former cast members to reprise their roles during the show's final series. Both Russell and Redgrave reprised their roles in episode 1095, first broadcast on 8 February 2022. Serena and Bernie return to the hospital after learning Jason has been injured in an accident. The pair later reveal that they are engaged and were set to marry, but the venue changed the date. On 16 March 2022, it was announced that Russell and Redgrave would also appear in the show's final episode, which aired on 29 March 2022.

== Reception ==
For her portrayal of Serena, Russell was nominated for Best Actress at the 2015 TV Choice Awards. She received a nomination for Best Drama Star at the 2018 Inside Soap Awards.

Serena's introduction was praised by the Daily Mirror's Jane Simon, who called her "smiley, confident, a bit playful and professional too". When Serena stopped a relative of a patient from suing Malick, Simon observed she "swoops in on a wave of charm to smooth things over: the proverbial iron fist in a designer velvet glove. We already like Serena a lot." A colleague of Simon's noted that Serena irritated Ric and said "She may appear charming, but it's soon scalpels at dawn." Another commented she was "a woman designed to rub Ric up the wrong way". A What's on TV reporter branded Serena "Holby City's fierce new consultant". While another Daily Mirror reporter remarked "Serena is not to be messed with".

Martin Hoscik from SEENIT thought Serena had been created to fill the stereotypes of "someone new changes things in ways the regulars don't like" and "tough bitch riles her colleagues", both of which, Hoscik pointed out, had already been fulfilled by Hanssen and Jac Naylor (Rosie Marcel). Hoscik added that Serena was "fantastically played" by Russell. A South Wales Echo journalist noted that Serena was "smarting" from Guy stealing her job. When she performed a rectal examination on a patient, they quipped "how the mighty have fallen – she'll be emptying bedpans next week at this rate." Simon (Daily Mirror) thought the show's writers might have it in for "poor" Serena when she had to perform another rectal exam a couple of months later.

Inside Soap's Laura-Jayne Tyler branded Serena "fearless" and wrote that she faced "the toughest decision of her life" when Adrienne asked her to help end her life. A reporter for the Daily Post praised Russell and Voe for their performance during Adrienne's dementia storyline, saying they had "put us all through the emotional wringer for months".
