= Daddy's Girl =

Daddy's Girl or Daddy's Girls may refer to:

== Literature ==
- Daddy's Girl, novel originally written in 1971 (but not published until 1980 because of its incestual content) by Charlotte Vale Allen
- Daddy's Girl (graphic novel), a 1996 graphic novel (also about incest) by Debbie Drechsler
- Daddy's Girls (novel), a 2006 novel by Tasmina Perry
- Daddy's Girl, a 2007 anthology novel by Lisa Scottoline

== Film ==
- Daddy's Girl (1918 film), starring Baby Marie Osborne
- Daddy's Girl (1996 film), a film starring William Katt
- Daddy's Girl (2001 film), a British short film
- Daddy's Girl (2002 film), a 2002 British television film starring Martin Kemp
- Daddy's Girl, a 2007 documentary directed by Reggie Rock Bythewood
- Daddy's Girl (2018 film), a 2018 horror film starring Jemma Dallender

== Television ==
- Daddy's Girls (1994 TV series), an American sitcom
- Daddy's Girls (2009 TV series), an American reality series on MTV
- "Daddy's Girl", a 1982 episode of The Facts of Life
- "Daddy's Girl", a 1992 episode of Step by Step
- "Daddy's Girl", a 1995 episode of Can't Hurry Love
- "Daddy's Girl", a 1996 episode of ABC Afterschool Special
- "Daddy's Girls", a 2003 episode of L.A. Dragnet
- "Daddy's Girl", a 2004 episode of 8 Simple Rules
- "Daddy's Girl" (Doctors), a 2004 episode
- "Daddy's Girl", a 2004 episode of She Spies
- "Daddy's Girl", a 2004 episode of Tru Calling
- "Daddy's Girl", a 2006 episode of 'Til Death
- "Daddy's Girls", a 2012 episode of Coming Home
- "Daddy's Girl...", a 2012 episode of Don't Trust the B— in Apartment 23
- "Daddy's Girls", a 2012 episode of Say Yes to the Dress: Atlanta

== Music ==
- Daddy's Girl (opera), a 2007 opera by composer Olli Kortekangas and librettist Michael Baran
- "Daddy's Girl", from the 1984 album Medicine Show by The Dream Syndicate
- "Daddy's Girl", from the 1986 album Solitude/Solitaire by Peter Cetera
- "Daddy's Girl", from the 1992 album Metal For Muthas '92 by Crazy Angel
- "Daddy's Girl", from the 1993 album Face the Heat by Scorpions
- "Daddy's Girl", from the 1993 album Pro-Death Ravers by Psychopomps
- "Daddy's Girl", from the 2006 musical Grey Gardens by Scott Frankel
- "Daddy's Girl", from the 2007 album The Luchagors by The Luchagors
- "Daddy's Girl", from the 2007 album The Yearbook by KJ-52

== Other uses ==
- Hibiscus 'Daddy's Girl', a Hibiscus cultivar flower

== See also ==
- It's Okay, Daddy's Girl, South Korean drama television series
- Daddy's Gurl, Philippine television sitcom
- Daddy's Little Girl (disambiguation)
