= Tasmina =

Tasmina is a given name. Notable people with the name include:

- Tasmina Ahmed-Sheikh (born 1970), Scottish politician
- Tasmina Perry, British novelist
