= Mo Effanga =

Fictional TV surgeon

- Holby City character
- First appearance: "Double Bubble"; 22 May 2012
- Last appearance: "Episode 1102"; 29 March 2022
- Created by: Oliver Kent
- Portrayed by: Chizzy Akudolu
- Spinoff(s): Casualty (2017)

In-universe information
- Occupation: Consultant cardiothoracic surgeon; Transplant specialist; (prev. Cardiothoracic surgical registrar)
- Significant other: Derwood Thompson
- Children: Hector Effanga-Thompson (son)
- Relatives: Violet (mother); Clifford George (father); Ina Effanga (aunt); Adele Effanga (cousin); Celia Effanga (cousin)

Maureen "Mo" Effanga is a fictional character from the BBC medical drama Holby City, played by actress Chizzy Akudolu. She first appeared in the fourteenth series episode "Double Bubble", broadcast on 22 May 2012. Mo is a consultant cardiothoracic surgeon and a member of Holby's transplant team. She was introduced along with two other regular characters by the show's then executive producer Johnathan Young, who wanted more "truthful and complicated" characters in the series. When Akudolu read the character breakdown for Mo and learned that she was on the transplant team, she knew she wanted the part because she was passionate about organ donation as her brother has had a kidney transplant. The actress met with a heart consultant to help her prepare for the role.

Mo is portrayed as having a bubbly and warm-hearted persona. Although her personal life is often "disorganised and chaotic", Mo's work life is more structured and she is an excellent doctor. Mo arrived at Holby heavily pregnant and it emerged that she was acting as a surrogate for a friend. Mo's storylines often developed through her close friendship with nurse and transplant co-ordinator Jonny Maconie (Michael Thomson). The character has also been central to a controversial storyline in which she ignored the wishes of a donor's mother. NHS Blood and Transplant revealed that several people had asked to be removed from the donor register as a result of the storyline.

Further exploration of the character's backstory began when her younger sister, Adele Effanga (Petra Letang), was introduced in 2014, followed by the rest of their family the following year. A subsequent storyline saw Mo discover she was adopted. Producers established a friendship between Mo and obstetrician-gynaecologist Derwood "Mr T" Thompson (Ben Hull) throughout 2015, which flourishes when Mr T develops a romantic interest in her. Mo's surrogate son was introduced in late 2015, which created a story where Mo decided to have a child of her own. Akudolu opted to leave her role in 2016 and the character departed in the nineteenth series episode "For the Love of Maureen", broadcast on 13 June 2017. The actress reprised the role in 2018 for a two month guest stint, and later for the series' final episode on 29 March 2022. Akudolu has won and been nominated for several awards for her portrayal of Mo.

== Development ==
=== Creation and characterisation ===
A passionate believer that our bodies are merely on loan to us, Mo is generous, plain-speaking and warm-heated. As a transplant specialist she builds long term relationships with her patients and goes the extra mile to ensure their very best care. She arrives at Holby with ally and best mate, Jonny.

— BBC Online.

On 29 March 2012, it was announced that three new regular characters would make their debuts during Holby City's fourteenth series in May 2012. Actress Chizzy Akudolu joined the cast as Mo Effanga, alongside Catherine Russell as Serena Campbell and Michael Thomson as Mo's best friend Jonny Maconie. The character was created by producer Oliver Kent. Mo joined the show as a Cardiothoracic surgical registrar. Of the new characters, the show's then executive producer, Johnathan Young, commented "These are three very talented actors and I am delighted to welcome them to the cast. There are some dramatic and exciting storylines coming up on Holby City over the next few months and I know our new additions will have an immediate impact." Young later stated that he had wanted to introduce more "truthful and complicated" characters to the series like Mo.

Akudolu's agent gave her the character breakdown for Mo and when she read that Mo was on the transplant team, she knew she had to get the part. She told Katy Moon from Inside Soap that she was passionate about organ donation as her brother had a kidney transplant. To prepare for the role, Akudolu went to a hospital and met with a heart consultant, who showed her how to use the instruments. She was also shown how to stitch by a woman in the show's prosthetics department. Mo's first episode was broadcast on 22 May 2012.

BBC Online describe Mo as having a "disorganised and chaotic" personal life, and a talent for finding disastrous men. Akudolu concurred, saying that while Mo's personal life was a bit of a mystery, she did have a messy home life and she dates men who are not good for her. Akudolu later stated that Mo's work life was "the be-all and end-all for her", it may not be perfect, but it has more structure than her home life. Moon observed that Mo was a "bubbly" person and "warm-hearted". She also commented "If Mo is half as much fun as actress Chizzy Akudolu who plays her, we'll be in for a treat!" Young thought Mo was a brilliant combination of "an excellent doctor but a chaotic person". He added that on occasion Mo makes difficult decisions without thinking them through. Akudolu's co-star Thomson branded Mo "tough" and said she does not like being told she is in the wrong. Akudolu described Mo's style as "more colourful and flamboyant" than her own laid-back look. She revealed that Mo's wardrobe had influenced her to choose more colourful clothes and she hoped to borrow Mo's "vivid-blue Lipsy dress" one day. Akudolu also said that Mo had some "cool pieces" in her wardrobe, including a Ted Baker feather boa and a Mary Portas leather jacket.

=== Friendship with Jonny Maconie ===
"Viewers should also look out for Mo's friendship with Jonny – it's something that's vitally important to them both, and I think it's great having that dynamic in our cast. It's not about romance or a love story, it's two people who have a really close friendship."

— Producer Johnathan Young on Mo and Jonny's friendship. (2012)

Mo was recruited to work at the Holby transplant centre along with her best friend, nurse and transplant co-ordinator Jonny Maconie (Thomson). Shortly after their arrival, Mo and Jonny perform a "domino operation", where they take a donor's heart and lungs and transfer them to two different recipients. When asked how she got to know Thomson, Akudolu told David Collins from TV Choice that she sent Thomson a message on Facebook saying hi, after her suggestion of a weekend away in Paris was turned down by the producers. Akudolu continues by saying that she and Thomson clicked when they met and knew they needed to get their character's relationship right. Thomson revealed that he and Akudolu were close and said there was almost a family quality to their working relationship. He admitted that on occasion they irritated each other, so were either fighting or hugging, which helped with what they were doing on camera.

When Jonny began a relationship with Jac Naylor (Rosie Marcel), Mo felt pushed out, especially because Jonny started lying to her. Mo was upset when Jonny maintained the lie about missing their annual barbecue because he was visiting a relative – when he was actually with Jac. The pair are brought back together again when they save the life of a patient who is a Jehovah's Witness, and refuses to have a transfusion because her religion forbids it. An Inside Soap columnist observed that with Jac around, it would not be long before the "feuding friends" share another spat. When asked how Jac reacted to Mo, Akudolu noted that she was not very welcoming and believed it was because she saw Mo as a threat. Akudolu continued "She's another woman and another surgeon. So as far as she's concerned she doesn't want to get to know Mo. But also because Jonny and I have such a close relationship, she wants in on it, and it makes her vulnerable."

A couple of months later, Jonny and Mo had another falling out and a patient's life was put in danger as a result. Things between the friends were already difficult following Jonny's break up with Jac, but they fought further when Jonny discovered Mo was having an affair with married bartender Albie Cheshire (Andrew Greenough). Thomson explained that while Jonny loved Mo, he could see that the affair would not end well. He was aware that she had a history of being attracted to men who were already in relationships, and had seen her "bounce from one disaster to another." Jonny and Mo's issues impacted on their professional lives when Jonny disobeyed Mo orders that a transplant patient must stay in bed. Jonny allowed the patient to go to the chapel and she collapsed, leading Elliot Hope (Paul Bradley) to realise that there was trouble between Jonny and Mo. Elliot then threatened to remove them from the transplant team.

The following year, Mo and Jonny's friendship was tested when Mo acted unethically with patient Poppy Moss. Mo's career was also placed in jeopardy when Poppy's mother, Nicole (Lizzie Hopley), threatened an investigation. Mo wanted to save her patient Hattie Edison (Sophie Jones), who needed a heart-transplant. When Nicole withdrew her consent for the organ removal, Mo ignored her wishes and went ahead with the procedure to save Hattie. Of Mo's decision, Akudolu explained, "She's not thinking about anyone else's feelings. But Nicole wants her daughter to rest in peace. She thinks Mo and Jonny only cared about Poppy's organs." Mo and Jonny argued about the rules that she had broken, with Jonny telling Mo that she could lose her job. In order to portray Jonny's feelings of anger towards Mo, Thomson and Akudolu did not talk to each other in between filming, allowing the atmosphere on set to become hostile. Jonny and Mo eventually made up. While Nicole gained closure when she met Hattie, and Mo comforted her afterwards. In reality, heart recipients do not come into contact with donor families. Akudolu hoped the audience could see the various points of view and did not want the storyline to put people off becoming donors. She told Katy Moon (Inside Soap), "it's a horrible situation, but Mo just wants to prolong a life in the wake of a sad death."

=== Pregnancy ===
Prior to her first appearance, Moon commented that Mo would have "a big secret" that would keep viewers guessing. When she arrived at Holby, Mo was heavily pregnant. Tara Lo (Jing Lusi) initially assumed that Jonny was the baby's father, but Mo assured her that he was not. She refused to reveal the true identity of the father and Akudolu said it was a secret. Akudolu also commented that the pregnancy would not slow Mo down. The actress told Moon that she loved wearing the prosthetic baby bump on set and that it made her feel broody. Wanting to work until she was ready to give birth, Mo went into premature labour during a shift at the hospital. Initially, Mo thought she was suffering Braxton Hicks contractions, but it soon became clear that the labour was real. Akudolu explained "With Mo if she could, she would have the baby, then go back to work the next day. It's her first child and she knows nothing about childbirth, but she thinks she can just give birth and everything's going to be fine and she'll be back to normal."

The truth about Mo's pregnancy was also revealed when she went into labour. It transpired that Mo was acting as a surrogate for her birthing partner Sorcia Winters (Susannah Corbett), the baby's biological mother. When Sorcia cannot be found, Jac stepped in as Mo's birthing partner. Mo gave birth to a boy and then gave him up to Sorcia. Akudolu compared filming the birth to a workout, saying it was tiring. She spent a day and a half filming the birth and said she looked "rough" because her make-up was not touched up and her hair was a mess. Akudolu thought that the scenes looked real though, since anyone giving birth was not going to look glamorous. Akudolu was offered a tear stick during filming since she had never cried on-screen before; however she turned it down and cried for real as she wanted "to tap into the emotion of the scene." Young said having Sorcia's baby was "a wonderful thing to do", but did not think Mo had thought about the emotional consequences. Akudolu added that following the end of the storyline there would be a new Mo. At the time of her departure, Akudolu named the moment when Mo gave birth her "number one highlight", commenting "Having never given birth on telly or in real life before, I didn't realise how exhausting it would be!"

=== Family ===
Further exploration of Mo's fictional backstory began after her younger sister, Adele (Petra Letang) was introduced to the show in January 2014. Adele is a healthcare assistant assigned to AAU. Mo was not initially aware of Adele's arrival and was surprised when she bumped into her sister in the corridor. Mo was convinced Adele would not last in a serious job, knowing her sister was not a serious girl, and bet Adele would not be strong enough to cut it at Holby. Series producer Simon Harper commented that while Mo loves her sister, she is not exactly delighted at having her work at the same hospital. Harper told Digital Spy's Daniel Kilkelly that Adele's arrival was a "major curveball" for Mo and explained "What's really nice about it is that, on paper, Mo is the sister who's done better and come good – but Adele has a wonderful talent of making them feel like children again. That makes Mo feel slightly undermined, so there's that to watch out for." While Mo was focused enough to become a surgeon, Adele spent her life being "a bit of a drifter". However, Moon observed that both women were cut from the same cloth and Letang agreed, saying that Adele and Mo were both feisty.

When asked about what was coming up for Mo in 2014, Harper replied that Mo would begin to question herself professionally, but assured fans that she was not leaving the show. In May, Mo was hired to give medical advice on a local radio station, after Adele was fired for impersonating her. This caused a feud between the sisters, while Mo let her new celebrity status go to her head. Since the arrival of her sister at the hospital, Mo felt overshadowed by her, so she embraced the chance to gain "some notoriety". Akudolu told Inside Soap's Katy Moon that Mo got caught up in her new job and loved the attention it brought her. Mo's relationship with Adele was further strained when Mo accused her sister of ignoring a patient's symptoms. Akudolu told Moon that Mo was still annoyed with Adele after she impersonated her on the radio and just saw her as "a nuisance". She continued, "Deep down, she wants to be carefree like Adele, but there's not much time for play – she's so serious about her career." Akudolu also expressed her desire to see more of Mo's family on-screen, saying there was "scope for a whole family to show up".

Mo and Adele's mother, Ina (Angela Wynter), and younger sister, Celia (Madra Ihegborow), were introduced in January 2015. Mo and Adele attended Celia's wedding to Max Niven (Robert Mountford), Mo's ex-boyfriend. Akudolu said Mo wanted to get married herself and have a family, so the fact her younger sister was getting married before her was "a bit of a blow". Akudolu continued, "But Mo loves her little sister, so she's not going to try to derail the wedding. If she had her way, she'd break up Celia and Max at some point. Max is a plonker – he's not good enough for either Mo or Celia!" When Mo's father does not turn up for the wedding, everyone assumed he was caring for Grandad Effanga, but it soon emerged that he has gone away with his mistress. Mo tried to cheer her mother up by telling her she was better off without him, but this made her mother angry and she argued with Mo. Ina then revealed a family secret – that she was not Mo's mother, but her aunt – before collapsing from a heart attack. Akudolu commented that while Mo was hurt by her mother's revelation, she immediately "swings into medical mode" to help Ina. Akudolu called the wedding "a lot of fun to film" at the time of her departure.

When Ina was later admitted to Darwin ward, it emerged that the bond she and Mo once shared had been "shattered", leaving them both unsure how to act around each other. After Mo learned that Ina's condition was life-threatening, she realised that she could potentially lose the only person who acted as her mother. Mo then went to make her peace with Ina and decided that she should find her biological father. When Adele contacted Mo's father, Clifford George (Geff Francis), behind her back, the sisters fell out. Adele told Clifford that Mo was his daughter, resulting in him running away from her. Elliot was forced to intervene when Mo and Adele began an argument on the ward. While planning Adele's engagement party, Mo was unaware that Clifford had placed her life in danger, as he struggled to pay his debts to gangsters. They threatened to harm Mo, and junior doctor Arthur Digby (Rob Ostlere) later found a badly beaten woman outside the hospital, who turned out to be Adele.

=== Mr Thompson ===
Harper commented that the chemistry between Mo and obstetrician-gynaecologist Derwood "Mr T" Thompson (Ben Hull) was something that needed resolving in 2014, and that they would be doing something about it one way or another. Akudolu said that she was often asked when Mo and Mr T were going to get together. She and Hull wanted it to happen too, as they get on well. She explained "We have ready made chemistry, and I think Mr T is what Mo needs. He'd look after her – Mo hasn't had that from other guys." The Mo and Mr T pairing became popular with viewers who branded the couple "#MOT" on social media.

Mo brought Mr T to her sister's wedding as her date, and Akudolu hoped they would become a couple soon as she believed they were perfect for each other. She added that Mo and Mr T both liked each other, but various circumstances had been conspiring to keep them apart. Akudolu later said there was "a ready-made relationship just waiting to happen" between Mo and Mr T. Mo's return from a six-week trip to Chicago caused Clifford and Mr T to clash. When Mo introduced them to each other, a protective Clifford was "clearly wary" of Mr T and made several insulting comments about him. Mr T organised a welcome home party for Mo, but when Clifford revealed that he had made alternative plans, Mr T finally snapped. Clifford later suggested that they all celebrate together at Albie's, despite the ongoing tension between them.

The following year, Mo made plans to conceive a child with Mr T acting as her sperm donor. Akudolu thought Mr T would be the perfect father for Mo's baby due to his occupation and "lovely" nature. However, Mr T got "carried away" with his enthusiasm about the potential baby, causing Mo to end the plan. Months later, the pair had sex. Mr T was "gutted" when Mo told him that it would not happen again and he left Holby for Sweden. Akudolu reckoned Mo regretted how her friendship with Mr T ended, but she was not sure if he was the one she should be with. The actress added, "He might not be what she wants but he is what she needs. And then, once he was gone, she finally realised: 'Oh my gosh, he is what I really want'"

=== Reunion with William ===
In October 2015, Mo was reunited with her friend Sorcia and her son, William (Jackson Allison), when they were brought onto the ward following a serious road accident. Mo was forced to perform life-saving surgery on Sorcia's partner, Brett Jones (John Lightbody) who was also badly injured in the accident. When Sorcia suddenly had to be rushed into theatre, she asked Mo to take care of William if anything happened to her. Sorcia died during surgery and Brett was placed in a coma, so Mo was tasked with caring for William. Mo bonded with William and when it came time to hand him back to Brett, Mo struggled to let him go. She decided to run away with him, after learning Brett wanted to hand him over to Sorcia's mother.

Akudolu told Allison Jones of Inside Soap that Mo did not want William to be brought up by a cold woman, who treated Sorcia badly. She also said Mo was not thinking of the consequences of her actions. Mo took William to the local bus station, leaving Adele and Mr T to try and talk her into handing him back. Akudolu said Mo just wanted more time with William. She explained, "In Mo's head, William is her little man, and having him around has changed her life. She's bonded with him, and her heart always rules her head. She just wants to get as far away as possible and have some proper thinking space." Off-screen, Akudolu bonded well with Allison and enjoyed working with him during the storyline.

=== Departure ===
"It feels good, to be honest with you. I've left on such a high, so I don't feel sad. I miss Holby and I miss the people a lot, but I'm excited for the future."

— Chizzy Akudolu on her feelings after finishing filming. (2017)

During a May 2017 interview with Sophie Dainty of Digital Spy, actor Lee Mead, who plays Lofty Chiltern, revealed Akudolu had filmed her last appearance and would be departing Holby City. Akudolu told Laura-Jayne Tyler of Inside Soap that she began considering quitting the role in late 2015 and informed Harper of her decision eight months later. The actress explained that upon telling Harper, she was hysterical and began crying. She confirmed that producers had left the door open for a potential return, suggesting that she could return for "a bunch of episodes". Akudolu's decision to quit her role led to Hull being written out from the series. Akudolu informed Hull of her departure and warned him that Mr T could depart with Mo, which he "totally understood". The cast and crew held a leaving party for Akudolu and Hull, which the actress believed was "a great way to end five years."

Mo made her last appearance during the episode broadcast on 13 June. Mo is offered a job in London and plans to leave alone with Hector, her son with Mr T. However, at the last minute, Mo questions why she is leaving "this wonderful man" and gives him a speech about her love for him. Mo reunites with Mr T and they leave together. Akudolu believed that the audience would be pleased with their exit. Following the airing of the departure, Akudolu and Hull did a Facebook live stream event for fans to ask questions.

=== Returns ===
On 14 August 2018, Akudolu announced that she would be reprising her role and returning to Holby City for a two month guest stint. Of her return, she stated, "It's only for two months. I love the show and going back was so like coming home, like putting on your duvet – you just know you are home. But I know that I have to do other stuff. We are nomads, actors. I'm really honoured to go back in." Mo returns alongside Guy Self (John Michie) in the twentieth series episode "One of Us", broadcast on 20 November 2018. Mo and Guy are called back to Holby City Hospital to help save Jac's life. Mo then stays around to run the Darwin ward, and Akudolu commented that Mo's leadership style would lead to "some fun".

Holby City was cancelled in June 2021 after 23 years on air. Producers invited multiple former cast members to reprise their roles during the show's final series. On 16 March 2022, it was announced that Akudolu had reprised her role as Mo for the show's final episode, which first airs on 29 March 2022.

== Reception ==
=== Accolades ===
For her portrayal of Mo, Akudolu won Best Actress in the TV category at the 2012 BEFFTA Awards. She was also nominated for Best Newcomer at the 2012 Black International Film Festival Music Video & Screen Awards, and in the Emerging Talent and Young Shooting Star category at the Screen Nation Film & Television Awards. In 2013, Akudolu was nominated for Best Actress at the BEFFTA Awards. She was also included on the longlist for Best Newcomer at the 18th National Television Awards. In 2017, Akudolu was included on the longlist for Best Drama Star at the Inside Soap Awards, while Mo's relationship with Mr T featured on the longlist for Best Drama Storyline. Neither nomination progressed to the viewer-voted shortlist.

=== Critical response ===
A reporter for the Daily Mirror observed that Mo was "desperate to get back to normal life" after giving birth and thought it might be too soon. The Daily Mirror's Jane Simon thought Jonny's attempt to play cupid for Mo was not very good, commenting that it would be "very hard for Mo to see Mr T in a romantic light" since he delivered her baby. A writer for the Daily Post stated that with Jac away, it was Mo's turn "to wow us" with her cardio skills. The writer also commented that it would not look good if Mo was unable to save a woman's only surviving child and added "when a donor heart becomes available, standard procedure goes out the window. National Transplant Week was just a fortnight ago, so you can bet the people at the NHS Organ Donor Register will be appalled by Mo's actions."

The Daily Post writer's prediction came true when the show was accused of scaring off organ donors, following the storyline in which a mother withdrew her consent for her daughter's heart to be donated, only for the operation to go ahead. NHS Blood and Transplant revealed that several people had asked to be removed from the donor register as a result of the storyline, which they branded "misleading" and "wholly inaccurate". NHS Blood and Transplant said the storyline made organ donation out to be "a callous utilitarian process in which donors are commodified". While the BBC apologised for the storyline, they added that Mo would face the consequences of her actions in the future. Katy Moon of Inside Soap observed, "Iron-willed Mo Effanga looks set to steal Jac Naylor's crown as the most despised member of staff at Holby!"

A Chester Chronicle reporter said that Jonny could "count on Mo to interfere" during his problems with Jac. Jamie Downham from Yahoo! TV UK & Ireland placed Mo's reaction to her kiss with Sacha Levy (Bob Barrett) at number seven on his list of the funniest moments from Holby City, commenting "Not exactly what you want to see when you've just smooched someone, Mo's horrified face looks like she's accidentally got off with a rottweiler." A Daily Mirror reporter called Mo "formidable". A writer from We Love TV said "transplant specialist Mo Effanga may be great at her job on the wards, but her personal life is a right mess."

Jane Simon observed that the wedding episode "really laid on the angst for poor Mo Effanga, didn't it?" After Mo learned her mother was actually her aunt, Simon commented, "In all her time on this earth had Mo never once needed to produce her birth certificate, which would have told her the same thing?" Inside Soap journalists were disappointed when they discovered Mo and Mr T were departing, with Laura-Jayne Tyler adding, "We feel as if we've been on a real journey with their romance".
