= Jonny Maconie =

- Holby City character
- Michael Thomson as Jonny Maconie
- First appearance: "Wolf's Clothing"; 15 May 2012
- Last appearance: "Spriral Staircases"; 23 June 2015
- Portrayed by: Michael Thomson

In-universe information
- Occupation: Clinical nurse manager Transplant coordinator
- Family: Alistair Maconie (brother)
- Spouse: Stacey Clarkson (2019−)
- Significant others: Jac Naylor; Bonnie Wallis
- Children: Emma Naylor-Maconie

Jonny Maconie is a fictional character from the BBC medical drama Holby City, played by actor Michael Thomson. He first appeared in the fourteenth series episode "Wolf's Clothing", broadcast on 15 May 2012. Jonny is a clinical nurse manager and Holby City Hospital's transplant coordinator. He was introduced along with two other regular cast members by the show's then executive producer Johnathan Young, who wanted more "truthful and complicated" characters in the series. Thomson attended two auditions, before he learned that he had won the part of Jonny. To help him prepare for the role, Thomson went on a tour of a real-life hospital with a heart surgeon. Thomson confirmed his departure from the show in April 2015 and Jonny made his screen exit on 14 April. He returned for a guest appearance on 23 June.

Jonny is portrayed as being funny and "a bit of a lad". He also has a confident and charming persona. Thomson liked playing Jonny because he was a good guy, who was flawed. He also praised the writers for way his character was written, while Katy Moon from Inside Soap was convinced that Jonny would become popular with viewers. Jonny's storylines have often developed through his close friendship with Mo Effanga (Chizzy Akudolu) and his on-off relationship with Jac Naylor (Rosie Marcel). Jonny later became a father when Jac gave birth to their daughter Emma, he was engaged to fellow nurse Bonnie Wallis (Carlyss Peer) until her death on their wedding day and was sent to prison after being accused of causing a patient's death. Jonny later reunited with Jac and they left Holby together.

== Development ==
=== Creation and casting ===
Charismatic, cocky and roughish, Jonny has no qualms about telling a few white lies to stir up some mischief, but he'll never compromise patient care and has a long-standing professional relationship with best mate, Mo.

— BBC Online.

On 29 March 2012, it was announced that three new regular characters would make their debuts during Holby City's fourteenth series in May 2012. Actor Michael Thomson joined the cast as Jonny Maconie, alongside Catherine Russell as Serena Campbell and Chizzy Akudolu as Jonny's best friend Mo Effanga. Jonny was introduced to the show as a nurse and transplant coordinator. Of the new characters, the show's then executive producer, Johnathan Young, commented "These are three very talented actors and I am delighted to welcome them to the cast. There are some dramatic and exciting storylines coming up on Holby City over the next few months and I know our new additions will have an immediate impact." Consultant series producer Justin Young later stated that he had wanted to introduce more "truthful and complicated" characters to the series like Jonny and Mo.

Thomson told David Collins from TV Choice that his first audition was "troublingly easy", and following a second audition, his agent called to tell him he had won the part. Thomson was surprised and initially in disbelief that he had been successful. To prepare for the role, Thomson went on a tour of a hospital with a heart surgeon. He commented, "I went to meetings about the best course of treatment for someone who needed a new organ. It was fascinating. There's also a massive amount of politics, which is why a show like Holby City is endlessly fascinating because there are so many layers. There's such a fluctuation of power." Holby City was Thomson's first television role. The actor expected to get fired within the first six months because he initially struggled to hit his marks and get his lines right. He thought the producers had made a mistake in casting him.

=== Characterisation ===
Thomson described Jonny as "a bit of a lad", "funny", "naughty" and confident. He also said Jonny was good at his job and cared about his patients. While Thomson was not aware whether Jonny had "left a trail of broken hearts", he did say that Jonny understood women because he had sisters and his best friend was a woman. Thomson stated that he did not think he and Jonny shared many similarities. He later told Lorraine Kelly that he loved playing Jonny because even though he was a good guy, he was also flawed and could be "an idiot" at times. The actor was pleased at how the writers had written his character and wished Jonny was real. Kelly believed Jonny would be a good friend, but often wondered what was going on in his mind in regards to some of decisions. Katy Moon from Inside Soap observed that Jonny was "charming, mischievous and roguish". She also thought that Jonny lived up to Young's promise to introduce "a charismatic male nurse" and was convinced that Jonny would become popular with viewers.

=== Friendship with Mo Effanga ===
Jonny was recruited to work at Holby along with his best friend, Mo Effanga (Akudolu). Shortly after their arrival, Mo and Jonny perform a "domino operation", which involves transferring a donor's heart and lungs to two different recipients. Akudolu said she and Thomson clicked straight away when they met and they worked on getting their character's relationship right. Thomson revealed that he and Akudolu were close and said there was almost a family quality to their working relationship. He admitted that on occasion they did irritate each other, so were either fighting or hugging, which also helped with developing their characters' relationship. When Jonny began a relationship with Jac Naylor (Rosie Marcel), he started lying to Mo and she felt pushed out. Mo was upset when Jonny continued to lie about missing their annual barbecue because he was visiting a relative – when he was actually with Jac. The pair were reunited when they saved the life of a patient who was a Jehovah's Witness, and refused to have a transfusion because the Bible forbids the use of blood.

An Inside Soap columnist observed that it would not be long before the "feuding friends" shared another spat, especially with Jac around. Akudolu believed Jac was jealous of Mo and Jonny's close relationship and that she wanted to share it. A couple of months later, Jonny and Mo had another falling out and a patient's life was placed in danger as a result. There was already tension between them following Jonny's break-up with Jac, but they had another fight when Jonny discovered Mo was having an affair with a married man. Thomson explained that while Jonny loved Mo, he could see that the affair would not end well and had seen his friend "bounce from one disaster to another". Jonny and Mo's personal issues impacted on their professional lives when Jonny disobeyed Mo's orders regarding a transplant patient. Jonny allowed the patient to leave her bed to go to the chapel and she then collapsed. Elliot Hope (Paul Bradley) threatened to remove Jonny and Mo from the transplant team, after realising there was trouble between them.

=== Relationship with Jac Naylor and fatherhood ===
"Jonny seems to be doing a pretty good job of standing up to Jac, which many people wouldn't be brave enough to do! I think it remains to be seen whether he's really going to be able to tame her. I'm not sure if anyone can tame Jac, and it's also a question of whether Jac can really trust anyone."

— Producer Justin Young on Jac and Jonny's relationship. (2012)

While he was attending a people skills course, Jonny met Holby's Jac Naylor and lied that he was a neurosurgeon. They had a one-night stand and Jac had no idea Jonny was really a nurse and about to start working at Holby. When Jonny was introduced to Jac as part of the new transplant team, Thomson called Jac's reaction "hilarious". He continued "it's incredibly awkward for Jac – not for Jonny because he doesn't care. In fact I think he says to her 'Have we met?' so that drives Jac completely crazy and creates all kinds of tension!" Thomson said Jonny was the "Kryptonite to Jac's super ice maiden" and believed his character was not intimidated by her at all. Thomson also said that he had never moved as quickly as Jonny did and called Jonny and Jac's relationship "fiery". The actor later stated that he wanted to make Jac and Jonny's relationship interesting to watch and was pleased that the couple had become popular with viewers.

Thomson noted that Jac had messed with Jonny's head, while all he wanted to do was fix her. He also joked that his mother did not approve of Jac and wanted Jonny to be with Mo. Jonny was surprised when Jac declared her love for him and Thomson called it "an enormous moment" for the couple. Speaking to a What's on TV reporter, Thomson said "Up til now, Jac's had him jumping through hoops, but by her saying those words and making that commitment, it blows Jonny's mind and takes their relationship in a new direction." While treating a patient, Jac suffered a sharp pain in her side and Jonny assumed that it was something to do with her kidney, which she had removed. Jac assured him it was nothing, but secretly had urine tests done. Thomson thought it was not unusual for Jac to hide something from Jonny, because she had built up many defences over the years when she felt scared. Jac later learned that she had endometriosis, which could prevent her from having children. Thomson believed that Jac was afraid to tell Jonny as she knew he wanted a big family, and he might have second thoughts about their relationship.

Jac later became pregnant with Jonny's baby, but the couple broke up and Jonny began dating fellow nurse Bonnie Wallis (Carlyss Peer). Jac also considered having an abortion after learning the baby had a congenital diaphragmatic hernia, leaving it with just a 50% chance of survival. Jac went into labour a week early and Thomson told Inside Soap's Katy Moon that Jonny felt that if the baby was ready to come out, Jac would just have to face that. Thomson did some research before filming the birth scenes, in particular he viewed One Born Every Minute. He also said Jonny was dealing with a lot of uncertainty, as the baby's condition led to "an unpredictable set of circumstances" at the happiest time of his life. Jac allowed Jonny to be her birthing partner and Marcel commented that by the time Jac has given birth, she hates Jonny. Thomson added that Jac and Jonny would forever be united by their daughter, but was not sure if they would ever get back together.

=== Relationship with Bonnie Wallis ===
Jonny later began dating nurse Bonnie (Peer). Of their relationship, Thomson said "Romantically, Bonnie is the textbook answer to Jonny." Peer wanted to believe that Jonny loved Bonnie, but knew that Jac would always have a place in Jonny's life because of Emma. However, Bonnie also knew Jonny did not want to spend the rest of his life with Jac and she was "determined" not to let him go. Jonny eventually proposed to Bonnie and Peer thought it seemed like the wedding came around quickly, but said that the couple had known each other for a long time. She added that marriage would be good for Bonnie and Jonny, as it would give them security. On the day of the wedding, Jac tried to stop Jonny from getting to the registry office. Thomson said Jonny spent the episode caught in between the past with Jac and his future with Bonnie. When Jonny finally made it to the registry office, he asked Bonnie for some money to pay the taxi driver. Bonnie crossed the road without looking and was hit by a truck. Jonny was "left devastated" when he realised that there was nothing that could be done to save Bonnie. Of the scene, Thomson quipped "Finally, Jonny had someone who could make him happy but then, in true Holby fashion, it's ripped away from him." He added that he was equally devastated at Peer's departure as Jonny was at Bonnie's death.

=== Departure ===
In April 2015, it was confirmed that Thomson had left Holby City. Of leaving the show, Thomson stated "I've loved every second of my time on Holby but, as an actor, I want to try new roles and don't ever want to get too comfortable. I've really enjoyed playing Jonny and I'll remember him fondly – but I don't think even he could handle any more devastation in his life!" Jonny left with Jac and their daughter Emma. Thomson explained that Jonny was ready for a new journey, after going through so much with Jac, Bonnie and his imprisonment. Before he leaves, Jonny confronted Guy Self (John Michie), as he blamed him for everything that had happened to him. Thomson later described the exit storyline with Guy as "the most high stakes" it had ever been for his character. Jonny departed on 7 April 2015, but made a guest appearance on 23 June 2015. In October 2015, it was mentioned that Jonny and Jac had broken up. Producer Simon Harper confirmed the off-screen split was "perfectly amiable" and that they were co-parenting Emma.

== Reception ==
Jamie Downham from Yahoo! TV branded Jonny "the Scottie hottie". He also thought Jonny had the patience of a saint and was always "relentlessly upbeat". The Western Mail's Rachel Mainwaring observed "Jonny and Jac are completely mismatched". While a Sunday Mirror reporter thought Jonny was "braver than he looks" when he messed with Mo, and when he then spent the weekend with Jac, the reporter called him "a glutton for punishment". A reporter for the Daily Record quipped, "After the grief that Jonny gave Jac when she opted to perform surgery instead of attending her own daughter's christening, you'd think Jonny would know better than to be scrubbing up just a few hours before he's supposed to be marrying Bonnie – even if the patient is somebody very special."
