= Jac Naylor =

Fictional character from Holby City

- Holby City character
- First appearance: "Bird on a Wire"; 22 November 2005
- Last appearance: "Episode 1102"; 29 March 2022
- Created by: Richard Stokes
- Portrayed by: Rosie Marcel
- Spinoff(s): HolbyBlue (2008); Casualty (2016, 2018, 2019)

In-universe information
- Occupation: Surgical registrar; Cardiothoracic registrar; Locum consultant general surgeon; Clinical lead, Darwin; Consultant cardiothoracic surgeon; Director of improvement
- Significant others: Joseph Byrne; Lord Byrne; Nick Jordan; Oliver Valentine; Sean Dolan; Jonny Maconie; Guy Self; Matteo Rossini; Adrian "Fletch" Fletcher; Kian Madani
- Children: Emma Naylor-Maconie
- Relatives: Paula Burrows (mother); Jasmine Burrows (half-sister); Henry Burrows (grandfather)

Jac Naylor is a fictional character born in Scawsby from the BBC medical drama Holby City, portrayed by Rosie Marcel. She made her first screen appearance during the series eight episode "Bird on a Wire", which was originally broadcast on 22 November 2005. The character is introduced alongside Luke Roberts and Tom Chambers as Joseph Byrne and Sam Strachan, respectively. Jac is characterised as a highly ambitious, forthright surgeon who is career-oriented. Her backstory states that her mother placed her in foster care aged twelve. She is also well known for her close in-show relationship with her brother Ash Naylor.

Marcel took maternity leave in 2014 and Jac temporarily departs in the seventeenth series episode "Go the Distance", originally broadcast on 14 April 2015, after reuniting with Jonny Maconie (Michael Thomson). Marcel returns for two appearances during her maternity leave, before returning in the eighteenth series episode "A Delicate Truth", originally broadcast on 24 November 2015. Marcel worked with producers to emphasise Jac's bitchy characterisation on her return. After noticing a connection between Marcel and Alex Walkinshaw, Jac was paired with his character, director of nursing Adrian "Fletch" Fletcher, in 2017. Jac was written out in series 22 but made an unannounced return in the following series. Her departure was originally advertised as permanent but Marcel later claimed it was a publicity stunt. In 2021, the BBC cancelled Holby City and producers decided to end the series with Jac's death. They created a terminal brain tumour storyline and portrayed Jac determined to find a cure. Producer Ben Wadey has stated he believed Jac's death was the show's end and thought a miracle cure would have been unrealistic. Jac's death and final scenes occur in the final episode of Holby City, which was broadcast on 29 March 2022. Additionally, Jac has made multiple appearances on Holby City's sister shows, HolbyBlue and Casualty.

== Development ==
=== Casting and introduction ===
Prior to her casting, Marcel had appeared in Holby City in an unrelated role, as a drug addict named Elinor. After joining the main cast of Holby City as Jac, Marcel signed a three-year contract with the drama, securing her on the show until 2008. Marcel was introduced to the series alongside Luke Roberts and Tom Chambers, who portray cardiothoracic registrars Joseph Byrne and Sam Strachan, respectively. Jac is introduced during the episode titled "Bird on a Wire", which was broadcast on 22 November 2005. A writer from Inside Soap reported that Jac arrives at the hospital determined to impress consultant Ric Griffin (Hugh Quarshie). She offers to help on a double amputation procedure and insists that Ric will be so impressed he will offer her a permanent role at Holby. Medical trainee Dean West (Paul Henshall) accidentally cuts Ric's hand and this puts him in a bad mood. Jac has to work harder to impress Ric as he insists he no longer needs her help. Following the broadcast of her introductory scenes, Jac returns in January 2006 determined to secure a full-time Surgical Registrar post. In two series twelve episodes, Cydney Dubavin-Hands played a teenage Jac in flashback scenes.

Writers soon developed a rivalry between Jac and fellow registrar Diane Lloyd (Patricia Potter). The story sees the pair fight for the role of locum consultant, which Diane goes onto secure. A writer from the Liverpool Echo stated that Jac took credit for work Diane had done. They added "Diane and Jac's working relationship hasn't exactly been an easy one to date, and it doesn't look as if it's going to improve". The pair later argue over patient care. When a paroled murderer is admitted to Darwin ward, they disagree on the cause of his pain. Jac decides to take over the case and orders x-rays to confirm her diagnosis. She goes to see consultant Dan Clifford (Peter Wingfield) and complains about having to work alongside Diane. He sides with Diane and throws Jac's diagnosis in the bin. When Diane realises that Jac was correct about the man's condition she is forced to apologise.

=== Characterisation ===
According to the official Holby City website, Jac is "strong-minded" and forthright. Professionally, she is a highly ambitious "political player", determined to become a consultant and attain recognition for her surgical skills. She is willing to hurt others to achieve her goals, and has a "professional façade", developed as a result of pursuing a career in a male-dominated field. A BBC Online reporter thought that Jac's "determination to be brilliant might just kill her". Jac demonstrates a willingness to flout rules and endanger patients to advance her own career. Marcel liked Jac's original characterisation of a woman "who would gladly sell her soul to the devil in exchange for a better job". Bob Barrett, who portrays Sacha Levy in the drama, dubbed the character "Ms Darwin" after she is promoted to clinical lead of cardiothoracic ward, Darwin. Outside of work, Jac is "charming and hugely sociable". Placed in foster care by her mother aged twelve, she finds it difficult to form relationships due to an inability to commit and "let herself go". Her experience in foster care made Jac more independent as she believes that she cannot rely on other people. Marcel explained that Jac believes that "no one is ever going to fight for you so you just need to crack on and do it yourself and just get on with it basically!" Barrett was inspired by the exploration of Jac's characterisation and backstory when exploring his own character.

Shortly after joining the cast, producers spoke to Marcel about turning the character of Jac into "a massive bitch", which excited her. The actress explained in June 2018 that Jac's nastier personality combined with the stories written for is the reason she has remained on Holby City. In 2008, Jac had firmly been established as a "rude" and "bitchy" character. Marcel told an Inside Soap reporter that "she's too honest for my liking. There's a fine line between being honest and rude. I'd want to hit her over the head!" Scriptwriter Patrick Homes found it easy to write stories for Jac due to her "defined" characterisation. Marcel reflected on her character's characterisation in 2015, stating that she enjoys how Jac "says the things that people wouldn't normally say, or would at least think about first". Three years later, the actress opined that Jac is more gentle than she was upon her introduction. She hoped that the character would toughen up, but expected her to experience some painful stories first.

Though Jac rarely falls in love, she is not averse to using sexual manipulation to achieve her goals, for example she has had romances with several of her colleagues; consultant Nick Jordan (Michael French), who she let "too close and was burned", and foundation doctor Oliver Valentine (James Anderson). Noting this trait, television critic Jim Shelley described Jac as a "man-eating android".

In 2011, writers planned to rejuvenate Jac's nasty persona. Producers created a medical story which leaves Jac conflicted in the face of treating an infant patient. When Jac is introduced to baby Freya who requires heart surgery, she behaves in her usual nasty manner. When Freya's mother abandons her, Jac bonds with the baby. Marcel told Katy Moon from Inside Soap that Jac relates to Freya because her mother also abandoned her. Jac operates on Freya and she nearly dies during the procedure. She said that "Jac's becoming attached" and when Jac saves her life "that's when the real bond develops". Marcel explained that Freya "has a big impact" on Jac and it was the start of a long-running story in which her character changes.

In 2019, Marcel assessed that Jac is still mean but also does "so much good for people" via her job. She explained that Jac has had a "hard life and come out the other side." She added that Jac is a fighter because she carries on through the bad and wanted viewers to be inspired by Jac's driven persona. She later noted that Jac is "a little bit of what we all want to be – a bit more honest and more open".

=== Relationship with Joseph Byrne ===
"I think of their relationship as being like a gladiator-style, eternal struggle. It's a force that has defined them. They had a tumultuous relationship, very passionate, despite Joseph's rather 'stiff' approach to things. So they had a great passion, a degree of violence and just a real, deep-seated love. For each other, they are the 'one that got away'."

— Roberts on Jac and Joseph's eternal love. (2019)

Producers paired Jac with fellow registrar Joseph. Jac originally only slept with Joseph in a bid to further her career. She had previously been involved in an affair with Joseph's father Lord Byrne (Ronald Pickup). He later moves on with ward sister Faye Morton (Patsy Kensit), which causes a feud. Jac and Joseph later sleep together and tricks Joseph into believing that she is pregnant with his child. When Faye discovers the truth she breaks-up with him. Kensit said that "he's done the most unforgivable thing". Joseph manages to convince Faye to marry him, but she soon takes a romantic interest in Linden Cullen (Duncan Pow). Jac continues to interfere in Joseph's relationship, becoming wary of Faye and Linden and Kensit stated that Jac had the right to be suspicious.

Jac and Joseph briefly reunited prior to Roberts' departure from the series. Marcel told Inside Soap's Moon that "Jac will always love Joseph." When Roberts left he made Marcel a promise that he would return to the show if she ever chose to leave, so that Jac and Joseph could leave together. Marcel later assessed that Jac gave up on a ready made family with Joseph and Harry. Roberts told Victoria Wilson from What's on TV that Jac and Joseph's relationship was "tumultuous" and "very passionate" despite Joseph's treatment of Jac. He concluded that Jac and Joseph class each other as the "one that got away".

In 2019, Roberts returned to the show for one episode as Joseph. Marcel was surprised that Roberts agreed to return having previously stating that he would only return amid a departure for Jac. Marcel told Laura Jayne-Tyler from Inside Soap that even after ten years, Joseph is still "the love of her life". This is because they parted on good terms and Jac has constantly compared subsequent partners with Joseph. He returns with Faye and Marcel believed that Jac seeing them together again "is one of the most difficult things she has ever had to do." Joseph is at the hospital to support Faye through a heart transplant. Roberts stated that Joseph's heart has always belonged to Jac. He described it as "an eternal love that will never go away." So Joseph is on a "rescue mission" to save Faye, but ultimately "Jac's magnetic pull hasn't weakened" and they end up revisiting old feelings. He later told Sophie Dainty from Digital Spy that "he's so drawn to her – he is almost looking for an excuse. Otherwise, why is he there? He's nervous and it's a collection of emotions. He doesn't know what to do with it."

=== Assault and murder investigation ===
In September 2007, writers made Jac the victim of an attempted sexual assault. In the episode titled "Friends Reunited", Alan Clooney (James Weber Brown) is admitted to the Darwin ward following a car accident. He is instantly attracted to Jac and enjoys receiving medical attention from her. Marcel told Katy Moon from Inside Soap that Jac only gives Alan "professional attention" but he "gets the wrong idea". Jac is preoccupied with another patient Graham Fenton (Ben Jones), whom she recognises from her school days. This aggravates Alan and makes him jealous. When Graham reveals that he now works for a US pharmaceutical company, she forges a romantic interest in him. Marcel explained that Jac used to bully Graham for being overweight and suffering from acne. He is now good looking and successful, and "in Jac's mind, the fact that he works for a pharmaceutical company in America also represents an opportunity for her to further her career." Graham is fooling Jac to enact revenge for the bullying ordeal she inflicted on him. When she meets with him for a date, he kisses her and reveals he is married with children. Marcel said that Graham "just wanted to embarrass her" in public.

Alan witnesses the incident and takes an opportunity to goad Jac. He speaks to her "menacingly" and attacks her until she loses consciousness, then drags her into bushes. Unbeknownst to Jac, registrar Lola Griffin (Sharon D. Clarke) had been watching Alan around Jac and suspected he was a rapist. Lola telephones Jac when she notices Jac and Alan are both missing from the ward. The ring tone rouses Jac into consciousness and she tries to fight of Alan. He tries to sexually assault her but Lola arrives in time and hits Alan with a metal bar. The attack leaves Jac at her "lowest ebb" and Marcel said that her character "is sickened" with Lola because she knew Alan posed a serious threat.

In March 2008, Alan is reintroduced into the show and is later found stabbed to death. This story crossed over into the show's sister series HolbyBlue. The episode focuses on the murder investigation and police interviews conducted with Holby City characters. Jac is arrested on suspicion of murder, having earlier threatened to kill Alan in-front of her colleagues. Marcel told an Inside Soap reporter that Jac "finds it hard" because the evidence suggests she killed him, adding that "she has no credible alibi and her fingerprints are on the murder weapon."

Jac pleads her innocence when she is presented with the evidence. The actress sympathised with Jac because "she fully believes in her abilities as a surgeon and wouldn't jeopardise that." When the police interview Joseph, he does not defend Jac and claims that she is capable of murder. Marcel said that Jac should be shocked by Joseph's statement but "she has a history with him, so he probably believes that she's capable of anything." Marcel told a BBC Online reporter that fans would "love the storyline" because it features "Jac getting her just desserts [sic]". She concluded that "you get to see another side to Jac in this episode – a side that she never shows in Holby City – so that should be really interesting to fans of the show." Marcel had a "fantastic time" working on the HolbyBlue set and liked how different the set worked in comparison to the Holby City one.

=== Feud with Faye Morton ===
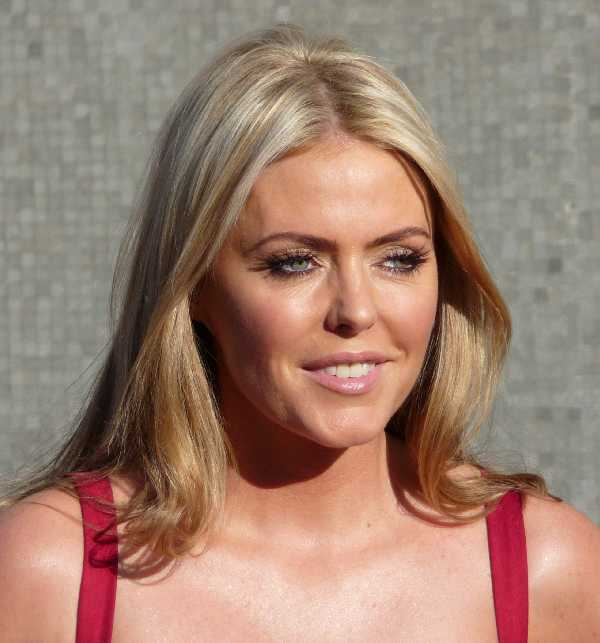
A feud between Jac and Faye (portrayed by Patsy Kensit, pictured) was established.

Writers developed a feud with ward sister Faye which has dramatic consequences for Jac. She is jealous that Faye has begun a relationship with Joseph. Maeve Quigley from Daily Mirror observed that Faye had become Jac's enemy by February 2008, adding that her "main hobby is scoring points off Faye." When Faye takes time off work for a dentist appointment, Jac becomes suspicious. Faye is actually attending the police exhumation of her ex-husband's dead body. Jac realises that Faye has lied about her whereabouts when she witnesses her with the police. Jac visits vicar Kevin Mathers (Paul Opacic) who reveals that he "can see the good" in her. This prompts Jac to hatch a scheme and creates a new friendly persona. She soon covers for Faye to keep her secret hidden and takes the blame for a small fire ward sister Kyla Tyson (Rakie Ayola) causes.

Jac carries on pretending to be Faye's friend for months until a culmination to the plot aired in June 2008. Faye's stepson Carl Hewson (Fergus O'Donnell) arrives at the hospital demanding money to pay off loan sharks. He blackmails Faye and Jac spots an opportunity to sabotage things. Marcel told Moon that "Jac appears to help Faye out – but being the 'nice' person she is, Jac's looking to trip her up." She convinces Joseph and Faye to not give Carl more money, which results in the loan sharks attacking Carl. He is taken to an operating theatre where Jac fails to save his life. Marcel explained that both Joseph and Faye hold Jac responsible for Carl's death. This makes Jac more determined to expose Faye as a liar. Marcel said that Jac still loves Joseph and wants him back because "in her eyes Faye has stolen him from her." Jac becomes suspicious of secretive Faye as she gets into a taxi. Jac follows the vehicle on her motorcycle and tracks Faye down to a nursing home. Faye's secret son is being cared for in the home and Jac cannot wait to tell Joseph the truth.

Marcel said that Jac is determined to expose Faye and speeds off on her motorbike. Jac's recklessness has severe consequences when she crashes and is hurled from her motorbike. Off-screen Marcel believed that motorbikes are unsafe. She used to ride them but ceased after she had accidents and some of her friends died in separate motorbike crashes. This meant that the scenes required a stunt double to portray the crash scenes. To add realism, Marcel was attached to the back of a moving lorry and filmed to give the impression of her riding the motorbike. Marcel explained that after the stunt double had finished their role, "it's my crumpled body lying on the ground at the end of the episode." The actress concluded that Jac is taken to hospital and it is "touch-and-go whether she'll pull through".

Joseph and Faye separate following her affair with Linden. This leaves Jac and Joseph free to rekindle their romance. Faye gives birth to his child Harry, while detained in a mental health facility. The events force Joseph to break-up with Jac. But when Faye refuses to associate with Joseph, he apologises to Jac and they get back together.

Kensit and Roberts reprised their roles for a single episode in 2019 to coincide with the show's twentieth anniversary. Writers used the unresolved tension between the characters to develop "a playfulness and a real strength and humour" in their portrayal. Kensit observed that the "bitchiness" between the characters is "heightened" in Faye's return, which she liked as she felt it added to the episode. Faye returns in need of a heart transplant and has to be admitted to Holby City Hospital when a rainstorm hits. Kensit said that Faye wants to avoid Jac and the hospital, but it becomes "the only option". On the moment Jac sees Faye again, Marcel commented, "Jac's feisty spirit certainly comes tumbling out!" The pair do not want Jac to perform surgery on Faye, but understand that she is the best in her field, which would give Faye the best chance of survival. When Joseph returns, it emerges that he and Faye are back together. He asks Jac to perform the operation and she agrees. Roberts told Wilson (What's on TV) that Joseph and Jac have "enormous underlying respect for each other as professionals", which means he can recognise her excellence. Marcel explained that Jac feels that she has to agree because Joseph asks. She added that Jac now "can hold that over Faye for a very long time".

=== Friendship with Sacha Levy ===
Then-script editor Simon Harper suggested pairing Jac with registrar Sacha Levy (Bob Barrett) following his introduction as the characters have contrasting personalities. On the actors' first day working together, they filmed two more scenes than planned as they were working so quickly. The characters remained paired together for six months. Barrett thought the characters were friends because with Jac, Sacha can "[see] straight through what everyone else struggles with" and understands that Jac has "the greatest heart". Likewise, with Sacha, Jac speaks to him in a different manner to everyone else, and together, they trust each other a lot. Marcel believed that Jac and Sacha should be romantically involved because "they are like yin and yang". She added that it was "a shame" Sacha loved ward sister Chrissie Williams (Tina Hobley) instead. The actress later spoke again of her wish for the pair to be together. She said that they would "make such a hilarious couple" but did not think it would ever happen. Sacha and Chrissie later prepare to marry, but Jac notices that Chrissie is having second thoughts. She warns Chrissie not to hurt Sacha and Hobley explained that Jac believes "if anyone deserves to be happy more than anyone she's ever met, it's Sacha".

Marcel and Barrett formed an idea that Jac and Sacha should live together in an unseen flat with viewers only seeing the characters speaking about home life. In 2018, Sacha is featured in an issue-led story about depression and male mental health. Jac becomes involved in Sacha's rehabilitation process after he tries to kill himself. Barrett dubbed Jac "Sacha's guardian angel" and she is saddened to hear about his battle, but is also "furious" that he did not speak to her or his former partner, Essie Harrison (Kaye Wragg). Jac then comforts Sacha and tells him that he will move into her home. Barrett explained that this would aid Sacha's recovery, but not complete it. In a 2019 story, Jac has to perform emergency surgery on Sacha, but has to fight for theatre space against Connie. Marcel explained that Jac "would have fought to the death for Sacha".

=== Feud with Sahira Shah ===
In 2011, producers introduced actress Laila Rouass as registrar Sahira Shah and another sparring partner for Jac. Writers pitted the characters against each other via a story where they compete for the same consultancy role. Sahira is portrayed as a talented and able surgeon who rivals Jac. Marcel explained that Jac's professional feuds had traditionally been against male characters, but Jac now had to face a female who "has it all". Sahira has a husband and children but still manages to excel in her career. This provokes Jac because she will not let "someone like that beat her." Jac believes the only reason she secured a job at Holby City hospital is because she is an old friend of CEO Henrik Hanssen (Guy Henry).

When a patient dies suddenly during an operation carried out by Jac, Sahira helps her find evidence about what has happened. Marcel said that this makes Jac wary because she "fears it's an opportunity for Sahira to stitch her up." Marcel noted that Jac is not opposed to using Sahira for "team work" to achieve "great surgery". They cooperate and discover that the patient had been involved in a suicide pact. She caused a motorbike crash and ingested blood thinning chemicals to sabotage any surgical efforts to save her life.

She told a Daily Mirror journalist that Jac and Sahira have "a tense relationship" filled with "lots of one liners" and is kept is solely work related. Rouass thought that the rivalry never got "too serious" and the "catty comments" gave the story a "fun element". She told a reporter from the Bath Chronicle that "they're both very competitive and focused and both want the same outcome but they do it in different ways and have different approaches to their job." Rouass added that the characters are both "exceptional" at work and actually respect one another. Rouass told Daniel Kilkelly of Digital Spy that while Jac and Sahira shared a "silent respect" over work, the characters are "completely different". Sahira "kills people with kindness" rather than being sly. She added that Jac makes Sahira feel "threatened".

=== Jonny Maconie and pregnancy ===
While attending a people skills course, Jac has a one-night stand with Jonny Maconie (Michael Thomson), who is later introduced to the series as a regular character. Jac is under the impression that Jonny is a neurosurgeon, so she is surprised to learn that he is really a nurse and about to start working at Holby as part of the transplant team. Thompson said Jonny is "like the kryptonite to Jac's super ice maiden." He is not intimidated by Jac and she does not know what to make of him, leading to a "fiery" relationship. Jac and Jonny break up after a few months, but Thomson believed there was unfinished business between them. He explained, "She's messed with his head, and he wants to fix her. He wants to prove to her that it's all right to be warm and love people." Jac and Jonny briefly get back together, however, when Jac learns that her former boyfriend Joseph Byrne is getting married, she initially takes her frustration out on Jonny and later has sex with paediatrician Sean Dolan (Wil Johnson). Jac leaves for Japan to study some new medical techniques, and on her return she tells Jonny that she loves him. Thomson said that the declaration and her show of commitment "blows Jonny's mind and takes their relationship in a new direction."

While performing a preliminary procedure on a patient, Jac experiences some pain and Jonny worries that it could be related to her kidney. Knowing that she donated one to her estranged mother, he is worried that she could be in danger if the remaining one fails. Jac orders some tests, but they come back clear. She is later forced to abandon her patient during surgery, as she is overcome by pain again and has to lie down. Jac meets with her consultant obstetrician and gynaecologist Derwood Thompson (Ben Hull), who informs her that she has endometriosis, a condition which greatly reduces her chances of conceiving. Jac keeps her diagnosis from Jonny, knowing that he wants a family, while he surprises her by asking her to move in with him. Thomson pointed out that it was not unusual for Jac to hide something from Jonny, because she had built up many defences over the years when she felt scared. A "bitter row" breaks out between Jac and Jonny over her treatment of Tara Lo (Jing Lusi), who was affected by her brain tumour while assisting Jac during surgery. Jonny disagrees with Jac's decision to ask Tara to leave the theatre, and she ends up slapping him across the face. Jonny then ends their relationship, leaving Jac feeling isolated.

Following Tara's funeral, Jac and Jonny have a one-night stand, but they both tell Mo Effanga (Chizzy Akudolu) separately that they do not plan on getting back together. Jac later learns that she is pregnant with Jonny's baby. When Jonny finds out that Jac told Mo about the baby before him, he confronts Jac, who is overcome with "uncharacteristic" emotion and bursts into tears. Jonny later performs an ultrasound scan on Jac and they get to see their baby for the first time. During Jac's 20-week scan, she and Jonny are informed that their baby has a congenital diaphragmatic hernia, meaning it has a 50% chance of survival after birth. They also told that further tests need to be carried out, before they can talk about their options.

=== Temporary departure ===
On 11 August 2014, it was announced that Marcel was pregnant with her first child and that Jac would take a break from Holby City. Jac exits in the seventeenth series episode "Go the Distance", originally broadcast on 14 April 2015, after reuniting with Jonny. Thomson also decided to leave the show to return to theatrical projects. Thomson explained that viewers wished for a "happy ending" for Jac, which happens through her and Jonny's departure. He thought that it was a perfect conclusion to Jac and Jonny's relationship as they establish their family life. The actor added that Jac and Jonny have realised "what they mean to each other". Marcel and Thomson made a guest appearance together in the series 17 episode "Spiral Staircases", originally broadcast on 23 June 2015.

Before Marcel took maternity leave, her co-star, Paul Bradley, decided to leave his role as Elliot Hope. Marcel asked producers to return for his exit episode before she left and producers agreed as they also shared an interest in arranging this. A show trailer previewing Jac's appearance was released on 16 September 2015, and the appearance features in the series 17 episode "At First I Was Afraid", originally broadcast on 22 September 2015. Jac mentions that she and Jonny have separated. Holby City series producer Simon Harper clarified that their split was "perfectly amiable" and they are sharing parental responsibility of Emma. He also pointed out even though the characters tried a relationship, their alternative personalities meant it would not succeed. Marcel expanded on the breakdown of the relationship, stating that Jac dislikes how Jonny did not aspire to be "anything other than a nurse". The actress opined that Jac is better as a single woman. She also added that the failure of the relationship allows Jac to "toughen up" and return to her meaner personality.

Harper confirmed in October 2015 that Jac would return during the following month, and Jac returns in the eighteenth series episode "A Delicate Truth", originally broadcast on 24 November 2015. Harper revealed that Jac would return "with a bang" as she reclaims her status as the head of Darwin ward and reassesses the ward's structure and staffing. Marcel added, "She's in full-on Jac mode now and demands to know exactly what's going on." Jac immediately decides to make her junior doctors, Oliver and Zosia March (Camilla Arfwedson), prove themselves by handing them bad jobs. Marcel explained that this method works and gives Jac the best doctors on her cardiothoracic team. Following her return, there is more emphasis on Jac's bitchy personality, something which Marcel also wanted to reinforce. She thought that the character had proved popular and remained on the drama due to her villainous characterisation. Marcel struggled to readjust to the schedule of working on Holby City after being on maternity leave.

=== Matteo Rossini ===
Christian Vit was cast as Matteo Rossini, a cardiothoracic consultant, in 2016. Matteo was introduced as a rival and possible love interest for Jac. Jac instantly dislikes Matteo and clashes with him when he begins to work on her patient. Vit explained that Matteo would prefer to challenge Jac's behaviour than leave her alone. Jac then discovers that Matteo was in the team who stole her Stent research, infuriating her. Matteo tells Jac that he did not intend to "steal" her project, but she does not believe him and claims one of Matteo's ideas for their patient. Vit pointed out that Matteo "immediately realises what kind of character Jac is", but is also fascinated by her. Writers placed the characters in a "cat and mouse" game as Matteo tries to impress Jac with his "Italian charm". Vit commented, "With Jac, he knows he'll always be on thin ice!"

=== Fletch ===
Holby City series producer Kate Hall announced plans in August 2017 to pair Jac with director of nursing Adrian "Fletch" Fletcher (Alex Walkinshaw). Marcel and Walkinshaw previously portrayed a couple in The Bill and were pleased to work with each other. When Walkinshaw joined Holby City, writers inserted a reference to the actors' history in an episode. Marcel had previously called for Walkinshaw to be introduced into the show in 2011, so Jac could have a romance with a character he played. Despite this, when Jac and Fletch were paired together, the actors were not pleased as they did not feel the characters were well-suited. Hall wanted to pair the characters because she liked the connection between Marcel and Walkinshaw, calling it "palpable", "delicious and electric". She compared the matching to characters Maddie Hayes (Cybill Shepherd) and David Addison (Bruce Willis) in Moonlighting and Peter Joshua (Cary Grant) and Reggie Lampert (Audrey Hepburn) in Charade. Marcel enjoyed playing the Moonlighting comparison, but opined that Walkinshaw is the Maddie to her David.

Walkinshaw identified how Jac and Fletch have contrasting personalities and opined that the pairing would be "interesting" as Fletch is not afraid to challenge Jac's formidable behaviour. He added that Fletch would not be "intimidated" by Jac. Walkinshaw explained that this is refreshing for Jac as she is accustomed to "having a man standing opposite her desk, to attention, while she's sitting telling them off and letting them know exactly how the land lies." The actor added that although Fletch finds Jac scary, he is not afraid to challenge how she speaks to him or his nursing staff, reminding her that she is not their boss. He also looked forward to filming scenes where they clash, and scenes where they bond.

The story begins in the nineteenth series when Jac assists Fletch with a patient. The story was filmed on the AAU set, where Fletch is based, which Marcel enjoyed as she rarely films away from Darwin ward. Jac later uncharacteristically takes "her guard down" around Fletch and grieves for her recently murdered half-sister, Jasmine Burrows (Lucinda Dryzek), which strengthens her bond with Fletch. The characters continue to bond as Fletch moves to Darwin ward and they work together more. On their bond, a What's on TV reporter noted, "it's obvious Jac has eyes for Fletch". Marcel took a three-month break from the drama in 2018, pausing the budding relationship. When Jac returns, it is apparent that Fletch has missed her, which Marcel liked. The actress thought it was clear that the characters had strong feelings for each other. Jac does not return for a relationship with Fletch, which disappoints him. However, he is still supportive when she prepares for her operation. Reflecting on the pairing in August 2019, Marcel explained that it would not be viable as Jac would "hurt him and then everybody would be upset that she hurt him".

=== Shooting and recovery problems ===
After the shooting Jac takes time off work to recuperate from her injuries. While she is away scar tissue forms and begins to cause Jac more pain. Professor John Gaskell (Paul McGann) recommends that Jac takes part in his dodgy stem-cell treatment trial and he will perform the operation. Marcel told from Jayne-Tyler from Inside Soap that upon Jac's return "she seems healthy and fit when she returns, but she's masking quite a lot of pain." Jac "thought long and hard" about her options and she decides that Gaskell's plan is her best chance. Marcel described portraying Jac's difficult year of recovery as exhausting and a "tough year". She explained that she would often take Jac's emotional baggage home with her as she learned lines.

=== Mental health ===
Producers decided to tackle mental health with the character in 2019. Jane Wallbank, the show's series producer, explained that Jac's professional and personal lives would place her under pressure, especially as she tries to prioritise her relationship with Emma (Darcey Burke). Marcel noted that as a long-term "strongest character" in the show, Jac appears "infallible and unbreakable" through her many dramas, but it has taken a toll on her mind and body. Holby City had previously tackled mental health with Sacha and Marcel thought it was "important" to portray female mental health and how women can struggle to maintain a job and family life. The story coincides with the guest returns of Joseph and Elliot, two important figures in Jac's life. Wallbank told Dainty (Digital Spy) that she wanted their returns to impact Jac's story. Joseph returns at a point when Jac begins to struggle and Elliot's return occurs as the plot climaxes. She also praised Marcel's performances as Jac as "heart wrenching", and confirmed that the story would feature on-location scenes. Marcel was excited about the story and how Joseph and Elliot's returns tied into it. She called it "personal to [her] and for [her] character". Bradley labelled the storyline "intense and vital" with "loads of twists and turns". Marcel thought that the story could signify "the end of Jac" as not many characters would be able to recover from it. She added that the story would "frighten" viewers, but also "open [their] eyes" and encourage them to talk about their feelings. The plot was previewed in the show's seasonal trailer, released on 4 September 2019.

Marcel struggled filming the story and named it "the hardest thing I've ever had to do". The actress has depression, anxiety and depersonalization disorder and in 2016, she had a breakdown on the show's set as a result of this. Knowing this, Marcel was surprised that the producers had created this story for her character. She felt "frightened" and "very sad" to be approached about the plot and had to question whether she wanted to do it. The actress received lots of encouragement from her agent and the producers, specifically Kate Oates, the Head of Continuing Drama at BBC Studios. Oates wanted to give Marcel the opportunity to read scripts early and be involved in the writing process. The pair shared a long conversation where Marcel expressed her concerns. Upon speaking to her husband, Marcel realised how important it was to portray the issue. The actress used her own experience to accurately portray Jac's story and was involved in the writing process. She was also granted a day in therapy each week while portraying the story. One of Marcel's main concerns was that she would be putting her mental health at risk by portraying Jac's story, but decided that as long as she stayed healthy, she could do the plot "justice".

Elements of the story begin when Jac resigns from her clinical lead position after choosing to focus on herself and her family. Jac's decision marks a long-term change in direction for the character. Marcel explained that Jac is "a lonely person" whose life revolves around her work. When Emma arrives on Darwin with Jonny's pregnant fiancée Stacey Clarkson (Emily Bowker), Jac is confronted with how she has become an "absent parent" in Emma's life. She consequently decides to hand over clinical lead duties to Kian Madani (Ramin Karimloo). Marcel enjoyed seeing the "softer side" of Jac, but did not want to stray from "the Jac we all love to hate!" The actress enjoyed working with her Darwin co-stars – Karimloo, Belinda Owusu (Nicky McKendrick) and Amy Lennox (Chloe Godard) – and commented, "I have the best team, we get the most fantastic storylines – Darwin wins hands down every time!"

After attending Jonny and Stacey's wedding, Jac returns and is surprised to see Joseph and Faye at the hospital. Joseph's appearance proves confronting for Jac, who has to "face up to her everlasting love for Joseph". Following Joseph's return, Jac takes herself away from the hospital and the character is absent from the show for a few weeks. Writers created issues in Jac's home life through her relationship with Emma. After Stacey informs Jac that she and Jonny are moving to Edinburgh and that Jonny wants custody of Emma, Jac suffers a panic attack. Marcel told Wilson (What's on TV) that combined with the past few years, "Jac's life is in chaos", which would build towards "something dramatic". Jac eventually decides to withdraw custody of her daughter, having become "convinced that her daughter is better off without her". The decision came after Jac finds Emma playing with hospital equipment and consequently shows her the hospital mortuary. Frightened, Emma runs away and is nearly hit by an ambulance. Marcel and her husband found this scene "distressing" to watch. Jac then has a "heartbreaking" talk with Emma where she informs her of her decision. Marcel explained that Jac is acting in a "quite unusual" manner, and rejecting support from anyone, which stems from her lonely childhood. The actress said, "She's only ever been able to rely on herself, so it's very hard for her to hand the reins over to someone else and trust them with personal stuff."

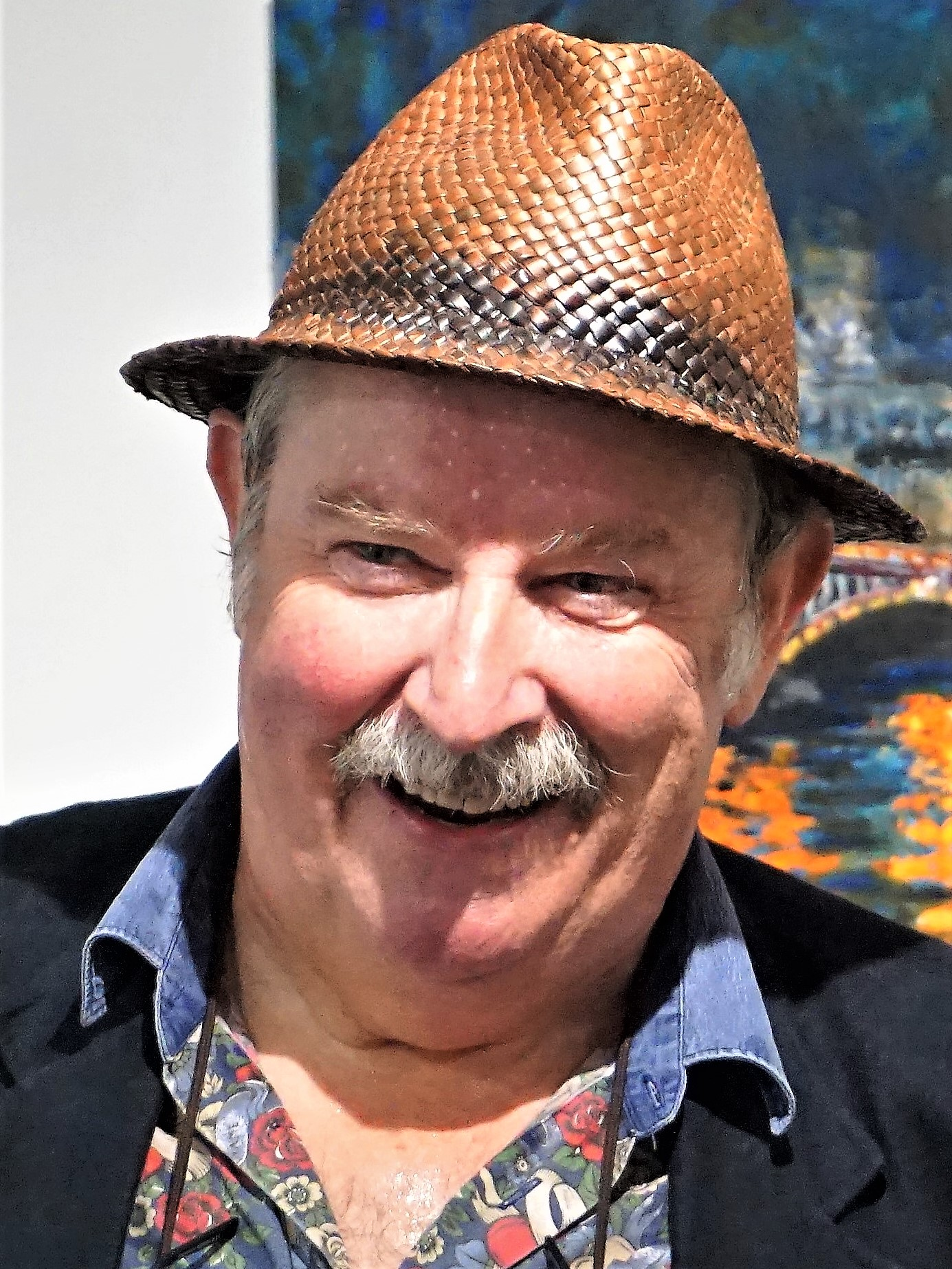
Paul Bradley reprises his role as Elliot for the story.

Jac and her mental health story were central to the show's 1000th episode. In the narrative, the hospital marks its 150-year milestone and Jac performs her 1000th transplant. Bradley's return stint also begins in the episode and the actor commented, "There are real fireworks in the story and it gets pretty hairy!" The episode was filmed on the hottest day of the year, but the episode was set in November so they had to appear cold. Marcel noted that Elliot's return opens "Jac's heart a little bit" as well as "some old wounds" because Jac views Elliot as the "father she never had". She also opined that Jac would still be struggling if Elliot had not have returned, but his return has "sped up the process for Jac" due to his own health issues. Elliot notices a change in Jac's attitude and tries to understand her better. Bradley explained that based on his own struggle with mental health, Elliot recognises that Jac is not well. Wallbank said that although "he and Jac need each other the most", the story focus heavily on "whether they will actually reach out to one another before it's too late". Bradley added that both Jac and Elliot are "very good at concealing what is upsetting them", which they recognise in each other.

The story then shifted focus to Jac's professional life as she treats Stage 4 cancer patient, Sandra Jackson (Vicky Entwistle). Jac goes against the advice of Elliot and clinical lead Kian and offers Sandra an alternative operation, which has more risks. Elliot becomes worried that a struggling Jac is tackling too much. Writers killed-off Sandra and used her death to add to Jac's fears that she is failing as a mother and surgeon, growing "paranoid that everyone's out to get her". On Jac's breakdown, Marcel said, "She's the queen of the comeback and very strong but we all have our breaking point." She added that she liked exposing Jac's vulnerable nature. Following Sandra's death, Jac has to face a mortality and morbidity review, where some of her colleagues question whether she was fit to perform surgery. Having investigated the surgery, Elliot asks whether Jac is suffering with a mental health issue and also reveals that he is ill and in need of a high-risk operation.

Writers intertwined the stories of Jac and Kian to lead into the next stages of their stories. When Kian's girlfriend, Bea Kaminski (Rosalind Halstead), is readmitted onto Darwin for surgery, she begs Kian for an alternative surgery, so he asks the "increasingly-irrational" Jac, who refuses. In surgery, Kian risks his career and sabotages the operation so that Bea can have the surgery she wants. Once the operation is complete, Jac is "incandescent with rage" and confronts Kian, which is witnessed by new CEO Max McGerry (Jo Martin), who reprimands them both. Having witnessed Jac's successful operation on Bea, Elliot decides to ask Jac to perform his surgery, despite protests from Fletch, who does not believe she is well enough. Aware that she is struggling, Jac decides to confide in Fletch, but they are interrupted by his girlfriend, Ange Godard (Dawn Steele); Jac then decides not to speak to Fletch. Marcel explained that Jac feels uncomfortable sharing her feelings because she has grown up independently and learnt not to trust or rely on other people.

The story reaches a climax when Jac suffers a mental breakdown on the day of Elliot's operation. Marcel pointed out that the operation marks "the straw that breaks the camel's back" for Jac. She told Tyler (Inside Soap) that "there's only so much you can take before you break", which has happened to Jac. Marcel thought that Jac's history combined with the idea of losing Elliot and not seeing Emma contributed to her character's breakdown. In the build-up to the surgery, Jac begins to lack focus, suffering "absentee moments" and not remembering what she is doing. Despite this, Jac starts to perform surgery, however, when something goes wrong, she loses focus and suffers a breakdown. Marcel commented, "She's cracked. It's happened." The actress explained that Jac "doesn't know how to control herself and she just loses it". As she walks out of theatre, Jac injures her colleagues, but can only focus on if Elliot will die. Jac flees the hospital to the car park with Emma and they are followed by Fletch. Publicly, Jac then has a "very emotional and overwhelming breakdown". The scene was filmed in one take and Marcel warned Walkinshaw that he had to get it correct first time. Marcel hit Walkinshaw multiple times during the scene. To make the scene realistic, Marcel did not rehearse and did not consider different ways of portraying the breakdown. Therefore, Walkinshaw had to fit his lines in wherever he could and had to reposition Marcel during her breakdown so that she was facing the camera. Marcel praised Walkinshaw for his work on the scenes and for helping her mental health off-screen too. Due to the nature of the breakdown scene, Burke was not permitted to be included for the breakdown. They then re-shot the scenes where Jac appears less upset to include Emma. Marcel found it "horrendous" to film Jac's breakdown as it felt realistic for her. She revealed that to make her portrayal realistic, she had to revisit her own troubles and replicate a breakdown. For filming the breakdown, Marcel did not have any makeup applied or her hair styled. The actress stated that she struggles to watch the breakdown scene and while she is "extremely proud", it does "upset [her] greatly".

Focus was then moved to the aftermath of Jac's breakdown and her recovery. On the aftermath, Marcel teased, "Life is going to get significantly worse for Jac before it gets better and I'm not sure where it will leave her." The actress observed that Jac is "at a really critical point in her life". Advanced spoilers, released on 21 November 2019, revealed that Jac would receive treatment in a Psychiatric Unit, where she would be visited by Fletch, Sacha and Elliot, dubbed the "three wise men". Marcel explained that Jac has a good relationship with Fletch, Sacha and Elliot because while "they don't let her get away with anything", they also understand and respect Jac, which makes Jac "[love] them and [respect] them". Following her breakdown, Jac is sectioned at a secure psychiatric unit, but does not believe she is unwell. Marcel pointed out that Jac "feels like everybody else is to blame". Fletch is the first person to visit Jac and she rejects him as she blames him for calling the psychiatric team and having Emma removed from her. Afterwards, Sacha visits her, but she blames him for not being there to help her and hits him. Upon Barrett's request, Marcel hit him for real, but they did not tell anyone as insurance purposes would have prevented it from happening. Elliot then visits Jac and Marcel told Wilson (What's on TV) that Elliot's "beautiful soul and calming nature" helps Jac to soften. She added that Elliot just talks to Jac where others have told her that she is unwell, which helps Jac begin her recovery. Marcel was keen for Jac's recovery to take time and for her not to return to work quickly. She was also unsure about whether Jac could continue with her life without "drastically" changing it.

After filming Jac's sectioning episode, Marcel took three weeks of leave as she felt that she was in a "really tired, dark place" and needed to recover. Upon Jac's return, writers reintroduced Kian into the story as he becomes a support for Jac. Marcel confirmed the development in an interview with Filiz Mustafa of Digital Spy, noting that the pair share a backstory through their time at university.

=== Departure and return ===
On 26 January 2021, it was announced that Marcel had decided to leave Holby City. Marcel told Sophie Dainty from Digital Spy that "I'm sad obviously – I love the show and I've been there a really long time." Marcel added that it was a "big decision" but she had become tired and wanted a break from acting to spend more time with her family. Jac's final episode aired on 2 February 2021. Dainty revealed that the episode would "see her life left on the line" after she and Kian are held at gun point.

In July 2021, it was confirmed that a former character would make a return, but their identity was concealed to maintain a surprise for the audience. Jac was revealed as the return in the twenty-third series' seventeenth episode, originally broadcast on 27 July 2021. Marcel had to drive onto set wearing a hat, mask and sunglasses to ensure that the public did not recognise her. She was pleased to return to the show and commented, "The bitch is back and it's going to [be] epic!!" Dainty (Digital Spy) confirmed that her return was permanent. In the narrative, Jac is employed by the Care Quality Commission (CQC) as the hospital's director of improvement. As part of her new initiative, she hires Eli Ebrahimi (Davood Ghadami) to run Darwin ward. Both Marcel and Ghadami were pleased to be working together. Ghadami explained that Jac is relying on Eli, so he is unafraid to challenge her. He thought that fans of the character would find it interesting to see Jac "shaken up". Marcel later confirmed that her departure was "fake" and designed to be a publicity stunt for viewers. She noted that it was successful because the character's name was trending on social media network Twitter when the episode was broadcast.

=== Brain tumour and death ===
On 2 June 2021, it was announced that the BBC had decided to cancel Holby City at the end of its twenty-third series. It was confirmed that the final episode would be broadcast in March 2022. The show's story producer Ben Wadey told Calli Kitson from Metro that writers were tasked with creating suitable endings for all the regular characters. The Holby City production team decided to kill Jac off and created a final episode that revolves around her death. The show's story producer Ben Wadey did not want to frustrate viewers with "unfinished business". Wadey believed that the finality of cancellation created grief and he wanted to ensure this was personified in the story, believing Jac was the correct character to end the show. By now, Marcel's longevity had made Jac one of the show's long-featured characters. Producers informed Marcel about Jac's planned death and upset with their decision, Marcel fought with them. Marcel told Laura-Jayne Tyler (Inside Soap) that she became "exhausted" trying to change their decision and which led to writers offering Marcel more in depth discussion over her character's demise. Marcel claimed that once she "begrudgingly" accepted Jac's death and she concentrated on making the story "the best it could possibly be". In November 2021, Marcel told Inside Soap's Tyler that she felt like she was grieving death when she realised she could not play Jac again.

To reach Jac's demise writers created a terminal brain tumour storyline. The scenes, which were broadcast in August 2021, depict Jac with fraught determination to restructure the hospital and prevent its closure. She eventually reveals to Henrik that her behaviour is the result of her brain tumour diagnosis. Jac is portrayed determined to find a cure for her tumour. She and Eli begin researching a life saving stent trial which could be applied to her own treatment plan. After the unsuccessful trial, writers portrayed an increasingly desperate Jac turning to her mentee Nicky for help and even requests she do the surgery. As her condition deteriorates, Writers brought back the characters of Guy Self (John Michie) and Elliot Hope for the final part of Jac's story. Jac's asks for Guy's help to remove the tumour, but he refuses because it would cause a stroke. Elliot thinks of a new procedure to remove Jac's tumour. He decides that putting Jac's body in a state of controlled hypothermia will give her the best chance of survival in the operating theatre. The outcome of the operation was not revealed in spoilers and viewers found out Jac's fate when the scenes were broadcast. In the series' penultimate episode, Jac survives Elliot's operation despite him failing to remove her brain tumour.

Jac's final appearance occurred in the show's finale episode, which was broadcast on 29 March 2022. Marcel said the final episode would be "spectacular" and "amazing". She also revealed that multiple former cast members would return for the episode. In the scenes, Jac implements an advance healthcare directive to prevent medical assistance when her condition deteriorates. Jac suffers a stroke and the directive forces her colleagues to not intervene. Jac dies and her colleagues congregate around her bedside. They then begin the process of organ retrieval and set up transplant procedures. Jac's organ donation saves multiple lives, including Alexandra 'Lexy' Dunblane (Jenny Howe) who receives her heart. Various former characters are portrayed receiving Jac's organs at different locations as they prepare to carry out surgery. One character who returns in the finale is Jac's former love interest, Joseph Bryne. It was Marcel's request that Joseph returned for the scenes because she wanted closure for the character's relationship. Marcel said that she "had to fight" the show's writers for Joseph to collect Jac's organ and transplant it. They informed Marcel that Joseph had left his career in surgery to become and general practitioner, but Marcel remained insistent.

Despite the depiction of Jac's being determination to survive her brain tumour, writers wanted to explore the harsh reality of terminal illness. They conveyed the fact that positive prognosis cannot always be achieved in medicine. Wadey explained that in reality the NHS do not always cure everyone. He wanted the show to end realistically and go back to its "roots for the finale". He believed that Jac's condition was fragile and to include a miracle cure would have been inaccurate and misleading. Marcel revealed that filming her final scenes was emotional. Some of Jac's finale scenes did not require her presence, such as Fletch wheeling Jac to the mortuary. Marcel revealed that Walkinshaw had fun filming the scene and even recorded Marcel a "hilarious" video of Fletch escorting Jac's body to the song "Ding dong the witch is dead". In the show's final scenes, Marcel provided a voice-over monologue to end the show. In the monologue Jac details what the meaning of the NHS. Wadey said that he "loved" the final scenes with Jac's monologue because "it makes sense in that moment."

=== Other appearances ===
Alongside her appearances in Holby City, Marcel has played Jac in the show's sister shows, HolbyBlue and Casualty. Jac appears in the opening episode of HolbyBlue's second series, first broadcast in 2008. Marcel first appears in Casualty for one episode, originally aired in February 2016, during its thirty series to coincide with the appearance of Sam Strachan (Chambers). She later makes cameo appearances in Casualty's thirtieth anniversary episode, originally broadcast in August 2016, and an episode of the thirty-first series, originally broadcast in September 2016.

Kate Hall, the then-series producer, confirmed in August 2017 that Marcel would reprise her role in Casualty for two episodes, and Jac appears in two episodes of series 32, first broadcast in February 2018, where she is involved in a storyline with Ethan Hardy (George Rainsford). Producers of Holby City and Casualty planned a crossover event for the shows in 2018, prominently featuring Jac and Casualty character Connie Beauchamp (Amanda Mealing), who formerly appeared in Holby City. Executive producer Simon Harper explained that both casts would be featured "striving heroically against the odds in two episodes of pure, nail-biting, taut, emotional medical drama." The episode was filmed in November 2018 and first broadcast in March 2019. Marcel reprises her role as Jac again in a thirty-fourth series of Casualty, first broadcast in August 2019. The character stars opposite consultant Dylan Keogh (William Beck) and nurse David Hide (Jason Durr) as she operates on David's teenage son, Oliver Hide (Harry Collett).

== Reception ==
Marcel has been nominated for several awards for her portrayal of Jac. She received consecutive "Best Actress" longlist nominations at the 2009 and 2010 TV Choice Awards, and later in 2010, was longlisted for the "Best Drama Performance" accolade at the National Television Awards, alongside her co-star Roberts. At the 2017 Inside Soap Awards, Marcel received a longlist nomination for Best Drama Star, while Jasmine's death received a longlist nomination for Best Drama Storyline. Two years later, she won the Best Drama Star accolade. She was shocked to have won and praised the audience's "commitment" to Holby City. Marcel was nominated again at the 2020 awards, and won the award again in 2021. She was surprised by the win due to her co-stars also being nominated for the award, but accredited the win to the character's mental health story. For her portrayal of Jac, Marcel was nominated for Best Soap Actor (Female) at the 2018 Digital Spy Reader Awards; she came in seventh place with 6.4% of the total votes.

An Inside Soap reporter's first impressions of Jac were that she is a "leather-clad biker" and "feisty surgeon". Jac became so popular that viewers created a fan site for the character. In 2008, Marcel declared "it's sweet that they love Jac enough to dedicate a website to her – considering what a bitch she is!" Katy Moon of Inside Soap said "over the years, Jac Naylor has had many adversaries", "is used to playing dirty" and "is known for her ruthless streak." Her colleague, Laura-Jayne Tyler, described the character as "fearsome", the "Queen of Holby City", and "Holby's formidable cardio queen". Tyler called Jac's breakdown "powerful scenes that Holby viewers won't forget in a long time." Series producer Kate Hall noticed that non-romantic pairings, such as Jac and Sacha, were more popular than romantic pairings. Susanna Galton of the Daily Mirror called Jac an "uptight heart consultant" and a "frosty-faced, hard-as-nails doc who viewers have grown to love".

Victoria Wilson from What's on TV branded Jac the show's "resident ice queen", and called the love triangle between Jac, Joseph and Faye one of Holby City's most "gripping love triangle[s]". She also dubbed Jac and Joseph's romance as "one of the medical drama's greatest ever love stories". When Jac resigns as clinical lead, Wilson wrote, "Holby City fans probably can't imagine anyone in charge of Darwin ward over fiery surgeon Jac Naylor." Her colleague, Elaine Reilly, described Jac as a "cutting-edge surgeon", "super" and "abrupt". She liked the character's witty remarks and created a list of her favourites from 2019. Reilly said that Jac and Faye meeting again created "quite the reunion – full of bile, backbiting and ferocious one-liners". She also enjoyed the character's interactions with Dylan Keogh, writing, "fans of Jac and Dylan [...] are in for a treat as these two equally abrupt medics bump heads!"

Sue Haasler, writing for the Metro, praised the "incredible" working relationship between Marcel and Roberts. She wrote, "They showed us the history of Jac and Joseph – the passion and the pain alike – in their facial expressions, the yearning in their eyes as they looked at each other." Likewise, Dainty (Digital Spy) called the character's connection "powerful – and very palpable". Dainty (Digital Spy) noted that viewers were "simply heartbroken" about Jac giving up custody of Emma. She also opined that the character's mental health story was "sad", "devastating" and "heart-wrenching". Her colleague, Mustafa, observed that viewers were "devastated" by Jac's breakdown and praised Marcel's "superb performance during the emotional scenes". She later noted how viewers "struggled with Jac's devastating breakdown" and praised Marcel's "stellar performance during the tense scenes". Haasler (Metro) praised Marcel's "heartbreaking" acting and dubbed Jac's breakdown "a highly dramatic ending to what was a really gripping and, at times, difficult episode to watch." She added, "These scenes were deeply upsetting, with Rosie Marcel tapping into such a well of despair that it all felt very real."

Writing about Jac's mental health story, Wilson (What's on TV) said, "Jac Naylor is often the one person at Holby City hospital who always seems in control. But she's been displaying some rather unusual behaviour of late and doing things that are totally out of character for the Jac Naylor we all know and love..." Jac's mental health story sparked a big response from viewers, who contacted Marcel to persuade her not to leave the drama. The actress was surprised by the response, commenting, "I knew that Jac was popular, but I didn't really realise just how much until I hinted this might be the end." She later stated that fans were "genuinely quite heartbroken" for the character because they have watched "a character that they love so much turn into something she's not".

Marcel's co-stars praised her performances and acting techniques as Jac in interviews with Haasler for the book Holby City: Behind the Screen. David Ajao (Damon Ford) called Marcel a "professional" and said how her work as Jac had inspired him. Eleanor Fanyinka (Morven Digby) said that Marcel's "stillness and her power is phenomenal".

== Bibliography ==
- Haasler, Sue (2018). Holby City: Behind the Screen. SilverWood Books Ltd. ISBN 978-1-78132-562-9.
