= Daddy's Little Girl (film) =

- Film poster
- Directed by: Chris Sun
- Written by: Chris Sun
- Produced by: Leah Bray; Sean Gannon; Dominic Crisci
- Starring: Billi Baker; Michael Thomson; Allira Jaques; Holly Phillips; Rebecca Plint; Sean Gannon; Christian Radford; Mirko Grillini; Brooke Chamberlain; Anthony Thomas
- Cinematography: Scott Kimber
- Edited by: Michael Gilbert; Antonia Vlahovic
- Music by: Mark Smythe
- Release date: August 2012
- Running time: 107 minutes
- Country: Australia
- Language: English

Daddy's Little Girl is a 2012 Australian horror thriller film written and directed by Chris Sun. It stars Billi Baker, Michael Thomson, Allira Jaques, Holly Phillips, Rebecca Plint and Sean Gannon.

It was filmed on the Sunshine Coast in Queensland and is claimed to be based on actual events that occurred on the Sunshine Coast.

== Plot ==
The film follows Derek, a devoted father whose life is shattered when his young daughter Georgia is abducted from her mother's home and murdered. In the aftermath of the tragedy, Derek struggles to cope with his grief, leaning on the support of his close friend Colin and his brother Tommy. As his mental state deteriorates, Derek begins experiencing vivid hallucinations of Georgia, speaking to her as though she were still alive.

During a house party, Derek stumbles upon Tommy’s diary and makes a horrifying discovery: within its pages, Tommy admits to kidnapping and murdering Georgia as an act of revenge against Derek for firing him from his shop. The diary also reveals that Tommy is responsible for the sexual assault and murder of several other children.

Though Derek initially considers turning the diary over to the police, he ultimately decides that legal justice isn't enough. Under the pretense of spending time together, Derek invites Tommy to his home and secretly drugs him. Tommy awakens bound in Derek’s basement, where Derek subjects him to several days of brutal torture as retribution for his crimes against Georgia and the other victims.

Eventually, Derek reveals what he has done to Colin. After Derek is apprehended by the police, the film concludes with newspaper headlines reporting that Tommy was convicted of the murders and sentenced to 25 years in prison, while Derek received an unspecified jail sentence for the torture of his brother.

== Cast ==
- Billi Baker as Georgia Riley
- Michael Thomson as Derek Riley
- Allira Jaques as Stacey
- Holly Phillips as Sian
- Rebecca Plint as Tanya
- Sean Gannon as Colin
- Christian Radford as Thomas "Tommy" Riley
- Mirko Grillini as Tony
- Brooke Chamberlain as Melissa
- Anthony Thomas as Derek's Father

== Accolades ==
Award	Category	Subject	Result
Australian Screen Industry Network Awards	Best Feature Film	Chris Sun	Won
Australian Screen Industry Network Awards	Best Director	Chris Sun	Won
Australian Screen Industry Network Awards	Best Screenplay/Writer	Chris Sun	Won
Australian Screen Industry Network Awards	Best Producer	Kayla Arena	Won
Australian Screen Industry Network Awards	Best Cinematographer	Scott Kimber	Won
Australian Screen Industry Network Awards	Best Composer	Mark Smythe	Won
Australian Screen Industry Network Awards	Best Actress	Allira Jaques	Won
Australian Screen Industry Network Awards	Best Actor	Michael Thomson	Won
PollyGrind Underground Film Festival of Las Vegas	Acting Award for Best Overall Individual Performance	Michael Thomson	Won
PollyGrind Underground Film Festival of Las Vegas	Biggest Baddest Mother of the PollyGrind	Chris Sun	Won
