= Daddy's Little Girl (disambiguation) =

"Daddy's Little Girl" is a song played at weddings.

Daddy's Little Girl may also refer to:

- An especially cherished or spoiled daughter (see Electra complex)
- Daddy's Little Girl (novel), a 2002 novel by Mary Higgins Clark
- Daddy's Little Girl (film), a 2012 Australian horror thriller film

== Music ==
- Daddy's Little Girl (album), a 1991 album by Nikki D
- "Daddy's Little Girl" (Frankie J song), from his 2006 album Priceless
- "Daddy's Little Girl", a song by J. Cole

== Television ==
- "Daddy's Little Girl" (The 4400), a 2007 episode
- "Daddy's Little Girl" (CSI: Crime Scene Investigation), a 2006 episode
- "Daddy's Little Girl" (Family Matters), a 1991 episode
- "Daddy's Little Girl" (Three's a Crowd), a 1984 episode

== See also ==
- "Daddy's Li'l Girl", a song by Bikini Kill
- Daddy's Little Girls, a 2007 romantic drama film by Tyler Perry, based on his eponymous stage play
- "Daddy's Little Monster", an episode of Adventure Time
