= Tasmina Perry =

British writer

- Occupation: Novelist
- Writing career
- Period: 2006–present
- Genre: Drama
- Website: tasminaperry.com

Tasmina Perry is a British novelist. Her novels have been bestsellers in The Sunday Times and have been published in 17 countries. Perry is also a journalist and magazine editor, and edits a daily blog on travel, style and the places that have inspired her novels.

== Writing career ==
A trained lawyer, Perry switched to the world of women's magazines in the mid-nineties. She won the New Journalist of the Year Award and went on to write for Marie Claire, Glamour and Heat, also launching her own travel and style magazine, Jaunt. She was editing InStyle magazine when she signed a book deal with publishers HarperCollins and left the world of magazines to concentrate on her writing career.

Perry's debut novel, Daddy's Girls, was an immediate success. Her subsequent novels have been equally well-received, with Perfect Strangers, for example, being described by Heat magazine as 'a fast-paced, glamorous and enthralling tale'.

Perry has also co-written a series of YA vampire novels with her husband John Perry, under the pseudonym Mia James. The first in the series, By Midnight, was described by the Daily Record as 'outstanding'.

Tasmina Perry is a regular contributor to TV and radio. She has also been a mentor for the Marie Claire/Princes Trust Inspire and Mentor campaign. She was also a judge at the 2011 P&G beauty awards.

== Personal life ==
Perry lives in London with her husband, the writer and former magazine editor John Perry.

She graduated from Birmingham University with an LLB degree in law in 1990.

== Selected works ==
- Daddy's Girls (2006)
- Gold Diggers (2007)
- Guilty Pleasures (2008)
- Original Sin (2009)
- Kiss Heaven Goodbye (2010)
- Private Lives (2011)
- Perfect Strangers (2012)
- Deep Blue Sea (2013)
- The Proposal (2013)
- The Last Kiss Goodbye (2015)
- House on Sunset Lake (2016)
