= Daddy's Girls (novel) =

2006 novel by Tasmina Perry

- First edition
- Author: Tasmina Perry
- Language: English
- Genre: Drama
- Publisher: HarperCollins
- Publication date: 2006
- Publication place: United Kingdom
- Media type: Print (hardback & paperback)
- Pages: 612 pp
- ISBN: 978-0-00-722890-4
- OCLC: 76797889

Daddy's Girls is the 2006 debut novel by Tasmina Perry. The Independent described the novel as a "Shirley Conranesque retro romp". The novel follows four glamorous daughters whose father is murdered.
