= Chizzy Akudolu =

British actress and presenter (born 1973)

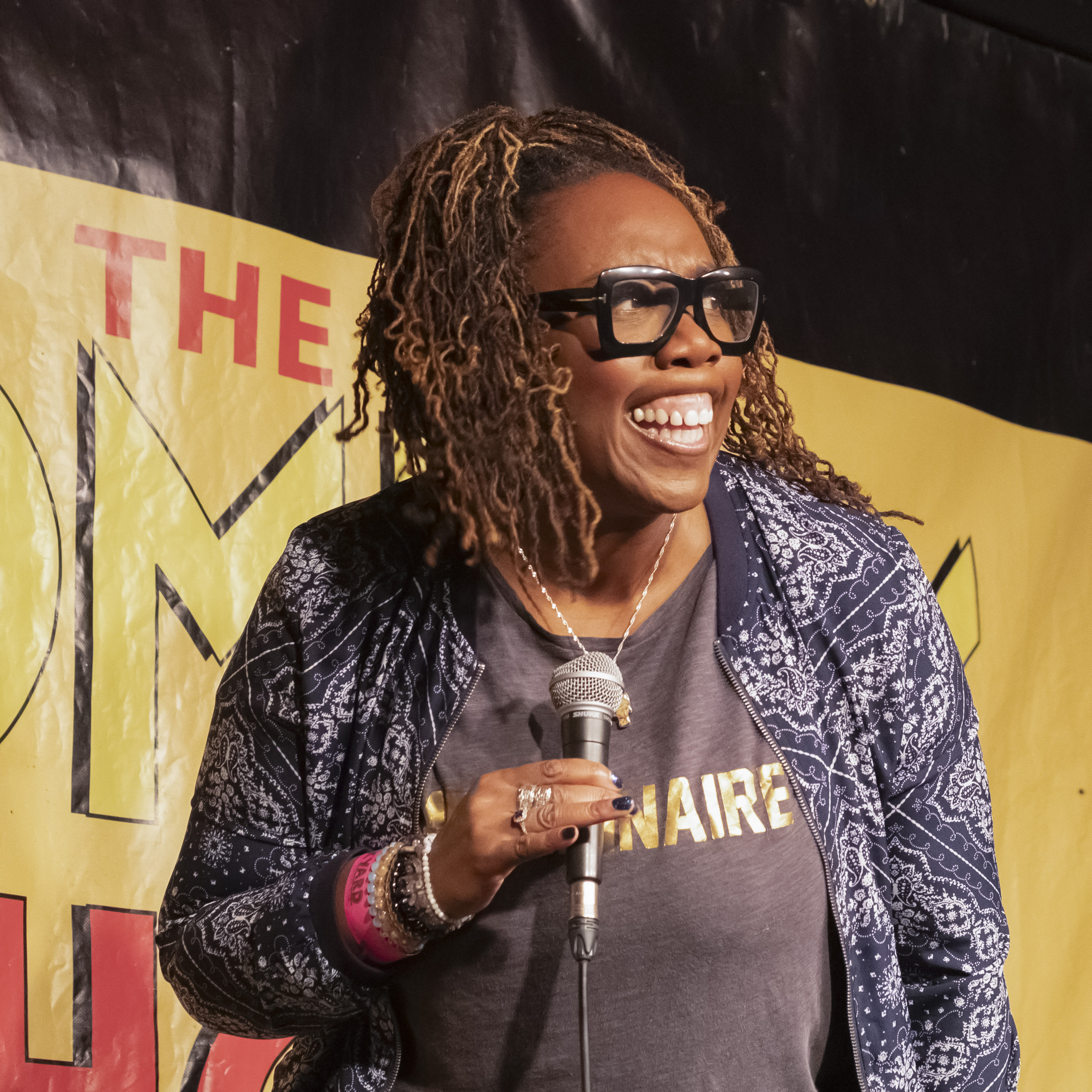
- Akudolu doing standup comedy in 2023
- Born: Andrea Chizoba Akudolu; 7 October 1973 (age 53); Harlesden, London, England
- Occupations: Actress and presenter
- Years active: 2002–present
- Known for: Holby City, Jinx, Dead Set

Andrea Chizoba "Chizzy" Akudolu (born 7 October 1973) is a British actress and presenter.

== Career ==
In 2002, Akudolu was one of eight new comedy performers who won the BBC Talent Initiative, The Urban Sketch Showcase. All eight performed a comedy sketch show in front of BBC casting directors and producers at the Tabernacle Theatre in Notting Hill. Her first television appearance was in the BBC sitcom 15 Storeys High. This was followed by a small role in EastEnders. She continued to work for the BBC in her first children's series called Stupid! and Roman's Empire. Credits also include Green Wing and Dustbin Baby for Kindle Entertainment and as a caricature of herself in the mockumentary The Most Unromantic Man in the World. Akudolu also played series regular Miss Kanouti in The Complete Guide to Parenting. She has continued to work for CBBC in programmes such as Nuzzle and Scratch, Scoop and Gigglebiz.

In 2007, she toured with The Vagina Monologues for three months. In 2008, Akudolu played the housemate, Angel, in Dead Set, a zombie parody of Big Brother. In 2009, she had a guest role in Hollyoaks Later and starred in the CBBC show Jinx in the lead role as the unconventional Fairy Godmother, Cookie. In 2010 Akudolu appeared in The Increasingly Poor Decisions of Todd Margaret, Twenty Twelve, The Inbetweeners, and as a semi-regular in the Channel 4 comedy Campus.

Since May 2012, Akudolu has played the role of the surgeon Mo Effanga in Holby City. In 2017, it was announced that Akudolu was departing Holby City after five years. She was nominated and won the award for "Best Newcomer" at the Black International Film Festival and Music Video & Screen Awards. She has also won the Best Actress in the same year at BEFFTA Awards. She was nominated for the "Emerging Talent" award at the 8th Annual Screen Nation Awards.

In 2017, Akudolu took part in Let's Sing and Dance for Comic Relief with a duo from Casualty. The trio performed "Uptown Funk" by Bruno Mars and came second place. In 2017, she took part in the fifteenth series of Strictly Come Dancing on BBC One. She was the first celebrity to be eliminated after losing the dance-off to Brian Conley and Amy Dowden. Later that same year, Akudolu took part in The Weakest Link one-off celebrity episode for Children in Need. She was the strongest link in five out of the six rounds, and beat Rylan Clark-Neal in the final round to win, earning £1,130 for Children in Need, which the programme doubled.

2018 saw Akudolu compete on Richard Osman's House of Games, televised on BBC Two, alongside Tom Allen, Charlie Higson, and Kate Williams. Having won one of the episodes in her week, she returned for a House of Champions special along with Miles Jupp, Amol Rajan and Ellie Taylor, broadcast in 2020.

In January 2019, Akudolu played Butterfly Brown in Death in Paradise.

In 2022, Akudolu competed in Celebrity Hunted for Stand up to Cancer. She was caught third in the series, with her teammate Lisa Maffia caught shortly after her. She also made a guest appearance in ITV's sitcom Kate and Koji as Lisa.

In 2025, Akudolu was one of the judges of the 'Published Novel' category of the Comedy Women in Print Prize.

== Personal life ==
She has a brown belt in karate and is an experienced calligrapher. Her mother was a midwife.Her younger sister, Nneka Akudolu, is a lawyer and a King's Counsel.

== Filmography ==
Year	Show	Role	Notes
2004	15 Storeys High	Melinda	Episode: "Vince the Shirker"
2004	EastEnders	Mattie George	1 episode
2004	Stupid!	Various	Series regular
2006	Green Wing	Car Parking Attendant	1 episode
2006	The Complete Guide to Parenting	Miss Kanouti	Series regular
2007	Roman's Empire	Mummy	1 episode
2008	Nuzzle and Scratch	Whippety Whips Lady	Episode: "Ice Cream Van"
2008	Dead Set	Angel	Series regular
2008	Dustbin Baby	Railway Woman	Television film
2009	In the Loop	U.N Cleaner	Film
2009	Agent X	Alice	Television film
2009	Hollyoaks Later	Receptionist	
2009	Jinx	Cookie	Series regular
2009	Gigglebiz	Various	Series regular
2010	The Inbetweeners	Maggie	Episode: "Will's Dilemma"
2010	The Increasingly Poor Decisions of Todd Margaret	Shopper	
2011	Twenty Twelve	Jane Owen	
2011	Campus	Grace 2	Series regular
2011	Scoop	Lorraine	Episode: "Northenders"
2011	Mongrels	Office Worker	Episode: "Nelson and the Amazing Nuts"
2012	Silent Witness	Nurse	Episode: "And Then I Fell in Love"
2012–2017, 2018, 2022	Holby City	Mo Effanga	Series regular
2015	5 Minutes	Denise	
2016	Hood Documentary	Julie	
2016, 2020–	Sorry, I Didn't Know	Panelist	10 episodes
2017	Let's Sing and Dance for Comic Relief	Herself	
2017	Strictly Come Dancing	Herself	Series 15
2017, 2022	The Weakest Link	Herself	Children in Need special (2017)
2018	Shakespeare & Hathaway: Private Investigators	Sandra Kingly	Episode: "The Chameleon's Dish"
2018	Celebrity MasterChef	Herself	Eliminated
2018	Impossible Celebrities	Herself	
2018–2019	Loose Women	Herself	Panellist (20 episodes)
2018, 2020, 2026	Richard Osman's House of Games	Herself	
2019	Death in Paradise	Butterfly Brown	
2019	Glow Up: Britain's Next Make-Up Star	Herself	Guest star
2019	Hetty Feather	Mrs. Doughty	Christmas special
2020	County Lines	Sophie	
2020	Hapless	June Brady	
2020	Chef vs Cornershop	Host (5 episodes)	
2021	Too Close	The Squeak	
2021	Creating A Scene	Presenter	
2022	Celebrity Hunted	Herself / Fugitive	Caught 3rd in the series
2022	Kate and Koji	Lisa	Episode: "Koji's Date"
2022	Man vs. Bee	Judge	2 episodes
2023	Pointless Celebrities	Contestant	Series 16, episode 8
2023	Best Interests	Mercy	4 episodes
2023	Blankety Blank	Celebrity	
2024	Beyond Paradise	Reverend Kate	series 2, two episodes.
2024	Criminal Record	Jasmine Peters	3 episodes
2025	Beyond Paradise	Reverend Kate	Series 3, episode
