= Michael Thomson (actor) =

Scottish actor

- Born: Edinburgh, Scotland
- Occupation: Actor

Michael Thomson is a Scottish actor, best known for his portrayal of nurse and transplant coordinator Jonny Maconie in the medical drama Holby City.

== Early life and career ==
Thomson was born in Edinburgh, Scotland. When Thomson was a pupil at James Gillespie's High School, Janie McGill, his teacher, spotted his acting potential and told his mother that he could have a future as an actor. Thomson went to the National Youth Theatre in London when he was young. Thomson trained at the London Academy of Music and Dramatic Art for three years. During his early career, he worked on building sites and as a charity mugger.

After Thomson finished the theatrical production A Round-Heeled Woman in the West End of London, he auditioned for the part of Jonny Maconie on Holby City. Two auditions were held and he got the role. Thomson made his first appearance on Holby City on 15 May 2012. Thomson underwent research for the role, including taking a tour of a hospital and meeting patients there. On 26 November 2012 he appeared on Lorraine, talking to Lorraine Kelly about a storyline in Holby City.

== Personal life ==
Thomson is in a relationship with Natasha Rickman, an actress who graduated from the Royal Academy of Dramatic Art. He has four brothers and one sister.

== Filmography ==
=== Television and film ===
Year	Title	Role
2012-2015	Holby City	Jonny Maconie
2015	Retribution	Michael
2015	Lady M	Brad
2015	My Mother the Monster	Lawyer
2016	Midsomer Murders - "Harvest of Souls"	Niall Deeley

=== Theatre ===
Production	Role	Director	Ref(s)
Wagstaffe the Wind-Up Boy	Wagstaffe	Janice Dunn	
Accidental Death of an Anarchist	The Maniac	Gari Jones	
Iph ...	Achillius	Sue Lefton	
Journey's End	Mason	Tony Casement	
Habeas Corpus	Dennis Wicksteed	Janice Dunn	
Coriolanus	N/A	N/A	
Of Mice and Men	Curley	Nikolai Foster	
The Resistible Rise of Arturo Ui	Bowl/Inna/Hook	Janice Dunn	
Three Sisters	Fedotik	David Hunt	
The Crucible	Proctor	Penny Churns	
Spring Awakening	Ernst	Gadi Roll	
Romeo and Juliet	Benvolio	Jeff Gould	
Mary Rose	Cameron	Richard Baron	
Love Play	N/A	Fiona Buffini	
Amy's View	Toby Cole	Natalie Wilson	
Beyond the Horizon	Andy	Laurie Sansom	
Spring Storm	Dick	Laurie Sansom	
The Syndicate	Nait	Sean Mathias	
A Round-Heeled Woman	Andy/Graham/Dance teacher	Jane Prowse	
The Driver's Seat	Richard	Laurie Sansom	
