= Holby City series 18 =

Eighteenth series of the British medical drama television series airing 2015

Holby City
- Series 18
- No. of episodes: 52

Release
- Original network: BBC One; BBC One HD
- Original release: 13 October 2015 – 4 October 2016

Series chronology
- ← Previous; Series 17 Next → Series 19

The eighteenth series of the British medical drama television series Holby City commenced airing in the United Kingdom on 13 October 2015, and concluded on 4 October 2016. The series consists of 52 episodes. Oliver Kent continues his position as the show's executive producer, while Simon Harper serves as the series producer. Sixteen cast members reprised their roles from the previous series, while several recurring characters, and numerous guest stars feature in the series. Four actors depart during the series and two cast members reprise their roles after taking breaks in the previous series. Jemma Redgrave appeared in the series between February and September 2016 as general surgeon Bernie Wolfe. Jason Robertson joined the semi-regular cast in February 2016 as Jason Haynes, and two new cast members joined the serial in summer 2016: Marc Elliott as registrar Isaac Mayfield and Lucinda Dryzek as F1 doctor Jasmine Burrows.

Several crossover events with Holby City's sister show Casualty occurred during the series. Four Holby City cast members appeared in Casualty during the series, while five Casualty actors starred in Holby City during the series, including former Holby City actress Amanda Mealing. Several storylines featured in the series with on-off relationships becoming a common theme throughout. One storyline sees CT1 doctor Dominic Copeland (David Ames) attacked by an aggressive partner, who is married. A prominent storyline in the series is CT2 doctor Arthur Digby's (Rob Ostlere) melanoma diagnosis, which proves to be terminal. Ostlere raised awareness for the illness off-screen too, and the story concluded in "I'll Walk You Home", which features Ostlere's departure.

Series 18 of Holby City attracted 4.5 million viewers on average with three episodes failing to reach the top 30 rated programmes of the week. During the series, Holby City was nominated for several awards, including a nomination at the 2016 British Academy Television Awards and the 2016 Broadcast Awards. Four cast members and three storylines were nominated at the 2016 Inside Soap Awards, and Ostlere won the "Best Drama Star" accolade. The serial also received a positive reaction to the characters and storylines with a domestic abuse storyline featured in the series prompting 177 calls to the BBC Action Line and 2,032 visits to the BBC Action Line's website.

== Episodes ==
No. overall	No. in series	Title	Directed by	Written by	Original release date	Viewers (millions)
788	1	"The Sticky Mess of Being"	Eddy Marshall	Kate Verghese	13 October 2015	4.62
Mo Effanga (Chizzy Akudolu), a registrar of cardiothoracic surgery, decides to focus on her career following a dramatic year, but her personal life once again interferes with her work life when her friend Sorcia Winters (Susannah Corbett), her partner Brett Jones (John Lightbody) and Mo's surrogate son William Winters (Jackson Allison) are admitted after a car accident. Brett is placed into an induced coma, while Mo is forced to operate on a seriously ill Sorcia. Mo promises Sorcia that if anything happens to her, she will become William's guardian, and Sorcia dies in surgery. Cara Martinez (Niamh Walsh) is a staff nurse who treats octogenarian Dora Greenwood (Rosalind Knight) who believes a guardian angel saved her from drowning. Cara faces difficulty when she tries to track down Dora's saviour. Meanwhile, Jesse Law (Don Gilet), a consultant anaesthetist, shadows Sacha Levy (Bob Barrett), a registrar general surgeon, for the day after claiming that he wants to observe a surgeon, which leads Guy Self (John Michie), a consultant neurosurgeon, to wonder what Jesse's motives are.
789	2	"Cover Up"	Eddy Marshall	Joe Ainsworth	20 October 2015	4.61
Cara is shocked when Nicole Brady (Sarah Ridgeway), who is pregnant by Cara's husband Jed Martinez (Jody Latham), is admitted onto the Acute Assessment Unit (AAU) in labour. Jed and Nicole's husband, Sean Brady (Oliver Walker), arrive on the ward where Sean realises the baby cannot be his. Cara helps Nicole escape Sean. Mo struggles to care for William so cardiothoracic registrar Oliver Valentine (James Anderson) and F2 doctor Zosia March (Camilla Arfwedson) offer to help her. Still struggling following the events of the bombing (see "An Eye for an Eye"), Guy tries to avoid operating in theatre, while being shadowed by Henrik Hanssen (Guy Henry), the hospital's chief executive officer. After blanking in theatre, Guy goes on a sabbatical.
790	3	"Calling Time"	Richard Platt	Nessah Muthy and Julia Gilbert	27 October 2015	4.74
Sean returns to the hospital looking for Nicole and warns Cara. Jed, who is an undercover police officer working to arrest Sean, arrives after Cara calls him. He physically attacks registrar general surgeon Raf di Lucca (Joe McFadden) after he refers to Jed by his real name. Cara feels responsible for the attack and promises to stay away from Raf. After struggling to come to terms with the fact she will have to return William, Mo gives a patient false hope. Sacha struggles with his confidence when an optimistic Jesse joins the team on Keller ward, although he soon discovers that Jesse has little experience.
791	4	"What it Takes"	Richard Platt	Michelle Lipton	3 November 2015	4.74
CT2 doctor Arthur Digby (Rob Ostlere) returns to work after a leave of absence to treat his general anxiety disorder. He returns with a new look and is disappointed to discover his relationship with former mentee, F1 doctor Morven Shreve (Eleanor Fanyinka), is strained. Arthur mends his relationship with Morven. Guy is asked to consult on the surgery of innovations consultant Patsy Brassvine's (Caroline Lee-Johnson) son, who has a neurological condition. When he fails to find another surgeon to perform the operation, Guy is forced to perform surgery and after a positive result, Patsy offers to fund the neurosurgical unit that Guy wants to build. Mo sets up various challenges for Zosia to overcome.
792	5	"Left Behind"	David Innes Edwards	Rebecca Wojciechowski	10 November 2015	4.74
Mo is feeling positive as she prepares to return William to Brett. However, she suffers a setback when Brett decides Sorcia's mother, Vivienne Winters (Karen Archer), would be best to care for William. After overhearing Vivienne insisting that she has no further contact with William, Mo takes William and flees. They go to the bus station, which Mo's friend Derwood "Mr T" Thompson (Ben Hull) realises and persuades Mo to return William. Sacha is being interviewed for the position of consultant general surgeon. When Patsy coerces his patient Lee Cannon (Jamie Nichols) into having keyhole instead of open surgery, resulting in complications and two further operations, Sacha warns Hanssen and the board that his patient care will always be his first priority, turning down the promotion. Deputy CEO and consultant general surgeon Serena Campbell (Catherine Russell) has a difficult day: her former husband Edward Campbell (Aden Gillett) invites her to his wedding, and she spends the shift treating a hysterical Arthur who has a toy soldier stuck in his arm.
793	6	"Beneath the Cover"	David Innes Edwards	Lindsay Williams	17 November 2015	3.64 (Note: Not reported in the weekly top 30 programmes for BBC One, so an overnight viewing figure is provided instead.)
Nicole and Tom, her baby, are admitted onto the AAU, having been hiding from Sean. When Jed abandons them and Sean arrives at the hospital, wanting to know who Tom's father is, Cara decides to protect them. Sean realises that Jed is Tom's father and attacks him until Cara knocks him unconscious. Cara tells Nicole that Jed is her husband and Nicole warns Cara that Jed is the same as Sean so Cara ends her marriage to Jed. Lee is readmitted onto Keller ward for surgery, which Jesse and F2 doctor Dominic "Dom" Copeland (David Ames) compete to be part of. While trying to impress Lee, Dom develops an attraction to him. After attending a salsa class for single people, Mo feels deflated and begins to realise that she would like to have a baby.
794	7	"A Delicate Truth"	Louise Hooper	Katie Douglas	24 November 2015	4.25
Consultant cardiothoracic surgeon Jac Naylor (Rosie Marcel) returns to the hospital after taking maternity leave and clashes with Guy over the use of beds on Darwin ward. She also challenges Oliver, who is keen to prove himself to Jac by inviting her to an operation he is leading. The operation faces complications and Guy has to take over, annoying Jac. Morven and Arthur clash over the treatment of terminally ill patient, Beth Musgrove (Jenny Lee), whose husband, Hugh Musgrove (Keith Barron), struggles to accept she is dying. Hanssen decides that Arthur is correct and Beth asks Morven to help Hugh come to terms with her illness, which she does. Dom and Lee share a hug when Lee learns that he has the all-clear.
795	8	"In Which We Serve"	Louise Hooper	Ed Sellek	1 December 2015	4.35
Zosia worries about her place on Darwin ward when she notices a question mark above her name in Jac's office, and tries to impress Jac by advising her patient to undergo a riskier operation. Jac agrees to oversee Zosia performing the operation and Zosia impresses Jac in surgery. Zosia later notices the question mark has been removed. Arthur and Morven bond over Hugh when he is admitted onto the AAU and later go for a drink together. Dom wants to ask Lee on a date before he leaves the hospital; later, Lee kisses Dom. Adele Effanga (Petra Letang) moves from Darwin ward to Keller ward as a healthcare assistant, and agency nurse Fran Reynolds (Carli Norris) spends a shift working on Darwin ward.
796	9	"Skin and Blister"	James Larkin	Joe Ainsworth and Kate Verghese	8 December 2015	4.19
Jac and Fran clash over Jac's bedside manner towards patient Seymour Orson (Daniel Hall). Fran encourages Jac to be softer with Seymour, which she ignores. When Seymour decides to leave, Jac decides not to fight his decision, irritating Fran, who realises that Seymour has autism. Seymour is rushed into surgery, but Jac is removed from his operation by Hanssen, who informs her that Fran has filed a complaint against her. A depressed Cara is cheered up by Raf and the AAU ward manager Adrian "Fletch" Fletcher (Alex Walkinshaw) who tries matchmaking her with a patient. Jesse wants to assist Hanssen on an operation, but is shocked to discover that the patient is the sister of the patient he last performed surgery on. After much deliberation, he acts as the anaesthetist and helps Hanssen, who is pleased with Jesse's surgical work.
797	10	"Bad Blood, Fake Snow"	James Larkin	Nick Fisher	15 December 2015	4.51
Fran wants to be heard by Hanssen and hands him a file containing Jac's mortality rates. Fran presents the mortality rates to the sister of Jac's patient, who is undergoing complex surgery, in a bid to annoy Jac. Jac tries having Fran transferred to another ward, but when that fails, Jac goads Fran into punching her. Fran is escorted from the premises. Dom is devastated to discover that Lee is a conman and has left him, taking Dom's money and possessions, as well as Arthur's grandfather's war medals. Serena is upset when her daughter, Elinor Campbell (Amy McCallum), cancels their plans to celebrate Christmas together. Serena decides to invite Raf, Cara, Fletch and his children to celebrate Christmas with her.
798	11	"Blue Christmas"	Karl Neilson	Julia Gilbert	22 December 2015	4.54
Fran returns to the hospital and admits herself as a patient. She steals prescription drugs so Jac will notice her, but her plan fails. Fran then takes Jac's daughter, Emma Naylor-Maconie (Darcey Burke), from the hospital crèche to the hospital roof, which attracts Jac's attention. Fran reveals that she and Jac lived in the same care home as children, where Fran was abused. Fran blames Jac for not stopping the abuse and Jac softens towards Fran. After returning Emma, Fran falls from the hospital roof; Jac saves her life in surgery. Despite initially struggling, Sacha manages to treat a former classmate who bullied him. Sacha is then promoted to consultant and celebrates by proposing to girlfriend, Essie Harrison (Kaye Wragg). Oliver and Zosia kiss, while Serena tries to improve the choir composed of the AAU staff. Arthur helps Morven with a difficult patient and they share a kiss, and Hanssen dresses as Santa Claus for the children at the hospital crèche.
799	12	"Beginnings"	Karl Neilson	Andy Bayliss	29 December 2015	4.23
Consultant general surgeon Ric Griffin (Hugh Quarshie) returns from his break in Australia and is surprised to find he is being placed on Keller ward and working with Adele. When Adele makes an incorrect conclusion about a patient, Ric tells her off but is forced to explain himself to Hanssen when he questions his behaviour. Ric apologises to Adele and offers to mentor her for her nursing training. Serena is shocked when her former boyfriend, detective Robbie Medcalf (Mark Healy), arrives onto the AAU to question one of Serena's patients. Serena initially wants him to leave, but later forgives him and goes on a date with him. Mo focuses on finding a sperm donor and Mr T offers to become her donor, which, after much deliberation, Mo agrees to.
800	13	"Young Hearts, Run Free"	Matthew Evans	Johanne McAndrew and Elliot Hope	5 January 2016	4.82
Hanssen sends Arthur, Morven and Dom to an outdoor pursuit centre run by Morven's father, Austin Shreve (Clinton Blake). Morven wants to win so she can impress Austin and Arthur agrees to help, although he feels under pressure from Austin. Dom explains his relationship problems and agrees to a date with a medical student, while Morven and Arthur kiss after succeeding at the challenge. Zosia is hurt when Oliver pretends that their kiss was meaningless, unaware that Oliver is still grieving for his dead wife, Tara Lo (Jing Lusi). Jac offers Zosia an immediate research position in Edinburgh and Oliver encourages her to accept. Zosia claims that Oliver is emotionless and prepares to leave Holby, so Oliver tells Zosia that he wants her to stay; they kiss. Mr T worries that he will not be good enough for Mo.
801	14	"The Hope That Kills"	Jennie Darnell	Patrick Homes	12 January 2016	5.10
A television crew are filming Guy and his team for a documentary following neurosurgery. It emerges that Guy is friends with Sam Ahmed (Mina Anwar), the deputy manager of the hospital café. She is keen to tell the crew how great Guy is, although when Guy tries to prove himself to the television crew, he puts Sam in danger. Arthur is disappointed when Morven suggests they keep their relationship a secret at work. They become frustrated when Arthur has to give Morven an honest appraisal and Arthur prepares to tell Serena until she reveals that she hates relationships in the workplace. After treating a patient who has gone to extreme lengths to impress his girlfriend, Arthur declares his love for Morven in front of the ward. Serena is impressed by Arthur's bravery. Essie thinks she may be pregnant and takes a pregnancy test, which is negative.
802	15	"Sins of Our Fathers"	Jennie Darnell	Kit Lambert	19 January 2016	4.82
Guy tries to regain his former position of CEO of the hospital from Hanssen and tries finding people to support him. Hanssen tells Jac and Guy that they have to compete for funding and he decides to assign funding to Jac's research with former hospital employee Elliot Hope (Paul Bradley). Hanssen sends Fletch home to be with his children on the first anniversary of the death of his wife, Natalie Fletcher (Claire Cage). Hanssen discovers a homeless man outside the hospital who reminds him of his family in Sweden and considers returning there. Arthur is told he can no longer be Morven's mentor so decides to set himself a new challenge by moving back to Keller ward. Essie worries about fitting into Sacha's Jewish family because her grandfather was a Nazi, but is pleased when they say she is better than Sacha's former wife, Chrissie Williams (Tina Hobley).
803	16	"Kiss and Tell"	Claire Winyard	Jeff Povey	26 January 2016	4.53
Serena is given a shoebox containing documentation belonging to her dead mother, Adrienne McKinnie (Sandra Voe); the documentation states that Adrienne has another daughter. Mo takes a pregnancy test, which is negative. When Mr T finds out, he is upset; Mo reminds him that is just an agreement, but Mr T wants to be involved in the whole process. Mr T suggests that he and Mo kiss to determine whether they have any feelings for each other and they agree that there are no romantic feelings, despite both knowing this is not true. Arthur returns to working on Keller ward; his first patient is Austin, who is diagnosed with a deadly parasite he contratacted in Panama. Arthur supports Austin when he starts coughing up blood.
804	17	"Serenity"	Claire Winyard	Michelle Lipton	2 February 2016	4.63
Army Major Bernie Wolfe (Jemma Redgrave) is admitted onto Darwin ward, where she is treated by Guy and Oliver, who are clashing over Zosia's birthday and Bernie's treatment. Bernie tells them to operate on her simultaneously and she is visited by her husband, Marcus Dunn (Andrew Scarborough), who is delighted that she is back from the Army. Bernie reveals that she has been offered a ten-year contract with the Army so Marcus tells her to choose between the Army and her family; Bernie chooses her family and notices a job at the hospital. Dom accidentally knocks Ric's wing mirror from his car and lies about his actions. Ric discovers the truth, but is impressed with how Dom handles a difficult patient so does not confront Dom. Robbie encourages Serena to let him find her sister and after deliberation, Serena agrees. She discovers that her sister, Majorie Haynes, died two years previously, but has a son, Jason Haynes (Jules Robertson).
805	18	"A Partnership, Literally"	Sue Dunderdale	Andy Bayliss	9 February 2016	4.90
Dom treats a pregnant woman, Alison Jones (Elizabeth Cadwallader), whose husband is revealed to be Lee. Dom is shocked by Lee's return and that he is married, and decides to warn Alison. She reveals that she knows about Lee's infidelity and ends their marriage. Lee blames Dom and confronts him; Lee attacks Dom with a knife, but Dom ends up stabbing Lee. Lee does not die and Dom is arrested. Serena emails Jason, asking to meet him, and he arrives on the AAU. Jason reveals that he has Asperger syndrome and Serena tries to talk to him, but keeps getting distracted. When Jason becomes disturbed by Serena's busy schedule, he decides that he does not want her as his aunt, although Serena persuades Jason that she is good. Jason's carer, Allan Coalville (Geoffrey Lumb), warns Serena that Jason is vulnerable. Zosia is impressed by Bernie and encourages her to apply for the consultant general surgeon position on Keller ward. Bernie had to go into quarantine when doctors suspected she may have tuberculosis.
806	19	"All That Glitters"	Sue Dunderdale	Sue Mooney	16 February 2016	4.84
Mo is unenthusiastic about finding a sperm donor. While treating Amy Stirling (Nicole Arumugam), a mother to multiple children, she gets an insight to what motherhood could be like. Mo agrees to help Amy with her son's school project, which involves looking after the school hamster. When the hamster goes missing in the hospital, Mo has to find it. She decides to leave her search for a sperm donor. Lee files a complaint against Dom for stabbing him. Ric struggles to comprehend the incident and Sacha worries about him. When it is revealed that Austin's liver disease has progressed, Morven volunteers to be a donor. When she discovers that she is not a match for Austin, Arthur volunteers to donate part of his liver.
807	20	"All Fall Down"	Dermot Boyd	Patrick Homes	23 February 2016	4.77
While testing Arthur as Austin's liver donor, Essie discovers an irregular mole on his back. Arthur is disinterested and is delighted to discover he is a match for Austin; he tells Morven. Essie is worried and asks Hanssen; he examines Arthur and orders it to be removed for testing. Arthur becomes scared and removes his offer to be Austin's donor without telling Morven why. Bernie arrives for her first day on Keller ward, but works on Darwin ward when a trauma patient is admitted. After breaking hospital policy, Bernie clashes with Hanssen, who wonders whether she is ready to be working in a hospital. However, Bernie makes a good impression on Jac. Allan is admitted onto the AAU after being injured, bringing Jason with him. Serena decides to integrate Jason into her family by introducing him to Elinor.
808	21	"One Under"	Dermot Boyd	Kate Verghese	1 March 2016	4.85
Arthur awaits his test results, but avoids telling Morven about his problems. Arthur treats a teenager who has been hit by a train; the teenager dies and Arthur struggles to accept it. Morven thinks that Arthur is having an affair so Arthur tells her about his test. He then receives the news that the cancer has not spread. Guy asks Adele to work in neurosurgery for the day. Despite leaving him in a bad position in theatre, Guy offers Adele a permanent position in neurosurgery. Adele accepts the offer on the condition that she and Guy are equal. Morven organises a charity auction, where Serena's friend, Sian Kors (Andrée Bernard), bids £500 to go on a date with Raf. Sian decides to take Raf to the opera; Cara encourages this, despite their feelings for each other. Raf later tells Cara that Sian noticed he was more interested in someone else; Cara pretends not to know who he is referencing to and rejects him.
809	22	"On the Ropes"	Louise Hooper	Julia Gilbert	8 March 2016	5.05
Ric's gym partner Kit McNeil (Ade Haastrup) is admitted onto Keller ward, where he is treated by Dom. Kit becomes aggressive and scares Dom; Ric realises that Dom is disturbed by Lee's attack. Later, Dom fails to attend Kit's surgery and Ric finds him crying; he warns Dom that he cannot let Lee win. Bernie clashes with Ric when she operates on his patient without his knowledge. Ric fears he is losing control when he struggles to save his patient. Mo is disappointed to find out she has lost the consultant cardiothoracic surgeon position to Sir Dennis Hopkins-Clarke (Rupert Frazer), who knows Jac. Serena is delighted with her relationship with Robbie, but feels uncomfortable about introducing Jason to Robbie; she is pleased when Robbie and Jason get along well.
810	23	"Where We Belong"	Louise Hooper	Katie Douglas	15 March 2016	4.86
Oliver is surprised when his former girlfriend, Melissa Peters (Faye McKeever), is admitted onto Darwin ward. Melissa claims that Oliver is the father of her unborn child, which Oliver tries to keep a secret. Melissa tells Zosia, leaving her devastated and her relationship with Oliver strained. However, Oliver later discovers evidence that proves he is not the father of Melissa's child. Bernie realises she needs to improve her bedside manner after a patient makes a formal complaint against her due to her brash personality. Cara advertises for a flatmate and Morven offers to fill the position. Cara is unsure, but after receiving other poor offers, she accepts.
811	24	"Who You Are"	Jamie Annett	Patrick Homes	22 March 2016	4.81
It is Morven's 25th birthday and Austin is admitted onto the AAU. Morven continues to work, despite being warned that she will lose concentration; she changes her mind when she fails to spot an aneurysm. Morven ends her relationship with Arthur after deciding to focus on Austin, but Arthur comforts her when he discovers her crying. Later, in the hospital gardens, Morven proposes to Arthur and he accepts. Ric argues with a pregnant patient when she decides to abort their baby so she can keep her gastric band. Ric confides in Jesse about his difficult relationship with his daughter, Jess Griffin (Verona Joseph), but regrets it. Jesse later discovers he is being transferred to the AAU at Ric's request. Mo is suspicious of Sir Dennis when she notices his poor surgical skills. Jac, Oliver and Zosia are unconcerned, but Mo decides to confront Sir Dennis.
812	25	"A Friend in Need"	Jamie Annett	Rebecca Wojciechowski	29 March 2016	4.39
Arthur starts coughing blood so asks Dom to examine him. A CT scan confirms that Arthur's cancer has returned; he has secondary tumours on his lungs. Arthur asks Dom to keep the news private, but when he flees from surgery, Arthur meets Morven and tells her the news. Morven reassures Arthur that they will fight the cancer together. Adele is devastated when her friend, Linda Bradshaw (Denise Welch), is admitted with terminal cancer. She helps the palliative care team with Linda's care, leading her to realise that she is not happy and wants to train in palliative care. Guy encourages her to follow her ambitions so Adele leaves Holby. After receiving news about Jed's sentencing, Cara decides to pursue a new relationship and kisses Raf. However, Cara realises that she is not ready for a relationship and applies for a position on Darwin ward.
813	26	"Handle With Care"	David Innes Edwards	Tony Higgins	5 April 2016	4.63
Allan is admitted onto the AAU, where he is diagnosed with a ministroke. Serena agrees that Jason can stay with her while Allan recovers. When Hanssen learns that Serena has prioritised Allan's operation over her elective surgeries, he questions whether she is neglecting her professional life. Dom is being overly protective of Arthur and when he discovers that their patient had cancer, Dom decides to hide this from Arthur. However, Dom realises that he cannot lie to Arthur and he should not act differently around him because he has cancer. Cara is challenged by Jac on Darwin ward. She also notices that Sir Dennis is lying about his identity and agrees with Mo about him. Jesse learns that his mother has died so Mo drives him to London, where she lived.
814	27	"Dark Night of the Soul"	David Innes Edwards	Michelle Lipton	12 April 2016	4.89
Following Jesse's mother's funeral, Jesse's father, Thomas Law (Louis Mahoney), and Mo's aunt, Ina Effanga (Angela Wynter), are admitted into the hospital. Jesse avoids spending time with Thomas as their relationship is strained. Ina signs a do not resuscitate order at Sir Dennis' encouragement. When Sir Dennis accidentally overdoses Ina, Mo and Jesse debate whether to perform surgery on her. When Ina tells Jesse that she withdraws the DNR, they perform life-saving surgery on her. Jesse is told that he will be investigated as there is no evidence that Ina withdrew her DNR, but Jesse quits and leaves Holby after learning that Thomas feels that he has nothing to live for. Ric and Bernie treat a patient with a broken penis and clash on how to treat him. Ric and the patient bond over boxing and playing cards, but when Bernie encourages Ric to demonstrate his boxing skills, he accidentally punches Hanssen.
815	28	"Prioritise the Heart"	Steve Brett	Julia Gilbert	19 April 2016	4.31
Bernie is shocked when her former Army colleague, anaesthetist Alex Dawson (Heather Peace), arrives at the hospital for a locum shift. It emerges that Bernie and Alex had an affair, which ended when Bernie moved to Holby. Dom sees them kissing; he encourages Bernie to tell her husband the truth, which she decides to do. Alex leaves after deciding that Bernie needs to sort her life out before beginning a relationship. It is Mo's first day as a consultant cardiothoracic surgeon, while Mr T worries that his department funding may be cut. Mo and Mr T work together on a patient and Mr T voices his opinion after realising he is not being treated equally by Mo, making her attracted to him. Mr T discovers that Hanssen has assigned more funding to his department. Serena is planning to move in with Robbie, who is retiring from the police force. Jason has a girlfriend, Lola Winston (Megan Jones), but Serena realises that Lola is exploiting Jason when she is caught shoplifting. Serena invites Jason to live with her, which annoys Robbie, who ends their relationship. Arthur books a trip to Verona for him and Morven.
816	29	"Out of Sight Out of Mind"	Steve Brett	Johanne McAndrew and Elliot Hope	26 April 2016	4.44
Austin is admitted into the hospital and Arthur insists on treating him, despite being tired. Austin needs a liver transplant urgently. While treating Austin, Arthur nearly faints, but warns Dom not to tell Morven. Morven is shocked when her brother, AJ Shreve (Petrice Jones), reveals that he is a match for Austin but does not want to be operated on. Arthur is delighted when a donor for Austin is found. Zosia is struggling with Arthur's cancer so focuses her efforts on saving her patient's life. She suggests that her patient could be a candidate for Jac's balloon sent project, although Mo thinks it is a bad idea. In theatre, the patient dies, and Mo tells Zosia that it will help the future of the project. Bernie is working on the AAU, where she receives her divorce papers. Serena advises Bernie on how to deal with her divorce.
817	30	"The Coward's Way"	Karl Neilson	Kate Verghese	3 May 2016	4.42
Arthur undergoes chemotherapy and Zosia reluctantly sits with him. Zosia is detached from Oliver while working, so he tells her that she is "cold". Zosia freezes in theatre when she sees a tumour so Oliver takes over. When Oliver suggests that she is struggling with Arthur's cancer, Zosia becomes agitated and says that she is fine. She later admits to Oliver that she is struggling to cope. Fletch tries to impress consultant psychiatrist Naomi Palmer (Lorna Brown) and asks her on a date, presuming that his flatmate, Raf, will be able to look after his children. Raf arrives to work with Fletch's son, Mikey Fletcher (Kai O'Loughlin). Raf is annoyed that Fletch is taking him for granted and they bicker; Fletch realises how much he relies on Raf and decides against a date with Naomi. Marcus is working on Keller ward as a locum, alongside Bernie, who tries to keep her affair a secret from him. She texts the wrong person when asking Dom to keep her secret; the person who receives her message exposes the truth, angering Marcus and upsetting Serena.
818	31	"It Tolls for Thee"	Karl Neilson	Joe Ainsworth	10 May 2016	4.33
Arthur and Morven decide to marry in the hospital chapel; they are delighted when Austin gives his blessing. Arthur is told that his cancer has spread and is terminal, so they decide to cancel the wedding. They later change their mind and marry, before celebrating in the local bar, Albie's. Mo and Mr T have sex after he announces he has been offered a job in Sweden; afterwards, he rejects the job. Mo tells Mr T that they had sex because he was leaving, devastating him. He decides to leave, calling Mo hurtful. Mo quickly realises that she is making a mistake and goes to the airport to convince Mr T to stay; she misses his flight and does not get to speak to him. Serena's laptop, containing patient files, is stolen from her car; the files are leaked onto the internet and Serena is suspended. Serena and Bernie reunite.
819	32	"Running Out"	Matthew Evans	Wendy Granditer	17 May 2016	4.28
Zosia, a bipolar disorder sufferer, is shocked when a newspaper reports that a doctor at the hospital is suffering with bipolar. Zosia's patient, Alex Lambert (Jack Hawkins), questions her and when her name is leaked online, she confronts Alex. Zosia's father, Guy, warns Oliver that Zosia is not coping, so Oliver tells Mo that Zosia is not fit to assist in surgery; Mo stops Zosia from assisting and when she discovers that Oliver spoke to Mo, Zosia ends their relationship. Serena returns from her suspension and is surprised to see Bernie working on the AAU. When she discovers that Bernie has been sent to oversee the AAU, Serena resigns; while packing her belongings, Serena realises that the new arrangement could be beneficial for her and retracts her resignation. Dominic takes Arthur to visit his parents to inform them of his marriage and terminal cancer.
820	33	"When I Grow Up"	Matthew Evans	Martin Jameson	24 May 2016	3.84
Oliver tries to reunite with Zosia, but she rejects him. They clash while working on a patient and Cara encourages Oliver to apologise, but Zosia does not accept his apology. Defalted, Oliver goes to Albie's with Cara; they kiss as Zosia enters the bar. She berates Oliver for kissing Cara, which Raf overhears. Hanssen works on Keller ward as a surgeon so Arthur decides to prove himself as a medic. Arthur struggles to treat a teenage girl with terminal cancer and resigns at the end of his shift. Arthur later finds a present from Hanssen in his locker: a stethoscope with his name engraved, similar to Hanssen's stethoscope. Raf develops romantic feelings for Naomi, but before he can mention them, Fletch asks Naomi on a date.
821	34	"The Sky Is Falling"	Paulette Randall	Andy Bayliss	31 May 2016	4.14
Dom is shocked when a heavily pregnant Alison is admitted onto Keller ward. He discovers that she needs an urgent operation, but she does not care about herself or her child. Alison is taken into surgery, where her baby son is prematurely born. Later, she asks Dom to visit Lee in prison with her, angering Dom, who warns her not to focus on the past. Arthur is admitted onto Darwin ward with breathing difficulties. Zosia believes that Arthur is an ideal candidate for Jac's prototype stent; he agrees to the surgery and it is successful. Jason arrives at the hospital wanting a job; Bernie encourages him, but Serena is wary. Bernie also warns Serena not to be overprotective of Morven, but Serena admits that she feels unable to help Arthur.
822	35	"I'll Walk You Home"	Paulette Randall	Andy Bayliss	7 June 2016	4.52
Arthur and Morven decide to go travelling, upsetting Dom; he and Arthur argue over his decision. Dom realises he is being selfish and hands Arthur his grandfather's war medals. Arthur decides to stay in Holby. Zosia tries to prove herself to Jac, but she accuses Zosia of giving Arthur the stent to advance her own career; Jac and Zosia argue. Oliver and Cara apologise for kissing and Zosia sees Oliver with a picture of Tara. Staff members, including emergency department (ED) registrar Ethan Hardy (George Rainsford), perform a dance routine for Arthur. Arthur's former mentor, Antoine Malick (Jimmy Akingbola), wishes him well via a video call. While speaking to Hanssen, Arthur's stent bursts and he collapses; Sacha and Ric try to operate on him, but his cancer is inoperable. Unconscious, Arthur has visions of Morven, Dom, Zosia and his friend, Chantelle Lane (Lauren Drummond). After Morven tells him that she loves him, Arthur dies surrounded by his friends. When she learns the news, Zosia breaks down and is comforted by Jac.
823	36	"Missing You Already"	Nigel Douglas	Joe Ainsworth	16 June 2016	4.31
It is Arthur's funeral, but the hospital's staff are called to the hospital during the service. Dom bonds with his patient, Marisa Walker (Alice O'Connell), and agrees to operate on her when she refuses to let anyone else do so. Dom's mother, Carole Copeland (Julia Deakin), arrives at the hospital to check on Dom. In theatre, Dom freezes so Sacha takes charge; afterwards, Dom confronts Sacha for undermining him. On the ward, Dom has an outburst so Hanssen tells him to take time off to grieve for Arthur. Bernie uses her military experience to organise the chaos of AAU, impressing Serena, who recommends her protocol to Hanssen. Oliver tries to comfort Zosia following Arthur's death, but she rejects him. Morven also grieves for Arthur.
824	37	"The Lone Ranger"	Nigel Douglas	Atiha Sen Gupta and Katie Douglas	23 June 2016	4.05
Dom is shocked when Isaac Mayfield (Marc Elliott), the man that he had a one-night stand with, arrives on Keller ward as the new registrar general surgeon. Dom dislikes working with Isaac, but Isaac finds the situation funny. After noticing that Dom is struggling to grieve, Essie decides that Dom needs a bereavement counsellor. At the end of the shift, Dom and Isaac go home together. Jac prepares to launch her stent project, named the Digby Stent in Arthur's honour, but is furious to discover that a similar device has recently been launched in Berlin. Hanssen warns Jac not to continue with the operation, but she ignores him and successfully operates. Jac suspects that Guy is behind the leak. Raf helps Fletch create a birthday surprise for Naomi; she realises that Raf created the surprise and not Fletch. Cara leaves Holby; before leaving, she confronts Jac and shares an emotional goodbye with Raf and Morven.
825	38	"Another Day in Paradise – Part One"	Jennie Darnell	Nick Fisher	28 June 2016	4.42
Dom is intrigued when a clairvoyant is admitted onto Keller ward and passes on a message that Arthur wants his toy ship to be sailed. Hanssen then completes the building of the ship, before sailing it in a pond with Dom. He feels he can now grieve for Arthur and breaks down, being comforted by Hanssen. Fletch is upset when Naomi ends their relationship; Raf feels responsible for this and tries to hide his feelings for Naomi. However, Fletch spots them chatting and realises the truth. In the hospital car park, a patient's relative is set on fire and while running into the hospital, Jac and Oliver are sprayed with an unknown substance.
826	39	"Another Day in Paradise – Part Two"	Jennie Darnell	Nick Fisher	5 July 2016	4.10
Jac develops an allergic reaction after being sprayed, which stops her from operating. She asks Mo to replace her, annoying Oliver; when Mo falls ill during surgery, Oliver replaces her. Mo later tells Jac that she is pregnant. Oliver has to operate differently to plan when he faces complications, annoying Jac. After surgery, Oliver berates Jac, particularly about her parenting skills; Jac punches Oliver. Jac takes leave to spend time with Emma. Essie and Sacha have sex in their car, but Sacha suffers erectile dysfunction; he speaks to Ric about using Viagra. Naomi is working on the AAU alongside Fletch and Raf. Fletch considers moving out of Raf's house and Raf plans a date with Naomi. Fletch changes his mind following advice from Serena.
827	40	"Children of Men"	Karl Neilson	Ed Sellek	12 July 2016	4.34
Mo is appointed acting clinical lead of Darwin ward and books a termination. When she rushes out of surgery with morning sickness, Mo tells Hanssen that she is pregnant. Hanssen encourages her to contact Mr T, but when she does, he warns her to leave him alone. Mo cancels her termination and Hanssen supports her. Isaac tries to impress Ric by treating a teenage patient. When Ric walks in on Isaac and Dom kissing, he is displeased. Isaac realises that Ric is overprotective of Dom following his attack and Arthur's death. Mikey arrives onto the AAU, annoying Fletch, who is dealing with a staff shortage. Fletch treats Ivor Weiland (Ryan Sampson), a drug addict with an abscess; Mikey bursts Ivor's abscess, frustrating Fletch.
828	41	"A Perfect Life"	Karl Neilson	Julia Gilbert	19 July 2016	4.19
Ivor is admitted onto Keller ward with a pseudoaneurysm. Sacha precribes him methadone, but he wants morphine and goes to the hospital pharmacy, where he holds Essie and pharmacist Mel Watson (Jocelyn Jee Esien) hostage. Mel has an asthma attack and hits her head so Essie tries to reason with Ivor; as she helps Ivor realises that he needs support, Sacha bursts into the pharmacy and knocks Ivor to ground, rupturing his pseudoaneurysm. Ivor dies in surgery; Essie is devastated and blames Sacha. Bernie's trauma unit is installed on the AAU. Jason's girlfriend, Celia Branson (Zara Jayne), is admitted after being impaled on a metal gate; Serena questions whether Jason sexually attacked her, but it transpires that he did not. Serena resigns as deputy CEO. F1 doctor Jasmine Burrows (Lucinda Dryzek) arrives for her first shift on Darwin ward and insults Oliver. He tells Jasmine off when she performs emergency surgery on a patient without his permission, so Jasmine stands up to Oliver and he apologises.
829	42	"From Bournemouth With Love"	Graeme Harper	Ailsa Macaulay	26 July 2016	4.12
Morven returns to the hospital and she is promoted to an F2 doctor. Morven treats Hugh's new wife, Lily Musgrove (Larissa Kouznetsova), and feels that he has moved on from Beth too quickly. Morven receives support from Hugh, Bernie and Dom, helping her grieve for Arthur. She then discovers a gift from Arthur: a memory stick containing a video of them performing karaoke. Oliver is offered a job in Pakistan by Elliot. He battles with Guy for his operation on a neurological and cardiovascular patient to take priority, but Mo decides that Guy's operation should take place first so Oliver resigns. Mo apologises and allows Oliver to operate first; Oliver retracts his resignation. While treating a patient together, Dom and Isaac grow close and Dom realises that he can move on from Lee's attack and Arthur's death. Dom and Isaac cover Ric's car in Post-it Notes. Hanssen, Serena, Ric and Sacha attend a mindfulness leadership course.
830	43	"Back in the Ring"	Edward Dick	Jeff Povey	2 August 2016	4.40
A memorial for Arthur is unveiled, but its poor quality leads Ric to create an academy, the Arthur Digby Foundation, for aspiring medical students. Kit is admitted onto Keller ward with an aneurysm and Ric decides he will be the first student. Morven asks Ric whether he could have prolonged Arthur's life, making him question his surgical skills. Mid-operation, Ric freezes and someone else has to take over. Sacha accidentally sends a rude email to Ric; he and Dom try to delete it from his computer before he can see it. A former patient of Oliver's, vicar Lexy Morrell (Jenny Howe), is readmitted onto Darwin ward. Jasmine is delighted to operate on her Herzig device. Lexy advises Oliver to move on from Zosia, so he flirts with Jasmine at Albie's. Jason begins working at the hospital as a clinical audit assistant, although Serena is distracted by him.
831	44	"Indefensible"	Steve Brett	Kate Verghese and Nick Fisher	4 August 2016	4.31
Bernie's son, Cameron Dunn (Nic Jackman), is admitted onto the AAU after being involved in a car crash with his girlfriend, Keeley Carson (Lucy Akhurst), who is Bernie's former registrar. Cameron claims to be driving the car, but is covering for Keeley. Despite Bernie's insistence, Cameron refuses to confess so Bernie persuades Alex to tell the truth, which she does. Sacha and Essie's relationship is strained following Ivor's death. Mel bakes them a proposal wedding cake, which creates further strain as Essie remains annoyed with Sacha. Morven spends her day off in the hospital, where she meets Jasmine. She helps Jasmine treat a patient and they bond; Morven agrees to let Jasmine live with her.
832	45	"Little Acorns"	Steve Brett	Johanne McAndrew and Elliot Hope	23 August 2016	4.17
Guy is launching his autobiography and raising money for his neurosurgery unit. Zosia admits a patient, Valerie Sturgeon (Brigit Forsyth), onto Darwin ward, and Guy is shocked when he sees her. Valerie's family transfer her to a private hospital, but Zosia refuses to let her leave. Valerie reveals that she is Guy's mother, shocking Zosia. Zosia overhears Oliver and Jasmine flirting and confronts Oliver, before claiming that she does not care. Later, Guy reveals to Zosia that as a child, Valerie abused him, leading to his father committing suicide, and shows Zosia scarring he received from Valerie's beatings. Evie is admitted onto the AAU after falling down the stairs and Fletch discovers that Mikey pushed her. Fletch decides to speak to a social worker for help. Ric applies for the position of deputy CEO, but he clashes with the chairman of the hospital board, Tristan Wood (Jonathan McGuiness). Ric is told that the job has been dissolved.
833	46	"Fractured"	Tracey Rooney	Rebecca Wojciechowski	25 August 2016	4.32
Jac returns from her holiday with a positive attitude. After discovering that Valerie is a patient, she decides to treat her with Jasmine. Jac is impressed when Jasmine suggests that they use Herzig device for Valerie, but is shocked when Jasmine reveals that she is her half-sister. Jac resents Jasmine and operates on Valerie without her; Valerie dies in theatre. Afterwards, Guy offers to leave, but Jac refuses and says that she will get rid of him herself. Serena plans to go on holiday with Elinor, but she cancels at the last minute. Evie avoids being discharged from the AAU, not wanting to return home. Fletch reports Serena when Evie goes missing and is upset when he learns Evie wants to live with Serena. Mel organises a picnic for Sacha and Essie in hope of rekindling their relationship.
834	47	"Protect and Serve"	Steve Brett	Joe Ainsworth	30 August 2016	4.78
Following the helicopter crash outside the ED (see "Too Old for This Shift"), ED consultant Connie Beauchamp (Amanda Mealing) and Steph Sims (Tonicha Lawrence), the woman who drove Connie from the road (see "Sticks and Stones"), are admitted into the hospital. Fletch, a former ED nurse, visits Connie and treats Steph and James Fielding (Kirk Barker), a man with mental health problems, who has an obsession with Bernie. Steph escapes from the AAU and is followed by James; they go to the basement. Fletch finds James threatening Steph with a screwdriver; Fletch is stabbed. Serena and Bernie operate on Fletch; afterwards, they are upset and kiss. Morven is sent home, so volunteers at a homeless shelter, where she meets Cameron. Morven reunites a woman with her daughter. Jasmine works with paramedics Iain Dean (Michael Stevenson) and Jez Andrews (Lloyd Everitt); afterwards, they go clubbing with Morven and Cameron.
835	48	"Brave New World"	Tracey Rooney	Katie Douglas	6 September 2016	4.56
Essie thinks that she is pregnant and wants to surprise Sacha, but is devastated when the test is negative. When Sacha questions her, Essie confesses what happened and admits that she is struggling. Essie decides that she cannot try again and they end their relationship. Mr T returns with his new fiancée, bank nurse Inga Olsen (Kaisa Hammarlund). Inga discovers that Mo is pregnant and reveals the news to Mr T, who asks whether he is the father. Mo lies that he is not the father and he is relieved, upsetting Mo. Serena is confused over her sexuality and admits to a comatose Fletch that she has feelings for Bernie. Fletch awakes from his coma and Serena worries whether he heard her, but says that he has not.
836	49	"Say a Little Prayer"	Jamie Annett	Sian Evans	13 September 2016	4.72
Fletch has no feeling in his lower body, worrying Raf, who asks Guy to examine Fletch. Guy is occupied so Raf and Bernie perform a lumbar puncture; Fletch cannot feel the needle, panicking him; he asks Raf to care for his children if he dies. Mikey is admitted onto the AAU after being attacked at school. Raf struggles to diagnose Fletch, but manages to find a diagnosis in time. Jasmine encourages Oliver to tell Zosia that they are a couple. When Oliver praises Zosia's work in theatre, she wonders whether they could reunite. However, she later spots Oliver and Jasmine kissing. Sacha and Essie try to move on from their relationship, but become close after treating a patient.
837	50	"Emotionally Yours"	Jamie Annett	Chris Murray	20 September 2016	4.66
Isaac's former boyfriend, Miles Richardson (Jonathan Firth), is admitted onto Keller ward. Isaac claims that Miles stole an idea for a spleen procedural operation from him, but Dom discovers more about Isaac and questions their relationship. During surgery, a tumour is discovered on Miles and Isaac has to choose between Dom and Miles; he chooses Dom. Jac pushes Jasmine away and growing tired of her, Jac warns Jasmine that if she makes a mistake, she will be transferred. Jac confronts Oliver and Jasmine after realising that they are in a relationship; she reveals that she and Jasmine are half-sisters. Ric is invited to Paris by a French patient. Serena and Ric go to Albie's, where she confesses her feelings for Bernie.
838	51	"Life in the Freezer"	Daikin Marsh	Michelle Lipton	27 September 2016	4.70
Serena finally realises her feelings for Bernie as Hanssen offers Bernie the chance to work abroad. They grow closer, but Bernie decides to accept Hanssen's offer. Serena tries to convince Bernie to stay in Holby and is devastated when she leaves. Mr T's sister, Delwen Thompson (Elizabeth Bower), is admitted onto Darwin ward and suspects that Mo is pregnant with Mr T's baby; Mo maintains the lie that he is not. Mo starts bleeding, but Mr T confirms that the baby is fine and that she is expecting a boy. He asks Mo to be the best man at his wedding. Jasmine messes up during her shift so Jac transfers her to Keller ward. Isaac asks Dom to move in with him and he accepts. He struggles to tell Zosia that he is moving out and when he does, she decides that she may move out too.
839	52	"Snakes and Ladders"	Daikin Marsh	Michelle Lipton	4 October 2016	4.85
When Inga hears Mo berating her relationship with Mr T, she tells Mo that she is not invited to the wedding. Mo apologises to Inga and helps her understand that Mr T wants Mo at the wedding. Jac opens up to Mo about her estrangement from Emma's father, Jonny Maconie (Michael Thomson), and encourages her to speak to Mr T. Raf is struggling to be a single parent to Fletch's children, who arrive onto the AAU. Fletch has an accident during physiotherapy, setting his recovery back and frustrating Raf. Fletch's sadness about his setback annoys Morven, who reminds him that he is alive, unlike Arthur. It is Jasmine's first shift on Keller ward. Isaac hopes to win a registrar competition, so tries impressing Ric; knowing this, Dom falsely tells Ric that Isaac made the tricky diagnosis that he made. Jasmine tells Hanssen that Dom made the diagnosis so Dom is invited to join Ric in theatre.

== Production ==
Holby City's eighteenth series was produced by the BBC and aired its 52 episodes on BBC One in the United Kingdom. The series aired in the 8 pm timeslot on Tuesdays across the United Kingdom, except in Scotland, where the series has no fixed timeslot. Each episode runs for 60 minutes. There was no break between series 17 and series 18, with the premiere of series 18 airing one week after the finale of series 17, in the same timeslot. Oliver Kent continues his role as the executive producer of the show, while Simon Harper serves as the series producer. In October 2015, Harper announced the show would receive a new opening titles sequence and the new sequence was first previewed in November 2015. The new opening titles sequence first aired in the episode, "In Which We Serve", broadcast on 1 December 2015 as the eighth episode of the series. Harper confirmed in October 2015 that the series would feature a standalone episode, which would air in January 2016. The episode centres around junior doctors, Arthur Digby (Rob Ostlere), Morven Shreve (Eleanor Fanyinka), Oliver Valentine (James Anderson) and Zosia March (Camilla Arfwedson), and Harper confirmed that it would answer several "'will they, won't they?' questions". The episode, "Young Hearts, Run Free", aired on 5 January 2016 as the thirteenth episode of the series.

=== Crossovers ===
This series featured several crossover events with Holby City's sister show Casualty. Harper confirmed this series would feature crossovers with the show, especially around the time of Casualty's thirtieth anniversary in September 2016. Guy Henry made three guest appearances as Henrik Hanssen in Casualty between January and May 2016, while Rosie Marcel guest appeared in a February 2016 episode of Casualty as her character Jac Naylor. On 28 June 2016, it was announced that Marcel, Henry and Alex Walkinshaw would guest appear in Casualty's feature-length anniversary episode "Too Old for This Shift", originally broadcast on 27 August 2016, as their characters Jac, Hanssen and Adrian "Fletch" Fletcher respectively. Walkinshaw previously appeared in the serial as a regular character between 2012 and 2014. Marcel and John Michie, who portrays Guy Self, appeared again in Casualty two episodes later.

On 27 August 2016, it was confirmed that Amanda Mealing would appear in an episode of Holby City as her character Connie Beauchamp. The actress previously appeared in the serial between 2004 and 2010. Mealing appeared in episode 47, "Protect and Serve", broadcast on 30 August 2016. Michael Stevenson and Lloyd Everitt also appeared in the episode as paramedics Iain Dean and Jez Andrews while Tonicha Lawrence guest starred as Steph Sims, a patient who appeared in Casualty. George Rainsford also appeared during the eighteenth series as his Casualty character, Ethan Hardy. Rainsford appeared for Ostlere's final scenes as Arthur Digby after they pleaded with producers to allow them to share a scene together.

=== Storyline development ===
In an October 2015 interview with Daniel Kilkelly of Digital Spy, Harper revealed a selection of upcoming storylines to feature in the series. He explained that a "dramatic and exciting" twist in a storyline involving Cara Martinez (Niamh Walsh) and her husband, Jed Martinez (Jody Latham), would challenge Cara's relationship with Raf di Lucca (Joe McFadden), while a theme of "people's pasts coming back to haunt them" would be explored with the characters of Mo Effanga (Chizzy Akudolu) and Serena Campbell (Catherine Russell). He stated that Mo would re-evaluate her life and relationship with Derwood "Mr T" Thompson (Ben Hull) following the return of her surrogate son, whereas Serena would begin a relationship in a new storyline before her past is explored. Harper also announced plans to explore the on-again, off-again relationships between audience favourites Zosia and Oliver, Arthur and Morven, Sacha Levy (Bob Barrett) and Essie Harrison (Kaye Wragg), and Mo and Mr T, adding that they would answer some ongoing questions in late 2015. He also stated that Zosia and Oliver would be "caught in the crossfire" of Jac Naylor's (Rosie Marcel) rivalry with Guy Self (John Michie) following Guy's move to Darwin ward. Harper said that Sacha and Essie's relationship would be challenged by Essie wanting to have a child as well as Sacha's Jewish family being unable to overlook Essie's grandfather's Nazi background. Harper also expressed an interest in creating more nurse characters as he felt the show lacked nursing characters.

In February 2016, David Ames revealed that his character, Dominic Copeland, would be attacked. The storyline began in autumn 2015 when Dominic begins a relationship with patient Lee Cannon (Jamie Nichols), although he is "gutted" when Lee steals from him and disappears. Lee returns when his pregnant wife, Alison Jones (Elizabeth Cadwallader), is admitted onto Keller ward, where she discovers Lee and Dominic had a fling. Lee becomes aggressive and confronts Dominic in the staffroom. Ames explained that Lee is "furious with the fact his whole world has crumbled" so Dominic reminds Lee about his misdemeanours. The actor stated that when Lee grabs a knife, he creates a "tug of war" between them and someone is stabbed. The storyline is revisited in May 2016 when Alison is readmitted onto the ward, leaving Dominic astounded. Dominic helps Alison as she delivers her child, but he becomes enraged when Alison asks him to accompany her to visit Lee in prison. Ames said that Dominic warns Alison that "you can't hold on to the past", something which he has to remind himself.

In his October 2015 interview with Kilkelly, Harper teased a "heartbreaking and touching" storyline to air in 2016 which would bring together every character. This storyline commenced in February 2016 when Arthur is tested as a liver donor for Morven's father, Austin Shreve (Clinton Blake). While testing, Essie discovers a mole on Arthur's back and believes it could be melanoma, however Arthur dismisses her claims as being "over-protective". Essie requests a second opinion from Hanssen, who orders for it to be removed and examined. Ostlere explained that Arthur "feels like the rug has been pulled out from under him" after his diagnosis. Off-screen, Ostlere raised awareness for melanoma, issuing his support during Melanoma Awareness Month. Arthur learns he has secondary tumours on his lungs, before discovering his treatment is not working and his cancer is terminal. The storyline concluded with Ostlere's departure from the show; on-screen, Arthur and Morven decided to travel together but before they can leave, Arthur collapses and falls unconscious. Since Arthur's cancer is too advanced, his life cannot be saved and he soon dies surrounded by his colleagues. Ostlere found filming his final scenes emotional and said he would miss playing the character.

== Cast ==
=== Overview ===
The eighteenth series of Holby City began with 16 roles receiving star billing, a similar amount to previous series. Guy Henry appeared as Henrik Hanssen, the hospital's chief executive officer and consultant general surgeon. Catherine Russell played deputy chief executive officer, clinical lead of the Acute Assessment Unit (AAU) and consultant general surgeon Serena Campbell. John Michie portrayed director of neurosurgery and consultant neurosurgeon Guy Self. Don Gilet stars as consultant anaesthetist and later, consultant general surgeon Jesse Law. Chizzy Akudolu featured as specialist registrar of cardiothoracic surgery and later, consultant cardiothoracic surgeon Mo Effanga. Bob Barrett appeared as Sacha Levy, the clinical skills tutor and specialist registrar, specialising in general surgery, who is later promoted to consultant general surgeon. James Anderson starred as cardiothoracic specialist registrar Oliver Valentine, while Joe McFadden portrayed Raf di Lucca, a specialist registrar of general surgery. Rob Ostlere appeared as CT2 doctor Arthur Digby, while Camilla Arfwedson and David Ames continued their roles as F2 doctors, and later CT1 doctors Zosia March and Dominic Copeland. Eleanor Fanyinka featured as F1 doctor, and later F2 doctor Morven Shreve (later credited as Morven Digby). Alex Walkinshaw starred as AAU ward manager Adrian Fletcher, while Kaye Wragg appeared as staff nurse and transplant co-ordinator Essie Harrison. Niamh Walsh portrayed staff nurse Cara Martinez, while Petra Letang featured as healthcare assistant and later, student nurse Adele Effanga. Additionally, Ben Hull and Carli Norris continued their semi-regular roles as Derwood "Mr T" Thompson, a consultant obstetrician and gynaecologist, and agency nurse Fran Reynolds.

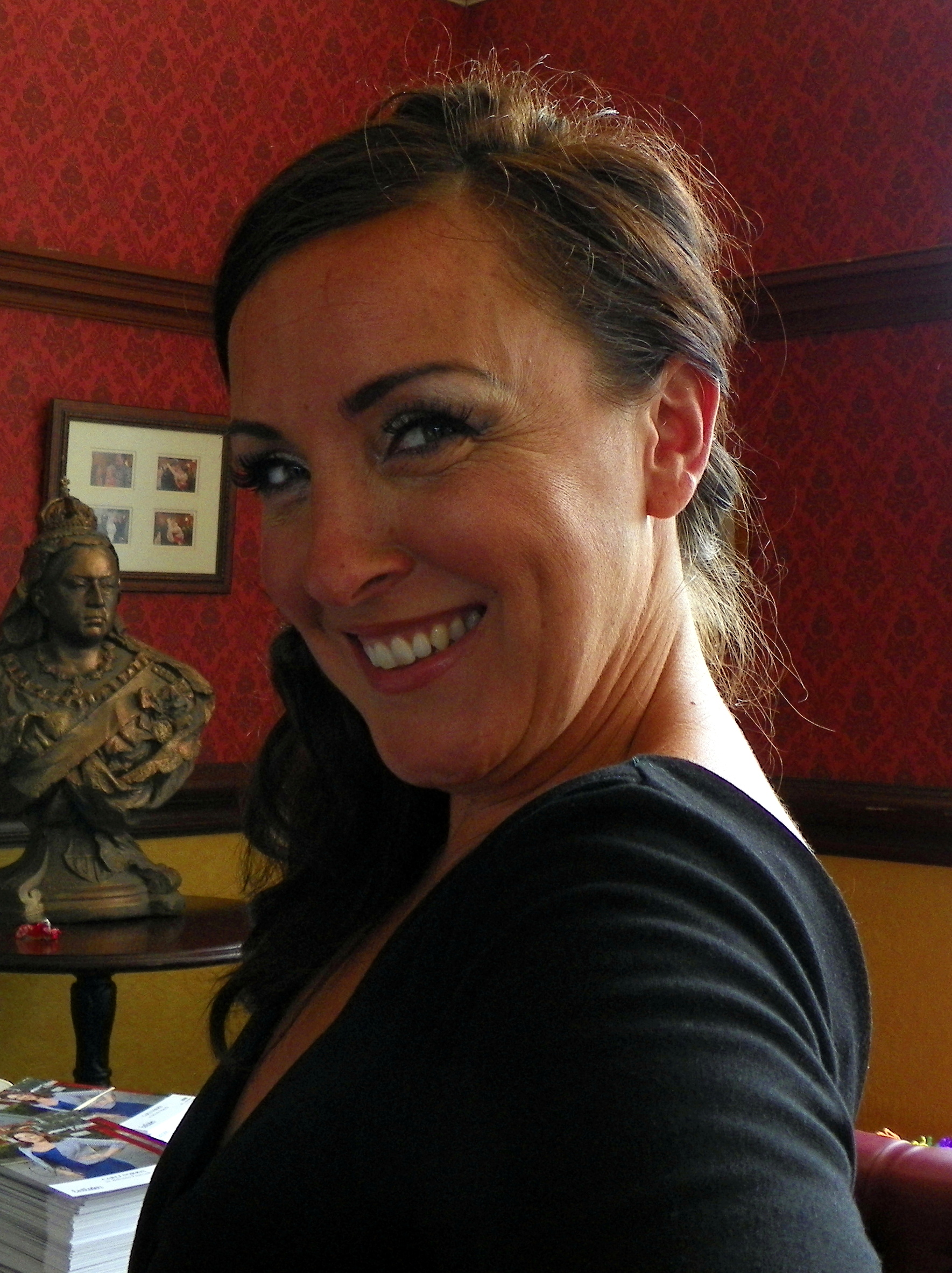
Fran Reynolds actress Carli Norris (pictured) departed the series in episode 11.

Norris departed the serial in episode 11 at the conclusion of Fran's storyline. Letang made her final appearance as Adele in episode 25 after over two years in the role. Gilet also departed the serial and Jesse made his final appearance in episode 27. Hull temporarily departed the serial in episode 31, although returned in episode 48. Ostlere opted to quit his role as Arthur, with producers making the decision to kill off his character. The actor decided to leave to pursue new challenges, but stated the decision was "difficult". Arthur departed in episode 35 when he died following a battle with terminal cancer. Walsh left her role as Cara after appearing on the serial for a year. The character departed in episode 37.

After taking maternity leave in April 2015, Rosie Marcel returned to her role as consultant cardiothoracic surgeon Jac Naylor in November 2015. On Jac's return, Harper said, "What's great about Jac's return is that the bitch is definitely back." Jac returned in episode 7. Hugh Quarshie's return in the role of consultant general surgeon Ric Griffin was confirmed in October 2015, following his break during the previous series. It was revealed that upon his return, Ric would begin a new role within the hospital, later explained to be the clinical lead of Keller ward. Ric returned in episode 12. Jimmy Akingbola and Lauren Drummond reprised their roles as Antoine Malick and Chantelle Lane respectively for a cameo appearance in episode 35.

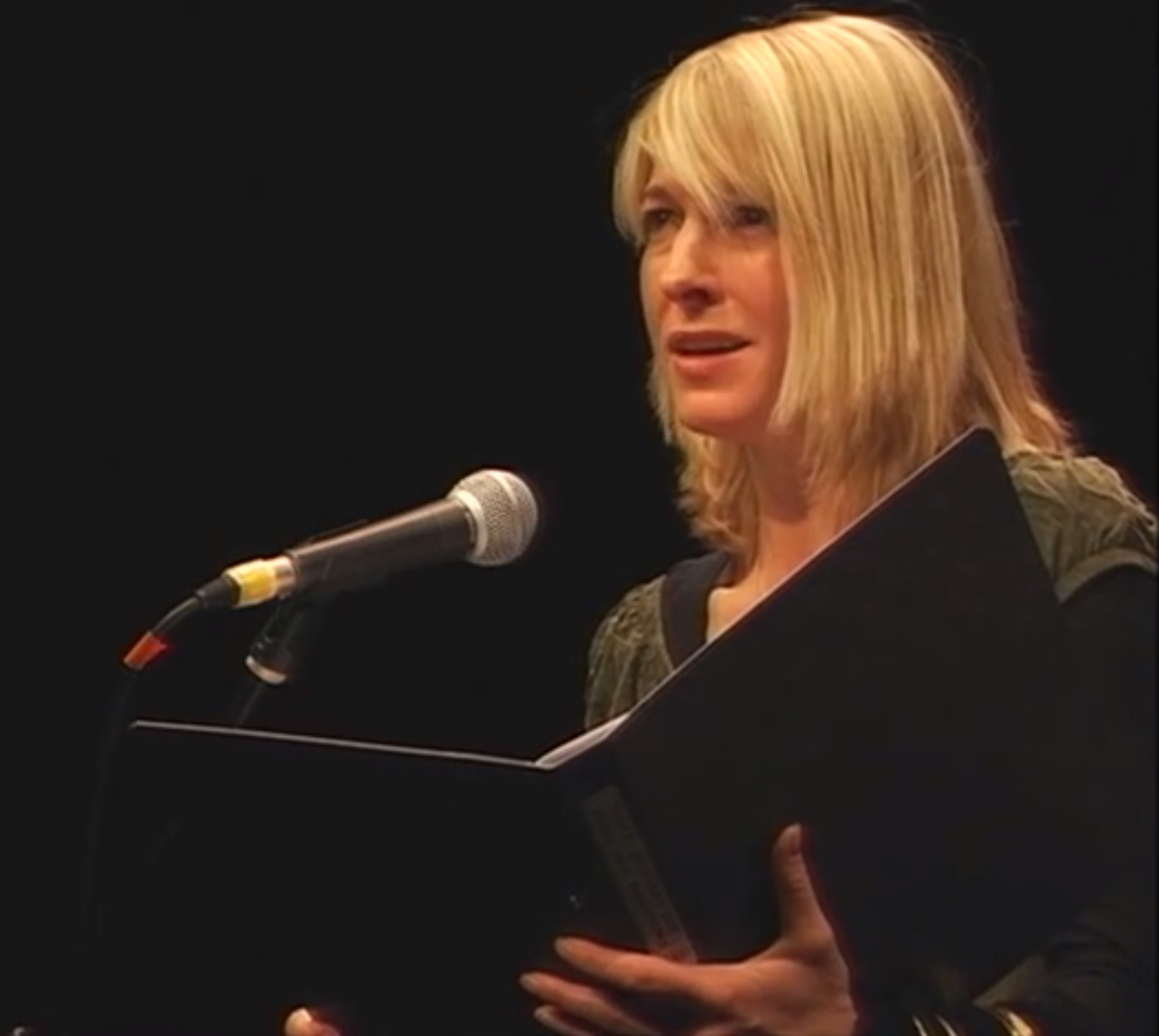
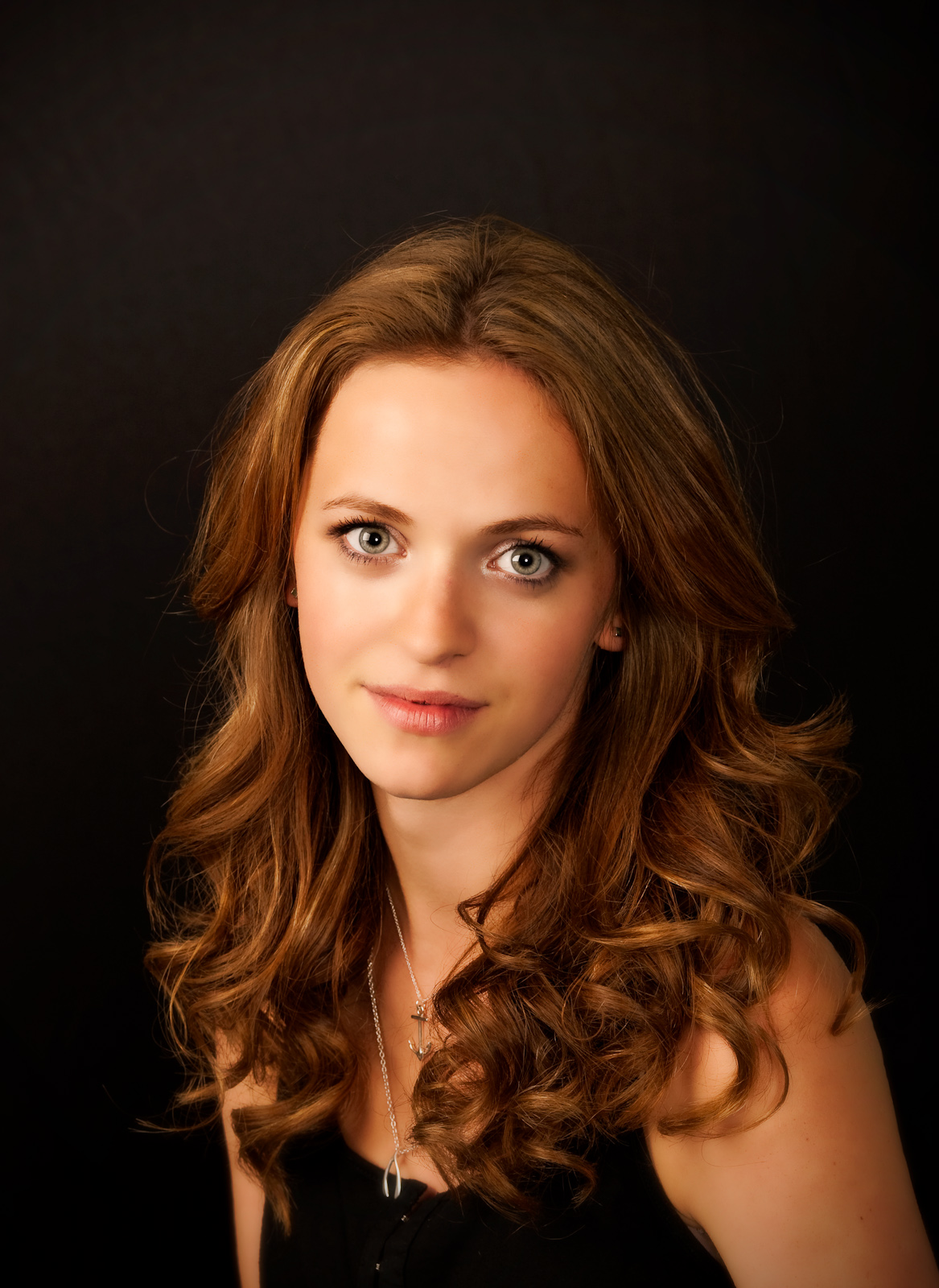
Jemma Redgrave (left) joined the cast as Bernie Wolfe in episode 17, although departed in episode 51. Lucinda Dryzek (right) made her first appearance as Jasmine Burrows in episode 41.

On 3 September 2015, it was announced that actress Jemma Redgrave would join the cast as "feisty" general surgeon Bernie Wolfe, who has experience working in the army. The character was created with Redgrave in mind and producers were "utterly thrilled" when she agreed to join the cast. Bernie initially appeared as a patient, before joining Keller ward. Redgrave was contracted for six months. Bernie arrived in episode 17, and departed in episode 51 at the conclusion of Redgrave's contract. Jason Haynes, portrayed by Jason Robertson, was introduced in episode 18 as the nephew of Serena. Robertson began filming with the serial in October 2015. Marc Elliott's casting in the role of Isaac Mayfield, a "charming, confident and twinkly" doctor, was announced in April 2016. Isaac is a love interest for Dominic, who joins Keller ward. Elliott was contracted for six months. The character made his first appearance in episode 37. Lucinda Dryzek joined the cast as Jac's half-sister, F1 doctor Jasmine Burrows in 2016. The character made her first appearance in episode 41. Commenting on her character, Dryzek said "Jasmine is a little firework. She's lovely, she's a really good doctor and very instinctive with her work. In some senses she's the complete opposite to Jac. She's cheery, fun and smiley." Episode 48 marked the first appearance of Inga Olsen (Kaisa Hammarlund), Mr T's fiancée who works as a bank nurse on Darwin ward.

Series 18 featured several recurring characters, and numerous guest stars. Jody Latham continued his role of Jed Martinez, the husband of Cara, from the previous series, departing in episode 6. Susannah Corbett reprised her role as Sorcia Winters in episode 1 to aid the introduction of William Winters (Jackson Allison), who appeared until episode 5. Caroline Lee-Johnson reprised her role as Patsy Brassvine from the previous series in episodes 4 and 5. Jamie Nichols began appearing in episode 5 as patient Lee Cannon, who becomes romantically involved with Dom. His storyline was teased by Harper who said it test Dom and Arthur's relationship. The character departed in episode 8, although he made another appearance in episode 18. Macey Chipping guest starred in episode 10 as Evie Fletcher, the daughter of Fletch. The character returned for two episodes in August 2016. Mark Healy joined the semi-regular cast in episode 12 as Robbie Medcalf, a love interest for Serena. The character was mentioned by Harper, who promised a romance for Serena. Rupert Frazer appeared between episodes 22 and 27 as Sir Dennis Hopkins-Clarke, a consultant cardiothoracic surgeon working on Darwin ward. Episode 30 marked the first appearance of Kai O'Loughlin, who portrays Mikey Fletcher, the son of Fletch. He continued to star in four further episodes until the end of the series. Lorna Brown starred in five episodes between episodes 30 and 39 as consultant psychiatrist Naomi Palmer, a love interest for Fletch and Raf. Jocelyn Jee Esien made her first appearance as pharmacist Mel Watson in episode 40, featuring prominently in the following episode as she was held hostage by a drug addict. Esien appeared in episode 44, before making her final appearance in episode 46. Cameron Dunn, the son of Bernie, was introduced in episode 44, portrayed by Nic Jackman. He made a further appearance in episode 47.

=== Main characters ===
- Chizzy Akudolu as Mo Effanga
- David Ames as Dominic Copeland
- James Anderson as Oliver Valentine
- Camilla Arfwedson as Zosia March
- Bob Barrett as Sacha Levy
- Lucinda Dryzek as Jasmine Burrows (from episode 41)
- Eleanor Fanyinka as Morven Shreve
- Don Gilét as Jesse Law (until episode 27)
- Guy Henry as Henrik Hanssen
- Petra Letang as Adele Effanga (until episode 25)
- Rosie Marcel as Jac Naylor (from episode 7)
- Joe McFadden as Raf di Lucca
- John Michie as Guy Self
- Rob Ostlere as Arthur Digby (until episode 35)
- Hugh Quarshie as Ric Griffin (from episode 12)
- Jemma Redgrave as Bernie Wolfe (from episode 17)
- Catherine Russell as Serena Campbell
- Alex Walkinshaw as Adrian Fletcher
- Niamh Walsh as Cara Martinez (until episode 37)
- Kaye Wragg as Essie Harrison

=== Recurring characters ===
- Macey Chipping as Evie Fletcher
- Marc Elliott as Isaac Mayfield (from episode 37)
- Kaisa Hammarlund as Inga Olsen (from episode 48)
- Mark Healy as Robbie Medcalf (episodes 12-28)
- Ben Hull as Derwood "Mr T" Thompson
- Nic Jackman as Cameron Dunn (from episode 44)
- Jonathan McGuiness as Tristan Wood (from episode 45)
- Carli Norris as Fran Reynolds (until episode 11)
- Kai O'Loughlin as Mikey Fletcher (from episode 30)
- Jules Robertson as Jason Haynes (from episode 18)

=== Guest characters ===
- Jimmy Akingbola as Antoine Malick (episode 35)
- Jackson Allison as William Winters (episodes 1-5)
- Lorna Brown as Naomi Palmer (episodes 30-39)
- Darcey Burke as Emma Naylor (from episode 11)
- Susannah Corbett as Sorcia Winters (episode 1)
- Lauren Drummond as Chantelle Lane (episode 35)
- Jocelyn Jee Esien as Mel Watson (episodes 40-46)
- Lloyd Everitt as Jez Andrews (episode 47)
- Rupert Frazer as Sir Dennis Hopkins-Clarke (episodes 22-27)
- Jody Latham as Jed Martinez (until episode 6)
- Tonicha Lawrence as Steph Sims (episode 47)
- Caroline Lee-Johnson as Patsy Brassvine (episodes 4-5)
- Amanda Mealing as Connie Beauchamp (episode 47)
- Jamie Nichols as Lee Cannon (episodes 5-18)
- George Rainsford as Ethan Hardy (episodes 35 and 36)
- Michael Stevenson as Iain Dean (episode 47)

== Reception ==
=== Critical response ===
On 29 December 2015, it was revealed that a storyline on Holby City about domestic abuse prompted 177 calls to the BBC Action Line and 2,032 visits to the BBC Action Line's website. Arthur's melanoma storyline also helped one viewer, Rachel Green, to realise that she has melanoma. Green credits the show with making her realise she might have melanoma after they raised awareness on the subject. Actor Jules Robertson received a positive response to his character Jason's introduction. Rachel Sigee of Evening Standard believed that his introduction would begin "a breakthrough year for actors with autism". Nick Llewellyn, the artistic director of charity Access All Areas, told Sigee that he thinks Holby City casting director Sarah Hughes began the process that led to more awareness when she created the BBC Talent Alert for disabled actors.

The series received praise from television critics. The introduction of Jasmine Burrows (episode 41) was enjoyed by Vicki Power (Daily Express), who described her entrance as "memorable" and "like a shot in the arm for the medical soap". Victoria Wilson (What's on TV) called the scene where Fletch asks Raf to care for his children if he dies (episode 49) "heart-breaking". Episode 35, "I'll Walk You Home", was applauded by critics, who found it emotional and upsetting. Sara Wallis of the Daily Mirror dubbed the episode "a particularly gritty and gruelling episode of Holby City". Sarah Deen, writing for the Metro, called the episode "one of [the show's] saddest episodes ever" and said that it managed to "pull at the heart strings". Anthony D. Langford of TVSource Magazine was upset by Arthur's exit and said that he would miss the character. However, he anticipated Isaac's arrival in episode 37 and predicted a "nice meaty love story" between him and Dom.

=== Accolades ===
During series eighteen, Holby City was nominated for the "Best Soap and Continuing Drama" award at the 2016 British Academy Television Awards, however lost to BBC soap opera EastEnders. In November 2015, the serial was nominated in the "Best Soap/Continuing Drama" category at the 2016 Broadcast Awards, Judges credited storylines such as Arthur's death, Serena and Bernie's "blooming" romance, Jasmine's introduction and crossovers with Casualty as reasons for the serial's nomination. At the 2016 Inside Soap Awards, the storylines "Arthur's death", "Fletch saves the day!", and "Zosia and Ollie's romance" were longlisted in the "Best Drama Storyline" category; the first two were then shortlisted and "Arthur's death" was announced as winner. At the same awards ceremony, four cast members — Ames, Ostlere, Arfwedson and Marcel − were longlisted in the "Best Drama Star" category; Ames and Ostlere were then shortlisted. Actress Fanyinka was nominated in the "Rising Star" category and semi-regular cast member Francis was nominated in the "Male Performance in TV" category at the Screen Nation Film and Television Awards in March 2016.

=== Ratings ===
Holby City's eighteenth series averaged 4.5 million viewers. Three episodes of the series failed to reach the top 30 rated programmes. On 17 November 2015, episode 6 received 3.64 million viewers and a 15.8% share of the viewing audience, a drop in ratings due to clashing with a football match. Despite being above the series average, episode 11, broadcast on 22 December 2015, failed to reach the top 30 rated programmes with 4.54 million viewers and a 21.2% share of the viewing audience. The following episode, broadcast on 29 December 2015, received 4.23 million viewers and a 20% share of the viewing audience. Additionally, episode 33, broadcast on 24 May 2016, experienced a drop in ratings to 3.84 million viewers.
