= Jesse Law =

- Holby City character
- Don Gilet as Jesse Law
- First appearance: "Battle Lines"; 22 April 2014
- Last appearance: "Dark Night of the Soul"; 12 April 2016
- Portrayed by: Don Gilet

In-universe information
- Occupation: Consultant Anaesthetist
- Family: Thomas Law (father); Wyatt Law (brother)
- Significant other: Adele Effanga

Jesse Law is a fictional character from the BBC medical drama Holby City, played by actor Don Gilet. He first appeared in the series sixteen episode "Battle Lines", broadcast on 22 April 2014. Jesse arrives at Holby City employed as a Consultant Anaesthetist working on the hospital's Keller ward. The show created a rich backstory for the character meaning he already knew three regular characters Guy Self (John Michie), Zosia March (Camilla Arfwedson) and Colette Sheward (Louise Delamere). Jesse and Guy share a professional history and close friendship as it was Guy who mentored Jesse after noticing his talent. He is characterised as a flirtatious, confident and cocky character. Professionally he is a highly skilled anaesthetist and possesses a strong bedside manner. His lack of humbleness has also created animosity with other characters.

Jesse's first romance storyline played out during his initial tenure. He begins a secretive relationship with Zosia. But when Guy discovers their affair he leaves disgraced. Producers soon brought the character back and Gilet was promoted to the show's regular cast. His return featured Jac Naylor (Rosie Marcel) rehiring him to work on the Darwin ward. Critics have mainly passed judgment over Jesse's persona during his first year on air. Katy Moon of Inside Soap branded him an "irresponsible medic", while her colleagues named him a "mischief-maker" and "brash consultant". A TV Choice writer assessed that Jesse has a "gung-ho attitude".

== Casting ==
On 11 March 2014, it was announced that Gilet had joined the cast playing Jesse Law. The character was billed as a new anaesthetist brought into the hospital by Guy Self (John Michie). Gilet's agent was contacted with an invitation for him to play the character. Gilet had never been offered a role without auditioning and immediately accepted.

== Development ==
=== Backstory and characterisation ===
Jesse and Guy share a professional history. Guy noticed Jesse's talent and became his mentor. The two are similar in their approach to work and have commonalities. Gilet has described Jesse as being Guy's wingman and together they took risks and aimed to be pioneers in their respective fields. He later compared their relationship to that of Star Wars characters Yoda and Luke Skywalker. Jesse was forced to leave his previous job after sleeping with a patient. He is already acquainted with the characters Colette Sheward (Louise Delamere) and Zosia March (Camilla Arfwedson), the latter who refers to him as "uncle".

Jesse is a quirky character. I'd like to think that he has a great bedside manner and he loves all aspects of the medical career that he's taken on. He loves working with people, and he loves the thought that he can help them with their wellbeing and make them better. Jesse has got a passion about what he does and he loves people. He is a driven guy and very much into pushing himself personally.

— Gilet describing his character.

Upon his arrival Jesse presents himself as "very confident, cocky and sure of himself". His official character biography describes him as arrogant. As a highly skilled anaesthetist he can show off his talent. He loves his career and works hard, but he also loves life and parties equally as hard. He is very flirtatious and has a penchant for taking his bedside manner too far. Jesse is also unorthodox in his methods of practicing medicine. Gilet told Katy Moon from Inside Soap that cocksure Jesse "believes in his own skill at saving lives. He loves his job." His personality can be confusing as he enjoys behaving in a controversial manner. Gilet believed that viewers would never be sure if to view him as dangerous or stable. He added "people try to put him in the box of ladykiller, player, or heart-throb, but he's not that two-dimensional. Jesse's flaws are forgivable in Gilet's opinion. He has a "flip side" to his personality which is "puckish and mischievous" and there is an unpredictability about him. This contrasts to the serious approach he applies to his career. Gilet later told Lorraine Kelly that Jesse is a thrill-seeker and free-wheeler living on the edge. But he warned that his character's ways could lead to disaster and danger. From Jesse's inception he faces animosity from Deputy CEO Serena Campbell (Catherine Russell). Gilet told Daniel Kilkelly (Digital Spy) that Serena prefers humbleness as opposed to Jesse praising his own professional skills.

=== Affair with Zosia March ===
"'Uncle' Jesse sped out of the car-park with the imprint of Selfie’s (Guy) fist still in his face and Zosia’s heartbroken wailing ringing in his ears."

—Jane Simon (The Mirror) describing Jesse's temporary departure. (2014)

A reporter from the Grimsby Telegraph reported that the inclusion of patient Lindsey Kendal (Claire Sweeney) in Zosia's storyline would help develop a romance story with Jesse. It begins with casual flirting. But when Jesse offers advice on how to treat patient, Lindsey, they share a kiss in the locker room. Arfwedson told a What's on TV reporter that Zosia was delighted by Jesse's appointment as Holby's latest anaesthetist. She added that they are already both fond of each other and often flirt. When Lindsey marks Zosia bedside manner low, Jesse teases her. The actress noted "Jesse's the only one who can tease Zosia and make her laugh and he doesn't give in to her demands, which is even more attractive to her." Arfwedson believed there was much chemistry between Jesse and Zosia. But it is fellow character Dominic Copeland (David Ames) helps Zosia realise her attraction to Jesse. Following Jesse's tormenting the "predatory" character becomes "very animalistic" and pounces on Jesse, making her feelings clear.

The pair continue their affair in secret but it soon becomes problematic. Arfwedson told Katy Moon (Inside Soap) that Jesse really gets Zosia. She is characterised as an "ice queen" but she just "melts around him". When Jesse distances himself from Zosia, she tries to win him back with negative consequences. The actress detailed the scenes in which Zosia sneaks into an important neurological operation to be close to him. But Jesse cannot cope with her distraction and she kisses him. But the move causes "everything to blow up in her face". The episodes which aired in July feature Jesse ending his relationship with Zosia for good when she becomes too serious about their future. But when Guy finds out about their affair he punches Jesse and he leaves Holby City. Arfwedson assessed that Guy could not accept Zosia and Jesse because the latter "is such a player" and has been sleeping with his daughter.

=== Return ===
Jesse leaves Holby City following the outing of his affair with Zosia. But an Inside Soap writer reported that the character would return to the show. They added that his return would be a "bitter pill" for both Jesse and Guy. Jesse returns during the episode airing on 28 October 2014 and was credited as a regular cast member. Having previously been posted on Keller ward, upon his return Jesse resumes work on Darwin ward. Another reporter said that it does not take long for the character to "ruffle a few feathers" when he returns.

Gilet told a What's on TV reporter that the situation between Jesse and Guy should not have ended so abruptly. So Jesse feels that there is "unfinished business there" but foremost he wants to do his job. When Jac employs him, Guy is forced to accept his employment because he knows what Jesse is capable of professionally and wants the best for the hospital. While working on Darwin the character becomes assigned to cardiothoracic registrar Mo Effanga (Chizzy Akudolu). Gilet said that Jesse and Mo share the same work related chemistry that he had with Guy. But Mo does not trust him and he tries to earn it. He added that Jesse helps Mo in theatre and encourages her to adopt his risk taking approach to surgery.

== Storylines ==
Jesse arrives at Holby City Hospital to secure a job as a Consultant Anaesthetist. Serena is not impressed by Jesse but his old friend and CEO Guy hires him. Jesse pretends to threaten Arthur but this proves to be a test and befriends him. It becomes apparent that there is an attract between Jesse and Guy's daughter Zosia. They later continue their flirtation and kiss. Jesse then tries to conceal their dalliances from Guy. While Arthur realises that they are seeing each other. Colette discovers their affair and warns Jesse that Guy will be angry. Jesse realises that Zosia is behaving erratically and ends their relationship. Guy discovers the affair and attacks Jesse who then leaves Holby City. Jac rehires Jesse to work as a consultant anaesthetist on Darwin and he begins working with Mo. Initially clashing with her, he convinces her to go ahead with an operation. When it is successful they discuss rivaling Jac and Guy's plans. He later sees Zosia and asks her out for a drink but she declines. Jesse mistreats a patient named Lisa Chad (Olivia Vinall), after she tells him that Zosia is mentally ill because of Jesse. He is forced to attempt to make amends with Zosia to save Lisa's life. Mo develops an attraction to Jesse but is upset when she witnesses him kissing her sister Adele Effenga (Petra Letang).

== Reception ==
A writer from TV Choice chose Jesse's arrival in their "pick of the day" feature. They observed that Jesse is not afraid to exploit his friendship with Guy to further his career and said he has a "gung-ho attitude". Jamie Downham of Yahoo! called him a "cheery new doc" and praised the "upbeat tempo" Gilet added to the show. But he felt the lady-trilling and singing doctor was not the most original of characters. He also compared Jesse to previous character Antoine Malick (Jimmy Akingbola), branding them both "crazy but brilliant maverick weirdos". Jane Simon of the Daily Mirror noted that Jesse was completely different to Gilet's previous role, EastEnders murderer Lucas Johnson. But she said that his initial treatment of Arthur may have "set a few alarm bells ringing for the viewers". Laura-Jayne Tyler of Inside Soap enjoyed Jesse and Zosia's tryst because of the potential fallout it could cause for Guy. Her colleague Moon stated "irresponsible medic Jesse took mixing business with pleasure to perilous new depths by sleeping with hospital boss Guy Self's daughter." Other writers from Inside Soap have branded the character a "mischief-maker" and "brash consultant". Andrew Watt from Bedfordshire on Sunday said that Jesse would be keen to avoid Guy upon his return but questioned just how long it would take the character to revert to his usual "flirty form".
