= Jasmine Burrows =

Fictional character from Casualty

- Holby City character
- Lucinda Dryzek as Jasmine Burrows
- First appearance: "What Goes Around"; 25 April 2010
- Last appearance: "Episode 1100"; 15 March 2022
- Portrayed by: Sophia La Porta (2010); Lucinda Dryzek (2016–2022)

In-universe information
- Occupation: Foundation Year 1
- Significant other: Oliver Valentine
- Relatives: Paula Burrows (mother); Jac Naylor (half-sister); Henry Burrows (grandfather)

Jasmine Burrows is a fictional character from the BBC medical drama Holby City. She made her first appearance in the twelfth series episode "What Goes Around", broadcast on 25 April 2010. She was played by Sophia La Porta. Jasmine was introduced as the younger half-sister of established regular Jac Naylor (Rosie Marcel). The character was reintroduced with Lucinda Dryzek in the role during the eighteenth series episode "A Perfect Life", broadcast on 19 July 2016. Jasmine is an F1 initially assigned to Darwin ward within Holby City Hospital. Jasmine is portrayed as being energetic, confident and fun. Jac does not recognise Jasmine and initially sees her as a potential protégé, until Jasmine reveals that she is Jac's half-sister. She tries to bond with Jac, who wants her removed from the ward. Jasmine has a brief relationship with Oliver "Ollie" Valentine (James Anderson).

While working on Keller, Jasmine is reprimanded by Ric Griffin (Hugh Quarshie) when she tries to treat a patient on her own. She is then coerced into making a formal complaint against Ric, resulting in his suspension. After moving to the Acute Assessment Unit (AAU), Jasmine fails to spot a change Elinor Campbell's (Amy McCallum) behaviour before she dies of a brain haemorrhage. Her mother Serena Campbell (Catherine Russell) becomes Jasmine's mentor, but she takes her grief out on Jasmine and is reported for bullying her. Dryzek chose to leave the show in 2017 and the producers made the decision to kill the character off. Jasmine clashes with nurse Fran Reynolds (Carli Norris), before she is stabbed in the liver by a scalpel that was in her own pocket. Jasmine made her final appearance during the nineteenth series on 20 June 2017. Dryzek reprised the role for one episode in 2022. The character was well received, with one critic calling her "a breath of fresh air".

== Casting ==
The character was introduced during the twelfth series episode "What Goes Around", which was broadcast on 25 April 2010. She was played by actress Sophia La Porta. Jasmine was revealed to be Jac Naylor's (Rosie Marcel) half sister.

The character was reintroduced on 19 July 2016 with Lucinda Dryzek in the role. Having not acted in over a year, Dryzek was training as a hairdresser when she learned of the audition for Jasmine. After her first audition, she received a recall the following week. During her final audition, the actress was required to wear Jasmine's costume and go on set with Marcel and a director, which Dryzek said was "really mean because if you don't get the part, you've basically had a day at work!" Two days later, Dryzek learned she had secured the role.

== Development ==
=== Backstory and characterisation ===
The firecracker to her half-sister Jac's ice queen, Jasmine is like a stick of dynamite waiting to be lit. She can think on her feet in a crisis, and possesses a sharp wit to boot. As if in the genes, Jasmine has a streak of the Machiavellian in her, and knows how to manipulate a situation (often with her charms, but also with some blunt truth telling when the time calls for it).

— An excerpt from Jasmine's profile on the official Holby City website.

In her fictional backstory, Jasmine was born a year after Jac was placed in care. Jasmine was "dragged around the world" by her mother Paula Burrows (Julie Legrand) and often left with her grandparents. A teenage Jasmine interrupts an argument between her mother and Jac. After learning Jac is her half-sister, Jasmine comes to visit her in the hospital, but Jac refuses to meet her and Jasmine leaves.

Jasmine's personality is the opposite of Jac's. She is cheerful and fun. During the audition process, Dryzek was told that Jasmine and Jac were similar to the sisters in the 2013 animated film Frozen. She explained, "Jasmine is the happy one who wants to build a snowman, and Jac is the ice queen who doesn't want to know!" Dryzek said Jasmine was a good doctor, like her sister, but she often makes "ballsy decisions" that get her into trouble. However, she stands by her choices and knows that they will save lives. Dryzek told Vicki Power of Daily Express that Jasmine was energetic, happy, confident "in an eyelash-fluttery kind of way", and knows what she wants. Dryzek also called Jasmine "a little firecracker" and "a bit of a minx", adding that she creates a whirlwind wherever she goes, but is not a bad person. She also hoped that viewers would take to Jasmine, as she is likeable and not nasty.

=== Reintroduction ===
Six years later, and having trained as a doctor, Jasmine is introduced to the Darwin ward as an F1 doctor. She does not get the chance to meet Jac for a few weeks, as Jac is away. Dryzek liked that Jasmine had time to be herself and interact with the other characters, before everyone knew her as Jac's half-sister. When Jac returns to the hospital, she is immediately tasked with operating on Guy Self's (John Michie) mother Valerie (Brigit Forsyth). She does not recognise Jasmine, and they work together to find a way to help Valerie. Marcel said Jac initially sees Jasmine as a potential new protégé and she "appreciates" Jasmine's talent. She continued, "Plus, Jasmine's quite witty and Jac loves nothing more than someone with a wicked sense of humour, just like her." Asked if Jac was the reason that Jasmine has come to Holby, Dryzek replied "Yes and no. Even if that's true, Jasmine would never say that out loud. Holby is one of the best hospitals, so there is that element to it too."

Dryzek also said that Jasmine is curious about her sister. Jasmine eventually reveals her identity to Jac, leading Jac to try and have her removed from the ward. Marcel commented that the revelation leaves Jac feeling "very flustered". She refuses to work with or form a relationship with Jasmine, as she thinks of her as the daughter that their mother kept, while she was sent away. Dryzek thought it was good to see Jac temporarily "disarmed" by the revelation and praised Marcel's performance during the scene. She later said Jasmine is disappointed by Jac's reaction, but would never let her see how much she wants them to have a relationship. Jasmine later befriends Morven Digby (Eleanor Fanyinka). Fanyinka commented that Morven loves Jasmine and tolerates her "ridiculousness".

=== Relationship with Oliver Valentine ===
A preview of upcoming episodes showed Jasmine becoming a potential love interest for Oliver "Ollie" Valentine (James Anderson). When Jasmine realises that she is late for her first shift, she strips off and changes into her scrubs in front of Ollie, before asking him on a date. Dryzek admitted to actually being a fan of Ollie and Zosia March's (Camilla Arfwedson) relationship. She explained that Jasmine's arrival would "shake up" their situation and make them see that things between them are not okay. Jasmine feels that she and Ollie are "a distraction" for one another. Dryzek told Daniel Kilkelly of Digital Spy, "It's not a case of: 'Poor Jasmine! Ollie doesn't love her, he loves Zosia'. Jasmine knows what this relationship is and she's the one who confidently says what it is from the start."

Dryzek was sure that Jasmine was not acting maliciously by going after Ollie. The actress stated that Jasmine fancies Ollie and does not feel embarrassed when he learns that. She added that unlike Ollie and Zosia, Jasmine goes after what she wants and says things as it is. Ollie and Jasmine's relationship is short-lived, and she later has a one-night stand with a barman. A couple of months later, after Ollie and Zosia have an argument, Ollie gets drunk and wakes up next to Jasmine. Jasmine is "less remorseful and hungover" than Ollie and she finds the situation funny, so she spends the day winding Ollie up. The incident leads Ollie to realise that Zosia is the only woman for him and he proposes to her.

=== Ric Griffin ===
When Jasmine makes an error, Jac has her transferred to Keller ward. Although she had previously filmed scenes with the cast from Keller, Dryzek admitted to feeling like it was her first day at a new school. Jasmine has a tough time under Ric Griffin (Hugh Quarshie). Ric notices when she turns up to a shift hungover, causing Jasmine to try and prove herself by treating Soloman Cazacu (Marko Leht), a patient who has been injured at work. Ric asks Jasmine to come and get him if she has any problems, but when Soloman's condition deteriorates, Jasmine attempts to treat him on her own. A "furious" Ric confronts Jasmine and their interaction is seen by the hospital board chairman Tristan Wood (Jonathan McGuinness). Dryzek explained that Jasmine had no intention of standing by while her patient's illness grew worse. She continued, "Jasmine wouldn't be able to handle someone dying on her watch because of red tape saying she can't do something. If she knows how to do it, and she's seen someone do it before, she'll do everything she can to save a person's life!"

Tristan asks Jasmine about her time on Keller and her working relationship with Ric. She then admits to finding Ric "intimidating". Tristan coerces Jasmine into making a formal complaint against Ric. Dryzek commented that Jasmine was "a bit of a wally", but Tristan was "a shady kind of character" who convinced her that she would be helping others by speaking out about Ric's bullying. The actress summed up the situation by saying "She's basically had a bit of a moan about a colleague to the wrong person, and now it has seriously backfired on her." The hospital's CEO Henrik Hanssen (Guy Henry) tells Ric about the complaint and he is suspended pending an investigation. Jasmine sees Ric leaving the hospital with his belongings and she feels guilty. Hanssen tries to prove Ric's innocence and attempts to get a confession out of Jasmine. She knows that she has exaggerated an incident that could end Ric's career and eventually admits the truth.

=== Bullying ===
When Serena Campbell's (Catherine Russell) daughter Elinor (Amy McCallum) is admitted to the Acute Assessment Unit (AAU) following a car accident, Jasmine fails to spot a change in Elinor's behaviour before she dies of a brain haemorrhage. Serena blames Jasmine for Elinor's death, pointing out that she should have taken notice of Elinor's confused state before her collapse. Of the situation, Dryzek stated, "I think Elinor's death is another situation where unfortunately, as before, Jasmine was just in the wrong place at the wrong time. She was heading off to get a scan for Elinor when she found her on the floor of the bathroom." Shortly after, Serena decides that she must mentor Jasmine personally, so that she does not make another, potentially fatal mistake. Dryzek explained that Jasmine initially sees Serena as "a maternal figure", something that she has not had with her mother or Jac, but their relationship soon becomes unhealthy.

Russell thought Serena had returned to work too soon after Elinor's death, so she ended up taking her grief out on Jasmine. Serena becomes "obsessed" with mentoring Jasmine, which Russell said was "unfair", but she needed someone to blame for her daughter's death. After Serena is reported for bullying, Jasmine places more pressure on herself when she is asked to assist in a complex surgery. Keen to impress Serena, Jasmine stays up late studying the procedure. But she feels tired the following day and resorts to taking caffeine pills to stay awake. Jasmine passes out after taking too many pills and a patient's brother helps to bring her round. An "exhausted" Jasmine opts not to take part in the operation.

=== Departure ===
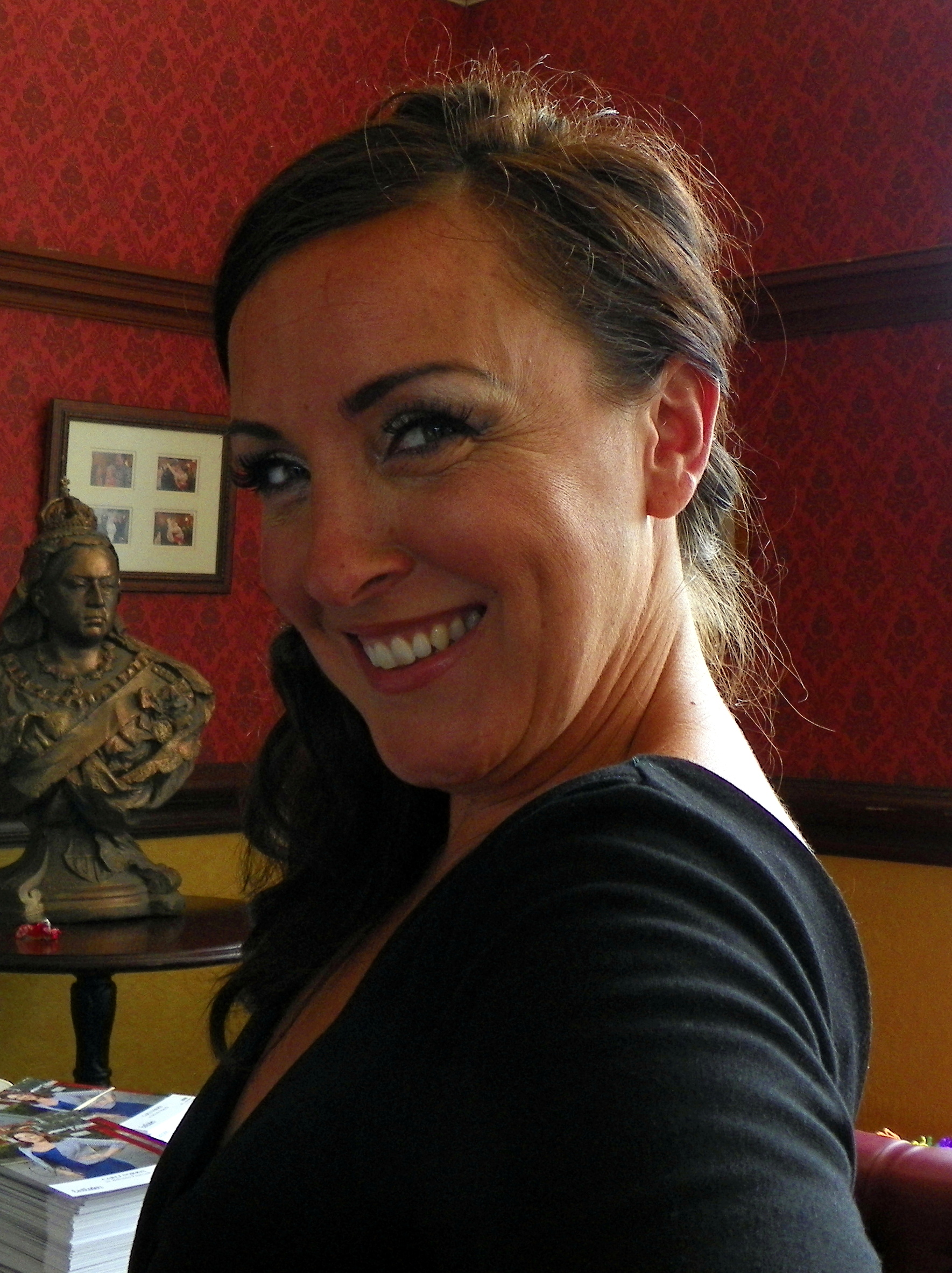
Jasmine died following a confrontation with Fran Reynolds, played by Carli Norris (pictured).

The character made her final appearance on 20 June 2017. Dryzek chose to leave Holby City after a year to pursue further acting roles. She had a feeling that the producers would kill Jasmine off as part of her final storyline, as Jac's family history was poor. Simon Harper later confirmed that Jasmine was going to die and Dryzek admitted to crying when she read the script. She told Victoria Wilson of What's on TV that she had no regrets about being unable to come back, and preferred to have "a big dramatic exit" as it worked well for the character.

In the lead up to her exit, Jasmine bonds with Jac and Dryzek described their relationship as "a bit up and down." When Jasmine decides to leave Holby for a job in London, she feels that Jac does not care. After changing her mind, Jasmine believes that she and Jac can form a relationship, which is what she had wanted from the moment she arrived. Nurse Fran Reynolds (Carli Norris), who grew up in the same care home as Jac, becomes jealous of Jasmine. Fran makes a complaint that a patient died after Jasmine made a mistake, before trying to create a rift between the sisters. Jasmine investigates the care home where Jac and Fran grew up, as she feels that Jac's childhood is to blame for their poor relationship. Jasmine gathers evidence and tries to talk to Jac, who refuses to listen.

When Jasmine tells Fran that she wants to help get her and Jac justice, Fran tells her Jac made the complaint against her. Jasmine soon realises Fran is lying and they have a confrontation in the basement. Dryzek told Wilson that Jasmine really wants to help Fran, but she has become "unstable" and ends up attacking Jasmine, after she says Fran's bond with Jac is fantasy. Fran pulls Jasmine's hair and throws her into a cage, causing a scalpel that is in Jasmine's pocket to stab her liver. Fran leaves Jasmine, who is unable to call for help. Dryzek reckoned that Jasmine was aware that her injury was very serious. New F1 Damon Ford (David Ajao) eventually finds Jasmine and takes her to AAU, where Jasmine's colleagues attempt to save her. However, she dies from her injuries.

=== Return ===
Holby City was cancelled in June 2021 after 23 years on air with the final episode due to be broadcast in March 2022. Producers invited multiple former cast members to reprise their roles during the show's final series. Dryzek's return was announced on 9 March 2022 and Jasmine appears in episode 1100, first broadcast on 15 March 2022. Jasmine returns alongside Essie Harrison (Kaye Wragg) and Arthur Digby (Rob Ostlere), who were also killed-off in the series. They all appear as a vision to a terminally ill Jac, who fears her death.

== Reception ==
Vicki Power of the Daily Express praised the character's memorable introduction, saying "The arrival of Jasmine Burrows (Lucinda Dryzek) in Holby City last month was like a shot in the arm for the medical soap." Power thought Jasmine "instantly made an impression on viewers" and was more "likeable" than Jac. Laura-Jayne Tyler of Inside Soap was also complimentary about the character, saying "Playful Jasmine has brought a breath of fresh air to the wards of Holby City Hospital – but she's been the source of much controversy, too." Dryzek said she had received a mixed reaction from viewers following Jasmine's introduction, especially from fans of the Zosia/Oliver pairing.

Digital Spy's Daniel Kilkelly noted that she "causes an immediate stir at the hospital". On Jasmine's lie about Ric, a reporter from The People observed, "Another tense episode of the medical drama, as Jasmine (Lucinda Dryzek) is caught lying by Hanssen. No one wants to face the wrath of the Holby boss." Reporters from Daily Mirror chose Jasmine's last episode as one of their "Top Picks" for the week. They commented, "There are emotional scenes for half sisters Jac and Jasmine this week – we suggest you have tissues at the ready." A reporter for the Belfast Telegraph stated that fans of the show were left "distraught" after Jasmine's "unexpected" death. In August, Jasmine's death was included on the longlist for the 2017 Inside Soap Awards. The nomination did not progress to the viewer-voted shortlist. Judges at the 2018 Broadcast Awards liked Jasmine's death and felt that it is "a reminder that Holby’s heroes don’t always save the day." They also praised the hostility between Jasmine and Fran and the build-up to Jasmine's death.
