= I'll Walk You Home =

- Holby City episode
- Arthur dies surrounded by his colleagues
- Episode no.: Series 18; Episode 35
- Directed by: Paulette Randall
- Written by: Andy Bayliss
- Cinematography by: Peter Butler
- Original air date: 7 June 2016
- Running time: 58 minutes

Guest appearances
- Jimmy Akingbola as Antoine Malick; Lauren Drummond as Chantelle Lane; Elizabeth Cadwallader as Alison Jones; Hayley Carmichael as Ines Maria; George Rainsford as Ethan Hardy

Episode chronology
← Previous "The Sky Is Falling"	Next → "Missing You Already"
- Holby City series 18

"I'll Walk You Home" is the thirty-fifth episode of the eighteenth series of the British medical drama television series Holby City. The episode was written by Andy Bayliss and directed by Paulette Randall, and premiered on BBC One on 7 June 2016. The episode features the death of established character Arthur Digby (Rob Ostlere), a CT2 doctor who had worked on the show's fictitious Keller and AAU wards. Writers worked alongside a consultant oncologist for medical advice to provide an accurate depiction of terminal cancer. The episode also features the return of two former regular characters and includes an appearance of a character from Holby City's sister-show Casualty.

The episode was structured with positive and upbeat tones transitioning into the dark scenes focusing on death. "I'll Walk You Home" received positive reviews from critics for its "gritty" theme. All reviews noted that it was an emotional episode. Sarah Deen from the Metro branded it one of the "saddest episodes ever".

== Plot ==
Arthur and his wife F1 Morven Digby (Eleanor Fanyinka) announce their decision to go travelling. They want to spend the time Arthur has left visiting historic sites. His best friend CT1 doctor Dominic Copeland (David Ames) is upset and thinks that Arthur is being selfish. Consultant general surgeon Ric Griffin (Hugh Quarshie) tries to make Dom realise that it is Arthur's choice. He decides to distract himself by attending to patient Alison Jones (Elizabeth Cadwallader). Dom realises that he has been unfair to Arthur and they have a discussion. Dom hands Arthur war medals that were stolen from their flat months earlier. Arthur realises that he wants to stay in Holby City and live out his final days with friends.

Consultant cardiothoracic surgeon Jac Naylor (Rosie Marcel) sets CT1 doctor Zosia March (Camilla Arfwedson) a series of surgical tasks to prove her worth. Zosia rises to the challenge but becomes tired of Jac's demands. Jac tells Zosia she is selfish and uncaring towards Arthur. She accuses her of giving Arthur a stent operation to advance her own career. Zosia confronts Jac and accuses her of being "cold", this does not phase Jac who ignores her. Zosia ex-boyfriend, Specialist registrar Oliver Valentine (James Anderson) and Staff nurse Cara Martinez (Niamh Walsh) apologise to her for sharing a kiss. Cara gives Oliver a picture of his dead wife Tara Lo (Jing Lusi) and Zosia spots him with it. Staff nurse Essie Harrison (Kaye Wragg) rallies staff to get ready to perform a song and dance surprise for Arthur. They perform a dance routine and are joined by Ethan Hardy (George Rainsford). Antoine Malick (Jimmy Akingbola) makes a video call to Arthur to wish him well.

Arthur goes to visit CEO Henrik Hanssen (Guy Henry) and he tells him that he has finally realised what he wants from life. Arthur's stent bursts and he collapses on the floor. Hanssen calls a crash team and tries to comfort Arthur. Consultant Sacha Levy (Bob Barrett) and Ric try to operate on Arthur. Sacha announces that the cancer is too advanced and nothing more can be done and Ric agrees. Hanssen goes to AAU to inform Morven who is in theatre with Serena Campbell (Catherine Russell). Arthur is taken into a side room where Morven tells him that she loves him. Arthur is unconscious and has visions of Morven, Dom, Zosia and his old friend Chantelle Lane (Lauren Drummond). Arthur responds to Morven holding his hand but then dies surrounded by his friends and colleagues. Zosia breaks down on Darwin ward and Jac rushes to console her.

== Production ==
The episode focuses around the final scenes of Rob Ostlere as Arthur Digby following three years in the show. The actor had informed producers of his decision to leave six months prior. They then devised an exit storyline for the character in which he is diagnosed with terminal cancer. Ostlere was told of their intention to kill the character off, the results of which play out in "I'll Walk You Home". The events of the episode could have been different as producer Simon Harper later gave Ostlere the chance to have his character leave the show alive.

The episode was produced by Jane Wallbank, written by Andy Bayliss and directed by Paulette Randall. Storyliners had been liaising with a consultant oncologist named Bruce Sizer who gave advice on the medical condition featured in the episode. Writers structured the episode so it began "lovely and upbeat" until the closing scenes which contained Arthur's death.

Former regular cast members Jimmy Akingbola and Lauren Drummond returned to filming especially for the episode, reprising their roles as Antoine Malick and Chantelle Lane respectively. Akingbola filmed scenes which were featured in a Skype video call. Drummond filmed scenes with other cast members, with her footage stylised as part of a dream sequence envisioned by Arthur. The cast were involved in filming a number of dream sequences which were given a "surreal" feeling to them.

George Rainsford guest starred as Ethan Hardy, a character from Holby City's sister-show Casualty. His inclusion was a result of a decision made by executive producer Oliver Kent who oversees both shows. Rainsford and Ostlere had been asking Kent for the scenes for some time. The actors were friends for fourteen years and wanted their characters to share screen-time. After filming had wrapped for the episode Ostlere was supposed to give a farewell speech to the cast and crew but he was too upset.

== Promotion ==
Producers wanted to keep exact details of the episode a secret until it was broadcast. They also wanted to Akingbola and Drummond's involvement quiet to surprise viewers. Though Ostlere did disclose that past characters would return in an interview published via What's on TV. Advance spoilers only indicated that Arthur and Morven planned to leave Holby City to go travelling and that Zosia and Jac would feature in scenes on the show's Darwin ward. The show released a promotional trailer for the episode a week in advance. It featured various characters and included parts of scenes that form Arthur's exit from the show. It was broadcast on 7 June 2016 on BBC One in the United Kingdom. A re-run was shown on BBC Two on 13 June 2016.

== Reception ==
The episode was watched by 4.4 million people during the BBC One airing. Arthur's death was nominated for "Best Drama Storyline" at the 2016 Inside Soap Awards.

Laura Jayne-Tyler from Inside Soap said "Wow. That was one hell of an episode of Holby City." She added it was a struggle to recover from the "tear-jerking instalment" episode. Sara Wallis from the Daily Mirror noted that hospital dramas can be emotional, but branded "I'll Walk You Home" a "particularly gritty and gruelling episode". Another Daily Mirror critic warned viewers that it was "best to keep the hankies to hand" because the episode is emotional. They added the episode was full of surprises for Arthur. Sarah Deen from the Metro said that his death "might be one of its saddest episodes ever". She called Arthur being readmitted to hospital "the most heartbreaking scenes". The scene involving Zosia and Jac breaking down in each other's arms "left viewers completely overcome with emotion". Deen concluded that "Holby really does pull at the heart strings when it’s ready."

Kayleigh Dray from Closer said the fact the episode featured the death of a "popular character" and made "tearjerking scenes". The critic noted that her colleagues were upset, adding "Oh Arthur, why did you have to ruin our makeup like that? We cried SO many tears for you." Frances Taylor from Bt.com said "fans of the BBC hospital drama were left weeping after the episode aired." She noted that the episode caused many viewers to discuss the show on social media website Twitter. Daniel Kilkelly from Digital Spy said it was a "heartbreaking episode". He chose the scenes in which Arthur was rushed to surgery as the most "tearjerking scenes". The episode was included in a "TV Highlights" feature in TVTimes magazine and was given a three out of a possible four star rating. The episode was included in Soaplife magazine's "must see TV" feature. The episode was also chosen for the "Pick of the day" features in the Coventry Telegraph and South Wales Echo. Due to the tough subject matter, a writer from the Daily Record branded it "Holby Gritty". Anthony D. Langford writing for TVSource Magazine said "Arthur’s death was very sad as I thought it would be. He was one of my faves on this show. I’ll miss him. I did mist up a few times during this episode, mostly during the song his co-workers sang to him. And Zosia’s reaction got me too."
