= Adele Effanga =

- Holby City character
- Petra Letang as Adele Effanga
- First appearance: "Intuition"; 14 January 2014
- Last appearance: "A Friend in Need"; 29 March 2016
- Portrayed by: Petra Letang

In-universe information
- Occupation: Healthcare Assistant; Student Nurse F5
- Family: Ina Effanga (mother); Celia Effanga (sister); Mo Effanga (cousin)

Adele Effanga is a fictional character from the BBC medical drama Holby City, played by actress Petra Letang. She first appeared in the series fifteen episode "Intuition", broadcast on 14 January 2014. Adele arrives at Holby City hospital to start her role as a Healthcare Assistant on the hospital's AAU ward and is introduced as the sister of established character Mo Effanga (Chizzy Akudolu). Adele is characterised as a "outgoing and friendly" person who plays up to the "good-time girl" stereotype. Though she is hard working and striving towards forging a respected career in the medical profession. The character has a unique dress sense which is "girly and quirky". According to Letang, Adele often wears individual unmatched pieces which can be "outrageous" but often excites actress. She later transfers to the Darwin ward alongside Mo and her presence undermines an insecure Mo. Writers soon introduced more members of the Effenga family including their mother and sister. Following the discovery that Mo is actually Adele's cousin the pair begin to feud.

Adele's other storylines have focused around her relationship with Jesse Law (Don Gilet). She has a pregnancy scare but is later diagnosed with ovarian cysts which have to be removed. Adele also decides to end her relationship with Jesse on their wedding day. She changes her mind because he plans various aspects of their future without her involvement. One of Adele's most high-profile stories has been her attempted murder. This resulted her fighting for her life, having brain and heart surgery and a subsequent coma. Adele has generally been well received by critics of the show.

== Casting ==
On 17 September 2013, it was announced that actress Petra Letang had been cast as Adele, the sister of established character Mo Effanga (Chizzy Akudolu). Adele's is the show's first regular Healthcare Assistant and she previously worked as a holiday rep. Of her casting Letang stated "Holby here I come! I can't wait! I'm really excited about causing a bit of mischief and bringing some fun to the wards. I'll be playing Mo Effanga's sister so viewers can expect to see some sisterly love and maybe some sibling rivalry!". Letang previously had experience playing a nurse Naomi Julien in BBC soap opera EastEnders. The character was not well received and Letang worried about being typecast to her previous role and hoped viewers would like Adele better.

== Development ==
=== Characterisation ===
Easily underestimated, Adele can be seen as a commitment shy good-time girl, and though she plays up to this stereotype, in truth she’s one of life’s grafters. Rarely demanding the credit she deserves, Adele has a sharp intuition that a lot of her colleagues could use – behind the ready laugh and big smile, Adele has hidden depths.

— BBC Online.

Adele is characterised as wanting to make her working life fun. She likes to throw herself into tough working environments she is not pre-qualified for and learn on the job. She has been described in BBC publicity as being a "outgoing, friendly, and exuberant", real people person and the "naughty little sister" of Mo. She has a "sharp intuition" and is hard working often not gaining any credit. Holby City Producer Simon Harper described Adele as "funny, sassy and streetwise and it's a delight to have Mo's naughty little sister working at the hospital." Letang said that people cannot help loving "feisty" Adele because "she tells it like it is". Letang told Tricia Welch of the Daily Express that Adele has a unique style and is wild about colour. She dresses "girly and quirky" and puts individual unmatched pieces together to form her outfits. Describing Adele's worst ever outfit Letang went with "a bright, multicoloured, floral jumpsuit – pink, purple and blue from top to toe." Though she added that she gets excited to see what Adele will wear "because it’s always fun and outrageous".

=== Introduction and family ===
Before Adele had appeared on-screen Harper warned that Mo would not be best pleased to have Adele working in the same hospital. Adele arrives to begin her first shift at Holby City Hospital and does not inform Mo about her arrival. Mo is shocked when she bumps into Adele in a corridor and she immediately disapproves of her new career choice. Letang told an Inside Soap reporter that both of the characters are quick with their mouths and feisty. She added "Mo assures Adele that she won't last because this is a serious job and Adele isn't a serious girl." Harper explained that one issue between Adele and Mo would be the latter's insecurities despite being the sibling who has had more success. Adele can make Mo feel undermined because she possesses a "wonderful talent of making them feel like children again". Adele decides to further her career and decides to study for a nursing qualification. But her plans come under scrutiny when she administer first aid to a patient despite not being qualified. Adele is reprimanded by Jac Naylor (Rosie Marcel) for her actions, this leaves her unsure of her future in the profession.

Adele takes an extra role as a medical advisor at a local radio station but impersonates Mo. The writers used the story to create a feud between the sisters and Mo takes over Adele's radio role. Mo finds her new celebrity status satisfying because it gives her "some notoriety" rather than feeling overshadowed by Adele working alongside her. Adele's relationship with Mo is made more problematic when Mo accuses her of ignoring a patient's symptoms. Akudolu told Katy Moon (Inside Soap's) that Mo is annoyed with Adele after she impersonated her on the radio and views her presence as "a nuisance". The actress explained that "deep down, she wants to be carefree like Adele, but there's not much time for play – she's so serious about her career." Akudolu also revealed that there "scope for a whole [Effanga] family to show up".

Akudolu's prediction would later serve correct as Adele and Mo's mother, Ina (Angela Wynter), and younger sister, Celia (Madra Ihegborow), were introduced in January 2015. It was also publicised that a "huge family secret" would be revealed in an episode centric around a wedding. Adele attends Celia's wedding to Max Niven (Robert Mountford), who is revealed to be Mo's ex-boyfriend. When Adele's father fails to attend the wedding the Effanga siblings presume he is busy caring for their grandfather, but it is then revealed that he has been having an affair and with his another woman. Mo tries to console her mother but this causes an argument between the two resulting in Ina issuing the revelation that Mo is her niece and not her daughter, adding that she raised her as her own. This means that Mo is not Adele's sister, but her cousin. The drama causes Ina to suffer a heart-attack and Mo is forced to save her. Adele is then forced to deal with the fact that her mother could die from her "life-threatening" condition. Mo also remains undecided whether or not to inform Adele they are actually cousins.

Adele decides to contact Mo's biological father, Clifford George (Geff Francis) without her knowledge behind her back. Adele finds him by using medical records which breaks strict hospital rules. Akudolu told Laura-Jayne Tyler of Inside Soap that Adele potentially ruined any hope of getting to know her father because he flees the hospital when Adele informs him that she is a successful surgeon. This causes an argument on the ward and gets them into trouble. Akudolu explained that when she and Letang filmed the scenes they knew this should not be witnessed by patients. But for the purpose of the story they obliged, the actress explained that Professor Elliot Hope (Paul Bradley) intervenes and warns them that one of them will need to leave Darwin unless they resolve their feud.

=== Relationship with Jesse Law ===
"Jesse’s a bit of a charmer while Adele's very worldly; she might not be academically intelligent, but she's very street-smart. I do think there's a genuine love there between them both, they perhaps just have slightly different ideas of how to 'do' relationships; Adele likes to discuss things, whereas Jesse just likes to get things done."

— Letang on Adele and Jesse's relationship. (2015)

Adele's first romantic relationship is with consultant anaesthetist Jesse Law (Don Gilet). Mo developed feelings for Jesse which went unnoticed by Adele. Letang told Lorraine Kelly that her character genuinely did not know about Mo's feelings and stressed it was not a case of her "stealing her sister's man [...] It is difficult but he fancied Adele." Akudolu added that "Mo's got the brains no offence and Adele's the pretty, fun loving one, so the fact he has gone for her is serendipity really." Following a number of months dating, Jesse is offered a job in the United States. The writers placed the story alongside a pregnancy scare for Adele to test the duo's relationship. Adele is upset that Jesse would consider taking a job so far away. But she faints and is checked over; obstetrician Derwood Thompson (Ben Hull) informs her that she is pregnant. According to Inside Soap's Tyler, Jesse's reaction proves he had no plans to have children. But Derwood tells Adele that the pregnancy was a mistake and she has developed ovarian cysts. Jesse is forced to make a choice between his career and supporting his girlfriend through her illness. The story succeeds in bringing "them closer together than ever". Adele has the cysts removed and she recuperates quickly. When back on Darwin ward Adele becomes suspicious of Jesse's involvement with patient Talesha Chambers (Emi Wokoma). Unbeknownst to Adele, the pair are planning a surprise for her. She confronts Jesse but is shocked when Talesha leads a choir into the ward singing and Jesse proposes to her but an embarrassed Adele runs off. Jesse then has to convince Adele of his commitment and she accepts his proposal.

In the lead-up to their wedding Adele nearly dies. Jesse goes ahead with wedding plans and finding their first shared house. Adele finds this overwhelming and begins to have doubts about marrying Jesse. On their wedding day Adele decides to attend work rather than prepare for the event. Adele treats an elderly couple who she perceives to share unconditional love. This makes Adele evaluate whether or not she will share the same with Jesse. But Letang told Tyler (Inside Soap) it was facing death that ultimately made Adele reflect and question her life. Jesse made her feel pressured to get married, though they do love each other. Letang branded her character "crazy" for not wanting to marry him but understood the pressure and anxiety "of making such a big lifelong commitment". When Letang first read the scripts she was shocked and struggled to understand why producers made the decision to split the duo up. She eventually came to the realisation that Adele feels uninvolved in her own future because Jesse took it upon himself to solely plan her wedding and first house. She added that it is every woman's dream to plan their wedding and Jesse has taken this away from her; "Jesse is rushing her into after planning it all without her, and she feels stifled." The actress recalled filming their characters' emotional break-up scenes as "heartbreaking", especially Gilet's performance as the jilted Jesse.

=== Attempted murder ===
In July 2015, writers placed Adele at the center of a dramatic attempted murder story. The near-fatal attack was the culmination of a storyline featuring fellow characters Clifford and nurse Adrian Fletcher (Alex Walkinshaw). The pair had become involved with a gang who ordered them to steal medical supplies. When Fletch calls time on the robbery, the gang decide to target Clifford's daughter Mo. But in a case of mistaken identity Adele is attacked instead. Walkinshaw said his character bears the guilt of Adele's attack even though he tried to do the right thing.

Adele is found badly beaten outside of the hospital. Mo is shocked and cannot figure out who would want to carry out such an attack. Akudolu told a What's on TV reporter that it throws Mo's world into chaos. Adele has to undergo emergency surgery to save her life but is left on a life support machine fighting for her life. But as Mo is related to Adele she is not allowed to treat her, Akudolu said this leaves Mo feeling "impotent". Adele's condition deteriorates and Mo and neurosurgeon Guy Self (John Michie) argue over patient care. The actress explained that "Mo's worried about Adele’s heart rate and wants to do a heart scan but Guy is adamant that they need to operate on Adele's brain first. It's a heart-over-head dilemma, which the pair has clashed over before and, once again, the head wins." Following the surgery Adele then needs more surgery following a bleed on her heart. This time the surgery involved is Mo's specialty and she decides to intervene to operate on Adele. Akudolu stated that her character is not bothered about being reprimanded for her actions, adding "she'll happily face the consequences later. Right now, she just wants to be the one to save the day!"

Off-screen Letang was required to spend ninety minutes every day in make-up. She had prosthetics applied to her to gain Adele's near-death look. The actress also found it difficult to film Adele's hospital bed scenes. She struggled to keep still and gained a new-found respect for Holby City's guest actors who play patients. It also made her more attentive while filming with them. Following her procedures Adele is left in a coma. When she wakes up she begins to recover from her ordeal. Adele later returns to work, but on her first day she treats a patient she knows. Mo worries that Adele has returned too early after her attack when she gets too involved in the patient's case.

== Reception ==
A reporter from the North Wales Daily Post praised Adele's skills jesting that she could save the NHS money if they send patients to Adele. They noted that she often solved medical problems via patient care despite only being a health care assistant. Jane Simon writing for the Daily Mirror bemoaned the dearth of realism when Adele tried to leave her role at the hospital. The incident played out following Adele being reprimanded by Jac. They noted that a hospital's human resources department would not let staff leave without working their notice. Simon later praised Adele for being brave enough to confront Jac Naylor. She said that viewers would be "impressed" with Adele standing up to Jac and "teach her some manners". Kayleigh Dray from Closer described the character's style stating "Adele is very OTT and quirky, managing to add a little bit of leopard print to even her hospital scrubs."

A South Wales Echo writer questioned whether Adele would ever be able prove that she really is a capable member of the team. Inside Soap's Tyler noted that two siblings working together in a busy hospital could be "an explosive combination". She noted Adele and Mo managed to keep their squabbles at home until the point they discovered they were not actually siblings. Commenting on Adele's nosey opinions on her colleague's lives a reporter from the Daily Record quipped, "As we've noted before, Adele is part human X-ray machine, part mind-reader, so watch this space."
