= Atiha Sen Gupta =

British playwright and screenwriter (born 1988)

- Born: 1988 (age 37–38)
- Education: Hampstead School; Warwick University
- Occupations: Playwright and screenwriter
- Notable work: What Fatima Did (2009)

Atiha Sen-Gupta (born 1988) is a British playwright and screenwriter. She is writer-in-residence for 2016–2017 at Theatre Royal Stratford East in London, England, where her play Counting Stars was produced in 2016. The daughter of a journalist and activist Rahila Gupta, Sen Gupta attended Hampstead School in London, where she became involved as a teenager with the Hampstead Theatre's youth company. She studied politics and sociology at Warwick University, graduating in 2012.

In 2009, when she was just 21, her debut play What Fatima Did premiered at the Hampstead Theatre to critical acclaim. The play was produced in Germany at the Hanseatic State Theater in 2011, and received the Youth Theater Prize at the Heidelberger Stückemarkt festival in the following year. In 2014, her play about police racism, State Red, was produced at the Hampstead Downstairs. She followed up with Counting Stars, about two Nigerian nightclub toilet attendants working in a club in "post-Lee Rigby post-Brexit Woolwich", which played at the Edinburgh Fringe 2015 and on the main stage of the Theatre Royal Stratford East in August–September 2016.

As well as theatre, Sen Gupta also writes for television, beginning in 2009 when she co-wrote "Noami", an episode in the third series of Skins. On 23 June 2016, an episode Sen Gupta co-wrote with Katie Douglas aired on BBC One's Holby City.

Sen Gupta has worked for several disability advocacy organizations. Her brother Nihal, who had cerebral palsy, died at the age of 17.
