= Lucinda Dryzek =

English actress

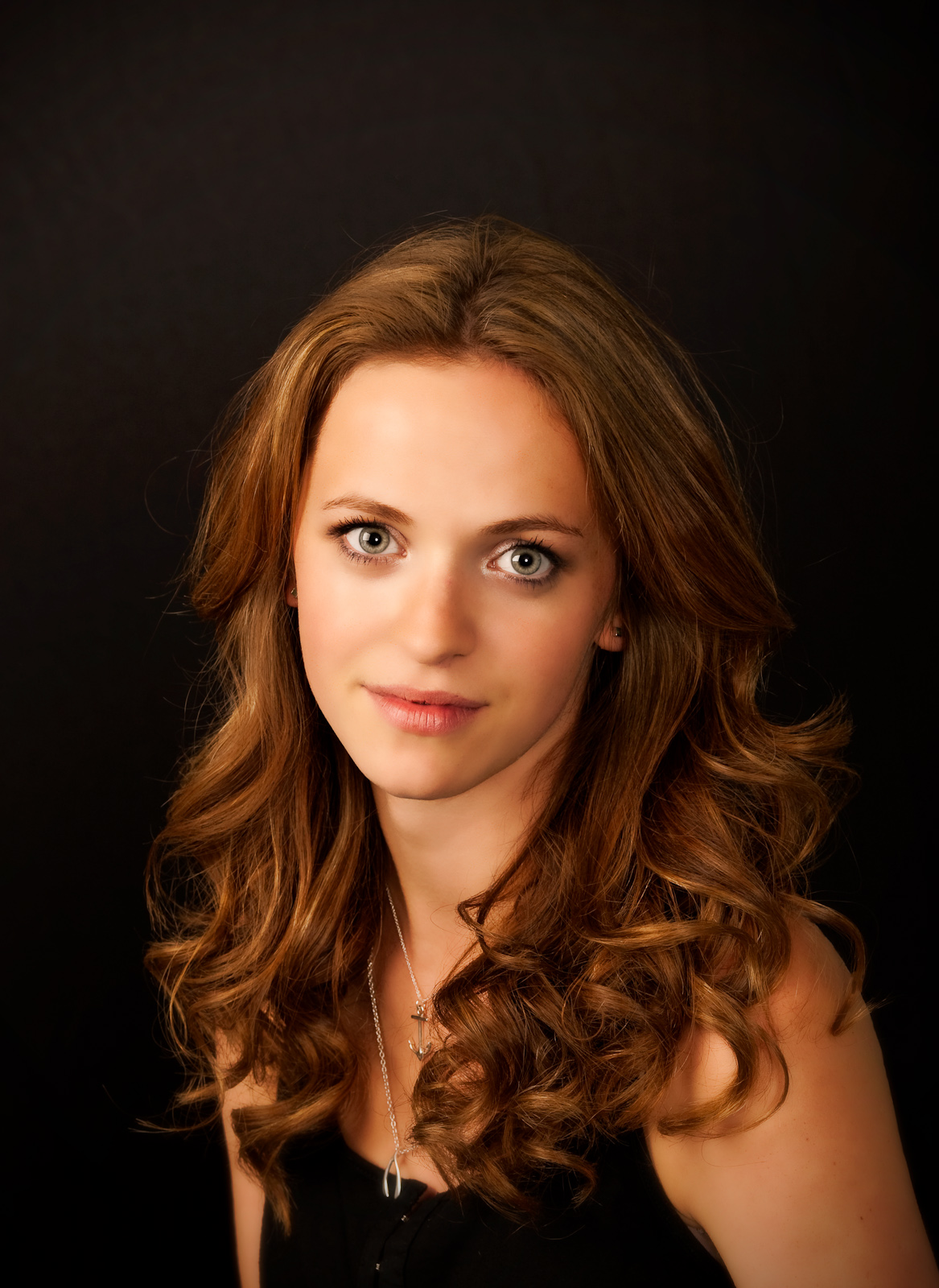
- Dryzek in 2009
- Born: 4 August 1991 (age 35); High Wycombe, Buckinghamshire, England
- Education: Sylvia Young Theatre School
- Occupation: Actress
- Years active: 2001–present
- Known for: School Reunion; Life of Riley; Holby City; Vital Signs; Pirates of the Caribbean: The Curse of the Black Pearl

Lucinda Dryzek (born 4 August 1991) is an English actress of Polish descent, known for playing Katy Riley in the BBC sitcom Life of Riley and Jasmine Burrows in BBC medical drama Holby City.

== Career ==
She started acting at the age of eight and has since appeared in several film, television and theatre productions. Dryzek played the character Katy in the BBC family sitcom Life of Riley, from 2009 in all three series. She is also known for her role as Young Elizabeth Swann in 2003 film Pirates of the Caribbean: The Curse of the Black Pearl.

Her credits include three British television series, appearances in The Sound of Music, Joseph and the Amazing Technicolor Dreamcoat and several pantomimes, and roles in feature and made-for-television movies. She has also acted in TV series Help! I'm a Teenage Outlaw as Lady Devereux/DeeDee. She had supporting roles in the TV show Five Days and in the film City of Ember.

Dryzek joined the cast of Holby City as F1 doctor Jasmine Burrows, the half-sister of established character Jac Naylor (Rosie Marcel). She made her first appearance during the episode broadcast on 19 July 2016, and last on 20 June 2017.

== Filmography ==
=== Film ===
Year	Title	Role	Notes
2003	Pirates of the Caribbean: The Curse of the Black Pearl	Young Elizabeth Swann	
2008	City of Ember	Lizzie Bisco	

=== Television ===
Year	Title	Role	Notes	Refs
1999	Home Farm Twins	Natalie 'Nat' Baker		
2001–2002	Micawber	Lily Micawber	4 episodes	
2002	Silent Witness	Cassie Dalton	Episode: “Closed Ranks” (2 parts)	
2003	The Queen's Nose	Gemma	6 episodes	
2005	Tom Brown's Schooldays	Charlotte	Television film	
2006	Vital Signs	Lexie Bradley	5 episodes	
2006	Love Lies Bleeding	Young Joanne	Television film	
2006	Doctor Who	Melissa	Episode "School Reunion" (2.3)	
2004–2006	Help! I'm a Teenage Outlaw	Deedee / Lady Devereux	13 episodes	
2007	Five Days	Tanya Wellings	3 episodes	
2007	Forgiven	Older Sophie	Television film	
2007	The Whistleblowers	Lizzie Spencer	Episode: "Starters"	
2008	10 Days of War	Yasmin	Episode "Failure Is Not an Option"	
2008	Coming Up	Eva	Episode "Thinspiration"	
2008	Spooks: Code 9	Alice Hamilton		
2008–2009	Parents of the Band	Lucy	4 episodes	
2009	Doctors	Harriet Jonas	Episode "If You Love Somebody"	
2009–2011	Life of Riley	Katy Riley	20 episodes	
2011	Outnumbered	Victoria	Episode 4.6	
2012	Cardinal Burns	Olivia	6 episodes	
2013	Stella	Leah	6 episodes	
2013	Quick Cuts	Becky	3 episodes	
2014	Midsomer Murders	Amy Strickland	Episode: "Wild Harvest"	
2015	Jonathan Strange & Mr Norrell	Flora Greysteel	2 episodes	
2016–2017	Holby City	Jasmine Burrows	Series Regular	
2017	White Gold	White Witch	Episode: "Smell the Weakness"	
2018	Unforgotten	Claire Finch	6 episodes	
2019	Silent Witness	Marie Walsh	2 episodes	
2019	The Twilight Zone	Katherine Langford	Episode: "Six Degrees of Freedom"	
2022	London Kills	Samira Hart	Episode: "Grace"	
2024	Outlander	Sissy Bertram	2 episodes	
2024	McDonald & Dodds	Lynn Wood	Episode: "Wedding Fever"	
2025	Code of Silence	DS Sara Burns	4 episodes	
2026	The Other Bennet Sister	Louisa Bingley/Hurst	6 episodes	
