= Core Medical Training =

Core Medical Training was the two-year part of postgraduate medical training following Foundation Year 1 and 2, successful completion of which is required to enter higher training in the medical subspecialties. The programme is overseen by the Joint Royal Colleges Postgraduate Training Board, which represents the three medical Royal Colleges in the UK: the Royal College of Physicians of London, the Royal College of Physicians of Edinburgh and the Royal College of Physicians and Surgeons of Glasgow.

Annual recruitment takes place centrally through a website-based application, followed by interviews held by regional Local Education and Training Boards.

Core medical training is one of the most popular medical specialties with over 2700 applicants applying for just over 1500 jobs each year. The ACCS (Acute Medicine) pathway also uses the core medical interview to recruit to ACCS. The application process is run by Oriel and applications open for roughly a month, towards the end of the year.

CMT rotations characteristically comprise 4- or 6-month placements in various medical specialties. Part of the programme should include posts where the trainee is involved in the "acute medical take" (assessing patients referred for acute admission to hospital) and to become competent in acute scenarios and procedures.

CMT doctors are CT1 or CT2 (first or second year, respectively). At three points in the programme they undergo a progress assessment called Annual Review of Competence Progression (ARCP). CMT doctors are expected to complete the Membership of the Royal College of Physicians (MRCP) exam, without which it is not possible to enter specialist training.

Technically, since Modernising Medical Careers, CMT doctors are called specialty registrars, although the term is usually reserved for those who have completed MRCP and commenced subspecialty training.

Core medical training was renamed Internal Medical Training in 2019 with IMT replacing the CMT syllabus.
