= Petra Letang =

British actress

- Born: 4 May 1979 (age 47); Plaistow, London, England
- Occupation: Actress
- Children: 2

Petra Letang (born 4 May 1979) is a British actress. She played Naomi Julien in the BBC soap opera EastEnders (2005–2007) and Adele Effanga in Holby City (2014–2016).

== Early life ==
Letang is from Plaistow, East London. She is of Dominican descent. She took acting classes at the Anna Scher Theatre school in Islington.

== Career ==
Letang played Donna Lewis in the Channel 5 soap Family Affairs in 1999, and the character Pauline in the BBC2 drama Babyfather in 2002. Other television credits have included Jonathan Creek (2004), The Bill (2005) and The Last Detective (2005). She also appeared in the British film Wondrous Oblivion in 2003.

In 2005, Letang was cast as Naomi Julien — the lesbian lover of Sonia Fowler (Natalie Cassidy) — in BBC's EastEnders. She left the role in 2007, reportedly because scriptwriters had "run out of ideas for her". Prior to this, Letang had gone public with her fears that her character would be axed following a "bad public reaction" to the lesbian storyline that saw Naomi break up the marriage of Sonia and Martin Fowler (James Alexandrou).

Letang went on to join the cast of Angie Le Mar's successful play, Funny Black Women On the Edge. It played at the Hackney Empire, East London, in the spring of 2007.

In March 2007, Letang was one of several television stars who took part in Searchlight magazine's "Hope Not Hate bus" campaign with the Daily Mirror, which was aimed at spreading a message of goodwill in the build-up to the local elections in May 2007. Letang commented: "This campaign is very close to my heart. We have to make a difference for the young people coming up."

Letang starred in Jason Barrett's film The Naked Poet in 2011, in which she played the lead female role Simone and gave what was described as a "stand out performance". She was also credited as both producer and one of the executive producers.

In 2013, Letang was cast in Holby City as healthcare assistant Adele Effanga. She is introduced as the sister of Mo Effanga (Chizzy Akudolu) and made her first appearance in January 2014.

== Personal life ==
As of 2015, Letang lived in Essex. She has a daughter.

== Filmography ==
=== Film ===
Year	Title	Role	Notes
2003	Wondrous Oblivion	Loretta Samuel	
2009	Normal: The Düsseldorf Ripper	Nurse Ann	
2012	Betsy & Leonard	Aisha	
2016	The Naked Poet	Simone	Also executive producer
2019	Weave Wars	Taryn	
2025	Grand Prix of Europe	Olivia (voice)	English version

=== Television ===
Year	Title	Role	Notes
1999	Family Affairs	Donna Lewis	
2001–2002	Babyfather	Pauline	5 episodes
2004	Jonathan Creek	Jessica	Episode: "The Chequered Box"
2005	The Bill	Charlene Gayle	2 episodes
2005	The Last Detective	Kayleigh	Episode: "Friends Reunited"
2005–2007	EastEnders	Naomi Julien	108 episodes
2013	Badults	Security Guard	Episode: "Film"
2014–2016	Holby City	Adele Effanga	90 episodes
2016	People Just Do Nothing	Tia	5 episodes
2017	Little Boy Blue	Protection Officer	Episode: "Episode #1.4"
2018–2020	Enterprice	Becky	
2019	The Reluctant Landlord	Mary	Episode: "Dreadlock Jeff"
2022	Death in Paradise	Mia Taylor	Series 11, Episode 1
