= Catherine Russell (British actress) =

British actress

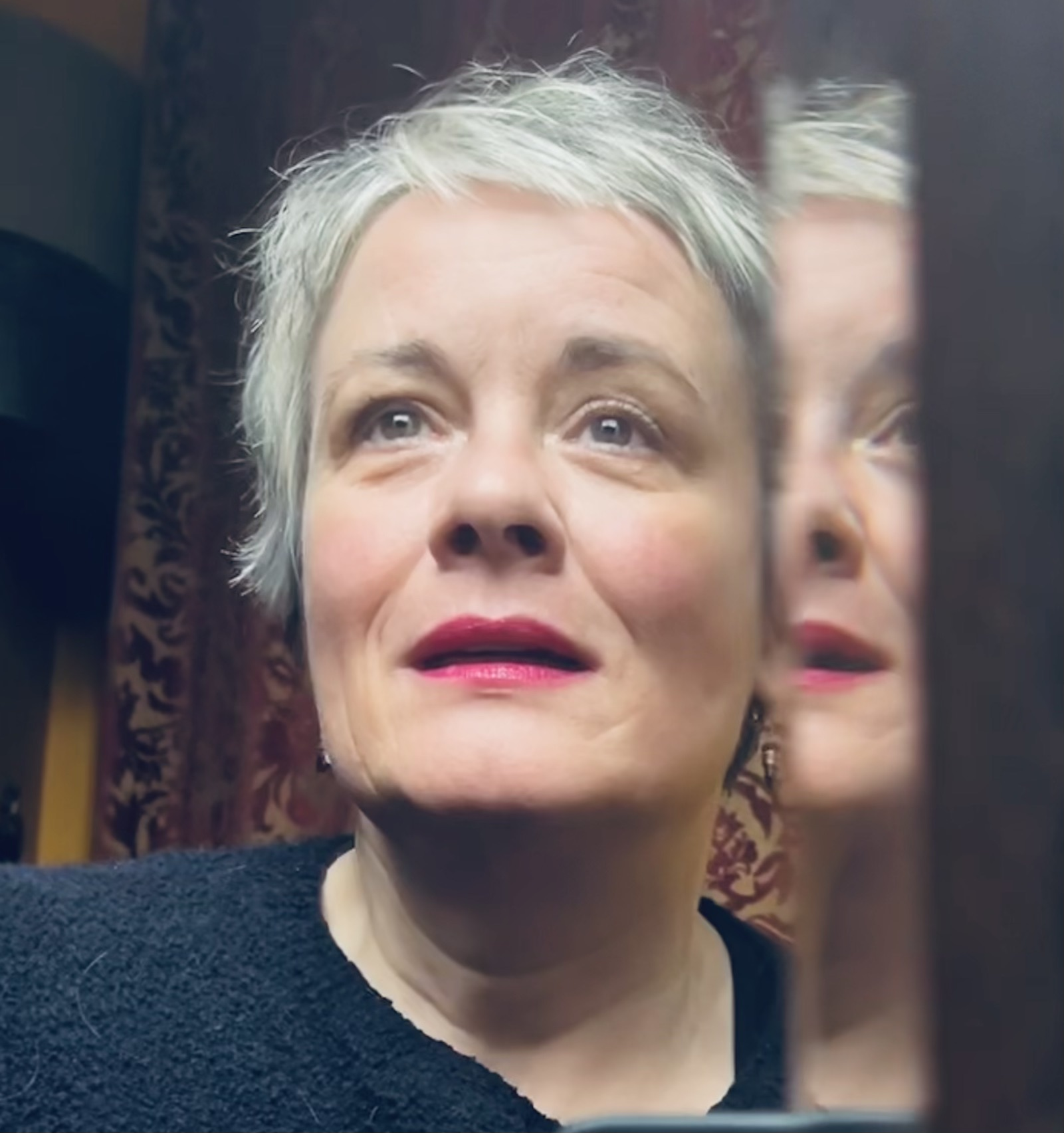
- Born: 17 April 1965 (age 61); Lambeth, London, England
- Education: Royal Central School of Speech and Drama
- Occupation: Actress
- Years active: 1986–present
- Spouse: Richard Holmes
- Children: 2
- Family: Mary Smith (mother); Nicholas Smith (father)

Catherine Russell (born 17 April 1965) is a British stage, television and screen actress.

== Personal life ==
Born as Catherine Smith, Russell's father was the actor Nicholas Smith, best known for playing Mr Rumbold in the BBC sitcom Are You Being Served. Her mother, Mary Smith, was a social worker. She trained at the Central School of Speech and Drama from 1983 to 1986 under George Hall.

She is married to film producer Richard Holmes whose films include Waking Ned, The Ritual, God's Own Country and Eden Lake. They have two children: Sam Russell-Holmes, an award winning radio producer and comedian who co-founded the highly successful improvisational troupe Shoot from the Hip, and Poppy Holmes, a singer/songwriter.

== Theatre ==
Russell was nominated for an Ian Charleson Award for her performance in Chekhov's Three Sisters. She has played leads in the West End, at the National, the Royal Court, Soho Theatre, Chichester Festival Theatre, Lyric, Almeida Theatre, the Royal Exchange, Manchester and the Menier Chocolate Factory.

Much of her previous work was with the acclaimed director Max Stafford-Clark for his theatre company Out of Joint where, as well as Masha in Three Sisters, she created roles such as Tess in Timberlake Wertenbaker's The Break of Day, Rima and Phoebe in Robin Soans' Talking to Terrorists, Mrs Peacham and Bett Rock in Stephen Jeffreys' The Convict's Opera and Hildy in Stella Feehily's Dreams of Violence. Other work includes Raina in Arms and the Man at The Royal Exchange Theatre; Shirley Hornett in Sailor, Beware! at the Lyric Theatre (Hammersmith); Maudlin in the Almeida Theatre production of A Chaste Maid in Cheapside; Aggie/Clodia in Nobel Prize winner Derek Walcott's The Last Carnival; Kevin Elyot's The Day I Stood Still, directed by the Ian Rickson for the Royal National Theatre and Mlle Guislaine de St.Euverte in The Waltz of the Toreadors opposite Peter Bowles, directed by Angus Jackson at the Chichester Festival. Her most recent roles include Nurse Ratched in One Flew Over the Cuckoo's Nest directed by Michael Buffong at the Curve Theatre in Leicester, Rosie in the West End production of Mamma Mia! and Mrs Prentice in Joe Orton's What The Butler Saw, also at the Curve Theatre, directed by Nikolai Foster. In 2022 Catherine played Muriel Wicksteed in Alan Bennett's Habeas Corpus at Menier Chocolate Factory directed by Patrick Marber.In Autumn 2023 she played Miss Havisham in the adaptation of Great Expectations by Tanika Gupta at the Royal Exchange theatre, Manchester. In 2024-2025 Catherine played Dolores Umbridge and Petunia Dursley in Harry Potter and the Cursed Child at the Palace Theatre in London's West End. Most recently she played Patricia Highsmith, to great critical acclaim, in Joanna Murray-Smith's two-hand play Switzerland at Theatre Royal, Bury St Edmunds.

== Television ==
Russell has starred in several television series including playing Hugh Bonneville's sister, Rachel Cazalet, in The Cazalets; Gemma Jones's daughter, Tish, in Chelworth; the title role of Elly Chandler in Chandler & Co with Barbara Flynn and subsequently Susan Fleetwood written by Paula Milne; Nathaniel Parker's wife, Helen, in The Inspector Lynley Mysteries and Martin Shaw's wife, Issy, in Always and Everyone. She appeared in series one and two of Pete versus Life. She played Consultant Surgeon Serena Campbell in the BBC medical drama Holby City, from May 2012 to January 2020 and again in February 2022. Other television includes guest appearances in Messiah, Agatha Christie's Poirot, Waking the Dead, Sherlock Holmes, Maigret, Silent Witness, Holding On and The Chelsea Detective.

== Film ==
Russell starred opposite Ian Hart in the film Clockwork Mice directed by Vadim Jean. She also made a comic, cameo appearance playing a colleague of Colin Firth's in Bridget Jones: The Edge of Reason directed by Beeban Kidron. Her other films include Solitaire for Two and Soft Top Hard Shoulder.
