= Rosie Marcel =

English actress (born 1977)

- Born: Rosie Ellen Celine Marcel; 6 May 1977 (age 49); Richmond, London, England
- Occupation: Actress
- Years active: 1981–2024
- Spouse: Ben Stacey (m. 2013)
- Children: 1
- Father: Terry Marcel
- Relatives: Kelly Marcel (sister)

Rosie Ellen Celine Marcel (born 6 May 1977) is an English retired actress. Marcel is known for her role as Jac Naylor, consultant cardiothoracic surgeon lead in the BBC drama series Holby City, a role she has also played in sister series Casualty. She is the daughter of television director Terry Marcel and sister of writer and actress Kelly Marcel.

== Career ==
Marcel describes herself as being from a "dramatic" family, and she had her first job at the age of three as a fairy in A Midsummer Nights Dream at the National Theatre. In 1985, she appeared in Bergerac as an abducted child, Michelle. In 1989, Marcel was cast as Sophie in the children's comedy drama Press Gang. Marcel played a sidekick to Paul Reynolds' character Colin Mathews. She enjoyed the experience, especially scenes in which she had to bite on sweets that made fake blood pour from her mouth. In 1999, Marcel played Donna Palmer in Days Like These, which was set in the 1970s. Marcel later recalled that during filming the show's dream sequences, she often had to dress up in "awful" outfits such as a cat suit donning Barbarella and a Union Jack Flag.

In November 2005, Marcel joined Holby City as Jac Naylor. Prior to this, she appeared in more than twenty episodes of The Bill, in which her character, Louise Larson, had an affair with Sergeant Dale Smith. It was revealed in the BBC's Annual Report for 2016 that Marcel was one of the BBC's highest-paid stars, with an annual salary for her role in Holby City in the range of £200,000 to £249,000, making her the highest-paid actor on the series. For her work in a 2019 storyline which sees Jac have a mental breakdown, the show put forward Marcel's name for BAFTA consideration although she did not ultimately receive a nomination. In January 2021, she announced her departure from the series after 16 years in the role. However, she returned four months later and remained with the show until its cancellation in 2022. Marcell won Best Drama Star at the Inside Soap Awards in 2019, 2021 and 2022. After two years of inactivity in the industry, she confirmed her retirement in 2024.

== Personal life ==
Marcel's mother, Lindsey Brook, was an actress and her father, Terry Marcel, is a television director; they divorced in 1995. Her older sister, Kelly, is a writer and actress who has appeared in both Holby City and The Bill, but is now best known as the writer and executive producer of the television series Terra Nova. They also have a younger brother, Luke.

When she was twenty years old, Marcel was diagnosed with endometriosis, and it was also discovered that she had a blood clotting disorder: "I was bleeding for about four months then I passed out in the shower and had to be rushed to hospital for an emergency blood transfusion. The doctors told me I'd almost bled to death and further tests revealed I had a blood clotting problem, the female form of haemophilia." Six years later she suffered further problems when she developed the rare condition Behçet's disease, an inflammatory disease in which the white blood cells attack healthy cells.

The disease left her almost bed-bound for two years until she was seen by an immunologist at St Bartholomew's Hospital in London, who diagnosed the condition and put her on immuno-suppressants. During the two-year period, Marcel was unable to walk unaided for approximately twelve months, instead relying on the use of two walking sticks. Speaking about the condition, Marcel said: "I have liver function and blood tests every three months. It's highly likely I'll die before [then-husband] Scott, but I'm coming to terms with that. It's worth it not to go back to the hell I was in for those two years. Untreated, Behçet's disease can affect your lungs, heart and blood vessels, so without the immuno-suppressants I might not be here now." In 2008, Marcel was diagnosed with cervical cancer, which had advanced to her pelvis and she had laser therapy to destroy the cancerous cells while continuing to film Holby City.

Marcel has a black belt in karate, which she mentioned when she revealed that she would like to be a stuntwoman: "I'd love the physical challenge of doing stunts. I went to a stuntman's ball with dad when I was 17 and I've been fascinated ever since. I'm a black-belt in karate and I love water-skiing. I also love bungee-jumping, which I could put to good use. I'm tougher than I look."

Marcel was married to television director Scott Bunce from 2004 to 2011. She married gym owner Ben Stacey in March 2013 in Las Vegas. In August 2014 Rosie announced her pregnancy, which they found out about two days before starting IVF treatment following months of trying to conceive and suffering a miscarriage. The miscarriage occurred just after she had finished filming the scenes in which her onscreen character, Jac Naylor, gave birth. She later announced that she was pregnant with a baby girl. She gave birth to her daughter on 21 January 2015. Due to Marcel's rare clotting disorder (known as storage pool disease), the baby, called Beau, was born via caesarian section.

== Filmography ==
- Holby City
- The Bill
- Nathan Barley
- Hotel Infinity
- The Vice
- Time Gentlemen Please
- The Secret World of Michael Fry
- Days Like These
- Casualty
- Growing Pains
- The Castle of Adventure
- Press Gang
- Hyper Sapien: People from Another Star
- Bergerac
- The Weather in the Streets
- HolbyBlue
- Venom: Let There Be Carnage
