= Holby City series 16 =

Holby City
- Series 16
- No. of episodes: 52

Release
- Original network: BBC One
- Original release: 15 October 2013 – 7 October 2014

Series chronology
- ← Previous; Series 15 Next → Series 17

The sixteenth series of the British medical drama television series Holby City commenced airing in the United Kingdom on BBC One on 15 October 2013. The series ran for 52 episodes.

== Episodes ==
No. overall	No. in series	Title	Directed by	Written by	Original release date	Viewers (millions)
684	1	"If I Needed Someone"	Graeme Harper	David Bowker	15 October 2013	4.04
Malick struggles to come terms with his hand injury, despite the support of his friends and colleagues. Serena takes over as CEO from the departed Hanssen. Elliot struggles to control his wild new mentee Zosia March (Camilla Arfwedson). Sacha confesses the truth about his kiss with Mo to a stunned Chrissie, putting their relationship in further risk.
685	2	"Friends Like You"	Graeme Harper	Helen Jenkins	22 October 2013	4.11
Harry endangers his reputation by helping an old friend on the ward, but its Gemma who ends up on the firing line when Ric blames her for the events that follow. Mo tries to heal things between her and Sacha, but things are made worse when Jonny discovers what happened, and is disapproving.
686	3	"Flesh is Weak"	James Larkin	Catherine Johnson	29 October 2013	4.92
Chantelle returns to work on the first day back since the terrible crash, and finds herself struggling to face her demons. Zosia and Elliot continue to clash when she acts out on her people skills once again. Mary-Claire attempts to pull the wool over Harry's eyes.
687	4	"Last Dance"	James Larkin	Simon Booker	5 November 2013	4.64
Malick struggles to resist the draw of a return to surgery, especially when an old icon of his arrives on Keller. The tension between Bonnie and Jac reaches breaking point. Chrissie and Sacha are determined that renewing their vows is the key to saving their marriage, but are they kidding themselves?
688	5	"'Arthur's Theme'"	David Innes Edwards	Dana Fainaru	12 November 2013	5.12
Chantelle reaches a crossroads in her life when Arthur and Cameron fight for her heart, and makes a big decision in the aftermath that surprises everyone. Mo struggles with another romance when her online date is admitted to hospital. As her treatment continues, Chrissie seeks solace in Michael instead of Sacha.
689	6	"Merry-Go-Round"	David Innes Edwards	Patrick Homes	19 November 2013	4.79
Following her betrayal of Sacha with Michael, Chrissie looks back at her past mistakes and bad decisions, realising her life has been one big disastrous merry-go-round at Holby. She finally looks inside herself to try to find what she needs; where will this lead her? Arthur tries to help Malick as he spirals out of control. Mo completely misses her 'mister right', preoccupied with her ex's dramas.
690	7	"Sink or Swim"	Tim Mercier	Jon Sen	26 November 2013	4.94
Malick is surprised to see his son Jake back working at Holby, but when a difficult case compromises them both, Malick has to choose between career and family once again. With her hands full, Serena fails to spot trouble from 'the powers that be', and before she knows it she finds herself demoted from top dog once again. Zosia attempts to prove herself on Darwin.
691	8	"Fait Accompli"	Tim Mercier	Johanne McAndrew and Elliot Hope	3 December 2013	3.46
New head honcho Guy Self (John Michie) descends on Holby, determined to change the hospital for the better, but ends up stepping on a few toes in the process, while Zosia wrestles with her demons following her father's arrival. Jonny lightens Jac's load, but finds himself with too much on his plate as a result. Serena deals with a smuggler on AAU. Newcomer Colette Sheward (Louise Delamere) also ruffles feathers.
692	9	"Heart of Hope"	Jamie Annett	Mark Stevenson	10 December 2013	4.47
Edward gets nasty with Mary-Claire when she threatens to expose their affair to Serena, showing his true colours to the shocked troublemaker. Elliot makes a bad decision which leaves Guy questioning his capabilities and the surgeon racked with guilt over his growing ego. Zosia helps Arthur escape his longing for Chantelle, and they end striking up a friendship.
693	10	"Father's Day"	Jamie Annett	Joe Ainsworth	17 December 2013	4.31
Michael risks his career to prove himself following Chrissie's rejection, and ends up in deep trouble with Guy as a result. Gemma questions whether she really belongs at Holby when she risks a patient's life. Jac helps Elliot escape his fears that Guy will dismiss him following his Hertzig mess-up. Edward turns on Mary-Claire, raising doubts about her medical capability to try to keep his affair with her out of Serena's earshot.
694	11	"All I Want for Christmas Is You"	Jon Sen	Julia Gilbert	24 December 2013	4.55
Mary-Claire declares war on Edward following his reconciliation with Serena, leaving his newfound happiness in danger and in the process revealing truths about his drink problem. Zosia puts aside her angst over her bad feeling with Guy to spend a Polish Christmas with Arthur, and is delighted to receive a gift from her mother. Mo may have found her right guy in Mr Thompson, who dresses up as Father Christmas to entertain the patients and the staff.
695	12	"Ring in the New"	Jon Sen	Julia Gilbert	31 December 2013	3.75
Guy and Zosia's problems reach breaking point as their professional and personal lives collide. Serena struggles to be brought back from the brink following the humiliation of last week with Edward, while Mary-Claire also struggles to let go of what has happened when Harry won't let it drop.
696	13	"Self Control"	Julie Edwards	Rebecca Wojciechowski	7 January 2014	5.04
The team on Darwin scramble into position when Jac begins to experience labour pains early; will the Ice Queen's baby arrive early? Serena questions her future when she comes face to face with a returned Edward. Ric reunites with a university flame, and reflects on his life choices as a result.
697	14	"Intuition"	Jennie Darnell	Lucia Haynes	14 January 2014	4.76
Colette finds herself under fire when questions are raised about her ability to run Holby's nursing, and she is furious when she discovers that Guy cut corners to get her her job. Dominic Copeland (David Ames) causes mischief once again on Keller, coming face to face with his old adversary Arthur. Another new arrival comes in the form of Mo's equally-troublesome sister Adele Effanga (Petra Letang), who arrives on AAU with a bang. Jac and Jonny's relationship is under strain as Emma's life hangs in the balance.
698	15	"Life After Life"	Jennie Darnell	Katie Douglas	21 January 2014	5.13
Jonny questions Jac's competency with Emma when she abandons her after her operation to be with a patient, but soon realises her desertion stems from her fears of being a bad mother. Arthur aims to sabotage Dominic, but ends up angering Sacha. Mo and Adele clash when Mo calls rank; can the sisters unite to be professional.
699	16	"Prince Among Men"	Amy Neil	Nick Fisher	28 January 2014	4.60
New dynamic registrar Raf Di Luca (Joe McFadden) arrives to shake up AAU, and his wayward techniques to save a patient in a dire way leaves the rest of the staff in awe of him. Sacha questions Zosia's dedication when she becomes distracted from her patient by a special project, bringing an age old mummy to Holby for a scan. Jac makes progress in realising just what motherhood means.
700	17	"Things We Lost in the Fire"	Amy Neil	Natalie Mitchell and Julia Gilbert	4 February 2014	4.98
The rivalry between Dom and Arthur is reaching breaking point. Harry tries to make Serena see that her attempts to prove herself to Guy are putting her job under strain. Now in her stride, Jac leaves Jonny behind with baby plans.
701	18	"Eat Your Heart Out"	Emma Sullivan	Nick Fisher	11 February 2014	4.78
Harry's jealousy towards Raf builds. Jac once again is torn between her work and personal life when Elliot asks her to deal with an intriguing case on the eve of Emma's christening. Serena and Zosia both face their issues with Guy when he is the only male available to help in surgery.
702	19	"Aftertaste"	Emma Sullivan	Kit Lambert	18 February 2014	4.97
Zosia's own vulnerabilities are exposed when she deals with a psychiatrically unstable patient. Harry also has a difficult patient in the form of returnee Annie. When Jac says that her larger paycheque enables her to overrule him for decisions about Emma, Jonny aims for a promotion to even the playing field.
703	20	"Anything You Can Do"	Richard Platt	Dana Fainaru	25 February 2014	4.75
Now the head of nursing on Darwin, Jonny struggles to juggle all of his responsibilities; can he prove himself? After the disastrous events of last week, Zosia is feeling vulnerable, but Guy is determined to help his daughter and tries to raise her spirits by arranging for her to help with transplant surgery. Raf calls Harry on his recent wayward behaviour.
704	21	"Instinct"	Richard Platt	Patrick Homes	4 March 2014	4.82
After making a fool of himself with Guy, Dominic attempts to prove himself but ends up lumped with a difficult patient. Bonnie is upset when Jonny is too busy to celebrate her birthday, and realises she needs to fight Jac and Emma for her man's attention. After a painful trip to see his daughter, Ric decides he needs to put his family first.
705	22	"Exit Strategy – Part One"	Jan Bauer	Robert Goldsbrough	11 March 2014	4.56
On the day of Jess' surgery, Ric attempts to step back from his role as a doctor to provide familial support, but can he trust Serena to do the operation? Guy feels the pressure following the withdrawal of funds. Bonnie tries to take her relationship with Jonny to the next level, but struggles with a manipulative Jac about.
706	23	"Exit Strategy – Part Two"	Jan Bauer	Joe Ainsworth	18 March 2014	4.75
Guy is shocked when Zosia backs a patient in a complaint against him, bringing their personal issues to a head in the professional field. Ric is neck deep in trouble when he covers for Jess after David's accident. Jonny is torn following his engagement to Bonnie - where does his heart really lie?
707	24	"Green Ink"	David Tucker	Paul Matthew Thompson	25 March 2014	4.85
New pharmacist Amy (Wendy Kweh) catches Harry's eye on AAU. Arthur and Dominic's war puts a patient in danger, leaving Sacha furious. Jonny falls out with Jac when she refuses to come to his and Bonnie's wedding and acts out at Bonnie's hen night.
708	25	"The Cruellest Month"	David Tucker	Martin Jameson	1 April 2014	4.26
Jonny and Bonnie's wedding day hits troubled waters when Jac forces Jonny into theatre and Bonnie's brother is admitted to the ward. Will Jonny go ahead and marry Bonnie, or will he admit his true feelings for Jac? Zosia struggles to hold it together on the anniversary of her mother's death. With the news that Connie Beauchamp (Amanda Mealing) has taken over the ED (Casualty), Serena is determined not to be left behind.
709	26	"The Win"	Graeme Harper	Bede Blake	8 April 2014	4.52
Raf and Amy's marriage makes Harry uncomfortable, but later when he works with Amy, he realises their marriage is not as harmonious as it first seems. Dominic and Zosia's friendship is threatened when he tries to impress Sacha. Jonny struggles to cope in the aftermath of Bonnie's death, and Jac is devastated when he blames her for what has happened; and threatens to take her to court for custody of Emma as a result. Note: This episode is dedicated to Rashik Vaka, one of the longest serving background artistes.
710	27	"Cold Heart, Warm Hands"	Graeme Harper	Nick Fisher	15 April 2014	4.38
Amy is devastated when she learns another course of IVF fails, and feels further upset when Raf fails to provide her with the support she needs. Arthur attempts to get to the bottom of Dominic's skittishness with Kevin. Elliot has to play peacemaker when Jac and Jonny's custody battle explodes onto the ward.
711	28	"Battle Lines"	Jo Johnson	Julia Gilbert	22 April 2014	4.88
Desperate to win Emma in the custody battle, Jac uses her dirtiest trick yet, leaving her to face her oldest and worst demon. Arthur attempts to impress Guy and new anesthetist Jesse Law (Don Gilet), but pushes away his friends in trying to do so. Mo receives a nasty surprise amongst her arguing with Adele.
712	29	"Wild Child"	Jo Johnson	David Bowker (writer)	29 April 2014	4.56
Raf and Amy face another blow on their IVF journey, and question what they really want. Jac struggles with her mother's presence on Darwin; can she trust her mother. Zosia tries to forget a disastrous date.
713	30	"My Name Is Joe"	Pip Short	Johanne McAndrew and Elliot Hope	6 May 2014	4.52
Zosia tries to prove to Sacha that she has learnt from past mistakes. Jonny is furious with the latest development in the custody battle, but the tide changes when he finds himself an unusual ally in Jac's mother. Sick of Arthur's success, Dominic attempts to prove that he is just as good as his rival, but ends up lumped with a difficult case on AAU.
714	31	"No Apologies"	Pip Short	Anna McPartlin	13 May 2014	4.69
Sacha tries to keep his junior doctors in line when they ask questions about a patient with a dodgy past, but ends up putting his career on the line himself. Jonny tries to make amends with Jac after the events of last week. Adele and Mo clash again when Adele assumes Mo's identity on a local radio show.
715	32	"Keeping Mum"	Richard Signy	Joe Ainsworth	22 May 2014	4.27
Serena's overbearing mother Adrienne is readmitted to Keller, and when she also gets herself wrapped up in a patient's paternity issues, she ends up trapped between her personal and professional lives once again. Elliot worries about memory issues, and the Darwin team fail to soothe his anxieties. Adele sets out to prove herself as a member of the team but Mo refuses to cut her any slack.
716	33	"Crush"	Hugh Quarshie	Glen Laker	27 May 2014	3.73
Amy is determined to keep her night with Harry a secret from Raf, but later everything is turned upside down when she discovers that she is pregnant at last. Serena has to face some truths about her mother's conditions. In escaping Mo, Adele finds herself in Jac's firing line.
717	34	"Collateral"	Jamie Annett	Dana Fainaru	3 June 2014	4.03
Guy gives Amy an opt-out to dealing with working with Harry following the discovery that she is pregnant, but she decides to tackle her problems herself. Adele gives Mo some home truths about her new celebrity status when she forgets their mother's birthday. After clashing with her father again, Zosia grows close to Jesse and they share a flirtatious kiss.
718	35	"Masquerade"	Jamie Annett	Lucia Haynes	10 June 2014	4.00
Amy makes a painful decision and sacrifices escaping Harry in the process. Elliot babysits Emma with disastrous consequences, so Jonny has to come to the rescue and sacrifices his career dreams in the process. Arthur is jealous of Zosia and Jesse's romance, but ends up finding a woman of his own.
719	36	"Little Star"	Julie Edwards	Julia Gilbert	19 June 2014	2.31
Jac and Jonny finally face off for Emma in court, but her plans are placed in disarray when a face from her past returns. Desperate, Jac seeks solace in her dying mother. Sacha receives bad publicity when the news that he treated a Nazi war hero.
720	37	"Every Dog Has Its Day"	James Larkin	Nick Fisher	26 June 2014	3.87
Raf is suspicious when he realises that Harry's story is different to his as they head into Amy's hearing, and later the truth comes flying out, leaving Amy and Raf's marriage in tatters. Elliot hides from worrying medical symptoms and his spat with Jac. Colette realises that Jesse and Zosia are having an affair, and confronts Jesse, warning him that Guy won't take the news well.
721	38	"All Before Them"	James Larkin	Kate Verghese	30 June 2014	3.78
Harry and Amy receive Raf's anger as his personal feelings about the affair collide with their work. Zosia puts her relationship in danger, while Jesse has his own doubts with Colette's words ringing in his ears. Worried about his mortality, Elliot hands the Hertzig project over to Mo, but soon gets drawn back into his work.
722	39	"Captive"	John Hardwick	Lauren Klee	9 July 2014	3.30
Originally trying to keep his relationship with Zosia a secret, Jesse realises just how erratic her behaviour has become and makes a desperate attempt to opt out. Raf shocks Amy by telling her that no matter whether her baby is his or Harry's, he wants to be with her. Mo tries to stop Jonny from leaving Holby for Scotland, realising that she needs him as much as he needs her.
723	40	"'The Spirit...'"	John Hardwick	Chris Lindsay	15 July 2014	3.74
Elliot's life work comes under threat when his health issues come to the forefront in theatre; what is really wrong with Elliot? Serena hides her mother on the ward, but finds herself in trouble when Guy discovers what she is up to. Zosia seeks solace in Arthur following Jesse's departure, while Dominic makes Arthur think about his recent selfishness.
724	41	"A Heart Man"	Jennie Darnell	Rebecca Wojciechowski	22 July 2014	3.75
Elliot has to make big decisions about his upcoming brain surgery and his future at Holby. Raf struggles when he is asked to help Harry advance with his career; can he really put Harry's affair with Amy behind him? Jac tries to protect Elliot when a Hertzig patient claims he has been negligent, but it also benefits her as Guy puts forward the idea that Jac should lead Darwin from now on.
725	42	"One Small Step"	Jennie Darnell	Alex Child	29 July 2014	3.50
It's the end of term for the young doctors, and Arthur struggles to control Dominic and Zosia. The day ends with disastrous consequences, as Arthur risks his career to save Zosia's life when she drinks too much. Raf comes to realise the importance of family when his brother arrives on the ward, and the ice between him and Harry also begins to thaw as they team up to find out what is wrong with him. With Elliot recovering on the ward, Guy gives Jac the news that Connie Beauchamp will be her assistant on a complex operation, leading Jac to think again about usurping Elliot to become head of Darwin.
726	43	"Affair of the Mind"	Amy Neil	Johanne McAndrew and Elliot Hope	5 August 2014	3.98
Serena desperately tries to hold her life together as Adrienne deteriorates, and Guy orders her to make a decision about where to draw the line between her professional and personal lives. After last week's events, Zosia is sent on another downward spiral when Arthur cannot trust her with the treatment of his girlfriend when she is brought onto the ward. Jonny, Adele and Mr Thompson pull out all the stops to get Mo smiling again.
727	44	"Star Crossed Lovers"	Amy Neil	Claire Bennett	12 August 2014	4.04
Fletch arrives on the wards of Holby and is determined for a fresh start, however Collete is less than happy when she discovers he is her new nurse. With their past bubbling back to the surface can a patient bring them back together? Elliot is delighted to finally be operating again but when a patient refuses to let him operate he is soon reminded of his recent illness.
728	45	"The Art of Losing"	Daniel Wilson	Katie Douglas	19 August 2014	3.89
Jac's news spreads throughout the department swiftly and as Elliot discovers he will no longer be responsible for the Herzig he begins to question if he can forgive the person he trusted with his life's work during his illness. Fletch becomes keen to show Colette his superior management style but new nurse Kirsty's (Helen Flanagan) arrival on AAU becomes sure to ruffle some feathers. Essie and Sacha remain in their honeymoon phase which Dominic is more than happy about, but will the speed of the relationship lead to a block in their relationship?
729	46	"'Going, Going...'"	Daniel Wilson	Joe Ainsworth	26 August 2014	4.18
Arthur is delighted when Guy trusts him with a VIP patient, but Zosia's intervention creates tension between the pair. Amy is irritated when Raf deliberately bids higher than Harry on a vintage convertible car, while Serena becomes uncomfortable around Harry's father, Billy.
730	47	"The Looking Glass"	Richard Platt	Kate Verghese	2 September 2014	4.18
Raf remains detached from Amy and the baby after a car incident outside the hospital reveals the sex of her baby. Meanwhile, Sacha becomes convinced that Essie is hiding something, and when she reveals she still hasn't yet come to terms with her grandfather's loss he decides she needs to go to Germany and meet her family, forcing her to make a huge decision. Elliot decides to betray Jac's orders.
731	48	"'Hoops'"	Richard Platt	Fiona Peek	9 September 2014	4.20
Sacha welcomes a newly promoted Arthur on his first day of his new role, but then his anxiety over Zosia brings him face to face with Guy. Jac is unimpressed as Adele's determination to prove herself results in a patient almost dying. Fletch struggles to keep control on AAU which deeply concerns Ric, but finds support from an unexpected source.
732	49	"Forgive Me Father"	Jamie Annett	Nick Fisher	16 September 2014	4.17
Raf decides to give Harry a chance in the spotlight, but the nurse's nature gets the better of him when a chance to undermine and ruin Harry's career shines through. Guy is worried about Zosia and asks Amy to carry out an informal assessment. Adele and Jonny decide to mix work with pleasure. Note: This episode is dedicated to Clare Cathcart.
733	50	"Mummy Dearest"	Jamie Annett	Nick Fisher, Johanne McAndrew and Elliot Hope	23 September 2014	3.83
Serena admits her mother in hopes she can work professionally without worrying, however the day ends dramatically as Adrienne becomes aggressive towards members of staff. Jac attempts to build bridges with Elliot but ends up angering him. Dom finds the possibility of romance.
734	51	"Inside Out"	Jan Bauer	Anna McPartlin	30 September 2014	4.13
Harry's hearing arrives but a vengeful Raf remains insistent on ruining the young man's career - but after a day from hell Raf ends up admitting the truth, much to Harry's delight. Elliot makes plans to retire but Adele sees otherwise. Dom makes a surprise encounter with Kyle again.
735	52	"True Colours"	Jan Bauer	Jon Sen	7 October 2014	3.69
Harry returns to AAU where he is surprised to find comfort in a familiar face, Mary-Claire. Zosia ignores a patient's wishes leaving Dominic and Arthur worried about their futures. Colette faces some home truths. Jac is quick to inform Guy on Elliot's new project, putting it at risk.

== Production ==
The series is produced by the BBC and will air on BBC One and BBC One HD in the United Kingdom. Oliver Kent is the executive producer. Simon Harper is the series producer.

== Cast ==
=== Overview ===
All of the main characters carried over from the previous series, with the exception of director of surgery and chief executive officer Henrik Hanssen (Guy Henry), who left the hospital to return to Sweden. Staff nurse Chantelle Lane (Lauren Drummond) left in episode 5. Long-serving Chrissie Williams (Tina Hobley) left in episode 6. New chief executive officer and director of surgery, neurosurgeon Guy Self (John Michie) joined as of episode 7 followed quickly by director of nursing Colette Sheward (Louise Delamere) in episode 8. Both Antoine Malick (Jimmy Akingbola) and his son, Jake Patterson (Louis Payne) left in episode 7. Junior doctor Gemma Wilde (Ty Glaser) departed in episode 10, along with general surgeon Michael Spence (Hari Dhillon), who left for an "extended break from the series". Consultant anesthetist Edward Campbell (Aden Gillett) left the show after episode 13. Both Dominic Copeland (David Ames) and Adele Effanga (Petra Letang) arrived in episode 14, Ames having appeared as a recurring character in the previous series. Raffaello "Raf" di Lucca (Joe McFadden) arrived in episode 16. Raf's wife, Amy Teo (Wendy Kweh) also joined the team as consultant pharmacist on AAU from episode 24. Bonnie Wallis (Carlyss Peer) was killed off on her wedding day in episode 25. Jesse Law (Don Gilet) joined the team as a consultant anesthetist on Keller from episode 28 then left in episode 39. Adrian Fletcher arrived in episode 44. Essie Harrison (Kaye Wragg) arrived in episode 30 then left in episode 47. Sam Stockman reprised his role as Elliot's son, James Hope in episode 41, having previously appeared as a recurring character between 2006 and 2007.

=== Main characters ===
- Jimmy Akingbola as Antoine Malick (until episode 7)
- Chizzy Akudolu as Mo Effanga
- David Ames as Dominic Copeland (from episode 14)
- Camilla Arfwedson as Zosia March
- Bob Barrett as Sacha Levy
- Paul Bradley as Elliot Hope
- Louise Delamere as Colette Sheward (from episode 8)
- Hari Dhillon as Michael Spence (until episode 10)
- Lauren Drummond as Chantelle Lane (until episode 5)
- Aden Gillett as Edward Campbell (until episode 13)
- Ty Glaser as Gemma Wilde (until episode 10)
- Tina Hobley as Chrissie Williams (until episode 6)
- Jules Knight as Harry Tressler
- Petra Letang as Adele Effanga (from episode 14)
- Rosie Marcel as Jac Naylor
- Joe McFadden as Raf di Lucca (from episode 16)
- Niamh McGrady as Mary-Claire Carter (until episode 28, from episode 52)
- John Michie as Guy Self (from episode 7)
- Rob Ostlere as Arthur Digby
- Hugh Quarshie as Ric Griffin (until episode 23, episodes 43−49)
- Catherine Russell as Serena Campbell
- Michael Thomson as Jonny Maconie
- Alex Walkinshaw as Fletch (from episode 44)

=== Recurring and guest characters ===
- Jotham Annan as Nathan Hargreave (until episode 4)
- Tom Beard as Jeremy Solis (episodes 14−16)
- Don Gilet as Jesse Law (episodes 28−39)
- Ben Hull as Derwood "Mr T" Thompson
- Wendy Kweh as Amy Teo (from episode 24)
- Amanda Mealing as Connie Beauchamp (episode 42)
- Alan Morrissey as Kyle Greenham (from episode 50)
- Louis Payne as Jake Patterson (episodes 1−7)
- Carlyss Peer as Bonnie Wallis (until episode 25)
- Sam Stockman as James Hope (episode 41)
- Kaye Wragg as Essie Harrison (episodes 30−47)
- Sandra Voe as Adrienne McKinnie
