= Holby City series 17 =

Holby City
- Series 17
- No. of episodes: 52

Release
- Original network: BBC One; BBC One HD
- Original release: 14 October 2014 – 6 October 2015

Series chronology
- ← Previous; Series 16 Next → Series 18

The seventeenth series of the British medical drama television series Holby City commenced airing in the United Kingdom on BBC One on 14 October 2014 and ran for 52 episodes, ending on 6 October 2015. The series saw the returns of Oliver Valentine (James Anderson), Henrik Hanssen (Guy Henry), and Essie Harrison (Kaye Wragg). Former series regular Hari Dhillon returned as Michael Spence for a six-episode guest arc. Former cast member Olga Fedori reprised her role as Frieda Petrenko for a guest appearance.

The series also saw several actors leave. Louise Delamere (Colette Sheward) made her exit in the fourth episode, later followed by Jules Knight (Harry Tressler) and Niamh McGrady (Mary-Claire Carter). Michael Thomson (Jonny Maconie) departed in episode 27, along with Rosie Marcel (Jac Naylor), who made a temporary departure to have her first child. Towards the end of September, the series saw the departure of one of the longest serving characters Elliot Hope (Paul Bradley).

== Production ==
The series began airing on Tuesday nights on BBC One from 14 October 2014. Oliver Kent was the executive producer of the show, while Simon Harper served as the series producer.

The series saw the return of Hari Dhillon as Michael Spence for six episodes, while Debbie Chazen was introduced as consultant Fleur Fanshawe for a three-month guest stint. Of her casting, Chazen commented, "I am thrilled to be joining Holby as the outrageous Fleur – she's going to be a lot of fun to play! I can't wait to stir things up on Keller Ward and am looking forward to being able to tell my family that I'm a doctor at last." Dhillon and Chazen made their appearances in the first episode of the series "'Not Waving But Drowning'". The second episode of the series saw a guest appearance from actress Wanda Ventham as Myrtle McKee, a patient who is treated by Dominic Copeland (David Ames). Myrtle is "an older lady of voracious appetites who leads a double life, meeting the needs of her husband before scurrying off to see her lover."

In October 2014, it was announced that Louise Delamere, who plays Colette Sheward, would be leaving the show. Delamere made the decision to leave "of her own accord" and Colette departed in the fourth episode on 4 November. The fourth episode also saw guest appearances from Antony Costa and Georgia Moffett, as Matthew Pendleton and Briony Whitman, following their debuts in Holby City's sister show Casualty on 1 November 2014. The fifth episode featured a storyline that helped commemorate the centenary of the beginning of World War I. Nina Toussaint-White also made her first appearance as Sophia Verlaine, an agency nurse and Fleur's love interest. Actress Anita Dobson guest starred as a terminally ill patient named Betty in the tenth episode. Betty played "a pivotal role" in Zosia March's (Camilla Arfwedson) ongoing mental health storyline.

This series saw the returns of Henrik Hanssen (Guy Henry), Oliver Valentine (James Anderson) and Essie Harrison (Kaye Wragg). Henrik and Oliver were last seen in 2013, while Essie appeared on a recurring basis in 2014. She became a regular cast member upon her return in episode 26. Henrik returns to the hospital after deciding that he wants to "bring his surgical brilliance back to Holby." Henry expressed his delight at reprising his role, saying "I'm so pleased to be reunited with Mr. Hanssen. He's such a weird and wonderful character to play - I've missed him! And the cast and crew at Holby are such fun to work with - I've missed them too." While Anderson was equally pleased to be back and said there would be "lots of surprises in store" for Oliver. Oliver made his full-time return on 5 May 2015.

The series' first standalone episode was broadcast on 6 January 2015, and focused on the Effanga sisters Mo (Chizzy Akudolu) and Adele (Petra Letang). They attended a family wedding, where a shared secret impacted on their futures. Actress Angela Wynter began her semi-regular role as Ina Effanga, the mother of Mo and Adele, during the standalone episode. The following month, it was announced that Nina Wadia had joined the cast as neurosurgeon Annabelle Cooper. Wadia will make her first of five appearances from 21 April (episode 28). February also saw Jules Knight (who plays Harry Tressler) confirm his departure. Knight left to concentrate on his music career. Harry and Mary-Claire Carter (Niamh McGrady) departed in the 27th episode "Go the Distance" on 14 April 2015. On 4 April 2015, it was announced that Michael Thomson (Jonny Maconie) had left Holby City. He departed in episode 27, along with Rosie Marcel (Jac Naylor), who made a temporary exit for maternity leave, although they both made a guest appearance in episode 37.

On 26 May 2015, it was announced former EastEnders actress Gillian Wright was to guest star as "troublesome" patient Lydia Rathbone during the episode broadcast on 2 June. New nurse Cara Martinez (Niamh Walsh) made her debut during episode 36 which was broadcast on 16 June. Two episodes later, Eleanor Fanyinka was introduced as new Foundation Year 1 doctor Morven Shreve. Towards the end of the series, during episode 50, Elliot Hope (played by Paul Bradley) departed the show after ten years. His exit was kept a secret to surprise viewers. The show's executive producer Oliver Kent commented, "We all adore Elliot Hope and we will miss him like crazy. Paul has been a fabulous member of the Holby City family for 10 years, and we thank him from the bottom of our hearts for all his incredible work."

== Reception ==
The first episode of the series attracted an overnight audience of 4.64 million, with a 22.4% share in its time slot, making it the show's highest rating since 13 May 2014. This was surpassed in January 2015, when episode thirteen of the series attracted an overnight audience of 5.09 million, with a 23.4% share in its time slot, making it the show's highest figure since January 2014.

A Liverpool Daily Post journalist praised Catherine Russell (Serena Campbell) and Sandra Voe (Adrienne McKinnie) for their performances during Adrienne's dementia storyline, saying they had "put us all through the emotional wringer for months". Flynn Sarler from the Radio Times gave the thirteenth episode "Brand New You" a mixed review. Sarler thought that the issue of mental health was important, but the only emotion Guy and Zosia incited was boredom. While he liked the Effanga wedding storyline, branding it "much more fascinating". Sarler noted that the 26th episode "Squeeze the Pips" was "for those who want to see nurse Jonny Maconie finally get something he wants". He also found Guy's discomfort around Jonny "a joy to watch".

The show's production and editorial teams were nominated for the Achievement in Production accolade at the 2014 Creative Diversity Awards. Holby City was nominated for Best Drama at the 2015 Inside Soap Awards. The show also received a nomination in the Soaps and Continuing Series category at the Mind Media Awards for Zosia's bipolar storyline. The fiftieth episode, "At First I was Afraid" by Julia Gilbert earned a nomination in the Best Long Running TV Series category at the 2016 Writers' Guild of Great Britain Awards.

== Episodes ==
No. overall	No. in series	Title	Directed by	Written by	Original release date	Viewers (millions)
736	1	"'Not Waving But Drowning'"	Griff Rowland	Julia Gilbert	14 October 2014	4.59
Raf returns to AAU following his suspension. Michael Spence also returns to the hospital, while new consultant Fleur Fanshawe makes her presence felt on Keller when she clashes with Sacha over a patient. Jac is confronted with her daughter and she struggles with her emotions when a patient gives birth on the ward.
737	2	"Bounce Back"	Griff Rowland	Nick Fisher	21 October 2014	4.40
Suffering from a lack of confidence, Raf struggles to deal with a difficult procedure, but support from Fletch helps him to bounce back. Guy and Jac clash over a patient when it becomes clear that they will both have to operate him in order to save his life. Dominic and Kyle's relationship comes to a halt when Dom suspects Kyle is cheating on him, but he soon realises that he has misread the situation.
738	3	"The Science of Imaginary Solutions"	Karl Neilson	Robert Goldsbrough	28 October 2014	4.46
Jesse Law returns to Holby, as the consultant anaesthetist on Darwin. His first case is operating with Mo, who is out to prove herself by using an experimental technique. Serena's mother, Adrienne, is readmitted with pneumonia after going missing. On the ward, Serena's daughter discovers the true extent of her grandmother's illness. Sacha becomes desperate to prove Fleur wrong, but a surprise comes both their ways as they end up working on a case together.
739	4	"Chaos in Her Wings"	Karl Neilson	Kate Verghese	4 November 2014	4.49
Colette's loyalties are tested as Zosia spirals out of control straining her relationship with Guy, and after a day from hell Colette makes a decision regarding her future at Holby. Raf finds himself in trouble when Michael discovers he kissed his patient's fiancée. Adele initially suspects Jesse is spying for Guy, but they grow closer as they help a patient.
740	5	"'We Must Remember This'"	Richard Platt	Joe Ainsworth, Elliot Hope and Johanne McAndrew	11 November 2014	4.59
Michael and Fleur compete against each other to diagnose a patient who is constantly arresting, but at the end of the day it appears the competition against the surgeons is more than professional. An old soldier helps repair the strained relationship between Serena and Adrienne. Mo is impressed when she and Jesse successfully perform a transplant.
741	6	"Severed"	Richard Platt	Joe Ainsworth	18 November 2014	4.27
Adrienne asks Serena to help her end her life. Serena initially refuses, but later agrees that Adrienne is lucid enough to sign a DNR. Shortly after, Adrienne suffers a stroke and dies, leaving Serena devastated. Meanwhile, Adele struggles to balance her career and her coursework. Michael tries to extend his time at Holby, and he and Fleur work together on a double limb reattachment. After the successful operation, Michael ultimately decides to return to the US.
742	7	"'Flesh and Blood'"	Daniel Wilson	Jamie Crichton	25 November 2014	4.12
Guy collects Zosia from the health clinic and presumes she is ready to work on the wards again. However, Guy faces a setback as Zosia loses control, forcing him to ask for a psyche assessment for his daughter. Elliot asks Jac for funding to enable him to build a prototype for his new device. She initially refuses, until she comes up with a solution. Serena reveals her feelings about her mother's death to Raf.
743	8	"I Am What I Am Not"	Daniel Wilson	Chris Lindsay	2 December 2014	3.42 (Note: Not reported in the weekly top 30 programmes for BBC One, so an overnight viewing figure is provided instead.)
Zosia attempts to demonstrate that she is able to perform on the wards, despite being on medication. But when her friend from the psyche unit, Lisa, arrives at the hospital, she convinces Zosia to stop taking her lithium tablets. Zosia begins treating a male patient, but misses vital signs and misdiagnoses him. Lisa begins hyperventilating in reception, requiring treatment from Jesse, but when she reveals she is faking her symptoms, Jesse discharges her – unaware of her unstable condition. Serena clashes with Angus Farrell, a chairman from the hospital board determined to introduce vicious cost-cutting proposals.
744	9	"Estel"	Jamie Annett	Patrick Homes	9 December 2014	4.23
A 2-day-old baby with CDH is transferred to AAU, so she can receive ECMO therapy ahead of surgery. As Raf and Harry's working relationship improves, Raf asks Amy for a divorce. Amy goes into labour and delivers a son via caesarean, but she soon begins haemorrhaging. Dom tries to impress Fleur, so he will be asked to join her Los Angeles team, but Zosia's patient has the potential to harm his chances. Elsewhere, Mo struggles with her feelings for Jesse, while Jac kisses Guy.
745	10	"Star of Wonder"	Jamie Annett	Julia Gilbert	16 December 2014	4.43
Zosia becomes emotionally involved with an elderly female patient, who entrusts her with many secrets. But when she attempts to decode everything she has been given, including a necklace, she becomes insistent her mother's spirit is inside her patient. Mo rejects Mr. Thompson as she decides to tell Jesse how she feels, but then witnesses him kissing Adele. Amy gets a paternity test, which reveals Harry is Callum's biological father. Amy later shocks Harry when she announces she is planning on moving back to Singapore.
746	11	"I Will Honour Christmas in My Heart"	Steve Brett	Johanne McAndrew and Elliot Hope	23 December 2014	4.48
Oliver Valentine returns to Holby, but he is not in a good way having been attacked by a group of youths outside the hospital. Once inside, Jac and Elliot treat him for chest pains, caused by Chagas disease. Elliot realises Oliver needs an operation – although it is made tricky when he discovers Oliver is also suffering from cirrhosis of the liver. Determined not to let this discourage him, Elliot decides to push ahead and use his new device, despite Jac's refusal. Later, Jac allows him to use the device, even suggesting he calls it Kibo. The operation is a success. Meanwhile, Ric returns to AAU, but is shocked to learn Amy has handed in her resignation. Guy struggles to accept Zosia may never be the same again.
747	12	"Should Auld Acquaintance Be Forgot"	Steve Brett	Tony Higgins	30 December 2014	4.78
Dom returns from LA and Serena and Ric are shocked to learn that three complaints were made against him during his time there. The pair warn Dom that he needs to put in more effort. Dom's day takes a turn for the worse, when Malick's fiancé, Nathan, is admitted after being knocked off his bike. Dom and Nathan become trapped in the lift, and Dom is forced to act swiftly in order to save Nathan's life. Meanwhile, Mo treats a surrogate mother diagnosed with angina, who discovers that she needs an operation on her heart if she has a chance of surviving the birth. After struggling to find a date to her sister's wedding, Mo settles on Mr T. Mary-Claire and Harry decide to spend New Year's Eve together.
748	13	"Brand New You"	Nigel Douglas	Rebecca Wojciechowski	6 January 2015	5.08
The Effanga family prepare themselves for Celia's wedding day. Mo and Adele bring Mr T and Jesse as their escorts. During the reception, Mo's mother reveals an explosive family secret. Zosia's friend Lisa is brought in with a head injury after jumping from a bridge, prompting Zosia's return to Keller. Guy finally accepts his daughter's mental illness.
749	14	"Wages of Sin"	John Hardwick	Johanne McAndrew and Elliot Hope	13 January 2015	5.09
Sacha struggles to take a step back when his daughter, Rachel, is admitted. He is further shocked to learn she has traces of amphetamines in her system. Harry and Mary-Claire work together on a tricky case and agree to a friends with benefits relationship. Jac is offered a job opportunity in the United States, while Mo is tasked with her first solo Herzig operation.
750	15	"Sucker Punch"	John Hardwick	Martin Jameson	20 January 2015	4.79
Fletch's ex-wife Natalie and her friend Bex are brought into AAU after a drunken night out. Fletch later realises that Natalie's condition is far worse than he first thought and she later dies after surgery. Rachel sits a mock exam in the hospital, but her continuing sickness has Sacha worried. After conducting more tests, Arthur informs Rachel that she is pregnant. Elsewhere, Jonny tries to convince a monk to accept treatment, while dealing with the changes Guy has made to the theatre schedules.
751	16	"Good Girls Don't Lie"	Karl Neilson	Kit Lambert	27 January 2015	4.90
Mary-Claire tries to keep her relationship with Harry casual, but while they work together to diagnose a patient's condition, she realises that she has developed feelings for him. Sacha tries to be there for Rachel, but seeks help from her teacher, Mr Kerrigan. He soon works out that Mr Kerrigan is the father of Rachel's baby. When he tries to report him to the police, Rachel threatens to cut Sacha out of her life. Meanwhile, Adele suspects Mo has been avoiding her due to her feelings for Jesse, but soon learns that they are not sisters.
752	17	"The Beat Goes On"	Karl Neilson	Joe Ainsworth	3 February 2015	4.99
Jonny is stuck in the middle of two warring parents when they cannot agree to donate their son's organs. Fletch promotes Mary-Claire for the day and she grows close to Pat, a homeless man, with serious injuries. Mary-Claire is later blamed for revealing details about the organ donor to a heart and lung recipient. When Pat dies, Mary-Claire is left questioning her relationship with Harry when he says no one will miss him. Elsewhere, Sacha forgets Rachel's birthday and enlists Dom's help in a bid to make it up to her.
753	18	"Love Divided by Three"	James Larkin	Matthew Broughton	10 February 2015	4.93
Triplets with a rare blood type bring problems to the wards when two of them need surgery. Rachel leaves the hospital to meet Mr Kerrigan, but collapses when her condition takes a turn for the worse. She later miscarries during surgery. Harry realises he has strong feelings for Mary-Claire, but learns that she is seeing someone else. Ma Effanga comes to the hospital to apologise to Mo and to give her a box of photos and papers, which may contain the identity of her real father.
754	19	"Be Bold, Be Bold"	James Larkin	Catherine Johnson	17 February 2015	4.98
While treating an agitated patient named James, Mary-Claire bonds with him over their relationship problems. James later holds Mary-Claire hostage in a store cupboard, demanding that she cut off a tattoo on his chest. When Mr. Kerrigan turns up at the hospital to see Rachel, Sacha punches him and tries to find a way to keep him and Rachel apart. Meanwhile, after seeing how badly the new theatre schedules are affecting the staff, Jonny begins a petition. But a patient ensures that his campaign goes viral.
755	20	"Domino Effect"	Dermot Boyd	Katie Douglas	24 February 2015	4.74
Elliot's Kibo device is due to have its first official trial on patient Julie Kale, but the surgery has to be postponed. Guy insists the operation goes ahead, causing Jonny to confront him about the damage he is doing. Julie's operation goes well, but she later dies after her husband, who suffers from memory loss, changes the new battery for an old one. Mary-Claire's ex-boyfriend Tom brings in a patient to AAU and a job offer for Mary-Claire. Meanwhile, Arthur and Dom compete against each other during triage, but realise they are better together.
756	21	"Trust in Me"	Dermot Boyd	Jon Sen	3 March 2015	4.94
Guy and Ric launch an investigation into Julie's death, after Elliot says it was caused by human error. Guy suspects Jonny is at fault. Jonny is later caught fishing the new battery out of the bin and the police take him in for questioning. When a patient's boyfriend, Elijah, feels Harry is neglecting his work, he stages a protest on a window cleaner's cradle. Elijah collapses and Harry climbs onto the cradle to save him. A cable snaps causing Harry to fall to the ground, resulting in critical injuries. Elsewhere, Arthur tries to keep his break-up from Zosia, which makes Zosia feel like she is being sidelined on the ward.
757	22	"Blindside"	David Innes Edwards	Anna McPartlin	10 March 2015	4.78
Harry's mother, Elizabeth, arrives at the hospital, as Harry wakes from his coma. She demands a second opinion about his treatment, but is forced to accept Raf's help when Harry's injuries cause him to go blind. Jonny is charged with murder. Jac helps deal with the fallout, while Elliot reminds the Darwin team that their patients come first. Meanwhile, Arthur struggles to choose a specialism.
758	23	"We Have the Technology"	David Innes Edwards	Nick Fisher	17 March 2015	4.81
While Mo and Adele are visiting Jonny in prison, Jonny tries to defend his cell mate, Khalid, from an attack. Both Jonny and Khalid are stabbed and taken to Holby. Jonny's condition worsens and Mo and Jac battle to save him. Harry struggles with his disfigurement and he refuses to give his consent for further treatment. After lashing out at everyone, Fletch's daughter, Evie, helps him overcome his issues. In order to help a patient, Zosia tells them about her bi-polar disorder.
759	24	"Rock and a Hard Place"	John Howlett	Johanne McAndrew and Elliot Hope	24 March 2015	5.07
Shortly before Harry's facial re-constructive surgery, Raf is informed by his brother, Giuseppe, that their mother has died. Instead of returning to Glasgow, Raf decides to go ahead with the surgery. Ina Effanga is admitted to Darwin, giving Mo an opportunity to talk to her about her father. Elsewhere, Arthur tells Serena that he wants to specialise in emergency medicine, but when he is given the chance to prove himself, he chooses to focus on what caused his patient's injuries and is outperformed by Dom.
760	25	"The Last Time I Saw You"	John Howlett	Julia Gilbert	31 March 2015	4.50
Guy is determined to have Jonny discharged and returned to prison. Jac tries to prevent it, believing Jonny is innocent. Steve Kale returns to the hospital and Mo walks him through the day of his wife's death, causing him to remember that he swapped out the new battery in the Kibo for an old one. Colette offers Mary-Claire a job working with Michael in Chicago. When Harry learns that Raf will not be performing anymore surgery on him, he decides to go to Chicago with Mary-Claire, but later decides he needs to stay at holby to get used to his face. Elsewhere, Arthur impresses Serena and wins a place on AAU.
761	26	"Squeeze the Pips"	Griff Rowland	Nick Fisher	7 April 2015	4.86
Jonny returns to Holby after being released from prison. Despite blaming Guy for what happened, he gets straight back to work. Jonny's cellmate is admitted and he later dies in surgery, prompting Jonny to leave Holby along with Jac and their daughter. Arthur starts his first day on AAU and is pranked by Fletch and Raf. But he manages to impress them after diagnosing a patient with scurvy. Sacha welcomes Essie back to Keller, but things become awkward between them when he learns she met someone in Germany after they lost contact.
762	27	"Go the Distance"	Griff Rowland	Alex Child and Andy Bayliss	14 April 2015	4.70
With Jac on deferred maternity leave, Guy is under pressure from Darwin and the new supercentre. He later steps down as CEO and secures funding for a centre of Neurosurgery. Harry returns for his after-care treatment and Mary-Claire makes it clear that she felt rejected while he was away assessing his life. Before she leaves for Chicago, Harry proposes and the couple leave together. After Dom and Zosia discover Sacha stayed out all night, they speculate over where he went, which results in a misunderstanding between Sacha and Essie.
763	28	"All About Evie"	Paul Murphy	Joe Ainsworth	21 April 2015	4.69
Guy introduces neurosurgeon Annabelle Cooper to Keller and she immediately takes Zosia under her wing, allowing her to take the lead in the theatre. Fletch's daughter, Evie, is brought in after a school bus crash. Fletch orders an MRI scan for her, fearing she has a serious head injury like her mother. But he soon learns Evie was not on the bus, having got off to avoid being bullied. Fletch also becomes concerned for another pupil, Rosa, who exhibits signs of an eating disorder. Elsewhere, Adele finds Mo's father through his medical records.
764	29	"Small Disappointments"	Paul Murphy	Patrick Homes	28 April 2015	4.60
The staff on AAU expect Serena to be promoted to CEO, but when Angus Farrell is given too much morphine for a dislocated shoulder, he admits that the board have rejected her. Serena later discovers that Guy has been trying to hire a CEO that will help him and the neuro centre, so she gets her revenge by meeting with Henrik Hanssen. Mo contacts her birth father, Clifford, and invites him to the hospital under the pretext of conducting some medical research. When Clifford finds out the truth from Adele, he walks out. After working together on a tough neuro case, Zosia later finds Annabelle looking at a brain scan identical to the patient's. Unbeknownst to her, it belongs to Annabelle.
765	30	"Homecoming"	Dermot Boyd	Dana Fainaru	5 May 2015	4.62
A May Day march brings in many casualties, putting strain on all the wards. Oliver Valentine makes his full-time return to Holby, as the new registrar on Darwin. His first patient, Rosie, tests his patience, forcing Jesse to tell Oliver to sort himself out. Henrik Hanssen also returns to Holby as CEO and immediately clashes with Guy, who learns that the funding for his neuro centre has been withdrawn. Zosia discovers Annabelle has a brain tumour. Meanwhile, Fletch asks Kathleen "Dixie" Dixon to place a bet for him when he suffers financial strain.
766	31	"Lifelines"	Dermot Boyd	Fiona Peek	12 May 2015	4.63
Zosia learns Annabelle has been researching an experimental procedure and asks for Guy's permission to carry out human trials. But Guy is forced to halt Zosia's plans due to a lack of funding. Annabelle's condition start to put her patients at risk, and Zosia offers to help with her research. Raf tries to impress Hanssen in a bid to secure funding for his maxillofacial facility, but a patient's dog causes problems. Meanwhile, Adele tries to apologise to Mo and invites Clifford to watch her in surgery. Her plan works when Mo and Clifford bond.
767	32	"The Ides of March"	Jermain Julien	Peter Mattessi	19 May 2015	4.58
Annebelle collapses as her brain tumour worsens. Zosia is determined to perform the surgery she needs, but Guy stops her, fearing that the pressure might affect Zosia's bi-polar. Annabelle defends Zosia and Guy allows her to perform the surgery. She later tells him that she is transferring to Darwin. On AAU, Raf notices that his patient's daughter, Lucy, has had facial surgery and appears to have an infection. He tries to get her to talk to him and shows her photos of Harry's facial reconstruction, which lands him in trouble with Serena. Lucy eventually allows Raf to examine her face. Elsewhere, Mo gets Clifford a job as a porter, but struggles to tell him that she is leaving for Chicago for six weeks.
768	33	"All Coming Back to Me Now"	Jermain Julien	Kate Verghese and Sally Tatchell	26 May 2015	3.01
Oliver struggles with his return to the theatre where his wife died and makes a mistake in surgery, resulting in his patient needing another operation. Elliot tells Oliver that he expects more from him, while Hanssen offers him some good advice. Sacha invites Essie to meet his children and she confides in Dom that she is not ready. But after bonding with a patient's teenage daughter, Essie changes her mind. Elsewhere, Raf manages to convince Lucy to let him operate on her face and learns that her injury is the result of domestic violence.
769	34	"Tug of Love"	Jamie Annett	Patrea Smallacombe	2 June 2015	4.49
Adele faints on the ward and suspects she is pregnant. The pregnancy test comes back positive, but Mr T informs Adele that she actually has an ovarian cyst. Jesse is distracted when Guy offers him a three month job opportunity in the United States, but he ultimately commits to Adele as she waits to learn whether the cyst is cancerous or not. Fletch tries to give Evie a good birthday despite his financial troubles. Meanwhile, Serena and Angus's romance comes to an end as they clash over a patient.
770	35	"When a Man Loves a Woman"	Jamie Annett	Nick Fisher	9 June 2015	4.26
Jesse tries to keep Adele away from his patient Talesha, leading her to suspect he has cheated on her. However, Talesha is a singer who serenades Adele as Jesse proposes. She initially turns him down, but after they talk, she accepts. A high-profile patient is admitted to Keller ahead of his live organ donation, prompting Essie to question his choice about surgery. Despite costing the hospital time and money, she wins approval from Hanssen. Fletch's car is clamped when he parks illegally to help a man with leg wounds. He tells Clifford about his debts and Clifford gives Fletch a bag of duty-free cigarettes to sell.
771	36	"The Children of Lovers"	Nigel Douglas	Lucia Haynes	16 June 2015	4.40
Zosia is late for her first shift on Darwin, annoying Oliver, who is tasked with showing her the ropes. Oliver's mood is not improved when she makes a mistake in surgery and they clash over a father and daughter who need life saving surgery. Adele admits to Jesse that she has failed her nursing degree module. New nurse Cara Martinez starts work on AAU, while Lucy returns for her surgery. However, Cara believes Lucy is not ready and asks psychiatrist Sebastian Coulter to have a talk with her, putting the surgery at risk. Elsewhere, Dom assists Guy and Mr T with a neuro procedure on a pregnant woman.
772	37	"Spiral Staircases"	Nigel Douglas	Andy Bayliss	23 June 2015	4.40
Guy persuades Jesse to help him out with a risky transoral procedure. During the surgery, Guy removes the majority of the tumour, but goes against Hanssen's advice to close up, resulting in complications. On Darwin, Zosia and Oliver are confronted with a woman who believes she has a fictional parasitic disease. With her heart condition putting her life at risk, duty psychiatrist Seb is asked to help. He antagonises Zosia, but later asks her out on a date. With his mounting debts, Fletch considers Clifford's plan to steal pharmaceutical drugs.
773	38	"Losing Control of the Wheel"	Louise Hooper	Julia Gilbert	30 June 2015	4.11
New F1 Morven Shreve starts her first day on AAU and Arthur is assigned to be her mentor by Serena. When his patient dies in surgery, Arthur struggles to cope and has a panic attack. Meanwhile, Fletch and his family are faced with eviction. Mo returns from Chicago, creating tension between Mr T and Clifford, who believes he is not the man for his daughter. Dom is surprised when his mother, Carole, turns up out of the blue. Dom desperately tries to get rid of her, while she befriends his colleagues and patients.
774	39	"Beneath a Mask"	Louise Hooper	Johanne McAndrew and Elliot Hope	7 July 2015	4.33
After losing his home, Fletch and his children are forced to sleep in the hospital basement. Realising that he has reached breaking point, Fletch agrees to help Clifford with his plan to steal pharmaceutical drugs. Following another panic attack, Arthur takes medication from the drugs trolley. On Darwin, Elliot worries about Oliver and lack of love for life. Though he dismisses Elliot's concerns, Zosia is not as easy. Oliver and Mr T have a stand off over a patient who needs surgery for both a heart condition and fibroids. Elsewhere, Dom tries to get rid of Carole, but soon learns that she has secured a job at the hospital.
775	40	"U-Turn"	Jennie Darnell	Rebecca Wojciechowski	14 July 2015	4.44
Fletch starts to have doubts about the pharmaceutical drugs heist and tries to pull out, until Clifford confesses that he is in debt to drug dealers, who know about Fletch and his children. Sacha's demanding family causes problems for Essie and results in her being unprepared for the Transplant Coordinator job. She later wins the job following a passionate speech in which she asks Hanssen to reconsider. Jesse and Adele clash when a patient asks for Jesse's help with a petition and Adele forges his signature.
776	41	"Family Fortunes"	Jennie Darnell	Joe Ainsworth	21 July 2015	4.38
When Clifford is unable to deliver the pharmaceutical drugs, the dealers threaten to harm Mo. However, they mistakenly attack Adele outside the hospital. Hanssen and Serena operate, but they admit that Adele's condition is touch-and-go. With his anxiety acting up, Arthur struggles to contain his temper with Morven and his patient. To help himself calm down, he self-medicates again. Meanwhile, Essie is affected by a terminally ill woman who is on the look out for a mother for her three children. She later tells Sacha that she wants a baby.
777	42	"Return to Innocence"	Jan Bauer	Johanne McAndrew and Elliot Hope	28 July 2015	4.41
In an effort to cope with what happened to Adele, Mo tries to keep herself busy with work. When Adele's condition worsens, both Guy and Mo have to step in to save her. Fletch urges Clifford to go to the police to keep his children safe, but Clifford comes up with a solution and leaves Holby. Fletch is also suspicious of marks on a patient called Stephen Holting who suffers with ASD. An old friend of Serena's is admitted to AAU and proves to be a little too much for Arthur to handle. Morven encourages Arthur to lighten up and find his humorous side, resulting in a diagnosis.
778	43	"A Good Man"	Jan Bauer	Patrick Homes	4 August 2015	4.31
Fletch tells Mo the truth about Clifford and the motive behind Adele's attack. Mo decides not to call the police on Fletch, knowing that his children will be orphaned, but tells him to leave Holby in a month. Raf offers Fletch help after he explains that he is bankrupt and cannot provide for his family. Adele wakes up, but Jesse worries about their future when a patient reminds him about his past relationships. Oliver tries to find out the status of Zosia's relationship with Seb, but they clash when he orders a psych evaluation for a patient.
779	44	"Speak True"	David Tucker	Katie Douglas	11 August 2015	4.45
Elliot's old friend Brigitte brings two patients from Pakistan with multi-drug resistant TB to the hospital. Elliot agrees to operate, but when Oliver's patient's condition deteriorates, he is given priority over Ayesha and Zayn. Brigitte then pretends to have called Mo to help, putting lives at risk. Elliot questions her ethics and Hanssen tells her that she is not welcome back at Holby. Sacha and Essie discuss having a baby, and Essie makes it clear that they both have to be on board with the plan. Elsewhere, Serena forces Morven to stand on her own two feet when she realises that Morven has become dependent on Arthur.
780	45	"Beautiful"	David Tucker	Julia Gilbert	18 August 2015	4.35
Dom is tasked with leading a tour of A level students around the hospital. He tries to use the opportunity to impress Hanssen and earn his respect. When one girl, Sadie, collapses, Dom diagnoses her with carotid artery disease. He later misses Sadie's surgery when he notices one of her bullies on the hospital roof. Lucy Mottica returns to AAU when her bone graft wound becomes infected. Cara questions Lucy's intentions towards Raf, and Lucy makes a formal complaint against her. Cara later witnesses Lucy deliberately making her wound worse. On Darwin, Elliot and Brigitte work together to save Zayn from a new crisis. While Hanssen offers Elliot a new role as Director of Research at Holby.
781	46	"Infallible"	Jermain Julien	Kate Verghese	25 August 2015	4.21
Milly, an old friend of Guy's late wife, is admitted to AAU with a broken wrist. Guy discovers she has three Metastatic tumors in her brain and convinces her to let him operate. Jesse questions his motives, and after Milly dies, he and Guy fight. Sacha comes into conflict with pregnant drug addict Casey. He discovers that she has an aneurysm, and needs surgery which could put the baby's life at risk. The aneurysm later ruptures, leaving Sacha no choice but to operate. He later tells Essie that they should try for a baby. Meanwhile, Oliver and Zosia spend the day flirting, which worries Seb.
782	47	"Man of Conscience"	Jermain Julien	Tony Higgins	1 September 2015	4.81
Clifford is brought into AAU following a car accident, along with Danny Jarvis, the drug dealer who attacked Adele. Clifford is soon rushed into theatre when Fletch realises that he has swallowed several packages of drugs. Clifford survives and makes up with Mo, while Danny dies from his injuries. Oliver and Zosia treat a young transgender boy with a heart murmur, who has been taking testosterone. Oliver and Seb fight when they disagree about the patient's wishes to have gender reassignment surgery without his father knowing. Guy and Jesse's friendship continues to suffer in the wake of their fight.
783	48	"An Eye for an Eye"	Nigel Douglas	Nick Fisher	8 September 2015	4.37
Ron, the grieving husband of Milly, returns to the hospital with a box of photos to show Guy, and Fletch convinces him to come down to AAU. Ron forces Guy to hold a live grenade that he has just pulled the pin out of. The hospital is evacuated, but Fletch returns to talk Ron down. After Ron is shot by the police, Fletch throws the grenade outside, where it explodes. On Darwin, Elliot, Oliver and Zosia are forced to continue surgery on a patient during the evacuation. When Zosia discovers Guy is a hostage, she runs into AAU followed closely by Oliver. After the explosion, they share their first kiss. Elsewhere, Hanssen forces Dom to treat a pessimistic patient, who is in the middle of a malpractice suit against his previous doctor.
784	49	"Shockwaves"	Nigel Douglas	Dana Fainaru	15 September 2015	4.27
Arthur struggles to control his anxiety and Morven catches him taking hospital medication. She tries to cover for him, but when Arthur makes a mistake, he blames her. Serena then sends Morven home, leading her to question her place at the hospital. Arthur confesses to stealing medication and, after Dom defends him to Hanssen, he is suspended for two weeks. Zosia tells Seb about her kiss with Oliver, leading to a confrontation between the two men. Seb admits to Zosia that he loves her, but she tells him that she does not feel the same way. Fran Reynolds, an old friend of Essie's, begins working on Keller. Sacha becomes insecure about his relationship when Fran tells him about Essie's wild past.
785	50	"At First I Was Afraid"	Julie Edwards	Julia Gilbert	22 September 2015	4.31
Elliot is ready to accept his new role as Director of Research, until Brigitte makes a sudden return to Holby with Frieda Petrenko, who is suffering from multi-drug resistant TB. Elliot is determined to save her, but after she loses consciousness, she is rushed into theatre. Elliot, Oliver and Zosia struggle to save her, until Jac returns to help out. Brigitte and Elliot have a heart to heart about their past, while Jac points out that Elliot appears to be in love with Brigitte. Elliot decides to leave Holby and go to Pakistan with Brigitte. Dom takes Arthur to the family caravan, and is soon faced with his mother and homophobic father. Dom and Arthur's friendship is soon tested as Dom deals with his father's behaviour towards him.
786	51	"Cover Story"	Daikin Marsh	Joe Ainsworth	29 September 2015	4.61
Cara's husband, Jed, turns up on AAU with a pregnant woman. When he refuses to tell her anything Cara becomes suspicious. When the husband of the patient, Sean Brady, arrives things get tense and Jed leaves with Sean and his wife, but not before the she reveals, to Cara, that the baby is Jed's! Adele comes back to work for the first time since her accident, and gets emotionally involved with a patient who she was friends with during her travel rep days. Also Jesse annoys Sacha and Dom when he say he doesn't want a work stag do.
787	52	"Ever After"	Daikin Marsh	Johanne McAndrew and Elliot Hope	6 October 2015	4.47
Adele and Jesse both end up at Holby City Hospital on the day of their wedding for separate reasons. Jed returns to AAU injured. Raf, Morven and Cara operate on him. After surgery Sean Brady returns and forces Jed to leave. Cara is determined that their marriage is over, but Jed just won't listen.

== Cast ==
=== Main characters ===
- Chizzy Akudolu as Mo Effanga
- David Ames as Dominic Copeland
- James Anderson as Oliver Valentine (episode 11, from episode 30)
- Camilla Arfwedson as Zosia March
- Bob Barrett as Sacha Levy
- Paul Bradley as Elliot Hope (until episode 50)
- Louise Delamere as Colette Sheward (until episode 4)
- Eleanor Fanyinka as Morven Shreve (from episode 38)
- Don Gilet as Jesse Law (from episode 3)
- Guy Henry as Henrik Hanssen (from episode 29)
- Jules Knight as Harry Tressler (until episode 27)
- Petra Letang as Adele Effanga
- Rosie Marcel as Jac Naylor (until episode 27, episodes 37 and 50)
- Joe McFadden as Raf di Lucca
- Niamh McGrady as Mary-Claire Carter (until episode 27)
- John Michie as Guy Self
- Rob Ostlere as Arthur Digby
- Hugh Quarshie as Ric Griffin (episodes 11−32)
- Catherine Russell as Serena Campbell
- Michael Thomson as Jonny Maconie (until episode 27, episode 37)
- Alex Walkinshaw as Adrian "Fletch" Fletcher
- Niamh Walsh as Cara Martinez (from episode 36)
- Kaye Wragg as Essie Harrison (from episode 26)

=== Recurring characters ===
- Macey Chipping as Evie Fletcher (from episode 15)
- Geff Francis as Clifford George (episodes 29−47)
- Hadley Fraser as Sebastian Coulter (episodes 36−49)
- Ben Hull as Derwood "Mr T" Thompson
- Wendy Kweh as Amy Teo (until episode 10)
- Lisa Marged as Lucy Mottica (episodes 32−45)
- Alan Morrissey as Kyle Greenham (until episode 12)
- Carli Norris as Fran Reynolds (from episode 49)
- Sandra Voe as Adrienne McKinnie (until episode 6)
- Angela Wynter as Ina Effanga (episodes 13−52)

=== Guest characters ===
- Imogen Byron as Rachel Levy (episodes 14−19)
- Debbie Chazen as Fleur Fanshawe (episodes 1−11)
- McKell David as Lloyd Kramer (episodes 14−19)
- Sally Dexter as Brigitte Nye (episodes 44−50)
- Hari Dhillon as Michael Spence (episodes 1−6)
- Olga Fedori as Frieda Petrenko (episode 50)
- Calum Finlay as Aiden Kerrigan (episodes 14−19)
- Jamie Glover as Angus Farrell (episodes 8, 29 and 34)
- Jane Hazlegrove as Kathleen "Dixie" Dixon (episode 30)
- Jody Latham as Jed Martinez (from episode 51)
- Amy McCallum as Elinor Campbell (episode 3)
- Amanda Mealing as Connie Beauchamp (episode 4)
- Georgia Tennant as Briony Whitman (episode 4)
- Nina Toussaint-White as Sophia Verlaine (episodes 5−11)
- Nina Wadia as Annabelle Cooper (episodes 28−32)
