= Amy Teo =

- Holby City character
- Wendy Kweh as Amy Teo
- First appearance: "Green Ink"; 25 March 2014
- Last appearance: "Star of Wonder"; 16 December 2014
- Portrayed by: Wendy Kweh

In-universe information
- Occupation: Consultant pharmacist
- Spouse: Raf di Lucca
- Relatives: Callum Teo (son)

Amy Teo is a fictional character from the BBC medical drama Holby City, played by actress Wendy Kweh. She first appeared in the series fifteen episode "Green Ink", broadcast on 25 March 2014. Amy arrives at Holby City hospital to work as a Consultant pharmacist in the AAU department. She is also married to fellow character specialist registrar Raf di Lucca (Joe McFadden).

When not treating medical conditions Amy's stories have revolved around her marriage to Raf and their quest to have a child. The character undergoes IVF treatment in their attempts to conceive. Their relationship is marred with mistaken pregnancies and Raf being diagnosed with a condition affecting sperm quality. Writers developed a "love triangle" storyline and introduced doctor Harry Tressler (Jules Knight) for an affair. Amy becomes pregnant by Harry causing the eventual break-down of her marriage to Raf. He attempts to adjust to the idea of bringing up Harry's child. Amy gives birth to a son and they decide to move on with their lives. Amy made her final appearance during "Star of Wonder", broadcast on 16 December 2014. The character's infidelity story proved favourable with television critics for its entertainment value.

== Casting ==
On the 23 November 2013, producer Simon Harper announced that Wendy Kweh had been cast as Amy Teo. He revealed that she was being introduced as the wife of fellow new character specialist registrar Raf di Lucca (Joe McFadden). He added that the character would take the role of a consultant pharmacist working in the hospitals AAU department and "be at the centre of a very explosive storyline". To accommodate the introduction of the character changes were made to the set. Set designer Nicole Northridge hired the company Cardinal to fit real pharmacy equipment and a dispensary on the set, which Amy would use in her profession as a pharmacist.

== Development ==
=== Characterisation ===
Sensitive, loyal and kind, beneath the sweet exterior there’s much more to pharmacist Amy than meets the eye. Exuding confidence and warmth, Amy has a mischievous streak, a surprisingly bawdy sense of humour and always has a twinkle in her eye. Intelligent, hard-working and an effortless high-flyer, she excels in everything she turns her hand to, and has the same high expectations of people that she has for herself.

— BBC Online.

Amy is described as a confident and loyal character and knows what she wants in life. Her main aim is to create a family unit as she and her husband Raf struggled to naturally conceive a child together. In an interview published by the BBC, Kweh said that Amy is an "extremely qualified" Consultant Pharmacist who has chosen to stay grounded and work alongside trauma united with doctors and consultants. Her aim is to offer these units "the best possible care in terms of drugs and treatment". Amy's strengths include her penchant for engaging with patients on both a medical and personal level to best address their needs. Kweh believed that her character was a "key member of the team" at Holby City hospital. She added that Amy "is perceptive, intuitive and particularly skilled at staying on top of everyone’s needs." She can be bossy and takes a passionate approach to her career. Kweh enjoyed portraying these traits especially the opportunity to give orders to the male staff. But she added that while Amy has a strong personality her life does not run smoothly, which added an interesting side to the character.

=== Marriage to Raf di Lucca ===
"It's such a hurdle for Raf to get over, the possibility of bringing up someone else's child - it's a lot to ask of anyone. It's a question of whether or not Raf can put his past in the past. Every time he thinks he's got over Amy's infidelity and that everything is going to be OK, his old rivalry with Harry keeps rearing its ugly head."

— McFadden on his character overcoming Amy's infidelity.

Amy and Raf's marriage is described as intense. Kweh explained that "they are both achievers and treat each other as equals in the relationship. It’s what they like about each other." But this can be problematic because one of them may be succeeding more and they become competitors sometimes. They find each other's competitive nature attractive but sometimes the opposite. Their main aim in their personal life is to have children. They had been committed to their work and left trying to start a family until they became older. Amy undergoes IVF to try to conceive their child but it is later revealed that Raf's sperm quality is causing the problem. Amy takes on her final round of IVF treatment. She convinces herself that she is pregnant and books an appointment with a consultant. He tells Amy she is not pregnant and the treatment has failed again. Instead of helping Amy through the ordeal, her husband lacks emotional support and chose to prioritise patient care over Amy's well-being. Writers used this predicament to cause a noticeable divide in their marriage.

When Harry Tressler (Jules Knight) is introduced to Amy he feels an instant attraction. Harry notices that Amy and Raf are troubled about their unsuccessful attempts at IVF. Harry is keen to use their relationship problems to his advantage. Raf cancels a date with Amy to an upmarket medical dinner. Harry decides to offer to take Amy instead. As an Inside Soap reporter noted, Amy was in a vulnerable position and Harry deployed "his considerable charm" on Amy, in his attempt to steal her from Raf. When Amy is feeling hormonal about her IVF treatment she kisses Harry because she craves a "sense of connection". Kweh believed that Harry's there to be a connection between the two. She defended the infidelity explaining that "guys like Harry will always arouse some suspicion, but that doesn't mean their connection isn't real. Even cheeky boys have real relationships and sometimes the most awkward set-ups can lead to the most real connections." For Harry the opportunity to snare Amy from Raf was a way to get revenge. Knight told Katy Moon (Inside Soap) that his character was unhappy that the more qualified Raf had more power in the work place. Harry does have moments "where his moral compass is spinning", but then lust takes over with their kiss and they have sex. The actor concluded that their affair would "wreak havoc" for Amy and Raf, which was Harry's original intention aside from his newfound feelings of lust towards Amy.

Kweh told a reporter from What's on TV that Amy avoids Harry because she feels guilty. Amy made a "terrible error of judgement" when she was at her most vulnerable. She tries her best to "play happy families" with Raf but then starts to feel dizzy, which prompts her to take a pregnancy test informing her that she is pregnant. The surprise storyline twist leaves Amy with a dilemma, she is finally pregnant but faces the prospect of ruining her marriage to Raf. Kweh stated that her first concern had now become Raf rather than having a child. Amy tells Raf about her pregnancy despite the chance it could be Harry's baby. She thinks about "miracle stories" about people having IVF and Amy hopes that Raf is the father. Kweh described Amy as "fearing the worst.... but hoping for the best." Harry uses the opportunity to blackmail Amy into convincing Raf to help him advance in his career. Amy thought Harry was a true friend and feels stupid for believing his "nice bloke act".

Harry makes an error with a patient's medication and Amy takes the blame. Raf notices the pair having secret discussions and becomes suspicious. When he suspects that one of them is lying about the medication error he confronts Amy. She takes him by surprise changing the subject and confessing to sleeping with Harry. McFadden told a What's on TV reporter that his character only wanted the truth about the medication, but Amy's confession is "100 times worse". He feels "utterly betrayed" and never in "a million years" would have believed Amy would sleep with anyone else. He also noted that Harry is the worst person Amy could have been unfaithful with. But the drama escalates when Raf realises Harry could be the father of Amy's baby and "it rocks his world." He remains angry and feels foolish to have underestimated Amy's loyalty. McFadden stated that it was during these scenes he begins to wonder if Amy planned to sleep with Harry. He questions whether Amy "consciously tried to get pregnant" following months of failed fertility treatment.

Raf pretends that the results of a paternity test indicate he is the father. But no test was taken and McFadden said that Raf lies to try to get Harry to back off from Amy. In July 2014, Knight and McFadden still did not know which of their characters was actually the father of the baby. On-screen the baby's biological father was kept secret until December 2014. Her actions have more serious consequences for Raf. He struggles to get over Amy's infidelity and begins to sabotage Harry's career, he even considers killing his rival. McFadden said that Raf cannot stand to see Harry succeeding in his career after he slept with his wife. He later explained that it was Amy who had gained viewer sympathy and understanding during the storyline. He had met a female viewer who condoned Amy's affair because of their own need to have biological children. But Male viewers had told the actor that Raf needs to forget about Amy and move on with his life. But McFadden's sympathy also lay with Amy, he said "she did what she had to do" to have the baby she always wanted.

=== Conclusion to storylines ===
As Amy nears the end of her pregnancy she asks Raf to be her birthing partner. Kweh told another What's on TV interviewer that her character is scared and considers her birthing plan. Amy is upset when Raf refuses and asks for a divorce. The actress assessed that Amy is "flummoxed" and caught "off guard", she genuinely believed that she and Raf were making progress to repair their relationship. Writers continued to involve Harry in Amy's baby storyline. Amy begins to feel unwell and Harry rushes to her aid. His caring nature confuses Amy who is vulnerable. Kweh believed that Harry confuses most people when they are vulnerable and he is "at his best and very worst".

Her condition is checked over by Derwood Thompson (Ben Hull) who informs her that she is in premature labour. Amy's emotional state is worsened and "fears she'll never be totally ready for motherhood." Kweh noted that "Fortunately, she can cover some of her vulnerability; she's had to so many times this year already." As the birth is complicated she is forced to have a Caesarean operation and Raf alongside Harry are present for the birth. Despite being there for Amy, she hears him state that he cannot forgive himself for his role in ruining their marriage. This gives Amy false hope. The actress concluded that Amy momentarily feels "hope and sadness". She feels sad because it took the birth of her child to make Raf realise that he does still care for Amy. Amy made her final appearance in the show during the episode titled "Star of Wonder", which was broadcast on 16 December 2014.

== Reception ==
A reporter from the Sunday Mirror likened the love triangle storyline to a boxing match. They quipped "and in the blue corner, it's Harry, in the red, it's Raf. In the middle, looking a little stressed, Amy." A South Wales Echo writer branded it the "Amy/Harry/Raf triangle of shame." A South Wales Echo journalist quipped "the diagnosis for Raf and Amy's marriage is still pretty bleak after her affair". A Daily Record reporter included an episode centric to Amy's baby story in their "Pick of the day" feature.
