= Raf di Lucca =

- Holby City character
- Joe McFadden as Raf di Lucca
- First appearance: "Prince Among Men"; 28 January 2014
- Last appearance: Episode 1030; 21 July 2020
- Portrayed by: Joe McFadden

In-universe information
- Occupation: Registrar General Surgeon; Fellow
- Spouses: Amy Teo (divorced); Essie Harrison (2017)
- Significant other: Cara Martinez
- Relatives: Enzo di Lucca (father); Giuseppe di Lucca (brother)
- Religion: Catholic

Raffaello "Raf" di Lucca is a fictional character from the BBC medical drama Holby City, played by actor Joe McFadden. He first appeared in the sixteenth series episode "Prince Among Men", broadcast on 28 January 2014. Raf is a Registrar General Surgeon, who joined the Acute Assessment Unit staff. He was introduced along with two other regular characters by the show's executive producer Oliver Kent in a bid to "shake things up". McFadden's casting was announced in September 2013, and he began filming the following month. He initially received a one-year contract with the show. To help him prepare for the role, McFadden watched open-heart surgery. McFadden departed in the nineteenth series episode "Group Animal, Part Two", broadcast on 7 December 2017, and returns for a single episode in the twenty-second series, broadcast on 21 July 2020.

Raf is portrayed as "highly driven", passionate, moral and "very sensitive". McFadden took inspiration for some of Raf's personality traits from his Italian brother-in-law. Raf specialises in trauma and uses cutting-edge techniques in his work. The character's introductory scenes saw him save a young patient's life with improvised equipment, leading to conflict with the hospital's CEO Guy Self (John Michie). Raf's wife, consultant pharmacist Amy Teo (Wendy Kweh), was introduced two months later and it soon became clear that their marriage was strained by their fertility issues. Amy later conceived a child with Raf's rival Harry Tressler (Jules Knight), following a one-night stand.

Raf struggled to comprehend Amy's infidelity and McFadden called the situation "tragic". Raf embarked on a revenge scheme against Harry and attempted to ruin his career by risking a patient's life. The storyline divided the audience, with some believing Harry deserved everything he got, while others thought Raf had gone too far. Following the end of his marriage to Amy, Raf became more humble and he began to lighten up. He also developed a close friendship with Adrian "Fletch" Fletcher (Alex Walkinshaw). In June 2015, nurse Cara Martinez (Niamh Walsh) was introduced to AAU, and she and Raf had a brief "will-they-won't-they" romance, which became popular with fans. Raf later begins a relationship with Essie Harrison (Kaye Wragg), which results in their marriage. Shortly after, Raf dies after being shot by Fredrik Johansson (Billy Postlethwaite).

== Casting ==
On 17 September 2013, Daniel Kilkelly of entertainment website Digital Spy announced that actor Joe McFadden had joined the main cast of Holby City as new registrar Raffaello "Raf" di Lucca. McFadden's casting was announced alongside Petra Letang, who joined the cast as healthcare assistant Adele Effanga, and David Ames, who returned to his role as Dominic Copeland. The show's executive producer Oliver Kent said Raf's introduction would help to "shake things up" and hoped viewers would warm to him, Adele and Dominic. McFadden had previously appeared as a patient in Holby City's sister show Casualty, which is set in the same fictitious hospital. Of his casting, McFadden stated "I'm absolutely thrilled to be joining the cast of such a successful show and becoming part of the staff at Holby City. I'm looking forward to scrubbing in and showing off Raf's innovative lifesaving skills!" McFadden began filming in October and was initially contracted for a year. To prepare for the role, McFadden watched open-heart surgery. He developed a respect for the surgeons he met, and gained some insight into why his character might have such a large ego. He also watched episodes of 24 Hours in A&E and Grey's Anatomy.

== Development ==
=== Characterisation and introduction ===
A dedicated, driven and passionate doctor, Raf loves nothing more than being in the medical 'zone'. An expert in resuscitation, he is a true medical pioneer and an energetic force of nature, who is led by his heart rather than his head.

— An excerpt from Raf's profile on the official Holby City website.

Raf was initially billed as being "brilliant and highly driven". Series producer Simon Harper also described Raf as "a highly-driven and passionate character", and added that he would form "a great dynamic" and rivalry with fellow AAU doctor Harry Tressler (Jules Knight). McFadden said Raf was a moral man and "single-minded" in his career. While the show's official website describes Raf as being "demanding" and "stubborn" when it comes to his career. McFadden also told Rick Fulton of the Daily Record that Raf was "very sensitive" and tries his best to reassure people. Raf is Scots Italian and McFadden took inspiration for some of Raf's personality traits from his Italian brother-in-law. Reflecting on the changes to Raf's personality since his marriage breakdown, McFadden said "Raf was a pain when he arrived at Holby. He came in full of bravado, so to have that ripped away from him is brilliant, he's learning to be humble, and he's learning that he isn't perfect." McFadden was pleased when Raf's personality began to lighten up, and he enjoyed portraying his vulnerable and gentler sides. He added that Raf cares about the hospital very much, but he did not want his character to come across as "a real dictator".

McFadden told Katy Moon of Inside Soap that Raf specialises in trauma and has acquired some cutting-edge techniques from around the world. The actor described Raf's introduction as "hard-hitting", as he implies that Ric Griffin (Hugh Quarshie) and CEO Guy Self (John Michie) would be stupid not to hire him for a registrar's position on AAU. Raf then showed off his skills by saving a young boy's life using an improvised ECMO machine that he builds out of hospital equipment. McFadden explained, "The procedure is pretty unorthodox and very risky. But Raf is prepared to put himself and the hospital on the line for the sake of his patient. It leads to conflict with Guy, though, because he doesn't want to risk Holby's reputation." During the same day, Raf managed to annoy Harry and Mo Effanga (Chizzy Akudolu), but he befriended nurse Mary-Claire Carter (Niamh McGrady). McFadden assured Moon that there would not be a romance between the characters, as Raf was married. Moon and Sarah Ellis added that Raf's plans to move AAU into the 21st century would not go over well with everyone.

=== Friendships ===
Raf befriended his colleague Serena Campbell (Catherine Russell) as he treated her mother. Russell called it "a real genuine, burgeoning friendship and warmth between Serena and Raf." She also said the characters would have some fun and share some "drunken evenings" together. Raf also developed a friendship with AAU Ward Manager Adrian "Fletch" Fletcher (Alex Walkinshaw). Fletch became "a real ally" for Raf during his marriage troubles. McFadden described Fletch as being "a guiding light", as he helped Raf through some dark times. The actor approved of the friendship and said he enjoyed working with Walkinshaw. Raf later invited Fletch and his children to move in with him. He often helped Fletch out by assisting with their care. Their friendship was tested when Fletch asked Raf to babysit while he took the hospital's new psychiatrist Naomi Palmer (Lorna Brown) out on a date. Raf was "disgruntled" and reminded Fletch that he had responsibilities at home.

=== Amy's affair and rivalry with Harry ===
Ahead of the broadcast of his first episode, McFadden revealed that Raf was married to a consultant pharmacist called Amy, who would eventually be introduced to the show. Two months later, Raf's wife Amy Teo (Wendy Kweh) began working at the hospital, as a consultant pharmacist. It soon emerged that Raf and Amy were struggling to conceive a child and their fertility issues were putting a strain on their marriage. They undergo IVF treatment, but it fails. While Raf feels that "it wasn't meant to be", Amy refuses to accept it and the couple are briefly estranged. Shortly after the failed IVF attempt, Amy announces that she is pregnant. However, Raf was unaware that Amy had had a one-night stand with Harry, meaning he might not be the baby's father. Amy later proposed that she and Raf move to Copenhagen, but Raf quickly "shoots down" the suggestion.

"Raf sees Harry as a posh boy who's had everything handed to him on a plate, unlike Raf, a working class lad, who's had to scrimp and scrape to get where he is. Also, Harry uses a lot of his energy chatting up nurses, whereas Raf's attention is always on the job."

— McFadden on Raf's dislike of Harry.

Raf became suspicious when he learnt Amy was risking her career to cover up a mistake Harry made, causing her to admit that she cheated on him with Harry. Raf did not react with anger or violence, instead he was calm about the revelation. McFadden explained, "A lot of people would lash out if they discovered their spouse had cheated on them. But Raf believes there are better ways to get revenge. Rest assured, Harry will pay for what he's done!" McFadden called the situation "tragic" for Raf, as he had been so excited when he learned Amy was pregnant, and he never expected her to have an affair. Raf felt his world was crashing down around him, and McFadden thought Raf might have underestimated how far Amy was willing to go to have a child. Raf and Harry were then forced to treat a patient who had been shot in the face with a crossbow because he was having an affair. The patient's wife attacked him when she learned the truth, which contrasted with Raf's reaction.

McFadden told Katy Moon of Inside Soap that he would have punched Harry if he was in Raf's shoes, but thought his character was clever for biding his time instead of lashing out. The actor also said that Raf and Amy had to re-establish the trust in their relationship, which would be "a lengthy process" and something McFadden was not sure Raf could do. In the wake of Amy's confession, Raf struggled to focus on his work. He later demanded that Amy take a paternity test to determine if the baby was his or Harry's. Obstetrician Derwood Thompson (Ben Hull) explained to Amy that Raf's chances of being the father were low due to his fertility issues. She then told Raf that she was going to keep the baby no matter what the results of the paternity test were.

While driving Amy to work, Raf accidentally crashes his car, resulting in a visit to Mr Thompson to check on the health of the baby. The scan revealed that Amy was expecting a son, which "only serves to highlight the growing cracks" in Raf and Amy's marriage. Raf continued to struggle with Amy's betrayal, causing problems for the couple. As part of his revenge scheme against Harry, Raf risked a patient's life in an attempt to ruin Harry's career. During confession, Raf told his priest that he had been having thoughts about killing Harry for having sex with Amy. As Raf goes "into free fall", he turned to the Church for support. McFadden commented, "His Catholic beliefs are entrenched in him, even if they have been kept in the background up till now." Back at the hospital, Raf decided to hide Harry's patient's medical notes, so when she almost dies, Harry is suspended for negligence. Raf felt "appalled" by his actions and it left him questioning whether he should still be a doctor. Knight believed the storyline worked so well as it divided the audience. Some thought Harry deserved everything he got, while others thought Raf went too far by framing Harry.

When Harry returned to Holby, he set about trying to clear his name, but struggled to convince Serena that Raf set him up. Knight explained that no one believes Harry, as he has made previous mistakes and is accusing a senior doctor of trying to kill a patient. Meanwhile, Raf was struggling with his guilt, forcing him to confess to framing Harry. Amy names Raf as her birthing partner despite their estrangement, but he responded by asking her for a divorce. Kweh said Amy was "flummoxed" by Raf's demand, but she then found herself going into early labour. Both Raf and Harry are present at the birth, and Amy later hears that Raf has been to see the baby and that he blames himself for their marital problems. Kweh added that Amy "feels hope and sadness" by the moment.

=== Relationships ===
==== Cara Martinez ====
"Cara is the kind of girl Raf needs in his life – he just doesn't have the tools to come out and say it. They're dancing around one another and she's giving him all sorts of mixed signals."

— McFadden on Raf and Cara's romantic difficulties.

In June 2015, nurse Cara Martinez (Niamh Walsh) was introduced to the AAU ward. Raf was "not impressed" when Cara got involved with his patient Lucy Mottica (Lisa Marged), who was due to undergo facial surgery. Cara expressed her concern about Lucy's reasons for having the operation, especially after she learned Lucy was a victim of domestic violence. Raf was put out when Cara then suggested Lucy should meet with a psychiatrist, as he felt he had missed the signs with his own patient. Walsh stated that Cara was able to offer the new perspective on the situation, as Raf was "too involved". She added that both Cara and Raf were "strong-minded". Lucy later made a revelation about her personal life that forced Raf to put the surgery on hold, while he and Cara worked together to help her. Cara was soon revealed to be married to undercover police officer Jed Martinez (Jody Latham). Jed came to the hospital, posing as a bodyguard to Nicole Brady (Sarah Ridgeway) and her criminal husband Sean (Oliver Walker). Cara later discovered that Jed had fathered Nicole's baby. Producer Simon Harper commented that the storyline would "test" Cara and Raf's relationship.

McFadden told Allison Jones of Inside Soap that Cara and Raf were foolish to take on Sean, as he was a hardened criminal, while Jed was "a bit of a law unto himself". Raf wanted to believe that Jed was a good man, but he and Cara soon realised that his time with Sean and the criminal underworld had changed him. McFadden also told Jones that Raf's main concern was to look after Cara and make sure she is all right. The actor enjoyed his character's involvement in Cara's situation, as Raf was normally "a stickler for rules and regulations". Walsh joked that Cara should have broken up with Jed a long time ago, so she could romance "the cute Scottish doctor!". McFadden thought Cara and Raf would make a good couple, as they were both "fun-loving" and devoted to their work. Walsh agreed, saying "They'd not be lovey-dovey of affectionate at all – they're the kind of people who'd always be keeping each other on their toes. That's definitely their dynamic – which is actually quite like Joe and me in real life, to be honest!" She also thought that there was a good chemistry between the characters, but pointed out that Cara was struggling to admit that to herself as "her head is in such a mess" about Jed. McFadden added that it was about time Raf had a romantic storyline, and he hoped that Raf had learnt his lesson about letting his work come between him and his partner.

Fletch later enters Raf into a charity date auction and Serena's friend Sian Kors (Andrée Bernard) is the winning bidder. When asked if Raf was ready for love, McFadden replied that he was "mortified". Raf initially believes that Sian is not serious about their date, but she soon turns up on AAU and he feels a bit intimidated by her, as she knows what she wants. McFadden explained that Raf decides to go out with Sian when it appears Cara is not interested in pursuing a relationship with him. McFadden assured fans that there would be a resolution to the pair's "will-they-won't they" romance, but said there were some "shocks in store" for them. The couple became popular with fans on social media, and McFadden pointed out that they had been given the portmanteau "Rara". Weeks later, Cara suddenly kissed Raf, leading him to believe that she wanted to start a relationship with him. However, the kiss only proved to Cara that she was not over her ex-husband, while Fletch was forced to point out to Raf that Cara was not ready for a new romance. An Inside Soap columnist thought the development could be the end to any potential relationship between Raf and Cara, unless the nurse changed her mind later on.

==== Essie Harrison ====
In later 2016, Raf moves over to Keller ward and has a casual relationship with transplant co-ordinator Essie Harrison (Kaye Wragg). McFadden admitted that he was surprised by the development when he read the script. Raf realises that he is not "sophisticated enough" for a friends with benefits arrangement, as he soon develops feelings for Essie. McFadden commented, "He was never supposed to do that, but Raf being Raf he's a bit of a sentimentalist and got attached to her." The actor hoped Raf and Essie's relationship would be explored more in the future, adding that with Essie's former partner Sacha Levy's (Bob Barrett) jealousy and their desire to have a family of their own, it would be "an interesting dynamic". Raf also briefly dates Kim Whitfield (Louisa Clein), a former patient, who later returns to the hospital and claims Raf is the father of her unborn twins. However, Raf later learns that Kim is lying, which led McFadden to brand Raf's love life "a bit of a disaster area". He explained that Raf liked Kim and he was willing to overlook her drug addiction and dishonesty, because he was the father of her children, but it soon turned into another "disastrous relationship" for Raf.

Weeks later, Essie flirts with Raf in order to get him to sign up for a half marathon that Dominic Copeland (David Ames) is organising. She also suggests that they start training together, which leads Raf to think that she is still interested in having a relationship with him. But Raf soon learns that Essie has been teasing him, and she is surprised when he accuses her of playing with his feelings. The actor confirmed that Raf and Essie would finally start a serious relationship and he hoped it would work out between them. He also thought it would be inevitable that they would clash at times, which he was looking forward to acting out. Of what attracts Raf to Essie, McFadden told What's on TV's Victoria Wilson, "Well, she's beautiful for a start, which always helps. And she's very good at her job. That's the sort of thing I think would really impress him. She's very capable. She's very good at handling her high-up position of being a nurse on the ward and I think that really catches his eye."

Raf later proposes to Essie, but he is unsure what her answer will be. McFadden liked playing out the "real sense of jeopardy" surrounding whether Essie would accept the proposal, which she does. McFadden thought that the couple would have a quiet wedding, as Raf has been married before and it ended very publicly. He admitted that if it was up to him, Essie and Raf would go to Italy and marry in a chateau in front of the entire cast. Raf and Essie marry in secret at a registry office. Essie's former partner Sacha is upset when he learns the news, but he knows that they are not suited. McFadden commented, "It's an interesting dynamic having Sacha in the mix and Essie being slightly torn because she obviously still has some feelings for him but doesn't want to be with him any more." When the rest of their colleagues find out, they throw the couple a party at the local bar. McFadden said that Raf and Essie did not want "a lot of fuss", as they made the commitment for themselves.

=== Departure ===
On 27 November 2017, McFadden hinted that he would be leaving Holby City in the near future. The actor, who was competing on Strictly Come Dancing at the time, said that he wanted to pursue other acting roles, including live entertainment. He explained, "I love doing theatre, I love musicals, and the longer you leave it the harder it gets. It's been four years without doing any stage work and I don't want to leave it much longer. I'm going back for a little bit but I can't say too much else. If and when it does happen it would be nice to have the big exit, as an actor no-one wants to leave in the back of a taxi even if it means being killed off. And obviously a big stunt would be brilliant!".

McFadden made his final appearance as Raf in the nineteenth series episode "Group Animal – Part Two", which was broadcast on 7 December 2017. Raf died after being shot by Henrik Hanssen's (Guy Henry) son Fredrik Johansson (Billy Postlethwaite). Raf's exit was kept out of spoilers for "maximum impact". After his exit scenes aired, McFadden revealed that he had decided to leave the show after feeling that he had played out everything he possibly could with Raf. McFadden did not want to become a background character and thought it would be good for Raf to leave while he was still popular with the viewers. The actor added that he was partly relieved that Raf was being killed off, as he would be tempted to return to the show and he wanted to go without a "safety net for a while."

=== Return ===
The character's return for a special episode was announced on 9 July 2020. Raf returns as a vision to Essie, who is struggling with her terminal cancer diagnosis and is looking for answers. McFadden expressed his delight at reprising his role, calling it "one of the happiest jobs" in his career. He explained that Raf returns to guide Essie in a "touching" episode. A show spokesperson told the Daily Mirror that the episode would be "emotional" and "incredibly moving". Raf returns in the twenty-second series, in an episode broadcast on 21 July 2020.

== Reception ==
Katy Moon and Sarah Ellis of Inside Soap said Raf's arrival would "shake-up" AAU. Of the character's introduction, Jane Simon of the Daily Mirror observed: "Since Malick's departure there's been a gap at Holby for a ridiculously over-confident registrar. So say hello to Raffaello Di Lucca – that's 'Raf', to you – played by former Heartbeat actor Joe McFadden." Simon added that Raf was "completely full of himself but in a kind of charming way (he has nice eyes)". Katy Moon of Inside Soap agreed with Simon, stating "There's never been a shortage of big egos at Holby, but when cocky registrar Raffaello 'Raf' di Luca blasts on to AAU this week, we'll realise we ain't seen anything yet!". Rick Fulton of the Daily Record dubbed Raf "Holby City's new hunky doc".

A reporter for the Liverpool Daily Post dubbed the Raf/Amy/Harry storyline a "triangle of shame." A contributor to the South Wales Echo noted "the diagnosis for Raf and Amy's marriage is still pretty bleak after her affair". While a Daily Record journalist later commented, "things were bad enough between Raf and Amy without yet another rift over their unborn baby." Laura Withers from Inside Soap noted, "Noble Raf was always going to put his duties as a doc before his personal life."

Critics have lamented Raf's lack of a romantic life. After his marriage break up, a Daily Mirror reporter stated "Life as a singleton isn't proving easy for Raf. When he tries to find romance, it leads to a catastrophe on the wards, landing him in trouble with Michael." Andrew Watt of the Bedfordshire on Sunday observed, "Cupid's arrows keep missing as Raf (Joe McFadden) and Cara (Niamh Walsh) continue to avoid admitting their feelings for each other." While an Inside Soap columnist called Cara and Raf "smitten colleagues", and opined "it's the moment that Holby City fans have been waiting for" when they kissed. Laura-Jayne Tyler from the same publication wrote, "Dishy Holby doctor Raf has been single for far too long in our eyes". Tyler also found Raf and Fletch's bromance to be "equally engaging".
