= Harry Tressler =

- Holby City character
- Jules Knight as Harry Tressler
- First appearance: "The More Deceived"; 14 May 2013
- Last appearance: "Go the Distance"; 14 April 2015
- Portrayed by: Jules Knight

In-universe information
- Occupation: Speciality Training Year 3
- Family: Billy Tressler (father); Elizabeth Tressler (mother)
- Significant others: Gemma Wilde; Mary-Claire Carter
- Children: Callum Teo

Harry Tressler is a fictional character from the BBC medical drama Holby City, played by Jules Knight. He first appeared in the fifteenth series episode "The More Deceived", broadcast on 14 May 2013. Harry was introduced as a CT1, later progressing to CT3. Knight's casting was announced in January 2013. He auditioned four times, with the producers taking two and a half months to choose him for the part. To help prepare for the role, Knight shadowed a surgeon and watched a laparotomy. In February 2015, it was announced that Knight had quit the show in order to concentrate on the release of his first solo record. Harry departed during the seventeenth series on 14 April 2015.

Harry was portrayed as arrogant, privileged, clever and a rule breaker. He is a good doctor, who looks out for his patients. Knight liked that Harry was a "love to hate" character, as he did not want him to be boring. Harry was also billed as a womaniser and a love triangle developed between him, Gemma Wilde (Ty Glaser) and Mary-Claire Carter (Niamh McGrady). Harry and Mary-Claire eventually settled into a casual relationship, before Harry realised that he loved her. Harry developed a rivalry with new registrar Raf di Lucca (Joe McFadden) and he had an affair with Raf's wife Amy Teo (Wendy Kweh). In revenge, Raf tried to sabotage Harry's career. The character's final storyline arc saw him suffer serious facial injuries in a fall. Knight said Harry was frustrated by appearance as he had always relied on his good looks.

== Casting ==
On 19 January 2013, it was announced that singer and actor Jules Knight had joined the cast as new doctor Harry Tressler. Knight attended four auditions, with the producers taking two and a half months to cast him in the role. Knight initially believed that he had not been successful, until the producers contacted him in early January. He admitted that he had to turn down previous roles due to his touring commitments with Blake, but after quitting the group he was free to return to acting. He commented, "this regular part in Holby City came up and it seemed perfect for me. To prepare for the role, Knight shadowed a surgeon and watched a laparotomy. He said the experience gave him an idea of what it was like to a doctor and work in a hospital. He also said that he was not sure how he would react to all the blood, but found it be "fascinating". Knight admitted that he was nervous ahead of shooting his first scenes and was aware that he need to show confidence, as his character was a competent doctor who knew what he was doing.

== Development ==
=== Characterisation ===
Arrogant, privileged and acerbically witty, first impressions of Harry can be misleading, but dig a little deeper and there is a warmth and affection that may not initially be obvious.

— An excerpt from Harry's profile on the official Holby City website.

Ahead of his first appearance, the show's series producer Justin Young described Harry: "At first glance, Harry Tressler seems like a charming, arrogant public schoolboy that we'll love to hate, but there's much more to him. His arrival on the wards is going to really shake things up." Knight said Harry was a good doctor, but he had a manipulative nature. The actor hoped Harry would not be a "bland" character. He also told Melanie Hancill from The People that Harry was clever and good with people. He continued, "He has his own set of beliefs and he is more concerned about them than any other rules. He is good with patients because he is slightly anti-establishment." When asked if he was similar to Harry, Knight replied that he did not like too many rules and was often naughty when he was younger. Harry did not make a good first impression on his boss Ric Griffin (Hugh Quarshie), as he liked to mess around.

During an interview with Lorraine Kelly, Knight branded Harry "a bit of a player" and a "renegade", who would break rules. Knight was pleased when Harry later developed "an edge", and loved it when he became "a bad boy". He explained that the producers had originally told him that Harry would be a bit edgy, but they kept giving him storylines that showed off Harry's kind side, like breaking the rules to help his patients. Harry's father Billy Tressler (Murray Head) was introduced in February 2014. It was clear that Harry did not get along with his father. When Billy started to charm Serena Campbell (Catherine Russell), Harry became concerned, especially when he later offered to fund her general surgery project. Knight said the relationship between them was "interesting".

=== Relationships ===
==== Gemma Wilde ====
After arriving on the AAU ward, Harry "wastes no time" in flirting with fellow doctor Gemma Wilde (Ty Glaser) and nurse Mary-Claire Carter (Niamh McGrady). Harry had a brief relationship with Gemma. She initially mistook him for a psychiatric consultant, but he later impressed her when he solved a case of a patient who thought she was a vampire. Knight confirmed that Harry was "a ladies man" and described Gemma and Harry's relationship as "love-hate" with a lot of game playing. Despite going out for a drink together, Harry ended up going home with Mary-Claire. Gemma and Harry later shared a kiss, but Glaser believed that Gemma would not enter into a relationship with him, as she had her career and her son to think about. She branded Harry "a bit of a player" and said "her recent kiss with Harry was a silly thing to do in hindsight – and she's put out that he doesn't seem interested in her." When Gemma's career was placed in jeopardy by Oliver Valentine (James Anderson), Harry tried to defend her. Gemma did not appreciate him trying to take control of the situation, as he was not fully aware of what happened with the patient.

Harry and Gemma later competed against each other to win a spot in Ric's unique surgery session. They also fell out when a former friend of Harry's, Gareth "Gaz" Mason (Jay Taylor), was admitted to AAU following an all-night drinking session. Harry instantly recognised Gaz, but instead of telling Gemma that they were friends, Harry made himself scarce. When Gemma told him that Gaz had denied being a heavy drinker and wanted to be discharged, Harry came clean and admitted that he knew Gaz had a drinking problem. To make things up to Gemma, Harry gave her the spot in Ric's surgery session and arranged to look after her son, Finn (Finley Barrett). However, Finn soon fell ill and it appeared that he had taken an ecstasy tablet from Gaz's bag. Gemma blamed Harry for Finn's condition, but it soon emerged that Finn had the Norovirus. Ric later suspended Gemma for bringing her son onto the ward.

==== Mary-Claire Carter ====
The character Harry had a one-night stand with Mary-Claire. McGrady said Mary-Claire was "very keen" on Harry and wanted more than a casual relationship with him. The actress thought Harry and Mary-Claire were quite similar to each other, saying "They both love to party, they are charming and like to have their own way." After Harry kissed Gemma, the characters became involved in a love triangle. McGrady admitted that Mary-Claire was initially oblivious to the spark between Gemma and Harry, but she thought Mary-Claire would be angry if she found out about the kiss. Harry and Mary-Claire later went out on a date, which left Mary-Claire believing it was the start of a new relationship. However, shortly afterwards she overheard Harry saying she was not the type of girl he would introduce to his mother. Mary-Claire later declined another date with Harry to watch films with a patient.

When Mary-Claire returned to Holby after an extended break, she and Harry embarked on a friends with benefits relationship. Knight explained to a What's on TV reporter that Harry and Mary-Claire had developed "a solid friendship" through their time together. McGrady said Mary-Claire had always had a weakness for Harry, and if he was to offer her commitment she would definitely take it. When asked if the couple would find happiness, the actress stated "There's definitely potential there. I think they would both have to be really honest about their feelings, and that would mean Mary-Claire putting her heart on the line. Harry would really have to want to settle down, too." Harry eventually realised that he had fallen in love with Mary-Claire. But when he finally worked up the courage to tell her, she did not take his declaration seriously.

=== Affair with Amy and rivalry with Raf ===
When pharmacist Amy Teo (Wendy Kweh) joined AAU, Harry immediately started flirting with her as they helped a patient who had been using home-grown medicines. Harry soon learned that Amy was registrar Raf di Lucca's (Joe McFadden) wife, but it did not stop him from trying to charm her. A rivalry developed between Harry and Raf, and McFadden explained "Raf sees Harry as a posh boy who's had everything handed to him on a plate, unlike Raf, a working class lad, who's had to scrimp and scrape to get where he is. Also, Harry uses a lot of his energy chatting up nurses, whereas Raf's attention is always on the job." Harry soon learned that Amy and Raf's marriage was under strain as they going through IVF to conceive a child. When Raf cancelled a date with Amy ahead of a black-tie event, Harry stepped in to take his place and tried to charm Amy.

When Raf admitted to Amy that he was not ready to have children, Harry used their subsequent argument to his advantage. Knight explained "Raf has all the power, and Harry sees this as an opportunity to turn the tables and get revenge." After Amy became drunk, she offered herself to Harry and they had a one-night stand. Knight admitted that Harry did have a moment of hesitation, but he "gives in to lust". Harry realised that their affair could cause havoc and Harry definitely wanted havoc for Raf. Knight said that the storyline would run for some time, and that reception from viewers had been pretty positive, as they seemed to "love baddies". Harry tried to use the affair with Amy to further his career, causing her to feel "stupid" for thinking he was a friend. Kweh commented, "Amy quickly realises that, in spite of his posh education, Harry's not going to be a gentleman about things."

When Amy learned Harry was being put forward for a fellowship in the United States, she realised there was a chance to get rid of him and save her marriage. Amy encouraged Raf to give Harry a good reference, but he refused to help Harry's career by lying. Amy later learned that she was pregnant, but had doubts as to who the biological was. After Raf learned the truth about Amy and Harry's affair, he attempted to ruin Harry's career. Raf hid medical notes for Harry's patient and when she almost died, Harry was suspended for negligence. Upon his return to work, Harry struggled to convince Serena that Raf had set him up. Knight stated, "Harry's made mistakes before and is a junior doctor compared to Raf, so people will always take his word over Harry's." He told Laura-Jayne Tyler from Inside Soap that the storyline had divided audiences and would get even more complicated.

=== Accident ===
In March 2015, Harry suffered serious injuries following a fall from a suspended window-cleaner's cradle. While treating a patient with sickle cell anaemia, Harry became distracted by his problems with Mary-Claire. The patient's boyfriend Elijah (Shia Miller) climbed onto the cradle to protest about the way he was treated by Harry. When Elijah collapsed, Harry climbed out onto the cradle to help him. Knight said Harry was not out to impress Mary-Claire with the move and explained "Harry's terrified of heights, so this is one example of how, recently, he's become a more selfless person. All he's thinking about in that moment is genuinely being a good doctor and saving Elijah, so Harry quite selflessly and spontaneously gets into the cleaning cradle in order to help this guy...and things go wrong from there."

One of the cables holding the cradle up suddenly snapped, causing it to come away from the building. Harry was left clinging to the side of cradle. Knight performed much of the stunt himself, despite being scared of heights. Harry fell to the ground and Knight called it "horrific". Raf was the first to reach Harry, who was unresponsive and had a faint pulse. Harry was rushed into theatre, where complications caused him to flatline. Harry's face was left scarred by the accident. Knight explained that it frustrated Harry, as he has always relied on his good looks and he now felt like a monster. He continued, "It's a total nightmare for him." When Raf announced his plans to rebuild Harry's broken facial bones with cutting-edge technology, a "downbeat" Harry refused to sign off on a crucial scan. However, Adrian Fletcher's (Alex Walkinshaw) daughter Evie (Macey Chipping) encouraged him to face his fears.

=== Departure ===
In February 2015, Mark Jefferies from the Daily Mirror reported Knight had quit Holby City to concentrate on the release of his first solo album. Of his departure, Knight commented "I loved playing Harry on Holby and have had fun there with the cast. Variety is the spice of life, however, and I like to keep moving and keep challenging myself with new and exciting projects." Knight admitted that he had missed his singing career during his time on the show. He also refused to rule out a return to Holby City in the future. Knight confirmed that Harry's exit would be a "good ending". He was also pleased that Harry was not killed off, following his fall. Harry departed Holby with Mary-Claire, after proposing to her. As Mary-Claire prepared to leave for a job in the United States, she and Harry struggled to be honest with each other. Knight explained "Harry realises he can't let Mary-Claire slip through his fingers, but he's confused. He doesn't know what the future holds with regards to his facial injuries." Knight made his final appearance on 14 April 2015.

== Reception ==
Shortly after Harry's introduction, Inside Soap's Laura-Jayne Tyler quipped "Harry is certainly going to liven up the wards – and he's bound to set pulses racing!" She later commented, "charming doctor Harry has always had the gift of the gab". A reporter for the South Wales Echo branded Harry an "arrogant charmer". Closer's Kayleigh Dray dubbed him a "handsome scoundrel". Jane Simon from the Daily Mirror called Harry a "yummy doctor" and thought his new speciality should be "Lying To Consultants, which he definitely seems to have a natural flair for." Simon also wrote that Harry appeared to be trying to get through his training using "his nice eyes and pretty face alone", a similar tactic used by Oliver.

Simon later noted that Harry's jealously towards Mary-Claire's ex-boyfriend Tom "serves him right for the offhand way he's treated her in the past." She also called both men "arrogant, alpha males". A columnist for What's on TV labelled him "Holby's resident womaniser". Another contributor to the publication quipped, "Holby's Harry and Mary-Claire have been on and off more times than a light switch". When Knight's exit from the show was announced, the Daily Mirror's David Wigg and Mark Jefferies wrote "Flirty Harry made quite an impression on the nurses after first appearing on the BBC medical drama in 2013. His popular character soon earned the nickname Dr Love as he became the hospital bad boy."
