= Colette Sheward =

- Holby City character
- Louise Delamere as Colette Sheward
- First appearance: "Fait Accompli"; 3 December 2013
- Last appearance: "Chaos in Her Wings"; 4 November 2014
- Portrayed by: Louise Delamere

In-universe information
- Occupation: Director of Nursing Services
- Significant other: Guy Self; Adrian "Fletch" Fletcher

Colette Sheward is a fictional character from the BBC medical drama Holby City, played by actress Louise Delamere. She first appeared in the series sixteen episode "Fait Accompli", broadcast on 3 December 2013. Colette serves as the Director of Nursing Services at Holby City. Delamere was approached for the role and not required to audition. Colette is characterised as a "headstrong" and "compassionate" career woman who fiercely defends her team of nursing staff. Delamere decided that Colette should not have children to represent independent woman. But her solitary trait often leaves her isolated. Colette was introduced as an old friend of CEO Guy Self (John Michie). He offers the job without interviewing her which attracts internal scrutiny. Colette's role at the hospital demands respect from those in nursing roles. While she also maintains influence to reprimand doctors and consultants operating mistreating nurses. Jane Simon of the Daily Mirror predicted viewer popularity for Colette. She liked her brash persona and reporters from Inside Soap and What's on TV called her a "no-nonsense" character.

== Development ==
=== Casting ===
On 28 August 2013, the BBC released a statement detailing Delamere's casting as Colette Sheward. They revealed that the character would be introduced as the Director of Nursing. Billed as "tough-talking, politically incorrect, funny and loyal", Colette's inclusion would see the show's nursing team garner her fierce support. Delamere stated that she was pleased to join Holby City as such a "surprising and funny character". She was not required to audition for the role as she was directly approached by the production team. The actress was unsure that she wanted to role until she read the character breakdown. Colette's witty personality appealed to Delamere and she took the role on.

In October 2014, Laura-Jayne Tyler from Inside Soap confirmed that Delamere would be leaving the show.

=== Characterisation ===
Gregarious and mischievous, frank and decisive, Director of Nursing Colette runs Holby’s wards with sparky humour, vivacity and warmth. Tending to see in black and white, she can be gung-ho in her judgements, but whether championing or challenging, everyone knows exactly where they stand. Colette is fiercely loyal and protective of those she cares about.

— BBC Online.

Colette is characterised as a smart and compassionate nurse with a sense of humour. She conducts herself with a headstrong approach. But she is a "dark horse" with firm boundaries and refuses to let others get too close. Delamere told Kirsty Nutkins of the Daily Express that she is foremost a career woman and a "bit of a warrior". She makes it her duty to defend and speak in favour the hospital's nursing staff. But Colette demands respect from those who rank below her even if they are unwilling to show her any. Delamere explained that this trait "leads to some quite interesting confrontations." Colette holds high regard for authenticity in her staff because she dislikes phoniness. She tends to inspire while leading her team - but her solitary manner and reluctance to ask for help can make her feel isolated. Despite her strong personality, Colette is not "strident or bitchy".

Delamere based Colette's persona on her Aunt Jac, a nurse during the 1960s who "called a spade a spade" in her approach to work. Colette also sees herself as a role model to other women. Delamere explained that her character is a single and successful career woman who chose not to have children. She is unapologetic about her lifestyle and champions other women. She also noted that "she hasn't allowed life's challenges and disappointments to make her hard or bitter. Producers let Delamere decide that Colette should not have any children. She read a statistic that one in five British women aged over forty were not mothers and wanted to represent the "footloose and fancy-free" minority.

=== Introduction and Guy Self ===
"As director of nursing, she's in a position where she can stand up to doctors and get consultants sacked, so everyone needs to take her seriously."

—Delamere on Colette's role at Holby City hospital. (2013)

Colette debuts during the episode "Fait Accompli", broadcast on 3 December 2013. She arrives at the hospital a brain tumour patient named Sam Cummings (Daniel Abbott). Then it becomes clear that Colette previously worked with CEO Guy Self John Michie at another hospital. Delamere told Katy Moon [Inside Soap] that Colette has been estranged from Guy following the death of his wife. But Colette knows that he is the only one who can perform the necessary operation to save Sam's life. It is following a successful operation performed on Sam, which Colette orchestrated that Guy offers Colette a role at Holby City. She is hesitant and unsure of the offer; Delamere explained that Colette does not entirely trust Guy or know where he is at mentally. Their relationship had become "fraught" while he was grieving.

Michie told Daniel Kilkelly of Digital Spy that hiring Colette was a part of Guy's plan to establish his power over the hospital. Colette's first storyline block mainly involved working alongside Guy. Delamere told Natalie Dye from TV Choice that she and Michie instantly got on well. This worked well as the characters have a shared history. But their relationship is platonic and Delamere believed that any romance would ruin their "great working relationship". She added that they were trying to create a "more interesting" dynamic through the pair being "good friends". Michie explained that Colette is the only character that does not get reprimanded for speaking to him out of turn. Colette "knocks him off his pedestal" and humanises him via their friendship. She later suggested that the duo would make "great enemies" because they know each so well. Delamere soon revealed that the two would become estranged. Colette will find herself embroiled in a "stubborn spat" with Guy and his daughter Zosia March (Camilla Arfwedson) when she defends a colleague and defies "the point of principle".

=== Fletch ===
It was later announced that Adrian Fletcher (Alex Walkinshaw), a character from related series Casualty, would be joining Holby City. Producer Oliver Kent said that he envisioned a new male nurse who could "lock horns" with Colette. The pair are already acquainted and have "unresolved issues" which makes Fletch's new job complicated. A writer from Virgin Media said that Colette "will go out of her way to make his life difficult". Delamere later revealed that the new arrival would be "an unwelcome blast from the past who gets under Colette’s skin!"

Walkinshaw told Digital Spy's Kilkelly that Fletch was once engaged to Colette and their re-acquaintance on AAU is their first since their break-up. It comes as a shock to them both and it becomes apparent that there is a mixture of tension, banter and bickering between them. The actor added that there is some unresolved romantic feeling between them. Walkinshaw added that Colette does not like the fact that Fletch assumes the role ward manager and becomes her boss while on AAU. Delamere told Katy Moon from Inside Soap that Guy employs Fletch to annoy Colette. He knows that she stood Fletch up on their wedding day. But they later get on because there is "great chemistry" between them. Delamere believed that Colette and Fletch were good together and that she should have married him. But Colette decided to leave him because she wanted to experience relationships with different men.

== Storylines ==
Colette arrives at Holby City hospital to ask Guy to perform an operation on her brain tumour patient Sam. She explains that Sam's original surgeon would not operate and convinces Guy to go ahead with the successful operation. Guy offers Colette the Director of Nursing role which she accepts. Colette notices that Mary-Claire Carter (Niamh McGrady) is upset with Edward's treatment of her. She offers her support. The board become concerned that Colette did not undergo a supervised interview and may not meet the role requirements. Colette is later confronted by the human resources department who observe her methods of nursing. But Colette gets to keep her job. Colette supports Guy through troubled times with Zosia and tries to make peace between them. Colette creates a new role for Jonny Maconie (Michael Thomson) and clashes with Jac Naylor (Rosie Marcel) over the treatment of her nurses.

Guy becomes angry with Colette for keeping Zosia's romance with Jesse Law (Don Gilet) a secret. He employs Fletch as the new AAU ward manager to get revenge. Colette is annoyed by his presence because she left him on their wedding day. They argue with each other but it becomes clear that they still care for each other. Colette tries to make plan an evening with Guy but he declines in favour of Jac leaving her jealous.

== Reception ==
Jane Simon of the Daily Mirror predicted that viewers would "love Colette" due to her outspoken nature. She particularly liked her blunt attitude shown towards Harry Tressler (Jules Knight) and Guy all in her debut episode. Though Simon has criticised Colette not being interviewed for her job and her "not so catchy" self coined nickname the "Colletinator". Reporters from Inside Soap and What's on TV branded Colette a "no-nonsense" type character. Upon witnessing Colette clashing with Jac, a South Wales Echo reporter quipped "the Colette-Jac mind games are so frosty they could be an event in the Winter Olympics".
