= Alien Invasion (film) =

- Directed by: Hank Perlman
- Written by: Steven Henry
- Screenplay by: Steven Henry; Jason Macbeth
- Produced by: Adam Lyne; Emma Rookledge; Emma Gooding; Debbie Ninnis; Leonie Garner
- Starring: Eddie Izzard; Joseph McFadden; Jim Broadbent
- Cinematography: Rob Hardy
- Edited by: Alaster Jordan; Justin Anderson
- Music by: Bruce Woolley and the Radio Science Orchestra; Dave Stewart; Ben Darlow
- Production companies: HHCL/Red Cell; Hungry Man Productions
- Distributed by: Greenpeace; Pathé
- Release date: 23 September 2003 (United Kingdom)
- Running time: 4 minutes
- Country: United Kingdom
- Language: English

Alien Invasion, also known as Earth: A Crap Sandwich, is a 2003 short film that was produced as an advertisement for environmentalist causes. The film was produced by Greenpeace for charity, and was played in movie theatres and on television.

The short featured special effects from The Mill, and was directed by Hank Perlman at Hungry Man and produced by HHCL/Red Cell. All parties involved donated their time for free. The short premiered on 23 September 2003 at Warner Village locations in London, and was shown in cinemas the following month with distribution by Pathé.

== Characters ==
- Eddie Izzard as Brik
- Joseph McFadden as Zarg
- Jim Broadbent as Robin
