= Christopher Simon (actor) =

Australian actor and producer (born 1963)

- Born: 5 June 1963 (age 63); Sydney, Australia
- Occupations: Actor, film producer

Christopher Simon (born 5 June 1963) is an Australian actor and producer. Born in Sydney, Australia.

He produced the film Miss You Already directed by Catherine Hardwicke.

Simon is also a producer of such films as The Sweeney directed by Nick Love, Pusher, I, Anna, Still Life, Me and Me Dad, Boogie Woogie, The Proposition, Beyond the Ocean, The Trouble with Men and Women. He also produced short films by Joe Wright such as The End and Nick Love's Love Story.

Simon's various television acting roles include Eddie in The Long Firm, Pedro in Gimme Gimme Gimme, Michael Hassan in The Bill, Lee Andersen in Casualty, Abdel in Lovejoy, Samir in Ultimate Force, Da Souza in Lynda La Plante's Supply and Demand, Nathan Morgan in Wire in the Blood and he appeared in Lenny Henry in Pieces. Film acting roles include Room To Rent, The Delivery and O Jerusalem. He appeared as Hussein in the Tales of the Unexpected episode (9/8) "The Finger of Suspicion" (1988).

Simon has acted in such plays as 12 Angry Men and Taking Sides both directed by Harold Pinter in London's west end, The Kitchen directed by Stephen Daldry at the Royal Court, the Amnesty award-winning one man show When The Bulbull Stopped Singing for which he was nominated for the Acting Excellence Award (Best Actor) at the Edinburgh Festival Fringe, which premiered at the Traverse theatre and toured to Iran, New York and Jordan.

Other theatre roles include Welcome to Ramallah, which toured York and London, at the Arcola and the Theatre Royal York, The Present at the Royal Court and the Bush, and Poor Superman at the Hampstead and the Traverse.
