= Mary-Claire Carter =

- Holby City character
- Niamh McGrady as Mary-Claire Carter
- First appearance: "Spin"; 22 September 2009
- Last appearance: "Go the Distance"; 14 April 2015
- Portrayed by: Niamh McGrady
- Introduced by: Tony McHale

In-universe information
- Occupation: Agency Nurse; Staff Nurse
- Significant others: Greg Douglas; Edward Campbell; Harry Tressler

Mary-Claire Carter is a fictional character from the BBC medical drama Holby City, played by actress Niamh McGrady. She first appeared in the eleventh series episode "Spin", broadcast on 22 September 2009. The character was introduced by Tony McHale. Between her arrival and January 2013, Mary Claire appeared on a recurring basis, sometimes with months between appearances, as an agency nurse on Keller and AAU wards. McGrady was promoted to a regular cast member in early 2013 by newly appointed executive producer, Oliver Kent - alongside the introductions of three characters. Her first appearance, as a regular cast member, aired on 23 April when Mary-Claire received a staff nurse job on the AAU ward. She is characterised as a blunt and easily distracted character, yet a brilliant nurse. Her strong point is not diplomacy, but scratch beneath the surface and you'll find a heart of gold. McGrady has described her as "cheeky, flirtatious, and trouble."

In 2013, whilst a recurring cast member, McGrady filmed the first series of The Fall and the following year, chose to film a second series. In order to film the new series, McGrady temporarily departed Holby City and scenes airing on 22 April 2014 showed Mary-Claire depart to look after her sick mother in Ireland. Just over four months later, on 7 October, Mary-Claire's return scenes aired. Her main storyline following her return was her on-off relationship with Harry Tressler (Jules Knight), which fans took a strong liking to. In the episode airing on 14 April 2015, Mary-Claire and Harry departed from the show for their new life in Chicago, America after being engaged. Knight's exit was announced in February, while McGrady's decision to leave the show was not announced prior to the premiere of the episode, but revealed she had planned to leave.

== Casting ==
McGrady became a fan of Holby City while she was in a relationship with fellow actor Jalaal Hartley, who played Tom O'Dowd in the show from 2008 to 2009. She thought that it would be "a brilliant gig" if she was cast in a role. When the character of Mary-Claire came up, McGrady knew she had to have the part.

== Development ==
=== Characterisation ===
Mary-Claire can be blunt, lazy and insensitive. Diplomacy is definitely not her strong point, but scratch at the surface and you’ll find a lonely girl, with a heart of gold, who is desperate to find ‘the one’. She could be a brilliant nurse, if only she could just keep her mind on the job and learn to believe in herself.

— A reporter from the Holby City website on Mary-Claire (2013)

Mary-Claire has been described as "cheeky, flirtatious and good fun, yet vulnerable." Her independent side brings out a "determined and strong" nature. Executive producer, Oliver Kent said how Mary-Claire brought "charm, warmth and comedy" to the programme. McGrady has said how she shares some qualities with Mary-Claire, both being "gregarious, social and flirtatious" as well as "cheeky, lazy and naughty" McGrady also said how Mary-Claire needs to learn the true meaning of friendship.

=== Departure ===
In February 2015, McGrady's co-star Jules Knight (who plays Mary-Claire's love interest, Harry Tressler) announced his departure from the show. This left fans speculating whether the show planned to end the much-loved Harry and Mary-Claire's relationship. In the build-up to his exit, Mary-Claire had been offered as new job in Chicago by Colette Sheward (Louise Delamere) and Harry had been left facial disfigured following a fall from the hospital building. In scenes airing on 14 April 2015, Harry proposed to Mary-Claire in the back of an ambulance and when she accepted, they left for Chicago together. McGrady had left the series after five and a half years of playing Mary-Claire and to celebrate this a video was released on the Holby City website, reminding fans of the best bits from Harry and Mary-Claire. In an interview with Holby TV, McGrady spoke about her decision to leave the series, stating that she was "ready to go" and that she felt she had done "everything" she could do with the character. McGrady also revealed that show bosses waited until after she had returned from her break to write out both her and Knight's characters, commenting that it was a "good" decision and how "great" it was to see Mary-Claire and Harry develop prior to their exit.

== Reception ==
A reporter for the Daily Mirror stated "'Easily distracted' is a description that could have been invented for Mary-Claire Carter". A columnist for What's on TV commented, "Holby's Harry and Mary-Claire have been on and off more times than a light switch".
