= Sex, Chips & Rock n' Roll =

1999 British television series

- Genre: Music drama
- Created by: Debbie Horsfield
- Starring: Gillian Kearney; Emma Cooke; Sue Johnston; Phil Daniels; Joseph McFadden; David Threlfall
- Composer: Mike Moran
- Country of origin: United Kingdom
- Original language: English
- No. of series: 1
- No. of episodes: 6

Production
- Executive producers: Alex Graham; Gina Cronk
- Producer: Liz Trubridge
- Running time: 50 minutes
- Production company: Wall to Wall

Original release
- Network: BBC One
- Release: 5 September – 10 October 1999

Sex, Chips & Rock n' Roll is a six-part television historical drama which was written and created by Debbie Horsfield and directed by John Woods. It was produced by Wall to Wall for BBC One.

Originally shown in 1999, it was later adapted into a stage musical which appeared at Manchester's Royal Exchange Theatre in 2005.

== Synopsis ==
Set in Eccles, a suburb of Salford in 1965; the story focuses on the Brookes family, particularly twins Elloise and Arden Brookes. They live with their father, Howard, and grandmother, Irma, and work in their cousin Norman's chip shop. Arden is confident and considered the 'pretty' one, Ellie the quiet and clever one. Irma is 'moral guardian' of the family, a woman determined to control the lives of her family members.

Irma's nephew, Norman Kershawe, proposes to Ellie on her 18th birthday. Ellie thinks he is going to propose to Arden – particularly when he asks her to try the ring on and is about to remove it when Norman tells her they're engaged. Shocked but pleased, Ellie accepts but Arden is jealous. Fearing people will say she's on the shelf, she orders Ellie not to tell anyone. That night, the Ice Cubes, backing group of singer Larry Valentine, meet the girls in the chippy – introduced by Hayley, a friend of Arden's. Justin and Dallas are interested in the girls, tossing a coin to decide who will chase which girl. Dallas gets Arden and Justin gets Ellie. Arden likes Dallas and is happy to flirt with him but Ellie isn't interested in Justin. Hayley tells Arden about a talent contest where the winner will make a demo tape with a London record producer. Seeing it as an opportunity to escape, she and Ellie enter and is hopeful until Justin tells her that the winner is already decided. Unhappy, she challenges Larry (as judge) and he implies she'll win if they come to an "arrangement" but he lies.

Wanting to spend time with Ellie, Justin suggests they make a demo tape anyway as Dallas knows the record producer. Tex, 3rd member of the band, suggests Dallas and Ellie write a song together but they end up hiding from Larry as he entertains his girlfriend and then Norman and her grandmother as Norman is interested in buying the building from Larry. Not giving up, Justin takes them out to dinner, going to The Belvedere Hotel where Howard, the girls' father, works. He seats them at the best table but Irma is furious to find them there, insisting they leave with her. She tells them not to go out without her permission and tells Norman about Ellie dining out so he brings the wedding forward. Feeling suffocated, Ellie sleeps with Dallas but regrets it, remembering Arden, and tells Dallas she can't see him again. He is devastated and decides to end things with Arden but she won't listen. Trying again, Justin visits Irma. He impressed her when they met at The Belvedere and agrees to him taking Ellie out but accompanies them, much to Justin's dismay. Ellie also tells him that she's engaged so Justin gets drunk and tells Dallas and Tex that he slept with Ellie. Irma and Ellie visit and Dallas confronts Ellie about their one night stand and they arrange to meet. Unfortunately the conversation is recorded and Justin and Arden hear it. Angry with Ellie, Arden tells her she's pregnant but blames Dallas for not taking precautions, leading Ellie to discover she is pregnant too. Norman, (informed by Justin), punches Dallas and confronts Ellie, asking her to trust his assurance that she is better off with him and she agrees.

Following a showcase at the Carlton Ballroom, the Ice Cubes get a recording contract in London. Ellie tells Justin that she and Arden are pregnant and horrifies him with her decision to marry Norman and tell him that the baby's his. Justin suggests marrying him instead but she refuses. Ellie tells Dallas that Arden is pregnant and he proposes at Ellie and Norman's wedding so she goes to London with the Ice Cubes. Ellie goes with Norman initially but runs away when he's distracted. Dallas picks her up and she goes to London with them.

After the first two singles flop, Dallas and Ellie write a song together. Justin supports Ellie during her pregnancy and they share a room so people will think he's the baby's father. When the song is recorded, Arden and Ellie sing in the background and she kisses Dallas again but Arden and Justin catch them. Following a row with Arden, Ellie leaves. Unfortunately Norman sees her leave and takes her home, strongly implying he wants a proper marriage so she tells him that she's pregnant. Angry, Norman locks her in her room, convincing Irma it's in Ellie's best interests as there has been enough gossip. Ellie and Irma think she and Norman will raise Ellie's child together, telling people it's his. He doesn't disillusion them.

Unfortunately, Dallas and Arden's marriage isn't a success. They try to make the best of it but when Larry reveals that Arden is his newest client, Dallas confronts her and when Justin asks about the baby, she admits that she lied about being pregnant as she wanted to get married, like Ellie.

On a quick trip home, Howard discovers Irma's secret; she wasn't married as she claimed. She met Howard's father once at a concert, they had a one-night stand and she got pregnant. His family paid her and her family threw her out. Wanting respectability, Irma claimed to be a widow. Relieved, her family forgave her eventually. Devastated by this bombshell, Howard leaves and returns to the Ice Cubes for whom he has been acting as roadie. Following an escape attempt foiled by Norman, Ellie gives birth to a daughter, Iona. Irma assumes Justin is the father but is upset to discover that he isn't. Later that day, Irma tells her that she can go home and Norman reveals that he has arranged to have the baby adopted. Panicking, Ellie phones Arden, asking for her help but she hangs up, realising Dallas is the baby's father but knows she has to tell him. Following a TV appearance, Arden tells her father and the band that Ellie is in Manchester, has had a baby girl and that she will be adopted that evening. Rushing to the maternity home, Arden and her father discover that Ellie and the baby have gone and Howard stops Norman going after her. Howard is thrilled to learn that Irma gave Ellie the money she needed to get away.

Justin and Arden tell Dallas that he's the baby's father and on reading the birth certificate, realises where Ellie is. The series ends with Ellie and Dallas meeting on the beach at Iona and holding their daughter in their arms.

== Cast ==
- Ellie Brookes – Gillian Kearney
- Arden Brookes – Emma Cooke
- Irma Brookes – Sue Johnston
- Larry Valentine – Phil Daniels
- The Wolf – James Callis
- Tex Tunnicliffe – Julian Kerridge
- Dallas McCabe – Joseph McFadden
- Norman Kershawe – David Threlfall
- Alphonse – Brian Poyser
- Howard Brookes – Nicholas Farrell
- Hayley – Michelle Abrahams
- Clifford – Jim Hooper

== DVDs and CDs ==
- Sex, Chips & Rock n' Roll — released on DVD (Region 2) in the UK on 27 December 2001.
- "52 hits from the '60s and original songs from the BBC series" — soundtrack CD released in the UK on 1 October 1999
