= Dad Savage =

- Directed by: Betsan Morris Evans
- Written by: Steve Williams
- Produced by: Robert Jones; Gwynneth Lloyd
- Starring: Patrick Stewart; Kevin McKidd; Helen McCrory; Joe McFadden; Marc Warren; Jake Wood
- Cinematography: Gavin Finney
- Edited by: Guy Bensley
- Music by: Simon Boswell
- Distributed by: PolyGram Filmed Entertainment
- Release date: 5 June 1998
- Running time: 104 minutes
- Country: United Kingdom
- Language: English
- Budget: £3,500,000 (estimated)
- Box office: £14,250 (UK)

Dad Savage is a 1998 British crime film directed by Betsan Morris Evans starring Patrick Stewart as the title character, a tulip plantation owner, quasi-legal entrepreneur and 'cowboy'. The film was tagged as 'a tale of untamed revenge.'

A jeep carrying Dad Savage (Patrick Stewart) and H (Kevin McKidd) crashes through the wall of a deserted farmhouse and lands in the cellar. Of the three people inside the house—Bob (Joe McFadden), Vic (Marc Warren), and Chris (Helen McCrory). Accusing the three of killing his son Sav (Jake Wood), Dad pulls a rifle on them and orders them to talk.

== Cast ==
- Patrick Stewart as Dad Savage
- Kevin McKidd as H
- Helen McCrory as Chris
- Joe McFadden as Bob
- Marc Warren as Vic
- Jake Wood as Sav

== Reception ==
Variety called it "One of the weirdest mutts in the post-Tarantino litter so far" and said Stewart was miscast in the role. Time Out noted a likely influence by Shallow Grave and called it "tiresome muddle of vapid characters and threadbare plotting."
