= The Trouble with Men and Women =

2005 film

- Directed by: Tony Fisher
- Produced by: Christopher Simon
- Starring: Joseph McFadden; Kate Ashfield
- Release date: 29 January 2005 (Jakarta British Film Festival)
- Running time: 80 minutes
- Language: English

The Trouble with Men and Women is a 2005 film written and directed by Tony Fisher and starring Joseph McFadden and Kate Ashfield.

== Plot ==
Serious and intense Matt is tired of mooning over a woman who has deserted him for a life in the United States. After enduring the bar room philosophising of his friends as they vainly try to cheer him up, he starts dating various women, desperate for an understanding of the opposite sex. Yet he may well harbour the notion that it is his best mate's girlfriend that he is destined to be with.

== Cast ==
- Joseph McFadden – Matt
- Kate Ashfield – Susie
- Matthew Delamere – Vinnie
- Christine Tremarco – Karen

== Music ==
- Matt Cattell Innovation of Sound - Sam Gibb
