= Louise Delamere =

British actress

- Born: June 17, 1969, (age 57)
- Education: Royal Conservatoire of Scotland
- Occupation: Actress
- Years active: 1994–present
- Spouse: Stephen Mangan (m. 2007)
- Children: 3
- Relatives: Robert Delamere (brother)

Louise Delamere (born June 17, 1969) is an English actress, best known for her roles as Lia in the Channel 4 comedy drama No Angels and Colette Sheward in the BBC medical drama Holby City.

== Career ==
Delamere appeared in Agatha Christie's Poirot, in the episode Evil Under the Sun, where she played Arlena Stuart-Marshall, an actress who is murdered on a beach. She was featured in the Cadfael episode "The Holy Thief" and appeared in the BBC crime show Waking the Dead as Elaine Ashcroft, again playing a murder victim in the fourth season finale Thin Air.

She also had a role in the television drama The Chatterley Affair and has appeared in Torchwood. She played the recurring character Marion James in the fifth series of Waterloo Road. Delamere appeared as regular character Colette Sheward in BBC medical drama Holby City from 3 December 2013 until 4 November 2014.

She attended the Royal Scottish Academy of Music & Drama (now the Royal Conservatoire of Scotland) in Glasgow.

== Personal life ==
Delamere married actor Stephen Mangan in 2007. They have three sons together.

She has three brothers, including director Robert Delamere and actor Matthew Delamere.

== Filmography ==
Year	Title	Role	Notes
1995	Judge Dredd	Locker judge	
1995	Mad Dogs and Englishmen	Sandy	
1997	Cadfael	Dalney	Series 4, Episode "The Holy Thief"
1998	Game On	Laura	Series 3, Episode 5
2000	Born Romantic	Maria	
2000	Cor, Blimey!	Imogen	
2001	Agatha Christie's Poirot	Arlena Stuart-Marshall	Series 8, Episode 1: Evil Under the Sun
2001	Offending Angels	Lady in pub	
2002	Waking the Dead	Elaine Ashcroft	Thin Air, Parts one and two
2003	I'll Be There	Janice	
2004	Bullet Boy	Probation officer	
2004–2006	No Angels	Lia Costoya	Regular cast member
2005	Stories of Lost Souls	Woman	Segment: Euston Road
2006	Dalziel and Pascoe	Tracey Baxter	Episode: "Wrong Time, Wrong Place"
2006	Torchwood	Diane Holmes	Episodes: "Out of Time" and "End of Days"
2006	Daddy's Girl	Liz	
2006	Ancient Rome: The Rise and Fall of an Empire	Empress Fausta	Episode 5: "Constantine"
2006	Blue Murder	Lynne Aziz/Paula Hickson	Series 3, Episode 3: "The Spartacus Thing"
2006	The Chatterley Affair	Helena	
2007	Doc Martin	Carrie Wilson	Series 3, Episode 4
2009–2012	Waterloo Road	Marion James	Series 5, Series 7
2011	Inspector George Gently	Margaret Holdaway	Series 4, Episode 1 "Gently Upside Down"
2012	Vexed	Lucy Finch	Series 2, Episode 3
2013–2014	Holby City	Colette Sheward	Regular role
2014	Son of God	Claudia	
2016	Houdini & Doyle	Touie Doyle	
2024	Kidnapped: The Chloe Ayling Story	Susanna Reid	
