= Niamh McGrady =

Actress from Northern Ireland

- Born: 4 October 1982 (age 44); Castlewellan, County Down, Northern Ireland
- Education: Royal Welsh College of Music & Drama
- Occupation: Actress
- Spouse: Dan
- Children: 2

Niamh McGrady (born 4 October 1982) is a film, stage, and television actress from Castlewellan, County Down, Northern Ireland. She is best known for her parts as Mary-Claire Carter in Holby City, PC Danielle Ferrington in the psychological thriller The Fall, and Nicole Devine in Hope Street.

== Early life and education ==
Born and raised in Castlewellan, she attended Assumption Grammar School, Ballynahinch, County Down. From age 18, she trained at the Royal Welsh College of Music & Drama.

== Career ==
After landing a role in summer 2003 in Italy, on graduation she joined a Welsh production of Romeo and Juliet and then pantomime in Belfast, before moving to London for Northern Irish playwright Lisa McGee's production of Girls & Dolls. McGrady then featured in a production of the Shakespeare play Macbeth, starring Patrick Stewart. After a critically acclaimed run in London's West End, it then relocated to Broadway, New York City in 2008.

On return to London, she made her television début in the George Best biopic Best: His Mother's Son in 2009, but her part was eventually removed in the cutting room. Shortly afterwards she joined the cast of Holby City as a cast semi-regular, in the role of nurse Mary-Claire Carter.

After appearing in many short independent films through mainly uncredited roles, she was cast in the crime drama television series The Fall, based in Northern Ireland, alongside Gillian Anderson and Jamie Dornan. She rejoined the cast of Holby City in 2013 as a regular cast member, after which she gave-up her part-time waitressing and bar jobs. However, in early 2015, McGrady left Holby City to coincide with the departure of Jules Knight and their departure scenes aired in April 2015. From 2021 to the present she has been in the main cast as Nicole Devine in Hope Street.

== Acting credits ==
=== Television ===
Year	Title	Role	Notes
2009	Best: His Mother's Son	Martha Devine	
2009	Holby City	Mary-Claire Carter	Recurring role
2012	Doctors	Sarah Needham	1 episode
2012	Upstairs Downstairs	Enid Soaper	
2013–2015	Holby City	Mary-Claire Carter	Regular role
2013–2016	The Fall	P.C Danielle Ferrington	Regular role
2014	Crossing Lines	Rose McConnell	2 episodes
2018	Midsomer Murders	Penny Kingdom	Episode: "Death of the Small Coppers"
2019	Moving On	Kelly	Episode "Beaten"
2019	Doctors	Zoe Hammond	Episode: "Sisterhood"
2020	Shakespeare & Hathaway: Private Investigators	Cassie Dorcas	Episode: "Teach Me, Dear Creature"
2020	Pan Tau	Caroline	English reboot, 2 episodes
2021–present	Hope Street	Nicole Devine	Main role
2022	Sister Boniface Mysteries	Libby Mayfield	Episode: "Unnatural Causes"

=== Film ===
Year	Title	Role	Notes
2009	MacBeth	Witch	
2011	Bats and Balls	Girl	Short Film
2012	Thank you for coming	Sara	Short Film
2017	Maze	Jill	
2020	Nowhere Special	Lorraine	

=== Stage ===
Year	Title	Role	Notes
2016	Night Must Fall	Olivia	UK Theatre tour
2009	The Building site	Shauna	Arcola Theatre
2009	Girls and Dolls	Clare	Old Red Lion, Islington
2008	MacBeth	Witch	BAM and Lyceum Theatre on Broadway
2007	MacBeth	Witch	Chichester Festival Theatre & Gielgud Theatre
2007	Twelfth Night	Olivia's Maid	Chichester Festival Theatre
2006	Jack and the Beanstalk	Princess Jill	Waterfront Hall, Belfast
2005	Romeo and Juliet	Juliet and Mercutio	Volcano Theatre Company
2003	A life of the Mind	Sally	Royal Welsh College
2003	Ecstasy	Mary Fisher	Royal Welsh college
2003	The Importance of being earnest	Cecily	Royal Welsh College
2002	King Lear	Regan	Royal Welsh College
2001	Three Sisters	Masha	Royal Welsh College
