= Joe McFadden =

Scottish actor (born 1975)

- Born: Joseph McFadden; 9 October 1975 (age 51); Glasgow, Scotland
- Education: Holyrood Secondary School
- Occupation: Actor
- Years active: 1988–present

Joseph McFadden (born 9 October 1975) is a Scottish actor, best known for his roles in The Crow Road, Sex, Chips & Rock n' Roll, Heartbeat, Holby City, and Take The High Road. He won the fifteenth series of the BBC One series Strictly Come Dancing with professional dance partner Katya Jones in 2017.

== Biography ==
The third of four siblings (two older brothers, one younger sister), McFadden was born on 9 October 1975, in Glasgow to Irish immigrants from County Donegal. He was educated at Holyrood R.C. Secondary School in Glasgow, where a drama teacher recognised his talent and recommended him for a part in the ITV Glasgow-based detective show Taggart.

After taking a role playing mischievous teenager, Gary McDonald, in Take the High Road, he developed his career in the theatre with roles in a number of diverse productions, such as Chitty Chitty Bang Bang, Rent and Rainbow Kiss at the Royal Court. He then returned to television work with roles in The Crow Road and Sex, Chips & Rock n' Roll. He played the title role of Aladdin at The Old Vic opposite Ian McKellen and played Dr Jack Marshland in the original series of the Emmy award-winning Cranford. After that he came to national attention playing PC Joe Mason in the ITV Yorkshire-based period drama Heartbeat from 2007 to its finale in 2010.

After that role ended in 2009, he mixed theatre doing National Theatre of Scotland with director John Tiffany and touring in the Alan Ayckbourn play Haunting Julia and the Harvey Fierstein play Torch Song Trilogy playing Ed. He has also starred in such films as The Trouble with Men and Women, Zig Zag Love, Dad Savage and Small Faces.

From January 2014 to December 2017 he had a leading role as Raffaello "Raf" di Lucca in the BBC One medical drama Holby City. The character was killed off in the two part episode "Group Animal". In August 2017 he was announced as a participant in the fifteenth series of BBC's Strictly Come Dancing, partnered with Katya Jones, eventually winning the prized Glitterball Trophy.

Since then he has appeared in numerous theatre productions, including playing The Narrator in the UK tour of The Rocky Horror Show, Tick/Mitzi in Priscilla, Queen of the Desert, Sam in 2:22 A Ghost Story at the Gielgud Theatre in London and Andy Dufresne in The Shawshank Redemption.

== Personal life ==
He announced his engagement to artist Rob Smales in an Instagram post on 24 September 2024.

== Selected filmography ==
- Strictly Come Dancing (2017)
- Holby City (2014–2017, 2020)
- Casualty (2009)
- Cranford (2007)
- Heartbeat (2007–2010)
- Alien Invasion (2004; short film)
- The Trouble with Men and Women (2003)
- Harry Potter and the Chamber of Secrets (2002; video game voice actor)
- Sparkhouse (2002)
- The Glass (2001)
- Sex, Chips & Rock n' Roll (1999)
- Dad Savage (1998)
- Small Faces (1996)
- The Crow Road (1996)
- Take the High Road (1990–97)

== Theatre ==
- Ed in The Curious Incident of the Dog in the Night-Time, UK tour, 2026
- Andy Dufresne in The Shawshank Redemption, UK tour, 2025
- Sam in 2:22 A Ghost Story at the Gielgud Theatre, London, August 2024
- Narrator in The Rocky Horror Show, 2023
- Jason Rudd in The Mirror Crack'd, UK Tour 2022
- Oliver Harcourt in The House on Cold Hill, UK Tour, January 2019
- Andy in Haunting Julia, UK Tour, August 2012
- Ed in Torch Song Trilogy, Menier Chocolate Factory, London May 2012
- Writer in The Missing, National Theatre of Scotland, Tramway Arts Centre September 2011
- Georg Nowack in She Loves Me, Chichester Festival Theatre 2011
- Caractacus Potts in Chitty Chitty Bang Bang, Edinburgh Playhouse 2006–7
- Finch in How to Succeed in Business Without Really Trying, Chichester Festival Theatre 2005
- Keith in Rainbow Kiss at Royal Court Theatre, London 2006
- John in A Life in the Theatre at Royal Lyceum Theatre Edinburgh 2004
- Claude in 15 Seconds at Traverse Theatre, Edinburgh 2003
- Mark in Rent at Shaftesbury Theatre, London 1998
- Sloane in Entertaining Mr Sloane at Theatr Clwyd, 1997
