= Wendy Kweh =

Singaporean actress

Wendy Kweh is an actress of Chinese descent born in Singapore. She migrated to the United Kingdom in 1995. She lives in London.

== Education ==
She is a RADA graduate in London.

== Career ==
She made a guest appearance in 2000 before getting a regular part as DC Suzie Sim in the ITV police drama The Bill from 2004 until 2006. She also appeared in Coronation Street during 2004. She played the blind physiotherapist Zoe in the BBC World Service soap, Westway. In 2014, she played Amy Teo in Holby City.
