= Jules Knight =

English actor and singer

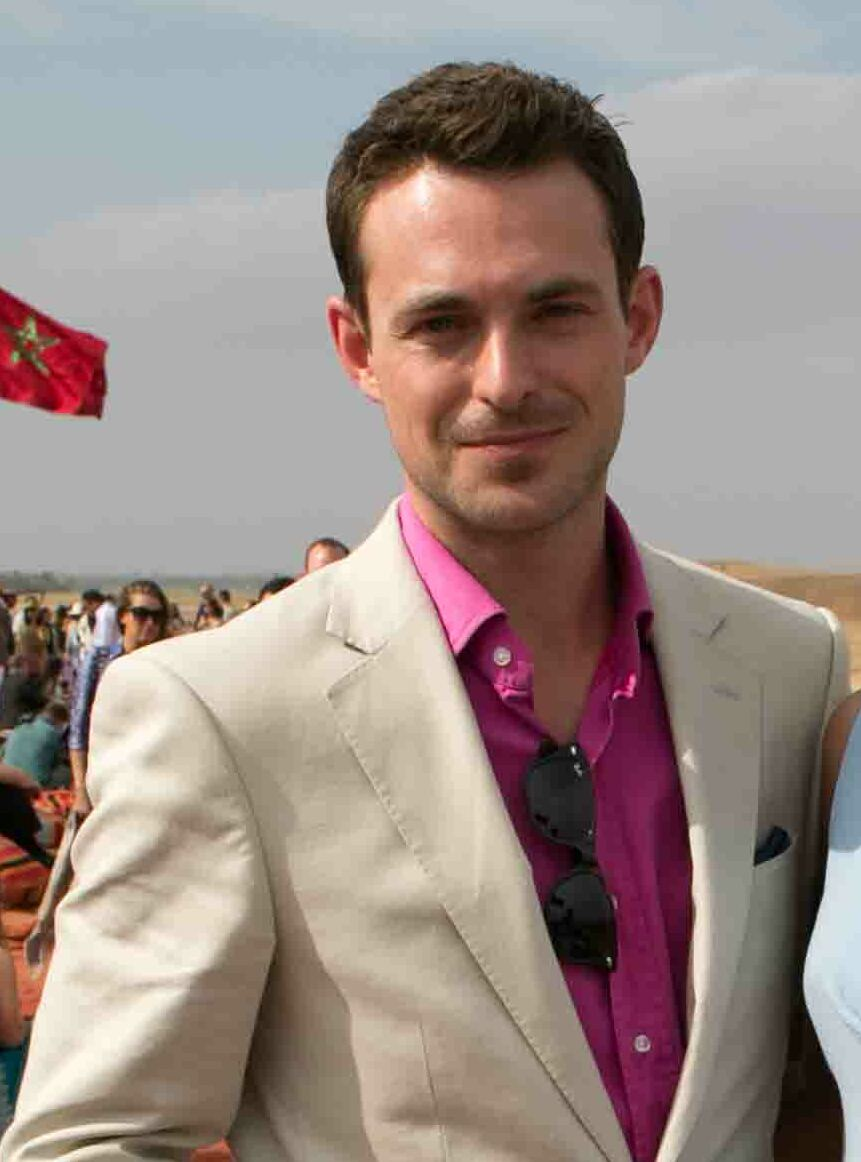
- Knight at British Polo Day Morocco 2014
- Born: Julian Kaye; 22 September 1981 (age 44); Hastings, East Sussex, England
- Education: Royal Central School of Speech and Drama
- Occupations: Actor, singer
- Known for: Blake; Holby City

Julian "Jules" Knight (né Kaye; born 22 September 1981) is an English actor and singer. He is best known for being a member of the British vocal group Blake and his portrayal of Harry Tressler in the medical drama Holby City. He left Blake in January 2013 and first appeared in Holby City as doctor Harry Tressler on 14 May 2013. Knight left Holby City on 14 April 2015.

== Early life ==
Knight was born in Hastings, lived in Robertsbridge and attended Vinehall School. At the age of seven, Knight became a choirboy at Winchester Cathedral. This meant he had to switch to The Pilgrims' School which was closer to the cathedral. When he was thirteen, he sang solo at the Sydney Opera House. In sixth form, Knight won a scholarship to Eastbourne College. At the time, he was living between Battle, Sedlescombe, Hooe, Hawkhurst and Benenden, all in Kent and East Sussex. He sang at Wells Cathedral during his gap year. He then attended the University of St Andrews and studied history of art, where he performed in several plays and musicals and was a member of The Other Guys. He also attended the Central School of Speech and Drama, where he received an MA in acting.

== Career ==
=== Blake ===
In June 2007, Knight and three others formed the band Blake on Facebook. Just two days after the band first got together, they got a record deal. Knight left his role in Blake in January 2013 to join Holby City.

=== Acting ===
In January 2013, Knight was told that he had won the part of Harry Tressler in Holby City after doing four auditions over two and a half months. To prepare for the role, he shadowed a senior consultant for a day, and observed a laparotomy. In February 2015, Knight quit Holby City to relaunch his music career. Harry would leave in May 2015 during a storyline which would make Harry "unrecognisable".

Knight appears as Guy Freemont in the crime drama Agatha Raisin.

In June 2016, Knight was cast in the recurring role of Spencer Koenigsberg, Queen Helena's new Lord Chamberlain, on The Royals.

=== Solo career ===
In February 2015, it was announced that Knight had decided to relaunch his music career, with a solo album after previously having been in a band. Discussing his new career path, he stated: "In many ways making a solo album is a totally natural progression for me and has been a long time coming." He also expressed his excitement over his new choice in career. Speaking about the album, he said: "The connection between them is that they're all poignant, emotive songs that have affected me in some way in my life, and will hopefully strike a chord with people of all ages. The songs span a wide range of musical genres, so the album is for anyone who has an all-embracing passion for music." He also said that the album would be a "collection of new and old songs" which have all been given some "treatment" by Knight. The album was given the title Change of Heart and scheduled for release on 27 April 2015.

== Personal life ==
Knight has three siblings from his father John Kaye's second marriage. Knight previously dated Ciara Janson. Knight took in a dog from Battersea Dogs and Cats Home.

== Solo discography ==
- Change of Heart (2015)

== Filmography ==
Year	Title	Role	Notes
2008	Katherine Jenkins: Intimate & Romantic	Himself	Television film
2010	William & Kate: A Royal Engagement	Himself	Television film
2012	William at 30	Himself	Television film
2013–2015	Holby City	Harry Tressler	Series regular
2016	Agatha Raisin	Guy Freemont	TV series/Guest
2016–2017	The Royals	Spencer Hoenigsberg	TV series/Recurring
