= Richard Ommanney =

English writer

- Occupations: Writer, actor
- Years active: 1985–present
- Spouse(s): Miranda Messenger (1977–1990); Louisa Rix (1994–present)
- Children: 2

Richard Ommanney is an English writer who has written mainly for TV. He initially trained as an actor at the Central School Of Speech and Drama.

On TV, Ommanney appeared in Get Some In!, Red Letter Day, The Dragon's Opponent, and Jane Eyre, in which he played Stephanie Beacham's onscreen brother Lord Ingram.

In 1973/74, Ommanney spent a year in the West End at the Savoy Theatre in A Ghost on Tiptoe which starred Robert Morley. In 1976, Ommanney spent three months in Holland filming A Bridge Too Far, directed by Richard Attenborough.

His final appearance on stage was at the Citizens Theatre in Glasgow, alongside Pierce Brosnan and Ciaran Hinds in the world premiere of Noël Coward's Semi-Monde. In 1985, Ommanney made his situation comedy writing debut with the BBC sitcom Three Up, Two Down. The first series topped the ratings and was followed by three more. Three Up Two Down has been optioned four times by American TV: in 1989, Ommanney spent five months in Los Angeles working on a pilot of the show with Winifred Hervey for CBS, where it became Five Up Two Down.

Ommanney wrote the first series of All at No 20, which starred Maureen Lipman and Martin Clunes. Also in the cast was Gregory Doran, who was eventually to run the Royal Shakespeare Company. Ommanney created and wrote two series of the yuppie love triangle Square Deal for LWT. The series starred Tim Bentinck, who went on to co-star in Made in Heaven with Louisa Rix. Bentinck wrote an account of Ommanney and Louisa Rix meeting for the first time in his book. Ommanney created and wrote two series of the sitcom Side by Side for BBC TV, starring Rix and Gareth Hunt.

Ommanney wrote many episodes for Dutch TV comedy series, including Oppassen!, Ben zo Terug, Bergen Binnen, and the police drama Luifel & Luifel.

Ommanney wrote eight episodes of the police drama The Bill. He ghosted film-maker Daryl Goodrich's account of his promotional films that helped secure the 2012 Olympic Games for London. Ommanney's first stage play, The Making Of Julia, was produced at The Mill at Sonning. His first novel, Jerome's Angel was a romantic comedy.

== Personal life ==
Ommanney has two daughters, Sophie & Lisa. He married Louisa Rix in 1994, and has two step-children, Charlotte & Jolyon Coy.
