= Side by Side (TV series) =

- Genre: Sitcom
- Created by: Richard Ommanney
- Starring: Gareth Hunt; Louisa Rix; Julia Deakin; Mia Fothergill; Alex Walkinshaw
- Country of origin: United Kingdom
- Original language: English
- No. of series: 2
- No. of episodes: 13

Production
- Running time: 30 minutes

Original release
- Network: BBC1
- Release: 27 April 1992 – 1 April 1993

Side by Side is a British sitcom starring Gareth Hunt and Louisa Rix that was broadcast for two series from 1992 to 1993. It was written by Richard Ommanney, who had also written Three Up, Two Down.

== Cast ==
- Gareth Hunt – Vince Tulley
- Louisa Rix – Gilly Bell
- Julia Deakin – Stella Tulley
- Mia Fothergill – Katie Bell
- Alex Walkinshaw – Terry Shane

== Plot ==
Vince Tulley is a successful and relatively wealthy plumber who lives in Kingston upon Thames in Surrey, with his wife Stella. He enjoys adding bizarre and unusual features to both the inside and outside of his house, including a windmill and mock Acropolis. His neighbour, Gilly Bell, is recently widowed and bringing up her daughter Katie. Gilly hates Vince's additions as she feels he is bringing down the tone of the neighbourhood, although she gets on very well with Vince's easy-going wife, Stella. Terry Shane, Vince's nephew and assistant, has a love-hate relationship with Katie.

== Episodes ==
Series One had six episodes, which aired weekly from 27 April until 1 June 1992. Series Two had seven episodes, which aired weekly from 18 February until 1 April 1993.
