= Semi-Monde =

Semi-Monde is a play written by Noël Coward in 1926, but not produced until 1977. Set in the foyer, lounge and bars of a grand Paris hotel, the play follows the lives of a variety of socialites over a three-year period from 1925. It is notable among works of the period for its prominent treatment of sexuality, both straight and gay.

== Background and first production ==
Coward wrote the play during a long American tour starring in his play The Vortex. The piece is set in the public rooms of a grand hotel in Paris over a period of three years. In the published text the hotel is unnamed, but Coward said it was based on the Ritz and originally titled the play Ritz Bar; the Ritz in Paris, like its namesake in London, had a bar known for its homosexual clientele.

The author said of the play a decade after he wrote it, "It was well constructed and, on the whole, well written", but added that its production in London or New York had seemed unlikely "as some of the characters, owing to lightly suggested abnormalities, would certainly be deleted by the censor". Basil Dean announced plans to produce the work in the US, but this failed to materialise. The German producer Max Reinhardt expressed interest in the play, which was translated into German. His planned production never reached the stage, and, as Coward put it, "eventually Vicki Baum wrote Grand Hotel, and Semi-Monde, being too closely similar in theme, faded gently into oblivion".

Semi-Monde, was first produced on 11 September 1977 by the Glasgow Citizens Theatre, directed by Philip Prowse. The production ran for 21 performances.

=== Original cast ===
- Pierrot – John Doyle
- Young girl – Madalyn Morgan
- Young man – Richard Ommanney
- Waiter – Dafydd Burne-Jones
- Tanis Marshall – Pauline Moran
- Dorothy Price – Katherine Kitovitz
- Suzanne Fellini – Sian Thomas
- Mike Craven – Patrick Hannaway
- Beryl Fletcher – Robin Pappas
- Beverly Ford – Robin Hooper
- Cyril Hardacre – Rory Edwards
- Albert Hennick – Paul Geoffrey
- Owen Marshall – Paul Bentall
- Inez Zulietta – Anne Mitchell
- Cynthia Gable – Angela Chadfield
- Marion Fawcett – Jean Gilpin
- Jerome Kennedy – Mark Lewis
- Norma Kennedy – Corinna Seddon
- Julius Levonovitch – Brian Jennings
- Elise Trent – Alison Mullin
- Harry Leftwich – Pierce Brosnan
- George Hudd – Christopher Jagger
- Luke Bellows – Garry Cooper
- Joshua Drake – Richard Rees
- Freddy Palmer – Ciarán Hinds
- Mrs Hancox – Linda Spurrier
- Phyllis Hancox – Suzan Crowley
- A German gentleman – Giles Havergal
- Bell Boy – Alun Wright
- Pianist – Robert David Macdonald

Since 1977 there have been amateur and student productions, and a one-off charity gala performance was given at the Royalty Theatre, London in 1987, by a cast including Judi Dench, Adam Faith, Patricia Hodge, Evelyn Laye, Joanna Lumley, June Whitfield and Michael Williams. The only full professional staging since the Glasgow premiere was at the Lyric Theatre, London, in 2001. Prowse again directed. The cast was headed by Nichola McAuliffe, John Carlisle, Sophie Ward, Ben Bates and Georgina Hale.

== Synopsis ==
In Mander and Mitchenson's Theatrical Companion to Coward, the authors write that it is impossible to synopsise Semi-Monde in detail because so much of it consists of passing incidental action as characters come and go, but the world of the play is "one of shrieking, bitchy, self-conscious intrigue … probably the most accurate stage representation of the twenties milieu Coward inhabited that we have".

Coward's biographer Philip Hoare summarises the piece thus:

In a chic Parisian hotel, a series of sexual pairings take place through rendezvous, arguments, infidelities and reconciliations; sexual deviance is undisguised, and it appears to have been written for a very sophisticated audience.

The first act presents the various characters. It is set in the hotel lobby, bars and lounge across the three years 1925–1927, and opens with a newly-wed, Tanis Marshall, awaiting her husband, Owen. Coward then introduces queer couples: Inez Zuleika and Cynthia Gable bicker at each other, and Beverley Ford has a younger man, Cyril Hardacre, in tow. They are joined by the camp Albert Hennick. The Companion remarks that "clandestine affairs and betrayal feature prominently in a decadent atmosphere"

In the second act the tensions of the first come to the surface. A couple seen honeymooning in Act 1 are by now having affairs: the man (Owen) with the daughter (Norma) of his wife's lover (Jerome). At the climax one of the straight characters shoots a rival in the bar. In Hoare's words:

Coward's themes – decadence, moral hypocrisy, homosexual oppression – tumble over one another in near-hysteria in the partner-swapping orgy. The play ends with a bare resolution of the turmoil, the restoration of normality and the heterosexual balance – a submission to the status quo.

Jerome sums up events: "We're all silly animals, gratifying our beastly desires, covering them with a veneer of decency and good behaviour. ... There's nothing to be done, you know – nothing at all".

== Sources ==
- Coward, Noël (2004) [1932]. Present Indicative – Autobiography to 1931. London: Methuen. ISBN 978-0-413-77413-2.
- Hoare, Philip (1995). Noël Coward, A Biography. London: Sinclair-Stevenson. ISBN 978-1-4081-0675-4.
- Lahr, John (1982). Coward the Playwright. London: Methuen. ISBN 978-0-413-48050-7.
- Mander, Raymond; Mitchenson, Joe (2000) [1957]. Barry Day; Sheridan Morley (eds.). Theatrical Companion to Coward (second ed.). London: Oberon. ISBN 978-1-84002-054-0.
