= Square Deal (TV series) =

- Genre: Sitcom
- Created by: Richard Ommanney
- Directed by: Nic Phillips
- Starring: Lise-Ann McLaughlin; Tim Bentinck; Brett Fancy; Angus Barnett
- Theme music composer: Brian Bennett
- Country of origin: United Kingdom
- Original language: English
- No. of series: 2
- No. of episodes: 14

Production
- Executive producer: Marcus Plantin
- Producer: Nic Phillips
- Production locations: London, England, UK
- Running time: 30 minutes
- Production company: LWT

Original release
- Network: ITV
- Release: 3 September 1988 – 13 October 1989

Square Deal is a British sitcom created by Richard Ommanney which ran for two series between 3 September 1988 and 13 October 1989 on the ITV network. The series starring Lise-Ann McLaughlin and Tim Bentinck as Nigel and Emma Barrington, a yuppie couple whose apparently comfortable lifestyle is brusquely shaken by the arrival on the scene of Sean, an incurable and impoverished young romantic. It was produced by LWT.

== Plot ==
Sean Hooper (Brett Fancy) is a starry-eyed sandwich maker who has given himself until his next birthday to make a success of his life. Shortly after, he meets a woman named Emma with whom he purchases a café. They combine her business knowledge and his cooking expertise to make it a success.

With Sean on the scene, Nigel and Emma's relationship rapidly deteriorates, and a love triangle emerges, first in Nigel's mind and then in reality, as Emma realises that, for all his quirks, Sean is more fun to be with than her husband. An estate agent with a cunning mind, Nigel proceeds to wreck his wife's café plans by gazumping her, and talk of a divorce is soon in the air. Later (in the second series) Sean turns his attentions to rock singing, becoming a fledgling star, while Nigel becomes Sean's landlord and develops an interest in his new neighbour, Geraldine (Georgina Melville).

== Cast ==
- Lise-Ann McLaughlin as Emma Barrington
- Tim Bentinck as Nigel Barrington
- Brett Fancy as Sean Hooper
- Angus Barnett as Alan
- Jeremy Sinden as Max Grout
- Jo McEvoy as Sally
- Beth Porter as Hannah (series 1)
- Frank Ellis as Brian (series 2)
- Georgina Melville as Geraldine Gunter-Forbes (series 2)
- Anthony Daniels as Julian Pickford

== Episodes ==
=== Series overview ===
| Series | Episodes | Originally released | |
| Series | Episodes | First released | Last released |
|---|---|---|---|
| 1 | 7 | 3 September 1988 | 15 October 1988 |
| 2 | 7 | 1 September 1989 | 13 October 1989 |

=== Series 1 (1988) ===
| No. | Title | Directed by | Written by | Original release date |
|---|---|---|---|---|
| 1 | "Episode 1" | Nic Phillips | Richard Ommanney | 3 September 1988 |
| 2 | "Episode 2" | Nic Phillips | Richard Ommanney | 10 September 1988 |
| 3 | "Episode 3" | Nic Phillips | Richard Ommanney | 17 September 1988 |
| 4 | "Episode 4" | Nic Phillips | Richard Ommanney | 24 September 1988 |
| 5 | "Episode 5" | Nic Phillips | Richard Ommanney | 1 October 1988 |
| 6 | "Episode 6" | Nic Phillips | Richard Ommanney | 8 October 1988 |
| 7 | "Episode 7" | Nic Phillips | Richard Ommanney | 15 October 1988 |

=== Series 2 (1989) ===
| No. | Title | Directed by | Written by | Original release date |
|---|---|---|---|---|
| 8 | "Episode 1" | Nic Phillips | Richard Ommanney | 1 September 1989 |
| 9 | "Episode 2" | Nic Phillips | Richard Ommanney | 8 September 1989 |
| 10 | "Episode 3" | Nic Phillips | Richard Ommanney | 15 September 1989 |
| 11 | "Episode 4" | Nic Phillips | Richard Ommanney | 22 September 1989 |
| 12 | "Episode 5" | Nic Phillips | Richard Ommanney | 29 September 1989 |
| 13 | "Episode 6" | Nic Phillips | Richard Ommanney | 6 October 1989 |
| 14 | "Episode 7" | Nic Phillips | Richard Ommanney | 13 October 1989 |

== Reception ==
In a positive review, James Green wrote in The Stage and Television Today, "On the casting side the best thing is the impossibly pretty Lise-Ann McLaughlin as the fore-mentioned wife. How Timothy Bentinck, as her estate-agent husband can act the lord and master in these times of feminine independence is criminal. She not only looks superb but is expected to work at the do-it-yourself chores to put a few more thousands on the home." The historian Mark Lewisohn called the show "modestly successful, if flawed".
