= Alex Walkinshaw =

English actor (born 1974)

- Born: Alex Newcombe Walkinshaw; 5 October 1974 (age 51); Barking, London, England
- Occupation: Actor
- Television: The Bill; Waterloo Road; Casualty; Holby City; EastEnders
- Spouse: Sarah Trusler (m. 2009; div. 2019)
- Children: 2
- Relatives: Jodie Marsh (cousin)

Alex Newcombe Walkinshaw (born 5 October 1974) is an English actor. After making his professional acting debut in 1990, he has since played roles including Dale "Smithy" Smith in the ITV police procedural series The Bill, Adrian "Fletch" Fletcher in BBC medical dramas Casualty and Holby City, Jez Diamond in the BBC school-based drama series Waterloo Road and Ross Marshall in the BBC soap opera EastEnders.

== Early life ==
Walkinshaw was born on 5 October 1974 in Barking, London. In between acting jobs in the 1990s, he also worked as a labourer, office fitter and at a snooker hall in Barking. He is the cousin of television personality and model Jodie Marsh.

== Career ==
Walkinshaw's first television appearance was at the age of 12 as an extra in Grange Hill, where he stayed for a year. From 1992 to 1993, he appeared in the sitcom Side by Side. He first appeared in The Bill in three episodes as a guest star in 1992, 1993 and 1995, before joining as a regular cast member in 1999. It was whilst he was acting at the Royal Court Theatre that he was spotted by one of the producers of The Bill and was encouraged to audition for the programme. He joined The Bill as PC Dale Smith, better known as "Smithy". He departed from the series in 2001, but eventually returned. In 2008, he was nominated for Outstanding Drama Performance at the National Television Awards. The award was won by David Tennant. After The Bill was axed in 2010 by ITV, Walkinshaw admitted that "It was emotional shooting the final scenes" and that he found it "tough" to leave behind some of his co-stars.

In 2011, Walkinshaw was cast in Waterloo Road as PE teacher Jeremy 'Jez' Diamond. Following his departure from the show, he joined the cast of Casualty as nurse Adrian "Fletch" Fletcher. In 2014, the character made a permanent switch from Casualty to its sister show Holby City. He appeared in Holby City until its final episode.

In 2025, it was announced that Walkinshaw had been cast in the BBC soap opera EastEnders as Ross Marshall, the partner of established character Vicki Fowler (Alice Haig). Walkinshaw had previously stated in 2008 that he would like to appear in the soap one day.

== Personal life ==
During his time on The Bill, Walkinshaw met his wife Sarah, who worked as a make-up artist on the show. They married on 20 June 2009 at the Queen's House in Greenwich, London and lived in Kent with their two children. They split in 2019 after it was revealed he had exchanged raunchy texts with a model behind his wife's back.

Walkinshaw undertakes local charity work and is the patron for the St Thomas' Lupus Trust. On 24 March 2007, he took part in The Weakest Link and won £9,450, which he donated to Essex-based charity "Kids in Need", which grants wishes for underprivileged, sick and terminally ill children. On 2 May 2007, he opened a new community police office in Chislehurst, for the Safer Neighbourhood teams from Chislehurst and Mottingham.

== Filmography ==
| Year | Title | Role | Notes |
|---|---|---|---|
| 1990 | Death in Venice | Older Boy | Television film |
| 1992–1993 | Side by Side | Terry Shane | Main role |
| 1992 | The Bill | Steven Murray | Episode: "Fair Play" |
| 1992 | Casualty | Alan | Episode: "Money Talks" |
| 1993 | A Question of Guilt | Ed Darvas | Television film |
| 1993 | Scene | Danny | Episode: "Pig Boy" |
| 1993 | The Bill | Lee Tarrant | Episode: "Deadly Weapon" |
| 1993 | To Play the King | Boy Mugger | Episode: "Chapter Five" |
| 1994 | Harry Enfield & Chums | Unwanted party guest | 1 episode |
| 1994 | Screen Two | Cockney | Episode: "O Mary This London" |
| 1994 | Nelson's Column | Colin | Episode: "Back to Basics" |
| 1994 | Anna Lee | Kevin | Episode: "Requiem" |
| 1995 | Crown Prosecutor | Troy Daly | 1 episode |
| 1995 | The Bill | Andy Franklin | Episode: "Flora and Fauna" |
| 1995 | A Touch of Frost | Pearce | Episode: "Appropriate Adults" |
| 1995 | London's Burning | Mark | 1 episode |
| 1995–1998 | McCallum | DS Small | Regular role |
| 1999–2001, 2003-2010 | The Bill | Dale Smith | Regular role |
| 2001 | Holby City | Mickey | Episode: "Starting Over" |
| 2001 | Urban Gothic | Stevo | Episode: "Sandman" |
| 2002 | Stan the Man | Tommy | 1 episode |
| 2011–2012 | Waterloo Road | Jez Diamond | Main role |
| 2012–2014, 2016, 2019–2020, 2022 | Casualty | Adrian "Fletch" Fletcher | Main role |
| 2014−2022 | Holby City | Adrian "Fletch" Fletcher | Main role |
| 2022 | Midsomer Murders | Sam Engells | Episode: "The Debt of Lies" |
| 2025–present | EastEnders | Ross Marshall | Regular role |

== Awards and nominations ==
| Year | Ceremony | Category | Nominated work | Result | Ref. |
|---|---|---|---|---|---|
| 2008 | 14th National Television Awards | Outstanding Drama Performance | The Bill | Nominated | |
| 2020 | Inside Soap Awards | Best Drama Star | Holby City | Nominated | |
| 2022 | Inside Soap Awards | Best Drama Star | Holby City | Nominated | |
