= Louisa Rix =

British actress, interior designer (born 1955)

The Honourable Louisa Rix
- Born: Louisa MacGregor Rix; 2 February 1955 (age 71); Kensington, London, England
- Occupations: Actress, interior designer
- Years active: 1970s–2012 (acting)
- Spouses: Jonathan Coy (m. 1980–1990) Richard Ommanney (m. 1994)
- Children: 2, including Jolyon

Louisa MacGregor Rix (born 2 February 1955) is a British former actress of theatre, film and television. She is perhaps best known for her role as Kevin the Teenager's mum, Mrs Patterson, in the BBC TV series Harry Enfield & Chums and its spin-off film, Kevin and Perry Go Large. In 2012, she founded the Interior Design company Forbes Rix Design with her business partner Natalie Forbes.

== Early life ==
Rix was born in Kensington, London, to actors Brian Rix and Elspet Gray. She has two brothers, one of whom is children's author and TV producer Jamie Rix. Her sister Shelley was born with Down's Syndrome, and died in 2005.

Rix studied drama at LAMDA and acted for many years on TV and in the theatre.

== Career ==
Rix gained early theatre experience at the Nottingham Playhouse while Richard Eyre was the artistic director, and in Peter Cheeseman's company at Stoke-on-Trent. Her subsequent West End appearances included roles in How the Other Half Loves and Man of the Moment by Alan Ayckbourn; The Pocket Dream by Sandi Toksvig & Elly Brewer; and Whose Life is it Anyway? by Brian Clark, as well as several productions at the National Theatre.

Rix is known for playing Mrs Patterson, the mother of Kevin the teenager, in the TV series Harry Enfield and Chums and in the movie Kevin & Perry Go Large. For Granada Television she co-starred with Tim Bentinck in Made In Heaven. She played Mel Smith's girlfriend in two series of Colin's Sandwich and starred in two series of Side By Side, both for the BBC. In Brookside she performed with Anna Friel as the solicitor representing the Jordache family in the "body under the patio" storyline. She played the vocally-challenged night club singer Melody Lane in a feature-length Coronation Street special with the QEII as the location. One of her final acting roles was as the Home Secretary in The Execution of Gary Glitter.

== Personal life ==
In 1980, Rix married actor Jonathan Coy, with whom she has two children, including Jolyon Coy. Rix and Coy divorced in 1990. She married writer Richard Ommanney in 1994.

Her paternal aunt, Sheila Mercier, played Annie Sugden in Emmerdale Farm for more than twenty years.

Rix is a long-standing member of the House Committee at Denville Hall.

== Filmography ==
Year	Title	Role	Notes
1977	A Roof Over My Head	Maureen	Series 1, Episodes 1, 3 & 9 (recurring)
1978	Breakaway Girls	Sally Wharton	Series 1, Episode 4 (guest)
1978	Coronation Street	Carole Gordon	Episodes 1853, 1854, 1855 & 1856 (guest)
1979	Danger UXB	Angie	Series 1, Episodes 2 & 3 (guest)
1979	Kids	Jenny Bramley	Series 1, Episode 9 (guest)
1980	The Professionals	Judy Shaw	Series 4, Episode 13 (guest)
1981	Goodbye Darling	Beth	Series 1, Episode 5 (guest)
1981	A Fine Romance	Ann	Series 1, Episode 6 (guest)
1983	Agatha Christie's Partners in Crime	Mary Chilcott	Series 1, Episode 3 (guest)
1987	Alas Smith & Jones		Series 4, Episodes 2 & 3 (guest)
1988	French and Saunders	Woman in Shower	Series 2, Episode 2 (guest)
1988	Paris by Midnight	Nurse	Feature film
1988–89	Colin's Sandwich	Jenny Anderson	Series 1 & 2 (regular, 12 episodes)
1989	The Return of Shelley	Donna	Series 2, Episode 2 (guest)
1990	Made in Heaven	Helen Nicholson	Miniseries (regular, 4 episodes)
1991	Second Thoughts	Hilary	Series 1, Episode 4 (guest)
1991	Boon	Diana Fawley	Series 6, Episode 3 (guest)
1992–93	Side by Side	Gilly Bell	Series 1 & 2 (regular, 13 episodes)
1993	Harry	Margaret Clarke	Series 1, Episodes 11 & 12 (guest)
1994	The Detectives	Mrs. Sharpe	Series 2, Episode 6 (guest)
1994	Brookside	Alison Dicks	Episodes 1597 & 1600 (guest)
1994–97	Harry Enfield and Chums	Mum	Series 1 & 2 (supporting, 13 episodes)
1995	Coronation Street: The Feature Length Special	Melody Lane	Video
1997	Paul Merton in Galton and Simpson's...	Wife	Series 2, Episode 4 (guest)
1999	Harry Enfield Presents Kevin's Guide to Being a Teenager	Mum	Video
2000	Kevin & Perry Go Large	Mum	Feature film
2000	Always and Everyone	Belinda	Series 2, Episode 9 (guest)
2009	Doctors	Cynthia Robertson	Series 11, Episode 70 (guest)
2009	The Execution of Gary Glitter	Valerie Clarke	TV movie
2010	Miranda	Jennifer	Series 2, Episode 6 (guest)
2010	Come Fly with Me	Posh Lady	Series 1, Episode 2 (guest)
