= Adrian "Fletch" Fletcher =

Fictional character from the BBC medical dramas Casualty and Holby City

- Casualty and Holby City character
- Alex Walkinshaw as Adrian "Fletch" Fletcher
- First appearance: "Zero Sum Game"; 7 July 2012 (Casualty); "Star Crossed Lovers"; 12 August 2014 (Holby City)
- Last appearance: Episode 1102; 29 March 2022 (Holby City); "Judgement Call"; 2 April 2022 (Casualty)
- Portrayed by: Alex Walkinshaw; Aaron Mullen (flashback)
- Spinoff(s): "Mistletoe and Rum" (2012)

In-universe information
- Occupation: Staff nurse; (prev. Director of nursing, acting chief executive officer, ward manager, senior staff nurse)
- Family: Steven Fletcher (father)
- Spouse: Natalie Fletcher (until 2015)
- Significant others: Colette Sheward; Tess Bateman; Jac Naylor; Abigail Tait; Ange Godard; Jeni Sinclair
- Children: Evie Fletcher; Mikey Fletcher; Ella Fletcher; Theo Fletcher

Adrian "Fletch" Fletcher is a fictional character from the BBC medical dramas Casualty and Holby City, portrayed by Alex Walkinshaw. He appears in Casualty from its twenty-sixth series in 2012 until its twenty-eighth in 2014, before joining Holby City in its sixteenth series. Fletch is characterised as a fun, likeable and charming Jack the lad who considers his family very important. The character is introduced as a staff nurse in Holby City Hospital's emergency department (ED) and progresses in his career to the hospital's Director of Nursing. Fletch's personable characterisation has helped establish friendship with many characters, notably with Lloyd Asike (Michael Obiora) and Raf di Lucca (Joe McFadden). Fletch's main story in Casualty is his affair with senior nurse Tess Bateman (Suzanne Packer), which leads to the breakdown of his marriage to Natalie Fletcher (Claire Cage). The plot was explored in the online episode "Mistletoe and Rum" and contributed to his exit.

Upon joining Holby City, writers connected Fletch and Colette Sheward (Louise Delamere) through their backstory. Fletch's first major story began in 2015 when he becomes a single father following Natalie's death and struggles financially, briefly becoming involved in criminal activity. An appearance in Casualty for its thirtieth anniversary episode sparks another story for Fletch as he becomes temporarily paralysed after a stabbing. Producers then paired Fletch with Jac Naylor (Rosie Marcel) for a relationship, before establishing a long-running friendship between them. Further exploration of the character's background began in 2018 when his father, Steven Fletcher (Jesse Birdsall), is introduced. His next relationship was developed with consultant Ange Godard (Dawn Steele), which was challenged.

Fletch became the focus of an issue-based story in 2020 when he is diagnosed and treated for prostate cancer. The plot was played in conjunction with Essie Harrison's (Kaye Wragg) cancer story to highlight the statistical realism of cancer. His next story portrays him as a protective father when his daughter, Evie Fletcher (Phoebe French), becomes involved with Andrei Tarpov (Sonny Poon Tip) and Kian Madani (Ramin Karimloo). The character continued to be written into dramatic stories as Evie becomes sexually exploited by Fletch's new love interest, Jeni Sinclair (Debra Stephenson). Other stories for the character include a gambling addiction, clashing with Sydney Somers (Gemma Oaten) after receiving her father's inheritance, a move to management including a stint as acting chief executive officer (CEO), and a relationship with Abigail Tait (Olivia Poulet).

Holby City was cancelled in 2022, so the show's story team devised appropriate endings for their characters. Fletch's final stories feature him becoming disillusioned with the hospital and supporting Jac through her terminal illness. The character has generally been well received by television critics. Walkinshaw also spoke frequently of the positive reception he received from fans. In particular, Fletch's relationship with Jac and his cancer story was highly praised. Sue Haasler from the Metro opined that as Fletch, Walkinshaw is "a marvellous asset [...] to the Holby cast". For his portrayal of Fletch, Walkinshaw has been shortlisted twice for Best Drama Star at the Inside Soap Awards.

== Casting ==
On 13 March 2012, it was announced that actor Alex Walkinshaw had joined the regular cast as nurse Adrian "Fletch" Fletcher. Walkinshaw began filming in March, which he looked forward to. Executive producer Johnathan Young expressed his joy at Walkinshaw's casting and commented, "He's brings bags of talent, a wealth of experience and a cheeky sense of humour to rival Fletch's!" Before joining Casualty, Walkinshaw starred as Dale Smith in crime drama The Bill, which also featured several Casualty cast members. Walkinshaw found this reassuring as he could rely on these people if he struggled with anything.

Three actors, who were deemed suited to the part, were invited to audition for the role of Fletch. After speaking to some of the show's crew and performing a screen test, Walkinshaw was cast as Fletch. Walkinshaw was attracted to the role of Fletch because he differs from the roles that Walkinshaw has previously played. He liked the role of Fletch and his journey within the series. Walkinshaw enjoyed filming in Cardiff, where the drama is filmed. He signed a year-long contract.

In 2017, Walkinshaw expressed his enjoyment at portraying Fletch and said that he did not want to leave the role. He commented, "I'd stay till all my hair falls out and I have a Zimmer frame." The actor added that he never wanted to not enjoy portraying the character and suggested he could quit when he decides that he does not enjoy it any more. Young actor Aaron Mullen portrays Fletch in a flashback appearance during the twentieth series episode "Best Christmas Ever".

== Development ==
=== Characterisation and family ===
Fletch is the ultimate cheeky chappy – the kind of entertaining bloke you'd really want to go down the pub and have a laugh with, whether you're male or female. Although Fletch accepts he's starting at the bottom at Holby, he brings a lot of life experience to the job and has an air of authority and maturity. While he's prepared to take orders from those younger than him and knows he has lots still to learn in terms of practical experience, he isn't afraid to talk back or question something he disagrees with.

— An excerpt from Fletch's profile on the official Casualty website.

Fletch is billed as "the ultimate cheeky chappy" who enjoys sport, drinking alcohol and women. Fletch is nice, fun, charming and flirtatious. His likeable personality makes him popular amongst staff and patients alike. Walkinshaw described Fletch as "quite a nice, rounded bloke who's very happy to be around". He told Patrick McLennan of What's on TV that Fletch is a "wheeler-dealer" with the easy ability to talk to people, making him popular. On the character, series producer Nikki Wilson commented, "You'll see a real charm, energy and playfulness from his character, which is absolutely joyous." Young's executive producer successor, Oliver Kent, said that Fletch has a "unique blend of warmth and blokiness". Walkinshaw described his character as "a laugh and a bit of a jack the lad". Jonathan Phillips, one of the show's story producers, called Fletch an "alpha male, laddish" character. A What's on TV reporter described Fletch as a "cheeky graduate" who is "super confident". Walkinshaw liked Fletch's characterisation, specifically his "cheeky chappy" persona and his occupation. He thought that Fletch would be a character that the audience could relate to. He felt that he and Fletch were similar and revelled in the opportunity to portray a friendly character. In a later interview, Walkinshaw said that he was a more serious person than Fletch as his character is very "high-energy, always moving" and he had to be more serious at home. Wilson loved the character, calling him "brilliant". Walkinshaw was handed a description of his character when he joined the series which he and producers developed after he began filming. He liked the working relationship between himself and show bosses when it came to developing the character. When filming, Walkinshaw will try to stay as his character's personality to avoid having to regain his character repeatedly. While he described this technique as "exhausting", he believed that regaining his character multiple times over the course of filming would be more tiring.

External videos
- "Adrian Fletcher: Character trailer" Fletch's Casualty character trailer

Fletch is a staff nurse at Holby City Hospital's emergency department (ED), a job which he enjoys since he likes learning new skills and meeting new people. Walkinshaw thought that Fletch suited his job. Fletch wants to bring some light-hearted fun to the ED team. Fletch likes working in the hospital because it reminds him of happy memories and his family. Walkinshaw explained that although Fletch is new to the nursing profession, he has plenty of life experience, which helps him in the job. He described Fletch as "a very competent nurse" and a fantastic addition to the team of ED staff. He told a BBC Online reporter that Fletch has the "maturity" not commonly associated with recently qualified nurses. Wilson pointed out that Fletch adds "a real sense of humour" to the ED's nursing staff. Walkinshaw explained that Fletch pushes people's limits with his humour. Lisa Spencer-Blackshaw, the senior nursing advisor at Holby City, said that Fletch resembles most male nurses and opined that he is a great nurse.

Fletch does not struggle when dealing with nervous and stressed patients. He will always go "the extra mile" for his patients and is described as "your go-to if you need straight-talking advice". Walkinshaw told Sue Haasler, writing for the book Holby City: Behind the Screen, that Fletch is the "glue between people" and said that he would emotionally support others as he felt it was as important as treating patients. He believed that Fletch's personal problems provide him with "emotional authority". Walkinshaw said that he struggled with the medical terminology as he is not medically capable. He practised bandaging with his children at home. He told Laura-Jayne Tyler of Inside Soap that he preferred wearing Fletch's nursing scrubs to the police uniform that he wore on The Bill. Walkinshaw believed that while he would be good at the bedside manner nurses use, he would struggle with the practical side of the job. Fletch is promoted to senior staff nurse in July 2013 and is a ward manager when he joins Holby City. A BBC Online reporter stated that Fletch's "executive title" does not prevent him from "getting his hands dirty and managing from the front line". Fletch is a good manager and is able to "work miracles on a dwindling budget". As an approachable person, Fletch knows everything about the nurses on his team.

Despite his fondness of women, Fletch is loyal towards his wife Natalie Fletcher (Claire Cage), who was originally named Keila, and their three children, Evie, Mikey and Ella. Walkinshaw thought Fletch's loyalty made him "all the more attractive". He explained that Fletch enjoys flirting but also enjoys returning home to his family so would not want to betray them. Walkinshaw told Daniel Kilkelly of entertainment website Digital Spy in June 2012 that he wanted Fletch's family to be introduced on-screen. He added that he believed they would make an appearance on the show. When he joins Holby City, Fletch is billed as "a proud and protective single dad to four beautifully demanding kids". Walkinshaw told What's on TV reporter Victoria Wilson that Fletch's children are his "happy place" and they mean "absolutely everything" to him. He explained that Fletch's children give him the confidence to do what needs to be done. He added that while Fletch's decision are not always the best, they are done for good reason.

=== Backstory and introduction ===
"Yeah, that's the reason he went into nursing. He was a mechanic beforehand, but he saw what was on offer as a nurse when his daughter was born. He was half-way there already with his people skills, so he just thought, 'I used to fix cars, so why can't I fix people?'"

— Walkinshaw on Fletch's reasons for becoming a nurse. (2012)

Fletch's backstory states that he was a car mechanic running his own business until the Great Recession, when he was forced to close his garage. At the time, Fletch and Natalie were expecting their third child and needed financial support. After being supported by the nursing staff in the ED while his daughter was born at the hospital, Fletch decided that he would join the nursing profession. The show spoke to the Royal College of Nursing, who told them that many people decide to become ED nurses in later life. A BBC Online contributor dubbed Fletch "a little older than your average band 5 nurse".

Fletch makes his first appearance in the twenty-sixth series episode "Zero Sum Game", broadcast on 7 July 2012. His first scenes were previewed in a promotional trailer for episodes 31-42, released on 12 April 2012. When Fletch arrives, staff nurse Lloyd Asike (Michael Obiora) is assigned to be his mentor. Fletch misses his induction with Lloyd because he is fixing clinical nurse manager Tess Bateman's (Suzanne Packer) car. Lloyd is shocked when he meets Fletch as he is expecting a young nurse who will be "slightly more impressionable". Fletch's confidence surprises Lloyd, who becomes wary of Fletch.

Fletch and Lloyd treat Amy Harris (Nikki Sanderson), a young woman who is suspected to be pregnant. Walkinshaw explained that Fletch views Amy as a child and wants to be "supportive". It emerges that she is not pregnant and Fletch has to tell her some bad news, which he does not like doing. On this, Walkinshaw commented, "He finds that really hard and that's something he's going to have to learn how to cope with." This experience helps Fletch understand that he cannot become emotionally involved in patient lives. Walkinshaw did not want to watch his first episode live as he struggles with nerves and was worried about the audience reaction. Wilson confirmed that Fletch's introduction would build towards a bigger focus on the ED's nursing staff during series 27.

=== Friendships ===
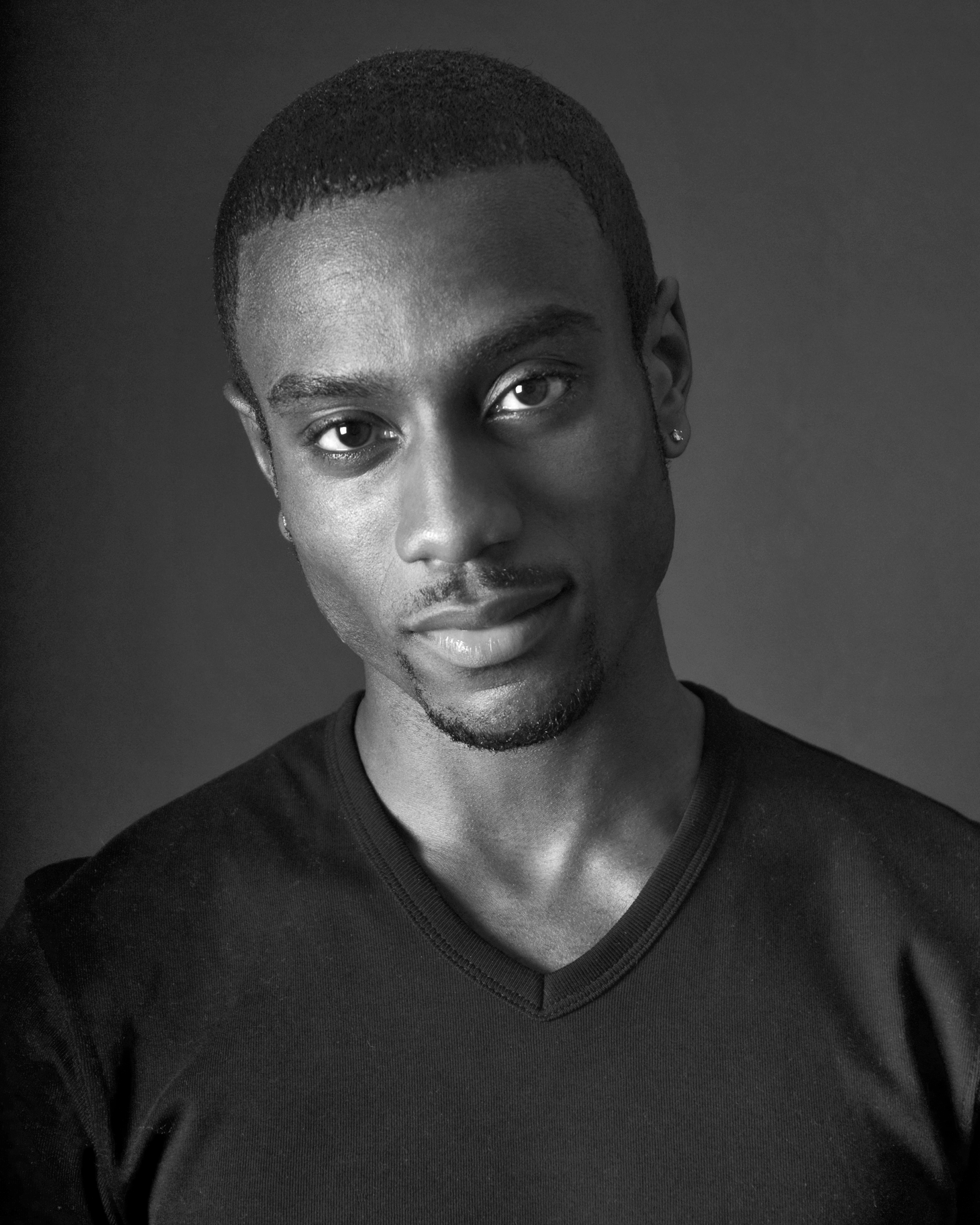
Michael Obiora (pictured) portrays Fletch's mentor, Lloyd Asike.

Fletch gets along well with his colleagues, who like his fun personality. However, he clashes with mentor Lloyd. Fletch realises how humourless Lloyd is, so decides to tease him. Walkinshaw explained that Fletch's actions are not out of spite and that Fletch wants to "get past the seriousness of Lloyd". He predicted that Fletch and Lloyd would eventually become friends. When talking to his colleagues, Fletch does not differentiate between them and is not concerned about their level of authority. However, when he is working in resus, Fletch always respects the fact that the consultants are in control of the situation. Walkinshaw commented that when Fletch is in regular surroundings, "he's not worried whether you're the boss or not." Fletch will speak to everyone in the same way because he finds that it is "a good leveller". Fletch discovers that consultant Zoe Hanna (Sunetra Sarker) is single and questions her about it. On this, Walkinshaw explained that Fletch is only having a laugh with Zoe and is not prying for information.

Walkinshaw expected Fletch to develop friendships with the characters on Holby City. He told Katy Moon of Inside Soap that Fletch would get along with all of his colleagues, similarly to his time on Casualty, as they enjoy his personality. Jaye Jacobs reprised her role as nurse Donna Jackson in June 2017 and clashes with Fletch upon her return. Jacobs and Walkinshaw previously worked together as an onscreen couple in Waterloo Road, so she dismissed any chance of romance between the pair. Before Donna left, she was the AAU's ward sister, a role which Fletch now holds. Donna struggles to be told what to do by Fletch and wants to "pick up where she left off". Jacobs explained that Donna "tramples on a few toes" as she returns. Donna returns while the hospital staff are grieving following the death of doctor Jasmine Burrows (Lucinda Dryzek). She returns with an energy that annoys Fletch; Jacobs told Sarah Deen of the Metro that Donna's energy is "slightly misplaced" and that she enjoyed portraying the tension between Fletch and Donna. However, the pair eventually establish a friendship after Donna opens up to Fletch about her personal life.

=== Affair with Tess Bateman ===
Ahead of his introduction, Walkinshaw said that Fletch and Tess would become friends when Tess becomes drawn to Fletch's humorous personality and his ability to create laughter in the ED. David Butcher of the Radio Times pointed out that Tess responds differently to Fletch than other people. He stated that when Fletch winks at Tess, she smiles at him rather than "[responding] with a basilisk stare and stern lecture". Producers devised a new storyline for Fletch and Tess when their friendship turns into an affair. Walkinshaw thought the storyline was natural and described it as an "honest, slow-burning development". The actor revealed that the storyline would feature "a lot of pain and struggle for Fletch and Tess." Off-screen, Walkinshaw and Packer are friends and discuss their intimate scenes beforehand. He did not mind portraying them. In the months after Fletch's introduction, there is a display of "chemistry" between the two characters.

Fletch and Tess' relationship is explored in a special episode, entitled "Mistletoe and Rum", made available to watch on BBC Red Button on 15 December 2012. The special follows Fletch and Tess on the ED nurses' Christmas night out. However, their evening is disrupted when they discover Tyron, a homeless man who needs emergency treatment when he goes into a hypoglycaemic coma, and have to treat him. Young thought that the special episode would create "an ideal opportunity" to explore Fletch and Tess' relationship before it began in the following months. Cast member Sarker directed the special, which she described as "a treat for all the fans that follow the show".

Gemma-Leah Devereux joined the cast as "self-assured" student nurse Aoife O'Reilly in January 2013. Fletch is assigned to be Aoife's mentor and she soon develops romantic feelings for him. Fletch does not realise this so Tess tries to warn him, but he brushes off her concerns and insists that he is "a father figure" to Aoife. Tess does not approve of Fletch's behaviour around Aoife, who she deems "an impressionable nurse". Fletch realises the truth when Aoife leaves him a Valentine card and after speaking to Aoife about her actions, Fletch is forced to "endure a tense shift with an embarrassed Aoife and watchful Tess." When Tess discovers that Fletch has spoken to Aoife, she agrees to go for a drink with him and at the end of the night, Fletch and Tess kiss. A What's on TV journalist wondered whether this would spark the start of an affair for the characters.

"They bring out the good things in each other, there's a lot of respect between them. Tess has authority at the hospital, she runs the ship. Fletch's strength is that he brings out the relaxed, easy-going side of her."

— Walkinshaw on Fletch and Tess' feelings for each other. (2013)

After Tess becomes involved in a stabbing incident, she is followed home and physically threatened. Fletch predicts what may happen and goes to Tess' home, where he finds her "scared and emotional". Walkinshaw explained that at that point, Fletch and Tess realise that they have "strong feelings for each other". Fletch and Tess then have sex. Walkinshaw pointed out that it has taken the couple some time to reach this point. As part of the storyline, Fletch's home life is explored. Walkinshaw felt that this was vital for the story as it gives the audience "a clearer picture". He explained that Fletch adores his children and does not want to lose that relationship, but his relationship with Natalie is changing. Tess later discovers that she is pregnant with Fletch's child and tries to tell him before goes on holiday with his family. As she prepares to tell him in her office, Natalie arrives with his children so Tess does not get a chance to speak with him. Walkinshaw stated that the story has several "interesting twists and turns". He added that he was enjoying the story because it pairs two characters that are not expected to be paired.

Tess does not tell Fletch about her pregnancy and terminates it. She avoids Fletch, but when they eventually speak, Tess ends their relationship. Zoe later realises that they have been in a relationship after noticing the tension between them at work. The following week, Natalie arrives in the ED to see Fletch but is admitted after fainting. Tess treats Natalie and discovers that she is pregnant. After Tess is admitted to the ED, Fletch discovers that she had a termination and is upset. Fletch tells Tess that he loves her, but she replies that she does not feel the same, devastating him. Afterward, Fletch decides to focus on his marriage.

=== Allegations ===
Writers created another story for Fletch when he takes the blame for Tess' medical mistake. When Tess discovers that Natalie is pregnant, she becomes "distracted" at work. She treats another patient, Peter Trenton (Graham Turner), but administers the wrong drug, leaving him "[fighting] for his life". Tess goes home, unaware of her mistake, and Fletch covers for her by replacing her initials on the notes with his. Tess is surprised to discover that Fletch made the error and he confesses that he covered for her because he blames himself for her distraction. Following the error, Fletch faces a tribunal and Tess struggles to cope, "distraught" that her actions could mean that Fletch loses his job. At the end of his shift, Fletch discovers that he has only been cautioned by the HR department.

Two months later, Peter returns to the department after being admitted again. Fletch believes that Peter is being abused by his partner, Matt Marston (John McAndrew), who becomes "defensive" and accuses Fletch of attacking Peter when he was previously in hospital. Fletch admits that they spoke outside the hospital where Peter fell over, but he did not attack Peter. Matt calls the police and they arrest Fletch after reviewing the CCTV footage of their argument. The police charge Fletch with assault. On New Year's Eve, Fletch witnesses an explosion at a bar where Peter is inside and enters the burning building to save him. Paramedic Jeff Collier (Matt Bardock) helps Fletch and Peter and they escape the bar. Thankful to Fletch for saving his life, Peter drops all charges against him.

=== Breakdown of marriage ===
Writers decided to focus on Fletch and Natalie's marriage by having her discover his affair. She arrives at the ED when Fletch has to stay for an extra shift, suspecting Fletch of having an affair. Fletch reassures Natalie that they have a strong marriage, but he eventually reveals that he had an affair with a colleague, but claims that it was with a nurse who has left the hospital. Walkinshaw thought that Natalie would "absolutely devastated" if she discovered that Fletch had an affair with Tess. Natalie ejects Fletch from the family home and later warns him away from the family so he explains to his "heartbroken" children that he will not spend Christmas with them. Walkinshaw had previously teased the scenes in an interview with Inside Soap, describing them as "heartbreaking" and "very emotional". He revealed that the scenes had "stayed with [him] for days afterwards". The actor added that he had "an inkling" about what the scenes would involve, but it became apparent that they were harder to film that he first thought. Walkinshaw has named the scenes as his hardest scenes to film on multiple occasions, stating that since he has children himself, he felt that it had a big impact on him. After saying goodbye to his children, Fletch is "overcome with regret and remorse". A What's on TV journalist pointed out that Fletch believes that "he's pretty certain life can't get any worse".

Fletch plans to take his children out for the day and is annoyed when Natalie cancels the plans and argues with her. Walkinshaw noted that Fletch and Natalie's separation is having a strain on the children's lives, making them "upset and disjointed by it". The argument causes their daughter Evie Fletcher (Sarah Staniforth) to run away, causing "blind panic at her disappearance". Fletch goes in search of Evie and finds her in an abandoned house. When he enters the house, the ceiling collapses and Evie becomes injured and stuck. Walkinshaw enjoyed filming the on-location scenes as he liked the "smash and grab" environment in comparison to the calmer scenes in the hospital. He also liked the challenge of filming stunts as "big lumps of things are falling through ceilings". When he left Casualty, Walkinshaw said that he enjoyed this stunt as it "looked and sounded great".

While Natalie is en route to the ED, she is involved in a car crash which creates worry for her unborn child. The crash makes Fletch realise that he should focus on his family and that he should not have had an affair. He and Natalie then decide to rebuild their marriage. Walkinshaw explained, "The tragedy of potentially losing two of their children forces Fletch and Natalie to make some big decisions." Natalie decides to rebuild their marriage with support from Tess and asks Fletch to move back into the family home. Walkinshaw stated that this is "obviously very difficult" for Tess due to her feelings for Fletch. With Tess having helped the marriage, Walkinshaw thought that Natalie would feel "really hurt and betrayed" if she discovered the truth because Tess has "lied to her by backing up Fletch's story." Natalie is later admitted to the ED in labour and Tess is forced to deliver the baby. Afterward, there are complications with the baby and Zoe has to resuscitate him.

=== Gambling addiction ===
Fletch became the subject of a gambling addiction storyline in April 2014. The storyline begins when Fletch begins having "playful bets" with registrar Caleb Knight (Richard Winsor), but he later starts online gambling. Cal then suggests to Fletch that he tries spread betting on the stock exchange, which requires a £500 starting stake. Walkinshaw explained that Fletch "doesn't really think it all the way through" so is happy to accept Cal's invitation to spread betting, despite it being too expensive for him. However, Fletch realises what he has done when he loses his money, which is one month's mortgage payment. Walkinshaw said that Fletch "finds himself into a bit of a pickle!" He explained, "Rather than stopping, Fletch thinks he can get out of this by spending more money. But he digs himself a deeper and deeper hole!" Walkinshaw teased that the storyline would not end well for Fletch. Fletch tries to earn his money back by working extra shifts at the ED, which makes him "exhausted". When Tess realises, she warns him and says he is not allowed any more overtime. Fletch then accepts a second job as a taxi driver. Walkinshaw said that Fletch has to find the lost money which leaves him under strain. He added, "He makes things difficult for himself and lots of other things happen." Tess becomes suspicious of Fletch and he admits that he has a second job, leaving Tess "unimpressed".

=== Departure ===
On 1 April 2014, it was announced that Fletch would be leaving Casualty to join its spin-off series, Holby City. Walkinshaw stated that Fletch leaves for a new challenge after his affair with Tess is revisited. He revealed that what happens with the story means that Fletch has to leave. The executive producer of both shows, Oliver Kent, said that Fletch and Walkinshaw had been "a wonderful asset to Casualty" and he was looking forward to him joining Holby City. Walkinshaw decided to leave Casualty to be closer to his family after two years on the show. When he informed the producers, they asked him to join Holby City. He was sad to leave the show and said he would miss his colleagues, who he hoped to stay in touch with. Reflecting on his character's storylines, Walkinshaw said that he enjoyed portraying the lighter material, but also liked the "agonising" material. He added that he was happy to have filmed so many stunt scenes as nurse characters rarely leave the setting of the show.

Fletch's exits in the series twenty-eight episode "Falling – Part Two", broadcast on 29 June 2014. In the episode, Tess is involved in a train crash. The train crash serves as a catalyst for Fletch's departure from the series. Phillips, who produced the episode, wanted to place Fletch and Tess' relationship at the center of the episode. He decided to create "a sense of what is at stake" for the characters. The crew struggled to find a location suitable for the train crash as many organisations did not want the show to derail trains and "blow them up" on their railways. They visited multiple locations, but most of them were not suitable for various reasons, ranging from its size to the logistics of filming there. On the stunt, Phillips said, "It's on an epic scale with a lot of different railway lines and we can hopefully create a real spectacle." The stunt was filmed at night over several days. Walkinshaw enjoyed filming on location and film something as grand as the train crash. Phillips told a BBC Online reporter that the crew faced multiple challenges with the episode, including making sure that the script "really held water and did justice to the story that we really want to tell." He added that once the crew realised how they would produce the episode, they became excited about filming it. Reflecting on filming the train crash, Walkinshaw commented, "The train crash is big, with weird and wonderful stuff – it was good fun."

"I think for all the fantastic special effects we're going to be doing – the explosion, the derailment – the thing that the audience will take with them is the key image of these two characters reconnecting in a very dramatic context."

— Producer Jonathan Phillips on the reunion of Fletch and Tess during the crash. (2014)

When Fletch discovers the news, he joins the paramedics and rushes to the scene of the incident. Walkinshaw explained that Fletch "goes into panic" when he discovers that Tess in on the derailed train. He realises that he has been ignoring his romantic feelings for Tess. The train explodes as Fletch is rescuing Tess, but they appear through the smoke of the explosion. Phillips thought the image was powerful and believed the audience would remember it. While Fletch is saving Tess from the train, Natalie is watching the events on a news report in the ED. She soon realises that Tess is the woman that Fletch had an affair with. Walkinshaw pointed out that in Fletch's final scenes, he faces multiple "realisations" and "conclusions". He has to make a choice about Natalie and Tess, and ends his marriage to Natalie. Walkinshaw opined that Fletch "does the right thing" and said that he and Tess would not be able to pretend to be "'just' friends". He said in an interview for the Casualty website that Fletch is "brave, stupid [and] romantic" and commented, "He loves Natalie for everything she's given him: the support, the family, the love, but his heart is with Tess."

In an emotional conversation with Tess, he tells her that he wants them to be together, although she says that she can't be with him. Walkinshaw described the scene as "emotional" and said, "filming the emotional scenes with Suzanne I found quite easy to do as she's a great actress." Fletch decides to resign from his job in the ED as a result. Walkinshaw that Fletch makes his decision "gallantly" and said that he does "the right thing". He did not believe his character's affair had made him a bad person as he had just acted on his feelings. He thought that Fletch deciding to leave was a selfless act because he had put Tess' feelings before his own. Walkinshaw told Elaine Reilly of What's on TV that Fletch's colleagues would "draw their own conclusions" from Fletch's decision to leave. He pointed out that Fletch has maintained a good relationship with his colleagues. Reflecting on the storyline and Fletch's departure, Phillips commented, "what we want to do is take the audience on a real journey with Fletch and Tess and see those characters forced to face their destinies together". Series producer Erika Hossington told Kilkelly (Digital Spy) that she wanted Fletch and Tess to be involved in the train crash, which she regarded as a "big set piece", because she wanted to involve characters that the audience enjoy in the stunts.

Reflecting on his tenure on the show, Walkinshaw said that he could find a highlight in every day of his work and described the show as "a lovely place to be and work". He also praised his storylines and the people he's worked with, adding that he would miss the friendships he has made. He added that he liked portraying both the lighter, comedic material and the dramatic, emotional material. The actor was also appreciative for the stunts that Fletch was involved in as he understood that nurses do not usually feature outside the ED set. Phillips was disappointed that Fletch would not continue his story on Casualty, but he expected to feel the repercussions of the storyline on the show. Hossington revealed that Fletch's storyline would set up stories for Tess as she deals with the aftermath of her affair with Fletch.

=== Holby City introduction ===
Producers wanted to introduce a new male nurse that could work with Jonny Maconie (Michael Thomson) and "lock horns" with director of nursing Colette Sheward (Louise Delamere). When Walkinshaw told Kent about his intentions to leave in August 2013, he and Simon Harper, the series producer of Holby City, made plans for Fletch to join the spinoff series. Kent explained that this very rarely happens and when it does, they do not normally move to the other show immediately. However, he thought that Fletch was "unique" in how there was a small gap between leaving Casualty and joining Holby City. Harper thought that moving Fletch to Holby City would be risky due to his association with Casualty. Despite this, he felt that Walkinshaw brought "cheek and charm" to the show, which he liked. Walkinshaw was surprised by the plans to move his character, but said he was "very grateful for it" as it meant he could go home each night. On this, he commented, "There's a lot to be said for that." Walkinshaw did not know many cast members before joining the show, but did know Rosie Marcel, who portrays Jac Naylor, well as they worked closely together on The Bill. Writers devised a scene between Walkinshaw and Marcel where they reference their history on The Bill. Marcel felt "lucky" to be allowed to have a scene and described the scene as "really funny". She was pleased that Walkinshaw had joined the cast as she had tried to get him to join for several years and expected him to attract a new audience for the show. When Walkinshaw told Marcel that he would be joining, she joked that she would "make [his] life hell!" A preview of upcoming episodes, including Fletch's introduction, was released on 15 July 2014.

With the announcement that Fletch would join Holby City, Walkinshaw stated that after leaving his job in the ED, Fletch is offered a new job in the hospital. He is offered the position of the ward manager of the Acute Assessment Unit (AAU) after Raf di Lucca (Joe McFadden) complains to Colette about a lack of nurses. CEO Guy Self (John Michie) takes over the decision and hires Fletch without telling Colette. Kent and Harper agreed that Fletch's introduction allows for the AAU to become "fun again". Fletch's new job is a promotion. Walkinshaw said that Fletch would try to be successful and "assert himself a bit more" as he becomes more mature. He added that Fletch would take on the responsibility as a challenge, but said that he could "mess up" like he did on Casualty. Walkinshaw did not expect Fletch's gambling storyline to be continued in Holby City. He also pointed out that Fletch is not in a relationship so could have a love interest. When asked about Fletch's upcoming storylines, Walkinshaw teased stories with Colette, Raf, Harry Tressler (Jules Knight) and Serena Campbell (Catherine Russell).

Since both shows are set in the same hospital, it is expected that characters may know each other. Therefore, Fletch's new colleagues know about his affair with Tess. His superiors, Guy and AAU consultant Ric Griffin (Hugh Quarshie) warn Fletch not to mix his personal and professional lives in his new job. Walkinshaw explained that Fletch expected people to doubt him in his new job and is prepared to "rise to the challenge and move on". Ric already knows Tess, which makes him more cautious of Fletch. Walkinshaw said that when he joins the AAU, "Fletch's card is well and truly marked." However, Ric becomes impressed with Fletch when he performs a difficult procedure.

Fletch tries to prove himself by hiring an agency nurse to help with the workload. Helen Flanagan was cast as Kirsty Brompton, a "lazy and wily" agency nurse who Fletch hires after meeting her in a bar. Kent stated that Flanagan's appearance would be "an episode to watch" and that Kirsty would "ruffle some feathers" with Colette. Colette disagrees with Fletch's decision to hire Kirsty, believing that he has hired her based on her appearance rather than her skills. When the AAU becomes understaffed, Fletch tries to hide this and sort the ward single-handedly, but Colette soon realises the truth.

=== Colette Sheward ===
Writers established a link between Fletch and Colette when it emerges that they were engaged fifteen years previously, but she jilted him on their wedding day. Delamere explained that Colette jilted Fletch because she wanted to explore other things before settling down. The pair have "unresolved issues" which make Fletch's new job difficult. Delamere explained that Fletch would be "an unwelcome blast from the past who gets under Colette's skin!", while Walkinshaw teased that Fletch would have to decide how to create a working relationship with Colette. Guy hires Fletch to annoy Colette, which Fletch fails to realise. Delamere thought that Guy's actions were cruel for Colette. Colette realises Guy's intentions and reacts badly to Fletch's arrival. Fletch hopes for a "fresh start" when he arrives, but struggles with this when he is confronted with Colette. Their meeting is the first time that they have seen each other since Colette jilted Fletch on their wedding day. Walkinshaw told Wilson (What's on TV) that although Fletch and Colette need to have a talk about that day, Fletch wants to get on with his job. He also said that "it's a bit of a shock to both of them" to see each other and there is clear tension between the pair. The actor explained that Fletch decides to deal with his past with Colette and develop a better working relationship with her, but encounters a lot of "bickering and banter". Walkinshaw enjoyed the fun scenes between Fletch and Colette where they argue.

A romantic attraction is developed between Fletch and Colette. Walkinshaw told Kilkelly of Digital Spy that there is an element of "what if?" between Fletch and Colette. Delamere thought there was "great chemistry" between the pair, but understood that Colette needed to be professional. Despite this, the actress opined that Colette should have married Fletch. Colette departed the series in November 2014, ending any potential relationship between Fletch and Colette. Delamere enjoyed working with Walkinshaw and believed that had Fletch and Colette began a relationship, Colette would have "ended up eating him alive if she'd wanted to!"

=== Raf di Lucca ===
Producers developed a friendship between Fletch and registrar Raf di Lucca (McFadden) when he joins Holby City. Moon (Inside Soap) reported that Fletch and Raf would become "firm friends". Walkinshaw told her that they would work well together and support each other. McFadden also confirmed that Fletch would become friends with Raf and said that during Raf's difficult moments, Fletch becomes "a guiding light for him". When Raf confides in Fletch about his marital problems, Fletch agrees to help Raf. He assigns him to a complex case and encourages Raf to focus on his career. McFadden enjoyed working with Walkinshaw and opined that he was enjoyable to spend time with. Reflecting on Fletch and Raf's friendship, Walkinshaw pointed out that Fletch has made Raf more light-hearted, while Raf has matured Fletch.

Fletch and Raf's friendship is tested in May 2016 by the introduction of psychiatrist Naomi Palmer (Lorna Brown). Fletch tries to impress Naomi and decides to ask her on a date, presuming that Raf will babysit his children. Raf becomes irritated by Fletch's behaviour and feels that he is "being taken for granted". He reminds Fletch about his responsibilities at home and Fletch realises how much he needs Raf. Raf later develops an attraction to Naomi as Fletch decides to ask Naomi on a date. Naomi later dumps Fletch without warning after developing an attraction to Raf. Raf feels guilty and tries to hide his feelings for Naomi, although Fletch soon realises. He tells Raf that he will move out of his house, although he changes her mind when they reconcile.

McFadden left the series in 2017 and Raf was killed off in a hospital shooting in December. Fletch struggles to grieve for Raf following his death. A few weeks later, Fletch is sent Raf's record collection as part of his inheritance. A patient then suggests that Raf wants Fletch to complete and order the collection, which he continues to do.

=== Single fatherhood and poverty ===
Fletch's first major storyline in Holby City commenced in January 2015 when his and Natalie's divorce is finalised. Natalie celebrates her divorce with her friend Bex Kimber (Emma Cooke) and they arrive on the AAU, where Fletch is on shift, after Bex is admitted. Natalie reveals that she is moving to Sunderland with their children, having accepted a job there. Fletch is annoyed and speaks to Bex, who explains that Natalie is "deeply unhappy as a result of their marriage breakdown" and needs to start afresh. Fletch then realises how much his affair with Tess has affected Natalie and tells her that he will not stop her moving. Natalie falls unconscious and Raf realises that Natalie has serious bruising on her head. It emerges that Natalie has a bleed on the brain and needs emergency surgery; Fletch is left "in turmoil". Natalie dies as a result of her injuries, leaving Fletch a single father. The divorce left Fletch without any savings so when he becomes a single father, he is left with financial strain. Producers decided to kill off Natalie because it would create several new storylines for Fletch, including his struggle as a single father and his financial struggles, which were shown onscreen.

Evie Fletcher (Macey Chipping), Fletch's eldest daughter, was introduced in April 2015 as part of the storyline. As she joins a new school, Evie is involved in a bus crash and admitted onto the AAU. Fletch orders an MRI scan for Evie when she says that she has a headache, panicking that she could have a brain injury like Natalie. Fletch is then devastated when he discovers that Evie was not involved in the accident and that she was being bullied for being poor, so got off the bus early. Evie confesses that she did not want to worry Fletch, which makes him realise that Evie is aware of his financial struggles. A What's on TV reporter stated that Fletch "feels he's letting his children down". Later, Fletch has to pay for an expensive school trip for Evie amid multiple debts. Jane Hazlegrove, who portrays Kathleen "Dixie" Dixon in Casualty, appears in one episode as part of the storyline. When a patient suggests that Fletch bets on a horse, he asks Dixie to place the bet for him so he can pay for Evie's trip. Dixie is "reluctant" due to Fletch's gambling problem.

"With four kids and no savings it hasn't taken much for Fletch to find himself in a financial hole. As a proud man, he hasn't wanted to admit that he's struggling and he's been praying something will turn up."

— Walkinshaw on how Fletch has become financially unstable. (2015)

Fletch's debts increase when his car is clamped after parking illegally to help a patient. Fletch confesses his financial problems to porter Clifford George (Geff Francis), who becomes a friend for Fletch. Walkinshaw explained that Fletch relates to Clifford as he is a "bloke's bloke" and is trying to help Fletch. He added that Clifford has "no malice" towards Fletch. Clifford has the clamp removed and offers Fletch "a holdall of knocked-off cigarettes" for him to sell. Fletch is hesitant to accept, but does take Clifford's offer. However, Walkinshaw believed that these actions are "not really Fletch". Clifford continues to help Fletch with his problem and they store illegal whiskey in the hospital. They discover a young boy where they have stored the alcohol, and Serena nearly discovers their stash. Clifford later tells Fletch about a pharmaceutical drugs raid from a delivery van and claims that it is a "victimless crime", but Fletch is not interested. Walkinshaw explained that Fletch justifies the raid because Clifford has said that nobody would get hurt.

Writers included an "awful" and "really sad" twist to Fletch's financial storyline when he and his children are evicted from their home. On the twist, Walkinshaw commented, "Fletch is the sort of person who cheers everyone else up when the truth is that inside he's dying." He added that Fletch feels like he has failed his children. When Fletch arrives to work with his belongings, Clifford offers Fletch the chance of assisting in the raid. Walkinshaw said that Fletch is hesitant to get involved in the raid because he is "a decent, honest man" and the raid does not feel right to him. However, he pointed out that Fletch has no other choice but to get involved as he has to support his children. At the end of the day, Fletch and his children have to sleep in "makeshift beds" in the hospital basement. Victoria Wilson (What's on TV) opined that Fletch had "hit rock bottom". When Clifford explains to Fletch what he has to do, Fletch gets anxious and tries to end his involvement. Walkinshaw told Wilson that Fletch ends his involvement because he is uncomfortable with becoming a criminal. Clifford confesses how he owes money to "violent drug dealers" and he needs to repay them, before revealing that they know about Fletch and his children, placing their lives at danger. Fletch panics that his children are in danger, so agrees to help. However, when Fletch's patient deteriorates, he cannot attend the raid. Walkinshaw explained that Fletch "made the right call at the wrong time".

Shortly afterward, a woman is found "badly beaten" outside the hospital entrance and Fletch believes the two incidents are connected. On Fletch's reasons for this, Walkinshaw commented, "there's no such thing as a victimless crime; somebody always gets hurt, somebody always pays." A further twist to the story revealed that the beaten woman is healthcare assistant Adele Effanga (Petra Letang). Fletch is "racked with guilt" from the attack, knowing he is partly responsible for Adele's condition. He asks Clifford to anonymously tell the police the name of a gang member, but Clifford refuses, so Fletch warns Clifford to sort the situation or he will. Clifford then leaves the hospital without telling anyone. A What's on TV reporter said, "it's anyone's guess whether we'll see him again..." Realising what Clifford has done, Fletch confesses the truth to Adele's cousin Mo Effanga (Chizzy Akudolu), who warns that she go to the police if Fletch does not leave Holby in one month. Clifford later returns to the hospital when he is injured in a car accident and Mo does not force Fletch to leave. Fletch and his family are also invited to live with Raf when he discovers they are homeless. Walkinshaw explained that Raf has "taken a lot of weight off [Fletch's] shoulders" by inviting them to live with him. He observed, "It's not a conventional family unit, but it suits them both."

Fletch's single parenthood was explored again in August 2016 when Fletch's children, Evie and Mikey Fletcher (Kai O'Loughlin), appear in the series. Evie is admitted as a patient on the AAU and Mikey arrives shortly afterward. Fletch has to face Mikey's "problematic behaviour" and worries that "what taking his eye off the ball could mean for his family." It emerges that Mikey hurt Evie by pushing her down the stairs. As Evie prepares to be discharged, she tells Serena that she does not want to return home. Fletch also tells Serena that he blames himself for the accident so she reunites Fletch and Evie. Walkinshaw enjoyed working with Chipping and O'Loughlin. He described Chipping as "extraordinary" and "such a lovely actor", and O'Loughlin as "a little Fletch on a hot wash." Walkinshaw joked, "All we've got to do is grow that hair and tease that quiff and he's me." O'Loughlin lives very close to where Walkinshaw was raised and the three actors bonded immediately. The younger actors have conversations with Walkinshaw about trying different methods in their work, which Walkinshaw encourages. Walkinshaw explained that he made a big effort to create a connection between them. He called the actors "adorable" and a delight to work with, commenting, "If I could work with them all the time it would be lovely."

=== Casualty returns ===
After leaving Casualty, Walkinshaw said that he could return to the show for guest appearances or that characters from the show could appear in Holby City. The actor thought it would be good to appear in some episodes. Since his departure, Walkinshaw would go onto make multiple appearances as Fletch in Casualty. His first return to the series coincided with the show's thirtieth anniversary episode, "Too Old for This Shift". Walkinshaw's return was announced on 28 June 2016, alongside two other Holby City cast members. In the narrative, Fletch appears at a surprise party for senior nurse Charlie Fairhead (Derek Thompson), who is celebrating thirty years in the NHS.

Walkinshaw reprises his role in Casualty again during its thirty-third series for a two-part crossover episode - "CasualtyXHolby" - with Holby City, originally broadcast in March 2019. He returned for another episode during the series, originally broadcast on 13 April 2019. Fletch appears when Charlie reports nurse David Hide (Jason Durr) for assault, after David pushes Charlie in self-defence. Fletch investigates the situation and suspends David. Durr explained that his character struggles when "people make untrue assumptions" about him.

In August 2019, Jane Wallbank, the series producer of Holby City, announced plans for "more complex character" crossovers between the two shows. As part of this commitment, Fletch appears again in Casualty during the thirty-fourth series. His appearance was first broadcast on 28 March 2020. The character appears as Charlie is grieving for his wife, Duffy (Cathy Shipton), and concerns have been raised about his wellbeing. Charlie responds poorly to the meeting and confronts Fletch about whether someone has complained. This leads to Charlie quitting his job. Thompson explained that his character is "reacting erratically" after his meeting with Fletch.

=== Temporary paralysis ===
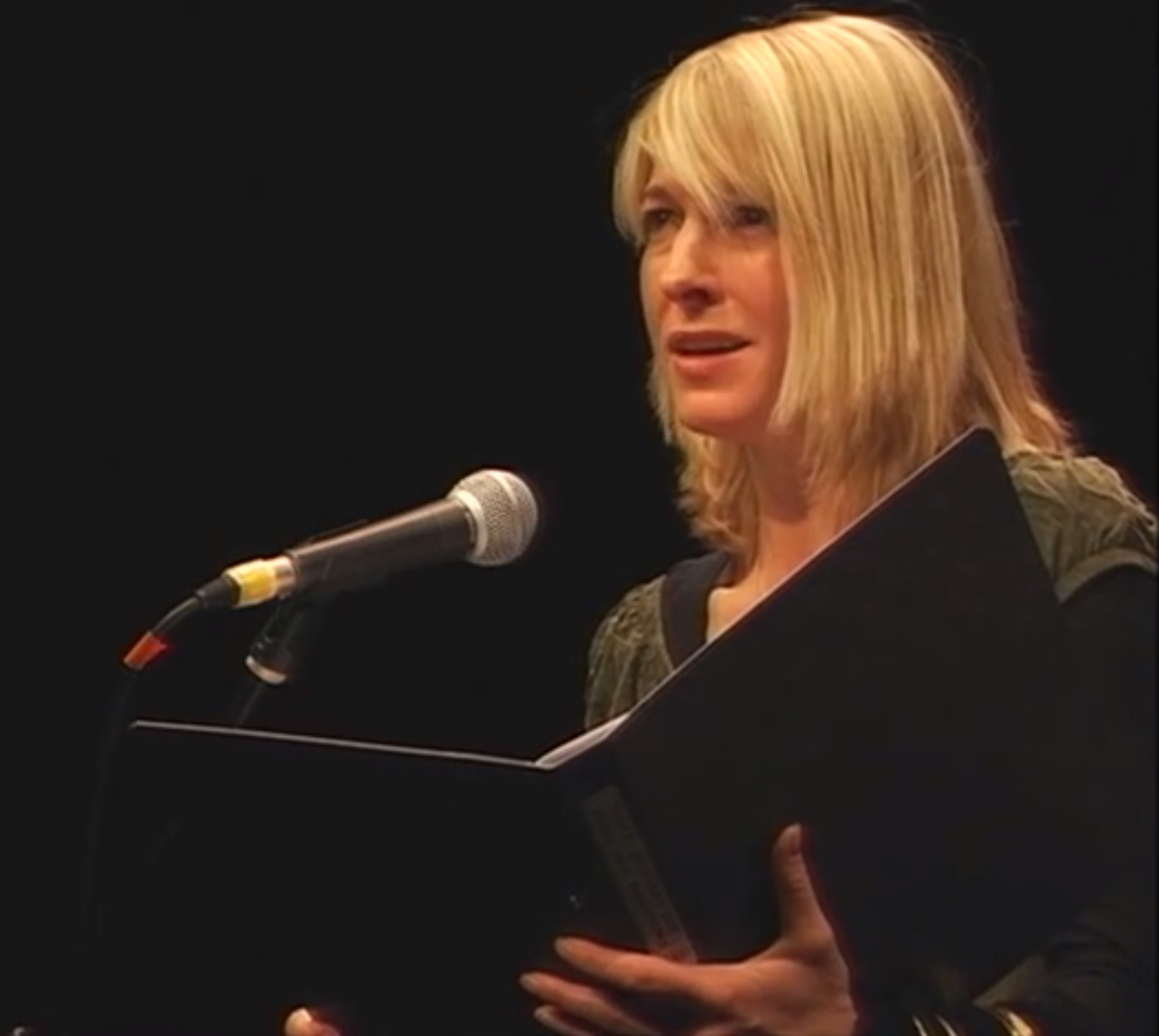
Bernie Wolfe, portrayed by Jemma Redgrave (pictured), felt guilty for Fletch being stabbed.

The aftermath of Casualty's thirtieth anniversary episode was explored in the following Holby City episode, "Protect and Serve". Writers placed Fletch at the centre of the episode and used it to develop a new story for the character. In terms of production, the episode is a standalone episode and was filmed out of order from other episodes. In the episode, Fletch struggles to manage the wards following the crash and has to treat Steph Sims (Tonicha Lawrence), the "unstable" woman who caused Fletch's former colleague Connie Beauchamp (Amanda Mealing) to drive her car off the edge of a cliff. Fletch is also treating James Fielding (Kirk Barker), a patient who is obsessed with consultant Bernie Wolfe (Jemma Redgrave). When Fletch notices James' erratic behaviour, he suggests a psychiatric appointment, but Bernie disagrees. James and Steph disappear from the ward and Fletch discovers them in the basement with James threatening Steph with a screwdriver. As Fletch tries to calm him down, James accidentally stabs Fletch in the stomach. Fletch is taken to theatre, where Serena and Bernie save his life. Afterwards, Bernie confides in Serena that she blames herself for Fletch's condition. When asked why Fletch had suffered so much, Walkinshaw replied that it made for more entertaining storylines. He continued, "It is hard, but it shows good strength of character every time he has to pick himself up again." Walkinshaw thought it was realistic for so many bad things to happen to Fletch, but expected that something good would happen to him eventually. Harper explained that because Fletch is an "everyman" and a character who "the audience are always rooting for", it works when several bad things happen to him. He joked that Fletch had become a "punch bag" on the show.

"Here we're seeing Fletch both emotionally and physically vulnerable and in a situation that's beyond his control. This time, he can't just pick himself up, brush himself off or tell a joke. This is serious."

— Walkinshaw on the severity of Fletch's condition. (2016)

Writers planted a "worrying twist" in the story when Fletch's blood pressure drops as doctors attempt to wake him from his coma. However, when doctors try to awake Fletch again, he successfully awakes. Raf then takes over Fletch's care. Walkinshaw explained that Fletch and Raf's friendship is that close that Raf wants to do anything he can to save Fletch. Fletch's health deteriorates and he falls from his bed and injures himself. As a result, Fletch cannot feel anything in his legs and feet, leaving Raf "alarmed". Raf and Bernie then perform a lumbar puncture on Fletch and he is "terrified" when he cannot feel the needle. Walkinshaw told Wilson (What's on TV) that Fletch panics that he could die and his children would be parentless. Fletch then asks Raf to care for his children if he dies. Walkinshaw described the moment as "emotional" and opined that it is "lovely that two 'blokey' men can be that close and honest with each other". Raf promises to care for the children, but tells Fletch that he will save his life.

Walkinshaw had to lie in bed for most of the story as Fletch was unable to move. He found himself falling asleep between takes as he was still in the bed. The actor felt that being in bed helped him realise how frustrating it would be for Fletch and let his "emotions wash over [him] and come out of [him]." Walkinshaw found working with his co-stars helpful as he could use their performance to boost his performance. He explained that when some actors give a powerful performance for their close-up, but fail to maintain this emotion for his close-up, he can struggle to perform to his best ability. Raf eventually diagnosis Fletch with Guillain–Barré syndrome, but when he treats Fletch for this, the nurse suffers from anaphylactic shock. Walkinshaw stated that Raf's treatment almost kills Fletch. As Fletch continues to recover from his paralysis, he begins physiotheraphy and manages to walk a few steps. However, Fletch tries to do too much and falls, dislocating his shoulder and knocking patient Jay Nevin (Cassidy Little) unconscious. As Jay has a seizure and starts foaming at the mouth, Fletch is forced to help him as he cannot reach the call button. Fletch "hoists" himself from his bed and lays next to Jay, stopping him choking and shouting for help. The aftermath of Fletch's stabbing was filmed before the actual stabbing as it was part of the standalone episode. Because of this, Walkinshaw was required to remember multiple scripts at once while pretending not to know about following episodes onscreen. Series production manager Ali Liddle thought that it was "quite a discipline for [him] to remember".

=== Inheritance ===
In December 2016, Nicholas Woodeson was introduced as "cheeky yet vulnerable patient" Artem Chernik, who is a former professional poker player. Artem returns after being admitted following a collapse at the airport. Fletch discovers that he was travelling to see his long-lost daughter and decides to find her. Fletch manages to find Artem's daughter, but she refuses to have contact with him. Artem is later admitted to the AAU again, where he reveals that he won a large amount of money at the casino the previous night. Fletch is "gobsmacked" when Artem reveals he is carrying his winnings in cash. When it is discovered that Artem needs a life-threatening operation, Fletch manages to get him a less risky operation. After much deliberation, Artem agrees to the surgery, but he dies in theatre, leaving Fletch gutted. After learning about Artem's death, Fletch discovers that Artem changed his will and testament before surgery and that he has left everything, including his winnings, to Fletch. Fletch then decides to repay everyone who he has ever borrowed money from. However, a patient makes him realise that he should spend some of the money on himself. Walkinshaw enjoyed working with Woodeson, who he described as "a proper heavyweight", and would often find himself chatting with him in between takes. He believed that their friendship enabled the characters to portray the chemistry that was wanted for the scenes.

On 13 December 2016, it was announced that Gemma Oaten would make a guest appearance in the show. Her appearance as Sydney Somers was previewed in a show trailer released in March 2017. It was teased that Sydney would "cause a world of trouble for Fletch due to her connection with someone close to him." Laura-Jayne Tyler of Inside Soap confirmed that Oaten would play an agency nurse who believes that Fletch has money that belongs to her. She added that Sydney would be "fiercely determined to get her hands on it!". Oaten told Tyler that she enjoyed filming with Walkinshaw and learnt a lot from him. Sydney first appears in April 2017. She arrives on the ward as Fletch has "an upbeat outlook on life", which Sydney manages to destroy throughout the day. As Fletch finds out more information about Sydney, he is "dumbstruck" to discover that she is Artem's daughter. Sydney then threatens Fletch with legal action over a claim to Artem's inheritance. Fletch is surprised when Sydney reappears on the AAU the following week. Oaten told Kayleigh Giles of the Daily Express that Fletch is "absolutely gobsmacked" when Sydney returns as he thought she had no more shifts at the hospital. As Fletch prepares to go on holiday with his family, he questions whether he deserves the inheritance.

Producers invited Oaten to reprise her role for a guest appearance in 2018. Sydney returns in a new position. Now in charge of agency nurses, Sydney meets with Fletch to discuss the shortage on AAU. Fletch asks the agency nurses to work an extra 30 minutes unpaid, but Sydney rejects the idea, so he refuses to take any more of her agency staff. Fletch is criticised for his actions by his superiors. Walkinshaw explained that his character is "getting a bit of a wake-up call". They later manage to reach a compromise over staffing and he asks Sydney for a drink after work.

=== Move to management ===
In 2017, writers challenged Fletch in his career with a move into management. Fletch competes with Donna and Essie Harrison (Kaye Wragg) for the role of Director of Nursing. On the day of his interview, his managerial skills are tested in a real life application. He has to unexpectedly find some theatre space and enlists Jac's help in operating on the patient. Fletch receives the promotion and is moved to Darwin ward. Walkinshaw hoped that with his promotion, Fletch could "bring a bit of normal-speak to the boardroom, something we can understand." The character's promotion also led to a change in costume for Walkinshaw; instead of scrubs, Fletch began wearing suits. The actor was sad about the change in costume as he found the scrubs comfortable to wear, likening them to pyjamas. Walkinshaw also jokingly created a new nickname for him and his character: "The Don", standing for Director of Nursing.

Reflecting on the position in 2020, Walkinshaw felt unsure about his character's suitability and thought it was too detached from his career as a nurse. Writers devised problems for Fletch when the hospital experiences a nursing shortage. Walkinshaw thought it was "stressful" for Fletch as he believes he cannot provide "adequate patient care". He added that Fletch feels to blame if it cannot be resolved. Fletch begins to experience lots of "fatigue, stress and anxiety" as a result of the pressure of his position.

Fletch becomes the hospital's acting chief executive officer (CEO) in April 2021, following the arrest of Max McGerry (Jo Martin) and a lack of other candidate. Walkinshaw noted that Fletch "became CEO by default really". Fletch struggles with the pressure that comes with the role and has to deal with multiple issues. Walkinshaw explained that it was "just too big a job for Fletch" and "a massive step up" from his normal position. Writers created an ethical conflict for Fletch when the nurses, led by Donna, threaten to strike. Whilst Fletch wants to pay nurses appropriately for their overtime, he is prevented from agreeing to the pay rise by the director of funding, Jeni Sinclair (Debra Stephenson). Fletch is also challenged when Hanssen requests to see the coroner's report for his childhood abuser, which the CEO is only allowed to see. Walkinshaw told Wilson (What to Watch) that Fletch is conflicted but "will always have a lot of respect" for Hanssen as he gave him the Director of Nursing job. Hanssen, who was initially offered the acting CEO position, then decides that he has changed his mind, so Fletch resigns. The character was later demoted from Director of Nursing in July 2021.

=== Jac Naylor and Abigail Tait ===
In an August 2017 interview with Digital Spy, series producer Kate Hall revealed that she had paired Fletch with Jac Naylor, the director of cardiothoracics, for a new storyline as she thought that they had a "palpable" connection. She billed the pairing as "delicious and electric" and compared it to Bruce Willis and Cybill Shepherd in Moonlighting or Cary Grant and Katharine Hepburn. On the comparison, Marcel told Laura-Jayne Tyler, writing for Inside Soap, that she loved playing the Moonlighting aspect of the relationship and that Walkinshaw would be Shepherd to her Willis. Hall confirmed that the storyline would begin on 29 August and teased that the storyline would see Jac "let her guard down" as she starts to grieve for her sister Jasmine. Hall added that the performances between Walkinshaw and Marcel were "mind-blowing" and that it was clear that they had "a really strong connection".

"As a woman she intimidates the hell out of him, as a surgeon he knows she's great, she's the head of the department etcetera, but he finds the confidence in himself to say, 'Who are you talking to like that? Don't talk to my nurses like that. Don't talk to me like that. You're not my boss'. And she's not."

— Walkinshaw on how Fletch sees Jac. (2017)

The story begins when Fletch interviews for the Director of Nursing position and has to ask Jac for her help. Walkinshaw pointed out that Jac is a completely different person to Fletch and noted that Jac is used to telling a man off as he stands opposite her desk and reminding them who is in charge. Walkinshaw thought the pairing would be "interesting" as Jac is very formidable and Fletch is not afraid to challenge her. He hoped for clashes between the pair as well as some nicer scenes. Writers developed the pair's relationship over many months with events happening within the hospital. Fletch and Jac eventually arrange a date to the zoo with their children. However, a staff shortage means they have to cancel and work together in surgery instead. Fletch learns that Jac had planned to leave Holby before the hospital shooting and questions what changed her mind. Jac leaves the hospital for four weeks of annual leave but opts not to tell Fletch about her feelings first. A What to Watch columnist thought that "it's obvious Jac has eyes for Fletch". Marcel told Laura-Jayne Tyler from Inside Soap that she and Walkinshaw did not want to be paired together as they felt that the characters would not suit. She hoped that they would not share a kiss and compared it to "snogging my brother!"

Abigail Tait (Olivia Poulet), the hospital's new chief executive officer, is introduced following Jac's exit. Writers portrayed Fletch as struggling in the absence of Jac and he accuses Abigail of undermining patient care to "put herself on the map". The pair continue to clash over managerial decisions. When hiring a new senior staff nurse, Abigail insists on interviewing multiple candidates whilst Fletch wants to hire Donna. In one episode, Abigail begins to question Fletch's suitability to his role after his altercation with Sydney and a second incident with a visitor on the ward. Walkinshaw explained that Fletch is "really under the cosh" and receives a "wake-up call" from Abigail. The episode begins with Fletch and an unknown blonde woman waking up in bed together, before rewinding to explore the previous day. Walkinshaw teased that it could be "absolutely anyone" as Fletch is a "bit of a Jack-the-lad who likes to 'play the averages'". Abigail is then revealed to be the mystery woman. Walkinshaw enjoyed the focus on Fletch's romantic life and opined that it had become "a barren waste ground".

Jac was then reintroduced into the show, although writers shifted the main focus of Jac's stories away from her relationship with Fletch and instead made this a secondary feature. Walkinshaw explained that the story was designed to be a slow-burner and did not feel it was appropriate for the relationship to develop quickly. Fletch is surprised by Jac's return. Marcel thought that it was "obvious" that Fletch had missed Jac and liked this element. On their relationship, the actress commented, "Fletch suffers her and she knows he suffers her". The primary focus of Jac's return is her health and she prepares for an operation which Fletch disagrees with. They have a heart-to-heart about her health and her future. Marcel told Tyler (Inside Soap) that Jac does not want to burden Fletch with her problems as she recognises that she is a "complicated soul". Walkinshaw added that while others view Jac's health problems from a medical perspective, Fletch is focusing on the emotional angle.

Fletch and Jac's relationship was re-explored when they work together on an operation. They argue over Fletch's focus but when he returns to apologise, he finds Jac unconscious. Afterwards, Fletch avoids seeing Jac as he feels guilty. Once he learns about her near-fatal condition, Fletch suffers a panic attack but later visits her. Their friendship strengthens and develops over many months. Frieda encourages Fletch to discuss his feelings with Jac, who "shies away" from the conversation and insists they are just colleagues. Despite this, Fletch persists and reminds Jac of their connection; they then share a kiss. In the aftermath, Jac pushes Fletch away and tells him that he is not good enough. Walkinshaw thought his character was "gutted" by this development but admired his "determination" in building a relationship with Jac. He told Tyler (Inside Soap) that Jac values Fletch more as a friend and does not want to lose this friendship as Fletch has "the ability to cut through her bristle and hardness". As Fletch realises that a relationship is not viable with Jac, he decides to settle for a friendship. Walkinshaw commented, "Fletch is gallant in accepting that having part of her is better than having none of her." Marcel was pleased with the decision to keep Fletch and Jac as purely friends. She felt that her character would have hurt Fletch and "everyone would be upset that she hurt him".

=== Introduction of father ===
Jesse Birdsall was cast in the series as Fletch's estranged father, Steven Fletcher, in July 2018. A reporter from Inside Soap wrote that it would not be a "joyful reunion" for Fletch and Steven as the former bans his father from meeting his children. The character's shared backstory states that they have been estranged for 17 years. It also states that Fletch was born when Steven was 15, making him a young father. Walkinshaw admitted that viewers initially struggled with this concept. Steven arrives after Evie contacts him on social media. When Fletch learns about this, he is furious and warns Steven away. Despite this, he promises to stay in contact with Evie. Over multiple episodes, Fletch and Steven eventually reconcile with the former "starting to enjoy" Steven's presence. Having previously worked together on an episode of Anna Lee in 1994, Walkinshaw enjoyed working with Birdsall again and felt they shared "good chemistry".

Writers used the character of Steven to develop Fletch's relationship with Jac as she becomes wary of his intentions. After he collapses on her, Steven admits to a "furious" Jac that he may have a hereditary lung disease and does not want to tell Fletch. Steven then leaves Holby on Jac's orders, confusing Fletch. Steven returns to the hospital as a patient, admitted with broken ribs and a collapsed lung. Fletch confronts him about his disappearance. He admits the reasons behind his exit and although Fletch is initially annoyed with Jac, Steven encourages him to realise that Jac did it because she cares for him.

In November 2018, Inside Soap reported that the show's Christmas episode would focus on Fletch and Steven's relationship after "an explosive family secret" is revealed. The episode highlights how Fletch struggles with the Christmas period due to some "painful memories". His backstory is explored as it is explained that Steven abandoned his family on Christmas Eve after struggling with his own father's death at Christmas years prior. The episode begins with a flashback to Fletch as a child. Young actor Aaron Mullen was cast as the younger version of Fletch. Jack Donoghue was introduced as Jaiyden Taylor, the stepson of Steven; Jaiyden and his siblings had been raised by Steven. Fletch found the revelation emotional and struggled with his feelings. Fletch speaks with Jaiyden's mother and Evie, and eventually, he learns the reason behind Steven leaving and decides to spend Christmas with him.

=== Relationship with Ange Godard ===
In January 2019, consultant Ange Godard (Dawn Steele) was introduced. Tyler from Inside Soap noticed chemistry between Walkinshaw and Steele during filming when visiting the set and asked Steele about a possible relationship between their characters. She was unsure about any plans for the characters, but thought it should not be for a while due to Fletch's story with Jac and Ange's new storylines. Dainty (Digital Spy) theorised that the characters may be paired romantically after spotting their closeness and after Ange's daughter Chloe Godard (Amy Lennox) noted their chemistry.

The characters begin to appear together during the two-part episode "A Simple Lie", focusing on Ange's right to life story. As Ange is targeted by protestors over her treatment of a braindead patient, Fletch offers her support. She is attacked by the protestors, so Fletch publicly defends her. Steele thought it was nice that Ange had support from Fletch. Fletch becomes the focus of the second part of the episode as his son Theo goes missing after playing in the hospital car park. Fletch works with Jac and Hanssen to search CCTV footage and eventually receives contact from the kidnapper, who suggests they are a protestor and warns him not to involve the police. Fletch searches the hospital armed with a surgical scalpel and Ange helps him with the search. Steele explained that Ange feels guilty as she brought the protestors to the hospital. In an interview with What's on TV's Wilson, Steele revealed that it emerges that it is "really not Ange's fault". A surprise twist in the episode exposed former agency nurse Amira Zafar (Poppy Jhakra) as Theo's kidnapper. Fletch rescues his son and Amira is talked down from the edge of the hospital roof by Ange.

Over time, a romance between Fletch and Ange was developed by scriptwriters. Jane Wallbank, the show's series producer, pointed out that the couple "fancy each other rotten", despite not being compatible. She told Dainty (Digital Spy), "He’s a homebody with four young kids and Ange is more adventurous". After working through paperwork together, Ange asks Fletch out for a drink. He reassures her amidst fears that her children will not forgive her for keeping secrets. Steele opined that Fletch makes Ange laugh and "provides some light relief for her" serious personality. The actress enjoyed how the relationship demonstrated a playful side to her character. Writers created obstacles for the pair in their developing relationship. They organise their first date and Fletch dresses in a new suit for the occasion. At work, the pair find themselves in disagreement when Fletch has to reprimand Ange for working too much unpaid overtime. Fletch worries that he has ruined his chances, but Ange still arrives for their date, delighting their colleagues. Steele observed that Fletch was "like Ange's guardian angel recently". She admitted that she had not been told how the relationship would progress. The pair's relationship was challenged again by his involvement with Chloe's stalker Evan Crowhurst (Jack Ryder). Fletch decides to investigate Evan and invites him for a drink, infuriating Ange. However, they reconcile when Fletch manages to expose Evan for planting a camera in Chloe's flat and have him arrested.

During Fletch's cancer story, his relationship with Ange was sidelined. Production was suspended on Holby City in light of COVID-19 pandemic restrictions. After running out of episodes filmed before production paused, the show took an hiatus in August 2020. In the final episode before the hiatus, writers created hints of tension between Fletch and Ange with an intention for this tension to be explored in subsequent episodes. When the show returns to broadcast in November 2020, their relationship is explored again. Fletch begins "some major soul-searching" about his future and questions whether Ange is part of that. Similarly, Ange begins to question whether they have a future.

=== Cancer ===
In 2020, producers devised a new story for Fletch exploring the issue of cancer. The plot was played in conjunction with Essie Harrison (Kaye Wragg) learning that her cancer has returned and the pair navigate their diagnoses together. Together, Fletch and Essie prepare for the challenges of their battles, learning "their worst fears, their lost opportunities and what futures they need to make plans for". Through the plot, Fletch's relationship with Ange is also challenged as they "face their darkest fears". Harper was initially apprehensive about portraying two cancer stories simultaneously, but realised it was important to highlight how statistically, it was realistic for colleagues to experience this at the same time. Wragg liked the decision to portray the stories together and commented, "Showing the real struggle of two nurses sharing an illness together yet being alone in their own torture of what their futures hold is Holby at its best." She was prepared for the plot to be hard to watch, but thought it was important representation for cancer sufferers. Harper praised the "heartbreaking" performances of Walkinshaw and Wragg during the story. Walkinshaw added that the story was emotional to film but enjoyed starring opposite Wragg during it. He commented, "This storyline is good, bad, happy and sad and it's important we show all that." Wragg liked the opportunity to work opposite Walkinshaw, having worked with him regularly on The Bill, and felt that she could portray the story authentically when filming opposite him.

Writers began the story with Essie's formal diagnosis while portraying early signs in Fletch's health, such as experiencing "worrying dizzy spells". Fletch soon notices his exhaustion and secretly orders tests, predicting a diagnosis of diabetes. However, when he receives the results, he learns that he has prostate cancer. Walkinshaw explained that Fletch feels "shocked, devastated and scared" by the news and becomes worried for his children, especially as Natalie is dead. Fletch confides in Essie about his diagnosis, aware that she also has cancer, and encourages him to speak to Hanssen. Walkinshaw believed that Fletch feels happy telling Hanssen as he has "a lot of respect" for him. Hanssen recommends starting treatment immediately, explaining he will need a prostatectomy and radiotherapy. Essie admits that she is unsure about continuing treatment, but Fletch insists they do not give up. They agree to become "one another's rocks" and offer each other support. Walkinshaw opined that the pair can truly understand each other, like nobody else can. He noted that they agree to provide each other with "support, conversation, normality and honesty".

Evie was reintroduced into the series as part of the story, but the role was recast to Phoebe French. She returns as Fletch prepares for his operation at St James' Hospital, having told his children that he is going on holiday with Ange. A show publicist noted that "poor Evie is none the wiser". Evie informs Fletch that she is planning to leave school, having fallen behind while caring for her siblings. Walkinshaw explained that Fletch is struggling to focus on his treatment whilst also being a single parent. He recognised that his character is not "the most conventional dad - but he's the best dad he can be". A show insider told Tyler (Inside Soap) that Fletch believes he has let his children down, so plans to cancel his operation. Essie realises this and chats to Evie, prompting Fletch to tell her the truth. Fletch is then informed that his operation has been cancelled, so Hanssen and Essie arrange for it to take place at Holby. Walkinshaw explained that Fletch "struggles with paranoia, uncertainty and insecurity" about his surgery. He has concerns about the future and asks Jac and Sacha to look after his children if he dies. Although the surgery is initially deemed successful, Fletch then has to have an emergency operation after suffering blackouts.

Fletch and Essie's story took focus in an episode taking place over three weeks, concluding with an appointment to learn if their treatment was working. The change in timeframe was designed to provide the story with "some proper momentum". In the cancer suite, the pair meet Jasper, a teenage patient with bowel cancer. Walkinshaw explained that "unlikely relationships are formed" in cancer suites as there are people of varying ages. At first, Fletch enjoys joking with Jasper but later shouts at him over his blasé attitude to a serious situation. Walkinshaw noted how Fletch and Jasper are "on different parts of the journey", highlighting how reactions may differ. Fletch learns that Jasper is preparing for major surgery and the teenager admits that he is scared of dying. Fletch supports him and the operation is successful. At the episode's conclusion, Fletch learns that his operation was successful and he is in remission, while Essie finds out her cancer is terminal. Essie's story concludes with her exit. On her wedding day, Fletch escorts Essie to the hospital chapel but when they arrive, Fletch finds that Essie has died peacefully.

=== Kian Madani ===
A Holby City promotional trailer, released on 29 April 2021, included scenes of Fletch confronting consultant Kian Madani (Ramin Karimloo) after Evie and Andrei Tarpov (Sonny Poon Tip) are stabbed. Dainty (Digital Spy) reported that Fletch would be drawn into "the tangled web of Kian's chaos" after Evie becomes involved with Andrei, a patient who Kian is over-involved with. Walkinshaw explained that this story would challenge his friendship with Kian and commented, "It's not going to be an easy journey for any of them." He teased that there would be "huge rows, confrontation, blame and guilt". Writers gave Evie a job at Pulses, the hospital café, to establish her into the show's main setting. Walkinshaw explained that Fletch is proud of his daughter "showing her independence and her maturity". He recognised that Evie has had to grow up fast following Natalie's death, taking on lots of maternal responsibilities in the house. Evie meets Andrei and they bond quickly, making Fletch wary. Walkinshaw told Wilson (What to Watch) that his character's "paternal instinct kicks in" and he becomes "very protective". He added that Andrei's appearance reminds Fletch that Evie is "still his little girl". Despite his cautiousness around Andrei, Fletch decides to trust him because he trusts Kian.

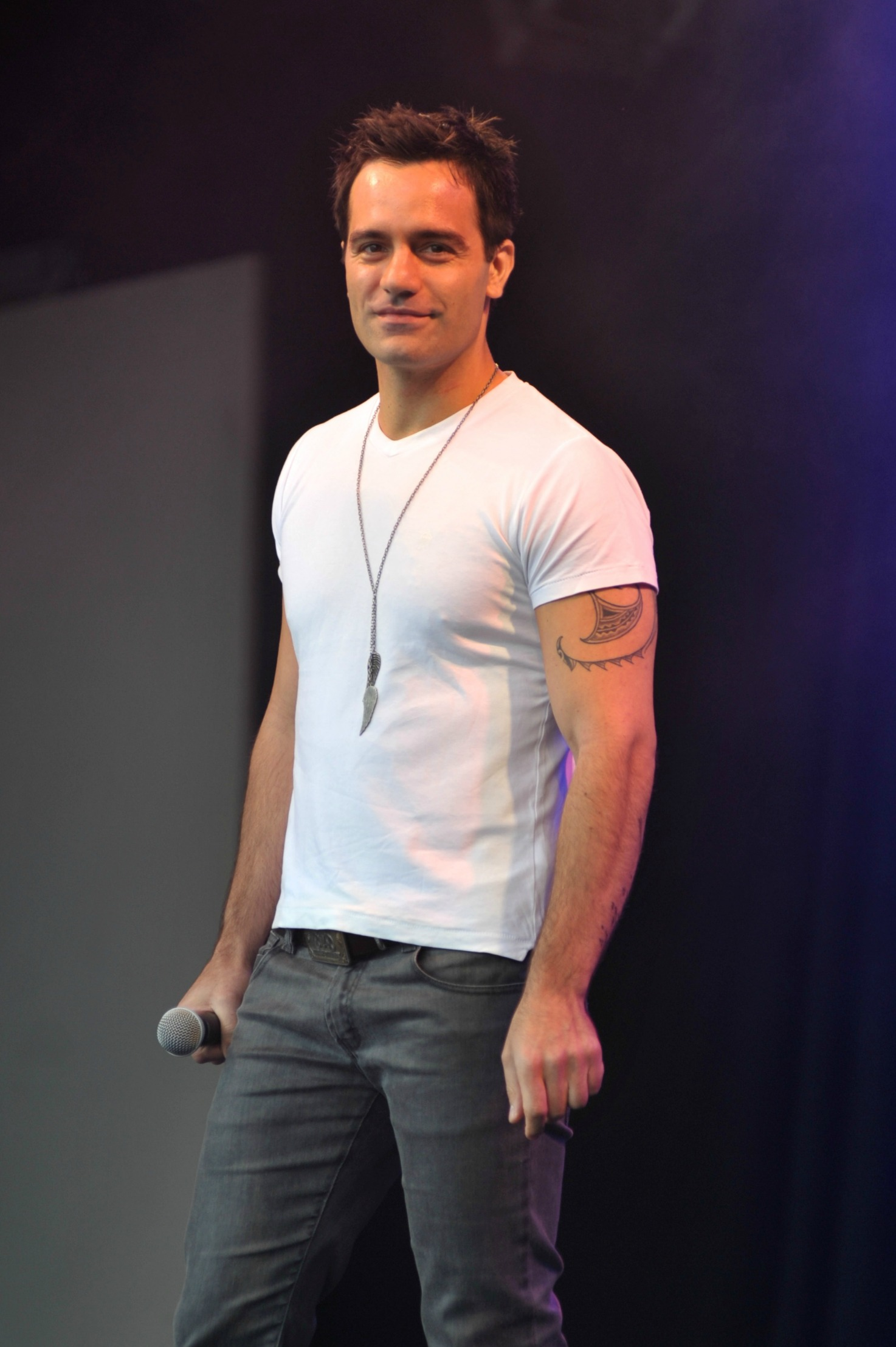
Ramin Karimloo portrays Kian Madani, who Fletch clashes with.

Andrei goes missing but Evie finds him badly beaten outside the hospital. Fletch is annoyed when he learns about Evie's involvement and warns nurse Lucky Simpson (Vineeta Rishi), who is involved with Kian and Andrei, that she needs to inform social services otherwise he will. Fletch warns Evie and Andrei to stay away from each other. Lucky contacts social services, but regrets it. When Andrei realises what is happening, he panics and runs away with Evie. Fletch realises and reacts by punching Kian. Walkinshaw explained that his character becomes aggressive because one of his children have become involved. He pointed out, "He reacts in a way you haven't see Fletch react before". The actor enjoyed playing the "dark and angry" side to his character.

Following this, the show's publicity team released a trailer to promote the next episode. Lidia Molina-Whyte thought it highlighted that the drama "shows no signs of slowing down". Evie and Andrei are stabbed by the gang looking for Andrei and admitted into the hospital. Karimloo highlighted that the pair are in serious danger. Kian feels unsure about who should be the priority for treatment and clashes with Fletch who believes Evie should be the priority. However, the choice is removed when Evie's condition deteriorates. Fletch bans Kian from operating on his daughter, believing him to be unfit. Karimloo understood the decision and noted that Fletch has "lost faith and trust in Kian", both personally and professionally. He added that Fletch is still unclear about the relationship between Kian and Andrei, which does not help his ability to trust Kian. Fletch berates Kian and reminds him of the deaths of his wife and girlfriend, sending him spiralling.

In a twist, the episode ends with Fletch finding Kian unconscious after taking a drug overdose. His fate was left unresolved until the next episode, where he is pronounced dead. Writers played out Fletch's guilt about Kian's death alongside his concerns for Evie who is encountering complications in theatre. On the intensity of the situation, Walkinshaw said, "Life isn't always sweetness and light, sometimes it's just rubbish and people go through one catastrophic event after another." Fletch tells Andrei that he will set him up with a new life away from Evie, which infuriates her. Walkinshaw thought Fletch "handles things really badly" but justified it as Fletch being protective over "his little girl". Jeni speaks to Evie and reassures her that there will be other boys, but Evie tells Fletch that she will not forgive him. Walkinshaw told Wilson that Fletch will "never not have a stressful life".

=== Jeni Sinclair ===
Debra Stephenson joined the cast as Jeni Sinclair, the new director of funding, in April 2021. She was also introduced as a new love interest for Fletch. Walkinshaw felt that the pair were compatible and noted how they bond quickly. They connect over having teenage children; Jeni has a teenage niece. Fletch finds Jeni "easy to talk to" and considers her a "very friendly" and "attractive woman". Walkinshaw noted how the pair enjoy "flirty banter", causing him to believe that "he's in with a shot". When a major incident takes place at the hospital, Jeni offers to help out. Walkinshaw commented, "that’s always gonna go down well with someone like Fletch". Stephenson felt that her character had "all of the attributes [Fletch would] look for in a woman".

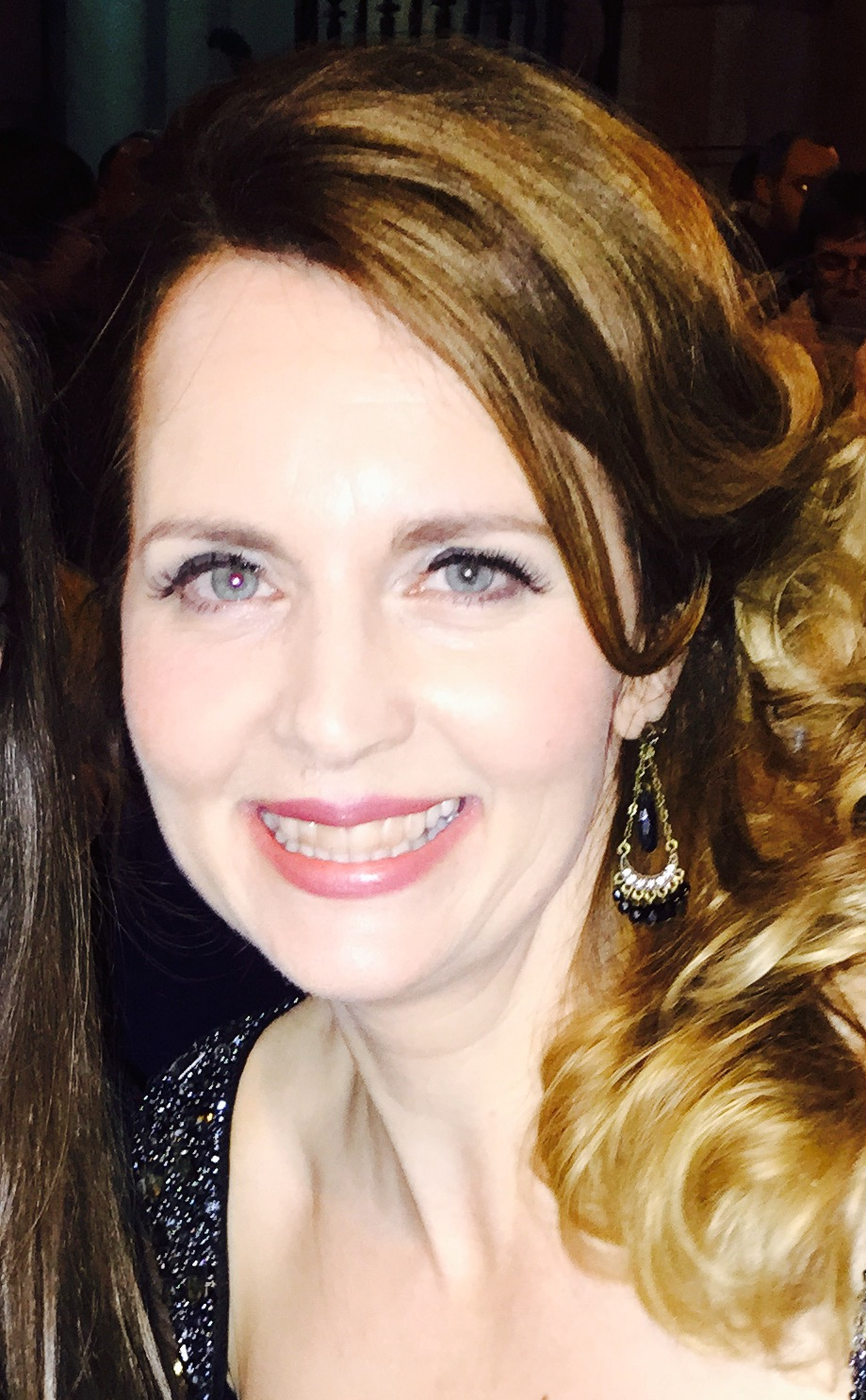
Debra Stephenson portrays Jeni Sinclair, who grooms Fletch's daughter Evie.

Writers began to showcase suspicious behaviour from Jeni, making the audience question her motives. Through her relationship with Fletch, she develops a close relationship with Evie and creates conflict between father and daughter. Jeni is then revealed to be the leader of a sex ring and is grooming teenage girls like Evie. Stephenson described her character as "a woman living a double life" who is using her "extremely trustworthy" nature to draw in vulnerable girls. Dainty (Digital Spy) described the sexual exploitation story as "one of the show's darkest stories to date". Richard Pepper was introduced into the plot as patient Rich Peterson, a man who uses Jeni's sexual exploitation business. Rich becomes interested in Evie, but Jeni is hesitant to involve Evie. Stephenson noted that Jeni wants to distance her two lives and keep her business secret. Rich pays highly to be connected with Evie, which Jeni arranges through a hospital fundraising event. Stephenson explained that Jeni's grooming business clients are the same benefactors for the hospital. She added that her guilt is balanced out by the money she is raising for the NHS.

Evie begins a relationship with Rich, which she initially hides from her father. However, she eventually changes her mind and prepares to tell Fletch. Before she can, Fletch witnesses an intimate conversation between the pair and punches Rich, who ends up hospitalised and requiring emergency surgery. Jeni becomes worried that her crimes will be exposed, so she threatens Evie into not exposing her, otherwise she will report Fletch to the police. Stephenson pointed out that although Jeni is interested in Fletch, "no relationship will stop Jeni continuing with her business". Rich is later awoken from his coma and Fletch warns him away from Evie again. Rich tells Jeni to keep Fletch away, so she threatens Evie again. Lucky is then admitted to the hospital with a major head injury, having been found in Jeni's office. Evie had confessed to Lucky about Jeni's crimes and when Jeni found Lucky with proof of her crimes, she attacked her. Fletch then receives images of the proof Lucky obtained. Walkinshaw confirmed that this would spark "a road of discovery" for Fletch.

The show's publicity team released a trailer for the following episode, previewing Fletch and Donna learning that their daughters had been abused. Donna's daughter, Mia Barron (Brianna Shann), is admitted and undergoes emergency surgery for an ectopic pregnancy. Fletch questions Evie over an argument with Mia and she reveals everything; Fletch feels "sick to his stomach". The scene was filmed in a corridor, having originally planned to be filmed outdoors. The change happened after it unexpectedly rained. French found the scene challenging to film and was grateful to have Walkinshaw to play opposite. Fletch then informs Donna, who is furious, and they unite to find Jeni before she flees the hospital. However, they soon change their mind and report her instead. They are then shocked when Jeni arrives for work, unaware that she has been exposed. Stephenson pointed out that her character is a "sociopath" who can justify her actions easily. Jeni soon realises that something is wrong and plans to leave Holby, taking Evie with her. Writers created a final showdown as Fletch and Donna work together to track down Jeni. Jeni hides out with a weapon, where Fletch and Evie find her and convince her to return her weapon. She is then arrested. Stephenson explained, "the more Jeni's cornered, the more she fights for herself". She also highlighted the real-life importance of this story.

Following Jeni's departure, writers shifted the focus of the story to Fletch and Donna's friendship. Struggling with her own guilt, Donna blames Fletch and Evie for allowing Mia to become involved in Jeni's grooming. Jacobs explained that Donna feels that Fletch should not have let Jeni into their lives and now believes that Fletch is a danger to her child. She added, "For Donna, the damage is done." Lucky, who was paralysed by her attack and is now a patient, is brought into the story when she tries to reconcile Fletch and Donna. Rishi told Wilson (What's on TV) that Lucky uses her "emotional skills" and believes that she "can make a difference to the pair". Writers did not fix the friendship before the show's final episode. Walkinshaw recognised that it was hard to resolve what happened, but predicted that if the show continued, the pair's mature attitudes would lead to them reuniting. The story concludes when Lucky engineers a heart-to-heart between Fletch and Evie. This marked French's final appearance on the show. She enjoyed working opposite Walkinshaw and felt that he taught her a lot.

=== Final stories ===
In June 2021, it was announced that Holby City had been cancelled after twenty-three series. The final episode was broadcast in March 2022. The decision to cancel the show was criticised and Walkinshaw appreciated the love shown to Holby City following the announcement. Story producer Ben Wadey told Calli Kitson from Metro that the story team had to create suitable endings for all the regular characters. Fletch's final stories included becoming disillusioned with the hospital and supporting Jac through her terminal illness and surgeries. A promotional trailer was released on 29 December 2021, previewing the final stories of the show. This included Fletch being offered a new job away from the hospital.

One of the show's final stories portray the hospital facing closure after a poor inspection. One of the inspectors, Regina Marriott (Karen Ascoe), works at neighbouring hospital St. James. She offers Fletch a managerial position at the hospital, which he considers. Fletch treats a young boy, Harry Carabello (Harry Guibileo), who is awaiting cardiothoracic surgery after his first two operations were cancelled. He is "livid" when Harry's operation is cancelled again for a higher priority case. Fletch arranges for the surgery to take place at St. James, but Harry suffers a cardiac arrest en route and they have to return to Holby. Jac then informs Fletch that Harry has died, so he announces that he is leaving. An Inside Soap columnist noted that "Fletch's faith in the system is left seriously dented". Fletch and Jac have a conversation, where she encourages him to stay because she needs his support. Fletch then calls Regina and declines the job.

The show's story team moved the focus of the final episodes away from the hospital's potential closure and instead, opted to explore the ramifications of Jac's terminal illness on those surrounding her. Fletch's close relationship with Jac meant that he was involved in the story prominently. Writers used their relationship to write an emotional scene where Fletch learns about Jac's illness. Fletch feels upset that Jac did not tell him, but she explains that she enjoyed "the false reality Fletch's obliviousness allowed". Paul Bradley reprised his role as Elliot Hope as part of the final episodes. In the narrative, Fletch calls Elliot and asks him to operate on Jac.

Fletch appears in the show's finale episode, which was broadcast on 29 March 2022. The episode features the death of Jac. They share their final scenes together when Jac asks Fletch to arrange an Advance Decision to Refuse Treatment (ADRT) for her, which he initially rejects. Jac then suffers a stroke and when alone, Fletch sits by her bedside and cries. The final shot of the episode sees the team, including Fletch, prepare for a major incident. Wadey explained that this was designed to demonstrate how life continues. Walkinshaw praised the episode and told Elaine Reilly and Victoria Wilson from TVTimes that everyone wanted the episode to be best. He enjoyed the final story and thought it was an appropriate end to the drama. Walkinshaw was proud of his character's development. He liked his characterisation as a working single father and the journey that came with that, but deemed working with the actors playing his children as his "best delight".

Walkinshaw reprised his role as Fletch for one episode of Casualty following the finale. He appears in the series 36 episode "Judgement Call", first broadcast on 2 April 2022. Fletch meets Charlie to chat about Jac, reflecting on her work and their relationship. Walkinshaw enjoyed filming the scene with Thompson and opined that it was "tinged with sadness". The actor ruled out a permanent return to Casualty following Holby City's cancellation. He thought that his character was "too old to be running around the ED".

== Reception ==
Walkinshaw was nominated for "Best Actor" at the 2015 TV Choice Awards. Fletch's poverty storyline was shortlisted at the 2016 Inside Soap Awards under the "Best Drama Storyline" category, but lost out to Arthur Digby's (Rob Ostlere) death. Walkinshaw was shortlisted for Best Drama Star at the 2020 and 2022 Inside Soap Awards.

David Butcher of the Radio Times branded Fletch "a cheeky nurse keeping up the jack-the-lad quota now Lennie [sic] has left." Tyler (Inside Soap) described Fletch as "gorgeous". A What's on TV reporter called Fletch "a good nurse but 'a lousy husband'. On Fletch, a columinst from What's on TV commented, "As ward manager of Holby's AAU, Adrian 'Fletch' Fletcher is dedicated to his job, running a tight ship at work while raising four kids as a single dad."

Sophie Dainty of Digital Spy thought that Fletch and Tess' affair was his biggest storyline in Casualty. Tyler (Inside Soap) said that Fletch and Tess' affair had been "a huge talking point". Wilson (What's on TV) dubbed Fletch a "love-rat" and observed that Fletch had "caused quite a stir on the ED". Walkinshaw received a mixed response to Fletch and Tess' affair, commenting, "It's like Marmite – people either love it or hate it." Walkinshaw received a positive reaction the news he was moving to Holby City with some Casualty fans deciding to start watching Holby City as a result of the move. While the actor predicted some bad response, he told Wilson (What's on TV) that he had received a good response to his departure, with some viewers opining that Fletch and Tess could have stayed in a relationship. Producer Harper thought that Fletch's transition to Holby City had played out excellently and called Fletch a "fantastic" character. He added that Walkinshaw had become a "great company member, one of the gang on screen and off."

Delamere revealed that Fletch and Colette's relationship had been well received by fans of the drama. Wilson of What's on TV sympathised with the character, commenting, "as if he hasn’t been through enough in his life, he recently got stabbed by a patient". She also described Fletch asking Raf to care for his children if he dies as "heart-breaking". Walkinshaw also received positive feedback to his onscreen chemistry with Woodeson (Artem Chernik). Multiple members of Holby City's cast and crew told Haasler for her Holby City book how good Walkinshaw is on the show, especially with how he works with the camera.

Tyler from Inside Soap was happy to watch the climax of Fletch and Jac's relationship, writing, "Good news, Holby fans! The wait is finally over". She added that the slow-burn element of the story had created "a frustrating ride for viewers". Calli Kitson, writing for the Metro, praised Fletch and Jac's friendship, mentioning how he was "an unlikely person to be Jac's love interest" but that it forged a beautiful friendship. A Belfast Telegraph reporter praised the Christmas episode focusing on Fletch and Steven's relationship; they deemed it "tearful" and liked the "moving scene" of Fletch realising how much his father loved him. Writing for the Metro, Haasler has spoken positively about Walkinshaw's performances, specifically within the Christmas episode and the "A Simple Lie" two-parter. In a review for the latter episode, she wrote, "Alex Walkinshaw proved once again what a marvellous asset he is to the Holby cast as he took us to the heart of how desperate Fletch was feeling." The reviewer welcomed Fletch's 2019 appearance in Casualty and dubbed him "King of Nurses". Haasler favoured Fletch's relationship with Jac over Ange and opined that if Jac "snapped her fingers he'd drop Ange like a hot brick." She gave the Fletch and Ange pairing the portmanteau "Flange", which she referred to them as in her reviews.

The cancer story with Fletch and Essie received a positive reception upon its announcement. Tyler wrote, "We should be braced for an emotional rollercoaster". Haasler predicted that it would be a "dramatic and emotional" journey for the characters. She thought it was "a difficult path for the Holby team", but an "interesting one". After the story began, Haasler wrote, "It's a heart-rending storyline perfectly played by Alex Walkinshaw and Kaye Wragg." Her colleague, Kitson, believed that Fletch was the standout character in Kian's death episode and praised his "incredibly moving" closing monologue which contrasted the dark tones of the episode. Lucy Buglass of What to Watch observed that viewers were feeling upset for Fletch when Harry dies and he considers quitting. Her colleague Wilson praised the conclusion to Fletch and Jac's friendship in the show's finale and called Fletch crying by Jac's bedside "the real tear-jerker moment" of the episode. The reporter commented, "This was a huge pay-off for fans, who have really invested in Jac and Fletch's friendship."

== Bibliography ==
- Haasler, Sue (2018). Holby City: Behind the Screen. SilverWood Books Ltd. ISBN 978-1-78132-562-9.
