= All at No 20 =

- Genre: Sitcom
- Created by: Richard Ommanney
- Starring: Maureen Lipman; Lisa Jacobs; Martin Clunes
- Theme music composer: Denis King
- Country of origin: United Kingdom
- Original language: English
- No. of series: 2
- No. of episodes: 12

Production
- Producer: Thames Television
- Running time: 30 minutes

Original release
- Network: ITV
- Release: 10 February 1986 – 1 December 1987

All at No 20 is a British sitcom that aired on ITV from 10 February 1986 to 1 December 1987. Starring Maureen Lipman, it was written by Richard Ommanney, Ian Davidson, Peter Vincent and Alex Shearer. It was made for the ITV network by Thames Television and ran for two series.

== Cast ==
- Maureen Lipman as Sheila Haddon, a widow who decides to take in lodgers in order to keep her house. The series revolves around her relationships and her attempts to cover her debts. She is frequently employed as a typist.
- Lisa Jacobs as Monica Haddon, Sheila's daughter, a 20 year old art student. Much of her time is spent fighting with Chris. At the end of Series 1, she starts dating Henry.
- Martin Clunes as Henry, a medical student, who is one of Sheila's lodgers. Henry has difficulties with medical school, as he is quite squeamish. At the end of Series 1, he starts dating Monica.
- Gary Waldhorn as Richard Beamish (series 1), an old friend of Sheila's, who is in love with her, and repeatedly proposes marriage. Beamish is heir to a fortune, and frequently offers (and schemes) to cover Sheila's debts. He was a Commander in the Royal Navy, and is seen to be writing a novel.
- Gabrielle Glaister as Carol (series 1), Monica's best friend and fellow art student, who is one of Sheila's lodgers. Carol frequently flirts with Chris and Henry.
- Gregory Doran as Chris Temple (series 1), one of Sheila's lodgers, who shares a room with Hamish. Chris is an itinerant Disc Jockey, who shows up at Sheila's door looking for a place to stay after briefly meeting Monica at a party. Episodes often feature fallout from Chris's failures as a Disc Jockey; in one episode, he is attacked by Hell's Angels; in another, his van is destroyed. He eventually finds work as a model.
- David Bannerman as Hamish McAlpine (series 1), one of Sheila's lodgers, who shares a room with Chris. Hamish is a flight attendant whose dream is to open a restaurant. Chris was initially under the impression that Hamish was gay, causing tension in their relationship.
- Carol Hawkins as Candy (series 2)
- Desmond McNamara as Frankie Lomax (series 2)

== Plot ==
Maureen Lipman played Sheila Haddon, whose husband had died 18 months before the start of the first series. He died without any insurance, so on top of her grief she has to pay off the mortgage of her house (No 20). To do this, rather than ask for help, she decides to take in young lodgers. Monica, her twenty-year-old student daughter, is asked to help. She brings back her fellow art student Carol, a doctor called Henry, as well as Chris, Hamish, Candy and Frankie. Sheila also gets many part-time jobs, while her old friend Richard Beamish proposes marriage to her.

== Episodes ==
=== Series One (1986) ===
No. overall	No. in series	Title	Directed by	Written by	Original release date
1	1	"All at No. 20"	Peter Frazer-Jones	Richard Ommanney	10 February 1986
Desperate to avoid bankruptcy, Sheila decides to sell her house. However, she cannot stand the potential buyers. When Chris, a recent arrival to London, arrives on her doorstep, needing a place to stay, Sheila decides to rent rooms to cover her overdraft. Meanwhile, Richard asks Sheila to read the latest volume of his memoirs, and Chris's van appears to have been stolen. Guest starring Chris Ellison as Mr Melchett and Sherrie Hewson as Mrs Melchett. Note: Martin Clunes does not appear in this episode.
2	2	"Episode 2"	Peter Frazer-Jones	Richard Ommanney	17 February 1986
Sheila presents her plan to rent rooms to her bank manager, but cannot stop laughing after she gets the advice to imagine him naked. When she exits the interview, she meets Henry, a medical student, who is looking for a room. Sheila takes him on as her third lodger. After two more potential lodgers take an interest in a room, Sheila decides to take Hamish in as a fourth, sharing with Chris. Chris puts together a flashy new suit to further his DJing career, but it is destroyed in a confrontation with Hell's Angels. Guest starring Terence Bayler as Mr Warren, and Marc Sinden as Mr Stokes.
3	3	"Episode 3"	Peter Frazer-Jones	Richard Ommanney	24 February 1986
Sheila loses her a part-time job as a secretary after destroying the quarterly accounts data in an attempt to learn how to use the word processor. To make ends meet, she asks Richard if she can type his latest manuscript, a potboiler. To improve Sheila’s productivity, Richard buys her a word processor. Chris dreads having to share his room with Hamish, whom he believes to be gay. Hamish, who is not gay, decides to prank Chris by playing along. Carol invites Henry on a date. Guest starring Delia Lindsay as Mrs Bagley, Jeremy Sinden as Mr Bagley, and Dorothea Phillips as Miss Godfrey.
4	4	"Episode 4"	Peter Frazer-Jones	Richard Ommanney	3 March 1986
Sheila collects the first rent from her new boarders, but still struggles to pay the bills. Chris’s van is due to be repossessed, so he tries to sell it to the housemates, with no success. Sheila and Richard fight about the word processor: Sheila hates it, Richard loves it, and the situation is not helped by Richard’s toothache. After paying the electricity bill with the money from her lodgers, Sheila cannot cover the payment on her bank loan. After considering selling a jardiniere given to her by her late husband to get the money, she decides to sell a brooch instead. As Chris and Sheila pull up to the bank in his van, Sheila’s bank manager pulls out, colliding with it. Because his van was destroyed, Chris can collect the insurance money. Sheila makes the payment on her loan. Richard apologizes to Sheila, who stops using the word processor. Guest starring Terence Bayler as Mr Warren, Sam Graham as the bank clerk, Harold Innocent as the antique store owner, and Eiji Kusuhara as the customer.
5	5	"Episode 5"	Peter Frazer-Jones	Richard Ommanney	10 March 1986
Sheila is busy looking for a job, so Angus promises to make dinner. However, the boarders are wary of his cooking. Chris needs to find a job, so he decides to apply to be a model. Sheila finds work transcribing a romance novel from an audio recording, but discovers that Richard paid the purported novelist to make a recording of herself reading an already-written novel, and engage Sheila to transcribe it. Hamish prepares a Scottish themed dinner, featuring, as its main dish, something called a “Highland hodge-podge”. Chris is engaged by a modeling agency. Richard shows up to the dinner in Highland dress. Hamish’s meal is enjoyed by all, except Chris. Sheila takes Richard to task for deceiving her. Chris, Hamish, and Monica fall asleep; Henry and Carol run off together; Richard and Sheila dance, and all is forgiven. Guest starring Patsy Smart as Millicent Bates.
6	6	"Episode 6"	Peter Frazer-Jones	Richard Ommanney	17 March 1986
Sheila and Richard go for a ride on his boat. During their walk on the riverfront, she helps him with his writer’s block. They run out of gas while Richard is proudly boasting about his naval accomplishments. When it emerges that he has planned the outing in order to propose to Sheila, she turns him down, saying that she isn't over her late husband. Carol makes multiple passes at Henry, but he ignores them. After making her way into his room, she finds a skeleton that he uses for his medical studies. He convinces her it’s his father’s skeleton, and she runs away. Carol tells Monica about the skeleton. When Monica confronts Henry, he says that he told Carol that to put her off, because he’s really interested in Monica. Monica and Henry go out for a walk in the park. Sheila tells Carol that the skeleton isn't Henry's father, it belongs to Henry's father. Carol catches Henry and Monica kissing. Monica and Carol fight, and then reconcile. Chris gets booked for a modeling job. Hamish gets a video recorder for the house. He records Casablanca, and has coincidentally recorded the commercial that Chris filmed for his job. It turns out that, in spite of his boasts of a sophisticated modeling experience, Chris has, instead, dressed as a duck to advertise a tabloid newspaper. Monica encourages Sheila to pursue a relationship with Richard.

=== Series Two (1987) ===
No. overall	No. in series	Title	Directed by	Written by	Original release date
7	1	"Now We Are Four"	Mark Stuart	Ian Davidson and Peter Vincent	27 October 1987
Now down to just one lodger (Henry), Sheila must find another. Henry has a crush on Monica, much to her annoyance. To help, Sheila manages to talk him out of it, but Henry then falls for Sheila. Richard writes to say that he has proposed to another woman.
8	2	"Three in a Bed"	Mark Stuart	Ian Davidson and Peter Vincent	3 November 1987
New lodger Candi moves in. Monica becomes jealous at the attention she gets from Sheila. In temper, Monica threatens to move out and to spend the night in a seedy bar. Sheila goes to rescue her but is arrested when the bar is raided by Police.
9	3	"My Kitten, Right Or Wrong?"	Mark Stuart	Ian Davidson and Peter Vincent	10 November 1987
Monica is depressed that none of her art college paintings have sold. Sheila secretly buys one, but Monica finds out and is furious. Meanwhile, a cat the housemates have adopted has kittens.
10	4	"Warts and All"	Mark Stuart	Ian Davidson and Peter Vincent	17 November 1987
Sheila is dreading an old schoolmate visiting as she has always been made feel inferior to her. On the day after a lot of panic, her husband shows up to say that she can't make it due to a migraine, but he tells her that she has always been jealous of Sheila.
11	5	"The Tea Leaf"	Mark Stuart	Alex Shearer	24 November 1987
In search of another lodger, Sheila decides to take in an ex-convict, Frankie. The others are not so happy about this, but soon warm to him.
12	6	"The Prowler"	Mark Stuart	Alex Shearer	1 December 1987
Alerted by a prowler outside, Sheila calls the Police. The Officer takes a shine to her and they go out on a date. Sheila finds him boring and tries to avoid him, but to her relief he tells her his estranged wife has returned. The prowler turns out to be a stray fox.

== DVD release ==
The Complete Series of All at No 20 was released by Network in the UK (Region 2) on 15 June 2015.
