= Jolyon Coy =

English actor, writer (born 1985)

- Born: 9 March 1985 (age 41); Hammersmith, London, England
- Education: London Academy of Music and Dramatic Art
- Occupation: Actor
- Years active: 2007–present
- Spouse: Blanche Schofield (m. 2015)
- Parent(s): Jonathan Coy; Louisa Rix
- Relatives: Jamie Rix (uncle); Brian Rix (grandfather); Elspet Gray (grandmother); Sheila Mercier (great-aunt); Richard Ommanney (stepfather)

Jolyon Coy (born 9 March 1985) is an English actor and writer.

== Theatre credits ==
- Toby Maitland in the premiere of POSH at the Royal Court.
- Pom in Our Boys at the Duchess Theatre.
- Alfred in Little Eyolf for Richard Eyre.
- Octavius in Anthony & Cleopatra and Gratiano in the Merchant Of Venice with Jonathan Pryce as Shylock at Shakespeare's Globe.
