= Daryl Goodrich =

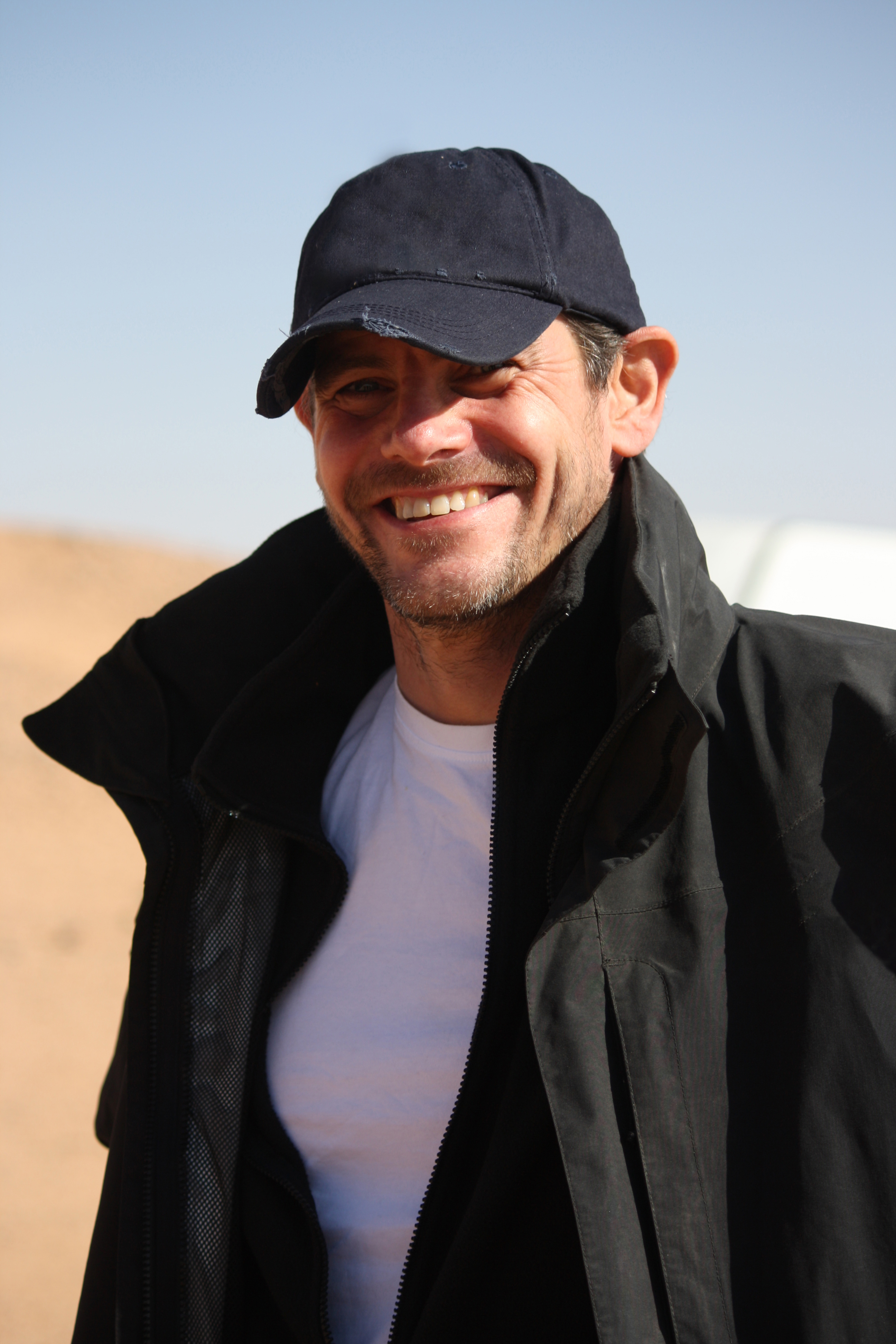
Daryl Goodrich

Daryl Goodrich is a British born director, filmmaker and motion graphic designer. Winner of the International Emmy Awards 2024 for his work as director on the Disney+ series 'Brawn: The Impossible Formula 1 Story'.

He has worked for major television networks specialising in sports production, and was responsible for producing the opening animations for the Olympic Games in Athens 2004, Vancouver 2010, London 2012, Sochi 2014, Rio 2016 and most recent Milano Cortina 2026 Winter games. He has also produced and directed sports documentaries features including Ferrari: Race to Immortality, True Grit and Make It or Die Trying – the Frank Warren Story, winner of best sports documentary of the year 2021.

== Early life ==
Born in Amersham, Buckinghamshire to parents Roy and Myra Goodrich, he is the second child of three, in between brothers Mark and Damon. He was raised in Yorkshire in the market town of Bingley, attending Ladderbanks Middle school in Baildon, then Salts Grammar school in Shipley, where his fascination with film and sports began. He subsequently attended Bradford College of Art and Design before studying graphic design and design communications at Suffolk Art College.

== Career ==
In 1988, Goodrich became a graphic designer for Cheerleader Productions responsible for design and motion graphics, covering all of their broadcast television shows including American Football and Sumo on Channel 4.

In 1994, he joined North One Television, formerly Chrysalis Television, as creative director. Goodrich was responsible for all the design and visual identity for their global television shows including Formula One for ITV for ten years, NBA and Football Italia on Channel 4, Rugby Special on BBC Two.

In 2004, Goodrich was commissioned to design and produce the opening animations for the World Television feed for Athens Olympic Games. Further commissions followed for Vancouver 2010 Winter Olympics, 2012 London Olympics.

Goodrich also won commissions for the 2014 Sochi Winter Olympics, the 2016 Rio Summer Games, and for Qatar on their successful campaign to host the 2022 World Cup.

Goodrich directed Make Britain Proud and Inspiration, two official London Olympic bid films that helped win the 2012 games. The winning film was noted for its powerful imagery and strong messaging. London Mayor Ken Livingstone said the film Inspiration 'won us the Olympics' and Goodrich was named among the top ten key players who helped London win the Games (The Observer, 10 July 2005).

Goodrich was commissioned to design and direct the Olympic film Inside The Race, a film exhibited at the Olympic museum in Lausanne, Switzerland. For the opening ceremony of the 2012 Paralympic Games Goodrich was commissioned by Channel 4 television to direct the story of 7/11 survivor Martine Wright The Journey.

Alongside his work as a creative director, Goodrich directs commercials as part of advertising campaigns for global brands. Clients include Adidas, British Airways, Coca-Cola, Sony, Emirates, Etihad Airways, Panasonic, Pepsi and Sony. In 2014, Goodrich left North One to establish his own creative agency, Dunlop Goodrich Creative.

Goodrich has directed various sport documentaries, including Diamonds and Tiaras for ITV, a behind-the-scenes look at David and Victoria Beckham World Cup party. In 2017, Goodrich directed the documentary feature film Ferrari: Race to Immortality released by Universal Pictures - described as "One of the best sporting films for years" by Rick Broadbent in The Times.

Goodrich followed this success with True Grit in 2018 for BT Sport Films, a film looking at the world of speedway, and described in The Daily Telegraph as "a powerful and sad story, bravely and sentimentally told".

In 2021, Daryl released his third major sports documentary Win or Die Trying – The Frank Warren Story which won 'best sports documentary of the year', likened by the Telegraph to a Guy Ritchie film.

In 2023, Daryl produced and directed the biopic documentary Sheene, his fourth major feature documentary release. Daryl was also commissioned as Series Director on a four part unscripted documentary series for Disney+ featuring Keanu Reeves, BrawnGP: The Impossible Formula One Story.

In 2024, Daryl won an International Emmy for Best Sports Documentary for Brawn: The Impossible Formula 1 Story.

In 2026, Daryl collaborated once again with Keanu Reeves, serving as Executive Producer and Creative Director on CADILLAC – INCEPTION, a four-part unscripted documentary series charting Cadillac's path to Formula One and its quest to earn a place on the grid of the world's premier motorsport championship.

== Filmography ==
As director
Year	Title	Distributor
2016	Ref - Stories from the Weekend	BT Sport Films
2017	Ferrari: Race to Immortality	Universal Pictures
2018	True Grit	BT Sport Films
2021	Win or Die Trying - The Frank Warren Story	BT Sport Films
2023	SHEENE	BT Sport Films
2023	BRAWN: The Impossible Formula 1 Story	Disney+

== Awards ==
- International Emmy 2024: 'Brawn: The Impossible Formula 1 Story'.
- Royal Television Society (RTS) judges award for contribution to the Sports Film and Television industry.
- The Olympic Films Inspiration and Sport at Heart won over 30 international awards between them, including the New York and IVCA Film Festivals.
- Grand Prix (Cannes Film Festival) awards and Cannes Golden Dolphin awards, 2019.
- Broadcast Sports Awards, best sports documentary of the year, 2021
