= Three Up, Two Down =

1985 British TV sitcom

- Genre: Sitcom
- Starring: Michael Elphick; Angela Thorne; Lysette Anthony; Ray Burdis
- Country of origin: United Kingdom
- Original language: English
- No. of series: 4
- No. of episodes: 25

Production
- Running time: 30 minutes

Original release
- Network: BBC1
- Release: 15 April 1985 – 18 June 1989

Three Up, Two Down is a British sitcom starring Michael Elphick and Angela Thorne which ran from 15 April 1985 to 18 June 1989. It was written by Richard Ommanney. The plot revolves around a stuck-up widow and a down-to-earth widower who share a flat and a grandchild, but have little in common.

== Cast ==
- Michael Elphick as Sam Tyler
- Angela Thorne as Daphne Trenchard
- Lysette Anthony as Angie Tyler (née Trenchard)
- Ray Burdis as Nick Tyler
- John Grillo as Wilf
- Neil Stacy as Major Giles Bradshaw
- Vicki Woolf as Rhonda (series 3 and 4)

== Plot ==
Nick and Angie have just had a baby, and to help them financially they decide to rent out the basement. Both Nick's father, Sam Tyler, and Angie's mother, Daphne Trenchard, want the basement apartment and the only solution is to share. Sam is a Cockney, while Daphne is Cheltenham-bred and has not forgiven her daughter for marrying Nick, a 'common' photographer. Both Sam and Daphne are widowed, and stubborn. There is mutual contempt between Nick and Daphne: however, Angie is fond of Sam and is forever trying, against all the odds, to keep the peace between him and Daphne. The situation is exacerbated, from Series Two onwards, by the presence of Sam's gloomy and pessimistic zoo-keeper friend Wilf Perkins, who, after being thrown out by his mother, ends up having to share Sam's room, much to Daphne's icy displeasure. Further complications arise through Daphne's brief and disastrous romance with a neighbour, the suave and crooked Major Giles Bradshaw, who is eventually sent to prison for acts of theft and fraud.

The comedy came from the clashes between Sam and Daphne, and the eventual romance that develops between them. The next-door neighbour, Rhonda, was a catalyst for bringing them together.

== Episodes ==
=== Series 1 (1985) ===
No. overall	No. in series	Title	Original release date
1	1	"Your Place or Mine?"	15 April 1985
2	2	"Widowers Mite"	22 April 1985
3	3	"Ill Wind from Cheltenham"	29 April 1985
4	4	"Epping's Not Far"	6 May 1985
5	5	"Just Desserts"	13 May 1985
6	6	"Two Down, One to Go"	20 May 1985

=== Series 2 (1986) ===
No. overall	No. in series	Title	Original release date
7	1	"Major Inconvenience"	7 April 1986
8	2	"Sweet and Sour"	14 April 1986
9	3	"Arrivals and Departures"	21 April 1986
10	4	"It's Only Rock and Roll"	28 April 1986
11	5	"Winner Takes All"	5 May 1986
12	6	"Ill Met By Candlelight"	12 May 1986

=== Series 3 (1987) ===
No. overall	No. in series	Title	Original release date
13	1	"Four's a Crowd"	6 September 1987
14	2	"One Flew Over the Perimeter Fence"	13 September 1987
15	3	"Truth and Consequences"	20 September 1987
16	4	"Mirror Mirror on the Wall"	27 September 1987
17	5	"Jailhouse Shock"	4 October 1987
18	6	"Come Sail with Me"	11 October 1987
19	7	"Life and Death"	18 October 1987

=== Series 4 (1989) ===
No. overall	No. in series	Title	Original release date
20	1	"Passionfruit"	14 May 1989
21	2	"On the Radio"	21 May 1989
22	3	"Omelettes and Optimism"	28 May 1989
23	4	"Golf"	4 June 1989
24	5	"The Driving Test"	11 June 1989
25	6	"Cheltenham"	18 June 1989

== American adaptation ==
The pilot for an American adaptation of Three Up, Two Down, titled 5 Up, 2 Down, aired on 5 June 1991 on CBS, but was not picked up as a series. Nick and Angie were played by Jeffrey D. Sams and Jackie Mari Roberts, and Angie had given birth to triplets. Sam and Daphne were played by Cleavon Little and Emily Yancy.

== Home video ==
VHS and DVD box sets of the first two series were released on Universal Pictures' Playback imprint in the UK on 17 May 2004. As of 2024, Series 3 and 4 still remain unreleased.
