= Like a Prayer =

Like a Prayer may refer to:

- Like a Prayer (album), a 1989 album by Madonna
  - "Like a Prayer" (song), a 1989 song by Madonna, title track of the album
- Like a Prayer, a 1991 documentary film by ACT UP, an AIDS advocacy organization
- "Like a Prayer", 2013 TV episode of Holby City
