= Gemma Wilde =

- Holby City character
- Ty Glaser as Gemma Wilde
- First appearance: "Push the Button (Part 2)"; 22 January 2013
- Last appearance: "Father's Day"; 17 December 2013
- Portrayed by: Ty Glaser

In-universe information
- Occupation: Foundation Training Year 2
- Children: Finn Wilde

Gemma Wilde is a fictional character from the BBC medical drama Holby City, played by actress Ty Glaser. She first appeared in the fifteenth series episode "Push the Button (Part 2)", broadcast on 22 January 2013. Gemma was introduced as an F1 doctor, but she eventually progressed to an F2 during her time in the show. Gemma was introduced along with fellow F1 Arthur Digby (Rob Ostlere). Glaser's casting was announced in October 2012. To help her prepare for the role of Gemma, Glaser visited Whipps Cross University Hospital where she shadowed a surgical team and worked with F1s.

Gemma was portrayed as being impulsive, driven, confident and focused on being a good doctor. Glaser also called Gemma ambitious and said wanted to be respected, regardless of her background. During her time in Holby City, Gemma struggled to balance her job as a doctor with motherhood, she was held hostage, had her career placed in jeopardy by another doctor and had a love-hate relationship with Harry Tressler (Jules Knight). Gemma also had to deal with the revelation of her "raunchy" alter-ego Dr. Honey, who was face of an online problem page. Gemma departed in the sixteenth series episode "Father's Day", which aired on 17 December 2013.

== Casting ==
On 24 October 2012, Daniel Kilkelly from Digital Spy confirmed actress Ty Glaser had joined the cast of Holby City as new regular doctor Gemma Wilde. Glaser had already begun filming at the show's studio in Borehamwood and her character made her first screen appearance on 22 January 2013. Glaser explained that she was in town when she learned she had won the role of Gemma. To help prepare for the role, Glaser visited Whipps Cross University Hospital with fellow cast member Rob Ostlere and they watched surgery being performed on a man with stomach cancer. They also shadowed a surgical team and worked with some F1 doctors, a registrar and a consultant.

== Development ==
=== Characterisation ===
Gemma is a naturally bright F1. She is tough, fierce, worldly-wise and doesn't suffer fools gladly but she is also a mother to a young son, Finn. Gemma does not let her parental responsibilities affect her career.

— BBC Online.

A BBC Online writer described Gemma as being "rash and impulsive". While Glaser said she was driven, "smart and quick and committed". Glaser liked that Gemma was good with her patients and that she was confident and focused on being a good doctor. She also thought Gemma's flaws were assuming that everyone was against her and jumping to conclusions. Glaser said she was not competitive as Gemma, but they were both ambitious and wanted to be respected despite their backgrounds. Glaser thought that Gemma's style was similar to her own casual style, saying that she often wore skinny jeans and T-shirts from British retailers Topshop and AllSaints. Glaser also loved wearing Gemma's scrubs, which she described as being "so comfortable" and said that was useful while she was filming for long periods of time.

Gemma is a single mother to Finn (Finley Barrett). Glaser explained that Gemma and her mother have a deal where she looks after Finn, while Gemma is at the hospital. The actress called it "a hardcore set up" and said Gemma was often pulled in different directions. She continued, "She wants to provide a better life for her son and to set a good example, working and achieving. She wants to prove to herself and her family she can do both." The BBC Online writer noted that Gemma was determined to be a good doctor and a good mother to Finn. Gemma's situation saw her juggling both her career and motherhood, but she often refused offers of help from others. When asked what viewers could look forward to with Gemma, Glaser replied "I think you will see her grow up a bit and have to deal with some pretty tricky situations. She’s a tough one though, she'll fight her way through."

=== Career at Holby ===
Gemma joined Holby City Hospital as an F1 doctor, along with Arthur Digby (Ostlere). Gemma was assigned to AAU under the watch of Michael Spence (Hari Dhillon). It was not long before Gemma was recognised by a patient as her internet alter ego Dr. Honey. Glaser told Melanie Hancill from The People that it was something Gemma did when she was younger and in financial trouble. The actress continued, "She was a single mum who could do with a bit of extra cash coming in and she was offered a lot of money to be the face of an online problem page. She didn't realise quite what was expected of her – a revealing photoshoot!" While Gemma did not want anything more to do with her alter ego, it was difficult to get away from because it remained on the internet. Glaser thought that Gemma felt undermined by the whole thing and she was worried that her colleagues would judge her for her past.

While Gemma competed with Arthur for the same position within the hospital, she also competed with her friend Mary-Claire Carter (Niamh McGrady) for Harry Tressler's (Jules Knight) affections. McGrady believed there would be "some friction" between Gemma and Mary-Claire, but said they had a good working relationship. Not long after arriving at Holby, Gemma was involved in a hostage situation. She and a female patient named Kelly (Alexia Healy) were confronted by Kelly's estranged husband Dean Delaney (Dean Ashton), who barricaded himself in a room with them. Dean was suffering from post-traumatic stress disorder and was convinced the hospital was under attack. Gemma found herself in a "terrifying position" and when Kelly's condition deteriorated, Gemma had to act fast to save her.

Gemma's career was placed in jeopardy when Oliver Valentine (James Anderson) lied about his mistreatment of a patient. Harry tried to stand up for Gemma and take control of the situation. Glaser asserted that Gemma wanted to sort things out by herself because Harry did not know what exactly had happened with the patient. Glaser also thought Gemma would be annoyed to learn that Harry had stepped in to try to defend her. Oliver later admitted that he was to blame for putting the patient's life at risk and cleared Gemma's name. Glaser told Inside Soap's Katy Moon that Gemma had had a bad time and nothing had come easy to her, so she was delighted when Serena Campbell (Catherine Russell) informed her that she would be allowed to progress to the next level of her career. Glaser expressed her surprise that Gemma still wanted to be a doctor after all that had happened to her.

=== Relationship with Harry Tressler ===
When asked if there were plans to give Gemma a love interest, Glaser mentioned new character, Harry Tressler (Knight), who was about to be introduced and said he had "a twinkle in his eye". However, the actress was unaware if something was going to happen between Gemma and Harry. She continued, "I don't know whether for his character it means anything as it does to Gemma. And if she keeps to herself, workwise I don't know if she has enough time. Casual relationships are not really her thing!" Glaser thought a relationship would be fun to portray and that it would show a new side to Gemma. Gemma initially mistook Harry for a psychiatric consultant, but he later impressed her when he solved a puzzling case. Knight described Gemma and Harry's relationship as "love-hate" with a lot of game playing. Gemma and Harry later shared a kiss, but Glaser reckoned that romance was the last thing on Gemma's mind. She also called Harry "a bit of a player" and did not think Gemma would enter into a relationship unless she was sure about it, as she had her career and her son to think about. Glaser also stated that the kiss with Harry was "a silly thing to do in hindsight", especially when he did not seem interested in her afterwards.

=== Departure ===
On 28 August 2013, it was announced that Glaser would be leaving Holby City later that year, along with several other actors. In a statement, Glaser said "I've had such a wonderful time working on Holby, the cast and crew have all been exceptional, a joy to work with. I'm beyond excited about future projects ahead of me but will always remember Holby as a fantastic year in my career." Executive producer Oliver Kent praised the actors and their "unforgettable characters". Gemma departed during the sixteenth series episode "Father's Day", which aired on 17 December 2013.

== Reception ==
Jane Simon, writing for the Daily Mirror, noted that Gemma was humiliated about her "saucy past as Dr Honey". A BBC Media Centre writer branded Gemma "feisty". Katy Moon from Inside Soap observed that "sparks fly" between Gemma and Harry. Simon (Daily Mirror) was devastated to learn that Gemma and three others would be leaving Holby City. She was worried when she saw Gemma in bomb disposal gear, but quipped "Don't worry – they're not planning a mass exodus.
