= Paul Shelley =

English actor

- Born: Paul Matthews; 15 May 1942 (age 84); Leeds, England
- Education: RADA
- Occupation: Actor
- Years active: 1968–present
- Spouse(s): Eileen Nicholas (divorced); Paula Stockbridge
- Children: 2
- Relatives: Francis Matthews (brother)

Paul Shelley (born Paul Matthews; 15 May 1942) is an English actor.

Shelley was born in Leeds, West Riding of Yorkshire, and trained at RADA (Royal Academy of Dramatic Art). Since then he has mainly worked in the theatre as a classical actor. He has worked extensively with the Royal National Theatre and the Royal Shakespeare Company and has appeared in several West End productions.

== Television and film roles ==
His work for television includes A Tale of Two Cities (1980), the BBC Sunday classic serial in which he played the dual lead roles of Charles Darnay and Sydney Carton, Secret Army (1978–79) as Major Nicholas Bradley, The Fourth Arm (1979), Special Branch (1974), Blake's 7 (1979), Doctor Who (1982), Inspector Morse (1990), Paradise Postponed (1986) based on book by John Mortimer (audiobook-recorded by Paul Shelley as well) and its sequel Titmuss Regained (1991, also audiobook), Revelations (1994–95), Heartbeat (2002) and Crossroads (2003). In the popular ITV detective drama Midsomer Murders episode "The Creeper" (2009) Shelley performed as Inspector Barnaby's boss, Chief Constable Richard Lovell and appeared as Jed Grey in several episodes in BBC TV series Doctors (2010).

Films include Oh! What a Lovely War (1969), Polanski's Macbeth (1971), It Shouldn't Happen to a Vet (1976) and God's Outlaw (1986).

== Theatre roles ==
Shelley played Duncan in Rupert Goold's production of Macbeth ("the Macbeth of a lifetime" according to critics) which after its sellout runs at Chichester Festival Theatre in summer 2007 was transferred to the West End in the autumn and then to New York from February to May 2008. During the Chichester season 2007 he also played Sir Toby Belch in Twelfth Night.

Other notable roles are: at Shakespeare's Globe: Julius Caesar (title role), Antony in Antony and Cleopatra, three Tom Stoppard plays in the West End The Invention of Love (Oscar Wilde), Arcadia (Bernard), The Real Thing (Henry), at Royal National Theatre: The Secret Rapture (Tom French), Hedda Gabler (Tesman), The Crucible (Hale), Lady in the Dark (Kendal), at Royal Shakespeare Company: Romeo and Juliet (Tybalt), King Lear (Edmund), The Winter’s Tale (Leontes), Troilus and Cressida (Achilles), Les liaisons dangereuses (Valmont). Shelley has also often worked at the Orange Tree Theatre in Richmond, as an actor and director, on such plays as Uncle Vanya and King Lear. For nine months he played Arthur Kipps in the thriller The Woman in Black at the Fortune Theatre (2006–07).

Shelley played Elyot Chase in Noël Coward's Private Lives at the Theatre Royal, York and returned there to direct Robert Bolt's A Man For All Seasons, in June 2008. He played the Duke of Norfolk in A Man For All Seasons, on tour and at the Haymarket in 2005-06. In a Donmar Warehouse production of T.S. Eliot's The Family Reunion he played Colonel Gerald Piper in a run from November 2008 to January 2009. At York's Theatre Royal from 30 May-20 June 2009 Paul played Max in Harold Pinter's The Homecoming. A Voyage Around My Father, by John Mortimer, with Paul Shelley playing the Father, was a Salisbury Playhouse production in autumn 2010. Rose Theatre, Kingston in March 2011 showed Shakespeare's As You Like It with Paul Shelley in the dual roles of Duke Frederick and Duke Senior. After that he played Ralph in Harold Pinter's 'Moonlight' at the Donmar Warehouse. "Earthquakes in London" by Mike Bartlett and directed by Rupert Goold was on UK tour until 12 November 2011 with Paul Shelley as the father, Robert. In June 2012 the Orange Tree Theatre showed The Conquering Hero with Paul Shelley as Colonel Rokeby. He played Andrew in Mike Bartlett's adaptation of "Medea" on tour until December 2012. Produced by Headlong. Theatre Royal Bath showed "King Lear" in July–August 2013 with Paul as the Earl of Gloucester. From 21 January to 8 February 2014 the Lyceum Theatre, Edinburgh staged Eugene O'Neill's Long Day's Journey into Night, with Paul playing the father, James Tyrone. "Brideshead Revisited" on UK tour April–June 2016 with Paul as Lord Marchmain.

== Audiobooks ==
He is also an audiobook narrator and has recorded some thirty audiobooks, among them John Fowles’ The French Lieutenant’s Woman, Kingsley Amis’ Lucky Jim, several of Robert Goddard's novels, James Cameron's An Indian Summer, Nicholas Crane's Two Degrees West and Staying On by Paul Scott. He has been called "the best reader there is" and has three times won the Audiofile Earphones Award.

== Personal life ==
Paul Shelley has toured and taught at universities in the USA. He is married to actress Paula Stockbridge and has a son and daughter from his previous marriage to actress Eileen Nicholas. His elder brother Francis Matthews was also an actor, as was sister Maura Matthews.

== Theatre ==
Year	Title	Role	Company	Director |	Notes
2012	Medea	Andrew	Citizens Theatre, Glasgow	Mike Bartlett	
2014	Long Day's Journey into Night	James Tyrone	Lyceum Theatre, Edinburgh	Tony Cownie	
2016	Brideshead Revisited	Lord Marchmain & Mr Ryder	Theatre Royal, Brighton	Damian Cruden	

== Filmography ==
=== Film ===
Year	Title	Role	Notes
1969	Oh! What a Lovely War	Jack Henry Smith	
1971	Macbeth	Donalbain	
1976	It Shouldn't Happen to a Vet	Richard Carmody	
1985	Lace II	Christopher Swann	TV movie
1986	God's Outlaw	John Frith	
1997	Caught in the Act	Neville Goodenough	DTV movie
2001	On Wings of Fire	King Vishtaspa	
2010	Great Performances	Duncan	Macbeth
2021	My Old Man	Michal	Short

=== Television ===
Year	Title	Role	Notes
1968	Nicholas Nickleby	Frank Cheeryble	TV series
1968	ITV Playhouse	Jack Sheppard	Two episodes
1969	The Mind of Mr. J.G. Reeder	Constable Burnett	Episode: "The Poetical Policeman"
1970	Wicked Women	Alfred Brierly	Episode: "Florence Maybrick"
1970	The Borderers	William Ker	Episode: "Where The White Lilies Grow"
1970	Hark at Barker	Hero	Episode: "Rustless on Music"
1970	ITV Playhouse	The Count	Episode: "The Style of the Countess"
1972	Man at the Top	Mike Slater	TV series
1973	The Pathfinders	Flight Lt. Tony Hurst	Episode: "Nightmare"
1973	New Scotland Yard	Kenny Aldridge	Episode: "Diamonds Are Never Forever"
1974	Special Branch	Palliser	Episode: "Jailbait"
1975	Churchill's People	Norman man-at-arms	Episode: "Silver Giant, Wooden Dwarf"
1978	The Comedy of Errors	Ephesus Townsperson	TV movie
1978	Accident	Eddie Knight	Episode: "Purple One"
1978-1979	Secret Army	Major Nicholas Bradley	TV series
1979	The Fourth Arm	Major Hugh Gallagher	TV series
1979	A Man Called Intrepid	Bo	TV series
1979	Blake's 7	Major Provine	Episode: "Countdown"
1979-1980	Turtle's Progress	Alex Corton	TV series
1980	Breakaway	Peter Bradford	Episodes: "The Family Affair"
1980	A Tale of Two Cities	Sydney Carton/Charles Darnay	TV series
1981	When the Boat Comes In	Bauer	Episode: "Flies and Spiders"
1981	Guerre en pays neutre	David	TV miniseries
1982	Doctor Who	Persuasion	Episodes: "Four to Doomsday"
1986	Paradise Postponed	Fred Simcox	TV series
1990	Inspector Morse	Stephen Radford	Episode: "The Sins of the Fathers"
1991	Titmuss Regained	Dr Fred Simcox	TV series
1992	The Good Guys	Graham Hedley	Episode: "Relative Values"
1993	Soldier Soldier	Lt Col Horwood	Episode: "Base Details"
1994	The 10 Percenters	Aubrey	Episode: "Galaxy Quest 8"
1994-1995	Revelations	Edward Rattigan	TV series
1995	99-1	Rappaport	Episode: "The Lost Ones"
1996	In Suspicious Circumstances	George Storrs	Episode: "The Golden Goose"
1997	Frighteners	Bill Turner	Episode: "Rose Cottage"
2002	Heartbeat	Ralph Harrison	Episode: "A Girl's Beat Friend"
2003	Dot the i	Presenter	
2003	Crossroads	Stafford Wynter	
2005	Doctors	Alan Bellamy	Episode: "Home Front"
2009	Midsomer Murders	CC Richard Lovell	Episode: "The Creeper"
2010–2012	Doctors	Jed Grey	Recurring role
2010	Great Performances	Duncan	Macbeth
2017	Midsomer Murders	Walter Oswood	Episode: "Death by Persuasion"
