= Dominic Copeland =

Fictional general surgeon in BBC TV medical drama Holby City

- Holby City character
- David Ames as Dominic Copeland
- First appearance: "Second Life"; 23 April 2013
- Last appearance: "Episode 1102"; 29 March 2022
- Portrayed by: David Ames

In-universe information
- Occupation: Consultant general surgeon; Clinical lead (Keller); (prev. Clinical registrar, CT2 doctor, CT1 doctor, F2 doctor, F1 doctor)
- Family: Ange Godard (mother); Barry Copeland (adoptive father); Carole Copeland (adoptive mother); Chloe Godard (half-sister); Isabella "Izzy" Hudson (half-sister); Alistair Hudson (half-brother)
- Spouse: Lofty Chiltern (2018−)
- Significant others: Kyle Greenham; Lee Cannon; Isaac Mayfield

Dominic "Dom" Copeland is a fictional character from the BBC medical drama Holby City, played by actor David Ames. He first appeared in the series fifteen episode "Second Life", broadcast on 23 April 2013. Dom arrives at Holby City hospital as an F1 on Keller Ward being mentored by Antoine Malick (Jimmy Akingbola) and later Sacha Levy (Bob Barrett). The character was originally introduced for several episodes and featured in a storyline with Malick. Producers later decided to reintroduce the character on a permanent basis with Dom returning in January 2014.

Dom is a complex character who enjoys causing trouble and creating different personalities to suit his desired outcome of a situation. His manipulative behaviour has seen him lie under oath and attempt to ruin his colleagues careers. His reintroduction signalled a rivalry with Arthur Digby (Rob Ostlere) and a friendship with Zosia March (Camilla Arfwedson). He goes on to develop a close friendship with Arthur that proves significant to his character development. Writers also made changes to his personality by placing Dom alongside senior staff with "strong moral compasses" who help him to become a "better person". The character shares romantic relationships with agency nurse Kyle Greenham (Alan Morrisey) and patient Lee Canon (Jamie Nichols). The latter subjects him to a violent attack which affects his career at the hospital.

Writers carried on victimising the character when they paired him with registrar Isaac Mayfield (Marc Elliott). Their relationship was used to portray domestic abuse within a gay relationship. The story culminated with Dom leaving Isaac and exposing his abuse. Dom was left with a steroid addiction and severe trust issues. His next relationship was developed with nurse Lofty Chiltern (Lee Mead), which results in a doomed marriage. Holby City producer Kate Hall felt it was important because Dom had been emotionally damaged and could not move on quickly. Writers continued to create dramatic stories for the character when he contracts Hepatitis C from a needle stick injury. Producers later rewrote the character's back story which reveals he was adopted and introduced his biological mother Ange Godard (Dawn Steele). Critic Anthony D. Langford from TheBacklot.com has often praised the character for not being stereotypical, while other reviews have labelled him "bad" and "sneaky".

== Development ==
=== Casting, characterisation and family ===
Ames had previously auditioned for a different character but was unsuccessful. Gaining the role of Dominic meant a lot to Ames' family who were already Holby City fans.

Troubled and trouble in equal measure, Dom’s a wily schemer who is always working an angle. Intelligent and sharp-witted, he’s actually very sensitive and is easily wounded, often believing himself to be the victim and justifying his actions as self-defence. Fiercely protective of, and generous towards, those he favours, Dom can also be surly and vindictive towards those he feels have betrayed him. When it comes to fact versus fiction, Dom prefers to glamorise.

— BBC Online.

Dom is billed as "complicated, unpredictable and deliciously wicked". His manipulative persona is said to make the show more interesting. Career wise Dom is incredibly ambitious. But he is untruthful and has "demons" from past experiences that continue to trouble him. Ames called him a "scheming, cheeky little mongrel" and finds fun in playing the nasty character. He told Lorraine Kelly that "Dominic is a very complex character and he has a lot to prove and he doesn't really hold back on how he goes about doing that." Ames believed that there are similarities between him and Dom. He told a reporter from Gay Times that "as a gay man playing a gay man, there’s definitely an element of myself in Dominic’s personality, because one thing I wanted to do with Dominic is to have fun with him."

The character goes on a journey emotionally and through his career at Holby City his personality changes. Ames assessed that originally his character had "questionable morals and standards". But being around senior hospital staff with "such strong moral compasses" he finds a "good path". Through these connections writers developed him into a "better person, a better colleague and a better friend." In 2017, Ames assessed that the character is "so full of bravado, he is very cocky and he is very full of himself". But Ames also likened his character to someone wearing a mask. When his "mask slips sometimes" and you learn that Dom "is vulnerable and underneath it all he is quite scared and timid." The actor concluded that he was still fascinated by his complex character.

In 2015, Julia Deakin was hired to play Dom's mother Carole Copeland. She was described by a writer from Inside Soap as being the "overenthusiastic parent" of her "beloved boy" Dom. She likes to know all of his business and wants to be close to him again. With this Carole secures a job at the hospital cafe. When Carole hears gossip about her son, she confronts him on Keller ward in front of patients. Dom is "mortified" by his mother and they have an "embarrassing row" on the ward. The incident also causes Dom to behave unprofessionally with a patient. Dom has to tell his mother to "mind her own business for once".

=== Guest role and return ===
Dom arrives on Keller Ward while Antoine Malick (Jimmy Akingbola) is in charge. Dom sleeps with Malick, but he is in a relationship with Nathan Hargreave (Jotham Annan). Malick treats infamous serial killer, Amanda Layton (Ruth Gemmell). He grants her wish to not resuscitate after she tells him the location of her final victim. But he finds himself in trouble and the matter gets taken to court. When Malick rejects Dominic's further advances he wants revenge. Malick is questioned over the DNR and expects Dom to validate his statement. Dom uses the opportunity to get Malick in further trouble over the incident. Ames believed that Dom was under much "psychological stress" at this point.

Dom then proceeds to lie under oath to further enact his revenge. Dom claims that Malick delivered Amanda a fatal overdose. To defend himself he is forced to admit that he kissed Dom. Akingbola told a reporter from Inside Soap that "Dominic's crush rebounds on Malick, Nathan has been a rock to him, and now Malick worries that he'll lose the love of his life as well as his job." Ames told a reporter from BBC Online that it was Dom's "inexperience and naivety" that got him in to deep with Malick. But Dom's lies at the coroner's inquest are exposed and he leave Holby City shamed. Ames summed up the departure as Dom leaving the show disgracefully under a cloud.

In September 2013, it was announced that Ames had reprised the role. Executive producer Oliver Kent said that his return would "definitely shake things up at Holby City". Ames told a TV Choice reporter that "Dominic is definitely going to spice things up and he's someone who is going to cause a lot of sparks." Dom returned during the episode titled "Intuition", broadcast on 14 January 2014. He "skulked off with his tail between his legs" when he left the hospital shamed. But he returns to try again but this time remain focused on his career. He also damaged his emotional wellbeing in addition to his career. Lying to the jury delivered a "massive blow" to his life and he struggled to regain respect. Ames believed that his character had learned a "valuable lesson" and that Dom would use it to better himself. He warned that while Dom would not be predictable he remained as untrustworthy as ever. Dom will do "whatever it takes" to appear better at everything tries.

=== F1 repeat ===
Dom's return to Keller Ward means that he has to contend with F2 doctor Arthur Digby (Rob Ostlere). Malick and Arthur were close colleagues so his return inevitably causes friction. Ames explained that "Dom has a long way to go before Arthur even begins to consider them equals, let alone friends. Arthur is a faithful old Labrador." Arthur wants to expose Dom to registrar and mentor Sacha Levy (Bob Barrett). Ostlere told Kelly that Arthur "is very suspicious about Dominic but he cannot convince Sasha." Sacha believes they are working well together, but this is due to Dom behaving in a manipulative manner. He fakes multiple personas and uses them to suit a desired outcome. Ames namely described a "butter wouldn't melt" attitude shown while in Sacha's presence.

Dom is aware that forming a working relationship with Arthur will be difficult; so he decides to have fun creating tension. Ames told a reporter from What's on TV that "there’s clearly a lot of friction between them and Dom likes to push Arthur's buttons, not least just to entertain himself." One example of Dom and Arthur's rivalry occurs while treating a patient involved in a factory explosion. Sacha places Arthur in charge of Keller and Dom uses the opportunity to make Arthur appear unable to manage the situation. Ames said "Dominic will put his own job above anyone else's job. He'll say whatever needs to be said in order to better himself and his career."

Holby City quickly developed a "best friend" partnership between Dom and fellow F1 Zosia March (Camilla Arfwedson). Arthur warns Zosia about Dom's past. But she takes no notice of Arthur's concerns, befriends him and asks him to move in with her. A What's on TV reporter observed that Dom's "bad boy reputation" managed to impress Zosia. Dom later creates a false account of his mother's supposed death and Arthur exposes his lies. But Zosia is not fazed by the revelation. Jane Simon of the Daily Mirror noted that Dom being a sociopath only served to make him more interesting to the aspiring psychiatrist Zosia. He sees his friendship with Zosia as part of creating his new life. Ames said that they have a "different dynamic" compared to his other working relationships. Ames opined that gay men are often attracted to strong independent women and Zosia is very ambitious. It was therefore a natural development that Dom gravitated towards her. Zosia's interest in psychiatrics means that she likes to observe Dom. But Ames believed that the duo "equally intrigue each other". Dom, Arthur and Zosia were often featured in storylines together and formed a best friend group. In 2015, Producer Simon Harper decided to split up the trio having Dom staying on Keller, Zosia moving to Darwin and Arthur working on AAU. Harper said it was a difficult decision to make and it was discussed at length with executive producer Oliver Kent. But Harper wanted to tell stories reflecting real medical careers. He noted that "as they mature and progress, [they] would go on to their separate disciplines and wards [...] What's great about the changes is that gives them different stories."

=== Friendship with Arthur Digby ===
Despite initially being enemies the pair go on to forge a close friendship. In one storyline Dom's father is homophobic and tries to embarrass his son in-front of an audience inside a holiday club. Arthur defends his friend by kissing him on the lips as a showing of support. This led viewers to suspect the show was developing a romance between the two character. But Harper later stated that there were no plans and branded it a "beautiful gesture in support of his gay mate" to challenge homophobia. Ostlere called it a "show of solidarity" and described the pair as "very close friends". He was also glad writers did not develop their friendship into anything more. They were friends without worrying what their sexuality, "It was a really honest portrayal of two friends." Ames viewed it as a "very beautiful bromance". He also praised the realism of gay males having straight male friends. The actor concluded "as a gay man myself, it's always very nice when you have those straight friends who are so beyond comfortable with you that they can act in ways that other people would perhaps question."

The pair were unlikely friends who would "gripe and moan and bitch at each other." He was the best friend that Dom has been searching for, something he had never had before. Ames believed Dom "genuinely felt love and affection" towards Arthur. Dom lives his life in fear of losing people and Arthur is one of the rare examples that the character decided to get close to.

Arthur is diagnosed with terminal cancer. Ames said that Arthur's illness "hit Dom very hard". He tries his best to be there and support Arthur. He later dies from the illness and Dom is left to grieve for his best friend. Ames explained that his character tends to suppress his feelings in turmoil. He reverts to old habits and behaviour that made him unpopular in the hospital. He becomes "very emotionally cut off" refusing to cry and furiously argues with colleagues during a "tumultuous time". Ames concluded that Arthur was Dom's friendly "soul mate". He was "someone who didn't quite fit in, in the same way as Dominic doesn't. They were an unlikely pairing and it's a struggle for him to get over the fact he's lost that."

=== Relationship with Lee Cannon ===
Following a brief relationship with agency nurse Kyle Greenham (Alan Morrisey), which was ruined by Dom's untruthfulness, Dom later begins to date a patient named Lee Canon (Jamie Nichols), who was admitted to Keller with bowel cancer. Despite undergoing a successful operation, Dom was forced to tell Lee that another tumour had been found. Lee came to rely on Dom's commitment to him and they shared "a warm moment". Holby City producer Harper named it a "huge story" for Dom, which "ultimately tests his relationship with Arthur". A reporter from the Daily Mirror warned viewers that disappoint would lie ahead for Dom. Dom soon believes that he may have a future with Lee. But he cons Dom and steals from his flat and disappears from his life. Ames told a What's on TV reporter that believed he had found "the one" and felt feelings he had not before. The feelings "probably felt a lot like first love" which was "very intoxicating" and "incredibly attached" to Lee in a short period of time. Ames defended his character adding "I suppose he got swept up in the excitement of it all." Following the robbery Dom is ashamed because he allowed the relationship to develop quick without knowing much about Lee. A preview trailer released via the show's official website revealed that Dom would be attacked by Lee when he returned.

After time off-screen Lee was reintroduced alongside his wife Alison Jones (Elizabeth Cadwallader) who is pregnant. Ames said that Dom is "absolutely dumbfounded", angry and confused because he had genuine feelings for Lee. But he has "the gall" to arrive at Dom's place of work with Alison knowing that he will be working on the ward. Lee warns Dom to keep their affair a secret and is in denial about his sexuality. Dom builds a rapport with Alison and does not want her to feel cheated by Lee like he was. But Alison is not fooled and acknowledges that Lee has had affairs with many men and ends her relationship. Lee is angry and confronts Dom feeling he is to blame. Ames explained that his character "doesn't hold back in telling Lee that he’s a liar, a fraud and someone who has affairs with men." Dom's truthful tirade enthrals Lee who then lunges at Dom and begins a violent attack. Ames said Lee's anger stemmed "out of frustration over not being able to control who he is". Ric Griffin (Hugh Quarshie) tries to intervene in the fight and Lee picks up a knife. They battle to retrieve the weapon from Lee but in the struggle Dom stabs Lee. The police are satisfied that Dom acted in self-defence and clear him of any charges. But Lee makes an official complaint and the hospital are forced to investigate.

In the months that follow the attack Dom struggles at work. Ames assessed that the medic is "still trying to make his peace with what happened." He distracts himself from the issue and realises that he needs to focus on work. Through this he is able to regain some normality. Alison is later admitted to Keller ward with complications in her pregnancy. Her presence makes his encounter with Lee "all very fresh in Dom's mind again". He tries to avoid treating Alison but then decides to deal with the situation. Alison asks for Dom's help to visit Lee and rebuild her family. He wants to know how Lee is but cannot face him. He is annoyed at Alison for relying on him to sort out her marriage. Ames explained that Dom decides to help Alison move on. He tells her that she cannot hold onto the past, advice Dom decides to act on and forget about Lee. The actor added that the story gave Dom "an element of closure" over Lee.

=== Domestic abuse ===
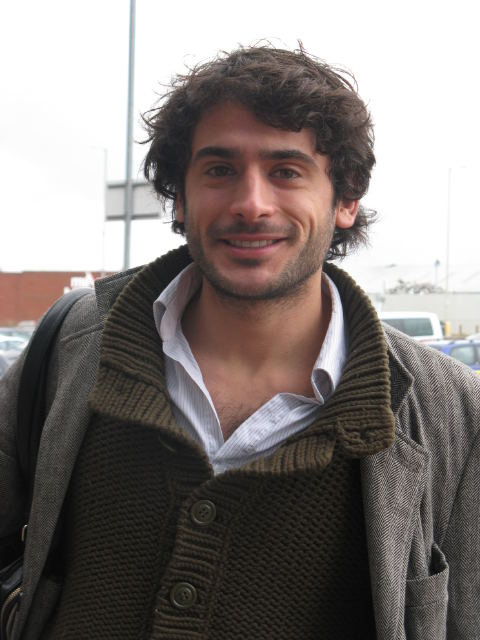
Marc Elliott plays Dom's violent partner Isaac Mayfield

Writers later paired Dom in a romantic relationship with new registrar Isaac Mayfield (Marc Elliott). Over the course of the relationship it becomes problematic and Isaac turns violent and controlling towards Dom. A substantial amount of the physical abuse was not aired in episodes. The violence occurred off-screen and Elliot believed that the pre-watershed time slot played a role in this. Plus he did not believe the audience would want to see such high levels of violence each week. The story did include the element of emotional abuse, but only in one very violent scene did they depict Dom being attacked by Issac. It also helped to portray that such domestic violence usually occurs behind closed doors and the victim covers for their abuser. Ames said that the story showed "how easy it is to fall into that trap and how blindly you can wonder into it" because of love.

The emotional abuse began soon into their relationship. Dom was emotionally vulnerable still grieving over the death of his best friend. Elliot believed that "Isaac got him in his clutches when he was particularly weak, extremely malleable and easy to manipulate." The actor stated that the story is "twisted" as his character embarks on a pattern of controlling behaviour and tells lies to manipulate Dom. Issues arise because Isaac wants Dom "dangling on a string" and his "reason for wanting to destroy Dom is simply because he can." But Isaac begins to lose control of Dom when he stands up to him and announces that he is going to live with Zosia. This was the point writers introduced violence into the story. It had just been "very emotional and very psychological" but Dom's defiance worries Isaac and stirs up anger. Isaac thinks the only way to break Dom into submission is to attack him. Filming the brutal attack required Ames to have a cushion underneath his attire so that Elliot could kick him in the stomach. The fight scene was so aggressive that Holby City's post-production had to edit out distressing sounds from the attack. The actors did not enjoy filming multiple takes as Ames had to drop to the floor repeatedly for the scenes.

Dom addresses Isaac's temper but he refuses to admit he has a problem. Elliot told Victoria Wilson from What's on TV that his character is a classic sociopath and does not want to hear that he has done wrong. The actor firmly believed that Isaac does not love Dom. He explained that the relationship is a "nasty and devious game" and he lacks empathy. He added "that's why he’s able to be as cruel as he is to Dom without caring in the slightest because there's no emotional attachment to Dom whatsoever." He just wanted to "loved and be adored" by Dom without returning the sentiment.

When Dom's ex-boyfriend Kyle is admitted as a patient, Isaac becomes annoyed at their shared past. The character is not jealous but does view Kyle as a threat. Elliot said that Issac thinks Kyle is an "obstacle" and feels the need to isolate Dom and gain "full power over him". He concluded that it becomes about "competitiveness and one-upmanship". The relationship comes to an end when Dom falls down the stairs during an altercation. Writers chose not to include Isaac pushing Dom. Elliot explained that his character is so " threatening, intimidating and menacing" towards Dom that pure fear causes him to fall down the stairway. Dom reports Isaac to the hospital management and he is suspended thus the character being written out of the show. Isaac later contacts Dom but he refuses to speak to him and reports him to the authorities.

Elliot reprised the role two years later as writers decided to revisit the story. Isaac returns when Dom contacts him following personal problems. When Isaac's father is admitted to hospital, Dom takes control of the case. He discovers that Isaac may have become violent as a result of the upbringing Jon provided. Dom and Isaac share a kiss despite their troubled past. Elliot told a reporter from What's on TV that was still "sexual tension" and "unresolved feelings" between them. He added that Isaac is "alluring" and "it's a tricky thing for Dom to shake off those feelings which really confuse him." The story culminates in Isaac scheming and attacking Dom's new husband, Lofty Chiltern (Lee Mead). Lofty is rushed to an operating theatre for life saving surgery and Isaac is arrested for his latest crimes.

=== Relationship with Lofty Chiltern ===
Producers created a new friendship for Dom when they introduced Lofty. When he arrives to work on Keller to work as a nurse, the pair do not like each other. Mead told Emma Bullimore (TVTimes) that Dom has a "frosty side" which he displays when Lofty annoys him. He told Digital Spy's Sophie Dainty that "I think Dom is a strong character and he just can't work out Lofty." Dom cannot believe that Lofty is as nice as he appears. He initially finds him "quite odd and not genuine". Mead added that once Dom better understood Lofty's personality he starts to like him. Dom begins to feel low and takes steroids to make himself feel more confident. Dom begins to behave in an erratic manner and a concerned Lofty informs Sacha. When Lofty learns about Isaac's abuse he offers his support to Dom. Lofty then discovers steroids in Dom's bag and confronts him. He stresses the poor health implications they cause which prompts Dom to deny he has a steroid addiction. Dom and Lofty begin to establish a friendship. Mead told Wilson (What's on TV) that it would be interesting watching their dynamic develop further.

Holby City series producer Kate Hall revealed that their friendship would develop into a love story. She stated "It's gorgeous, measured, not rushed and it's respectful of the fact that Dominic has been so badly damaged by Isaac. It's a story about resilience and kindness from Lofty towards Dom." When Sacha accidentally reveals that Lofty is gay, Dom begins to wonder if there is an attraction between them. Mead explained that they had become firm friends and when Lofty buys tickets for a show, Dom thinks it is a date. He tries to kiss Lofty who does not reciprocate. Mead later told Tyler (Inside Soap) that Lofty was shocked by Dom being so forward because he had not noticed his attraction. He turned him down on that basis only, but feels jealous when Dom begins to date Freddie Chapel (Aaron Fontaine). Lofty decides to keep his feelings for Dom a secret. Mead believed this was because Lofty had become "quite protective" of Dom and did not want to complicate their friendship. He added "Lofty doing a U-turn after initially rejecting Dom hasn't helped the situation." When a car accident occurs at a charity race Freddie is injured but Lofty presumes Dom is the casualty. Dom is distraught following the crash and Lofty warns him not to get over invested in Freddie. Dom reacts badly to Lofty interfering in his relationship. Mead explained that Dom struggles to understand why Lofty wants to help him. He believed this was because the abuse Dom suffered from Isaac made him suspicious.

The pair later begin to develop a romance. But Dom soon makes things awkward with Lofty when he suggests his ill grandmother Sheilagh Chiltern (Wanda Ventham) comes to live with them. Mead told Wilson that "it's such a kind gesture but it freaks Lofty out a bit". He added that "given their previous dalliances" Lofty is not ready to move in with Dom. After talking about the issue the pair agree to move on together and date. Jake Wetherill from the Daily Star observed that it was the moment viewers had been waiting for.

Their relationship took a while to happen because Dom was still emotionally damaged by Isaac. Ames defended Dom, stating "I think Dom can be forgiven for thinking that most men are bastards!" But Ames was actually happy with the slow progression of the relationship. He believed that Lofty helped his character remember that some people are "good and kind". Lofty is "unsure of life in general and quite timid". The actor thought this was an additional reason for their "slow burn" relationship. Ames quipped that Dom and Lofty are like a modern-day Ross Geller (David Schwimmer) and Rachel Green (Jennifer Aniston), two characters from the American sitcom Friends who became infamous for their on-off relationship. The actor concluded that scenes with Lofty bring "silliness and lightness" to his character's story. Ames enjoyed working with Mead and felt that professionally, they were similar. The relationship became popular with viewers who were eager for Dom to be happy. Ames received many messages on social networking site Twitter about Dom and Lofty.

Loft was written out of episodes the show for a number of episodes. In the story Lofty goes travelling in the United States. They grow distant while apart due to Dom dealing with a family crisis. Upon his return Lofty hides a secret which Dom soon discovers by searching Lofty's bag. He admits that he has had an affair with a woman. Ames told Wilson that viewers often sympathise with Loft, but on this occasion is the first instance that Lofty is in the wrong and causing issues. Writers introduced Lofty's secret lover Helen Pidge (Verity Marshall), who reveals she is pregnant with his child. Helen's presence causes doubt that Dom and Lofty can salvage their failing relationship. Helen tries to exclude Dom from her plans to bring the child up with Lofty. Producers then explored the issue of stillbirth when Helen gives birth to their baby prematurely after six months. The show's executive producer Simon Harper believed a father's perspective is traditionally overlooked. The story focuses on Lofty and Dom's grief more than Helen's. Harper added that "Lofty and Dom's relationship gives us the chance to explore that. Lee, David and Verity all give beautifully pitched performances in a heartbreaking episode." Following the stillbirth Dom and Lofty agree to renew their wedding vows. When Dom suggests they have children via adoption, Lofty declines. Then at the ceremony Lofty decides to end their relationship and leaves. The story formed Mead's departure from the series. Mead told Wilson (What's on TV) that "this is not just about the stillbirth, it's also about the problems that have occurred in Dom and Lofty's relationship. What happens is really sad."

=== Hepatitis C ===
2018 episodes featured the character at the centre of a Hepatitis C story. The Hepatitis C Trust announced that the story would be a long-running arc for Dom. While Cydney Yeates of the Daily Star said that it would initially cause issues with Dom and Lofty's relationship. The medical issue begins when Dom treats a patient named Susan Beckett (Susie Amy) for blocked arteries. He discovers that she has hepatitis C and proceeds with caution. Susan is a book publisher and explains how she is working on a book written by a domestic abuser. When he discovers she is working with Isaac he is stunned and it affects his work. When he operates on Susan he loses concentration and has a needle stick injury. He is then told he has probably caught the virus from Susan and takes a test to confirm this.

His illness affects his work life and he is unable to operate on patients. Ames told Wilson from What's on TV that "his Hep C diagnosis has had a massive impact on his work [...] and on his love life, because he just doesn't feel sexy." He is left emotionally vulnerable and he wants to be alone. When he goes for a walk he finds a woman, Shannon Laurence (Ffion Jones) with her leg impaled on a fence. Dom's mobile phone is broken and Shannon's is on the other side of the fence. He tries to retrieve it and cuts his hand. As they both have open wounds he is not allowed to treat Shannon because it will infect her. She starts to lose a lot of blood and she begs him to help her regardless of his hepatitis C. Ames said that Dom takes "a huge risk" in treating Shannon, which helps save her life. In return he gets a "feeling of worth", he realises that he is lucky to have Lofty's support and he decides to accept his diagnosis.

=== Adoption secret ===
"Dom is a very delicate character at the best of times and he's very frayed and fractured by this. He's definitely going to try and find some sort of anchor and stability, which he currently hasn't got from Carole, Ange or anyone at the moment."

— David Ames discussing Dominic's adoption secret. (2019)

Producers created a story in which Dominic discovers that he has been adopted. The story had been planned years in advance and offered a potential explanation for Dom's characterisation. Ames came up with the idea and producers liked how it could explain Dom constantly feeling "like an outsider". Dom had always been confused about his bad behaviour and he could never find an answer from Carole and Barry. The character often joked in scenes about being adopted and it becoming fact offers Dom an explanation to solve his confusion. Ames hoped that the story would demonstrate that good parents do not have to be blood relatives. To portray the subject correctly, Ames researched adoption and conversed with adoptees. He also based his performance on real life experiences such as break-ups. Ames had to keep the story a secret until the reveal was broadcast to surprise viewers.

His biological mother Ange Godard (Dawn Steele) had already been introduced into the show as a consultant. She was unaware that Dom is her son. The adoption revelation soon aired during an episode centric to Dom's birthday, in which Ange realises that Carole adopted her baby in the 1980s. She quickly realises that she has been unknowingly working alongside her son. Steele told What's on TV's Wilson that "this news is massive" and Ange and Carole have an "emotional" exchange in which "lots of secrets are revealed." In the closing moments of the episode Ange goes home to retrieve a shoe box filled with keepsakes about Dom. Steele added "it's all quite heavy, and it's about to get a lot worse."

Dom finds out he was adopted in the following episode when Carole confesses. He then discovers Ange his is mother while they are both operating on a patient. Ames chirped "as often happens in Holby, these emotional scenes take place over someone's open chest, so Dom and Ange are in quite an awkward situation." He told Sophie Dainty of Digital Spy that Dom reacts by "freaking out" and "absolutely loses his mind and has to run out while doing theatre". He reiterated to Wilson that Dom is "dumbfounded" and "completely floored". Dom is left in a "trance and spends most of the day just trying to get his head around this absolutely life-changing news." Ames believed that it would take some time for Dom to get used to Ange, but he wanted a relationship with her. Ange's attitude to the situation stalls any progress. Ames branded it "fairly tumultuous" and Dom feels Ange is not making an effort "to bridge this huge gap in his life." He also defended Ange because she is struggling to accept the information. Ames concluded that "they've basically got to start from scratch, really, to build a relationship, a bond and trust." Producers also remained committed to further development of Dom's relationship with his adopted mother Carole. Ames said that Dom is left feeling "sour" because he thinks his "beautiful bond" with Carole was "based on lies, secrecy and deceit."

Dom connects with Ange and Carole remained in the series. Ames said there was much for Dom and Carole to work through; adding "it'll be something where they realise that you don't have to be blood to be family." Writers explored feud and Carole resigns from her receptionist role. She threatens to move away, which forces Dom to make amends. Ames explained that Dom wants Carole to stay because of their bond, adding "it's a role you take on, the love you give and the relationship you build." Producers also introduced Dom's half-sister, Chloe Godard (Amy Lennox), who works at the hospital as a cardiothoracic registrar. Chloe does not know about the adoption and Dom is tasked with keeping quiet until Ange figures out a solution. Ames believed that he and Lennox bore a slight resemblance to one another, which made the story more authentic. He added that Dom finds it difficult to work with Chloe after the truth is revealed. Steele claimed that the story was unpopular with viewers because it disrupted Dominic and Carole's relationship they had been accustomed to. Negative fan reactions via the social networks Twitter and Facebook surprised Steele and she stated "that's what it's all about with these big, dramatic storylines - that's what you want. I would much rather play that than be bored."

=== Stoma procedure and final stories ===
In 2021, Holby City began a new story for Dom after he is involved in a car accident that leaves him with life changing injuries. Dom's internal injuries to his bowel mean that he is fitted with a stoma. Writers pitched the idea to Ames in 2020 and he thought it was an interesting issue to portray. The story begins when Dom crashes his car after a collision with Jodie Rodgers (Sian Reese-Williams). Dom is impaled by a metal pole into his abdomen. Sacha makes the decision to perform the stoma operation to prevent Dom dying in the procedure. Dom survives but finds his stoma unbearable. Ames told Victoria Wilson from What's on TV that "Dom feels as if his pride, his appearance and his independence have been whipped away." Writers explored how a person adjusts to life with a stoma as Dom struggles to accept reality. He sees his life as being unable to do certain things and reliant on medication which leaves him "seeking someone to blame". Dom sues the hospital for negligence and Ames branded it a "horrible" reaction but how Dom's honest view of the hospital's care. Ames explained that the story would show having a stoma does not completely debilitate a person. It shows a normal life can be achieved and those with stomas still have intimate relationships. Ames added that Dom "always struggled with feeling unlovable" and this "pushes him to the limit". The story is aimed to make having a stoma less of a taboo subject and Ames concluded that for Dom it is a "really fascinating journey" as adjusts to his own stoma.

On 2 June 2021, it was announced that the BBC had decided to cancel Holby City at the end of its twenty-third series. It was confirmed that the final episode would be broadcast in March 2022. The show's story producer Ben Wadey told Calli Kitson from Metro that writers were tasked with creating suitable endings for all the regular characters. Dom's final stories included working on a research project with Sacha in which they attempt to create a mesh to repair a parastomal hernia. He also considers a new career at a private hospital.

In the final episode Dom and Ange clash over her keeping her fiancée, Josh Hudson's (Trieve Blackwood-Cambridge) bulimia issues a secret. He is hurt that Ange has not included him in her family crisis and seeks answers. By the end of the episode, Dom and Ange agree to work on their difficult relationship. Steele said it was "full of emotion" and "it really finishes all our story off really nicely, but with a kind of forward thinking into the future, on they go, it's not fully conclusive." Steele told Victoria Wilson from TVTimes that "our final story is emotional. It ties things up and does Ange and Dom's story justice." In another interview, Steele stated that writers had fully explored Dom and Ange's story; while there is no definite story conclusion, there is a "happy moving forward feeling". Ames was content that Dom and Ange's relationship remained "tumultuous the whole time". He said it was excellent writing for them to leave it ambiguous because it was more realistic.

Dom's final appearance occurred in the show's finale episode, which was broadcast on 29 March 2022. Ames found it emotional when he filmed Dom's final scenes on the Keller ward where Dom had spent much off his screen time working alongside Sacha. Of the final day of filming and his final scenes, Ames stated that "emotions are running high but we have pretend lives to save." Ames celebrated the character's accomplishments in one of his final Holby City interviews. He revealed that Dom promoted diversity onscreen and his stories about his sexuality helped viewers come out themselves. He reflected that Dom's abuse story was another achievement for Holby City, adding "it reaches a lot of people and we’ve always strived to play our characters as truthfully as we can."

== Reception ==
For his portrayal of Dom, Ames was long-listed for Best Drama Star at the 2017 Inside Soap Awards, while Dom's domestic violence storyline was long-listed for Best Drama Storyline. Both nominations made the viewer-voted shortlist, although Ames failed to win any awards. Dom and Lofty's partnership was nominated for Best Soap Couple at the 2018 Digital Spy Reader Awards; they came in eleventh place with 2.8% of the total votes.

A What's on TV writer branded Dom a "sneaky, lying medic". Lorraine Kelly described him as "really horrible" but wanted him to stay because show's need a "bay boy" character. Anthony D. Langford from TheBacklot.com that with Dom's affair with Malick was the latter's most interesting romantic storyline. He also praised Holby City for reintroducing Dom and committing to gay story telling. Langford later praised Dom for not being "your earnest cookie-cutter sweet gay guy". He branded him "just bad, manipulative and scheming". The critic also loved how Dom plays innocent over his wrongdoings and bitchy remarks made to Arthur. He predicted that the pair would create "plenty of juicy conflict", noting "Arthur is easily baited and Dom is such a manipulator". A North Wales Daily Post writer branded Dom a "big fat liar" and "sociopath". A reporter from What's on TV branded Dom a "scheming" character. Jane Simon from the Daily Mirror said that Dom telling Kyle that Malick is dead was "just another of the massive lies that slip from Dominic's lips with surprising regularity."

Langford, now writing for TVSource Magazine was impressed with Dom's character development and commented "I love how we can see how much Dom has changed. So many shows don’t show character growth, but we’ve seen it with Dom." Helen Daly from the Daily Express said that the end of Dom and Isaac's story was a "dramatic conclusion", "harrowing episode" and "disturbing scenes". She added that viewers were both emotionally "broke down" and overjoyed at the story's conclusion. Cydney Yeates from the Daily Star branded Dom leaving Isaac a "tear-jerker" episode and said "his brave decision to report the abuse he faced turned social media into a frenzy." Kate Maccarthy from the Radio Times believed that viewers "watched in horror" as Dom was abused by Isaac and opined that it was "disturbing". Laura-Jayne Tyler from Inside Soap wrote "Dominic Copeland is almost as unlucky as some of the doomed patients who find themselves on the Holby operating table! After the horror of his ex-boyfriend Lee, the poor chap finally thought he'd found 'the one' in colleague Isaac, only for the super-controlling surgeon to reveal his true colours."

Charlotte Tutton of the Daily Mirror said that Holby City viewers were "desperate" for Ange and Dominic to build a relationship, adding that they were "devastated" and "heartbroken" as the character's story continued. Sue Haasler writing for Metro bemoaned the realism of the adoption secret story. She believed it was incompatible with Dominic and Carole's backstory. She was impressed with the acting in the story, stating that "it is making for some deeply emotional acting from David Ames, Julia Deakin and Dawn Steele. Their performances lift the story above the realms of soapy cliché."
