= Arthur Digby =

Fictional character from Holby City

- Holby City character
- Rob Ostlere as Arthur Digby
- First appearance: "Blood Ties"; 2 January 2013
- Last appearance: "Episode 1100"; 15 March 2022
- Portrayed by: Rob Ostlere

In-universe information
- Occupation: CT2
- Spouse: Morven Shreve (2016)
- Significant other: Chantelle Lane

Arthur Digby is a fictional character from the BBC medical drama Holby City, played by actor Rob Ostlere. He first appeared in the series fifteen episode "Blood Ties", broadcast on 2 January 2013. Arthur arrives at Holby City hospital to start his first year of the Foundation Programme. To prepare for the role Ostlere visited a hospital and shadowed a registrar and foundation doctors on their rounds. He has been described by Holby City's publicity department as "naïve and socially awkward" plus holding an "encyclopaedic knowledge" on unusual subjects. Ostlere's first days on-set influenced various aspects of Arthur's characterisation such as his "preppy attire", fidgeting with his glasses and his clumsy nature. Arthur is a talented doctor and his skills are awarded the medical prize titled, Junior Doctor of the Year. Arthur's storylines have focused on his career on the hospital's Keller and AAU wards, alongside the various characters that staff them. In his first year on-screen he works closely with mentor Antoine Malick (Jimmy Akingbola) and staff nurse Chantelle Lane (Lauren Drummond). The latter he develops romantic feelings for which are not reciprocated. Their friendship dominates his initial story and together they become victims of a vicious mugging and a car crash which is caused by Arthur.

His second year saw him working alongside F1 doctors Dominic Copeland (David Ames) and Zosia March (Camilla Arfwedson) while remaining on Keller. This trio dynamic proved popular with viewers and producers made the difficult decision to split them up. The move was labelled as an attempt to reflect reality as Junior Doctors generally progress to different wards and specialities. Arthur began his CT1 training on AAU where he is entrusted with mentoring Morven Shreve (Eleanor Fanyinka). Writers then introduced an issue lead storyline for the character as Arthur begins to behave anxiously, self medicating and finally being diagnosed with General Anxiety Disorder (GAD).

After three years in the role Ostlere decided to leave Holby City. The decision was made to kill the character off and producers planned a terminal cancer storyline. It also highlighted the importance of skin checks to detect melanoma and helped raise awareness for a British charity. The character died during the episode titled "I'll Walk You Home", broadcast on 7 June 2016. Ostlere reprised the role for guest appearances in 2017 and 2022. Critics of the show have often commented on Arthur's professional skills. Katy Moon of Inside Soap said that Arthur's bedside manner is non-existent. Jane Simon of the Daily Mirror branded him "very bright" but lacking surgical excellence when under pressure.

== Casting ==
Rob Ostlere passed the early stages of auditioning and was invited to complete an on-set audition at the BBC Elstree Studios. The actor felt nervous because it was the first time he had managed to secure an audition in the actual setting of a show. His casting was publicised a week before he appeared on-screen. Arthur is introduced into the series during the same episode as Gemma Wilde (Ty Glaser). Ostlere and Glaser prepared for their new roles by observing a surgical team in a real hospital. They also worked alongside a registrar and foundation doctors, the latter Glaser believed they "learnt a lot from". Ostlere also had a friend in medical training and sought advice from them.

== Development ==
=== Characterisation and introduction ===
Naïve and socially awkward, Arthur often has trouble understanding the subtleties of the human psyche. But his overwhelming enthusiasm is infectious and has made him an instant hit on the Keller ward. He reads voraciously and has an encyclopaedic knowledge of specific and often unusual areas of life. Arthur approaches patient cases with over-analytical enthusiasm, forgoing the bedside manner for piles of medical journals and unusual diagnoses.

— BBC Online.

Arthur is characterised as having his own sense of logic that differs to the rest of the hospital staff. Ostlere told a BBC Online reporter that "he can react in his own unique way" and he enjoys trying to decipher his character's reactions. He is not a mean or spiteful character but genuinely believes he is right. Arthur also plays a comedic role in the show because of his clumsy nature and initially was shown to fall over things on the wards. Osltere also claims to be clumsy and when he made mistakes while filming directors would choose to keep it in. Arthur is played as being insensitive in social situations and remains oblivious to other people's feelings. He is also very career ambitious and pressurises himself to succeed. He is good with the medical side of the occupation but fails to behave confidently when conversing with patients and staff. Arthur acknowledges that he lacks social skills but this makes him doubt his abilities. He is also enthusiastic about Napoleonic history but Ostlere did not need to research it because he was already knowledgeable in the field of history. Ostlere worried that he was similar to his character. This was made worse following his first day on-set when Producers mistook Ostlere's bag for an acting prop belonging to Arthur because it fitted their vision of the character. Arthur is stylised with a "preppy look" and the costume department bought in some "out there" costumes for him to wear. Arthur's glasses form part of his image. When Ostlere was on-set filming his initial episodes the glasses were loosely fitted and he had to keep adjusting them. This suited the character and became a permanent trait during the actor's portrayal. Arthur also has panic attacks and Ostlere found the scenes challenging and scary to film.

Arthur begins his career at Holby City hospital as junior doctor on beginning the foundation programme. He is placed on the Keller Ward under the supervision of Consultant Antoine Malick (Jimmy Akingbola), but fails to impress him. Glaser told Melanie Hancill of The People her character Gemma and Arthur share a competitive relationship because they are trying to earn the same role and the F1 prize in the hospital. He later becomes very stressed despite securing the aforementioned prestigious medical prize. Arthur struggles to live up to his new-found reputation, especially when he fails to reach a diagnosis for a patient and hastily dismisses a staff nurse's accurate findings. Arthur carries on his rotation of Keller Ward and learns that he has progressed well becoming the top performing F1. Consultant general surgeon Michael Spence (Hari Dhillon) decides to reward Arthur by placing him in charge of the ward. But this proves to be a mistake as he loses control of the ward.

=== Chantelle Lane ===
Arthur forms a friendship with staff nurse Chantelle Lane (Lauren Drummond) and he develops romantic feelings for her. Producers discussed Chantelle at length with Ostlere during the audition process. This made him believe that the two character would form a romance quickly, but this was not to be the case. The show play out a typical soap opera "will-they-won't-they?" story between them. The actors also had to re-shoot scenes together because Producers felt that their relationship appeared to be progressing faster than they had liked. An ex-boyfriend of Chantelle's, Rhys Hopkins (Gareth David-Lloyd), was introduced and Drummond believed that her character was still in love with Rhys. She told Katy Moon from Inside Soap that Chantelle loves Arthur as a friend only. Despite this Drummond perceived them to be a "cute" on-screen pairing, adding "it will take time for things to develop between them". She concluded that her character should give Arthur a chance, but noted he does not have the skills to impress her and should try to "man-up". When Arthur is in charge of Keller Ward he mistreats Chantelle and she accuses him of singling her out because she rebuffed his romantic intentions. He then has to attempt to repair their friendship.

Arthur and Chantelle are mugged by a mystery assailant and in the wake of their ordeal he feels guilty for being unable to protect her. When a patient named Cameron Pollins (Sam Jackson) begins acting strange Arthur realises he is their attacker. He threatens Chantelle and grabs her by the neck, but Arthur defends her and they share a kiss. Ostlere said that viewers see a change in Arthur and branded it the first time he managed to "man-up". Writers created a car crash storyline for the character, Arthur accidentally crashes his car into the back of a lorry with Chantelle and a colleague as his passengers. Ostlere told Moon (Inside Soap) that the crash episode is "shocking" with a "very tense" aftermath. Chantelle is critically injured in the accident and he rescues her from the wreckage, the actor added that "it's emotional for him seeing the girl he loves in danger." Arthur tries to compensate and fight his guilt by helping during Chantelle's operation. The scenes were filmed on a disused rail track near Luton which was made-up to look like a country road. Filming car crash sequences often requires the vehicle to be placed on a conveyor belt track. But Ostlere was allowed to drive the car with two high-tech cameras attached and he recalled having to be careful as not to break them.

Drummond decided to leave the series and producers devised an exit storyline centric to Arthur. Chantelle organises a birthday party for Arthur, but on that day Cameron is admitted to the hospital. Arthur mistreats Cameron because of the mugging attack. He forgets to order a scan and Cameron has a heart-attack and dies. Chantelle offers her support to Arthur, Drummond explained that her and Ostlere's characters are brought to the realisation that their close bond is not helping them overcome their ordeals. She decides to distance herself from Arthur by going travelling. But Drummond believed that "there's a hint that things aren't over between the two." Ostlere branded it a "relationship that has never quite happened" which made it more interesting. He also admitted that Arthur's feelings for Chantelle compromised his ability as a doctor.

=== Dominic Copeland and Zosia March ===
Following the departures of Drummond and Akingbola, Ostlere began working closely with David Ames and Camilla Arfwedson who play F1 doctors Dominic Copeland and Zosia March respectively. Ames was a former guest cast member and his reintroduced character Dom is an enemy of Arthur because he tried to ruin Malick's career. Working together on Keller Ward proves problematic because Arthur and Malick were close colleagues so his return inevitably causes friction. Ames told a BBC Online reporter that "Dom has a long way to go before Arthur even begins to consider them equals, let alone friends. Arthur is a faithful old Labrador." While Ostlere and Ames were interviewed by Lorraine Kelly, Ames explained that Arthur "is very suspicious about Dominic but he cannot convince Sasha" of his rival's true self. Sacha refuses to believe Arthur because he views them to be working well together, mostly due to Dom manipulating Sacha. Dom becomes bored of Arthur being difficult and decides to create tension for entertainment value. In an interview published by What's on TV, Ames stated "there's clearly a lot of friction between them and Dom likes to push Arthur's buttons, not least just to entertain himself." Their rivalry is clearly played out during scenes in which they treat the same patient. Arthur takes control of Keller on Sacha's orders, but an opportunistic Dom makes him appear unable to manage the situation. Ames explained his character's scheming against Arthur is motivated by Dom's career driven nature. He is willing to say and do anything and "will put his own job above anyone else's job".

Meanwhile, Arthur's flatmate Zosia becomes best friends with Dom despite Arthur's warnings. A dismissive Zosia then invites Dom to move into their flat. Holby City is usually confined to the hospital set but does often show Arthur, Dom and Zosia in their shared flat. The set is named "Arthur's flat" and often film in dressing gowns and Ostlere uses the on-set bed to rest, learn his lines and tried to spend more time there.

Arthur struggles to control Zosia increasing outlandish behaviour on the ward. Ostlere explained that Zosia has a dominant personality his character cannot handle because he is too socially awkward. When Zosia treats a cancer stricken patient similar to her mother she and Dom get drunk and return to the ward. Ostelere said that Arthur would have reported their behaviour but is compromised because he cares about Zosia and Dom. The scenes depict Arthur losing his good doctor image and turning into a rule-breaker as Zosia suffers a drug overdose resulting Arthur stealing hospital drugs in an effort to save her life. Fearing they will all be struck-off the medical register the trio make a pact to conceal the incident.

In 2015, Producer Simon Harper decided to split up the trio having Dom staying on Keller, Zosia moving to Darwin and Arthur working on AAU. Harper said it was a difficult decision to make and it was discussed at length with executive producer Oliver Kent. But Harper wanted to tell stories reflecting real medical careers. He noted that "as they mature and progress, [they] would go on to their separate disciplines and wards [...] What's great about the changes is that gives them different stories."

=== General anxiety disorder ===
Arthur begins to suffer from extreme anxiety. Following an explosion at the hospital he struggled to control his anxiety and stole medication to help suppress his fears. Morven Shreve (Eleanor Fanyinka) caught him taking hospital drugs for his own use and realised that he had been self-medicating. When Arthur made a mistake during treatment of a patient, Morven ended up getting blamed and she began to consider her future at the hospital. Arthur was later diagnosed with Generalized anxiety disorder. He took time off work to confront his GAD and returned to work when he felt he had overcome his problems. Ostlere told Bill Gibb from The Sunday Post that Arthur's storyline was realistic because of the demands junior doctors face in the NHS. It is plausible for many to develop the condition in such a pressured environment.

Ostlere learned that many people in society experience anxiety and believed that it was an important subject matter for Holby City to portray. It was also important for the show to make the storyline accurate for instance having "full-blown panic attacks" and more subtle moments with Arthur struggling to control it inside. They also ensured other characters were understanding of his condition to set an example to viewers. He also received much positive feedback from viewers and people with GAD. Dom decides to take Arthur to a seaside resort to give him a break and help him recover following the orders of concerned CEO Henrik Hanssen (Guy Henry). The pair argue over Dom's estranged father Barry Copeland (Nicholas Ball) after Arthur goes fishing with him. But Arthur defends his friend when he witnesses Barry being homophobic; but when Barry chokes on a peanut Arthur helps save his life. The incident brings Arthur to the realisation that his natural instinct is to be a doctor and decides to return to work. Following his return Dom forces Arthur to remove his "geek look" and try out a new look to aid his recovery. Ostlere told Gibb that "the idea is that he'll get over his anxiety by seeming more confident and putting on a bit of a show." He found it odd adjusting to his character's new look because he was so used to Arthur's glasses and attire. He added "Arthur's in a bit of a confused state at the moment and I found that a bit with the new look, too."

Arthur later returned to the hospital, but struggled to settle back into his daily routine. He was also disappointed to learn that he was no longer Morven's mentor, and that he had a lot of work to do to repair their working relationship. After his professional hero Professor Walter Dunn (Philip Fox) was admitted to AAU with issues related to alcoholism, Arthur received "a massive wake-up call" during a conversation with Guy Self (John Michie).

=== Cancer and death ===
"Arthur's always been very closed-minded about certain things and, suddenly, he opened up emotionally and revealed a different side to himself. Arthur developed a real sense of freedom through realising what's important about life... and what's important to him. But then, just as he realises that, he dies!"

— Ostlere on Arthur's final scenes.

Ostlere decided to leave Holby City after three years in the role. He felt that it was a "difficult decision" to leave but wanted to find new challenges. He was then informed that his character would be killed off following a diagnosis of terminal cancer. The actor viewed it as "a great opportunity" to be able to portray the disease. Producer Simon Harper gave Ostlere the option of his character not being killed off. When he discussed plans to kill off Arthur, Harper was surprised by the actor's reaction. He told Ostlere that he could create an alternate story enabling Arthur to depart the series alive. Ostlere went off and thought about the proposal and later gave his approval for the terminal cancer story. To prepare for the story Ostlere discussed cancer with an oncologist named Bruce. The professional also worked with the writing team to guide them. The actor also talked to his friends who had survived cancer about their experiences. The actor avoided watching other fictional portrayal of the illness such as film and television. He did not want to be influenced and copy stories from other works and preferred to draw from real-life experiences and scripts.

The cancer storyline was first publicised in advance spoilers released in February 2016. They detailed that Essie Harrison (Kaye Wragg) would find a mole on Arthur's back and notice characteristics associated with melanoma. She contacts Henrik to give Arthur further examinations to determine a prognosis. The examination is a result of Arthur being tested for compatibility to become a live liver donor for Morven's ill father Austin Shreve (Clinton Blake). When Morven's ex-boyfriend Ulysses Barnes (Rupert Lazarus) is admitted to Keller ward, he offers to become a donor. This upsets Arthur who wants to be the one to help Morven's family. Ostlere explained that his character is insecure because Ulysses is everything Arthur is not. Arthur is proven to be a match for Morven and he is "thrilled" to tell Morven because he "wants to be her hero". But Essie notices the irregular mole and Arthur dismisses her concern as being "over-protective". He added "he's never really noticed the mole before and reckons it's probably nothing." He really doesn't want to be dealing with this right now – he just wants to push on with being the saviour of the day, which he's never been before." Henrik orders that the mole be removed and examined. Ostlere believed that his character was shocked and his plans for Austin are put on hold. He added that Arthur "shuts down and doesn't tell anyone about it... especially Morven."

Ostlere later spoke in support of Melanoma Awareness Month and discussed the importance of a once-a-month skin check. He stated that playing the melanoma story made him increasingly aware that regular skin checks aid in the early detection of skin cancer. Gillian Nuttall, founder of Melanoma UK praised Holby City for raising awareness of the condition and credited them with an increase in callers to their helpline. Nuttall added "Rob Ostlere's portrayal of a patient has resonated with a number of melanoma sufferers."

Arthur's mole is removed and is told that the melanoma has been dealt with. The following month Arthur coughs blood and asks Dom to examine him. Dom orders a CT scan which reveals that he has secondary tumours on his lungs. Arthur tells Morven about his condition and accepts he must endure a tough course of chemotherapy. After undergoing chemotherapy Arthur is hopeful that his illness will be cured. He and Morven decide to get married the same day to celebrate his optimism. But Arthur is told by Sacha that his cancer has spread to his stomach and is terminal. Ostlere said Arthur was scared and turned to Sacha for "peace of mind" but did not expect to be told that he will die. Arthur is left in a "state of denial, anger and fear". He and Morven agree to cancel their wedding until Arthur has "a moment of clarity" and realises he wants to marry Morven more than anything else. The two go on and marry in a ceremony at the hospital surrounded by friends. The actor explained that "the wedding is about two people doing what they can to carry on and have an amazing day with all their family and friends. It's the best day of Arthur's life... but also the worst."

On 7 June 2016, Sara Wallis from the Daily Mirror revealed that "I'll Walk You Home" would be Arthur's final episode. It featured Arthur and Morven intending to leave Holby to travel before Arthur dies. Dom believes Arthur is being selfish and Arthur re-evaluates his choice and decides to stay. For Arthur's final episode Akingbola and Drummond reprised their roles as Malick and Chantelle. Malick appeared during a Skype conversation and Chantelle appeared in dream sequences envisioned by Arthur as he lay dying. George Rainsford also guest starred as Ethan Hardy, a character from its sister-show Casualty. Ostlere and Rainsford were long-time friends and had petitioned producers to enable their character to share a scene. Arthur collapses and falls unconscious. Nothing can be done to save his life as his cancer is too advanced. While unconscious Arthur has visions of his loved ones and hears Morven deliver her final words to him. He then dies surrounded by his friends.

=== Returns ===
Ostlere reprised his role in 2017 for Fanyinka's departure. He appeared as a vision to Morven as she decides whether to leave Holby with Cameron Dunn (Nic Jackman). Arthur appears in the series seventeen episode "Always and Forever", first broadcast on 19 December 2017.

Holby City was cancelled in June 2021 after 23 years on air with the final episode due to be broadcast in March 2022. Producers invited multiple former cast members to reprise their roles during the show's final series. Ostlere's return was announced on 9 March 2022 and Arthur appears in episode 1100, first broadcast on 15 March 2022. Arthur returns alongside Essie and Jasmine Burrows (Lucinda Dryzek); they all appear as a vision to Jac Naylor (Rosie Marcel), who is terminally ill and fears dying.

== Reception ==
Inside Soap's Moon described Arthur stating "geeky Arthur Digby is a master at cracking medical conundrums - but when it comes to bedside manner, he'd have better luck at solving a Rubik's Cube in the dark than finding the appropriate words of comfort!" The Holby City audience viewed Arthur, Dom and Zosia as the show's "dream team" and were sad when they furthered their careers separately. Flynn Sarler from Radio Times criticised the show for being miserable. He targeted Arthur as being one of the causes, adding "oh yes, and if this weren't bad enough, our beloved Dr Digby starts down a very dodgy road." A Coventry Evening Telegraph writer said that Arthur was constant proof that "nice guys always come last" in life.

A reporter of the South Wales Echo found it odd that the "scarily confident" Zosia and "dear little Digby" had so much in common as friends despite being "complete opposites". Their colleague criticised Arthur's awarding of the Junior Doctor of the Year award, labelling it a "source of embarrassment" and "odd" that he received it despite endangering fellow character's lives in the car accident. Another opined that Arthur and Dom's feud is the type of behaviour likely to make viewers research private health care rather than use the NHS. Jane Simon of the Daily Mirror questioned Arthur's surgical skills. She judged that "Arthur's a nice guy, and all that, and very bright but I'm not sure how pleased Elliot would be at having his brain being used as a learning experience. Let's also not forget that it was Digby who cost Malick his hand so I don't know how he'd ever live with himself if he wrecked Professor Hope's brain too."

Sara Williams of the Daily Mirror branded Arthur's exit "particularly gritty and gruelling". Sarah Deen from the Metro said that his death "might be one of its saddest episodes ever". Kayleigh Dray from Closer said that Arthur was a popular character and his death made "tearjerking scenes".
