= Holby City series 15 =

Holby City
- Series 15
- No. of episodes: 52

Release
- Original network: BBC One
- Original release: 16 October 2012 – 8 October 2013

Series chronology
- ← Previous; Series 14 Next → Series 16

The fifteen series of the British medical drama television series Holby City began airing in the United Kingdom on BBC One on 16 October 2012. The series ran for 52 episodes, concluding on 8 October 2013. Many characters departed and arrived during the series.

== Episodes ==
No. overall	No. in series	Title	Directed by	Written by	Original release date	Viewers (millions)
632	1	"The Third Way"	Robert Del Maestro	Martha Hillier, Dana Fainaru & Julia Gilbert	16 October 2012	4.80
Henrik Hanssen struggles to cope with the fallout from last week's interview. When a patient is then admitted who has contacted the press about his treatment at the hands of the NHS, Hanssen is determined to silence the critics. Tara is paranoid about her own condition when a patient arrives on Darwin and refuses the lifesaving treatment offered to them. Emotionally fragile, Tara lays into the patient as Elliot looks on horrified. After Eddi's drunken behaviour at Chrissie and Sacha's wedding, Luc has taken drastic action, determined to make Eddi face up to her problems.
633	2	"Chasing Demons"	Robert Del Maestro	Julia Gilbert	23 October 2012	4.74
Eddi is back on AAU and determined to prove she can cope. But when a patient case is too close to home and the pressures of a demanding ward begin to take their toll, Luc’s worst fears are realised. Elliot is utterly disillusioned when his artificial heart project, ten years in the making, has a last minute set back. But losing a patient on Darwin forces him back to his lab, determined to find a solution. Serena is unimpressed when Hanssen banishes her to AAU. It is the day of Chantelle’s interview and she is desperate to make a good impression – especially as Charlie Fairhead will be interviewing her! However one tricky patient case and a terrible interview later – is this Chantelle’s last day at Holby?
634	3	"Follow My Leader"	Lee Salisbury	Stephen Brady & Nick Fisher	30 October 2012	4.47
The arrival of new CT1 Lilah Birdwood causes ripples in the AAU playground as Michael and Serena do battle for her respect. But can Lilah prove herself worthy of their tussle or will she find herself on a plane back to Australia quicker than a corn snake up a trouser leg? When Jac is ordered by Hanssen to treat a Board Member’s daughter, she finds out more than she wanted to. Jac begins to doubt whether Hanssen is the leader she once thought he was, but when the opportunity to nail her colours to the mast presents itself, which way will Jac go? It is Chantelle’s first day as Staff Nurse, but she finds herself the envy of Marie-Clare and when new hunky radiographer Rhys arrives on the scene she is soon drawn into a dispute that nearly costs her professionally.
635	4	"If Not for You"	Lee Salisbury	Jamie Crichton	6 November 2012	4.65
The knives are out for Hanssen as the doubters continue to challenge his leadership, and when the son of his very first patient at Holby is admitted, the hospital CEO fights to save him and his own career. Jonny is stuck between Mo and Jac when they disagree over a difficult diagnosis, and as tensions boil over his attempts to please both women only make things worse. Sacha's dreams of being a consultant seem likely to go up in smoke - until he is faced with an amusing medical case.
636	5	"To Absent Friends"	Neasa Hardiman	Philip Ralph	13 November 2012	4.83
Serena thinks she is a cert to take over from the absent Hanssen as acting CEO, especially when her only other rival is Ric, who is too busy dealing with a transplant patient to worry about things like interviews. Things get tense between Jonny and Mo following their argument last week, while Michael's day starts badly with the news his children are not coming home until Christmas, and only gets worse thanks to a feisty health care assistant who has not got time for his pomposity.
637	6	"Hail Caesar"	Neasa Hardiman	Dana Fainaru	20 November 2012	4.84
With new CEO Imelda Cousins starting today, Ric is determined to keep control of his ward. But when Lilah tries to run before she can walk, he finds himself in the firing line. Meanwhile, Jac tries to get closer to Jonny through a case, but ends up feeling betrayed when she disagrees with a medical decision. Elsewhere, Luc is forced to come out of his lab when the new CEO demands he return to ward duties. With his research under threat, he recognises that he needs to let his friends help him, before he loses them all.
638	7	"After the Party"	David Tucker	Emer Kenny	27 November 2012	4.76
Imelda takes a shine to Jac, enjoying the fact that she helped to cast doubt over Hanssen's suitability for the job. Jac is keen to impress, but gets drawn into a complicated teen pregnancy case, leading Jac into finding out just what it means to disobey Imelda. Meanwhile, it is assessment day for new CT1 doctor Lilah, and having got off on the wrong foot with Malick, she is determined to pull it out the bag. Serena is hoping that today is her last shift on AAU, and is even more delighted when she discovers that she has worked with Imelda before. She throws herself into doing a good job, convinced she will be back on Keller in no time. But it turns out Serena's memory has not served her well and Imelda is not who she thought she was.
639	8	"How Lo Can You Go"	David Tucker	Joe Ainsworth	4 December 2012	4.97
Hertzig patient Aisha is readmitted and Elliot does all he can to save her, but it is not enough. Aisha's death has a massive impact on Tara, and when Ollie confronts her about her overreaction, Tara knows it is time to come clean about her brain tumour or risk losing Ollie forever. But can she tell him the truth? Meanwhile, Ric fails Lilah on an assessment and she can't help but wonder if the events of last week had anything to do with it. When a prying Imelda gets wind of an issue between Lilah and Ric, she quizzes Lilah for more information. Lilah is on guard, but will Imelda manage to squeeze the juicy secret out of her? Serena gives Michael a hard time over a case, but he is surprised to find support in the form of HCA Ramona. When she invites him to spend Christmas with her, a smitten Michael can't help but say yes.
640	9	"Fault Lines"	Paul Gibson	Nick Fisher	11 December 2012	5.00
The atmosphere is strained between Ric and Lilah. When Imelda gets involved, she only serves to antagonise an already fragile situation, resulting in Lilah making a formal complaint against Ric. Meanwhile, Mo's boyfriend Albie brings his dying wife to Holby for treatment. Jonny is determined that she shouldn't get involved, but will Mo listen to him? Elsewhere, when a patient towing a yacht arrives on AAU, Chrissie finds herself fantasising about a Caribbean island Christmas. Unfortunately for her, Sacha is only dreaming of family karaoke and chocolate fountains!
641	10	"Through The Darkness"	Paul Gibson	Martha Hillier & Dana Fainaru	18 December 2012	5.02
Ollie returns to Holby, having spent time away desperately researching Tara's condition; can she forgive him for running out on her when she needed him most? Missing his kids, Michael is paying extra attention to his blossoming romance with HCA Ramona. But when he encourages her to perform duties outside of her role, is he setting her up for a fall? Chantelle doesn't know where she stands with Rhys - is he going to ask her to the New Year's Eve Ball? She's determined to find out, but a patient with a needle phobia keeps her busy all day. Will Mary-Claire get in there first?
642	11	"And We Banish Shade"	Richard Platt	Martha Hillier	28 December 2012	4.74
Vegas-bound Ric swings by Holby and reveals he has a new job in the pharmaceutical industry. But, when his expertise is needed on an emergency patient, Ric is drawn in - can he really leave the hospital behind? And with Imelda on his case, is it too late anyway? As Jac finds herself embroiled in a family crisis, Jonny desperately wants to appeal to her better nature. Is Jac's Christmas spirit sprouting, or is it just the same old Naylor? Ma Levy is in town, and Chrissie is doing her best to stay sane amongst the chaos of Luc's cooking and Daniel's piano playing, whilst Sacha tries his hardest to delay joining her.
643	12	"Blood Ties"	Richard Platt	Christian O' Reilly	2 January 2013	4.40
As Luc finds a breakthrough in his research, a patient's tattoo unexpectedly becomes the gateway to his darker side. Can Sacha do anything to help his friend, or is it too late? Lilah is back at work, and is shocked to find Ric has not resigned. Will she be able to make peace, or is this one battle too far? Ollie is concerned that Tara's revelation has forced her back into her shell. When he tries to engage her in a patient case, it is clear that Tara is frustrated. How can he convince her that they are in this together?
644	13	"Hanssen/Hemingway"	Rob Evans	Justin Young	8 January 2013	5.11
Following Serena’s bidding, Jac travels to Sweden to find Hanssen. When she discovers the reason behind Hanssen’s actions, will she follow through with Serena’s instructions or will she side with Hanssen? And will Hanssen stay in Sweden or will he return to Holby? Michael puts Luc on a short leash following the events of last week, but with Serena sniffing around, will Michael be able to protect Luc’s future at Holby? Luc is haunted by events from the past: despite Michael and Sacha’s best efforts, he seems to be heading off the rails. Will he be able to face his fears and get back on track?
645	14	"Push the Button (Part 1 of 2)"	Matt Carter	Kirstie Swain	15 January 2013	5.15
Things couldn’t be better between Jac and Jonny, but when she hears that the former ‘love of her life’ is getting married, she is thrown and jeopardises everything that she cares for. Serena is running Holby like clockwork, but can she hold onto her position even when under threat from a competitor? When Chrissie finds a lump, she is afraid for her health but is reluctant to confide in Sacha.
646	15	"Push the Button (Part 2 of 2)"	Matt Carter	Julia Gilbert	22 January 2013	5.02
Jac is guilt-ridden after the events of last night and is desperate to put it all behind her - but keeping the truth from Jonny may prove easier said than done. Two new junior doctors turn up for work at Holby, and while Arthur fails to make a good first impression on Malick, Gemma surprises Michael when he discovers her extracurricular activities.
647	16	"The Waiting Game"	Ben Gutteridge	Matthew Barry	29 January 2013	5.05
Malick struggles to deal with the arrival of Jake - the son he never knew he had. While the visitor is keen to get to know his father, in doing so it seems he can't help but make trouble, forcing Ric to give the surgical registrar an ultimatum. Elliot's attempt to help a rebellious medical student backfires, and as new doctor Gemma tries to toe the line, just how long will it be until she lands herself in hot water again?
648	17	"Spence's Choice (Part 1 of 2)"	Ben Gutteridge	Tahsin Güner	5 February 2013	4.89
When a child with unexplained injuries presents on AAU, Michael and Chrissie can't help but suspect the parents of abuse, while Gemma and Sacha are more sympathetic. Meanwhile, Ollie is sick of splitting his life between two homes and suggests he move in with Tara. Ollie decides to show Tara that he can do things her way, which ends with them facing the wrath of Elliot. Elsewhere, Arthur's people skills are tested when he deals with a tricky patient.
649	18	"Spence's Choice (Part 2 of 2)"	Nigel Douglas	Martin Jameson	12 February 2013	5.20
Michael is forced to confront his decision to put a girl into care due to suspected child abuse when her mother, Mandy Fairlock, is admitted to the ward following an arson attack on the family home. A complaint is made against Elliot, but will Ollie forgive him for hiding the fact he knew about Tara's condition in time to help the situation? Serena finds herself professionally compromised when her mother is brought into the hospital.
650	19	"Ask Me No Questions"	Nigel Douglas	Jamie Crichton	19 February 2013	5.08
A tense situation arises in the acute assessment unit when an ex-patient takes Gemma hostage, leaving the trainee doctor fearing for her life. Malick and Nathan's secret relationship is going from strength to strength, but the registrar's determination to keep his private life from his colleagues looks set to ruin everything, while Tara faces her worst fear after suffering another symptom. Is this the beginning of the end?
651	20	"Unravelled"	Jamie Annett	Frank Rickarby	26 February 2013	4.95
Serena's mother's operation has finally been scheduled and she is determined that everything goes to plan. When there is a complication, however, who will she blame? Gemma wants to prove that she is ready to be back at work, but with the events of last week ever in her mind, will she be able to get through the day? In a bad mood, Mo turns to Jonny to cheer her up. But when he lets her down, she finds herself a new friend in Sacha.
652	21	"Recovery Position"	Jamie Annett	Nick Fisher	5 March 2013	4.30 (Note: Not reported in the weekly top 30 programmes for BBC One, so an overnight viewing figure is provided instead.)
When Anna, the mother of Malick’s son, Jake, turns up on Keller, seriously ill, he tries to keep it under wraps. However, it soon becomes clear that his emotions are caught up in the way he is treating her, and Ric has to intervene. Jonny is gearing himself up for Jac’s return but is thrown when she arrives back early. Will they be able to work together after everything that has gone on between them? It is the last straw for Serena when her mother’s transfer to the stroke ward is delayed.
653	22	"Not Aaron"	David Innes Edwards	Dana Fainaru	12 March 2013	4.70
Jac tries to impress Hanssen with a new surgical technique which she has been trained in, during her Japanese sabbatical. She experiences pain in theatre, and has to leave mid-operation. Malick has to tell his son, Jake, that Anna, the boy's mother, is terminally ill. He then has to admit to Nathan, his boyfriend, that Jake is actually his son. Anna dies on Keller. Gemma brings her son into AAU with her, and arouses suspicion from a difficult patient.
654	23	"Holbys Got Torment"	David Innes Edwards	Joe Ainsworth	19 March 2013	4.75
Jac discovers that she has endometriosis. She successfully carries out her Japanese procedure in theatre, impressing Hanssen and gaining funding, though slaps Jonny. Jake beats up a friend of his at Anna's wake. Malick struggles when Jake arrives at the hospital, as he has started to make plans with Nathan. Chrissie gets the all-clear from her cancer scare, and is seen hugging Michael by her husband, Sacha. As a result, the couple have a difficult day when Sacha reveals that he has been dining out with Mo, behind Chrissie's back.
655	24	"Journey's End"	Neasa Hardiman	Patrick Homes	26 March 2013	4.66
Tara scrubs-in in theatre with Elliot and Jac, though is experiencing symptoms from her brain tumour, and this causes Hanssen great concern. Chrissie finds an unlikely ally in Sacha's daughter, Rachel, who is at the hospital whilst skiving off from school. It is Chantelle's birthday, and she asks Arthur to keep it a secret from the others - but Arthur admits that he's not very good with secrets.
656	25	"The End of The Beginning"	Neasa Hardiman	Matthew Broughton	2 April 2013	4.77
Tara is on administrative duties, as decreed by Hanssen and Elliot, though Jac has other ideas. Ollie tries to persuade her to go and see a neurosurgeon about her condition. Serena treats an undercover journalist, who manages to dig dirt on her mother's condition, post-stroke, as she is recuperating in a private hospital. It transpires that Chantelle, who feels guilty, has been visiting Serena's mother to help her regain her speech. Arthur struggles during his F1 exams with Malick and Ric - though manages to pull off a brilliant diagnosis.
657	26	"Promises, Promises"	Richard Signy	Nick Fisher & Dana Fainaru	9 April 2013	4.99
An eminent visiting surgeon from Newcastle tempts Malick with the prospect of a consultancy. Malick is torn between his career and his new-found duty as a father. Gemma's Dr Honey past catches up with her, when her stalker appears on the ward, and she happens to be treating his mother. She hands in her resignation to Hanssen. Tara proposes to Ollie before her operation, so that he can act as her next of kin in case she should die, as she wishes to donate her organs. The couple are not exactly thrilled when her parents arrive in Holby for the wedding.
658	27	"Great Expectations"	Richard Signy	Martha Hillier	16 April 2013	4.68
It is the day of Tara's operation to remove her brain tumour, with visiting neurosurgeon Roxanna. With Ollie and her parents by her side, she goes under the knife in Darwin's theatre, as Hanssen, Elliot, and Jac anxiously await news. Malick struggles to "come out" to Jake, though a tactless conversation featuring Serena and Arthur save him the bother. On Gemma's final day, she works alongside Michael and Sacha, wondering whether she has made the right decision about her future. Tara dies in surgery after suffering complications, sending shockwaves through the hospital, her final wish for her organs to be donated is honoured by Ollie and her parents.
659	28	"Second Life"	Rob Evans	Paul Matthew Thompson	23 April 2013	4.56
All eyes are on Arthur, after his receipt of the F1 prize. Michael, replacing Ric on Keller, entrusts a tricky case to him, which seems to prove too much for the young F1. Ric is sent to AAU by Serena, where he struggles with the fast pace of the unit, and Gemma ends up saving the day after Ric nearly makes a fatal mistake. Everyone is surprised to see an emotional Ollie return to work after Tara's funeral, and he clashes with Elliot.
660	29	"Time Has Told Me"	Rob Evans	Ian Kershaw	30 April 2013	4.38
Elliot tries to help Ollie, only for the tension between the pair to threaten their professional relationship, especially when the latter's counsellor gets involved. Ric discovers his brief spell on AAU is to be made permanent, causing him to question his passion for emergency medicine, while Malick's frustration with being overlooked for promotion leads him into conflict with Michael on Keller.
661	30	"Only Human"	David Tucker	Rebecca Wojciechowski	7 May 2013	4.64
Malick is given the extra responsibility he longs for when he is put in charge of a mysterious high profile patient. When he learns about the patient's relationship with a serial killer, he struggles to avoid being drawn into her web. Sacha returns from an idyllic family holiday to learn devastating news about his daughter Rachel's health. How will he manage to remain strong for the family in their hour of need? Jac is stunned by news that she never thought she would hear.
662	31	"The More Deceived"	David Tucker	Joe Ainsworth	14 May 2013	4.47
Malick feels professionally compromised as he is tempted to make a deal with a murder accomplice in order to find the body of a missing girl. Gemma deals with a patient who thinks she is a vampire, while warding off the charms of AAU's posh new doctor Harry. How long will she be able to resist? Ollie's denial about his grief over Tara's death begins to break down, as he contemplates his future without her.
663	32	"Divided We Fall"	Lisa Clarke	Justin Young	21 May 2013	4.64
Sacha is determined to be strong and positive for Rachel, hanging all his hopes on the chemo and protecting her from the truth. However, when Rachel's chemo results come back, his world is turned upside down. Jac can't bring herself to tell Jonny about the pregnancy, in spite of Mo's protestations. But when they clash over a young patient, Jonny makes a discovery that means Jac can no longer hide the truth. Arthur's attempt to woo Chantelle with an old fashioned mix tape goes disastrously wrong when Malick gets involved.
664	33	"Back From The Dead"	Lisa Clarke	Jon Sen	28 May 2013	3.65
Malick is stunned when he realises that Amanda Layton lied to him. Her deathbed confession wasn't true and her victim is not buried where she told him. But there's worse to come for him, a betrayal by Dominic leads to him being suspended by Hanssen and his career hangs in the balance. Sacha is devastated when none of the family is a match for Rachel's bone marrow donation, until he reminds Chrissie that Daniel hasn't yet been tested. But will Chrissie be prepared to put her son at risk in order to save Rachel? Jonny and Jac struggle over how to deal with her pregnancy and Jonny is amazed when he realises he's actually made Jac cry. But can they overcome their differences and find a way to be parents without being together?
665	34	"Home"	Rob Evans	Nick Fisher	4 June 2013	4.14
Holby is under the microscope as Amanda Layton's case is heard in the coroner's court. Malick's personal and professional lives are put in jeopardy. Gemma's day goes from bad to worse when she encounters a difficult patient and problems at home. Gemma is forced to seek help from an unlikely source.
666	35	"All Tomorrow's Parties"	Jamie Annett	Graham Mitchell	11 June 2013	4.44
As Sacha and Chrissie wait for the results of Daniel's tests, Sacha doesn't feel much like celebrating his birthday. Chrissie tries to maintain a brave face, but even if Daniel is a match, can she put her son through the procedure? Michael's plans are thrown awry when Jasmine gets an earlier flight from America. He's determined to get away from Holby in time, but will he be able to pass responsibility for his patients to Serena? Elliot is concerned about Ollie's behaviour, but Ollie insists he is fine. An unusual case from AAU forces Harry and Ollie to work together - will they crack the case?
667	36	"Follow the Yellow Brick Road"	Jamie Annett	Johanne McAndrew & Elliott Hope	18 June 2013	4.26
Ollie is on the brink of losing all control over his life. When his mistakes threaten to derail the entire ward, Elliot tries to protect him from Jac and insists that Ollie has to come to terms with the loss of Tara, on his own basis. Unwilling to accept anyone's help Ollie encounters Lexi, a Herzig patient, and tries to discover what is causing the Herzig to fail to prove he is still in control. Tensions are still running high between Sacha and Chrissie over Rachel's bone marrow transplant. Chrissie is terrified of losing Daniel, just like she lost Amanda. Can she risk putting her son through a procedure knowing there's a risk he could die? Michael is struggling with the fact he simply can't help his patient Seb. When Seb's father accuses Michael of giving them false hope and retreats from seeing Seb, Michael is devastated. Michael resolves to make one of Seb's last wishes come true.
668	37	"Break"	Graeme Harper	Nick Fisher	25 June 2013	4.28
Ollie is adamant he is fit to work but when his erratic behaviour endangers a patient's life, Gemma has to step in. Will he let her take the fall? Can Chrissie forgive Sacha for lying or is it the end of their marriage? Arthur's patient gives him some life advice, but will he 'grab the bull by the whatsits' and tell Chantelle how he really feels?
669	38	"The Journey Home"	Graeme Harper	Julia Gilbert	2 July 2013	4.31
Michael struggles to remain impartial as Seb deteriorates and his parents can't be found. Meanwhile Jasmine wants to know if she can stay in the United Kingdom with him, what will Michael decide? When Harry is put in charge of AAU for the day, he and Gemma clash, but will a difficult case make Gemma see a different side to Harry? When Sharon invites Elliot to the opera he readily accepts until Mo, Jonny and Jac point out this may be a date. Does Elliot know what he's getting into?
670	39	"Mens Sana In Corpore Sano"	John Maidens	Patrick Homes	9 July 2013	4.27
As Oliver and Harry prepare presentations to compete for the next rotation on Darwin, Oliver reaches rock bottom as he stoops to stealing Tara's work and passing it off as his own. He finally faces up to his grief and his guilt over Tara and comes clean, exonerating Gemma in the process; he then bids Elliot and Holby a fond farewell before heading off to face his future. Harry is indignant to hear how Gemma has been stitched up by Oliver. When an angry patient's relative forces him to look at his own approach to life, he discovers his better side when he offers to renounce his claim on Darwin in return for Oliver clearing Gemma's name. Malick returns, planning to keep a low profile but immediately antagonises a patient and loses his nerve. But a comment from Arthur gives him the opportunity to give his patient a new lease of life - The Malick is back!
671	40	"Make or Break"	John Maidens	Rob Kinsman	16 July 2013	4.11
Arthur is given new responsibilities now that he is an F2 and put in charge of Keller for the day. As he struggles to work with Chantelle after she rejected his advances, the ward starts to fall into chaos when a family member of a patient goes off the rails.Distracted by Jonny's excitement about her next scan, Jac finds herself on the back foot when a patient she had previously operated on returns to Darwin with new complications. Sacha tries to stay positive as the results of Rachel's bone marrow transplant are due, but unfortunately for him, the world's most pessimistic patient has just entered AAU.
672	41	"A Night's Tale"	Pip Short	Dana Fainaru	23 July 2013	4.60
Arthur wrestles with his guilt following the mugging as Chantelle insists on returning to work. However Chantelle's determination is challenged by a difficult patient. Mo tries to ignore William's first birthday, but when a familiar patient arrives needing her help, will she be able to maintain her distance? When Harry discovers it is Mary-Claire's birthday, he realises she thinks he has surprise plans for her... can he wriggle out of them, or will he do the right thing and make her day special?
673	42	"Never Let Me Go"	Pip Short	Julia Gilbert	30 July 2013	4.67
Tensions are high as Hattie deteriorates and Mo is determined to find a solution at any cost. Hanssen is thrown when his past love, Maja, visits the hospital and Arthur wants to know where he stands with Chantelle after their kiss. Mary-Claire is flying high after her romantic date with Harry, but does he feel the same way?
674	43	"Digby Dog"	Richard Platt	Martha Hillier	6 August 2013	4.43
While trying to discover Charlie's real identity, Chantelle begins to find her spirits lifting in his company; but following their recent kiss, will Arthur be able to keep a lid on his jealousy? When a best forgotten figure from Serena's past comes to work at Holby, she finds her professional and personal lives clashing, but rather than containing the problem the battle lines are drawn immediately. Does she really want to bury the hatchet? Elliot is flying high as his relationship with Sharon grows stronger, but some shocking news threatens to blow them apart. When Elliot is forced to make an emotional decision can he stay true to himself?
675	44	"Old Wounds"	Richard Platt	Patrick Homes	13 August 2013	4.67
When Mo is made to face the consequences of her actions, she starts to question if she has made the right choices. As the pressure builds from all sides, will she stick to her guns? As Chrissie faces her latest scan, who will she lean on for support? And can she and Sacha find the courage to tell each other the truth? When Serena finds out that Edward is attending the same high flyers medical dinner as her, she is desperate to find a plus one, but where on earth will she find someone to agree to go with her?
676	45	"All At Sea"	Alan Wareing	Laura Poliakoff	20 August 2013	4.30
It is the day of Rachel's fundraiser, and a stressed Sacha struggles to organise the event whilst trying to cope with his damaged relationship with Chrissie. When a patient notices Michael and Chrissie's growing closeness, Sacha becomes jealous and starts to suspect that something is going on between them, leading to a confrontation. Serena is delighted to be performing a difficult operation that will be streamed live to surgical students, but when her mother is admitted to hospital she is conflicted between her responsibilities as a daughter and her professional development. She turns to Edward for advice. Elliot organises a weekend away with Sharon, but when she is offered a fantastic job opportunity in the US, he is torn about the validity of their relationship. When his patient requires a psychiatric assessment, he has to work alongside Sharon and is forced to confront his feelings.
677	46	"Good Day for Bad News"	Alan Wareing	Johanne McAndrew & Elliott Hope	27 August 2013	4.21
Chrissie is nervous about her prognosis consultation while having to deal with the fall out of an RTA on AAU. She becomes emotionally involved with a patient case, reflecting on her own medical health. She reaches out to Sacha, wanting him to come home but then ultimately ends up pushing him away. Elliot is taken aback when the offer is laid on the table of a holiday with Sharon. He's reluctant at first but soon comes round, feeling that he wants to take their relationship further, opting for a three month sabbatical. He's pulled up short when working with Sharon, which makes him question whether he's doing the right thing. Serena feels harassed and tense working alongside her smooth-tongued ex-husband, Edward. He makes light of their unusual work set-up but when she secretly looks through a bag delivered by courier from his wife, she realises that he's been economical with the truth.
678	47	"Point of Impact"	Nigel Douglas	Lucia Haynes	3 September 2013	4.63
There is an emergency when a patient is brought in with an unexploded device embedded in his chest and Harry endangers his colleagues' lives with his maverick approach. Arthur starts to buckle under the pressure of Hanssen's attention and puts a patient at risk when he panics. Some unexpected patient's relatives give Jac and Jonny an idea to lift Elliot's mood - but his reaction takes them by surprise.
679	48	"The Kick Inside"	Nigel Douglas	Joe Ainsworth	10 September 2013	3.95
It is the day of Jac's 20-week scan, but she is stunned to find that her baby has complications. Can she and Jonny find a way to help each other through their devastating news? Meanwhile, Edward encourages Mary-Claire to try to get into Ric's good books, and she is uncharacteristically caring when she becomes involved with a homeless patient. But when a mistake is made in theatre, it rocks Mary-Claire's confidence. Elsewhere, Arthur learns that being nominated for Doctor of the Year brings its own set of problems - particularly as he is caught between three women. He finds himself getting into hot water with new F1 Zosia, and letting Chantelle down.
680	49	"Contra Mundum"	Henry Mason	Patrick Wilde	17 September 2013	4.52
Jac and Jonny are still in shock after finding out about their unborn baby's diagnosis and are forced to make some tough decisions. Meanwhile, Malick is keen to prove to Hanssen that he can meet his responsibilities as clinical skills tutor. However, will new F1 Zosia prove too much for him to handle? Elsewhere, Chrissie is determined to treat today like any other day, despite the fact she is starting treatment for cancer. But she finds herself making a friend in fellow cancer patient Tim.
681	50	"Fredrik"	Henry Mason	Julia Gilbert	24 September 2013	4.41
Malick's career is on the line after his behaviour last week. However, when Hanssen suggests they work together on a case, will Hanssen be able to lead by example? Chrissie's struggling to cope with cancer treatment, a difficult patient and Daniel's first day of nursery. Sacha's keen for Chrissie to take it easy, but new friend Tim encourages Chrissie to carry on – who will she listen to? Jac is keen for everything to continue as normal after the traumatic events of last week, but an unusual case and a surprising suggestion from Jonny mean there may be more challenges in store for Jac.
682	51	"The Cost of Loving"	Richard Signy	Kim Revill	1 October 2013	4.53
Hanssen is still wrestling with his conscience after learning that he is to be a grandfather, and when Chantelle's niceness puts a pregnant patient at risk, he is out for blood. Will Arthur risk his chances of winning the Young Doctor of the Year award to stand up for Chantelle? Meanwhile, Sacha tries to remain optimistic about Chrissie's radiotherapy, but when he confides in Mo, things go too far. Elsewhere, it is Malick's first day on the job as a consultant and it is Serena's birthday - both are in for unwanted surprises.
683	52	"Like a Prayer"	Richard Signy	Nick Fisher	8 October 2013	4.21
Hanssen is all set to take Malick in for a complex operation, when Chantelle is taken critically ill. Hanssen is forced to switch operations and try to save Chantelle's life. Meanwhile, Jonny and Jac have to deal with a patient who is literally being fought over by his overbearing mother and spoilt fiancée. Whilst they struggle to contain the family, an old friend of Jonny's swoops in as an agency nurse to assist them. But will Jac appreciate the help?

== Production ==
The series is produced by the BBC and will air on BBC One and BBC One HD in the United Kingdom. Johnathan Young was the executive producer until Episode 40. As of Episode 41, Oliver Kent is the Executive Producer. Justin Young was the Consultant Series Producer until Episode 52, his last episode as writer was Episode 32.

== Cast ==
=== Overview ===
All 16 main characters from series fourteen initially returned. Derek Thompson returned for a guest appearance as Casualty's Charlie Fairhead in episode 2. Natasha Leigh joined as CT1 Lilah Birdwood for 8 episodes from episode 3. Sarah Jane Potts (Eddi McKee) left in episode 2, followed by Joseph Millson (Luc Hemingway) in episode 13. Guy Henry (Henrik Hanssen) was absent between episodes 5 and 12, though returned in a special episode set partly in Sweden. Ty Glaser and Rob Ostlere joined the show in the New Year, playing foundation year 1 doctors Gemma Wilde and Arthur Digby. Rosie Marcel (Jac Naylor) was absent between episodes 16 and 20. Tara Lo (Jing Lusi) died in episode 27 after having an operation to remove part of her brain tumour. Jules Knight joined as of episode 31 playing core training year 1 doctor Harry Tressler. James Anderson (Oliver Valentine) left in episode 39. Aden Gillett joined in episode 42 playing locum consultant anesthetist Edward Campbell, ex-husband of established character Serena Campbell. Camilla Arfwedson joined as from episode 48 as foundation training year 1 doctor Zosia March. Guy Henry (Henrik Hanssen) left in episode 52, the series finale.

=== Main characters ===
- Jimmy Akingbola as Antoine Malick
- Chizzy Akudolu as Mo Effanga
- James Anderson as Oliver Valentine (until episode 39)
- Camilla Arfwedson as Zosia March (from episode 48)
- Bob Barrett as Sacha Levy
- Paul Bradley as Elliot Hope
- Hari Dhillon as Michael Spence
- Lauren Drummond as Chantelle Lane
- Aden Gillett as Edward Campbell (from episode 42)
- Ty Glaser as Gemma Wilde (from episode 15)
- Guy Henry as Henrik Hanssen (until episode 4, episodes 13−52)
- Tina Hobley as Chrissie Williams
- Jules Knight as Harry Tressler (from episode 31)
- Jing Lusi as Tara Lo (until episode 27)
- Rosie Marcel as Jac Naylor
- Niamh McGrady as Mary-Claire Carter
- Joseph Millson as Luc Hemingway (until episode 13)
- Rob Ostlere as Arthur Digby (from episode 12)
- Sarah-Jane Potts as Eddi McKee (until episode 2)
- Hugh Quarshie as Ric Griffin
- Catherine Russell as Serena Campbell
- Michael Thomson as Jonny Maconie

=== Recurring and guest characters ===
- David Ames as Dominic Copeland (episodes 28−34)
- Jotham Annan as Nathan Hargreave (from episode 12)
- Roger Barclay as Terence Cunningham (episodes 3−4 and 14)
- Gareth David-Lloyd as Rhys Hopkins (episodes 3−12)
- Maria Fernandez-Ache as Ramona Gomez (episodes 5−10)
- Hermione Gulliford as Roxanna MacMillan (episodes 25-28)
- Ben Hull as Derwood "Mr T" Thompson
- Natasha Leigh as Lilah Birdwood (episodes 3−12)
- Louis Payne as Jake Patterson (episodes 15−27)
- Tessa Peake-Jones as Imelda Cousins (episodes 6−11)
- Carlyss Peer as Bonnie Wallis (from episode 52)
- Madeleine Potter as Sharon Kozinsky (episodes 30−46)
- Derek Thompson as Charlie Fairhead (episode 2)
- Sandra Voe as Adrienne McKinnie (from episode 18)
