= Sally Osborne =

British film and television actress (born 1952)

Sally Osborne (born 19 September 1952) is a British film and television actress. She has appeared in a number of television series including The Cedar Tree, Cribb, King's Royal, The Duchess of Duke Street, A Tale of Two Cities and Raffles.

== Filmography ==
Film

- Mutiny on the Buses (1972)
- Sweeney! (1977)
- Haunted Honeymoon (1986)
