= Paradise Postponed =

- Novel on which series is based (publ. Viking Press)
- Written by: John Mortimer
- Directed by: Alvin Rakoff
- Starring: Michael Hordern; Annette Crosbie; Peter Egan; Paul Shelley; David Threlfall
- Country of origin: United Kingdom
- Original language: English
- No. of series: 1
- No. of episodes: 11

Production
- Running time: 50 minutes
- Production company: Euston Films for Thames

Original release
- Network: ITV
- Release: 15 September – 24 November 1986

Paradise Postponed (1986) is a British 11-episode TV serial based on the 1985 novel by writer John Mortimer. The series covered a span of 30 years of postwar British history, set in a small village.

== Plot ==
The series explores the mystery of why Reverend Simeon Simcox, a "wealthy Socialist rector", bequeathed the millions of the Simcox brewery estate to Leslie Titmuss, the son of Simcox's accountant George Titmuss, who has risen from doing odd jobs for the rector to be a city developer and Conservative cabinet minister. Simeon's sons Fred, a jazz-drumming country doctor, and Henry, once Britain's brightest and angriest writer who now works for Hollywood, conduct inquiries into their father's life as they try to understand the will. The setting of the work in an English village shows it absorbing and reflecting the upheavals of British society from the 1940s to the 1970s, and the many changes of the post-World War II society.

== Cast ==
- Michael Hordern - Rev. Simeon Simcox
- Annette Crosbie - Dorothy Simcox
- Peter Egan - Henry Simcox
- Paul Shelley - Fred Simcox
- Colin Blakely - Dr. Salter
- Eleanor David - Agnes Simcox, née Salter
- Jill Bennett - Lady Grace Fanner
- Richard Vernon - Sir Nicholas Fanner
- Zoë Wanamaker - Charlotte 'Charlie' Titmuss, née Fanner
- David Threlfall - Leslie Titmuss
- Colin Jeavons - George Titmuss
- Albert Welling - Rev. Kevin Bulstrode
- Harold Innocent - Jackson Catelow
- Thomas Heathcote - Tom Nowt
- Claire Oberman - Lonnie Simcox, née Hope

== Production ==
The TV series was directed by Alvin Rakoff and was mainly shot in Henley-on-Thames and Marlow, Buckinghamshire in the second half of 1985. A three-part sequel, entitled Titmuss Regained, aired in 1991.

== Reception ==
The New York Times described the series as a "decided disappointment," with Mortimer having perhaps taken on too much. The technique of time shifts from the present to near past is said to be confusing more than illuminating of its characters. While containing a "distinct whiff of snobbery", the character of the lower-class Leslie Titmuss who rises on his wiles is developed as the most fascinating figure in the cast. In a 2014 retrospective review, Toby Manning of The Guardian described the series as "beautifully acted", which "simply oozes nostalgia for a bygone Britain", and called the character Titmuss "quite simply one of the most compelling characters in TV history."
