= A Tale of Two Cities (1980 TV series) =

1980 British television series

- Genre: Historical drama
- Based on: A Tale of Two Cities by Charles Dickens
- Written by: Peter Harding
- Directed by: Michael E. Briant
- Starring: Paul Shelley; Sally Osborne; Nigel Stock
- Composer: Paul Reade
- Country of origin: United Kingdom
- Original language: English
- No. of series: 1
- No. of episodes: 8

Production
- Producer: Barry Letts
- Cinematography: Elmer Cossey
- Running time: 30 minutes
- Production company: BBC

Original release
- Network: BBC One
- Release: 5 October – 23 November 1980

A Tale of Two Cities is an eight-part British television series that first aired on BBC1 in 1980. It is an adaptation of the novel A Tale of Two Cities by Charles Dickens. Paul Shelley plays the dual roles of Sydney Carton and Charles Darnay, the first actor to do so since William Farnum in the 1917 silent adaptation. Two weeks later, an American production was released featuring Chris Sarandon in the same dual roles.

== Cast ==
- Paul Shelley as Sydney Carton/Charles Darnay
- Ralph Michael as Doctor Manette
- Sally Osborne as Lucie Manette
- Vivien Merchant as Miss Pross
- Nigel Stock as Jarvis Lorry
- Judy Parfitt as Madame Defarge
- Stephen Yardley as Defarge
- Eric Mason as Jacques Three
- David Collings as John Barsad
- Peter Cleall as Jerry Cruncher
- Michael Halsey as Jacques One
- Brian Grellis as Jacques Two
- David Webb as Gabelle
- Harold Innocent as Stryver
- John Abineri as Roadmender
- Morris Perry as Marquis St Evremonde
- Michael Gothard as Gaspard
- Frank Tregear as Roger Cly
- John Rolfe as Bank Clerk
- Harry Fielder as Gaoler
- David Rose as Guard Room Officer
- Dennis Savage as Young Cruncher
- Peter Farmer as Barrier Official2
- John Ringham as Attorney-General

== Bibliography ==
- Baskin, Ellen (1996). Serials on British Television, 1950-1994. Scolar Press. ISBN 9781859280157.
- Farina, William (2022). Screening Charles Dickens. McFarland & Company. ISBN 9781476647869.
- Pointer, Michael (1996). Charles Dickens on the Screen. Scarecrow Press. ISBN 9780810829602.
