= Titmuss Regained =

1990 novel by John Mortimer

- First edition
- Author: John Mortimer
- Language: English
- Published: 1990, Viking Press
- Media type: Print
- Preceded by: Paradise Postponed

Titmuss Regained is a novel by John Mortimer published in 1990. It is a sequel to his 1986 novel Paradise Postponed.

== Plot synopsis ==
Leslie Titmuss returns to Rapstone village and will do whatever it takes to fit in with the highest levels of society. Married to his second wife, Jenny, he seeks to buy his first wife's country house. These plans are hampered by a real estate development that Leslie, due to his free market politics, can hardly oppose publicly.

== Reception ==
In a 1990 book review in Kirkus Reviews, the review summarized; "Mortimer is a writer of great charm, a master of light and shade who has done the next-to-impossible and produced a dull gray novel, devoid of subtlety. In Paradise Postponed, he kept a large cast effortlessly afloat, but here he drives his two principals grimly forward, while giving short shrift to everybody else. Too bad." In reviewing the 2011 reissue, Robert Plunket of the New York Times called it "a classic comedy of political manners" and "a delightful book, funny, wise and ultimately very sad. If Mr. Mortimer doesn't quite turn the whole thing into the tour de force it almost is, it is not through lack of effort."

== Adaptation ==
Thames TV adapted the book for a television series released in 1991, starring Kristin Scott Thomas and David Threlfall.
