= Rob Ostlere =

British actor

Robert Ostlere is a British actor, best known for his portrayal of Arthur Digby in the medical drama Holby City. He made his first appearance on 2 January 2013 and departed on 7 June 2016.

== Early life ==
Ostlere graduated from the Royal Academy of Dramatic Art in 2008. He prepared for playing a doctor in Holby City by going to a hospital with Ty Glaser and spending the day with a consultant and registrar. He also watched surgery being performed and followed F1 doctors.

== Personal life ==
Robert Ostlere got engaged to actress Vicki Davids in November 2021. They married on 8 May 2022.

== Career ==
In 2011 Ostlere appeared in the series premiere of the American television series Game of Thrones, appearing as Night's Watch ranger Waymar Royce. He is killed by a White Walker six minutes into the episode's cold open, giving him the distinction of playing the first character ever killed on that show, which is known for its large number of character deaths. On this, Ostlere comments, "To be honest, when you do those smaller parts, you’re just happy to see yourself up there because sometimes those things can get cut".

The National Television Awards longlisted him for best newcomer for his role in Holby City.

== Filmography ==
=== Film ===
Year	Title	Role
2009	Tortoise	Billy
2011	The Task	Pisser
2011	The Vessel	Rob
2013	Life's a Bitch	Bradley
2013	Hereafter	Danny

=== Television ===
Year	Title	Role
2008	Doctors	Graham Trist
2010	Doctors	Ashley Hughes
2011	Game of Thrones	Waymar Royce
2011	Making of Game of Thrones	Himself
2011	Game of Thrones: Costumes	Himself
2011	Game of Thrones: Inside the Night's Watch	Himself
2012	Restless	Shop Assistant
2013–2016	Holby City	Arthur Digby

=== Theatre ===
Production	Role	Director	Notes	Ref(s)
Confessional by Tennessee Williams	Steve	Jack Silver	Performed at Southwark Playhouse	
Blood Ties (Antigone)	Dimitri / Chorus	Jennie Buckman	Performed while at the RADA	
The Importance of Being Earnest	Algernon / Lane	Tim Walker	Performed while at the RADA	
A Servant to Two Masters	Truffaldino	Aileen Gonsalves	Performed while at the RADA	
Women Beware Women	Leantio	Katherine Rogers	Performed while at the RADA	
Gulliver's Travels	Gulliver / Page	Matt Wilde	Performed while at the RADA	
Othello	Iago / Brabantio	Oleg Mirochnikov	Performed while at the RADA	
Three Sisters	Solyony	Nicholas Barter	Performed while at the RADA	
Dolly West's Kitchen	Justin West	Nick Hutchinson	Performed while at the RADA	
Breaking Up	Joe	Marcus White	Performed while at the RADA	
Lethal Cocktails	Roast	Jonathan Tafler	Performed while at the RADA	
Giselle	Wilfred	Jonathan Tafler	Performed while at the RADA	
The Madras House	Philip Madras	Dawn Walton	Performed while at the RADA	
Catastrophe	Tommy	William Gaskill	Performed while at the RADA	
All That Fall	Luke	William Gaskill	Performed while at the RADA	
Much Ado About Nothing	Leonato	Wilson Milam	Performed while at the RADA	
Slaves	Mohammad / Jonathon	Nadia Latif	Performed at Theatre503	
The Trial of Ubu	Jailor	Katie Mitchell	Performed at Hampstead Theatre	
A Woman Killed with Kindness	Jenkin	Katie Mitchell	Performed at the Royal National Theatre	
Playlist	N/A	Derek Bond	Performed at Theatre503	
God is Jealous	N/A	Moira Buffini	Performed at the Bush Theatre	
Epic	N/A	N/A	N/A	
The Indian Wants the Bronx	N/A	N/A	Performed at the Young Vic	
Faliraki: The Greek Tragedy	Nova	Paul Roseby	Performed while at the National Youth Theatre	
Murder in the Cathedral	2nd priest	N/A	Performed while at the National Youth Theatre	
Cell Sell	Henry	N/A	Performed while at the National Youth Theatre	
Resurgum	Samuel Pepys	N/A	Performed while at the National Youth Theatre	
Miss Dorothy.com	Mr Fruity	N/A	Performed while at the National Youth Theatre	
Out of the Shadows	Adam	N/A	Performed while at the National Youth Theatre	
