= Ty Glaser =

English actress

- Born: 12 November 1982 (age 43); Southampton, England
- Occupation: Actress
- Years active: 2000–present
- Known for: Holby City; Emmerdale; Ackley Bridge

Ty Glaser (born 12 November 1982) is an English actress, known for her role as Dr. Gemma Wilde on the BBC drama series Holby City. She has also appeared in numerous television series, such as Secret Diary of a Call Girl, Above Suspicion, The Bill and Emmerdale as Libby Charles. In 2019, she appeared in the Channel 4 drama series Ackley Bridge as Sian Oakes.

== Early life ==
Privately educated, Glaser went on to study the Meisner technique at the Actors' Temple in London. She is also a dancer.

== Filmography ==
Film
| Year | Title | Role | Notes |
|---|---|---|---|
| 2000 | The Parole Officer | Policewoman | |
| 2001 | The Engagement | Angie Myer | |
| 2002 | Unfair | Sarah | Short film |
| 2003 | The Life and Death of Peter Sellers | Jane | |
| 2005 | Two Girls | Natalie | Short film |
| 2006 | The Lizard Boy | Nurse | Short film |
| 2006 | Go My Way | Eleanor | Short film |
| 2007 | Timed | Charley | |
| 2008 | Frottage | Georgie | Short film |
| 2009 | It's Alive | Marnie | |
| 2010 | If You See Her Say Hello | Her | Short film |
| 2012 | Luck | Lucy | |
| 2012 | Synchronicity | Ella | Short film |
| 2012 | Hard Boiled Sweets | Porsche | |
| 2013 | The Hummingbird | Anna Ilyushina | Short film |
| 2015 | Fingers | Henrietta King | Short film |
| 2016 | The Interrogation of Olivia Donovan | News Announcer | Short film |
| 2016 | Eliminators | Stacey | |
| 2016 | Ghosted | Peaches | Short film |
| 2018 | Anemone | Ms Evans | Short film |

Television
| Year | Title | Role | Notes |
|---|---|---|---|
| 2004 | The Murder Room | Celia Mellock | BBC TV |
| 2004 | Caught in the Act | Debbie | Carousel Pictures |
| 2004 | Down To Earth | Jo | BBC TV - episode "Broken Dreams" |
| 2004 | Top Buzzer | Debbie | Worlds End Productions |
| 2005 | Einstein's Big Idea | Marie-Ann Paulse/Lavoisier | PBS/Nova |
| 2005 | Emmerdale | Libby Charles | Series regular, 67 episodes |
| 2005 | The Bobby Moore Story | Tina Moore | BBC TV |
| 2006 | My Family | Chloe | BBC TV |
| 2006 | Time of Your Life | Nurse | ITV TV |
| 2007 | The Bill | Vanessa | Talkback Thames - episode "Back from the brink" |
| 2007 | The IT Crowd | Nadine | Talkback Thames - episode "Calendar Geeks" |
| 2008 | Hotel Babylon | Lily | BBC TV |
| 2008 | Bones | Heather Miller | Fox Entertainment - episode "Yanks in the UK" |
| 2009 | Splendid | Various | Magician Pictures |
| 2009 | Casualty | Michelle | BBC TV - episode "No fjords in Finland" |
| 2010 | Above Suspicion | Louise Pennel | Main role |
| 2010 | Dappers | Faye | BBC TV |
| 2011 | Secret Diary of a Call Girl | DK | Tiger Aspect TV |
| 2013 | Holby City | Gemma Wilde | Regular role |
| 2018 | Father Brown | Tamara Reeves | 1 episode |
| 2019 | Ackley Bridge | Sian Oakes | Main role |
| 2019 | Deep Cuts | Rachel | |
