= Eric Rosswood =

American author and LGBTQ activist (born 1979)

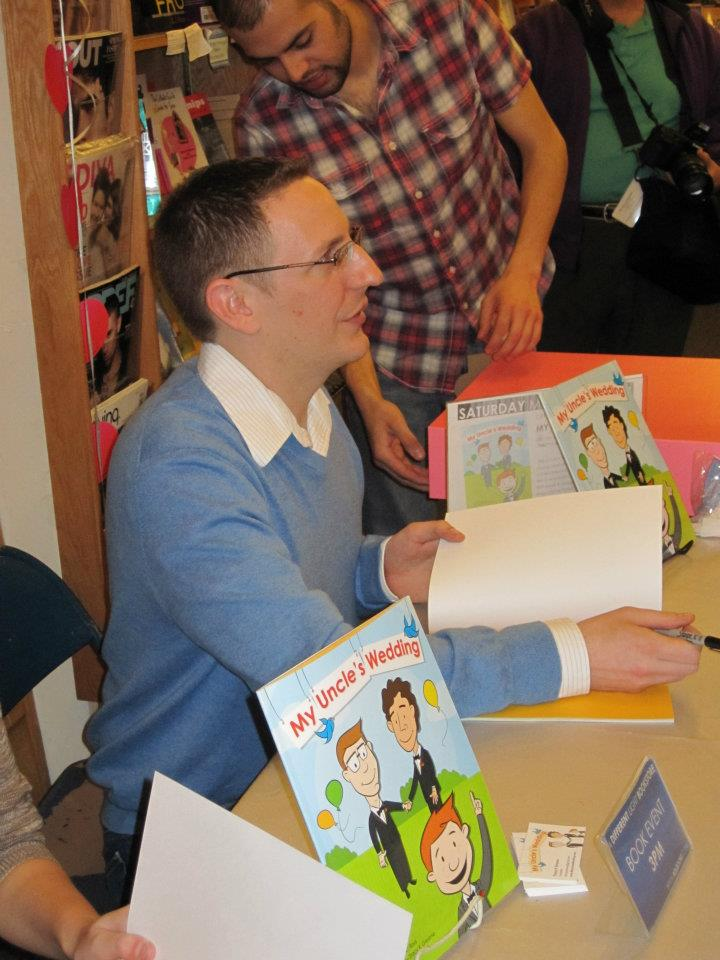
- Rosswood signing copies of My Uncle's Wedding at the book release
- Born: Eric Ross; October 12, 1979 (age 47)
- Citizenship: United States
- Occupations: LGBT activist, author
- Spouse: Mat Rosswood (né Wood)
- Children: 2
- Writing career
- Language: English
- Notable works: My Uncle's Wedding (2011); Journey to Same-Sex Parenthood (2016)
- Website: www.ericrosswood.com

Eric Rosswood (né Ross, born October 12, 1979) is an American author and LGBTQ activist, best known for writing books about parenting. As of 2022, he has released five books. He is the author of two children's books, starting with My Uncle's Wedding in 2011 and Strong in 2022. His parenting books include Journey to Same-Sex Parenthood in 2016 and The Ultimate Guide for Gay Dads in 2017. We Make It Better, released in 2018, is compilation of biographies on LGBTQ people.

== Books ==
=== My Uncle’s Wedding ===
My Uncle’s Wedding is a children's picture book about marriage equality. The main character is a boy named Andy who finds out that his uncle, Mike, is going to marry his long-term boyfriend, Steve. In the book, Andy talks about his uncle's wedding, how it affects him, and the things he gets to do in preparation for the ceremony. Tracy K. Greene created illustrations and the author is credited as Eric Ross instead of Eric Rosswood because he wrote and published the book prior to getting married and changing his last name.

Rosswood stated he intentionally left the word "gay" out of the book because the story was about a wedding, not a "gay wedding." My Uncle’s Wedding was praised by Marriage Equality USA and the National Center for Lesbian Rights. During the official book release, California Senator Mark Leno presented Rosswood with a Senate Certificate of Recognition for My Uncle's Wedding, stating the book's "vital role in creating a brighter future."

In various interviews, Rosswood explained that the reason he wrote My Uncle’s Wedding was because he didn't like how opponents of marriage equality would always use kids for political gain, so he decided to write about the topic from a child's perspective.

While the book was typically well received, the anti-LGBTQ group National Organization for Marriage (NOM) was quick to condemn it.

=== Journey to Same-Sex Parenthood ===
While trying to expand his own family, Rosswood realized there was a lack of resources available to help same-sex couples compare paths to parenthood. He wrote Journey to Same-Sex Parenthood to help same-sex couples start their own families. The book compares adoption, foster care, assisted reproduction, surrogacy, and co-parenting to help LGBTQ people decide which path is right for them. It includes 19 real life stories from parents around the world, including the United States, the UK, Ireland, and South Africa. One of the stories was written by a serodiscordant couple, and it is believed that Journey to Same-Sex Parenthood is the first book that gives an example for how a gay couple can have children when one of the prospective parents is HIV-positive.

The book also includes legal tips and advice contributed by the National Center for Lesbian Rights. Actress Melissa Gilbert wrote the foreword and Charlie Condou wrote the introduction.

=== The Ultimate Guide for Gay Dads ===
Rosswood's third book, The Ultimate Guide for Gay Dads, covers general parenting information, but instead of topics focusing on mothers, it highlights information relevant to gay dads. The book includes parenting tips and advice from pediatricians, school educators, lawyers, and other gay parents. The foreword was written by Golden Globe nominated writer, director, and producer Greg Berlanti, best known for his work as executive producer and co-creator of The CW’s Arrow. The audiobook is narrated by Paul Michael Garcia. The book became the #1 New Release in the Adoption category on Amazon. The book received positive responses from Shawn Moore, Board Member for the Modern Family Alliance, and Stan J. Sloan, CEO for The Family Equality Council. The Washington Blade called it a "generous resource."

=== We Make It Better ===
In 2018, Rosswood partnered with Kathleen Archambeau to write We Make It Better: The LGBTQ Community and their Positive Contributions to Society. The book is split into ten sections: activism, business, dance, film & television, government and military, music, religion, science, sports, and literature. It features many biographies, including Oscar Wilde, Emma González, Bayard Rustin, Lana and Lilly Wachowski, Leonard Matlovich, Jóhanna Sigurðardóttir, and Tim Cook. Kate Kendell, executive director of the National Center for Lesbian Rights, stated, "This book is sure to empower the next generation of LGBTQ youth to find their passions and transform the world."

=== Strong ===
Rosswood collaborated with American strongman Rob Kearney to write Strong, a children's book that tells Kearney's life as a gay strength athlete who learned to embrace his authentic self. The book is illustrated by Nidhi Chanani. Rosswood said that a book like Strong was needed when there were few LGBTQ+ role models in children's literature, especially in light of the recent "don't say gay" bill in Florida. The book was released on May 10, 2022. At a book signing in Pleasantville, New York, President Bill Clinton happened to come into the bookshop during the event. He called Rosswood's work "inspiring", further stating stories like Strong could "change the world." Publishers Weekly ran a photo of the two photographed together with Rosswood holding his book. Rosswood stated:

There are very few LGBTQ+ role models in children's literature and I think that needs to change. When I heard Rob's story, I thought this is something kids need to know about. They need to see openly queer people thriving and succeeding in life. Because when a young person sees another person like them achieving greatness, they think to themselves, I can do that too. And that's how we create positive change.

== Activism ==
In 1997, Rosswood started the first Gay Straight Alliance (GSA) at Orange Glen High School in Escondido, California where he went to school.

Rosswood has been an activist for LGBTQ equality and equal rights. In addition to starting a GSA at his high school, he was also a chapter leader for Marriage Equality USA and helped with grassroots activism in the fight against Prop 8, which took away marriage rights from same-sex couples.

He joined the board of San Francisco Pride in 2011 and stayed on for two years prior to stepping down before the birth of his son.

In 2017, when Heterosexual Pride Day was trending on Twitter, Rosswood tweeted the previously used phrase, "It's that time of year again when all the homophobic people complain about not having a #HeterosexualPrideDay and here's the annual response: "Gay Pride was not born of a need to celebrate being gay, but our right to exist without persecution. So instead of wondering why there isn't a Straight Pride movement, be thankful you don't need one."" That same year, author Kathleen Archambeau included Rosswood in her book Pride & Joy: LGBTQ Artists, Icons and Everyday Heroes for the work he has done for the LGBT community.

In January 2019, after Tulsi Gabbard announced she was running for the 2020 United States presidential election, Rosswood tweeted "Homophobic remarks from @TulsiGabbard resurface after announcing she’s running for president? Thank U, Next!"

Rosswood is now a commentator on LGBTQ issues, including civil rights, parenting, marriage, and politics. He has led panels on LGBTQ parenting issues for organizations such as the Family Equality Council and the Modern Family Alliance.

== Personal life ==
Rosswood and his husband, Mat, met at a salsa class in 2007. They were married at Disneyland in 2011. They combined their last names (Ross and Wood) to the portmanteau of Rosswood. They adopted their son, Connor, in 2013. In an interview with the Chicago Tribune, Rosswood stated he and his husband "encountered challenges not typically covered in basic parenting manuals" because they were same-sex parents. On January 8, 2019, the couple introduced their second child, a girl named Olivia Katherine.

== Bibliography ==
- Rosswood, Eric My Uncle's Wedding (2011) ISBN 978-1456531034
- --- Journey to Same-Sex Parenthood (2016) ISBN 978-0882825144
- --- The Ultimate Guide for Gay Dads (2017) ISBN 978-1633534919
- --- (with Kathleen Archambeau) We Make It Better (2018) ISBN 978-1633538207
- --- Strong (2022) ISBN 978-0316292900
