= Journey to Same-Sex Parenthood =

2016 book by Eric Rosswood

- Author: Eric Rosswood
- Language: English
- Subject: Same-sex parenthood
- Genre: Nonfiction
- Published: March 15, 2016
- Publisher: New Horizon Press
- Publication place: United States
- ISBN: 9780882825144

Journey to Same-Sex Parenthood is a nonfiction book by author and activist Eric Rosswood. The work focuses on adoption, foster care, assisted reproduction, surrogacy, and co-parenting advice for LGBT couples. The foreword is written by Melissa Gilbert and the introduction by Charlie Condou.

== Background ==
Rosswood, also the author of children's book My Uncle's Wedding, adopted a child with his husband after researching different parenting options for almost two years. They researched the differences between adoption, foster care, and surrogacy, eventually deciding on adoption. Speaking of the experience, Rosswood stated,

We found tons of technical information out there from the perspective of agencies and professionals, but it was difficult to find information from the perspective of people who went through the journey themselves. What went well? What went wrong? Now that you’ve been through the journey, is there anything you would have done differently? What advice would you give to others? And I didn’t just want these answers for one parenting path; I wanted answers for all of them so we could compare and decide which would be best for our own family. I couldn’t find a resource like that so I asked people to help me create one.

In an article for the Huffington Post, Rosswood wrote that he would like to "help LGBT people understand the pros and cons to the various paths to parenthood." That project eventually resulted in Journey to Same-Sex Parenthood: Firsthand Advice, Tips and Stories from Lesbian and Gay Couples, which was released March 15, 2016.

== Synopsis ==
The book is broken down into five main sections: adoption, foster care, assisted reproduction, surrogacy, and co-parenting. The real life experiences from 19 LGBT couples are included. Those couples came from the United States, the UK, Ireland, and South Africa.

The book also includes "legal issues worthy of consideration and other critical information", which were contributed by the National Center for Lesbian Rights.

== Reception ==
Publishers Weekly stated, "This supportive and helpful volume is full of warmth, encouragement, and advice, and it's a good place for prospective parents to start."

Dan Bucatinsky called the book "a collection of informative and inspiring stories about the journey into parenthood by a variety of couples whose riveting experiences will help anyone looking to grow their family!"

Gay San Diego stated "Journey to Same-Sex Parenthood: Firsthand Advice, Tips and Stories from Lesbian and Gay Couples is destined to be the resource book of the decade for LGBTQ couples."

Max Disposti, Executive Director of the North San Diego County LGBTQ Resource Center, stated,

This book is a valuable resource not only for those couples or individuals that are approaching parenthood, but also for LGBTQ service providers that want to become more aware of the challenges that same-sex couples face when making these decisions. Through real life experiences and passionate stories, this book is a true game changer. Once you've read it, I'm sure you'll be recommending it to everyone you know.

PFLAG NYC has listed Journey to Same-Sex Parenthood on their suggested reading list. Autostraddle included it on their list of "Books That Smash the Patriarchy".

It has also received accolades from activist Zach Wahls; actor Charlie Condou; New York State Assembly Member Daniel J. O'Donnell; singer Ian "H" Watkins; Judy Appel, Executive Director of Our Family Coalition; and Gabriel Blau, former Executive Director of the Family Equality Council.

The book has been compared to What to Expect When You're Expecting.

== Awards ==
Year	Organization	Award	Work	Source
2017	Readers' Favorite International Book Award Contest	Gold Medal for Best Parenting Book	Journey to Same-Sex Parenthood	
2017	American Book Fest	LGBTQ: Non-Fiction	Journey to Same-Sex Parenthood	
2017	International Book Awards	LGBTQ: Non-Fiction (Finalist)	Journey to Same-Sex Parenthood	
2017	The Independent Author Network	General Non-Fiction (Finalist)	Journey to Same-Sex Parenthood	
