= SaverLife =

SaverLife is a nonprofit financial technology company that works to create prosperity for low-income families. The organization's SaverLife platform provides cash prizes, rewards, articles from financial experts, gamified savings activities, and support to incentivize members to build a savings habit.

== History ==
=== Origins ===
SaverLife was originally founded as Earned Assets Resource Network, or EARN, in 2001 by a group including financier F. Warren Hellman, California State Senator Mark Leno, former Assistant Secretary of the U.S. Department of Housing and Urban Development Bob Friedman, San Francisco County Supervisor Roberta Achtenberg, San Francisco Foundation CEO Saundra Hernandez, and founding CEO, Ben Mangan.

The nonprofit created an Individual Development Account program and one of the country's first children's savings programs, Triple Boost.

=== 2015–present ===
Leigh Phillips became SaverLife's President & CEO in 2015. In 2017, EARN launched SaverLife, a free online platform designed to help people change their savings habits and build financial security. The platform provides financial incentives, insights, financial coaching, and prizes, to encourage members to save.

EARN changed its name to SaverLife in 2019, uniting its nonprofit services under the SaverLife banner.

SaverLife responded to the COVID-19 pandemic by transforming their online savings platform into a direct cash disbursement tool. By October 2020, the company had given $2.7 million in direct cash payments to its members and small businesses across America. SaverLife also published research on how people used these stimulus checks and tracked people's financial wellness during the pandemic. SaverLife research was used in research papers published by the National Bureau of Economic Research, the University of Chicago, and Columbia University's business school.

In the summer of 2020, SaverLife was chosen by the Bill & Melinda Gates Foundation as a Voices for Economic Opportunity Grand Challenge grant recipient.

SaverLife has continued to publish research with various partners including The Brookings Institution, the FINRA Investor Education Foundation, and the Financial Health Network.

== Products and services ==
The SaverLife platform provides incentives to encourage people to save money.

In 2019, SaverLife launched SaverLife Solutions, a custom integration of the SaverLife platform that employers, community-based organizations, and credit unions could offer as a benefit to help their employees build emergency savings. The program was launched with $1.5 million from Prudential Financial. To date, SaverLife Solutions has partnered with Levi Strauss's Red Tab Foundation, the KFC Foundation, Alorica, Concentrix, and United Way of Houston to provide a savings match to their employees.

The SaverLife Solutions platform has also been integrated into Intuit's Prosperity Hubs program and provided its savings platform to communities and employers in Bluefield, West Virginia and Johnstown, Pennsylvania. In 2020, Intuit announced an expanded partnership that will bring SaverLife's platform to Prosperity Hubs across the United States.
