= List of LGBTQ judges in the United States =

This is a list of openly LGBTQ Americans who are or were judges, magistrate judges, court commissioners, or administrative law judges in the United States and its federal district and territories. If known, it will be listed if a judge has served on multiple courts.

== Federal ==
=== United States courts of appeals ===
Name	Court	State	Start	End	Chief	Senior	Status	Appointer	Ref(s)
Todd Hughes	Federal	DC	September 24, 2013	present	—	—	Active	Barack Obama	
Patrick Bumatay	Ninth	CA	December 12, 2019	present	—	—	Active	Donald Trump	
Beth Robinson	Second	VT	November 5, 2021	present	—	—	Active	Joe Biden	
Alison Nathan	Second	NY	March 30, 2022	present	—	—	Active	Joe Biden	
Nicole Berner	Fourth	MD	March 19, 2024	present	—	—	Active	Joe Biden	

=== United States district courts ===
==== Article III judges ====
Name	Court	Start	End	Chief	Senior	Status	Appointer	Ref(s)
Vaughn Walker	N.D. Cal.	November 27, 1989	February 28, 2011	2004–2010	—	Retired	George H. W. Bush	
Deborah Batts	S.D.N.Y.	May 9, 1994	April 13, 2012	—	2012–2020	Deceased	Bill Clinton	
Martin Jenkins	N.D. Cal.	November 12, 1997	April 3, 2008	—	—	Resigned	Bill Clinton	
Paul Oetken	S.D.N.Y.	July 20, 2011	present	—	—	Active	Barack Obama	
Alison Nathan	S.D.N.Y.	October 17, 2011	March 31, 2022	—	—	Elevated	Barack Obama	
Michael Fitzgerald	C.D. Cal.	March 15, 2012	present	—	—	Active	Barack Obama	
Pamela Chen	E.D.N.Y.	March 5, 2013	present	—	—	Active	Barack Obama	
Michael McShane	D. Ore.	May 30, 2013	present	2024–present	—	Active	Barack Obama	
Nitza Quiñones Alejandro	E.D. Pa.	June 19, 2013	present	—	—	Active	Barack Obama	
Judith Levy	E.D. Mich.	March 14, 2014	present	—	—	Active	Barack Obama	
Darrin Gayles	S.D. Fla.	June 19, 2014	present	—	—	Active	Barack Obama	
Staci Yandle	S.D. Ill.	June 19, 2014	present	2026–present	—	Active	Barack Obama	
Robert Pitman	W.D. Tex.	December 19, 2014	present	—	—	Active	Barack Obama	
Mary Rowland	N.D. Ill.	August 20, 2019	present	—	—	Active	Donald Trump	
Charlotte Sweeney	D. Colo.	July 18, 2022	present	—	—	Active	Joe Biden	
Nina Morrison	E.D.N.Y.	August 11, 2022	present	—	—	Active	Joe Biden	
Daniel Calabretta	E.D. Cal.	February 21, 2023	present	—	—	Active	Joe Biden	
Ana Reyes	D.D.C.	February 21, 2023	present	—	—	Active	Joe Biden	
Gina Méndez-Miró	D.P.R.	February 24, 2023	present	—	—	Active	Joe Biden	
Jamar Walker	E.D. Va.	March 3, 2023	present	—	—	Active	Joe Biden	
Casey Pitts	N.D. Cal.	July 7, 2023	present	—	—	Active	Joe Biden	
Mary Kay Costello	E.D. Pa.	September 19, 2024	present	—	—	Active	Joe Biden	
Melissa DuBose	D.R.I.	January 2, 2025	present	—	—	Active	Joe Biden	

==== Magistrate judges ====
Name	Court	Start	End	State/ Territory	Status	Ref(s)
Ruben Brooks	S.D. Cal.	1993	2016	CA	Retired	
Allison Claire	E.D. Cal.	2012	present	CA	Active	
Mary Kay Costello	E.D. Pa.	2024	2024	PA	Elevated	
Seth Eichenholtz	E.D. N.Y.	2025	present	NY	Active	
Kailani Memmer	W.D. Va.	2023	present	VA	Active	
Mary Rowland	N.D. Ill.	2012	2019	IL	Elevated	
Donna Ryu	N.D. Cal.	2010	present	CA	Active	
Matthew Sharbaugh	D. D.C.	2024	present	DC	Active	

=== Article I tribunals ===
==== Specialty courts ====
Name	Court	Start	End	Chief	Senior	State/ Territory	Status	Appointer	Ref(s)
Joe Gale	Tax Court	1996	2011	—	—	DC	Retired	Bill Clinton	
Joe Gale	Tax Court	2011	2023	—	2023–2024	DC	Retired	Barack Obama	
Emily Hewitt	Court of Federal Claims	1998	2013	2009–2013	—	MD	Term Expired	Barack Obama	
Elaine Kaplan	Court of Federal Claims	2013	present	2021–2025	—	DC	Active	Barack Obama	

==== Agency judges ====
Name	Court	Start	End	State/ Territory	Status	Ref(s)
James Gilbert	United States Postal Service	2009	present	DC	Active	
William Kocol	National Labor Relations Board	1992	2013	DC	Deceased	
Maureen Tighe	Bankruptcy Court for the Central District of California	2003	present	CA	Active	

== State and Territorial ==
=== Supreme Courts ===
Name	Court	Start	End	Chief	State/ Territory	Status	Party	Appointer	Ref(s)
Shannon Bacon	New Mexico Supreme Court	2019	present	2022–2024	NM	Active	Democratic	Michelle Lujan Grisham	
Tony Cannataro	New York Court of Appeals	2021	present	2022–2023 (Note: Served as acting chief.)	NY	Active	Democratic	Andrew Cuomo	
Margaret Chutich	Minnesota Supreme Court	2016	2024	—	MN	Retired	—	Mark Dayton	
Benjamin Cruz	Guam Supreme Court	1997	2001	1999–2001	GU	Retired	Democratic	Carl Gutierrez	
Elspeth Cypher	Massachusetts Supreme Judicial Court	2017	2024	—	MA	Retired	Democratic	Charlie Baker	
Maggie Ellis	Texas Supreme Court	2027	Elect	—	TX	Incoming	Democratic	—	
Kelli Evans	California Supreme Court	2023	present	—	CA	Active	Democratic	Gavin Newsom	
Paul Feinman	New York Court of Appeals	2017	2021	—	NY	Deceased	Democratic	Andrew Cuomo	
Martin Jenkins	California Supreme Court	2020	2025	—	CA	Retired	Democratic	Gavin Newsom	
Rives Kistler	Oregon Supreme Court	2003	2018	—	OR	Retired	—	Ted Kulongoski	
Barbara Lenk	Massachusetts Supreme Judicial Court	2011	2020	2020	MA	Retired	—	Deval Patrick	
Virginia Linder	Oregon Supreme Court	2007	2016	—	OR	Retired	—	—	
Monica Márquez	Colorado Supreme Court	2010	present	2024–present	CO	Active	—	Bill Ritter	
Andrew McDonald	Connecticut Supreme Court	2013	present	2024	CT	Active	Democratic	Dan Malloy	
Sabrina McKenna	Hawaii Supreme Court	2011	present	2025–2026	HI	Active	—	Neil Abercrombie	
Lynn Nakamoto	Oregon Supreme Court	2016	2021	—	OR	Retired	—	Kate Brown	
Christina Nolan	Vermont Supreme Court	2026	present	—	VT	Active	Republican	Phil Scott	
Maite Oronoz Rodríguez	Puerto Rico Supreme Court	2014	present	2016–present	PR	Active	—	Alejandro García Padilla	
Beth Robinson	Vermont Supreme Court	2011	2021	—	VT	Elevated	—	Peter Shumlin	
Lidia Stiglich	Nevada Supreme Court	2016	present	2023–2024	NV	Active	Democratic	Brian Sandoval	
Helen Whitener	Washington Supreme Court	2020	present	—	WA	Active	—	Jay Inslee	
Gabrielle Wolohojian	Massachusetts Supreme Judicial Court	2024	present	—	MA	Active	—	Maura Healey	
Mary Yu	Washington Supreme Court	2014	2025	—	WA	Retired	—	Jay Inslee	

=== Appellate courts ===
Name	Court	Start	End	Chief	State/ Territory	Status	Party	Appointer	Ref(s)
John Arrowood	North Carolina Court of Appeals	2007	2009	—	NC	Lost Reelection	Democratic	Mike Easley	
John Arrowood	North Carolina Court of Appeals	2017	present	—	NC	Active	Democratic	Roy Cooper	
Laurie Earl	California Court of Appeal for the 3rd District	2022	present	2023–present	CA	Active	Democratic	Gavin Newsom	
Maggie Ellis	Texas Court of Appeals for the 3rd District	2025	2027	—	TX	Outgoing	Democratic	—	
Elizabeth Garry	New York Supreme Court Appellate Division for the 3rd Department	2009	present	2018–present	NY	Active	Democratic	David Paterson	
David Gass	Arizona Court of Appeals	2019	present	2023–2025	AZ	Active	Democratic	Doug Ducey	
Vickie Henry	Massachusetts Appeals Court	2015	present	—	MA	Active	—	Charlie Baker	
Jim Humes	California Court of Appeals for the 1st District	2012	present	2014–present	CA	Active	Democratic	Jerry Brown	
Andrew Jacobs	Arizona Court of Appeals	2023	present	—	AZ	Active	Democratic	Katie Hobbs	
Martin Jenkins	California Court of Appeals for the 1st District	2008	2019	—	CA	Elevated	Democratic	Arnold Schwarzenegger	
Marcy Kahn	New York Supreme Court Appellate Division for the 1st Department	2016	2019	—	NY	Retired	Democratic	Andrew Cuomo	
Rives Kistler	Oregon Court of Appeals	1993	2003	—	OR	Elevated	—	John Kitzhaber	
Luis Lavin	California Court of Appeal for the 2nd District	2015	2024	—	CA	Retired	Democratic	Jerry Brown	
Barbara Lenk	Massachusetts Appeals Court	1995	2011	—	MA	Elevated	—	Bill Weld	
Jodie Mooney	Oregon Court of Appeals	2019	2024	—	OR	Retired	—	Kate Brown	
Lawrence Mooney	Missouri Court of Appeals	1998	2019	2002–2003	MO	Retired	—	Mel Carnahan	
Lynn Nakamoto	Oregon Court of Appeals	2011	2016	—	OR	Elevated	—	Ted Kulongoski	
Rosalyn Richter	New York Supreme Court Appellate Division for the 1st Department	2009	2020	—	NY	Retired	Democratic	David Paterson	
Lynn Pickard	New Mexico Court of Appeals	1991	2008	—	NM	Retired	—	Bruce King	
Marsha Slough	California Court of Appeal for the 4th District	2015	2023	—	CA	Retired	Democratic	Gray Davis	
Charles Spain	Texas Court of Appeals for the 14th District	2019	2025	—	TX	Retired	Democratic	—	
Therese Stewart	California Court of Appeals for the 1st District	2014	present	2022–present	CA	Active	Democratic	Jerry Brown	
Linda Vanzi	New Mexico Court of Appeals	2008	2020	2017–2019	NM	Retired	Democratic	Bill Richardson	
Gregory Wells	Maryland Appellate Court	2019	present	2022–present	MD	Active	Democratic	Larry Hogan	
Gabrielle Wolohojian	Massachusetts Appeals Court	2008	2024	—	MA	Elevated	—	Deval Patrick	

=== Trial and other courts ===
Name	Court	State/ Territory	Status
Charles Adams	Santa Clara County Superior Court (2018–present)	CA	Active
Joel Agron	San Bernardino County Superior Court (2017–present)	CA	Active
Ronald E. Albers	San Francisco County Superior Court (2009–2017)	CA	Retired
Beth Allen	Fourth Judicial District Circuit Court (2013–present)	OR	Active
Daniel Anders	Philadelphia Court of Common Pleas (2007–present)	PA	Active
Carolyn Archbold	29th District Court (resigned in 2003)	MI	Deceased
Jim Arth	District Court of Travis County (associate) (2012–present)	TX	Active
Patricia C. Baca	346th District Court of El Paso County (2021–present)	TX	Active
Shawna S. Baker	Supreme Court of the Cherokee Nation (2020–present)	OK	Active
Shannon Baldwin	Harris County Criminal Court at Law 4 (2019–present)	TX	Active
John Paul Barnich	Houston Municipal Courts (1999–2007)	TX	Deceased
Mary Ann Bearden	Lane County Circuit Court (1998–2012)	OR	Inactive
Mary Bednar	New York City Family Court (1986–2015)	NY	Retired
Rachel Bell	Davidson County General Sessions Court (c. 2017)	TN	Active
Martha E. Bellinger	Los Angeles County Superior Court (2005–2011)	CA	Retired
Jerry Birdwell	195th District Court of Dallas County (1992)	TX	Term Expired
Peter E. Borkon	Alameda County Superior Court (2022–present)	CA	Active
Christopher W. Bowen	Contra Costa County Superior Court (2010–present)	CA	Active
Tim Bradbury	King County Superior Court (1995)	WA	Lost Reelection
Angela Bradstreet	San Francisco County Superior Court (2011–2022)	CA	Retired
Brett Blomme	Milwaukee County Children's Court (2020–2021)	WI	Suspended
David J. Breen	Boston Municipal Court (2015–present)	MA	Active
Daniel L. Brenner	Los Angeles County Superior Court (2012–2016)	CA	Deceased
Karen Burstein	New York City Family Court (1990–1994)	NY	Resigned
Ann M. Butchart	Philadelphia County Court of Common Pleas (2015–present)	PA	Active
Teresa Caffese	San Francisco County Superior Court (2017–present)	CA	Active
Victor Carlson	Alaska Superior Court (retired 1995)	AK	Retired
Audrey Carrion	Eighth Circuit Court for Baltimore City (1999–present)	MD	Active
Ronald Castorina	New York City Civil Court, Richmond County (2021); New York State Supreme Court, Richmond County (2022)	NY	Active
Mary A. Celeste	Denver County Court (2000–2010)	CO	Retired
Roger Chan	San Francisco County Superior Court (2016–present)	CA	Active
Ken Cheuvront	Encanto Justice Court (Justice of the Peace: 2019–present)	AZ	Active
Thomas R. Chiola	Illinois Circuit Court of Cook County (1994–2009)	IL	Retired
Daniel J. Clifford	Montgomery County Court of Common Pleas (2015–present)	PA	Active
Jeffrey S. Cohen-Laurie	Los Angeles County Superior Court (2019–present)	CA	Active
Linda Colfax	San Francisco County Superior Court (2010–present)	CA	Active
Kimberly E. Colwell	Alameda County Superior Court (2012–present)	CA	Active
Elena Condes	Alameda County Superior Court (2021–present)	CA	Active
Christopher Costa	District of Columbia Office of Administrative Hearings (2018–present)	DC	Active
Jason Cox	Harris County Probate Court No. 3 (2019–present)	TX	Active
Jake Cunningham	Oakland County Circuit Court (2019–present)	MI	Active
John Dalton	Kane County Court (2012–present)	IL	Active
Amy Dawson	Fourth Judicial District (Hennepin County) District Court (2014–present)	MN	Active
Jessica Delgado	Santa Clara County Superior Court (2021–present)	CA	Active
Marisa Demeo	Superior Court of the District of Columbia (2010–present)	DC	Active
Susan J. De Witt	Los Angeles County Superior Court (2019–present)	CA	Active
Mary Dolas	Fresno County Superior Court (2015–present)	CA	Active
Herb Donaldson	San Francisco County Superior Court (1983–1999)	CA	Deceased
Bonnie Dumanis	San Diego Municipal Court (1994–1998); San Diego County Superior Court (1998–2002)	CA	Resigned
Angela D. Duncan	Gwinnett County Superior Court (2020–present)	GA	Active
Laurie Earl	Superior Court of Sacramento County	CA	Active
Julie Emede	Santa Clara County Superior Court (2009–present)	CA	Active
John Ehrlich	8th Subcircuit Court (2012–present)	IL	Active
Jim Evans	District Court of Harris County (associate) (2017–present)	TX	Active
Kelli Evans	Alameda County Superior Court (2021–2023)	CA	Elevated
Richard Failla	New York City Criminal Court (1985–1993)	NY	Deceased
Tara Flanagan	Alameda County Superior Court (2013–present)	CA	Active
Abbe Fletman	Philadelphia Court of Common Pleas (2014–present)	PA	Active
Keith Kern Fong	Alameda County Superior Court (2021–present)	CA	Active
Idee Fox	Philadelphia Court of Common Pleas (1995–present)	PA	Active
Shannon Frison	Boston Municipal Court (2009–2013); Superior Court of Massachusetts (2013–present)	MA	Active
Phyllis Frye	Houston Municipal Courts (2010–2023)	TX	Retired
Sidney Galton	Multnomah County Circuit Court (1998–2005)	OR	Resigned
David B. Gass	Maricopa County Superior Court (2009–2019)	AZ	Active
Shelley Gaylord	Dane County Circuit Court (2003–2020)	WI	Retired
David Gernant	Multnomah County Circuit Court (1994–2006)	OR	Deceased
Linda Giles	Boston Municipal Court (1991–1998); Massachusetts Superior Court (1998–2021)	MA	Retired
Anthony Gipe	Kent Municipal Court (2019–present)	WA	Active
Don Gorton	Tax Counsel – Commonwealth of Massachusetts (1997–2008)	MA	Retired
Alyson A. Grine	Judicial District 15B (2021–present)	NC	Active
Stacy Hackenberg	Williamson County Justice of the Peace Precinct 4 (2019–2022)	TX	Term Expired
Dean Hansell	Los Angeles County Superior Court (2016–present)	CA	Active
Rebecca C. Hardie	Contra Costa County Superior Court (2010–present)	CA	Active
Barbara E. Hartle	Houston Municipal Courts (2006–2016)	TX	Retired
Paula Hepner	New York Family Court (1998–2012)	NY	Retired
Donna Hitchens	San Francisco County Superior Court (c. 1990–2010)	CA	Retired
Rand Hoch	Judge of Compensation Claims	FL	Retired
Cecilia Horan	Cook County Circuit Court (2017–present)	IL	Active
Mike Jacobs	DeKalb County Court (2015–present)	GA	Active
Martin Jenkins	Alameda County Municipal Court (1989–1992); Alameda County Superior Court (1992–1997)	CA	Elevated
Jan R. Jurden	Delaware Superior Court (2001–present)	DE	Active
Marcy Kahn	New York State Supreme Court (1994–2016)	NY	Elevated
Jonathan Karesh	San Mateo County Superior Court	CA	Active
Nancy J. Katz	Circuit Court of Cook County (1999–2017)	IL	Retired
Stuart Katz	Circuit Court of Cook County	IL	Retired
Steven E. Kirkland	Houston Municipal Courts (2001–2008); 215th District Court of Harris County (2009–2012); 334th District Court of Harris County (2012–2020)	TX	Term Expired
Carol Kuhnke	Washtenaw County Trial Court (2013–present)	MI	Active
Barry David Kohn	Los Angeles County Superior Court (Commissioner: 2000–2011)	CA	Deceased
Victoria Kolakowski	Alameda County Superior Court (2011–present)	CA	Active
Jim Kovach	Harris County Civil Court at Law No. 2 (2019–present)	TX	Active
Jerold Krieger	Los Angeles Municipal Court (1983–1988); Los Angeles County Superior Court (1998–2002)	CA	Deceased
Robert F. Kumor Jr.	Springfield District Court (retired in 2009)	MA	Deceased
Stephen Lachs	Los Angeles County Superior Court (Commissioner: 1975–1979, Judge: 1979–1999)	CA	Retired
Jonathon Lack	Alaska Superior Court (Family Court Master: 2007–2013); Thurston County Superior Court (Commissioner: 2013–2019); King County Superior Court (Commissioner: 2019–present)	AK; WA	Active
Mark Leban	Eleventh Judicial Circuit Court (2005–present)	FL	Active
Robert W. Lee	Broward County Circuit Court (1997–present)	FL	Active
Barbara Lenk	Massachusetts Superior Court (1993–1995)	MA	Elevated
Joan Lobis	New York County Supreme Court (2007–2020)	NY	Retired
Seth M. Marnin	New York State Court of Claims (2023–present)	NY	Active
Chris Mallios	Philadelphia Court of Common Pleas (2015–present)	PA	Active
Larnzell Martin Jr.	Prince George’s County, Maryland Circuit Court (1990–2016)	MD	Retired
Cira Martinez	Bronx Family Court (c. 1992–1999)	NY	Deceased
Mary Catherine Marubio	Cook County Circuit Court (2016–present)	IL	Active
Kevin M. McCarthy	San Francisco County Superior Court (1997–2012)	CA	Retired
Barbara McDermott	Philadelphia Court of Common Pleas (2011–present)	PA	Active
W. Kearse McGill	California State Bar Court (2016–present)	CA	Retired
Dermot Meagher	Boston Municipal Court (1989–2006)	MA	Retired
Beau Miller	190th District Court of Harris County (2019–present)	TX	Active
Jodie Mooney	Lane County Circuit Court (2011–2019)	OR	Active
Mary C. Morgan	San Francisco Municipal Court (1981–1993); San Francisco County Superior Court (2003–present)	CA	Active
Albert J. Mrozik Jr.	Asbury Park Municipal Court	NJ	Retired
Andi Mudryk	Sacramento County Superior Court (2022–present)	CA	Active
Tracey Nadzieja	Maricopa County Superior Court (Commissioner: 2018–present)	AZ	Active
Camille Neider	Second District Court (2017–present)	UT	Active
George A.W. Northrup	Dane County Circuit Court (c. 1985–1997)	WI	Deceased
Marco D. Nunez	Imperial County Superior Court (2016–present)	CA	Active
Jon Jay Olafson	2nd Judicial District, Denver District Court (2023–present)	CO	Active
T. "Tracey" Edward Page	Lake County Superior Court (1984–2000)	IN	Deceased
Tiffany Palmer	Court of Common Pleas of Philadelphia (2010–present)	PA	Active
Tonya Parker	116th District Court of Dallas County (2011–present)	TX	Active
Sebastian Patti	First District Appellate Court (1995–2018)	IL	retired
Cheryl A. Pellegrini	Marion County Circuit Court (2014–present)	OR	Active
Sheryl Pethers	Circuit Court of Cook County (elected 2004)	IL	Retired
Rosemary Pfeiffer	San Mateo County Superior Court (ret. 2012)	CA	Retired
Barbara Phelan	Sonoma County Superior Court (2018–present)	CA	Active
William Pocan	Milwaukee County Circuit Court (2006–present)	WI	Active
Jill Rose Quinn	Cook County Court (2020–present)	IL	Active
Joe Quinn	San Francisco County Superior Court (2015–present)	CA	Active
Tom Reardon	Alameda County Superior Court (c. 1998–present)	CA	Active
Judith Rice	Circuit Court of Cook County 7th sub-circuit (2014–present)	IL	Active
Randolf J. Rice	Santa Clara County Superior Court (appt. 2001)	CA	Deceased
Ronald Richter	New York City Family Court (2009–2011, 2014–2015)	NY	Inactive
Rosalyn Richter	New York City Criminal Court (1990–1996); New York Supreme Court for the 1st Department	NY	Elevated
Paula Rosenstein	San Diego County Superior Court (2012–present)	CA	Active
Kristin L. Rosi	California Department of Insurance (Administrative Law Judge)	CA	Active
David Rubin	San Diego County Superior Court (2006–present)	CA	Active
Robert J. Sandoval	Los Angeles County Superior Court (2001–2006)	CA	Deceased
Bentrish Satarzadeh	Alameda County Superior Court (Commissioner: 2018–present)	CA	Active
Rand Schrader	Los Angeles Municipal Court (1980–1993)	CA	Deceased
Karin S. Schwartz	Alameda County Superior Court (2019–present)	CA	Active
Ernesto Scorsone	Fayette County Circuit Court (2008–2021)	KY	Retired
Mark Scurti	District Court of Maryland for Baltimore City (2013–present)	MD	Active
Rudolph "Rudy" Serra	36th District Court (2004–2007)	MI	Term Expired
Victoria Sigler	Miami-Dade County Circuit Court (2000–present)	FL	Active
Debra Silber	King County Supreme Court (2016–present)	NY	Active
Jerry Simoneaux	Harris County Probate Court No. 1 (2019–present)	TX	Active
Sarah M. Singleton	First Judicial District Court of New Mexico (2009–2017)	NM	Deceased
Levander Smith Jr.	Cook County Circuit Court (2019–present)	IL	Active
Sandra Butler Smith	San Joaquin County Superior Court (retired c. 2002)	CA	Deceased
Michael Sonberg	Criminal Court of the City of New York (1991–2017)	NY	Retired
Charles A. Spain	Houston Municipal Courts (2010–2018)	TX	Retired
Rosie Speedlin Gonzalez	Bexar County Court at Law No. 13 (2018–2026)	TX	Resigned
Matthew St. George	Los Angeles County Superior Court (Commissioner: 2009–2019)	CA	Deceased
Fay Stetz-Waters	Linn County Circuit Court (2017–2018)	OR	Lost Reelection
Dylan Sullivan	El Dorado County Superior Court (2014–present)	CA	Active
Katherine Tennyson	Multnomah County Circuit Court (2002–2019)	OR	Retired
William Thom	New York State Court	NY	Retired
William L. Thomas	Eleventh Judicial Circuit (2012–present)	FL	Active
Tracy Thorne-Begland	Richmond Circuit Court (2013–present)	VA	Active
Matthew Titone	Richmond County Surrogate’s Court (2007–present)	NY	Active
Richard Tsai	New York City Civil Court (2017–present)	NY	Active
Margaret Walsh	Albany County Family Court, Third Department (2004–present)	NY	Active
Shane Vannatta	Fourth Judicial District of Montana (2019–present)	MT	Active
Javier Enrique Vargas	New York City Housing Court (2013-2015); New York Family Court (2015–2022); New York Court of Claims (2022–present)	NY	Active
Ray Warren	Superior Court of North Carolina	NC	Inactive
Joshua D. Wayser	Los Angeles County Superior Court (2015–present)	CA	Active
William E. Weinberger	Los Angeles County Superior Court (2022–present)	CA	Active
Halee F. Weinstein	District Court of Maryland (2002–present)	MD	Active
Michael Whitaker	Los Angeles County Superior Court (2014–present)	CA	Active
Helen Whitener	Pierce County Superior Court (2015–2020)	WA	Elevated
Janice Wilson	Multnomah County Circuit Court (1994–2013)	OR	Retired
Mary Wiseman	Montgomery County Court of Common Pleas (2007–present)	OH	Active
G. Keith Wisot	Los Angeles County Superior Court (1981–1994)	CA	Deceased
David Brett Woods	Denver District Juvenile Court (2009–present)	CO	Active
Jason Worth	Housing Court (Brooklyn Division)	NY	Deceased
Ellen Yacknin	City Court of Rochester, Fourth Department (2002–present)	NY	Active
Gregory Yorgey-Girdy	Philadelphia Municipal Court (2021–present)	PA	Active
David Young	Circuit Court of Miami Dade County (2000–2007, 2016)	FL	Active
Amy Zanelli	Lehigh County Court of Common Pleas (2021–present)	PA	Active
Zeke Zeidler	Los Angeles County Superior Court (2004–present)	CA	Active
Anna Fletcher	Hope Municipal Court (2020–present)	NM	Active

== See also ==
- List of African-American jurists
- List of Asian American jurists
- List of first minority male lawyers and judges in the United States
- List of first women lawyers and judges in the United States
- List of Hispanic and Latino American jurists
- List of Jewish American jurists
- List of LGBTQ politicians in the United States
- List of LGBT state supreme court justices in the United States
- List of Native American jurists
