= My Uncle's Wedding =

Book by Eric Rosswood

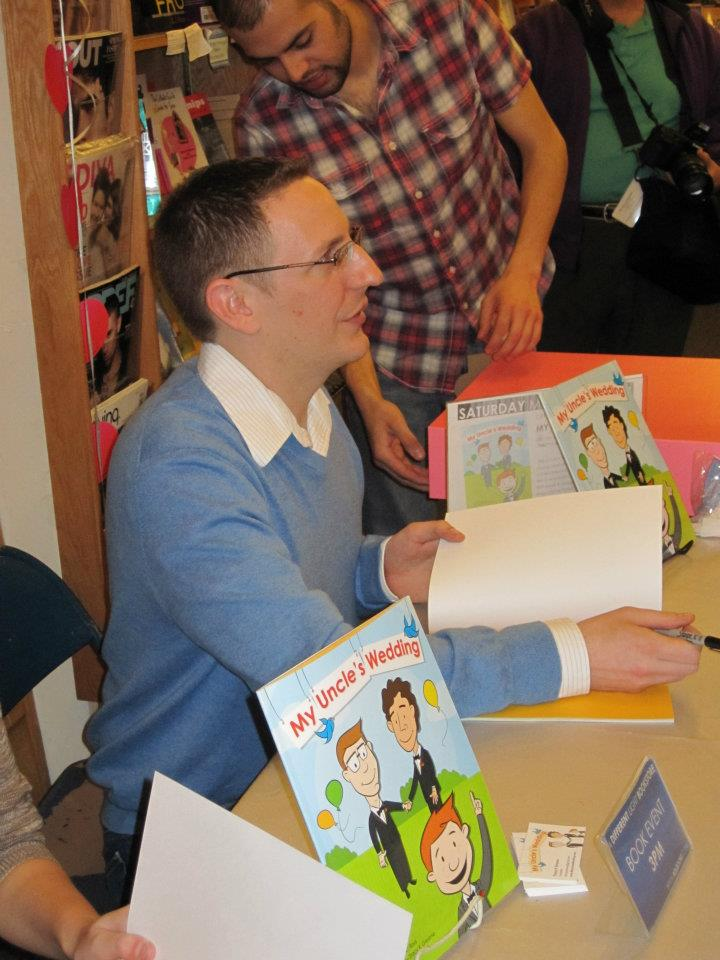
- First edition
- Author: Eric Rosswood
- Illustrator: Tracy K Greene
- Language: English
- Genre: Children's
- Publisher: CreateSpace Independent Publishing Platform
- Publication date: February 11, 2011
- Publication place: United States
- Pages: 34 pp

My Uncle's Wedding is a 2011 book written by Eric Rosswood, then using the name Eric Ross, designed to explain same-sex marriage to children. Inspiration for the book was derived from the author's experience of planning his own same-sex marriage. The book was written for children between the ages of 4-8.

== Background ==
My Uncle's Wedding is a children's novel published on February 11, 2011 by CreateSpace Independent Publishing Platform. The book was authored by Eric Rosswood, then known as Eric Ross, and illustrated by Tracy K Green. My Uncle's Wedding was Eric Rosswood's first of two children's books to involve the theme of homosexuality. while typically focusing on same sex marriage parenting novels, Eric Rosswood was influenced by his own marriage to display this experience to children through the experience of a child.

== Summary ==
My Uncle's Wedding follows Andy on his adventures as he shares his experiences preparing for his uncle's wedding. Andy's Uncle Mike will marry his partner Steve, and Andy is excited to be a part of all the preparations. With Uncle Mike and Steve tying the knot, there are many tasks that need to be completed. As the reader follows Andy along on this journey, they will experience themes of same-sex marriage, self-love, and acceptance.

== Reception ==
The book has not received any specific awards, however, it has been recognized by a number of people.

Since its release in 2011, My Uncle's Wedding has received consistent positive feedback. Senator Mark Leno has praised the book as a "conduit by which to bolster understanding" of the LGBTQ community, while writer and director Del Shores has described it as "wonderful" and "heartwarming."

The book was on Amazon.com's best seller list in the Gay and Lesbian section and the Family and Parenting section.

Kate Kendell, former Executive Director at the National Center for Lesbian Rights, described My Uncle’s Wedding as a great way to teach and introduce children that marriage is all about love and family.

Overall, the book did not receive as much attention as the author’s other books from the press and general public. His bestselling same-sex parenting novel, Journey to Same-Sex Parenthood, won multiple awards including IAN Book of the Year, the best Parenting book in the Readers’ Favorite Book Awards, and the best LGBTQ Non-fiction book in the International Best Book Awards.

== Analysis ==
According to reviewer Alan Chin, the book My Uncle's Wedding incorporates themes of love, equality, and acceptance, seeking to educate and broaden the perspectives of younger readers beyond its colorful pages.
