= Imani Rupert-Gordon =

American activist (born 1979)

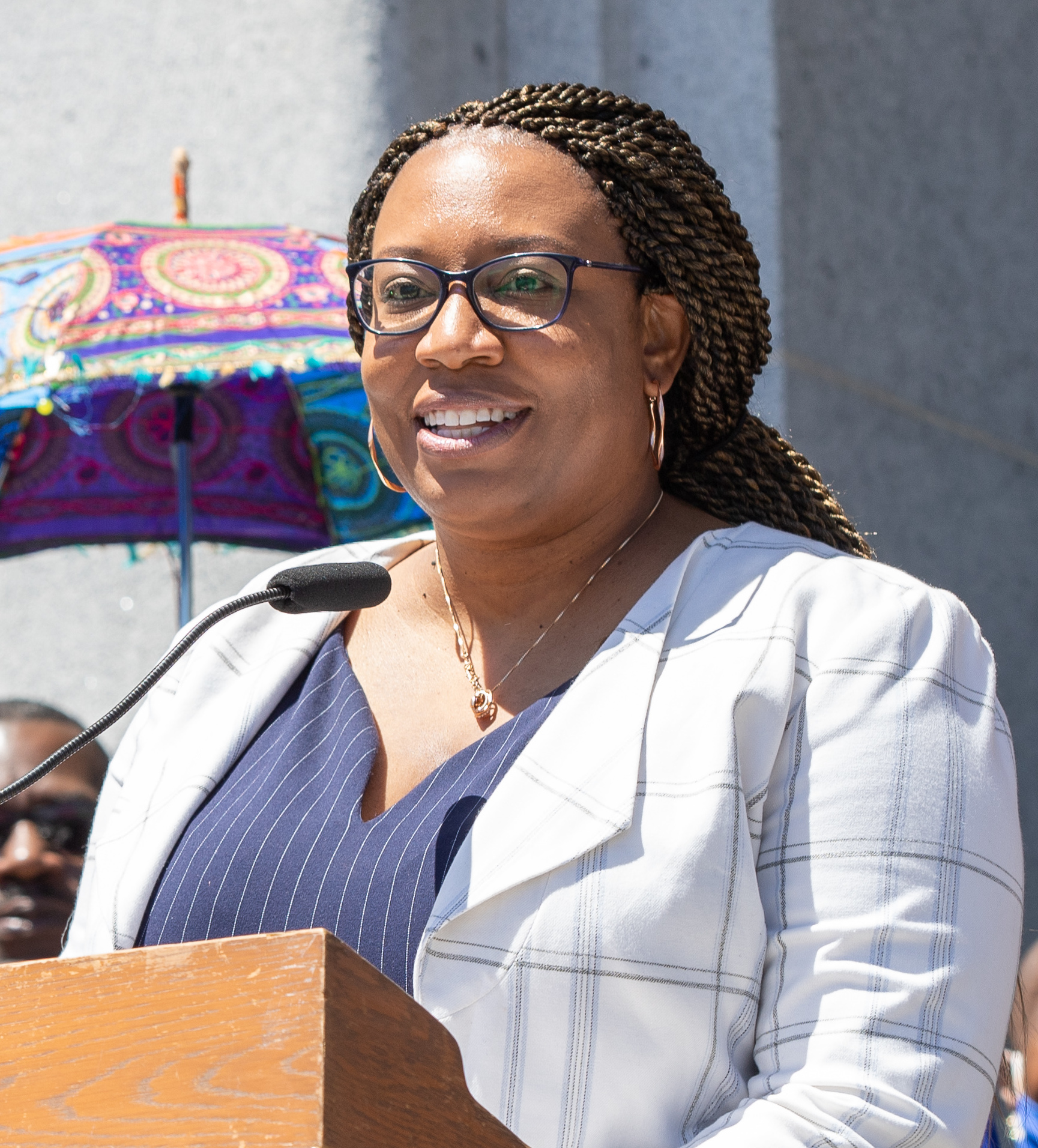
- Born: Imani Rupert; April 16, 1979 (age 47); Bedford Heights, Ohio, U.S.
- Education: University of California, Santa Barbara (BA); University of Chicago (MA)
- Spouse: Derah Rupert-Gordon
- Relatives: Maya Rupert (sister)

Imani Rupert-Gordon (born April 16, 1979) is the executive director of the National Center for LGBTQ Rights (formerly known as the National Center for Lesbian Rights) in San Francisco, California.

Rupert-Gordon was born in Bedford Heights, Ohio, and grew up in Yucca Valley, California. She attended the University of California, Santa Barbara, graduating with a bachelor's degree in sociology. She then worked at the University of California, Santa Cruz for eight years before moving to Chicago to attend graduate school. She earned a master's degree in social service administration from the University of Chicago in 2013.

Rupert-Gordon served as executive director of Affinity Community Services, a Chicago-based LGBTQ social justice organization focusing on Black women, from 2016 to 2020. In 2019, she was named the new executive director of the National Center for Lesbian Rights (NCLR), succeeding Kate Kendell. Rupert-Gordon began her directorship of NCLR in March 2020, working remotely from her home in Oakland, California due to the COVID-19 pandemic.

Rupert-Gordon lives with her wife Derah Rupert-Gordon, whom she married in 2015. Her sister, Maya Rupert, is a former policy strategist for NCLR.
