= John Doe v. Substack Inc =

Lawsuit in the San Francisco County Superior Court

- Court: San Francisco County Superior Court
- Full case name: MAURY BLACKMAN, an individual Plaintiff, v. SUBSTACK INC., a Delaware corporation; AMAZON WEB SERVICES, INC., a Delaware corporation; JACK POULSON, an individual; TECH INQUIRY, INC., a Delaware corporation; DOES 1-25, inclusive, Defendants.
- Decided: February 5, 2025

Ruling
- Court grants all defendants anti-SLAPP motions

Court membership
- Chief judge: Hon. Christine Van Aken

John Doe v. Substack Inc, CGC-24-618681 (2025), decided on February 5, 2025, was a lawsuit decided by the San Francisco County Superior Court, in which the court granted an Anti-SLAPP motion to the four named defendants regarding a defamation suit filed by the plaintiff, Maury Blackman. Blackman had sought $25 million from the defendants regarding an article written by Jack Poulson detailing his arrest on suspicion of domestic violence in 2021.

== Lawsuit ==
On September 14, 2023, journalist Jack Poulson published an article on his Substack, describing a sealed police report he had obtained from a source regarding the arrest of Premise Data's CEO, Maury Blackman. The article goes over the report, summarizing the police's account of a domestic violence incident, in which Blackman repeatedly hit his then girlfriend following a dispute. She later recanted her accusation, and the report was sealed by a California court in 2022. Following the release of the article, on October 3, 2024, a San Francisco city attorney demanded that the sealed incident report embedded in the article be taken down. After Poulson did not remove the report, on the same day, Blackburn filed a defamation lawsuit under a pseudonym against Substack, Amazon Web Services, Poulson, and his non-profit Tech Inquiry, requesting $25 million in punitive damages. On February 5, 2025, Judge Christine Van Aken decided in favor of the defendants. On July 29, 2025, the defendants' motions to recover attorney fees were granted.

== Media coverage ==
A majority of coverage regarding the lawsuit centered around Blackman's alleged attempts to get the article taken down. Poulson wrote in a update to his article that, "As a result of persistent attempts from an anonymous individual claiming to represent Maury Blackman to bribe the author into taking down this article... the report is now directly embedded in this article". Poulson received DMCA takedown requests from an unknown individual. Blackman sent complaints directly to Substack, causing the article to be "temporarily unpublished" until identifying information was removed. Along with this, the legal team of Premise Data demanded records on individuals that had filed public records requests for Blackman's arrest report.

In May 2025, two articles regarding Blackman's legal issues were temporarily removed by an unknown individual using a bug in Google's Refresh Outdated Content feature.
