= Maya Rupert =

American political strategist, writer, and advocate

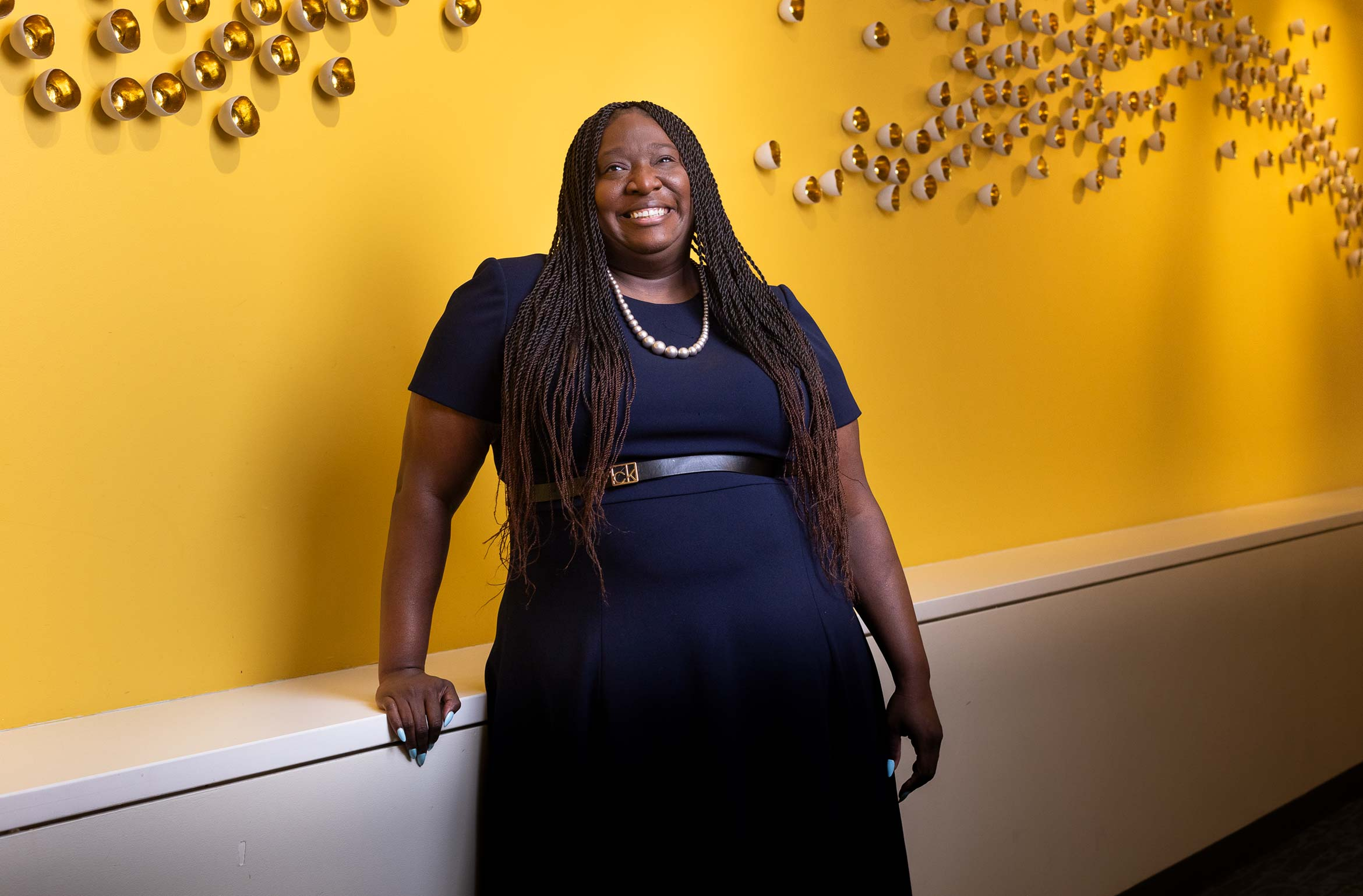
Maya Rupert, photographed at the Club and Guest House at UC Santa Barbara, where she was keynote speaker for a Women in Business luncheon.

Maya Rupert (born February 4, 1981) is an American political strategist, writer, and advocate. She was the campaign manager for Julian Castro in the 2020 presidential election and for Maya Wiley in the 2021 New York City Democratic mayoral primary.

She frequently writes about race, gender, culture, and politics, and has written for numerous publications including The New York Times, The Atlantic, Slate, Salon, and The Washington Post. Rupert contributed a piece to the anthology How I Resist: Activism and Hope for a New Generation, released in 2018. The collection of essays features pieces from celebrities and authors and all proceeds were donated to the ACLU. In 2026, her book, The Real Ones: How to Disrupt the Hidden Ways Racism Makes Us Less Authentic, was published by Dutton/Penguin Random House.

== Career ==
In August 2018, Rupert was named executive director of Opportunity First, a PAC founded by former Department of Housing and Urban Development Secretary Julián Castro. Before that, Rupert worked at the Center for Reproductive Rights as the Senior Director for Policy and managing director for the D.C. office. Prior to that, she was a Senior Policy Advisor for Secretary Castro at HUD. Before joining HUD, she was the Policy Director for the National Center for Lesbian Rights. Rupert has credited her sister as one of the reasons she worked in the LGBT movement. Previously, Rupert was an associate with Sidley Austin LLP in Los Angeles.

In January 2019, when Julián Castro announced his candidacy for President of the United States in 2020, Rupert was named his Campaign Manager, making her the third Black woman in history to run a presidential campaign. In January 2021, Rupert was named Senior Advisor to Elizabeth Warren's presidential campaign. She was later named campaign manager for Maya Wiley's campaign for mayor of New York City in the 2021 Democratic primary. Rupert was a Spring 2022 Resident Fellow at the Institute of Politics at Harvard Kennedy School. In 2024, she hosted a limited series podcast, When We Win with Maya Rupert, which was nominated for an NAACP Image Award. In 2025, she was a Vital Voices fellow. Currently, she is an Executive Vice President at Blue State and on the board of directors of both the National Women’s Law Center and Color of Change.

== Awards ==
Rupert's HuffPost blog was awarded a NABJ Salute to Excellence Award in 2012 and 2013 for her commentary. In 2017, her essay “This Cool Black Girl is Gone” was selected by Salon as one of the best essays of 2017.

In 2011, Rupert was named to The Root 100, which is the annual list published by the magazine of the “100 most important black influencers between the ages of 25 and 45.” She was also named to Ebony magazine's annual list of 100 most influential African Americans in 2011.

She was also recognized by The Root in 2013 as one of the “young leaders” of the civil rights movement as a part of its commemoration of the 50th anniversary of the March on Washington. In 2013, she was also honored by her alma mater U.C. Berkeley School of Law with the Thelton E. Henderson Social Justice Prize for her “commitment to…and creativity in developing legal strategies to advance social justice.”

== Personal life ==
Rupert grew up in Joshua Tree, California and attended Yucca Valley High School where she was Miss Yucca Valley 1998. In 2009, Rupert was temporarily removed from the Miss Yucca Valley website after voicing concern to then-pageant runners that the decision to hold the pageant at a private Christian high school that heavily campaigned for Prop 8 "might discourage lesbians or transgender girls from participating in the scholarship event." Rupert's name was ultimately returned to the website.

Rupert graduated from Berkeley Law School in 2006 and U.C. Santa Barbara in 2003.

Rupert lived and worked in San Antonio, Texas. Currently, she "lives in Washington, DC with her cats."

Her friend, Julian Casablancas, referred to her as his "dearest, sweetest friend" on The Lonely Island Podcast.

Her sister, Imani Rupert-Gordon, is the executive director of the National Center for Lesbian Rights. She is the former executive director of Affinity Community Services.
