= Donna Hitchens =

American lawyer, judge and activist (born 1947)

- Born: November 10, 1947 (age 78)
- Occupations: Superior Court Judge, San Francisco County
- Spouse: Nancy Davis (m. 2008)

Education
- Education: University of California, Berkeley Law

Philosophical work
- Institutions: National Center for Lesbian Rights

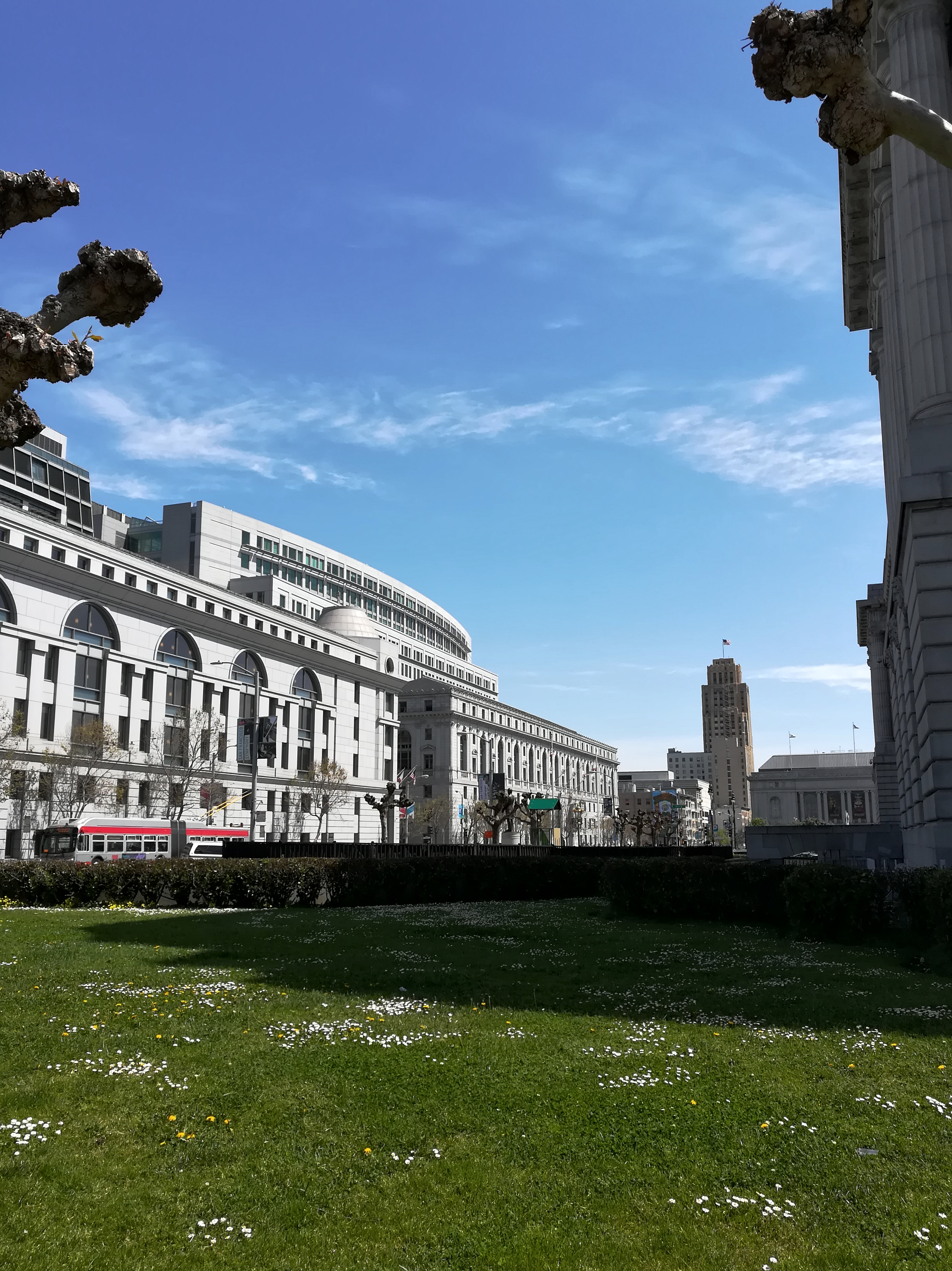
San Francisco Superior Court, where Hitchens served for 20 years.

Donna Hitchens (born November 10, 1947) is the first openly-gay elected female judge in the United States, and the founder of the National Center for Lesbian Rights. Through her work, she has campaigned openly for LGBT+ rights with a particular focus on lesbian rights, LGBT+ legal aid, and homosexual custody cases.

== Legal career ==
Hitchens was elected as a judge for the Superior Court in 1991, and has since worked in civil, criminal, juvenile and family courtrooms. During the 1991 San Francisco election campaigns, Hitchens worked alongside three other public defenders to unseat four superior court judges, receiving praise for being an openly gay woman during the campaign. Hitchens retired as a judge in 2010 after serving for 20 years, although continued to preside part-time over the children's courts in San Francisco. Hitchens has been nominated for a number of awards, including the 2001 Benjamin Aranda Access to Justice Award for improving legal access for low-income individuals and the 2002 Judicial Officer of the Year Award from the State Bar of California.

== Formation of the National Center for Lesbian Rights ==
In 1977, after graduating from Berkley School of Law, Hitchens, alongside other members of Equal Rights Advocates, received a grant from the Berkley Law Foundation to begin the Lesbian Rights Project. Hitchens aimed to use her legal expertise and personal experiences to support the legal rights of lesbians. Later, in 1988, the project became independent and was renamed the National Center for Lesbian Rights, which works today as a non-profit law firm aiming to provide free legal assistance to LGBT+ clients in the United States.

== Personal life ==
Hitchens was the first in her family to complete high school, before moving on to her legal career. Hitchens met her wife, Nancy Davis, whilst working with the Equal Rights Advocates. Hitchens and Davis married in 2008.

== See also ==
- List of LGBT jurists in the United States
