= Ronald E. Albers =

American judge

Judge of the San Francisco County Superior Court
- In office June 15, 2009 – February 3, 2017
- Appointed by: Arnold Schwarzenegger

Personal details
- Born: May 1, 1949 (age 77)
- Spouse: Colin Alexander
- Education: Cornell College (BA); University of Wisconsin Law School (JD)

Ronald E. Albers (born May 1, 1949) is a former judge of the San Francisco County Superior Court.

== Early life and education ==
Albers was born on May 1, 1949. He received a Bachelor of Arts degree from Cornell College in Mount Vernon, Iowa in 1971. Albers then attended the University of Wisconsin Law School and earned his Juris Doctor in 1974.

== Judicial service ==
A Democrat, Albers was selected on June 11, 2009 to serve on the San Francisco County Superior Court by Republican Governor Arnold Schwarzenegger. He was sworn in on June 15, 2009.

Albers is the first openly gay judge appointed by Schwarzenegger and is believed to be the first openly gay judge appointed by a Republican California governor.

On February 3, 2017, Albers retired from the San Francisco bench.

== Personal ==
Albers married his long-time partner, Colin Alexander, on June 17, 2008.

== See also ==
- List of LGBT jurists in the United States
