= Jim Humes =

American lawyer

James M. Humes, commonly known as Jim Humes, is an American lawyer from San Francisco, California. On November 21, 2012, governor Jerry Brown appointed Humes to the First District Court of Appeal, making Humes the first openly gay appellate judge in California history. He currently serves as presiding justice of the court's first division.

== Early life and legal career ==
Born in Iowa, Humes earned his Bachelor of Arts degree from Illinois State University, before completing a Master of Social Science degree at the University of Colorado and a Juris Doctor degree at the University of Denver.

Humes began his legal career as an associate at Jay Stuart Radetsky PC in 1983 before joining the office of the Colorado Attorney General in 1984. He briefly left the attorney general's office in 1986 to work in the private sector, before returning in 1987. In 1993, he moved to the California Department of Justice, serving in multiple positions over a 14-year career, including chief assistant of the civil division and senior assistant attorney general of the health, education and welfare section.

In 2007, newly elected attorney general Jerry Brown appointed Humes chief deputy attorney general, where he led a staff of 5,300, including 1,100 lawyers. He held the position until Brown left the attorney general's office on his election to the governorship in January 2011. Humes followed Brown to the governor's office, serving as executive secretary for legal affairs, administration and policy.

== Judicial career ==
On November 21, 2012, Brown announced that he was appointing Humes to the First District Court of Appeal, based in San Francisco. Humes filled the seat vacated by Justice Patricia Sepulveda, who had taken her retirement. Humes' nomination was confirmed by the Commission on Judicial Appointments on December 20, 2012. He was subsequently appointed presiding judge of the court's first division and confirmed in that role by the Commission on Judicial Appointments on July 17, 2014.

== Personal ==
Humes is openly gay, and was among the thousands who married in California during the six months in 2008 when same-sex marriage was permitted prior to the passage of Proposition 8, which would later be restored in Hollingsworth v. Perry (2013). He is the first openly gay appellate judge in California history and, as of December 31, 2012, the only openly gay appellate judge in California.

== See also ==
- California Courts of Appeal
- List of LGBT jurists in the United States
