= Mary C. Morgan =

American judge

Mary Carolyn Morgan

Judge of the San Francisco County Superior Court
- Incumbent
- Assumed office 2003
- Appointed by: Gray Davis
- Preceded by: Kevin V. Ryan

Judge of the San Francisco Municipal Court
- In office 1981–1993
- Appointed by: Jerry Brown

Personal details
- Domestic partner: Roberta Achtenberg (separated)
- Education: Smith College (B.A.); New York University School of Law (J.D.)

Mary Carolyn Morgan is a judge of the San Francisco County Superior Court and former judge of the San Francisco Municipal Court. She was the first openly lesbian judge appointed in the United States.

== Early life and education ==
Morgan received a B.A. from Smith College in 1967 and a J.D. from New York University School of Law in 1972.

== Career ==
From 1981 to 1993, Morgan served on the San Francisco Municipal Court. On April 3, 2003, Governor Gray Davis appointed Morgan to the San Francisco County Superior Court.

== Personal life ==
At the time of her appointment to the San Francisco County Superior Court, Morgan's partner was Roberta Achtenberg, who served as Assistant Secretary of the Department of Housing and Urban Development during the Clinton Administration. Senator Jesse Helms, who had referred to Achtenberg as "that damn lesbian", had held up Achtenberg's nomination and was particularly outraged at discovering that Achtenberg and Morgan had kissed during a gay pride parade.

== See also ==
- List of first women lawyers and judges in California
- List of first women lawyers and judges in the United States
- List of LGBT jurists in the United States
