= Tim Bradbury =

American judge

Judge of the King County Superior Court
- In office 1995
- Appointed by: Mike Lowry
- Preceded by: Arthur Piehler
- Succeeded by: Jeanette Burrage

Personal details
- Education: University of Chicago (JD)

Tim Bradbury is a former judge of the King County Superior Court. Bradbury was the first openly gay judge appointed in the state of Washington.

== Early life and education ==
Bradbury received a Juris Doctor from the University of Chicago Law School in 1972.

== Judicial service ==
On September 22, 1995, Washington Governor Mike Lowry selected Bradbury to replace retiring judge Arthur Piehler on the King County Superior Court. Bradbury joined the bench on October 10, 1995, but less than a month later lost the election to determine who would fill out the remainder of Piehler's term.

== See also ==
- List of LGBT jurists in the United States
