= Coalition of Activist Lesbians Australia =

Australian non-governmental organisation

The Coalition of Activist Lesbians Australia (CoAL) is an advocacy group established in 1994 to combat discrimination against lesbians, and the first lesbian non-government organisation to gain accreditation from the United Nations.

== Activities ==
COAL lobbies the Australian Commonwealth and other state and territory Governments to remove discrimination against lesbians. COAL lobbied at the UN 4th World Conference on Women, Beijing, 1995, and co-hosted the first international lesbian-space tent at the 1995 NGO Forum. Among a number of other organisations, COAL successfully lobbied for the Australian Government to sign the Optional Protocol to the Convention for the Elimination of All Forms of Discrimination Against Women (CEDAW). They are Australia's national lesbian advocacy organisation and the only United Nations accredited lesbian non-government organisation.

== See also ==
- LGBT rights in Australia
- List of LGBT rights organizations
- National Center for Lesbian Rights - national lesbian rights organization in the United States
- LGB Alliance Australia
- Women's Forum Australia
