= Murlene Randle =

American judge

Judge of the San Francisco County Superior Court
- Incumbent
- Assumed office November 2020
- Appointed by: Gavin Newsom
- Preceded by: Teri L. Jackson

Director of the Office of Criminal Justice for San Francisco
- In office January 2004 – January 2006
- Appointed by: Gavin Newsom
- Preceded by: Gregg W. Lowder
- Succeeded by: Allen Nance (acting)

Personal details
- Born: Murlene Johnson Randle; March 31, 1952 (age 74) Greenwood, Mississippi
- Party: Democratic
- Education: Jackson State University (B.S.); Santa Clara University (J.D.)

Murlene Johnson Randle (born March 31, 1952) is a judge of the San Francisco County Superior Court since 2020. She is the former Director of the Office of Criminal Justice for San Francisco and a Discrimination Attorney.

== Education ==
She graduated with a Bachelor of Science in Business Education from Jackson State University in 1973 and a Juris Doctor from Santa Clara University School of Law in 1980.

== Legal career ==
From 1996 to 2004 she was employed at the San Francisco District Attorney's Office where she served as Chief of the Sexual Assault and Child Abuse Units from 1996 to 1997, Chief Prosecutor of the Homicide Unit from 1997 to 2001, Chief of the Criminal Division from 2001 to 2003, and Chief Assistant District Attorney from 2003 to 2004.

In January 2004 she was appointed by Mayor Gavin Newsom to serve as the Director of the Mayor’s Office of Criminal Justice and served in that position until January 2006.

From January to August 2006 she was a Chief Labor Negotiator for the San Francisco Department of Human Resources.

From 2006 to 2020 she owned her own law firm and practiced law in San Francisco.

On November 13, 2020, Governor Gavin Newsom appointed Randle to be a judge of the San Francisco County Superior Court to fill the vacancy left by the elevation of Judge Teri L. Jackson to the California Courts of Appeal.

== See also ==
- List of African-American jurists
