= Jerry Birdwell =

American judge

Jerry R. Birdwell

Mayor of South Lake Tahoe, California
- In office 2008–2009
- Succeeded by: Kathay Lovell

Judge of Dallas County's 195th Judicial District Court
- In office May 29, 1992 – December 31, 1992
- Appointed by: Ann Richards
- Preceded by: Joe Kendell
- Succeeded by: John R. Nelms

Personal details
- Education: Baylor University (BA, JD)

Jerry R. Birdwell is the former mayor of South Lake Tahoe, California and judge of Dallas County's 195th Judicial District Court. Birdwell was the first openly gay judge appointed in Texas.

== Early life and education ==
Birdwell received a B.A. from Baylor University and a J.D. from Baylor Law School.

== Judicial service ==
On May 22, 1992, Governor Ann Richards appointed Birdwell to be judge of Dallas County's 195th Judicial District Court. She claimed that his sexual orientation was not a factor in his appointment, but gay rights groups promoted his appointment as a historical milestone, while Republican politicians called it a "slap in the face" to voters. Birdwell took office on May 29, 1992, but was defeated for reelection later that year by John R. Nelms after a homophobic campaign. Birdwell left office on December 31, 1992.

== Political career ==
In 2006, Birdwell began a four-year term on the city council of South Lake Tahoe, California. On December 9, 2008, Birdwell was elected to serve a one-year term as mayor of South Lake Tahoe.

== See also ==
- List of LGBT jurists in the United States
