= Roberta Achtenberg =

American politician (born 1950)

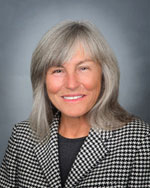
- Official portrait, 2011

Member of the San Francisco Board of Supervisors from the at-large district
- In office January 8, 1991 – June 2, 1993
- Preceded by: Wendy Nelder
- Succeeded by: Susan Leal

Assistant Secretary of Housing and Urban Development for Fair Housing and Equal Opportunity
- In office 1993–1995
- President: Bill Clinton
- Succeeded by: Susan Leal

Senior Advisor to the Secretary of the U.S Department of Housing and Urban Development
- In office 1995–1997
- President: Bill Clinton

Member of the United States Commission on Civil Rights
- In office 2011–2016
- President: Barack Obama

Personal details
- Born: July 20, 1950 (age 76) Los Angeles, California, U.S.
- Party: Democratic
- Spouse: David Chavkin (div. 1977)
- Domestic partner: Mary C. Morgan (separated)
- Children: 1
- Education: University of California, Berkeley (BA); University of Utah (JD)

Roberta Achtenberg (born July 20, 1950) is an American attorney and civil rights advocate who served as a commissioner on the United States Commission on Civil Rights. She was previously assistant secretary of the U.S. Department of Housing and Urban Development, becoming the first openly lesbian or gay public official in the United States whose appointment to a federal position was confirmed by the United States Senate. This confirmation hearing garnered a lot of publicity, opposition, and support.

Achtenberg went to school at different branches of the University of California and later attended the University of Utah. Before her political career, she worked as an attorney, director, educator, and founded organizations. Achtenberg is married with a son, and has been locally and nationally recognized with many awards and has made many publications throughout her career.

== Personal life ==
=== Early life ===
Achtenberg's father was Russian-Jewish and immigrated to the United States from the Soviet Union, while her mother was a Quebec-born of German origins. Both parents had minimal formal education. They owned a grocery store in Los Angeles and raised Roberta and her three siblings in California.

=== Education ===
After graduating from Morningside High School in Inglewood, California, Achtenberg attended University of California, Los Angeles, and then transferred to the University of California, Berkeley, and graduated in 1972 with a Bachelor of Arts in history. At Berkeley, she graduated Phi Beta Kappa. Achtenberg also met her ex-husband, David Chavkin at Berkeley. She began law school at University of California, Hastings College of the Law, before eventually receiving her Juris Doctor from the University of Utah in 1975.

=== Personal life ===
Roberta Achtenberg divorced from David Chavkin in a cordial manner in 1977, and soon after came out to her family as a lesbian. After Achtenberg came out publicly, she received national support and opposition. LGBTQ+ people and allies rallied in her support, and religious and conservative groups lobbied against her.

Achtenberg met her former partner, Mary Morgan, judge on the San Francisco Municipal Court, in 1979, and became partners in 1982. In 1985, Achtenberg and Morgan had a child named Benjamin. Achtenberg and Morgan were one of the most visible lesbian couples with a child at the time of Achtenberg's political career. During a San Francisco Gay and Lesbian Pride Parade, Achtenberg and Mary Morgan hugged and kissed while riding a float with their son, which generated controversy during her entrance to her federal political career. In 1995, Achtenberg gave a speech at the San Francisco Dyke March and Gay Pride March.

In 2015, she spoke at the University of Utah's S.J Quinney College of Law's Commencement ceremony.

== Career ==
Before becoming a public official, Achtenberg worked for more than 15 years as a civil rights attorney, public interest advocate, nonprofit director, and legal educator.

Between 1975 and 1976, she served as a teaching fellow at Stanford University Law School. In 1976, Achtenberg became the Dean of the New College of California School of Law. Achtenberg supported the LGBTQ community early in her political career. Her activity included co-founding the National Center for Lesbian Rights in 1977, along with Donna Hitchens. The center works for LGBTQ+ individuals, and provides them with legal services and counsel, advocacy, and education services.

Additionally, in 1978 Achtenberg represented LGBTQ rights while in the Anti-Sexism Committee for the National Lawyers Guild. While working for the organization, she edited Sexual Orientation and the Law (1985). One issue this project highlighted was making a guide for how to give lesbian and gay people appropriate representation. The paper outlines how to properly represent LGBTQ+ juveniles, how to tackle First Amendment issues regarding LGBTQ+ people or speech, and more.

Achtenberg has formerly worked at the Federal Home Loan Bank of San Francisco on the Board of Directors from 1997 to 2002 where she chaired the Affordable Housing Committee, and worked as a Staff Attorney for the Lesbian Rights Project of Equal Rights Advocates. In 2000, she became the Director of Andrew J. Wong, Inc., and has worked there since. In 2018 she was named to the Policy Transition team of Mayor of San Francisco, London Breed, to help address a variety of issues including LBGTQ policies.

She is the founder and a partner at ABK City Advisors, serves as a senior advisor at Lennar Corporation, and is the Vice Chair of the Board of Directors of the Bank of San Francisco.

== Political career ==
Achtenberg unsuccessfully ran for a seat in the 1988 California State Assembly special election to replace Art Agnos, losing to John Burton. She was elected as a member of the San Francisco Board of Supervisors in 1990, the first time that two lesbians (alongside Carole Migden) won seats to the board. In her tenure on the San Francisco Board of Supervisors, she worked on issues from individuals' rights to small businesses to making domestic violence shelters. While still serving on the Board of Supervisors in 1992, Achtenberg was appointed to the committee drafting the National Democratic Party's platform.

In 1993, she was appointed Assistant Secretary for the Office of Fair Housing and Equal Opportunity by President Bill Clinton, becoming the first 'out' LGBTQ person to be appointed and confirmed to a position within a cabinet office. In her role as Assistant Secretary, Achtenberg successfully integrated a previously all-white town in Vidor, Texas. There was Ku Klux Klan opposition to this public housing integration. Additionally, she worked to help find housing for displaced families due to a hurricane in 1994, and worked on improving fairness in the housing systems. Her group was also awarded Vice President Gore's Hammer Award. From 1995 to 1997, she was appointed as the senior advisor to the Secretary of United States Department of Housing and Urban Development. Achtenberg left the post in 1995 to run for mayor of San Francisco, and placed third behind Frank Jordan and Willie Brown (who would win in the runoff). From 1998 to 2004, Achtenberg helped develop the policies for both the San Francisco Chamber of Commerce and the San Francisco Center for Economic Development. She served as Senior Vice President for Public Policy at the San Francisco Chamber of Commerce until January 2005. In 2004, during her time as the Senior Vice President, she helped a same-sex couple, Phyllis Ann Lyon and Del Martin, obtain the first marriage license issued for a same-sex couple by San Francisco.

In 2000, she was appointed to the Board of Trustees of California State University by Governor Gray Davis, becoming chair of the board in May 2006, serving on the CSU Board of Trustees until 2015. Achtenberg served 16 years on the California State University Board of Trustees, serving two years as chair, where she developed the Access to Excellence Plan. Achtenberg also was crucial in the formation of the CSU Institute for Palliative Care, and was a member of the Palliative Care's National Advisory Board. Because of her extensive work with California State University, she was awarded a Doctor of Humane Letters.

Achtenberg was in charge of the Housing and Urban Development Department's Agency Review Team that assisted the Obama administration during its transition to office in 2008. On January 26, 2011, President Barack Obama named Achtenberg as a Commissioner for the United States Commission on Civil Rights. She served until 2016.

=== Assistant Secretary of Fair Housing and Equal Opportunity Nomination and Confirmation Hearing ===
Roberta Achtenberg was nominated by President Bill Clinton to be the Assistant Secretary of Fair Housing and Equal Opportunity in the Department of Housing and Urban Development. Her confirmation was announced during the lift of the ban on letting gay people in the military. Her confirmation hearing was held in front of the Senate's Committee on Banking, Housing, and Urban Affairs and started on April 29, 1993.

After debates lasting three days, including nine and a half hours of filibusters on May 19 and 20, Achtenberg was confirmed by the 103rd Senate on May 24, 1993, securing a vote of 58 YEAs to 31 NAYs, with 1 voting as present and 10 not voting. Roberta Achtenberg was the first openly LGBTQ+ individual to go through the senate confirmation process, and subsequently was the first LGBTQ+ individual to hold a federal position.

During the hearing, Achtenberg was questioned by many Senators, including Senators Faircloth, Boxer, and Bond. Throughout the process, she was loudly opposed by Senator Jesse Helms, who called her "a damn lesbian" that the Senate should refuse to confirm to the position. Achtenberg also received opposition from the Christian Action Network, due to her radical lesbian activism. Achtenberg received endorsements from many organizations and people, such as the National Fair Housing Alliance, San Francisco Bar Association, the National Association of Human Rights Workers, Senator Feinstein, and Congresswoman Pelosi.

She also expressed her own viewpoints and goals related to the position. Achtenberg stated that, in the role of Assistant Secretary, she would strive to eradicate housing discrimination and allow people to make free and fair choices surrounding their housing.

== Awards ==
- Advocate Article, a gay and lesbian magazine, named Achtenberg the Advocate's "Woman of the Year" in 1993.
- Awarded the Visibility Award in 1994 from GLAAD Media Awards
- Recognized five times as one of the "50 Most Influential Businesswomen" in the Bay Area by the San Francisco Business Times
- Awarded the Founders Award from the National Center for Lesbian Rights
- Awarded the Award of Excellence by the National Community Reinvestment Coalition
- Awarded "Woman of the Year" by the California State Senate for the Third District
- Declared Management Volunteer of the Year by the United Way, Bay Area
- Received the Southern California Women for Understanding Achievement Award
- Received the Women of Achievement Award from the National Organization for Women
- Received an honorary degree of Doctor of Humane Letters at California State University and California State University San Marcos
- In 2012, she was named by Equality Forum as one of their 31 Icons of LGBT History Month.
- In 2021, she was named a Pride Honoree by the California Legislature's LGBTQ Caucus in recognition of her pioneering advocacy work and for being the first openly LGBTQ person to hold a federal position.
- Was inducted into the LGBTQ Victory Institute's Hall of Fame as part of the Founding Class in 2021
- Recognized as #WomenWhoBuiltHUD by the Department of Housing and Urban Development in 2022 during Women's History Month

== Publications ==
- "Behavior Modification: Legal Limitations on Methods and Goals", 50 Notre Dame Lawyer 230 (1975)
- Sexual Orientation and the Law, by Roberta Achtenberg (editor) (1985) ISBN 978-0-87632-454-7
- "Partner Benefits Litigation: Expanding Definitions of the Family", Matthew bender Family Law Monthly (May 1987)
- The Adoptive and Foster Gay and Lesbian Parent, in Gay and Lesbian Parents, Bozett, Ed., Praeger Press (1987)
- Nicaragua's New Constitution: Report of August 1986 National Lawyers Guild Delegation to Nicaragua (May 1987)
- AIDS and Child Custody: A Guide to Advocacy, National Center for Lesbian Rights (1989)
- The Lesbian and Gay Book of Love and Marriage: Creating the Stories of Our Lives, by Paula Martinac, Roberta Achtenberg (contributor) (1998) ISBN 978-0-7679-0162-8
- Preserving and Protecting the Families of Lesbians and Gay Men, National Center for Lesbian Rights (1986, 1990)
- Lesbian Mother Litigation Manual, Second Edition, national Center for Lesbian Rights, with Donna Hitchens (1990)
- Protecting the Lesbian Family in Our Right to Love, Vida, Ed, (1990)
- Helping Gay and Lesbian Youth: New Policies, New Programs, New Practice, by Teresa Decrescenzo (editor), Roberta Achtenberg (contributor) (1994) ISBN 978-1-56023-057-1

Political offices
Preceded by Election was not district specific	Member of the San Francisco Board of Supervisors; 1990–1993	Succeeded by Susan Leal
