= Massachusetts Governor's Task Force on Hate Crimes =

The Governor's Task Force on Hate Crimes was an agency created by then-Governor William Weld, linking representatives of the state police and local law enforcement agencies with community advocates to further the state government's commitment to eradicating bias-motivated crime in the Commonwealth of Massachusetts. The Task Force was given permanent status by former Governor Paul Cellucci in 1998.

In 2003, Massachusetts Governor Mitt Romney vetoed a bill funding hate crimes prevention funding, after which he impounded money previously approved by former Governor Jane Swift for a bullying prevention program. The anti-bullying program was based on a 165-page guide, "Direct from the Field: A Guide to Bullying Prevention", which the Task Force intended to publish and make available to communities to provide guidance on implementing bullying prevention programs in middle schools and high schools. The editor of the bullying prevention manuscript was Don Gorton, who had been appointed chair of the Task Force by Weld in 1991.

The bullying prevention guide was ready in 2003, but according to Gorton, the $10,000 needed to publish it was not available. Mitt Romney, who was inaugurated as governor on January 2, 2003, eliminated all funds for hate crime prevention after taking office. The result was that the Task Force lost its staff. Gorton stayed on as co-chair of the Task Force and continued to nurse the anti-bullying project. The bullying prevention program continues to attract the ire of right-wing Christian activists, who attempt to equate it with the Anita Bryant canard that homosexuals are actively engaged in "recruiting" young people into their ranks.
