= Katherine Feinstein =

American administrator and former judge (born 1957)

Presiding Judge of the San Francisco County Superior Court
- In office 2010–2012
- Succeeded by: Cynthia Ming-mei Lee

Personal details
- Born: Katherine Anne Berman; July 31, 1957 (age 68) San Francisco, California, U.S.
- Spouse: Rick Mariano
- Children: 1
- Parent(s): Dianne Feinstein; Jack K. Berman
- Relatives: Leon Goldman (grandfather)
- Education: University of California, Berkeley (BA); University of California, Hastings (JD)

Katherine Anne Feinstein (born Berman; July 31, 1957) is an American attorney, public official, and former judge who currently serves as President of the San Francisco Fire Commission. Feinstein previously served as Presiding Judge of the San Francisco Superior Court from 2010 to 2012 and as a Superior Court judge from 2000 to 2012.

== Early life and education ==
Katherine Ann Feinstein is the only biological child of United States Senator Dianne Feinstein of California and her first husband, Judge Jack K. Berman. After her mother's marriage to Bertram Feinstein in 1962, she took her stepfather's last name. She is a graduate of the University of California, Berkeley (1980), and Hastings Law School (1984).

== Career ==
After working as a law clerk for the Ninth Circuit U.S. Court of Appeals, she served as a prosecutor and worked as a lawyer representing police officers accused of wrongdoing. She then took a job with the San Francisco city attorney's office where she represented children in abuse and custody cases. In 2000, California Governor Gray Davis appointed her to the San Francisco Superior Court. In 2012, she announced her retirement from the court, and Judge Cynthia Ming-mei Lee replaced her as presiding judge. During her career, Feinstein founded several initiatives including Squires, a "scared straight" program that matched juvenile delinquents with convicts serving life sentences at San Quentin State Prison; and a program that jailed drunks who skip their court dates unless they enter a treatment program.

In 2016, she was named by California Governor Jerry Brown to the Medical Board of California.

In 2020, San Francisco Mayor London Breed appointed Feinstein to the city's Fire Commission, which provides oversight of the San Francisco Fire Department. Feinstein currently serves as the commission's president.

== Personal life ==
She is married to Rick Mariano; they have one daughter, Eileen Feinstein Mariano. Eileen Feinstein Mariano was chosen as an Electoral College member for the 2016 United States presidential election.
