= Don Gorton =

American judge (1960–2022)

Don Eldridge Gorton III (May 4, 1960 – December 24, 2022) was a Massachusetts attorney who was a state tax judge from 1997 to 2008, and an advocate of LGBTQ+ rights.

== Biography ==
Gorton was born in Belzoni, Mississippi on May 4, 1960. He attended Humphreys Academy (1978), Boston University (1982) and Harvard Law (1985).

Gorton was an advocate for LGBT equality in Boston for over 25 years, and became the longtime co-chair of the Governor's Task Force on Hate Crime, to which he was appointed by then-Governor William Weld. The task force was given permanent status by former Governor Paul Cellucci in 1998. Gorton led the task force from 1991 until the body was disbanded by then-Massachusetts Governor Mitt Romney in 2003. He led the drafting of regulations to implement the Hate Crimes Reporting Act of 1990, and spearheaded civil rights awareness activities for the Executive Office of Public Safety.

Gorton also led the Greater Boston Lesbian/Gay Political Alliance (later the Lesbian, Gay, Bisexual, and Transgender Political Alliance of Massachusetts) from 1988 to 1994, and led the Anti-Violence Project of Massachusetts beginning in 1994. In the 21st century, he focused on anti-bullying advocacy. In addition to co-authoring an anti-bullying best practices guide Gorton played a leading role in the 50+ organization coalition that secured passage of comprehensive anti-bullying legislation in Massachusetts in 2010.

From 2008 to 2013, Gorton was active in the youth-led LGBT equality movement dubbed by the New York Times as "Stonewall 2.0." He served as an officer of Join the Impact MA. He was a long-time officer of and regular contributor to the Gay and Lesbian Review Worldwide. Gorton was elected Grand Marshal of the Boston LGBT Pride Parade in the 40th anniversary year of 2010, under the banner of "From Riots to Rights: 40 Years of Progress." In 2011, Gorton authored a research study of hate crimes against the transgender community, focusing on improved law enforcement responsiveness to this under reported phenomenon. He spoke out against the practice of "conversion therapy," which purports to turn gays into straights or change transgender identity. He co-chaired the coalition of organizations which successfully banned conversion therapy for minors in Massachusetts in 2019. He organized events for the Boston Pride Committee in Boston in 2019, for the Stonewall 50 observance.

Gorton died suddenly on December 24, 2022 while visiting family in Belzoni, Mississippi.

== Works ==
- Direct from the Field: A Guide to Bullying Prevention (co-author with Laura Parker-Roerden and David Rudewick), published by the Massachusetts Department of Public Health in 2008.
- "Anti-Transgender Hate Crimes: The Challenge for Law Enforcement," The Anti-Violence Project of Massachusetts 2011

== See also ==
- List of LGBT jurists in the United States
