= Marisa Demeo =

American judge (born 1966)

Marisa J. Demeo

Associate Judge of the Superior Court of the District of Columbia
- Incumbent
- Assumed office May 10, 2010
- Appointed by: Barack Obama
- Preceded by: Rufus G. King III

Magistrate Judge of the Superior Court of the District of Columbia
- In office 2007 – May 10, 2010

Personal details
- Born: August 23, 1966 (age 60) Washington, D.C., U.S.
- Education: Princeton University (BA); New York University (JD)

Marisa J. Demeo (born August 23, 1966) is an associate judge of the Superior Court of the District of Columbia.

== Early life and education ==
Demeo was born in Washington, D.C. She received a Bachelor of Arts degree in Politics with a concentration in Latin American studies from Princeton University in 1988 and a Juris Doctor from the New York University School of Law in 1993. Demeo then worked in the Civil Rights Division of the Department of Justice for four years. She then worked at the Mexican American Legal Defense and Educational Fund from 1997 until 2004, when she joined the United States Attorney's Office for the District of Columbia (USAO) as an Assistant United States Attorney, where she prosecuted criminal cases.

== Judicial service ==
In 2007, Demeo was appointed to be a magistrate judge on the Superior Court of the District of Columbia.

On March 24, 2009, President Barack Obama nominated Demeo to be an associate judge on the Superior Court of the District of Columbia. Demeo's nomination drew opposition from Republican senators due to her opposition of Miguel Estrada's nomination to the United States Court of Appeals for the District of Columbia Circuit, her work for the Mexican American Legal Defense and Educational Fund, and her support of same-sex marriage. On April 20, 2010, Demeo was confirmed by the United States Senate by a 66–32 vote.

On February 14, 2025, the District of Columbia Commission on Judicial Disabilities and Tenure announced that it had issued its Evaluation Report on the Reappointment of the Honorable Marisa J. Demeo to President Donald J. Trump. The Commission voted unanimously that Demeo was "well qualified" (the highest rating possible), resulting in the automatic renewal of her term (ending April 20, 2025) for another 15 years.

== See also ==
- List of Hispanic and Latino American jurists
- List of LGBT jurists in the United States
