= San Francisco County Superior Court =

California superior court with jurisdiction over San Francisco

Superior Court of California, County of San Francisco
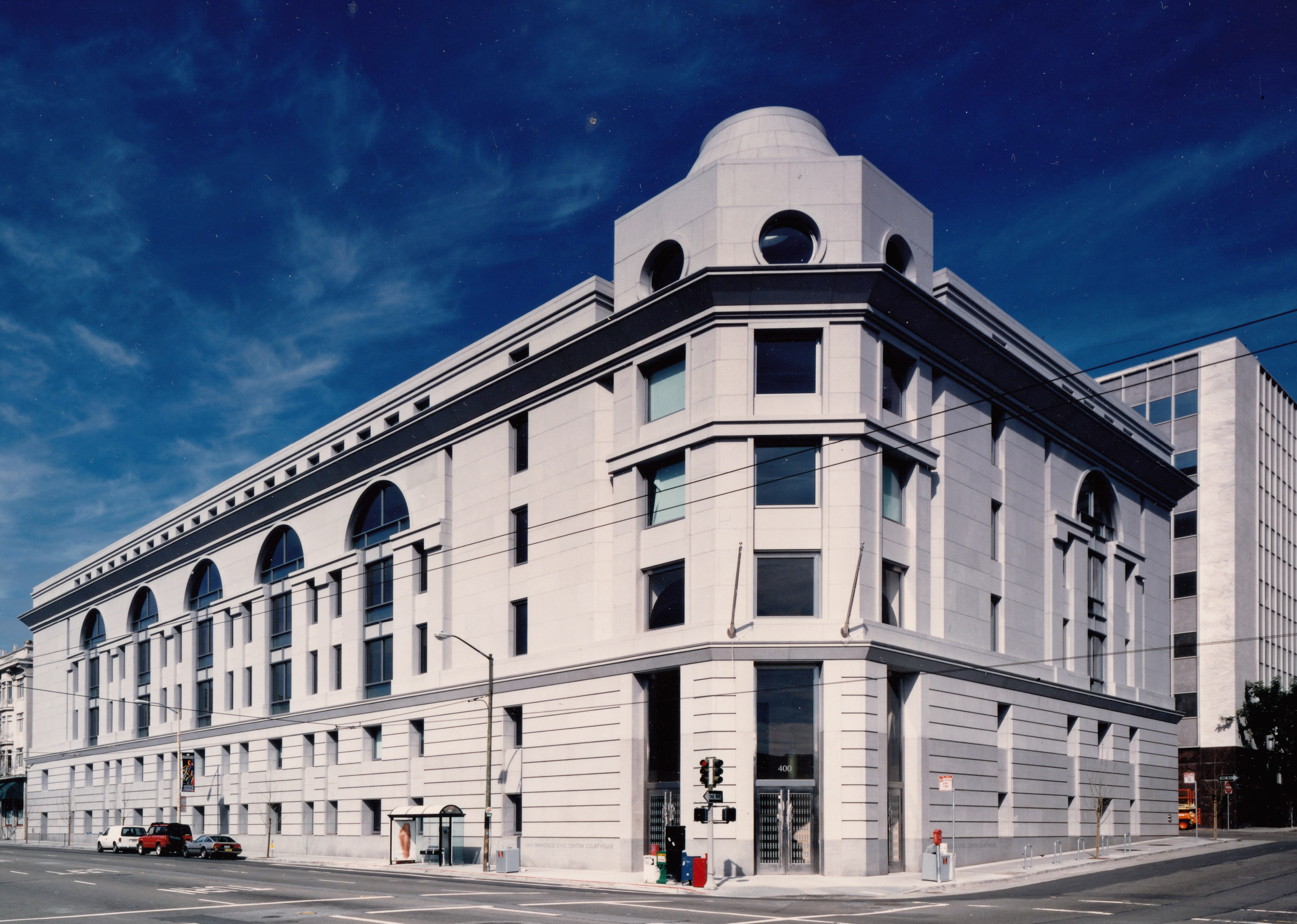
- View of trial court, Superior Court for San Francisco County
- Interactive map of Superior Court of California, County of San Francisco
- 37.781°N 122.419°W
- Established: 1880 (Note: The Superior Court was established with the new state constitution ratified on May 7, 1879. Its 12 judges were elected later that year and sworn in the following January. County and district courts had previously existed in the city since 1850.)
- Jurisdiction: San Francisco
- Location: San Francisco
- Coordinates: 37.781°N 122.419°W
- Appeals to: California Court of Appeal for the First District
- Website: sf.courts.ca.gov

Presiding Judge
- Currently: Hon. Rochelle C. East
- Since: Jan 1, 2025
- Lead position ends: Dec 31, 2026

Assistant Presiding Judge
- Currently: Hon. Christopher C. Hite
- Since: Jan 1, 2025
- Lead position ends: Dec 31, 2026

Court Executive Officer
- Currently: Brandon E. Riley
- Since: May 2023

The Superior Court of California, County of San Francisco is the California state superior court with jurisdiction over the City and County of San Francisco. Courthouse functions were incorporated into San Francisco City Hall prior to 1997.

== History ==
=== History of the court ===
The Superior Court of San Francisco at the date of its organization, 1880

On May 7, 1879, California voted to adopt a new constitution that significantly restructured the state government. One of its provisions called for the abolition of the county and district courts, which were replaced by a Superior Court in each county. San Francisco was allotted 12 judges for its Superior Court, who were elected (half as Republicans and the other half on a Democratic-Workingmen's ticket) that September and sworn in on January 5, 1880. That day, without any cases to be tried yet, the court's first official act was to adjourn and go to have their pictures taken by Bradley & Rulofson.

=== History of the courthouse and justice in San Francisco ===
The village of Yerba Buena, seized by Commodore John D. Sloat in July 1846, was renamed to San Francisco in January 1847. Initially, the Custom House on Brenham Place and Washington Street was used for municipal offices.

With the influx of immigrants seeking gold during the California Gold Rush in 1849, the population swelled and a nativist gang calling themselves The Hounds began harassing Spanish-American immigrants. The first court system was organized after a public meeting on July 16, 1849, demanding the Hounds be brought to justice; the leaders were put on trial and sentenced to ten years imprisonment and the leaderless organization dissolved shortly thereafter. Subsequently, planning began for the first California Constitutional Convention and a local election was held on August 1, 1849, naming ten delegates; these men were advised by John W. Geary, the recently elected First Alcalde (equivalent to the mayor), that "in the absence of any state legislative authority, they were supreme in the district" as the ayuntamiento (town council, equivalent to the modern San Francisco Board of Supervisors).

After the first state constitution was adopted, a city charter was passed in the state legislature and a subsequent election in May 1850 saw Geary elected as the first mayor. The city offices had outgrown the Custom House and the Graham House, built initially as a four-storey hotel on the northwest corner of Kearny and Pacific, was purchased for US$150,000 (equivalent to $5,805,000 in 2025) to serve as the new City Hall. Members of a group that previously had held a vigilante justice trial in February 1851 continued the legacy of the Hounds, later forming the San Francisco Committee of Vigilance in June 1851. The Graham House was destroyed during the fifth "great fire" of June 22, 1851, and the former Jenny Lind Theater was purchased in 1852 for US$200,000 (equivalent to $7,740,000 in 2025) to serve as a replacement city hall and courthouse.

Gold mine production peaked during the winter of 1852–53 and many miners left the city; by 1855, the population boom and bust had produced what historian John Hittell called "a greater depth of [political] corruption in San Francisco than in any other part of the United States. The people were new-comers, not long acquainted with their leading men, and their officials were selected at random." Notable failures of justice, including the fraud of Henry Meiggs and the murder of James King of William, led to the revival of the Committee of Vigilance in May 1856, which subsequently was dissolved that August.

Yerba Buena Cemetery, the city cemetery in the 1850s, bounded by Market street, Larkin street, and McAllister street, re-purposed and renamed Yerba Buena Square, was situated at today's Civic Center. In November 1867, the California Academy of Natural Sciences was denied expansion at this 16-acre plot. And later was granted 0.86 acres of land on Arguello Boulevard (then, First Avenue).

In 1870, Yerba Buena Square, was graded to prepare for the construction of the first purpose-built City Hall. Plans from Augustus Laver were selected and construction began in 1871 but the building was not completed until a quarter-century later, in 1895. As historian John P. Young wrote in 1912, "The cost as originally estimated was quite modest, but there were plenty of critics who declared that it would be largely exceeded. The most pessimistic, however, did not even remotely approach the truth in making their guesses." It was destroyed during the April 1906 San Francisco earthquake and subsequent fire.

=== Modern history ===
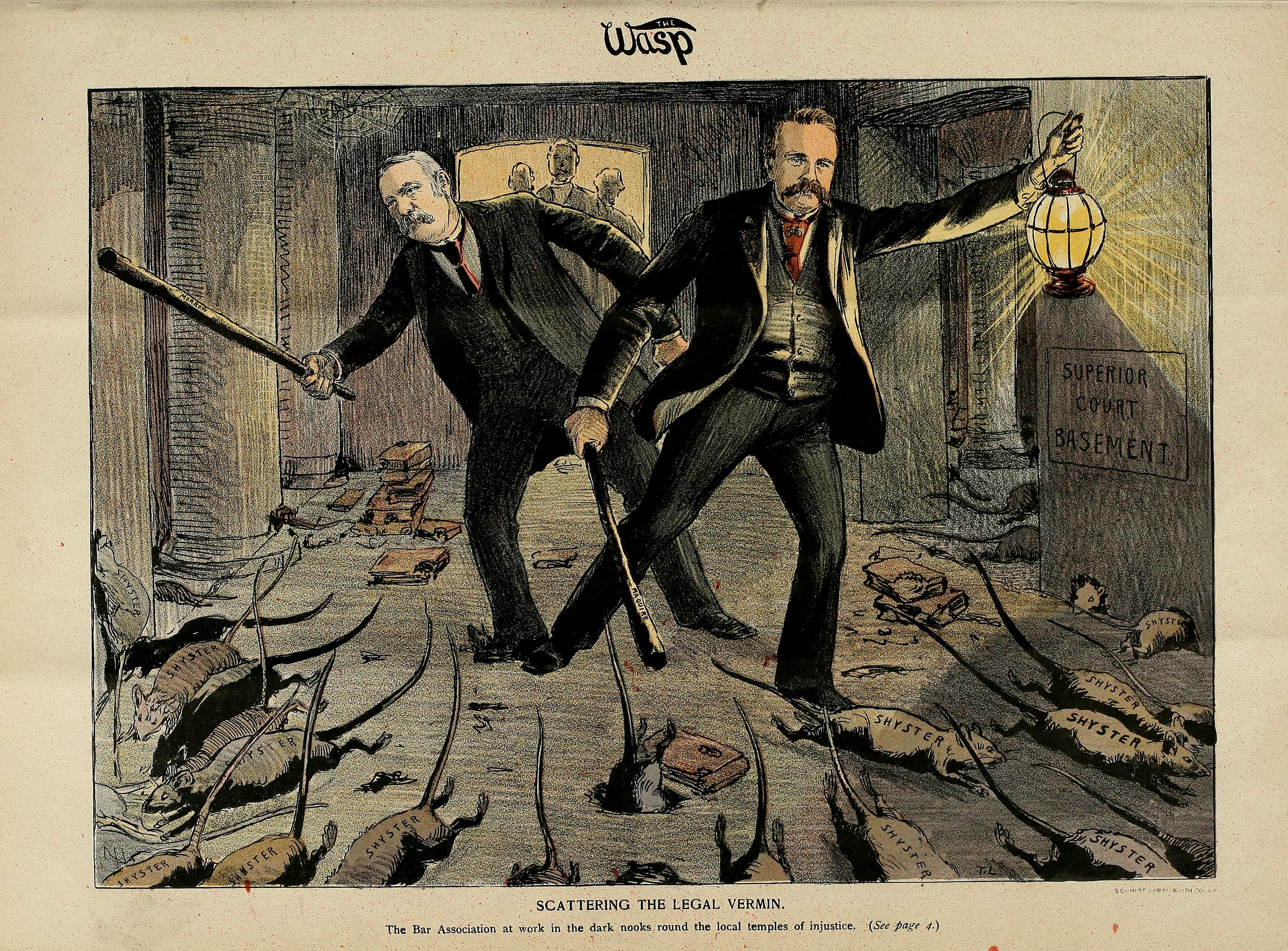
"Scattering The Legal Vermin," a political cartoon published in The Wasp depicting the efforts of San Francisco Bar Association members William W. Morrow and James G. Maguire to rid the Superior Court of "shysters," February 11, 1893

In 1976 the court helped to create the San Francisco Pretrial Diversion Project, a nonprofit organization that helps to provide alternative punishments for misdemeanors and parking violations, in an attempt to divert petty offenders from overcrowded courtrooms.

In 2000, a pilot Complex Civil Litigation Program was established in San Francisco's Superior Court, which has since been made permanent.

As of August 2024, the court was so overwhelmed with criminal cases (due to the aftermath of the COVID-19 pandemic) that it had no choice but to dismiss 70 misdemeanor cases due to the unavailability of judges and courtrooms to hold speedy trials. One of the cases thus dismissed was a misdemeanor vehicular manslaughter case arising from a May 2022 crash which killed two Florida tourists.

=== Judges ===
Katherine Feinstein (daughter of Senator Dianne Feinstein) had been the presiding judge of the court from 2011 through 2012. Judge Cynthia Ming-Mei Lee was elected the new presiding judge on June 27, 2012. The court is composed of 52 judges and twelve commissioners. The court currently has two commissioners.

In December 2016, John Stewart, chief judge at the court, discarded 66,000 arrest warrants for criminal infractions, like sleeping on the sidewalk, public urination, and public drunkenness, stating "You're putting somebody in jail because they're poor and can't pay a fine. We got a lot of criticism, but we thought it was the right thing to do."

- Jeremiah F. Sullivan (1880–1889)
- James V. Coffey (1882–1919)
- James G. Maguire (1883–1889)
- William T. Wallace (1887–1899)
- Joseph P. Hoge (1889–1891)
- James McMillan Shafter (1889–1891)
- Isaac S. Belcher (1893–1894)
- Carroll Cook (1897–1909)
- William P. Lawlor (1898–1915)
- M. C. Sloss (1901–1906)
- Frank Henry Kerrigan (1901–1907)
- Theresa Meikle (1943–1960)
- William Thomas Sweigert (1949–1959)
- Harry W. Low (1974–1982)
- Herb Donaldson (1983–1999)
- Donna Hitchens (1991–2010)
- Dorothy von Beroldingen (1998–1999)
- Katherine Feinstein (2000–2012)
- Mary C. Morgan (2003–)
- Ronald E. Albers (2009–2017)
- Gerardo Sandoval (2009–2026)
- Rita F. Lin (2018–2023)
- Murlene Randle (2020–)

== Venue ==
San Francisco Superior Court locations:
1 Civic Center, 400 McAllister St
2 Hall of Justice, 850 Bryant St
3 Polk Street Annex, 575 Polk St
4 Juvenile Justice Center, 375 Woodside Ave

Courthouse functions were incorporated into San Francisco City Hall prior to 1997.

The courthouse for the San Francisco County Superior Court is located at 400 McAllister St, San Francisco, CA 94102. It was opened on December 9, 1997. The building was designed by Lee/Timchula Architects. The local architect was Cavagnero and Associates.

The entrance features fabricated metal doors designed by sculptor Albert Paley.

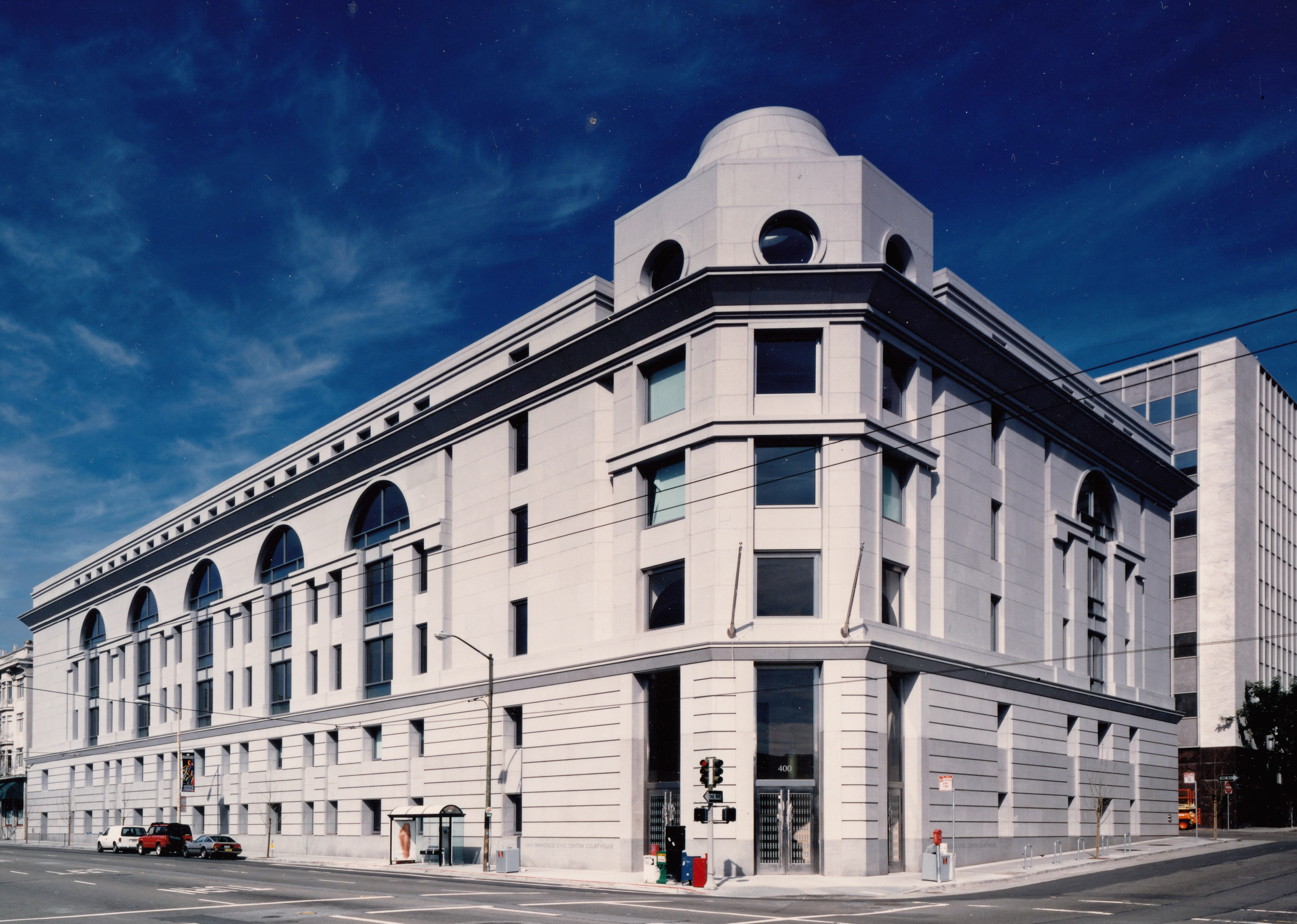
San Francisco County Superior Courthouse is located on MacAllister St. in San Francisco, near the Civic Center. It was designed to match the context of nearby government buildings.

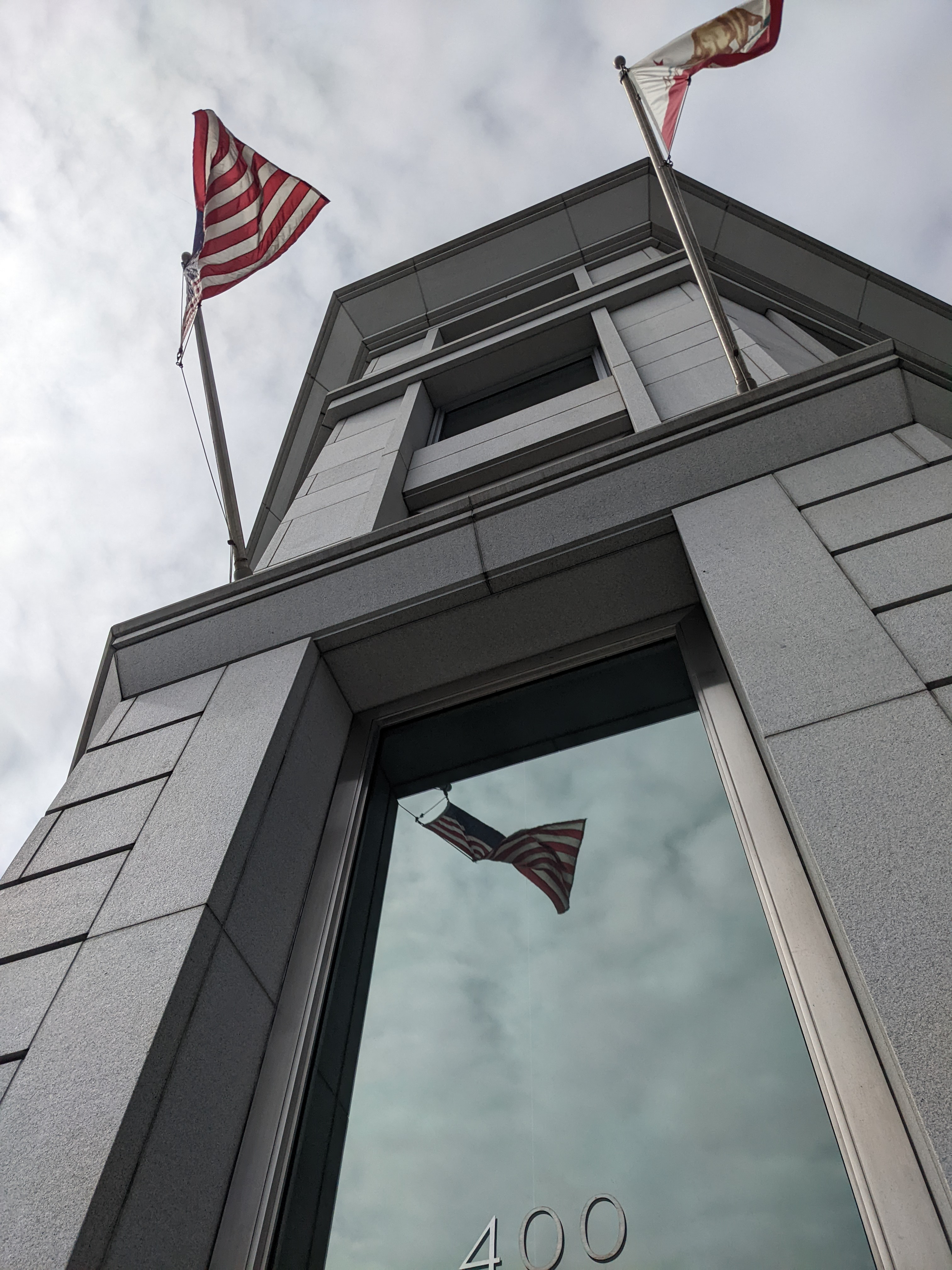
Detail of the exterior tower

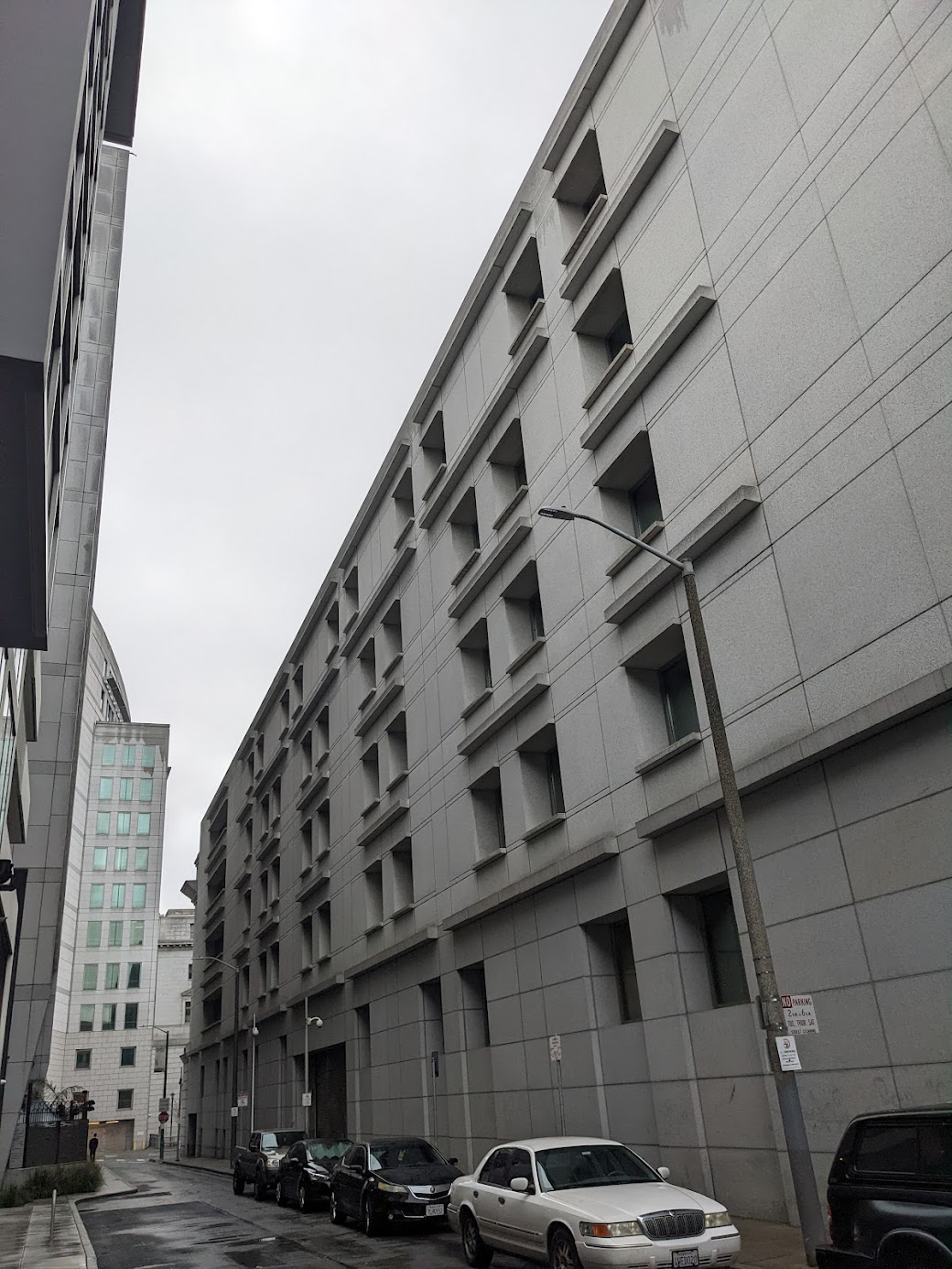
Exterior facing Redwood Street is an expression of modernism and functionality.

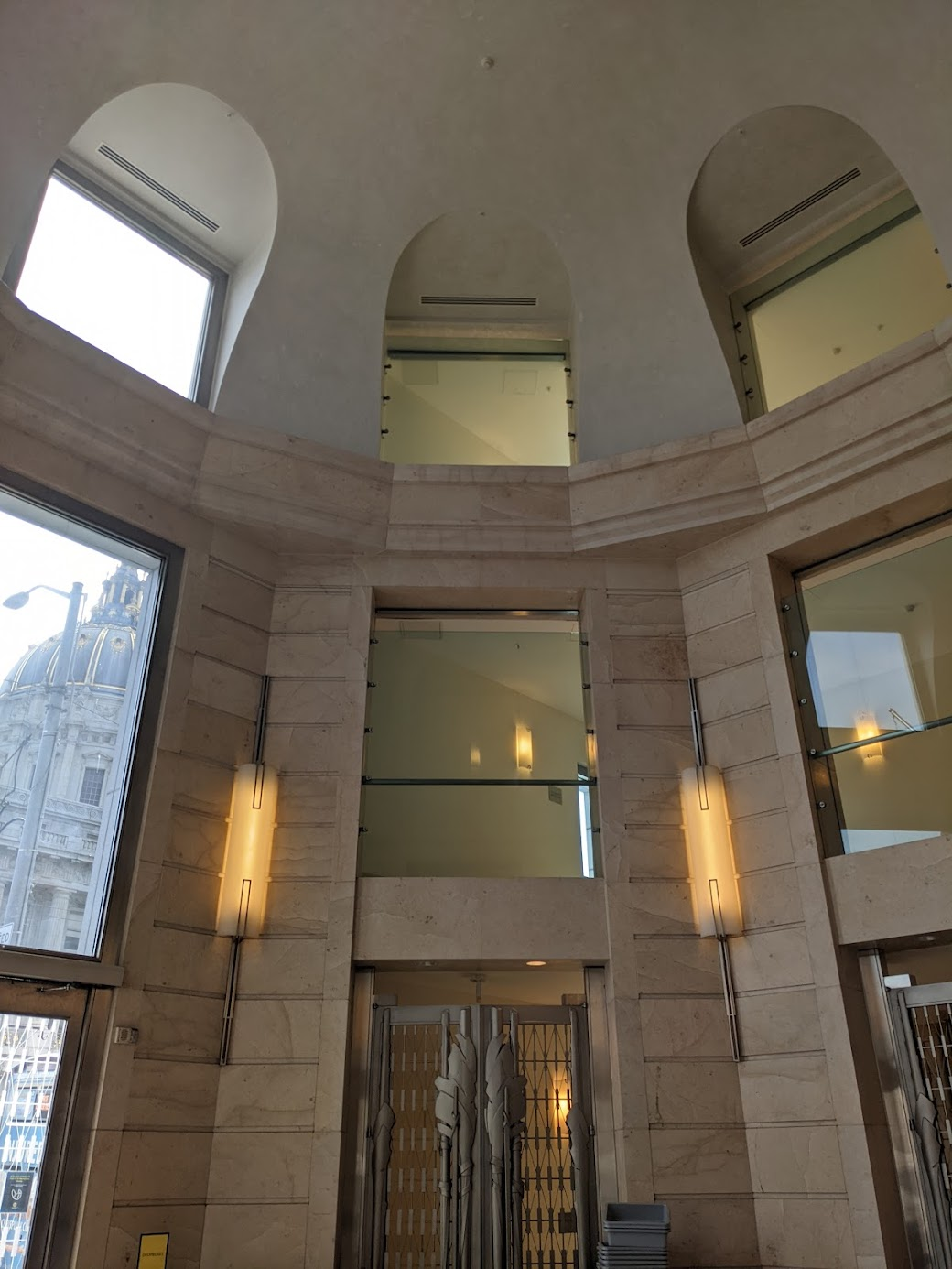
Interior Rotunda: Interior detail of the rotunda is abstracted neoclassical architecture and is also considered post-modern.

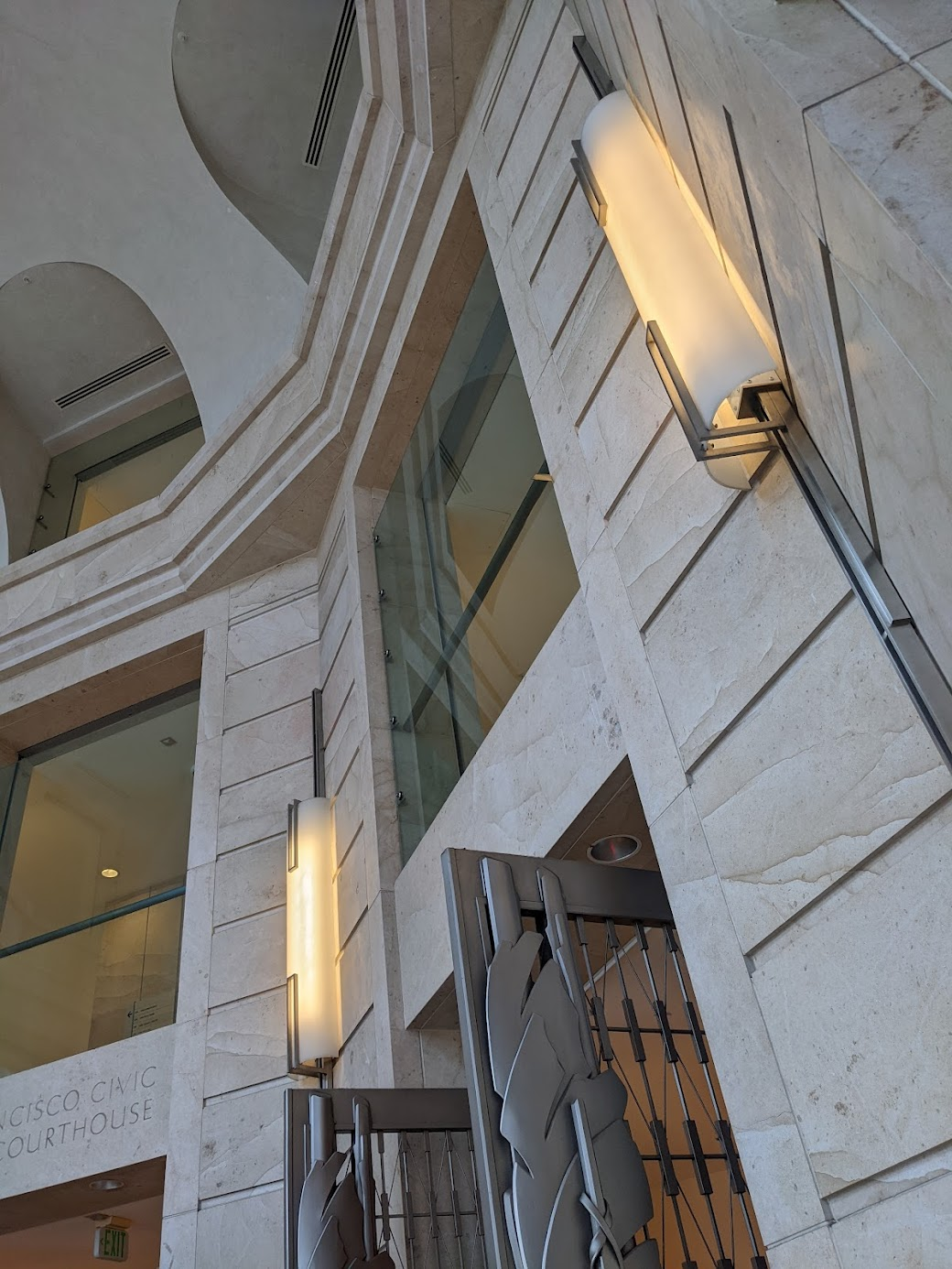
The entry rotunda features metal doors fabricated by Albert Paley of Paley Studios.
