= Equal Rights Advocates =

Equal Rights Advocates (ERA) is an American non-profit women's rights organization that was founded in 1974. ERA is a legal and advocacy organization for advancing rights and opportunities for women, girls, and people of marginalized communities through legal cases and policy advocacy.

The organization advocates for the rights of women in minimum wage jobs, women of color, immigrant women, and LGBTQ people. ERA is based out of San Francisco and is led by executive director Noreen Farrell.

== Major initiatives and involvement ==
=== Workplace justice ===
In 2018, ERA co-sponsored and played a role in passing a package of anti-sexual harassment legislation, strengthening protections for working people across California, holding neglectful employers accountable, and making it easier for victims to get justice and healing. In 2016, ERA settled a lawsuit on behalf of women employed by BAE Systems Norfolk Ship Repair, who experienced a sexually hostile work environment and was discriminated against in promotion and job assignment decisions. The women received $3 million settlement, and BAE made significant changes to its discrimination and harassment policies. In 2015, ERA sued facilities management giant ABM Industries, Inc., on behalf of night-shift janitor Maria Bojorquez, who was sexually assaulted, harassed, and faced retaliation at work. In the settlement, ABM agreed to thorough outside reviews for investigations of rape or attempted rape at their company benefitting thousands of current and future workers.

In May 2012, ERA released a report on pregnancy accommodation law: Expecting A Baby, Not A Lay-Off: Why Federal Law Should Require the Reasonable Accommodation of Pregnant Workers. ERA is a main proponent of the Pregnant Workers Fairness Act. In June 2011, Equal Rights Advocates was among the co-counsel (including the Impact Fund, Cohen Milstein, and other firms) representing Betty Dukes and women in Wal-Mart plaintiffs across the county in the historic Dukes v. Wal-Mart Stores class action. Dukes v. Wal-Mart was a class action sex discrimination lawsuit against Wal-Mart Stores challenging its policies and practices of denying equal pay and promotion opportunities to its female workforce. The Supreme Court's ruling against the lawsuit has had a lasting legacy in class action litigation.

In 1999, ERA and co-counsel settled a pregnancy discrimination lawsuit over the Pacific Bell's denial of early retirement benefits to workers who took maternity leave (Pallas v. Pacific Bell). The case covered a class of nearly 10,000 women with a settlement of more than $25 million. In 1991, alongside the Asian Law Caucus and the Mexican American Legal Defense and Educational Fund (MALDEF), ERA won a landmark federal case on behalf of Alicia Castrejon, an undocumented worker whose pregnancy discrimination lawsuit raised the issue of undocumented workers’ rights under the federal anti-discrimination law. (Equal Employment Opportunity Commission, A. Castrejon v. Tortilleria La Mejor) The ruling resulted in thousands of undocumented immigrant workers receiving legal protection against discrimination. Also in 1991, the organization and several public interest law organizations submitted an amicus brief to the U.S. Supreme Court challenging “fetal protection” policies used by employers nationwide to exclude women from high-paying industrial jobs traditionally dominated by men. (United Automobile Workers v. Johnson Controls) The Court’s landmark ruling found fetal-protection policies to be a form of sex discrimination forbidden under Title VII. Equal Rights Advocates also played a key role in the 1991 passage of the California Family Rights Act, which provides eligible employees up to 12 weeks of job-protected leave to care for their own serious health condition or that of a family member, or to bond with a new child. Passage of the federal Family and Medical Leave Act followed two years later.

In 1989, ERA challenged the federal government's policy of setting employee salaries based upon earnings in previous jobs, a practice that institutionalized and perpetuated sex- and race-based wage discrimination (Bell v. Kemp). In 1987, ERA succeeded in a 5-year challenge to the discriminatory hiring policies of the San Francisco Fire Department. The City signed a Consent Decree that included hiring and promotional goals for women and people of color, one of the initial decrees to have specific goals for women of color. (Davis et al. v. City and County of San Francisco). Also in 1987, the organization's amicus brief contributed to a U.S. Supreme Court decision upholding a California law requiring employers of five or more people to provide up to 4 months of unpaid leave to women disabled by pregnancy or childbirth. (California Federal Savings & Loan v. Department of Fair Employment and Housing).

In 1985, ERA sued the City and County of San Francisco on behalf of Louette Colombano, a 9-year veteran of the city police force, who was subjected to severe, life-threatening harassment, including extreme sexual harassment, alongside other women officers in the city’s first class to include women police recruits. (Colombano v. City and County of San Francisco) After a fraught public lead-up, ERA reached a $800,000 settlement for Colombano on the eve of the trial.

In 1981, the non-profit organization brought a class-action sex discrimination lawsuit against the U.S. Department of Agriculture Forest Service (Bernardi v. Yeutter), resulting in a consent decree with inclusive hiring goals and the creation of a $1.5 million affirmative action fund. In 1980, ERA sued Bank of American on behalf of an employee who experienced egregious sex and race discrimination at work (Miller v. Bank of America). This landmark lawsuit extended existing legal precedent to include sexual harassment, resulting in the 9th Circuit Court of Appeals ruling that employers are liable for injury inflicted by a supervisor. ERA and co-counsel negotiated a landmark Consent Decree requiring the Secretary of Labor in 1979, establishing goals and timetables for hiring women federal contractors. (Advocates for Women v. Usery).

The organization appeared before the U.S. Supreme Court to challenge a school district’s forced maternity leave policy and the denial of accrued sick pay for pregnancy-related disabilities in 1978 (Berg v. Richmond Unified School District). Following remand by the Court, a settlement was reached. In 1977, ERA successfully challenged Greyhound’s policy of excluding qualified women bus drivers through minimum height and weight requirements in 1977. (Mueller v. Greyhound Lines West) As a result, Greyhound eliminated the sexist requirements and established female hiring goals.

In 1974, the same year the non-profit organization was founded, ERA co-founder Wendy Williams argued before the U.S. Supreme Court that the state cannot deny disability insurance coverage to women disabled by pregnancy. (Geduldig v. Aiello) The Supreme Court ruled in favor of discrimination that day, but victory came 4 years later, when Congress passed the Pregnancy Discrimination Act.

=== Equity in schools and universities ===
In 2019, ERA launched an initiative to End Sexual Violence in Education, and the nation's first pro bono attorney network dedicated to providing free legal help to student survivors. In the previous year, the organization joined forces with other national advocacy groups to sue the Department of Education and Secretary Betsy DeVos over attempts to reverse Title IX protections. The lawsuit is ongoing.

In 2018, ERA with co-counsel represented two scientific researchers at a biomedical research institute in a lawsuit over their employers' inadequate response to sexual harassment and retaliation. The settlement resulted in monetary damages for clients, and the establishment of a model Title IX program specifically focused on curbing the type of sexual harassment common in research labs. These changes helped 2,800+ current graduate students and employees, plus thousands more in years to come.

The organization played a key role in developing one of the country’s most progressive K-12 public school sexual harassment policies for the Oakland Unified School District (OUSD) in Oakland, California. ERA and Alliance for Girls worked directly with students at the school to develop innovative new policies, which were then passed unanimously by the Board of Education, in 2017.

The organization represented players on the U.C. Berkeley Women’s Field Hockey team in a 2016 lawsuit after the university revoked the team's on-campus practice and competition field privileges to construct a new practice field for men’s football and lacrosse. After filing a complaint with the U.S. Department of Education Office of Civil Rights on their behalf, ERA negotiated a settlement resulting in a new on-campus field and monetary relief for the student athletes. In February 2012, ERA reached a 1.3 million dollar settlement with UC Davis in a Title IX case ERA filed in 2001 on behalf of UC Davis female wrestlers.

ERA and the NOW Legal Defense and Education Fund resolved the first case to confirm that schools can be held liable under Title IX for sexual harassment of students by other students in 1997 (Doe v. Petaluma). In 1993, ERA filed the country's first Title IX class complaint over a "hostile environment" with the Department of Education's Office for Civil Rights on behalf of students and faculty at UC Santa Cruz, who wanted to challenge the rampant sexual assault and harassment on their campus.

In 1975, on behalf of 10-year-old soccer player Amy Love, ERA filed a class-action lawsuit against the California Youth Soccer Association (Love v. California Youth Soccer Association), resulting in the Association repealing its ban on girls in soccer league competitions. One year later, Title IX went into effect, prompting greatly increased participation by girls and young women in student athletic programs.

=== Stronger California ===
ERA leads the workplace justice efforts, including on fair pay and harassment for Stronger California which is a collaborative campaign of over 50 advocacy groups and coalitions from across the state. ERA co-founded and chairs this cross-sector network, that works to help Californians combat poverty and build assets, achieve workplace justice and family-friendly workplaces, and expand access to affordable, quality child care.

=== Equal Pay Today ===
ERA co-founded with partners across the country the Equal Pay Today campaign, which works to close the wage gap that most harms women of color and low-paid working women.

=== National Free Legal Advice & Counseling Hotline ===
Established in the early 1980s, ERA's Advice & Counseling (A&C) Program consists of three components: a toll-free, multi-lingual hotline; Know Your Rights brochures; and in-person trainings. The A&C hotline is staffed by law clerks who receive training and supervision from ERA attorneys. ERA serves over a thousand callers each year, providing legal assistance and tracking trends that need immediate redress.

== See also ==
- Advocate
- Legal rights of women in history
- List of women's rights activists
- List of women's rights organizations
