= Kate Kendell =

American LGBTQ+ advocate

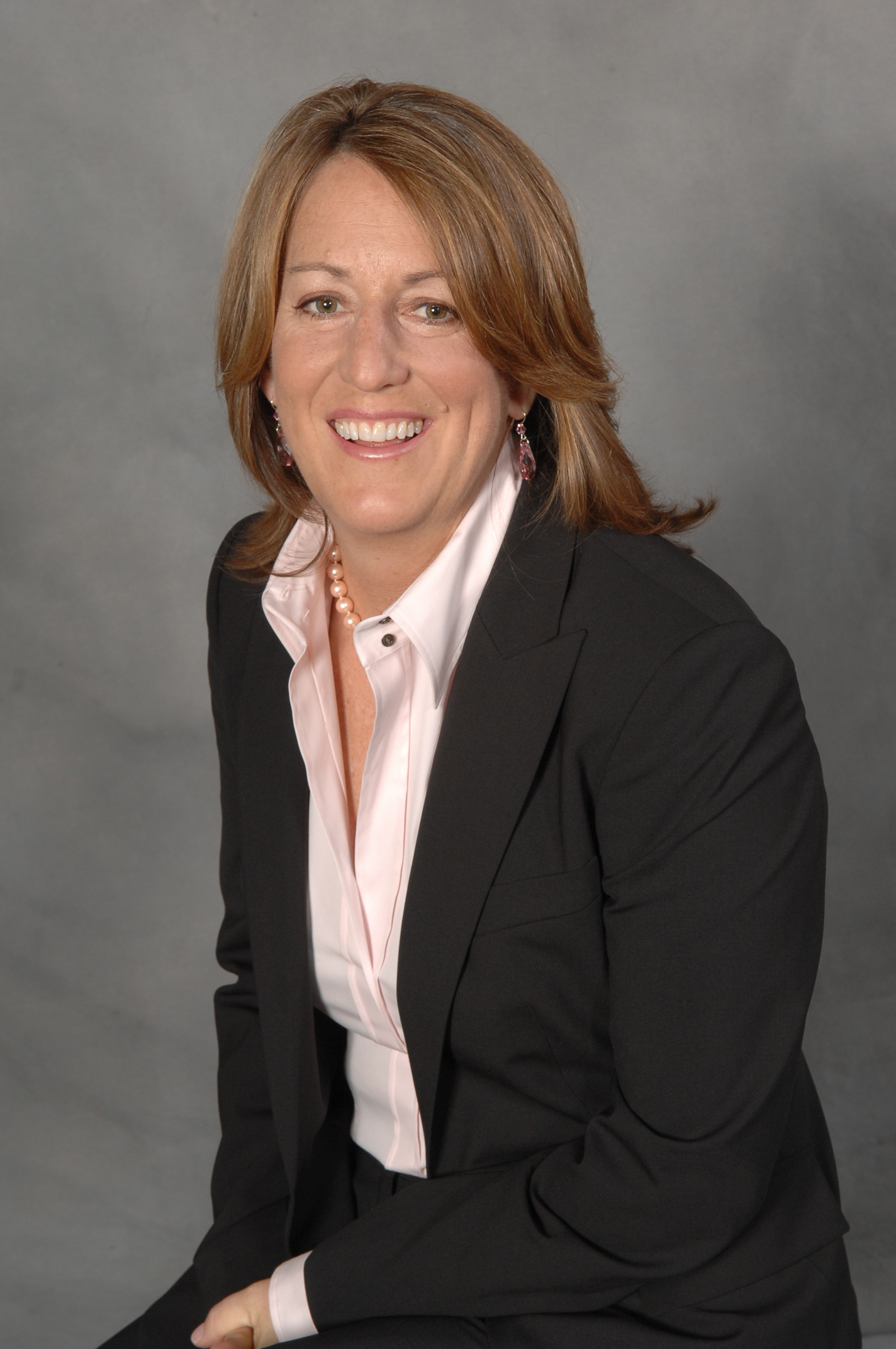
- Born: Kathryn Dean Kendell; April 15, 1960 (age 65); Portland, Oregon
- Occupation: Chief of Staff at the California Endowment
- Known for: LGBTQ advocacy, civil rights advocacy

Kate Kendell (born Kathryn Dean Kendell, April 15, 1960) is the former executive director of the National Center for Lesbian Rights (NCLR), a national legal organization that fights for the civil and human rights of lesbian, gay, bisexual, and transgender (LGBT) people and their families through litigation, public policy advocacy, and public education. Through direct litigation and advocacy, NCLR works to change discriminatory laws and to create new laws and policies protecting the LGBTQ community.

== Career ==
Kendell served with NCLR beginning in 1994, when she joined the organization as its Legal Director. Two years later, she was named executive director, serving in that role until stepping down in 2018.

Kendell grew up as a Latter-day Saint in Utah. After receiving her J.D. from the University of Utah College of Law in 1988 and a few years practicing corporate law, she pursued her real love — civil rights advocacy — and became the first staff attorney for the American Civil Liberties Union of Utah. There she directly litigated many high-profile cases focusing on all aspects of civil liberties, including reproductive rights, prisoners' rights, free speech, the rights of LGBTQ people, and the intersection of church and state.

During her leadership, the issues facing the LGBTQ community—from homophobia in sports to immigration policy—have taken center stage in the United States' discussion of LGBTQ civil rights issues. Kendell is a nationally recognized spokesperson for LGBTQ rights and has an active voice in major media, including The New York Times, The Wall Street Journal, The Advocate, NPR, CNN, and many others. Despite the national success of NCLR under her tenure, her most rewarding responsibilities still include fostering alliances on the community and organizational levels, and advocating from a grass-roots perspective on issues concerning social justice. She is also known for her inspiring and motivating keynote speeches at NCLR's annual Anniversary Celebration events and at events across the country. In July 2019 Kendell began working with the Southern Poverty Law Center as its Interim Co-Legal Director until May 2021. In June 2021 Kendell was named Chief of Staff at The California Endowment.

On April 1, 2025, Kendell was announced as the new CEO of the Gill Foundation, with a start date of May 7.

== Awards ==
On March 23, 2010, Kendell was named a "woman who could be president" by the League of Women Voters of San Francisco at their annual "Women Who Could Be President" gala. On October 13, 2009, Kendell was named a hero of National GLBT History Month. In 2004, she was named one of California's Top 100 Attorneys and also won the Del Martin/Phyllis Lyon Marriage Equality Award at Equality California's 2004 San Francisco Equality Awards. In 2002, she won the National LGBT Bar Association's Dan Bradley Award.
