= National Center for LGBTQ Rights =

American non-profit law firm

- Founded: 1977
- Founder: Donna Hitchens
- Purpose: Civil and human rights of lesbian, gay, bisexual, and transgender people and their families
- Location: United States
- Method: Litigation, public policy advocacy, and public education
- Key people: Imani Rupert-Gordon (President); Shannon Minter (Legal Director)
- Website: www.NCLRights.org

The National Center for LGBTQ Rights (formerly the National Center for Lesbian Rights) is a non-profit, public interest law firm in the United States that advocates for equitable public policies affecting the lesbian, gay, bisexual, and transgender (LGBT) community, provides free legal assistance to LGBT clients and their legal advocates, and conducts community education on LGBT legal issues. It is headquartered in San Francisco with a policy team in Washington, DC. It is the only organization in the United States dedicated to lesbian legal issues, and the largest national lesbian organization in terms of members.

Through impact litigation, public policy advocacy, public education, collaboration with other social justice organizations and activists, and direct legal services, the National Center for LGBTQ Rights (NCLR) advances the legal and human rights of LGBT people and their families across the United States.

== History ==
NCLR was founded as the Lesbian Rights Project in 1977 by Donna Hitchens and other members of Equal Rights Advocates. Roberta Achtenberg served as the second executive director. Kate Kendell served as executive director from 1996 to 2018. In December 2019, NCLR announced Imani Rupert-Gordon would be the next executive director, beginning March 2020. Cindy Myers served as ED in the interim.

On June 9, 2025, the organization changed their name from the National Center for Lesbian Rights to the National Center for LGBTQ Rights.

== Work ==
The NCLR runs a hotline to provide information to callers with legal questions related to their sexual orientation or gender identity.

In November 2014, as part of the NLCR's #BornPerfect campaign, Samantha Ames and Samuel Brinton testified before the UN Committee Against Torture, the first ever to do so regarding the practice of conversion therapy as being a potential violation of human rights law.

== Notable cases ==
Notable cases in which the firm has been a primary counsel include In re Marriage Cases, Strauss v. Horton, and Christian Legal Society v. Martinez.

== See also ==
- Coalition of Activist Lesbians Australia – national lesbian rights organization in Australia.
- Roberta Achtenberg - second executive director.
