= Holby City series 22 =

Holby City
- Series 22
- No. of episodes: 44

Release
- Original network: BBC One; BBC One HD
- Original release: 7 January 2020 – 30 March 2021

Series chronology
- ← Previous; Series 21 Next → Series 23

The twenty-second series of the British medical drama television series Holby City began on BBC One on 7 January 2020 in the United Kingdom. The series consists of 44 episodes. Jane Wallbank is the series producer, and Simon Harper is the executive producer. The series features an episode dedicated to Holocaust Memorial Day, a topical last-minute insert about the COVID-19 pandemic and a COVID-19-themed episode. Production for the drama was suspended between March and July 2020 due to the pandemic, which led to two transmission hiatuses during the series. Fifteen regular cast members reprised their roles from the previous series, four of which depart during the series, including long-serving cast members Hugh Quarshie (Ric Griffin) and Rosie Marcel (Jac Naylor). Guy Self (John Michie) returns for a short stint and Raf di Lucca (Joe McFadden) appears in a single episode, having been previously killed-off. The series also features the introduction of the show's first regular transgender character, Louis McGerry (Tyler Luke Cunningham), and a guest appearance for actor and television personality John Barrowman as Drew Nicholson-Heath.

== Episodes ==
No. overall	No. in series	Title	Directed by	Written by	Original release date	Viewers (millions)
1009	1	"Episode 1"	Jan Bauer	Patrick Homes	7 January 2020	N/A (<5.25) (Note: Not reported in the weekly top 15 programmes for four-screen viewer ratings.)
Jac is discharged from the psychiatric hospital after being honest about her relationship with Emma. She learns Kian has gone up a mountain and goes after him, worried he is suicidal. In fact, he just wanted time to himself and is helping an asthmatic climber. Kian falls while he and Jac are getting the climber to safety, so Jac continues to help the climber, then calls an air ambulance and goes back to Kian. He recovers in hospital and, despite needing to get rid of consultants, Max agrees to reinstate them both. Max meets Jeremy, a private detective with a brain tumour that was deemed inoperable. She admits to Ric that she hired him to find Lily six years ago. Jeremy says he found her four months ago and will tell Max where she is if she operates. Max successfully removes the tumour and Jeremy claims he lied but actually calls Lily asking for hush money not to tell Max anything.
1010	2	"Episode 2"	David Innes Edwards	Katie Douglas	15 January 2020	N/A (<4.95)
Jac and Kian return to work and learn the pitch for the new cardiothoracic unit is today. YAU has been closed down, porters like Jason now work for a private firm and Ric is trying to convince Serena to take an admin position. Max asks Ange to do a shift leading AAU and she looks after a patient who is having panic attacks after accidentally hitting a friend with a javelin. The friend is on Darwin where Kian has to operate because Jac is banned from theatre. Marty, Kian's cousin, visits and tells Jac he has a morphine addiction. Jac sends him back to Canada and does the pitch herself. Ange is offered a permanent post on AAU and accepts on condition Serena isn't forced out. Sacha is finding it hard being around Ben and Essie so arranges for a plumber to fix Essie's flat. Max admits to Ric that she is an alcoholic which is why Lily ran away. The police have tracked down Lily but she refuses to see Max.
1011	3	"Episode 3"	David Innes Edwards	Katie Douglas	21 January 2020	N/A (<4.80)
Jac and Nicky encounter Nicky's mother Tracey, who has hit another car while driving without insurance. The other driver, Steve, demands compensation money. Nicky throws him out but he is later found collapsed with a torn diaphragm and demands £3000 to stay quiet. Nicky asks Xavier about locum work. Donna and Xavier buy a house together. Essie is worried about having to explain Isla to Ben and breaks up with him. There is a GQC inspection of AAU and Jason is sacked after losing his temper with a patient over the new shift pattern, resulting in the porters going on strike. Serena is arrested after supporting them and later has to operate on Alex, who has come in with an injured leg and developed compartment syndrome, after they and Donna are trapped in an office. Max negotiates with the porters, reinstating Jason and reviewing the hours, and the inspection is passed. Serena resigns, leaving a video message telling the staff to fight against any attempts to sell off the NHS.
1012	4	"Episode 4"	Dermot Boyd	Davey Jones	28 January 2020	N/A (<4.99)
Sacha's aunt Maria gives a radio interview for Holocaust Memorial Day before being brought into the hospital with an ischaemic bowel. Ben convinces Sacha she wouldn't survive an operation. Maria urges Sacha to tell Essie he still loves her but he discovers she's back with Ben. Maria dies. Fletch leaks a story to the press about plans to open up a private cardiac unit in the hospital. Nicky calls in sick in order to take a locum shift. A youth, Owen, brings his injured girlfriend onto AAU. It turns out they have both been stabbed but this isn't discovered until Owen is trapped in a lift with Cameron and Jason. Max gives Cameron instructions to do an emergency thoracotomy but he freezes so Jason does it instead. Everyone assumes Cameron was responsible and he tells Jason he could get in trouble if people find out the truth, before giving him an engraved pen as a present. Cameron and Chloe go out together and kiss but she asks him for time.
1013	5	"Episode 5"	Dermot Boyd	Nick Fisher	5 February 2020	N/A (<5.02)
Sacha is due to perform a ground breaking transplant where the small bowel is kept fresh in a neothermic tank. Max tries to remove him from the operation when it is revealed an abusive patient he refused to treat turned up at another hospital in a worse condition, but Ric, Ben and Essie refuse to operate without him and the procedure is a success. Xavier and Donna meet a casting director who was hit by a bike. Donna tries to put herself forward but she is more interested in Mia. Nicky and Chloe find Tracey has injured herself while trying to sell her car and Nicky agrees to take on her debt. Max learns of Nicky working at St James' when she was supposed to be sick and insists she repay the money. Cameron lends Nicky his mother's necklace for the registrars' ball while he stays home with Chloe. Nicky claims to have lost it but is actually planning to sell it.
1014	6	"Episode 6"	Daikin Marsh	Claire Miller	11 February 2020	N/A (<4.85)
Ben arranges a blind date for Sacha for Valentine's Day but a talk with Rabbi Stein, who is in for varicose vein treatment, convinces Sacha to spend the evening with friends instead. Xavier buys Donna an engraved bench. Nicky gives the money she owes to Steve but he demands another £1500. A patient, Harry, is trying to get to India to see his dying father but needs a heart bypass and will need to wait at least three months. He offers Nicky money to get it done quickly and she gets him to fake a heart attack so she and Chloe can operate in an emergency. Another patient, Julia, also has a heart attack and Jac, Fletch, Chloe and Nicky have to divide themselves between two operations as both suffer complications. Nicky turns down the money and confesses to Cameron. Cameron realises Steve is a drug addict and threatens him into backing off. He retrieves the necklace from the pawn shop and gives it to Chloe when they have an evening in but reacts insensitively when she still won't sleep with him.
1015	7	"Episode 7"	Daikin Marsh	Johanne McAndrew & Elliot Hope	18 February 2020	N/A (<4.62)
1016	8	"Episode 8"	Waris Islam	Alex Straker	25 February 2020	N/A (<4.62)
1017	9	"Episode 9"	Waris Islam	Damian Mullen	26 February 2020	N/A (<4.62)
1018	10	"Episode 10"	Jamie Annett	Isla Gray	10 March 2020	N/A (<4.61)
1019	11	"Episode 11"	Jamie Annett	Ed Sellek	24 March 2020	N/A (<5.68)
1020	12	"Episode 12"	Steve Brett	Ed Sellek	31 March 2020	N/A (<6.43)
1021	13	"Episode 13"	Steve Brett	Simon Norman	7 April 2020	N/A (<5.47)
1022	14	"Episode 14"	Griff Rowland	Joe Ainsworth	14 April 2020	N/A (<5.44)
1023	15	"Episode 15"	Griff Rowland	Becky Prestwich	2 June 2020	N/A (<4.37)
1024	16	"Episode 16"	Jennie Darnell	Phil Mulryne	9 June 2020	N/A (<4.14)
1025	17	"Episode 17"	Jennie Darnell	Johnny Candon	16 June 2020	N/A (<4.58)
1026	18	"Episode 18"	David Innes Edwards	Katie Douglas	23 June 2020	N/A (<3.94)
1027	19	"Episode 19"	David Innes Edwards	Katie Douglas	30 June 2020	N/A (<4.04)
1028	20	"Episode 20"	Dean Byfield	Julie Parsons	7 July 2020	N/A (<4.16)
1029	21	"Episode 21"	Dean Byfield	Ed Sellek	14 July 2020	N/A (<3.92)
1030	22	"Episode 22"	Karl Neilson	Davey Jones	21 July 2020	N/A (<3.68)
1031	23	"Episode 23"	Karl Neilson	Nick Fisher	28 July 2020	N/A (<4.04)
1032	24	"Episode 24"	Tracey Rooney	Lucia Haynes	4 August 2020	N/A (<3.77)
1033	25	"Episode 25"	Tracey Rooney	Joe Ainsworth	11 August 2020	N/A (<3.71)
1034	26	"Episode 26"	Steve Brett	Patrick Homes	10 November 2020	N/A (<5.12)
1035	27	"Episode 27"	Griff Rowland	Joe Ainsworth	17 November 2020	N/A (<4.72)
1036	28	"Episode 28"	Griff Rowland	Ciara Conway	24 November 2020	N/A (<5.00)
1037	29	"Episode 29"	Paulette Randall	Andy Bayliss	1 December 2020	N/A (<4.84)
1038	30	"Episode 30"	Paulette Randall	Ed Sellek	8 December 2020	N/A (<5.06)
1039	31	"Episode 31"	Steve Brett	Damian Mullen	15 December 2020	N/A (<5.18)
1040	32	"Episode 32"	Steve Brett	Katie Douglas	5 January 2021	N/A (<5.28)
1041	33	"Episode 33"	Jamie Annett	Rebekah Harrison	12 January 2021	N/A (<4.65)
1042	34	"Episode 34"	Jamie Annett	Patrick Homes	19 January 2021	N/A
1043	35	"Episode 35"	Karl Neilson	Joe Ainsworth	26 January 2021	N/A
1044	36	"Episode 36"	Karl Neilson	Joe Ainsworth	2 February 2021	N/A
1045	37	"Episode 37"	Dean Byfield	Ciara Conway	10 February 2021	N/A
1046	38	"Episode 38"	Dean Byfield	Ciara Conway	16 February 2021	N/A
1047	39	"Episode 39"	David Innes Edwards	Michelle Lipton	23 February 2021	N/A
1048	40	"Episode 40"	David Innes Edwards	Becky Prestwich	2 March 2021	N/A
1049	41	"Episode 41"	Daikin Marsh	Katie Douglas	9 March 2021	N/A
1050	42	"Episode 42"	Daikin Marsh	Andy Bayliss	16 March 2021	N/A
1051	43	"Episode 43"	Steve Brett	Ed Sellek	23 March 2021	N/A
1052	44	"Episode 44"	Steve Brett	Lydia Marchant	30 March 2021	N/A

== Production ==
The series commenced on 7 January 2020 on BBC One and normally airs on Tuesday nights, although episodes 9 and 37 were originally broadcast on a Wednesday evening. Episode 11 was postponed by a week due to an extended news bulletin on the COVID-19 outbreak. Simon Harper continues his role as the executive producer of the show, until episode 32. Jane Wallbank serves as the series producer for the series. Kate Oates, the head of continuing drama at BBC Studios, and Deborah Sathe, the senior head of content production at BBC Studios, both oversee the production of the series. The series consists of 44 episodes. A winter trailer for the show's upcoming storylines was released on 4 December 2019. This series includes an episode dedicated to Holocaust Memorial Day featuring the characters of Sacha and Essie. Producers were asked by the BBC to create an episode for the occasion and they scripted it in August. The episode was broadcast as the fourth episode in the series. Holby City producers created two topical inserts for episodes 10 and 11 in March 2020, referencing the COVID-19 outbreak. A show spokesperson confirmed that the scenes were specially filmed a week prior to broadcast rather than the typical filming schedule months in advance.

The drama's upcoming storylines were previewed in a trailer released on 6 March 2020. Stories include cancer diagnoses for Essie and Fletch. Harper praised the "heartbreaking" and "wonderful" performances of Wragg and Walkinshaw, and explained that the story would follow the pair "[having] this huge, bonding thing in common but such a different experience of it." Wragg also commented on the plot, "Throughout their journeys, Essie and Fletch discover their worst fears, their lost opportunities and what futures they need to make plans for."

It was announced on 18 March 2020 that production had been suspended on Holby City and other BBC Studios continuing dramas in light of new government guidelines following the COVID-19 pandemic. A BBC Studios statement confirmed that there would be no impact on the immediate broadcast of episodes, but the "long-term ramifications are still unclear". Despite this, it was announced on 9 April 2020 that the drama would be going on an extended hiatus on 14 April, following the broadcast of episode 14. Following its broadcast, it was confirmed that the show would return in July 2020. However, on 19 May 2020, it was announced that Holby City would return to broadcast on 2 June 2020. To aid hospitals during the outbreak, Holby City donated their on-set ventilators, which are fully operational, to the NHS Nightingale Hospital. On the donation, Harper commented, "We are only too happy to help out and do what we can for the courageous and selfless real life medics." They also donated personal protective equipment and other hospital equipment to the NHS. Oates confirmed that they would not ask for them back when they resumed filming.

A second extended hiatus for Holby City was announced in August 2020 due to the show running out of episodes filmed before the suspension of production. The show breaks on 11 August, following the broadcast of episode 25. Production resumed on Holby City on 27 July 2020. Oates expressed her delight at welcoming back the "exceptional cast and crew". She added, "We have some gripping stories to tell as we explore how the lives of our characters have been irrevocably changed since the start of the pandemic - and how our heroes battle against the odds, come what may." Strict protocols were enforced to maintain the safety of the cast and crew. Additionally, the physical distancing measures enforced by the British government were adhered to. Since the drama is set in a hospital, characters used PPE as part of their costume. To avoid using NHS resources, Holby City sourced their PPE from an alternative supplier and despite this, it maintains effectiveness, allowing them to occasionally breach the physical distancing measures. Due to the protocols enforced, cast were required to apply their own makeup with verbal support from the makeup artists. The show regularly uses makeup-created injuries, such as cuts and bruises, but this was stopped due to the new protection measures. Despite this, larger makeup injuries, such as surgery closeups, were still able to be replicated using prosthetics. Jo Martin, who portrays Max McGerry, explained that more mannequin dummies were being used on-set to reduce the number of additional people required.

Producers made the pandemic a recurring theme throughout the rest of the series, and to accommodate this, all pre-existing scripts were scrapped and the pre-planned stories were rewritten. Oates explained that the decision was taken as the previous material "[would not] have felt relevant". Oates entered discussions with Tim Davie, the Director-General of the BBC, about how political Holby City could be about the pandemic, as it is one of his concerns; he permitted in-character political statements. Oates was pleased with this as she did not believe the show could be "truthful" without that and also feared it could make the show "boring". She wanted the show to reflect new landscape of the NHS and hoped that it would spark new topical conversations. She commented, "Hopefully, on shows like ours, we can make those social points at the same time as our heroes are seen in their best Avengers style embracing the same kind of life-or-death situations they always have."

In October 2020, it was confirmed that the show would resume broadcast on 10 November. Episodes were temporarily reduced to 40 minutes in length. A 20-second trailer advertising the show's return was released on 29 October 2020. Oates expressed her delight at the show's return and wanted to reflect the importance of the NHS in the drama. She also teased "stories of love, loss and betrayal" upon the drama's return. The first episode after the break explores the pandemic and focuses on how the hospital staff, led by Max, cope. David Brown, writing for The Guardian, described the episode as "a stark, uncompromising episode of Holby City, set at the peak of the first Covid spike". He believed that the show was able to reflect "the unsettling world in which we are now living", providing "an emergency service". A scene in the episode features Max informing the staff that they will have to use out-of-date PPE. Martin struggled to film the scene, but wanted to reflect the real-life situation. She commented, "What we're showing is the sheer exhaustion of the staff and their feelings of being left out there on their own. It was a complete debacle." Martin noted that the episode would express political views, but explained that it should be expected in such a "hard-hitting" episode.

== Cast ==
The series began with 15 roles receiving star billing. Jo Martin portrays Max McGerry, a consultant in neurosurgery and the acting chief executive officer of Holby City Hospital, the show's setting. Hugh Quarshie stars as Ric Griffin, the hospital's medical director and a consultant general surgeon on the Acute Assessment Unit (AAU). Alex Walkinshaw stars as Adrian "Fletch" Fletcher, the director of nursing services. Catherine Russell plays Serena Campbell, the clinical lead of the AAU and a consultant general surgeon. Marcus Griffiths acts as Xavier "Zav" Duval, a general surgical registrar on the unit, and Nic Jackman features as Cameron Dunn, a general surgical CT1 doctor. Jaye Jacobs appears as Donna Jackson, the unit's senior staff nurse. Bob Barrett continues his role as Sacha Levy, a consultant general surgeon and the clinical lead of the general surgery ward, Keller. David Ames portrays Dominic Copeland, Keller ward's general surgical registrar. Kaye Wragg plays staff nurse Essie Di Lucca on the ward. Dawn Steele features as Ange Godard, a consultant general surgeon and the clinical lead of the Young Adult Unit (YAU), who later becomes the clinical lead of the AAU. Ramin Karimloo appears as Kian Madani, a consultant cardiothoracic surgeon and the clinical lead of the cardiothoracic surgery ward, Darwin. Rosie Marcel features in the series as Jac Naylor, a consultant cardiothoracic surgeon, and later, the co-clinical lead of the ward. Amy Lennox stars as Chloe Godard, a cardiothoracic registrar. Belinda Owusu portrays Nicky McKendrick, a cardiothoracic CT1 doctor. Additionally, the semi-regular cast contains Jules Robertson, Darcey Burke, Julia Deakin and Charlie Condou who star as porter Jason Haynes, Jac's daughter Emma Naylor-Maconie, Dominic's adoptive mother Carole Copeland, and locum consultant general surgeon Ben Sherwood, respectively.

Russell's departure from the drama after seven years was confirmed on 30 October 2019, and Serena's exit airs at the beginning of the series. Harper expressed his sadness at the departure, but wished the actress the best for the future and thanked her for her "unique, drily witty and passionate" performance as Serena. The character departs in episode 3. Condou's guest stint as Ben ends in episode 11 at the conclusion of his coming out story. Condou explained that Ben leaves after deciding to "spend a bit of time trying to figure out who he is." Writers opted to kill-off Zav in episode 14 as part of a story creating Cameron as a villainous character. Griffiths was pleased with his "memorable" exit story and thought it formed a "wicked, really awesome arc" to his character. Wragg's departure was confirmed in July 2020, and the character is killed-off in episode 25. In the narrative, Essie dies on her way to her wedding to Sacha. On 29 October 2020, it was announced that Quarshie, the longest-serving cast member, had opted to leave the show. He praised Holby City for changing his career and commented, "I wouldn't have stayed so long if it hadn't been a great place to work, and leaving will be like leaving home - a place where there is warmth and a welcome". Ric departs in episode 26. In January 2021, the departure of Marcel was announced, ending a fifteen-year stint on the show. The actress opted to leave to spend more time with her family. Jac departs in episode 36 after being involved in a shooting and deciding to start afresh. Marcel noted similarities between her reasons for leaving and the character's.

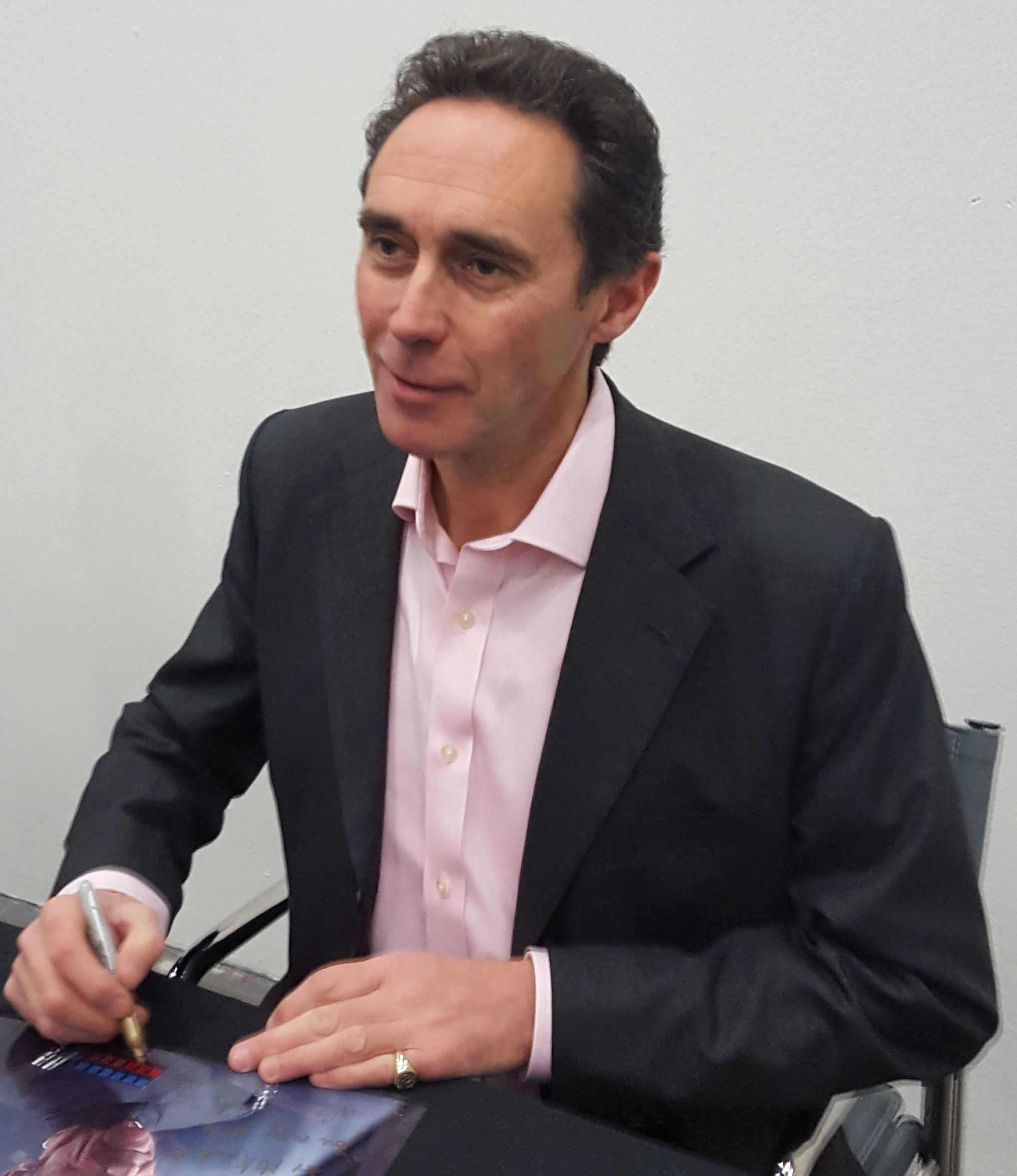
Guy Henry (Henrik Hanssen) returns from a break.

Guy Henry returns to his role as Henrik Hanssen, a consultant general surgeon, during this series, having taken a break in the previous series. Henry confirmed that he had returned for a longer stint and Hanssen returns in the seventh episode as part of a story involving Carole. The return of actor John Michie in the role of consultant neurosurgeon Guy Self was announced on 6 March 2020. Guy returns following the privatisation of Darwin ward by external company Kestrel, which Guy has shares in. Harper expressed his delight at the character's return, promising that he would "sow trouble and strife" and create tension with Ric. The character returns in episode 13. On 9 July 2020, it was announced that Joe McFadden had reprised his role as Raf di Lucca for a single episode. The character was killed-off in a nineteenth series episode and appears as a vision to Essie during her terminal cancer story. McFadden explained that Raf returns to guide Essie in a "touching" episode. A show spokesperson told the Daily Mirror that the appearance would be "emotional" and "incredibly moving". Episode 26 features the semi-regular return of Alex Duval, the brother of Xavier, who joins the hospital as a healthcare assistant. The character previously appeared in two episodes of series 20, portrayed by Leemore Marrett Jr; upon his return, the role was recast to actor Miles Mitchell. Oates revealed on 29 October 2020 that a former character would be returning to the drama; their identity was kept under a press embargo. Actress Laila Rouass confirmed that she had reprised her role as cardiothoracic consultant Sahira Shah in January 2021. Returning in episode 37, Sahira replaces Jac on Darwin ward as the clinical lead.

Tyler Luke Cunningham joined the cast as Louis McGerry, the son of Max, in episode 12. Louis, like Cunningham, is transgender and his introduction coincided with Trans Day of Visibility. Initially appearing in a recurring role, Cunningham joined the show's regular cast in episode 15 as Louis begins employment at the hospital as a staff nurse. Following the show's production break, four new regular characters were introduced to the series: psychiatric nurse Lucky Simpson (Vineeta Rishi), and F1 doctors: Josh Hudson (Trieve Blackwood-Cambridge), Jeong-Soo Han (Chan Woo Lim), and Skylar Bryce (Phoebe Pryce). Josh, Jeong-Soo and Skylar were introduced in episode 26, while Lucky appears from episode 28. Skylar departs the show in episode 34 after trying to kill herself. Actress Amy Murphy was introduced in episode 37 as "warm, vibrant and charming" nurse Kylie Madden. Murphy's agency confirmed that she had joined the show's regular cast.

The series features several recurring characters, and numerous guest stars. Wallbank confirmed in an August 2019 interview that two cast members from Holby City's sister show Casualty: Jason Durr (David Hide) and Shaheen Jafargholi (Marty Kirkby) would appear during this series for guest appearances. Marty appears in a story with his cousin, Kian, and David appears in a story about nursing. Jafargholi's appearance features in episode two. Durr filmed his appearances in December 2019, and he appears in episodes 12 and 13. Nicky features prominently in the series as part of a "big, gritty, topical" story exploring her personal struggles. As part of the story, actress Cathy Murphy was cast to portray Nicky's mother, Tracey McKendrick, in a recurring capacity from episode 3. She continues to appear in the series until episode 21 when Nicky disowns her. Tracey's blackmailer, Steve Connor (John Wark), was also introduced for the beginning of the story, appearing in two episodes. Towards the end of Murphy's guest stint, Lynn Hunter was cast to portray Tracey's friend, Brenda Connolly. She appears in three episodes culminating in her character's death.

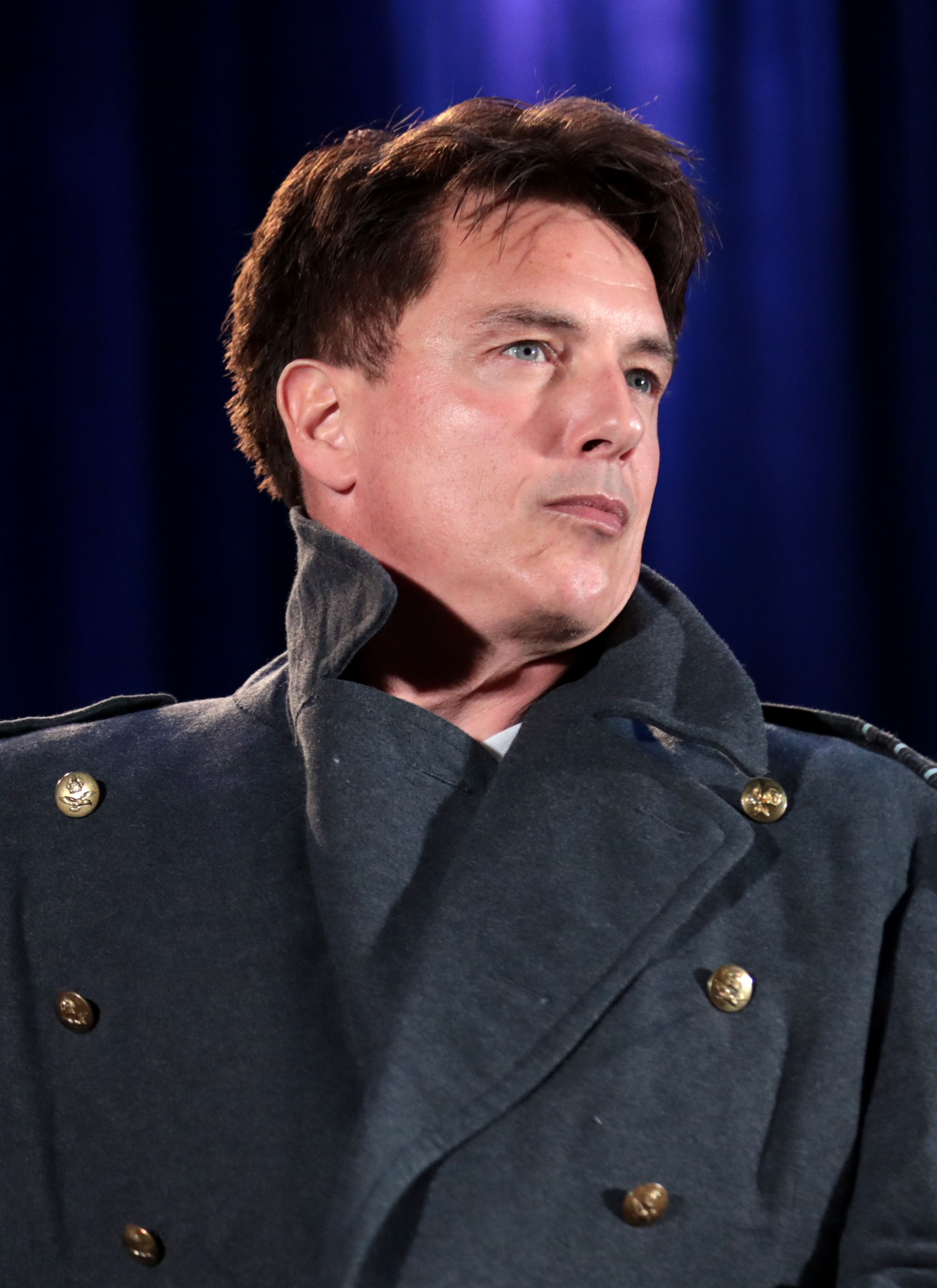
John Barrowman guest stars as locum Drew Nicholson-Heath.

Susan Engel reprised her guest role as Sacha's great aunt, Maria Edelman, in episode 4, having last appeared in series 19. She appears in the Holocaust Memorial Day episode. Following this, David Horovitch reprised his role as Rabbi Stein, the rabbi at Sacha's synagogue, having also previously appeared in a series 19 episode. Horovitch appeared again in the twenty-fifth episode for Sacha and Essie's wedding. As part of a story about Kian, Phoenix Bates (Joshua Glenister), the son of Kian's dead girlfriend, Bea Kaminski (Rosalind Halstead), was introduced. He appears in episodes 17 and 22. Episode 18 features the appearance of Fletch's daughter, Evie Fletcher, who is now portrayed by Phoebe French. Macey Chipping previously played the character across four series. Having previously appeared in the last series, Sophie Harkness reprised her role as Frankie Rendell in episode 23 as part of Essie's terminal cancer story. John Barrowman was cast in a one-episode guest role as Drew Nicholson-Heath, a consultant and "renowned global recruiter" who shares a backstory with Ange. Barrowman expressed his delight at appearing in the drama and commented, "My character Drew brings a new flavour to the show and I look forward to his return soon. Surgery will never be the same again." Drew appears in episode 23 and Barrowman suggested that the character could appear in future episodes.

The casting of actress Sian Reese-Williams in the recurring guest role of Jodie Rodgers was announced in October 2020. Jodie is a love interest for Sacha and features in a story about Sacha's grief for Essie. Reese-Williams expressed her excitement about the role and said that she was surprised to be offered a job during the pandemic. It was also confirmed that the chairman of the board, Michael Townsend (Elliot Levey), would appear, and he debuted in episode 27. Amanda Mealing, who portrays Connie Beauchamp in Casualty and formerly in Holby City, told Elaine Reilly of What's on TV that she would make a crossover appearance in the series to "visit the old gang again".

=== Main characters ===
- David Ames as Dominic Copeland
- Bob Barrett as Sacha Levy
- Trieve Blackwood-Cambridge as Josh Hudson (from episode 26)
- Tyler Luke Cunningham as Louis McGerry (from episode 12)
- Marcus Griffiths as Xavier "Zav" Duval (until episode 14)
- Guy Henry as Henrik Hanssen
- Nic Jackman as Cameron Dunn (until episode 43)
- Jaye Jacobs as Donna Jackson
- Ramin Karimloo as Kian Madani
- Amy Lennox as Chloe Godard
- Rosie Marcel as Jac Naylor (until episode 36)
- Jo Martin as Max McGerry
- Amy Murphy as Kylie Madden (from episode 37)
- Belinda Owusu as Nicky McKendrick (until episode 44)
- Phoebe Pryce as Skylar Bryce (episodes 26 - 34)
- Hugh Quarshie as Ric Griffin (until episode 26)
- Vineeta Rishi as Lucky Simpson (from episode 28)
- Catherine Russell as Serena Campbell (until episode 3)
- Dawn Steele as Ange Godard
- Alex Walkinshaw as Adrian "Fletch" Fletcher
- Chan Woo Lim as Jeong-Soo Han (from episode 26)
- Kaye Wragg as Essie Di Lucca (until episode 25)

=== Recurring characters ===
- Darcey Burke as Emma Naylor-Maconie (episodes 1–23)
- Charlie Condou as Ben Sherwood (episodes 2–11)
- Julia Deakin as Carole Copeland
- Phoebe French as Evie Fletcher
- Elliot Levey as Michael Townsend
- John Michie as Guy Self
- Miles Mitchell as Alex Duval
- Cathy Murphy as Tracey McKendrick (episodes 3–21)
- Sian Reese-Williams as Jodie Rodgers
- Jules Robertson as Jason Haynes (episodes 2–15)
- Laila Rouass as Sahira Shah

=== Guest characters ===
- John Barrowman as Drew Nicholson-Heath
- Jason Durr as David Hide
- Susan Engel as Maria Edelman (episode 4)
- Joshua Glenister as Phoenix Bates
- Sophie Harkness as Frankie Rendell
- David Horovitch as Rabbi Stein (episodes 6 and 25)
- Lynn Hunter as Brenda Connolly
- Shaheen Jafargholi as Marty Kirkby (episode 2)
- Joe McFadden as Raf di Lucca
- Heather Peace as Alex Dawson (episode 3)
- John Wark as Steve Connor (episodes 3 and 6)

== See also ==
- Impact of the COVID-19 pandemic on television
