= Essie Harrison =

Fictional character from Holby City

- Holby City character
- Kaye Wragg as Essie Harrison
- First appearance: "My Name Is Joe"; 6 May 2014
- Last appearance: "Episode 1100"; 15 March 2022
- Portrayed by: Kaye Wragg
- Spinoff(s): Casualty (2019)

In-universe information
- Alias: Essie Di Lucca
- Occupation: Staff nurse; (prev. transplant coordinator, agency nurse)
- Spouse: Raf di Lucca (2017)
- Significant other: Sacha Levy
- Relatives: Joe Goodridge (grandfather)

Estelle "Essie" Harrison (also Di Lucca) is a fictional character from the BBC medical drama Holby City, played by actress Kaye Wragg. She first appeared in the series sixteen episode "My Name Is Joe", broadcast on 6 May 2014. Essie arrives at Holby City employed as an agency nurse working on the hospital's AAU and Keller wards. She is characterised as an opinionated nurse who is not afraid to challenge the healthcare system. She is also played as a warm person who makes a good friend for fellow characters and strives to provide excellent patient care. Her introduction to the show was controversial and featured the discovery that her grandfather Joe Goodridge (Julian Glover) was an escaped Nazi war criminal.

Essie's main stories have been centric to her relationship with registrar Sacha Levy (Bob Barrett). The show's producer Simon Harper was fond of the pairing but tasked his writing team to create a series of dilemmas for them. Their romance is overshadowed because Sacha and his family are Jewish and they struggle to accept her due to Joe's actions. Her need to have a child of her own also causes problems. Essie has been involved in other relationship stories featuring registrar Raf di Lucca (Joe McFadden), which resulted in marriage, and locum consultant Ben Sherwood (Charlie Condou). Despite this, Sacha always plays a key role in the stories and the pair eventually reunite.

Other stories include being held hostage by a patient, unauthorised parenting and a promotion to the hospital's transplant coordinator. One of the character's prominent stories during her later tenure focused on her ovarian cancer diagnosis which resulted in a hysterectomy for her survival. Producers decided to revisit the story in 2020, when Essie learns her cancer has returned. The story was run alongside another cancer storyline featured in Holby City, a decision taken to raise awareness of the statistically high occurrence of cancer in society. Essie is killed off in the show’s 1033rd episode, broadcast on 11 August 2020. Wragg reprised the role for the show's finale in 2022.

== Casting ==
Wragg's casting was publicised in February 2014. Wragg decided to accept the role because she liked Essie's introduction into the series. The character made her on-screen debut during the series sixteen episode "My Name Is Joe", which was broadcast on 6 May 2014. Wragg was originally employed by the show as a recurring cast member but was later invited back to play the role on a permanent basis. Wragg also appears as Essie in a two-part crossover episode with Holby City's sister show, Casualty, originally broadcast in March 2019.

== Development ==
=== Characterisation ===
Gregarious and mischievous, Essie is warm, sparky and rebellious. As a nurse, she navigates the rough waters of a challenged healthcare system, doing everything she can to provide her patients with the best care possible, even if that means breaking the rules (and sometimes especially so – sticking it to sticklers gives her an insubordinate thrill).

— BBC Online.

Essie is characterised as warm nurse with a rebellious side and is not afraid to challenge the healthcare system. She makes a great friend for other characters and a writer from BBC Online branded her "a rock". She is an independent female with "spontaneous, emboldening and fun" characteristics. Wragg has labelled Essie as having "a big heart" and being "fantastic" at her nursing job. The actress told Hannah Verdier from TV Magazine that she was enjoying playing the character. She explained that "Estelle's brilliant at her job and she's trying to get on with it, but now she's starting to question herself. She seems really sorted and then all these cracks appear, which makes her great to play." Essie is an opinionated character and does not shy away from voicing them in medical scenarios. Holby City writers clearly demonstrate this when she is played getting herself into trouble with hospital management for interfering with a high-profile patient's choice of surgery.

=== Introduction ===
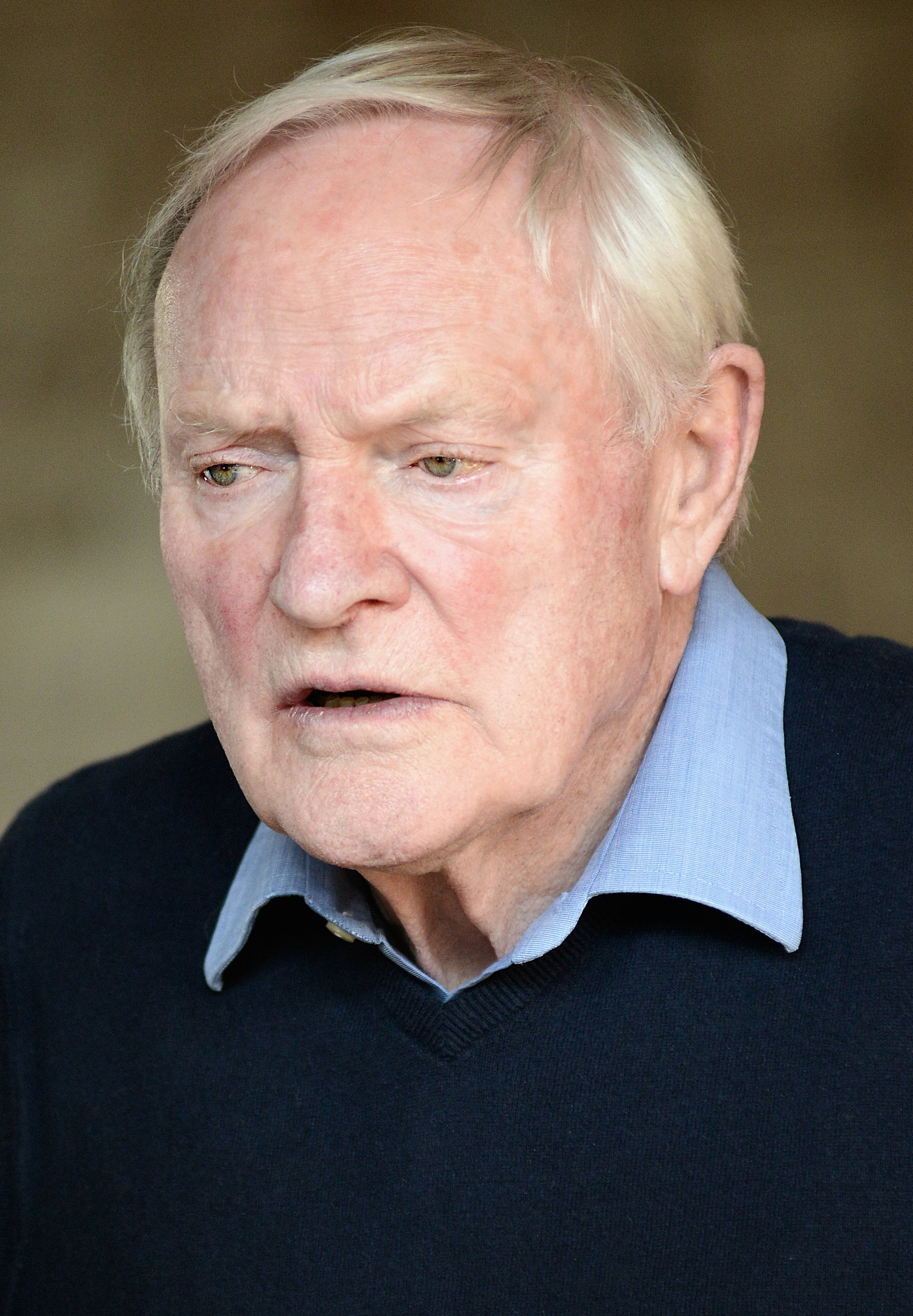
Julian Glover who played Essie's grandfather Joe Goodridge.

Essie is introduced into the show as the granddaughter of sick patient Joe Goodridge (Julian Glover). Wragg was happy that her character's arrival was not linked to nursing. While Joe is being treated on the ward junior doctor Zosia March (Camilla Arfwedson) becomes suspicious of his role in World War II and makes allegations against him. Zosia wants to discover the truth and prevents Joe from signing a form instructing doctors not to revive him. Essie notices the tension between the two but is relieved when Joe is revived. It is then revealed that he is an escaped Nazi war criminal which shocks Essie because she was completely unaware. Wragg told Katy Moon from Inside Soap that Essie and Joe's storyline was unusual and this attracted her to take the role. The story held consequences for Essie as she is forced to deal with the reality of her grandfather's past. Wragg explained "what you find out about Joe is very dramatic, and there are lots of layers for Essie to unravel." Essie was raised by Joe, so she considers him to be her hero and the revelation throws "Essie's world into complete disarray".

Holby City Producer Simon Harper personally decided to create the storyline because he had a European upbringing and studied the Holocaust extensively. He was particularly interested in stories of escaped war criminals and he believed it was inevitable that he would cover the subject during his career. Harper explained to a representative of the Holocaust Educational Trust, that Holby City thrives from stories of character's professional ethics being challenged by their personal demons. He noted that Joe's story worked well against pitted Jewish registrar Sacha Levy (Bob Barrett) having to treat a patient pretending to be "a sweet old man" despite him helping to kill Jews in World War II. The production team was also keen to portray antisemitism in the spotlight. Harper added Kate Verghese, the story producer, pitched the idea of a Jewish doctor being conflicted by a Nazi. Holocaust survivor Kitty Hart-Moxon visited the set to talk to cast and crew of the storyline's importance.

The storyline concluded on-screen as Sacha decided to cancel surgery on Joe because of his Jewish background, despite medical professionals being required to treat all patients equally regardless of their views. Joe's final scenes see Essie and Sacha witness him voicing hateful opinions about the Jewish community. Harper explained that a "final act of repentance" for the character would have been insulting to survivors. Essie is then offered a job at Holby City hospital and she develops a friendship with colleague Sacha. Wragg described their interactions as "lovely" and warned their "spark" could develop into a romance. Rosa Doherty from The Jewish Community said that it was an "unlikely bond" under the circumstances with her grandfather. But they added that the storyline had viewers "gripped" to the show. Essie begins working on the AAU ward. But the newspapers become aware of her situation and run the story. A writer for What's on TV stated that "Essie is plagued with guilt over Josef's past". Sacha decides to take Essie to Wales to escape the negative press attention. Sacha's Jewish mother Esther Levy (Frances Cuka) is furious and orders Sacha to stop seeing Essie.

=== Relationships ===
==== Sacha Levy ====
"She loves that man to pieces. Essie was worried for a while that she'd messed it all up, but the beauty of it is that they're both at an age where they don't want any other relationships."

— Wragg on Essie and Sacha's relationship. (2015)

When Wragg finished filming her original stint on Holby City, producers discussed the possibility of a future return. In October 2014, it was announced that Wragg had been asked to return to the show on a permanent basis. Daniel Kilkelly of Digital Spy reported that Essie would resume her nursing duties at the hospital and her relationship with Sacha. Of her return Wragg stated: "Essie is a such a layered character that I can't wait to see how things unfold once I return. She's a fantastic nurse with a big heart, but a broken life that leaves her unsure of who she is and where she's going. I adore working with Bob Barrett and am very excited to work alongside his big hearted Sacha again, ups and downs regardless. Essie returned to the show during the series seventeen episode titled "Squeeze the Pips" (7 April 2015). Essie's independent nature is sometimes a problem for Sacha because he likes to feel depended upon. Her "slatternly domestic ways" annoy him because it reminds him of his daughters. A BBC Online reporter also revealed that Essie secretly struggles to deal with Sacha's two demanding ex-wives and children.

When she returns Essie reveals that she slept with another man and Sacha no longer wants to be with her. Essie decides to convince Sacha they should be together. Wragg believed that Essie really loves Sacha and she makes him realise that they want the same things out of life, to be "settled and happy". Essie later secures a job as the hospital's new Transplant coordinator. The duo's relationship faces fresh problems when Sacha wants Essie to meet his children. She confides in friend and colleague Dominic Copeland (David Ames) that she is not ready. Essie is convinced that Sacha's Jewish family will not accept her because of her grandfather's past. Barrett told Katy Moon from Inside Soap that Sacha underestimates the situation when he asks her. He also does not consider how his relationship may effect his family. The actor added that Sacha needs to stop being possessive and give Essie some space. Sacha's Wragg told a What's on TV reporter that Essie knows it will be inevitable that Sacha's children will be a part of her life but she is not ready. She is enjoying having Sacha to herself in the early stages of their romance. The actress added "the idea of being the 'stepmum' is a bit frightening for her." Essie tries to make excuses not to see them and Dominic notices her reluctance and makes it more difficult for her to be dishonest. Essie realises she must tell Sacha the truth. Wragg added "Essie realises the situation isn't going to go away. She just wanted to enjoy being in love for a bit longer before the reality of family life kicked in." Essie decides to forget her doubts and go ahead with spending time with Sasha's family.

Months later on-screen Essie's feelings completely changed and she announces that she wants a baby. A What's on TV reporter said the development left Sacha "stunned". Wragg told Laura-Jayne Tyler of Inside Soap that the realisation was unexpected for Essie, but she is of the age and she realises the joy having children creates for women. The actress added that Essie is "madly in love with Sacha" and the physical need for a child takes over. Sasha had already been married twice and shares children with both ex-partners. Wragg believed Sacha has "the best of both worlds" and does not want to ruin his "fantastic" relationship with Essie. In an interview with Daniel Kilkelly of Digital Spy (October 2015), producer Simon Harper declared of his love for the pairing, but warned of his intention to develop the "will they / won't they?' dynamic" further. He explained that writers had planned "big questions" for them to face. The first questioning whether or not Essie has left having children too late in her life. The second being whether Sacha's family will ultimately be able to accept Essie. In September 2016, writers took Essie in a new direction when they decided to end Essie and Sacha's relationship. The scenes featured Essie struggling with the fact she is unable to get pregnant. Sacha admits he never wanted another child and they decide to break-up. Wragg was shocked when she learned that writers ended the relationship.

==== Raf di Lucca ====
Essie was later paired with registrar Raf di Lucca (Joe McFadden) as they embark on a casual relationship. Sacha soon discovers they are involved with each other and confronts them. He does not realise their romance is not serious and in his angst he collapses with chest pain. Barratt told Laura-Jayne Tyler from Inside Soap that their romance played a part in Sacha's despression because it "knocked him for six". McFadden told Tyler that he was surprised when he learned Essie and Raf would become romantically involved. He revealed that he and Wragg enjoyed the playing story with Sacha's jealously. He added that it was interesting that the two characters had both been "longing to have a family of their own." McFadden was also keen for their relationship to be fully explored. Wragg told Tyler that each time they filmed as scene as Essie and Raf in front of Sacha, "it felt like such a betrayal." She added that the crew agreed with her and after several months had pass, the feeling on-set remained the same. Wragg acknowledged that some viewers were "excited" about Essie's relationship with Raf. While others remained loyal to her pairing with Sacha. Wragg liked that the story divided viewer opinion.

The pair end their romance and Raf has a short-lived relationship with drug addict Kim Whitfield (Louisa Clein). Writers soon revisited Raf and Essie's story, with McFadden confirming it would be a serious relationship. The actor stated that Raf develops feelings for Essie because he is not "sophisticated enough" for a friends with benefits arrangement. McFadden stated that Raf is "a bit of a sentimentalist and got attached to her." Essie's professionalism in her nursing role also attracts Rafs to her. McFadden later told Wilson from What's on TV that Essie and Raf are compatible because they are "both traditional" and want a serious relationship. He also thought it would be inevitable that they would clash at times, which he was looking forward to portraying.

Essie fosters teenager Parker Whitfield (Louis Davison), who is the son of Raf's ex-girlfriend Kim. Essie struggles to bond with him, so Raf tries to support Essie and help them. Wragg told What's on TV's Wilson that Essie is inexperienced with caring for a teenager and "doesn't really know how to deal with them." When Raf tries to talk to Parker about Essie, he accidentally reveals that they are in a relationship. Parker is angry with Essie and she feels a failure for not being honest with him. The pair later get along better and her fostering becomes a success. Parker's mother Kim returns and asks Parker to move to Gibraltar with her. He decides to leave and Raf supports Essie through her distress. Of Essie's fostering success, Wragg stated "when Essie took on Parker, it was a big shock for her to suddenly have this very different life, but I always knew she'd be a great mum."

Writers remained committed to developing the couple and in later episodes Raf decides to ask Essie to marry him. Raf reaches his decision when he learns that his brother Giuseppe Di Lucca (Iain Robertson) is being unfaithful to his wife. He realises he could never behave like his sibling. McFadden explained that Raf "realises just how much he loves Essie and how much he wants to commit." McFadden commented that the proposal added "jeopardy" to their relationship because Raf is unsure if she will accept. Essie surprises Raf and agrees to marry him. McFadden explained that their wedding would be low-key because of Raf's need for privacy after his previous failed marriage. Essie and Raf marry in a registry office and do not tell their friends. McFadden told Wilson that the pair did not want any drama at their wedding. When their colleagues find out they make a spectacle of the wedding news. McFadden added that Sacha eventually accepts that Essie marrying Raf is in her best interests. He believed Essie felt "torn" because she does still have feelings for Sacha but cannot be with him. Raf was later killed off when McFadden chose to leave the series. His departure sees him shot dead by Fredrik Johanssen (Billy Postlethwaite).

==== Ben Sherwood ====
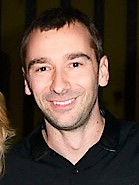
Charlie Condou plays Essie's love interest, Ben Sherwood.

Essie's next relationship is with newly introduced character, locum consultant Ben Sherwood (Charlie Condou). The development was first teased in an advance spoiler trailer. Essie and Ben share a kiss during his debut episode. Condou told Sophie Dainty from Digital Spy that the duo get into a relationship "fairly quickly". Like with Raf before him, Ben has to contend with Essie's on-off relationship with Sacha. Condou commented that their relationship causes tension between Essie and Sacha. Ben and Sacha become "competitors" which is difficult and "very awkward" because Sacha is a "genuinely lovely guy" just like Ben. The situation "tricky" especially as Ben believes he has a long-term future with Essie. Condou added that Ben "definitely falls for Essie in a big way. He really likes her. It's not going to be plain-sailing and very complicated for everyone involved."

Ben was originally scripted as a new "bad guy" in Essie's life, but the production decided to change his personality and play more comedy in the story. Condou told Metro's Calli Kitson that Ben sees himself as "quite confident" and a "ladies man". As scenes air viewers realise that he is not confident. He tries hard to impress Essie but often says the wrong things. Essie initially does not like Ben's flirting due to struggles in her personal life. Condou explained that Ben behaves a "little bit smarmy" and Essie thinks he is behaving like a "twat". She soon realises Ben is just trying to get acquainted with his new colleagues and begins to like him. The actor added that "the relationship is really lovely actually but obviously there's Sacha in the background as the two of them have had an on-off relationship for years."

Writers soon introduced issues into their relationship. Sacha and Dominic reveal a rumour that Ben got a nurse pregnant at his previous hospital after a one-night stand. In another episode, Ben gets close to Dominic and kisses him. Condou told Lorraine Kelly that the situation is "awkward" because Dominic is Essie's best friend. Then Dominic learns that Ben is going to propose to Essie despite their kiss, which makes it "all the more awkward". Ben decides to be honest about his sexuality and comes out as gay. Condou told Sue Crawford of the Metro that "I genuinely believe Ben was in love with Essie and wanted to marry her. I don't think he was conscious of the fact he was living a lie — it's so deeply buried." The story ends with Ben leaving the hospital and Essie getting back together with Sacha. Condou said Ben leaves because he also feels "awkward" and finds it "difficult" that Essie left him for another man.

=== Hostage situation ===
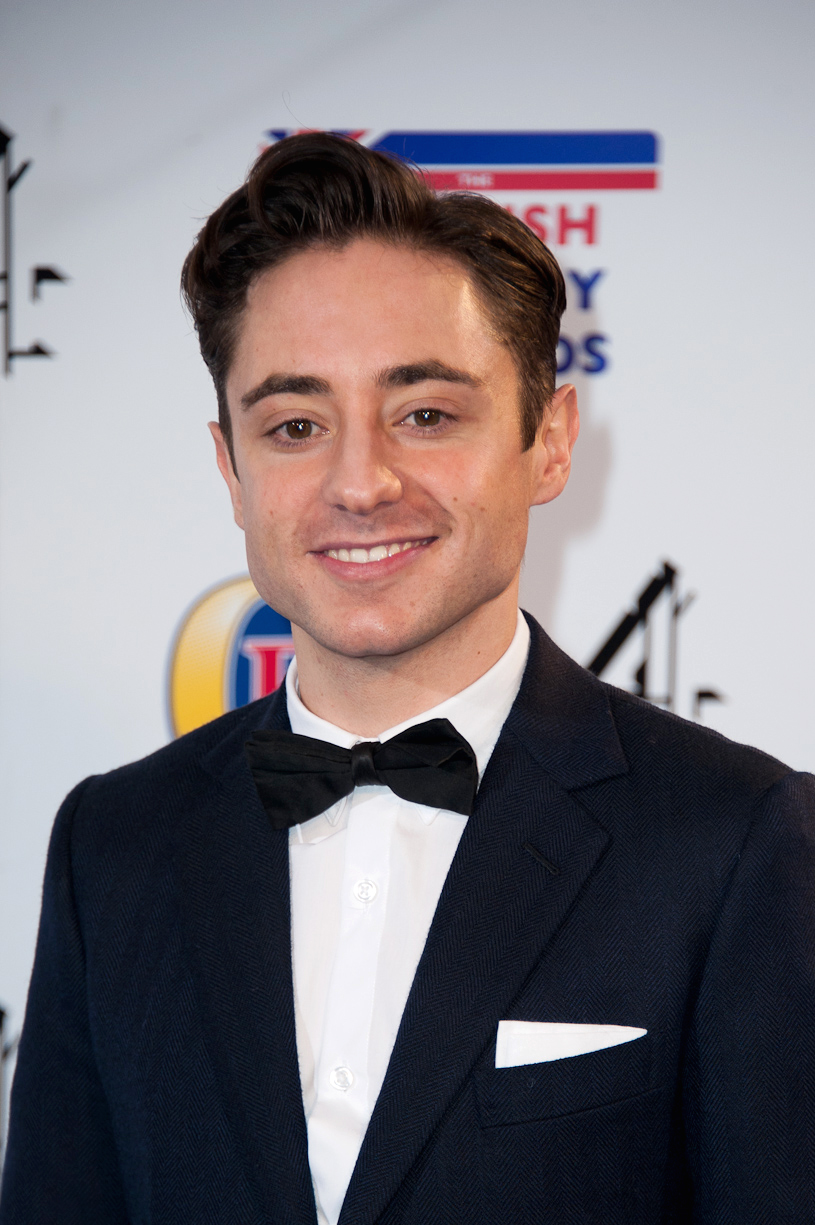
Ryan Sampson plays Ivor Weiland, who takes Essie hostage.

In July 2016, Holby City aired a dramatic hostage situation for Essie. The story begins when Essie treats patient Ivor Weiland (Ryan Sampson) on AAU and she gets along well with Ivor's comedic personality. The following week, Ivor is readmitted to hospital and diagnosed with a pseudoaneurysm and sepsis. He is also suffering from effects of drug withdrawal and he bonds with Essie over his drug addiction. Wragg told What's on TV's Wilson that her character "likes to champion the underdog" and those who appear beyond help. One of Essie's personality traits is her ability to recognise people's "inner turmoil" and help them. Wragg believed that Essie "wants to fight their corner because she knows they've probably had a lot of people turn their back on them, so she immediately keeps the doorway open for them to talk." Despite his appearance, Ivor is a "very charismatic" character and Essie finds his comedy "really charming". She added that "she finds him really endearing" and "sees a really vulnerable person, who needs care and attention."

The scenes become sinister when Ivor decides to seek out morphine to treat his addiction. He goes to the hospital pharmacy where he finds pharmacist Mel Watson (Jocelyn Jee Esien), takes her hostage brandishing an infected needle and pleads for drugs. Essie manages to locate Ivor and tries to convince him to let Mel go, but he takes her hostage too. Wragg explained that Essie puts herself in danger because "she's like a dog with a bone" and thought she could help Ivor. Mel suffers an asthma attack but he forbids Essie from helping her colleague. Despite this, Wragg believed Essie was in control and not frightened of Ivor despite his violent threats. The story helped to showcase Essie's backstory as she tries to talk Ivor down and discloses her own past addictions. Wragg explained that "Essie ends up having to divulge details of her personal life to him. We know Essie was a bit wild in her younger years, but it’s revealed she had drug problems; not to the same level as Ivor, but she certainly understands addiction. But where Essie had support, Ivor’s got nobody. So she wants to be the person that helps him." Essie manages to convince Ivor to set them free. As he does Sacha rushes into the room and pushes Ivor onto broken glass and he ruptures his aneurysm. Wragg praised Sampson's performance and spoke her amazement of his change from comedy character to "real ragged monster". The story also served as a catalyst for relationship problems between Essie and Sacha. Wragg concluded that "this incident wakes Essie up to a lot of home truths."

=== Cancer ===
Wragg took a three-month break from the series in 2018 and teased on Twitter that Essie's story was "not quite over". The show's producer's decided to write Essie out to protect the character. They felt that if Essie had become too involved in John Gaskell's (Paul McGann) evil story, they would have had to kill her off. Essie returns to the series in July 2018 after spending time with Raf's family in Scotland. Wragg told Sue Crawford of Daily Express that Essie left to "catch up with her life". Essie begins to feel unwell while staying with them. Essie decides to return to London to visit a doctor but tries to avoid Holby City hospital. She ends up being taken there after other hospitals are over capacity. Wragg explained that Essie did not want to see her former colleagues and the move was accidental. Henrik Hanssen (Guy Henry) treats Essie and she is diagnosed with ovarian cancer. Wragg believed that Essie had a "unique relationship" with Henrik, she felt able to confide in him and she wanted him to treat her. He tells Essie that she will need to undergo a hysterectomy to survive. Essie is upset because it is a final confirmation that she will never be able to conceive a child of her own. She added that "at this particular point in her life she’s less afraid of the word cancer and more fearful of losing the chance of becoming a mum." The actress found playing a patient very different; she filmed many scenes in a hospital bed and wanted to sleep after finding it hard to focus.

In 2020, producers decided to revisit Essie's cancer story with the disease returning once again. In addition writers decided to portray another cancer story alongside Essie's, featuring Adrian "Fletch" Fletcher (Alex Walkinshaw). Wragg released a statement regarding the plot stating that "showing the real struggle of two nurses sharing an illness together yet being alone in their own torture of what their futures hold is Holby at its best." She described it as "tough" to watch but believed it would resonate well with cancer sufferers. They go on a journey together and learn "their worst fears" and "lost opportunities" amidst an uncertain future. The show's executive producer Simon Harper said that his team originally thought they could not have two cancer stories running concurrently. They later realised they should because cancer statistically affects many people during their lifetime. He described the story as "two most caring nurses now have to care for each other" in their cancer battle. He also hoped it would raise awareness of cancer and praised Wragg and Walkinshaw's "heart-breaking performances". Essie's cancer story resumed during an episode where she attends a regular cancer check up. Dominic attends the appointment with Essie to spare Sacha the worry. Dominic views the scan and tells a devastated Essie that her cancer has returned.

=== Unauthorised parenting ===
In 2019, producers devised an unauthorised parenting story for the character. When Frankie Rendell (Sophie Harkness) is admitted to Keller, she reveals that she is Raf's relative. Frankie tells Essie that she is unable to cope with her baby, Isla and wants Essie to take care of her, which she agrees to. Wragg told Daniel Kilkelly from Digital Spy that "Essie became a mum in a very unconventional manner. Technically, she has a child that isn't hers, and by law, shouldn't still have. There are going to be future complications with that and also future happiness." Viewers wrote on the social networking website Twitter that they were worried for Essie during the story. She commented that they "see the goodness in the story and Essie cares for Isla for "the right reasons". Essie does not want Isla taken into care and knows she can offer a good home. The actress added that "despite the good reasons behind it, it is legally and ethically wrong."

In one episode Isla becomes ill and Essie is unaware of her medical history. Wragg branded it "tiny highlight" of the issues that arise from unauthorised parenting. The need for Isla's medical history leads Essie to tell Sacha the truth. He decides to keep quiet and let her continue to care for Isla. Essie tells other characters that she has adopted Isla. Wragg said that even Essie is beginning to believe Isla is her own child. She envisions a "little family unit". Wragg added "Sacha is the only one that is in cahoots and when someone is part of your lie and they keep it a secret, you can believe it even more." As the story progresses, Essie begins dating Ben and eventually decides to tell him the truth about Isla. Essie eventually tells Fletch the truth who decides to involve social services to make a final decision about Isla's care.

=== Departure and return ===
McFadden confirmed in July 2020 that Essie would be leaving Holby City at the conclusion of her cancer story. Appearing in a behind-the-scenes video released by the show, the actor revealed that the story forms Wragg's exit from the show. Laura Denby, writing for the Radio Times, hoped that Essie's death would have "a profound effect on every character" and expected it to "change the show forever". Essie departs in the twenty-fifth episode of series 22, broadcast on 11 August 2020. The character is killed-off as she prepares for her wedding to Sacha and her death featuring in the episode had not been revealed prior to transmission. Wragg's departure were one of the final scenes filmed before Holby City paused production due to the COVID-19 pandemic and featured in the show's final episode before going on a transmission break.

Holby City was cancelled in June 2021 after 23 years on air with the final episode due to be broadcast in March 2022. Producers invited multiple former cast members to reprise their roles during the show's final series. Advanced spoilers for episode 1100, first broadcast on 15 March 2022, revealed that Wragg had reprised her role as Essie. Further details surrounding her appearance were not released until 9 March 2022, when it was revealed that Essie would return as a vision to Jac Naylor (Rosie Marcel), who is terminally ill. Essie's appearance serves as a "manifestation" about Jac's fears of dying.

== Reception ==
For her portrayal of Essie, Wragg was nominated for Best Drama Star at the 2020 Inside Soap Awards. Tyler (Inside Soap) wrote that she and audiences "were thrilled" that Essie returned to the series. She noted that Essie and Sasha had a turbulent relationship, adding "it's not always been plain sailing for the pair." A writer from What's on TV similarly stated that "Essie and Sacha's relationship has certainly had its ups and downs." Their colleague, Victoria Wilson was delighted that Essie chose Sacha over Ben following a proposal of marriage. She commented that upon watching "We were like a proud mum at the school nativity play."
