= Lucky Simpson =

- Holby City character
- Vineeta Rishi as Lucky Simpson
- First appearance: "Episode 1036"; 24 November 2020
- Last appearance: "Episode 1085"; 16 November 2021
- Portrayed by: Vineeta Rishi

In-universe information
- Occupation: Mental health nurse

Lucky Simpson is a fictional character from the BBC medical drama Holby City, played by Vineeta Rishi. She first appeared in Episode 28 of the show's twenty-second series, broadcast on 24 November 2020. Lucky arrives at Holby City hospital to work as a mental health nurse. To aid her introduction into the series, writers created a backstory with established character Max McGerry (Jo Martin). BBC publicity also released an advance spoiler trailer showcasing the character's debut. Lucky is characterised as a "warm, empathetic and unnervingly intelligent" nurse. She has a tendency to always think she is right and dislikes being proven wrong. Lucky's main stories included her involvement with Kian Madani's (Ramin Karimloo) drug addiction story, in which she behaves unethically and micro-doses him. Lucky also helps Kian hide Andrei Tarpov (Sonny Poon Tip) in the UK illegally. When Karimloo left the series, producers killed Kian off and writers used this to portray Lucky having a breakdown at work. Other stories include a feud with Jeni Sinclair (Debra Stephenson) and breaking patient confidentiality.

Lucky's most notable story is her portrayal of tetraplegia, which occurs after she is violently attacked by Jeni. Holby City worked with spinal injury charity Aspire on the storyline to make it authentic. Lucky initially wants the right to die but she eventually changes her mind. Writers wanted to show that people who have life changing injuries can still survive and adapt to a new lifestyle. Rishi's final scenes as Lucky aired in the show's thirty-third episode of the show's final series, which was broadcast on 16 November 2021.

== Development ==
=== Creation and characterisation ===
Warm, empathetic and unnervingly intelligent, Lucky is the sort of woman who could easily have you divulging your life story in a matter of minutes. And it’s just as well, as getting people to open up is her life’s work. She’s both an avid listener and a vivacious talker – the sort of person who makes you feel instantly at ease. With an infectious smile and a mischievous sense of humour, it’s hard not to succumb to her charms.

— An excerpt from Lucky's profile on the official Holby City website.

The character and Rishi's casting details were announced on 29 October 2020. The character is created as a mental health nurse introduced following the show's four-month production break enforced by the COVID-19 pandemic. Kate Oates, the head of continuing drama at BBC Studios, described Lucky as one of the "exciting new characters" being introduced. To promote Lucky's introduction into the series, Holby City released an advance spoiler clip showcasing her debut scenes with various characters. Lucky makes her first appeared in Episode 28 of the show's twenty-second series, which was broadcast on 24 November 2020.

Lucky is characterised as "warm, empathetic and unnervingly intelligent". A writer from the official Holby City website described her as excellent at her job and is both "an avid listener and a vivacious talker". Lucky enjoys a gossip with her co-workers, but is aware that people are cautious of her due to her job role and her tendency to psycho analyse people. Lucky also enjoys adding humour to her role at the hospital. They added that Lucky does have negative aspects to her personality because she "always thinks she knows best and doesn’t take well to being proven wrong." This creates issues in her stories with other characters and being the "smartest person" in the scene has "setbacks" for her. Lucky likes to help people regardless of her own plight. Rishi told Victoria Wilson from Whattowatch.com that "my husband thinks Lucky's a busy-body - and that I'm a bit like her!"

=== Introduction ===
The character is introduced after being hired by Michael Townsend (Elliot Levey), the chairman of the hospital board, to help the hospital staff following the pandemic. She shares a backstory with established character Max McGerry (Jo Martin) which is explored as part of Lucky's first storyline. When Lucky arrives at the hospital, Max is not pleased with her presence and they soon argue. As the hospital CEO, Max asserts her authority over Lucky and informs her they will not be working together as equals. Martin told Victoria Wilson from What's on TV that Max "has no filter" or does not "deal in political correctness", so she thinks nothing of belittling Lucky. Other colleagues, such as director of nursing Adrian "Fletch" Fletcher (Alex Walkinshaw) notice their workplace tension and ask Lucky about her history with Max. It soon becomes clear that Lucky likes to involve herself in the well-being of hospital staff. Max discovers that Lucky has been supporting her transgender son Louis McGerry (Tyler Luke Cunningham) outside of work. Unable to accept Lucky advising her son about his transition, Max threatens to sack Lucky if she does not resign. Lucky remains adamant that she will not be bullied out of the hospital. Martin explained that the tirade is more to do with Max's "demons" and "sadness" in her own life than Lucky's meddling.

Writers continued to involve Lucky in other characters stories as they immersed her into the series. First, Lucky becomes suspicious of Jodie Rodgers (Sian Reese-Williams) and starts to investigate her past. Lucky correctly suspects that Jodie is poisoning Beka Levy (Francesca Barrett) and may have Munchausen's syndrome. Lucky meets with Jodie's ex-boyfriend who confirms her scheming behaviour. When Sacha Levy (Bob Barrett) also becomes ill from poisoning, Lucky manages to convince Jodie to confess to her crimes. Lucky figures out what Jodie has poisoned them with and saves their lives. Jodie agrees to let Lucky help her, but Sacha's anger causes her to flee. Jodie later returns and is concerned by Lucky's presence. Reese-Williams told Wilson (What's on TV) that Jodie feels threatened by Lucky because she was the only one who figured out her deception. She explained that seeing Lucky with Sacha makes her flee the hospital and a dramatic car accident occurs.

=== Kian Madani ===
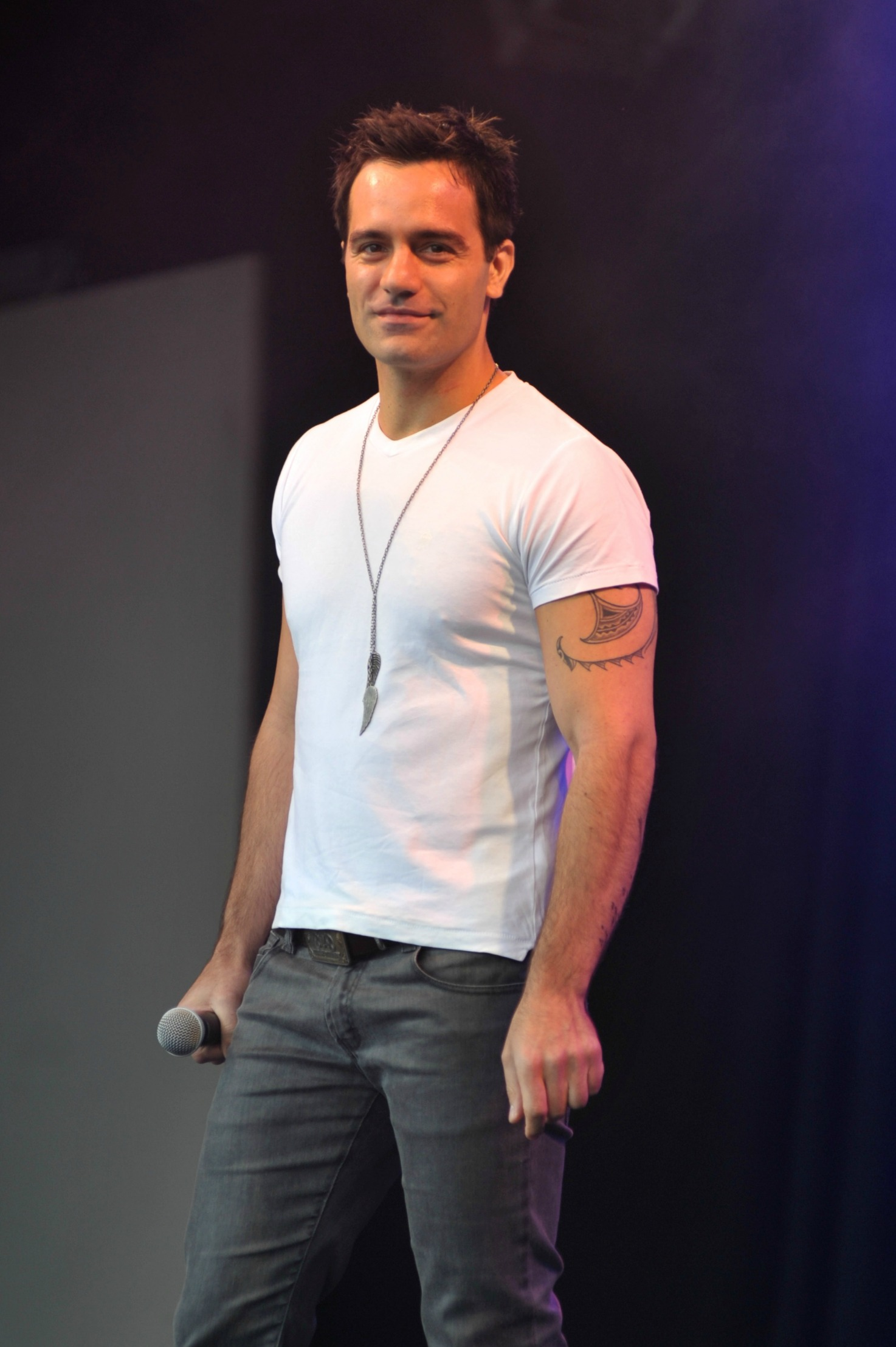
Ramin Karimloo who plays Lucky's friend Kian Madani.

Writers introduced Lucky into surgeon Kian Madani's (Ramin Karimloo) drug addiction storyline. She decides to support him through his addiction and offers her counsel. The more time Lucky spends with Kian, she begins to develop romantic feelings for him. Writers conveyed this via the use of a dream sequence in which Lucky imagines herself in a passionate kiss with Kian. Lucky's dream makes her realise the extent of her feelings but she continues to meddle in his personal life. In addition, Kian becomes over invested in his patient, Andrei Tarpov's (Sonny Poon Tip) welfare. Andrei is on the run from drug dealers and illegally in the United Kingdom. Lucky and Kian agree that the social services need contacting to help Andrei out of trouble. Kian breaks his promise to Lucky and decides to sneak Andrei out of the hospital. Kian then moves Andrei into his flat.

Lucky's professional judgement is challenged by helping Kian and Andrei. Lucky decides to not report Andrei to the social services to allow him to receive heart surgery. Andrei goes missing but his girlfriend Evie Fletcher (Phoebe French) finds him badly beaten and they rush to perform surgery. Evie's father, Fletch discovers the truth and issues Lucky with an ultimatum about the social services. Producers decided that Lucky's friendship with Kian would deteriorate in the episodes prior to Karimloo's departure. This begins when Lucky decides to contact her friend from the social services Connor Coleman (Mark Jordon) to help Andrei. Lucky later discloses her romantic feelings but they are unrequited. Karimloo told What's on TV's Wilson that "the affection they have for one another hasn't been interpreted the same way."

When Andrei needs another operation to save his life, Lucky unsuccessfully tries to cancel Connor's visit. When he arrives, Kian accuses Lucky of betraying him and fears losing Andrei. Andrei and Evie react by running from the hospital. Fletch reacts badly and punches Kian. Walkinshaw explained that Fletch is aggressive because Kian and Lucky have involved Evie in Andrei's problems. Andrei and Evie are stabbed by the drug gang and require surgery at the hospital. Fletch bans Kian from operating on Evie, which sends Kian on a downward spiral with drugs again. Karimloo did not believe that Kian and Lucky could have solved a drug addiction and Andrei's problems alone. He told Wilson that "Kian and Lucky have got in over their heads with what they're trying to fix." Kian takes a drug overdose and dies as a result. Writers played on this to create dramatic scenes for Lucky, having a breakdown at work. Lucky decides to concentrate on work instead of grieving Kian's death. She breaks patient confidentiality and Chloe Godard (Amy Lennox) confronts her on the ward. Lucky responds by shouting at her colleagues and blaming them for Kian's death. When they discover Lucky was concealing Kian's addiction by micro-dosing him, she is forced to take leave. Unbeknownst to Lucky, her sudden departure from the hospital is partly caused by Jeni Sinclair's (Debra Stephenson) scheming. It formed part of a new mystery story in which viewers were left guessing Jeni's motives. Despite her sudden departure, Sophie Dainty from Digital Spy reported that Lucky's exit was only temporary.

=== Tetraplegia ===
"You don't really see people in these situations be positive about themselves, but what we're exploring here is that, yes, these horrible situations can happen but people find ways to deal with them and make the most of them. It's important to show there is life after trauma."

—Vineeta Rishi discussing the Lucky's tetraplegia story. (2021)

Writers created a challenging storyline for Rishi in which Lucky becomes tetraplegic. To research the story, the show's writers teamed with spinal injury charity, Aspire. With them they were able to offer a more realistic depiction of what happens to someone with injuries leaving them tetraplegic. The story begins from her feud with Jeni. When Lucky returns she is determined to expose Jeni's lies and discovers that she has been grooming Evie and Mia Barron (Briana Shann). Lucky sneaks into Jeni's office to find evidence but is caught by Jeni. Realising that Lucky will expose her, Jeni brutally attacks Lucky. A Holby City publicist told Laura-Jayne Tyler from Inside Soap that it is a "violent confrontation" and Jeni "smashes Lucky over the head with a paperweight." Jeni leaves Lucky to die as a bomb planted by Cameron Dunn (Nic Jackman) detonates in the hospital. Digital Spy's Dainty reported that a character would die in the bomb explosion storyline and Lucky was a possible fatality. However, in the next episode Lucky is found and admitted to the ward with a serious head injury that requires surgery. Lucky's colleagues do not understand how she received the injury. When Lucky awakes from her surgery, Max informs her that she is tetraplegic. Rishi told Wilson that Lucky "goes through different stages of grief". In addition she feels "shock, disbelief and self-pity." Lucky has visions of a nurse called Cassie who insults her and attempts to help. Rishi explained that Cassie is a "reflection of what's going on in her head" and the "thoughts she's battling". Lucky decides to distract herself by offering Fletch advice. Rishi believed it showed that Lucky still had "the emotional skills she's always had". When Max informs Lucky her tetraplegia is permanent, she loses all hope.

Lucky asks Max for help to end her life, but she refuses. Nurse Kylie Maddon (Amy Murphy) begins to help care for Lucky and tries to cheer her up. Rishi admitted that Lucky's "predicament" is "difficult to get your head around". She had to try her best to imagine how Lucky would be feeling. Having a friend and colleague have to bathe her makes Lucky more determined to die. Kylie tries to change Lucky's mind by taking her outside and sharing some photographs. When Lucky sees a photograph of her in a wheel chair she is horrified. Rishi said that Lucky is more determined to end her life and faces "desperate times". She added that Lucky takes advantage of Kylie. Lucky thinks of another way to commit suicide and tricks Kylie by claiming to have already received her medicine. Kylie then gives Lucky an extra dose of medication.

Lucky goes into cardiac arrest but is promptly resuscitated. Rishi thought it was a shame Lucky tricked Kylie because Lucky "always had a soft spot" for Kylie and they had a "really lovely relationship". Kylie is not deterred and arranges for Lucky's old friend Alex Burton (Mykel Willams) to visit. He is in a wheelchair and previously relied on Lucky's psychiatric care. Rishi explained that Alex's presence is "uplifting" for Lucky because she sees his humour and "spark" for life. Rishi claimed that Holby City wanted to portray positivity in a disability story. Writers showed despite Lucky's situation being unbearable, people still find a way to survive. She believed it was important that Lucky's story showed you can still have a life after severe body trauma. Rishi departed the show in 2021 and Lucky makes her exit in the thirty-third episode of the show's final series, which was broadcast on 16 November 2021. In her final scenes, Lucky is readmitted to the hospital with an infection. She continues to argue with Max about wanting to die. Louis intervenes and his words make Lucky accept her condition. Lucky leaves in a taxi to the care home and parts on good terms with Max.

== Reception ==
A writer from Inside Soap said that Lucky's introduction into the series created tension on the wards that "can be cut with a scalpel". Claire Ruck from What's on TV chose Lucky's debut in their television pick of the week feature. Ruck later chose Lucky's breakdown over Kian's death and feud with Jeni in the pick of the week feature. Digital Spy's Dainty opined that Lucky's "unethical behaviour" had become severe during her story with Kian and Andrei. She added that "Lucky's house of cards come tumbling down" when she oversteps her duties with patients. Victoria Wilson (Whattowatch.com) described Lucky as "ever the professional". She sympathised with Lucky's breakdown because Kian's death "hit her pretty hard". Sue Haasler from Metro observed that Lucky continually allowed "her personal feelings cloud her judgement with patients."

TVTimes included Lucky's debut and her tetraplegia stories in their "pick of the day" feature. Of Lucky's life-changing injuries, a writer from TVTimes stated "It's hard to watch as Lucky goes through her turmoil but we applaud Holby for again tackling a real-life issue with great sensibility." In another feature they described Lucky discovering the truth about Jeni as marking "a turning point in what's been a compelling plot." The spinal injury charity Aspire released a statement detailing that "we'll be watching with interest and hoping that as Lucky’s story unfolds it gives a realistic portrayal of life with a spinal cord injury." Charlie Wilward from the Daily Express opined that Lucky's tetraplegia created "heartbreaking scenes" and her "storyline came to a natural conclusion".
