= Ben Sherwood (Holby City) =

Fictional character from Holby City

- Holby City character
- Charlie Condou as Ben Sherwood
- First appearance: "Be True, Be Brave, Be Kind"; 19 December 2019
- Last appearance: Episode 1019; 24 March 2020
- Portrayed by: Charlie Condou

In-universe information
- Occupation: Locum consultant general surgeon
- Significant other: Essie Di Lucca

Ben Sherwood is a fictional character from the BBC medical drama Holby City, played by actor Charlie Condou. He first appears in the series twenty-one episode "Be True, Be Brave, Be Kind", originally broadcast on 19 December 2019. Ben is a locum consultant general surgeon. Condou's casting was announced on 3 September 2019 and he began filming at the show's studios that same month. Condou had been in contact with the show's casting team about a part on the drama for years prior to securing the role and he was offered the part without an audition.

Ben is characterised as pleasant, sensitive, sweet and wealthy. He likes to consider himself a "ladies' man" when he often appears foolish. Writers originally devised the character as a villain, but changed his personality following Condou's casting. Ben's introductory storyline focuses on a relationship with nurse Essie Di Lucca (Kaye Wragg), which was challenged by Sacha Levy's (Bob Barrett) feelings for her and rumours about Ben's previous relationships during his last job. The story ends when Essie rejects Ben's proposal of marriage in favour of a relationship with Sacha.

The character's sexuality is explored after he kisses registrar Dominic Copeland (David Ames). Ben's story was likened to the coming out of television personality Phillip Schofield and Condou felt it was realistic for Ben to be in a relationship with Essie but also feel conflicted about his sexuality. Condou was contracted to Holby City for three months and his sexuality story leads to his exit in episode 11 of series twenty-two, originally broadcast on 24 March 2020. Critics have demonstrated a mixed response to the character and his stories: Lorraine Kelly liked the character and hoped he would return, while Sue Haasler of the Metro called Ben "cocky".

== Casting ==
On 3 September 2019, it was announced that actor Charlie Condou had joined the cast as Ben Sherwood, a locum consultant on the general surgical ward, Keller. Condou expressed his delight at joining the cast and teased that Ben would "definitely be ruffling a few feathers". Simon Harper, the show's executive producer, praised Condou and said that the drama was "lucky" to hire him. He added that he was looking forward to seeing Ben "causing a stir and getting under the skin of his colleagues on Keller!" Condou began filming in September 2019 and posted an image of him in costume to his Instagram account.

Condou had contacted the Holby City casting team for multiple years before his casting and sent the executive producer a letter asking him to consider him for any role they thought he would suit. When they created the character of Ben, they remembered Condou and offered him the part. The actor felt pressured to prove himself because he did not audition for the role and did not want the producers to regret their decision. Condou was only contracted to Holby City for a three-month stint and the story team had the character's story arc planned. When Condou visited the filming schedule office on his first day, he noticed that they had already scheduled his exit. The actor confirmed that he would portray a "really big story", but he was unsure whether Ben would be reintroduced for a longer stint in the future.

Ben's position as a consultant required Condou to learn medical terminology and a doctor's examination routine, something which he struggled to do as well as the general dialogue and acting. Condou utilised the show's on-set medical advisors to explain to him what the terminology meant, so he could better his performance. He also enjoyed seeing the prosthetic makeup and praised the work of the prosthetics team. The actor admitted that he is "squeamish" and has a fear of needles. He found that working on Holby City helped him create a healthy work-life balance as he only lives 45 minutes away from the set. He told Calli Kitson of the Metro that he has enjoyed working on the drama and felt accepted into the cast. Condou was highly publicised for playing Marcus Dent in the British soap opera Coronation Street and compared working there to working on Holby City, explaining that he preferred the smaller cast featured on Holby City. He commented, "You do feel like you're going to work with your family, really."

== Development ==
=== Characterisation ===
Ben is billed as "a charming, alpha consultant who will be stirring up the dynamics in the hospital". Condou described Ben as "suave", "a good guy", and a "genuinely lovely bloke". Ben considers himself to be a romancer and "ladies' man", but he is not actually; Condou opined that Ben is actually "quite nervous and awkward", something which is demonstrated in his first episodes. He added that Ben often tries impressing people, but struggles and normally "puts his foot in it" and looks foolish. Speaking on daytime talkshow Loose Women, Condou dubbed Ben "a clumsy Casanova". The actor characterised Ben as "very sensitive, quite sweet, and very genuine", but also with the ability to be funny and troublesome. Ben also dislikes confrontation and arguing with people. Condou hoped that the audience would warm to the character because they will be able to understand his struggle.

Writers originally decided Ben would be a villainous character, but when Condou was cast, they decided to change his personality and make the character a good person. Condou hoped that the audience would not see any "malice" with the character. The backstory created for Ben states that he has spent time working in the private sector of medicine, which has made him wealthy and "a bit flash with his money". Condou did not believe that this was reflected in Ben's characterisation and instead, he believed that Ben is "at a bit of a loss in his life". Ben has also spent time working for the National Health Service (NHS) in a position at neighbouring St James Hospital.

=== Introduction and relationship with Essie Di Lucca ===
When the character was announced, it was confirmed that Ben would have a love interest. His introduction was teased in a show trailer released on 4 December 2019 and scenes from the trailer made Kitson (Metro) think that the love interest could be staff nurse Essie Di Lucca (Kaye Wragg), which is later confirmed through advanced spoilers. Condou liked the pairing of Ben and Essie and predicted that Essie would "fall for Ben". Ben and Essie's relationship develops fast and Ben hopes that it will become a long-term relationship. Condou explained that Ben "definitely falls for Essie in a big way", but he also predicted that the relationship would have its complications. The story also features Essie's former partner and friend, Sacha Levy (Bob Barrett), when the relationship creates tension between Essie and Sacha. Condou thought that the situation with Sacha would be "awkward" because Ben and Sacha are similar people but are also "competitors in a sense". Barrett enjoyed filming the story with Condou, calling it "marvellous" to portray love rivals.

Ben makes his first appearance in the series twenty-one episode "Be True, Be Brave, Be Kind", originally broadcast on 19 December 2019. Ben joins Keller ward as a locum doctor. He is excitable and nervous as he arrives and searches for lead consultant Sacha, who he believes is a woman. He soon makes a bad first impression with Essie, who is having a terrible day, when he bumps into her and flirts and jokes with her. Condou explained that Ben arrives and is "a little bit smarmy", but Essie views his actions as "being a little bit of a twat". Essie soon realises that Ben is only trying to fit in and gives him a second chance. Condou told Kitson (Metro) that Ben wants to be accepted by his new colleagues and pointed out that Ben finds Essie attractive, which leads to them sharing a kiss. The kiss between Ben and Essie was the first scene that Condou filmed, which he found "difficult" because he had never met her before. Despite this, he found it "simple" to film due to how welcomed he felt within the cast. Condou told Digital Spy's Sophie Dainty that he found his first day on-set "nerve-wracking".

After a successful few weeks with Ben, Essie decides that she wants to tell him about her illegal adoption of Isla, a relative's newborn daughter. Registrar Dominic Copeland (David Ames) learns through gossip that Ben is a "nurse in every ward kind of guy" and has impregnated a nurse after a one-night stand at his previous job. He warns Essie, who decides to end their relationship and not tell Ben her secret. Essie soon changes her mind after patient Maria Edelman (Susan Engel) encourages her to follow love. Ben and Essie then rekindle their romance, which devastates Sacha. Ben later plans a romantic Valentine's Day for him and Essie.

Ben arranges a romantic holiday to Rome for him, Essie and Isla. When they return, Essie seems "happier than ever" to be with Ben, however, she becomes confused with her feelings upon seeing Sacha again. She begins to consider whether she is "in fact with the wrong man". Ben then decides to propose to Essie, forcing her to choose between Ben and Sacha. Sacha finds out about the proposal and races to tell Essie about his feelings, but fears he is too late when he spots Essie and Ben hugging. However, Essie then reveals to Sacha that she has declined Ben's proposal because she wants to be with him instead. In the aftermath, Ben feels "scorned" about being rejected and when he discovers that Essie ended their relationship to pursue one with Sacha, Ben tells Dom about Essie's secret regarding Isla. Condou explained that Ben feels "awkward and difficult" about Essie leaving him for Sacha.

=== Sexuality and departure ===
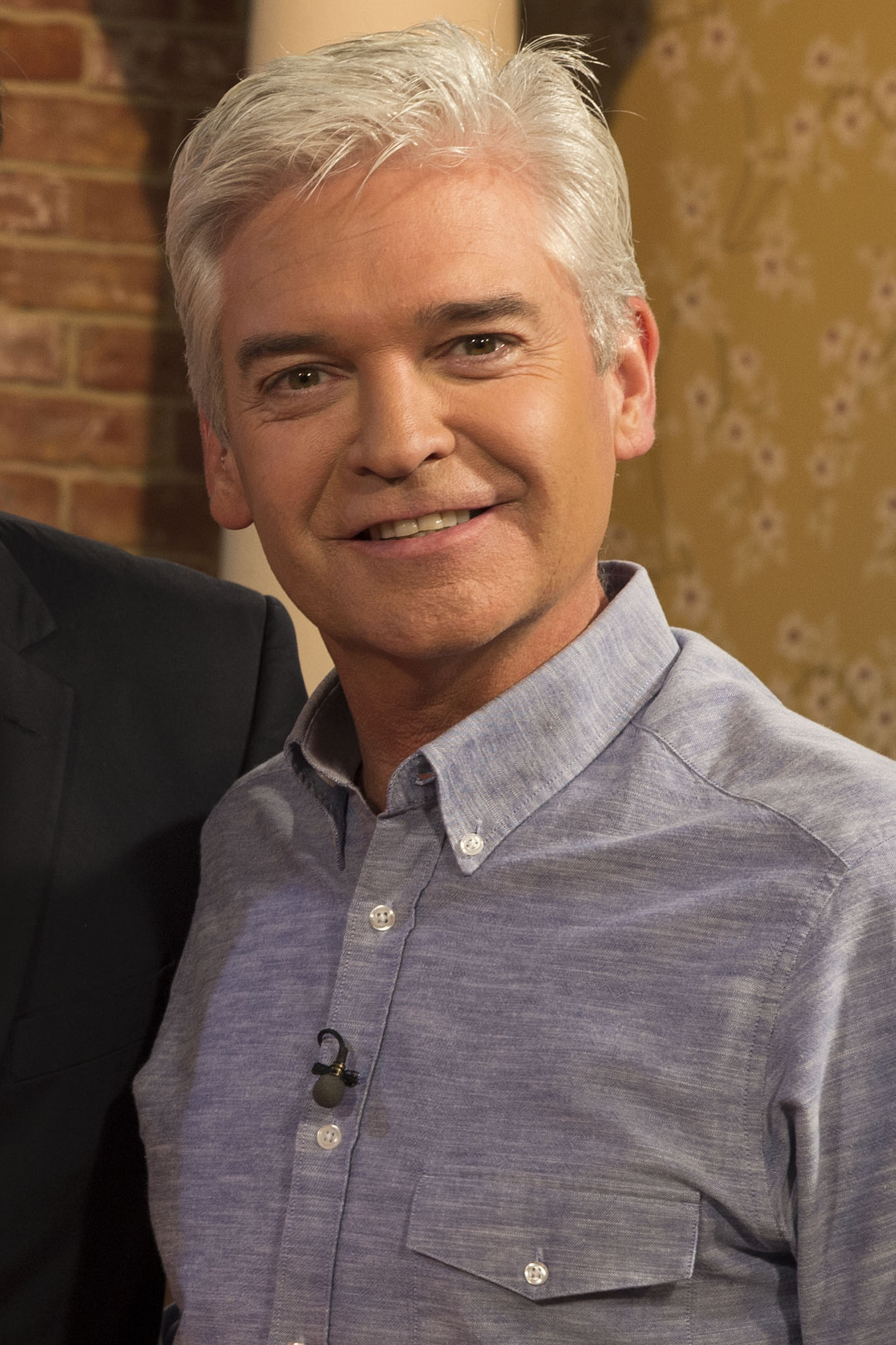
Condou compared Ben's story to the coming out of television personality Phillip Schofield (pictured).

It was reported on 12 February 2020 that Ben would kiss Dom after he experiences a challenging shift. When surgeon Henrik Hanssen (Guy Henry) experiences complications operating on Dom's mother, Carole Copeland (Julia Deakin), he asks for Ben's assistance. Having not been informed about the complications, Dom is annoyed and confronts Ben about this. Ben supports him and acts as a "knight in shining armour" figure to Dom. When Dom breaks down following the shift, Ben comforts him and suddenly kisses him, leaving Dom surprised and confused. Condou was surprised by the plot twist and thought it would create an "awkward" situation for Ben, Dom and Essie. Condou thought it was realistic for Ben to be in a relationship with Essie, but also feel conflicted about his sexuality, comparing it to the story of television personality Phillip Schofield, who came out in February 2020. The actor discussed Ben's feelings for Essie with Harper and they agreed that Ben is not lying about his feelings for Essie and that being the "life he wanted", a similar situation to Schofield. He subsequently questioned whether Ben could be bisexual.

When Ben returns from his holiday with Essie, Dom confronts him about their kiss. Ben dismisses his concerns and promises that he and Essie are strong together. Consequently, Dom decides not to tell Essie about the kiss. Condou explained that Ben does want a long-term relationship with Essie, but it is a "very complicated" situation. However, when Dom confronts Essie over her secret, he also admits that Ben kissed him. Ben becomes paranoid as a result of Dom outing him to Essie and when he spots her laughing with other nurses, he reminds her about her secrets.

Holby City introduced the use of NHS rainbow badges in their costumes to coincide with Ben's story. The suggestion was made by This Morning's resident doctor, Ranj Singh, who asked Harper if the drama could feature them as a reflection on the NHS, who use the badges as a message of inclusion. Harper liked the idea and incorporated the badges into Ben's story. Harper explained that they would be "at the heart of the big story where Ben (Charlie Condou) struggles to accept his sexuality and come out of the closet".

Following the release of Holby City's spring trailer, Dainty (Digital Spy) confirmed that Ben's sexuality story would lead to his exit from the drama. The reporter also revealed that actor Paul Clayton had reprised his guest role as Roger Ffolkes for the story. Clayton features in Ben's final episode as his character encourages Ben to "be true to himself". Condou explained that as a "no-nonsense" gay man, Roger immediately recognises that Ben is hiding something and eventually realises that Ben is struggling with his sexuality. On how Roger feels towards Ben's situation, Condou commented, "I think for a lot of gay men who come out, they can feel quite angry at those who aren't being true to themselves because they think that lifestyle is difficult and they don't want to do it." Roger then encourages Ben to come out, but Ben admits that he has struggled to confront his sexuality since witnessing the 1999 London nail bombings, a terrorist attack which targeted gay people. Condou liked the scenes, describing them as "lovely", and told Laura-Jayne Tyler of Inside Soap that he actually witnessed the attacks at the time so he was pleased when writers mentioned them in the script.

Following his conversations with Roger, Ben decides that he should leave the hospital and "spend a bit of time trying to figure out who he is". Before leaving, he reconciles with Essie and Sacha, which Condou was pleased with because he thought that the trio "all care very much for each other". Ben's exit features in episode 11 of series twenty-two, originally broadcast on 24 March 2020. Condou expressed his interest in returning to the role and hoped that producers would like him to return. He told Tyler that should a story for Ben arise, he would "go back in a heartbeat". He also confirmed that the "door is left open" for Ben to return and the character would be working in his private medical practice in a neighbouring hospital.

== Reception ==
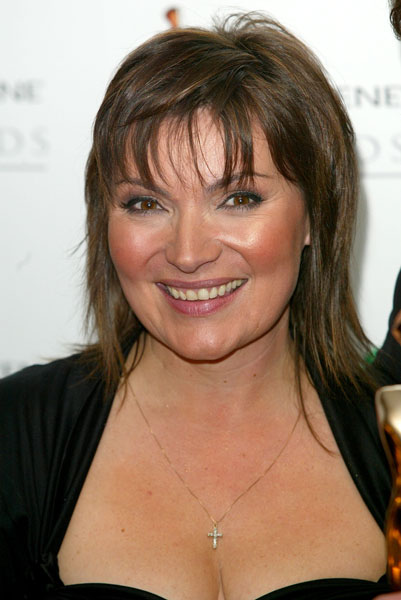
Television presenter Lorraine Kelly (pictured) praised the character.

Lidia Molina-Whyte of the Radio Times dubbed Ben the "swanky new consultant", while Sue Haasler, writing for the Metro, described Ben as the "cocky new Keller doctor". Television presenter Lorraine Kelly spoke on her daytime television show, Lorraine about how she enjoyed the character and how she felt Condou was "a perfect fit" for Holby City, hoping he would return after his initial stint. Condou received response from fans who wanted to see Essie with Sacha rather than Ben. An Inside Soap columnist called Ben's proposal to Essie a "romantic curveball". Haasler (Metro) was pleased when Essie chose Sacha in favour of Ben. The critic wrote that in the aftermath of his rejected proposal to Essie, Ben "sulks", but found the character to be "deeply hurt and affronted" when Essie suggests he would share her secret. She also disliked the behaviour of Ben, Essie and Dom, deeming it "a bit playground-ish and immature". Ailbhe MacMahon of the Daily Star opined that Ben's behaviour portrayed him as "bitter".

The character's sexuality story was met with mixed critical response. Joe Anderton from Digital Spy predicted that not "everyone would be too thrilled" about Ben's interest in Dom, while Haasler (Metro) and Kelly (Lorraine) both found the twist where Ben kisses Dom surprising, with Kelly calling it "an interesting development". A reporter for Entertainment Daily opined that should Ben and Dom begin a relationship, it would be "problematic". They also thought that Ben's motives to help Dom were "more 'opportunist' than 'knight in shining armour'." Viewers took to Twitter to express how they were shocked by the twist. Charlie Milward of the Daily Express called the aftermath of Ben and Dom's kiss "explosive", and Doug Lambert from ATV Today included the aftermath of Ben and Essie's secrets being revealed as a highlight of the day's television. At the conclusion of Ben's story, Haasler (Metro) wrote, "This was a different take on why someone might choose to be in the closet and for anyone who might mutter that shows like Holby have too many gay characters it was a powerful reminder why these stories have to be told."
