= Ben Sherwood (disambiguation) =

Ben Sherwood (born 1964) is a media executive.

Benjamin or Ben Sherwood may also refer to:

- Ben Sherwood (Holby City), a character from Holby City
- Ben Sherwood, a character in Hard Guy
- Benjamin Sherwood, a character in Wizards vs Aliens
