= Vineeta Rishi =

English actress

- Born: Bracknell, Berkshire, England
- Education: University of Bradford; Mountview Academy of Theatre Arts
- Occupation: Actress
- Years active: 2002–present
- Known for: Jas Khella in Doctors

Vineeta Rishi is an English actress known for playing Jas Khella in the BBC One soap opera Doctors.

== Early life ==
Born in Bracknell, Berkshire to Indian parents, Rishi grew up in Walkergate, Newcastle upon Tyne where she attended Walkergate Primary and Junior School and Benfield School. She then studied for a business degree at the University of Bradford in 1998. After graduation she began working as a computer programmer, including for British Airways in Newcastle Business Park. During her spare time she discovered a passion for acting in Amateur Dramatics, and then, choosing to change professions, took a postgraduate course at the Mountview Academy of Theatre Arts.

== Career ==
Since graduation, Rishi has played PC Kapoor on ITV's The Last Detective, and is regular on the BBC radio soap Silver Street. In 2005 she guest-starred in the Doctor Who spin-off audio drama UNIT: The Longest Night and in 2007 appeared in the television episode Smith and Jones. In 2007 she toured, in the Pravesh Kumar comedy There's Something About Simmy. Rishi played Dona Marina (La Malinche) in BBC2's film "Cortes" which aired in March 2008. In late June and early July 2008, Rishi appeared in the BBC thriller Criminal Justice, playing lawyer Frances Kapoor who is assigned to fight for a murder suspect in court. In 2018, Rishi played DC Rakhee Shah in the British TV drama series Collateral.

Rishi joined the cast of Holby City as Lucky Simpson, a mental health nurse, in November 2020, during the drama's twenty-second series.

== Filmography ==
=== Film ===
Year	Title	Role	Notes
2006	Berry's Way	Meena	Television film
2012	Stud Life	Indian Bride	
2016	Murdered by My Father	Maheen	Television film
2017	Collateral	Rakhee Shah	Short film
2017	The Boy with the Topknot	Puli	Television film
2019	Hobbs & Shaw	Eteon Assistant	
2020	Earwigger	Sarah	Short film
2020	Corrina	Susan	Short film

=== Television ===
Year	Title	Role	Notes
2002	The Bill	Samina Ghundar	Recurring role; 2 episodes
2002	Doctors	Meena Patel	Episode: "Circle of Life"
2004	Lawless	Journalist	Miniseries
2004	The Bill	Nina Omar	Recurring role; 2 episodes
2005–07	The Last Detective	WPC Kapoor	Recurring role; 9 episodes
2006	Where the Heart Is	Registrar	Episode: "Don't Look Back in Anger"
2007	Doctor Who	Julia Swales	Episode: "Smith and Jones"
2007	Outnumbered	Kuj	Episode: "The Dinner Party"
2008	Heroes and Villains	Dona Marina	Episode: "Cortes"
2008	Criminal Justice	Frances Kapoor	Recurring role; 4 episodes
2011	Waking the Dead	DI Meenah Khan	Episode: "Waterloo: Part 2"
2012–13	Doctors	Dr. Jas Khella	Series regular; 172 episodes
2015–16	Boy Meets Girl	Anji	Series regular; 11 episodes
2017	Line of Duty	Rupal	Recurring role; 3 episodes
2017	Three Girls	Grace	Miniseries
2018	Collateral	DC Rakhee Shah	Miniseries
2019	Vera	Nita Dajani	Episode: "Cuckoo"
2019	Absentia	M.E. Sophia Ortiz	Episode: "Guilty"
2020	Van der Valk	Therese Remecker	Episode: "Love in Amsterdam"
2020	Shakespeare & Hathaway: Private Investigators	Parthi Raja	Episode: "A Serpent's Tooth"
2020–21	Holby City	Lucky Simpson	Series regular; 41 episodes
2021	Angela Black	Dr. Priya Gurinda	Episode: "Series 1, Episode 4"
2023	The Hunt for Raoul Moat	Nisha Roberts	Miniseries
2024	Bridgerton (Season 3)	Lady Malhotra	Recurring role

=== Video games ===
Year	Game	Role	Notes
2019	GreedFall	Aphra	Voice only
2023	Baldur's Gate 3	Cashguard Taslim / Fevrokis / Fist of Bane Gudrun	Voice only

== Theatre credits ==
Year	Title	Role	Venue	Notes
2001	The Tempest	Ariel	Tynemouth Priory, Tynemouth	
2003	Hobson's Choice	Sunita Hobson	Young Vic, London	
2004	Beasts and Beauties	Kari	Bristol Old Vic, Bristol	
2005	What We Did to Weinstein	Yasmin / Samira	Menier Chocolate Factory, London	
2007	There's Something About Simmy	Simmy	Theatre Royal Stratford East, London & UK Tour	
2007	Weights	Guapa	Blue Elephant Theatre, London	
2015	Who Cares	Lisa / Jack Davis	Royal Court Theatre, London	
2019	Alys, Always	Julia Price	Bridge Theatre, London	
