= No Angels (TV series) =

British television comedy drama series (2004–2006)

- Genre: Comedy drama
- Created by: Toby Whithouse
- Starring: Louise Delamere; James Frost; Jo Joyner; Charlotte Leach; Francis Magee; Derek Riddell; Sunetra Sarker; Kaye Wragg
- Country of origin: United Kingdom
- Original language: English
- No. of series: 3
- No. of episodes: 26

Production
- Running time: 45 minutes
- Production company: World Productions

Original release
- Network: Channel 4
- Release: 2 March 2004 – 11 April 2006

No Angels is a British comedy-drama television series, produced by the independent production company World Productions for Channel 4, which ran for three series from 2004 to 2006. It was devised by Toby Whithouse.

== Premise ==
The programme centres on the lives of three nurses and a healthcare assistant in the city of Leeds. The four main characters are Kate Oakley (played by Kaye Wragg), Lia Costoya (Louise Delamere), Anji Mittel (Sunetra Sarker), and Beth Nicholls (Jo Joyner). Additional main characters were played by Derek Riddell, James Frost, Francis Magee and Matt Bardock. The show deals with the women's lives both in and out of the hospital.

== Cast ==
- Louise Delamere as Lia Costoya – A nurse (and acting ward sister in Series One) at the hospital. She is a single mother; her daughter Emma lives with her father. Lia lives in hospital accommodation with Anji, Kate and Beth and attended college with Kate Oakley. The two subsequently became best friends. Lia has a sharp attitude and is often described as being a "great nurse, but a terrible mother." At the end of Series 3, Emma asks to move in with Lia and they begin to search for a flat. Shortly afterwards, Jamie, with whom Lia was in a relationship until he relocated to Australia, returns to Leeds and they get back together.
- Kaye Wragg as Katherine 'Kate' Oakley – A nurse and, later, ward sister at the hospital. Kate has several relationships throughout the programmes, including one with Dr Jamie Patterson. She later accepts Peter Compton's proposal in Series 3, but after he makes numerous attempts to control her, she eventually leaves him at the altar in the show's final episode. Kate went to an all-girls school and had a horse called Treacle and it is therefore assumed that she was relatively well off. However, she craves attention from her mother.
- Sunetra Sarker as Anji Mittel – A health care assistant (HCA) at the hospital. She is known for her numerous relationships and one night stands. In the first series, she is engaged (by an arranged marriage) to Adjesh, but he later rejects her after he falls in love. After declining a nursing course and being rejected by Callum, Anji decides to go travelling, returning in Series 3 heavily pregnant. She later gives birth to a baby girl and begins dating Callum after he declares his love for her. At Kate's wedding she decides to name her baby girl Mia. Anji is Beth's best friend. She has two sisters who are both married dentists, but she doesn't really get on with her family.
- Jo Joyner as Beverly Elizabeth 'Beth' Nicholls – A nurse at the hospital. She openly admits that she'd rather have money than love in the first series and begins an affair with one of the hospital's senior management. However, after he leaves his wife, Beth dumps him, admitting that she needs something more than "I will love you". She continues to date men for their money, but clearly doesn't like being treated like a "trophy wife". In the final series she begins dating a plumber (ironically as for 3 seasons she stated that she 'didn't do' plumbers). Beth, like Kate and Lia, has also slept with Jamie. Beth was raised by her aunt and it is implied that she left home for an unknown reason, although it is hinted in the same episode that she was molested/raped by her male cousin in the fourth episode of series one – something that by the end of the episode is suspected by her Aunt.
- Francis Magee as Mr. Leslie McManus – The senior consultant on the ward. He has a fierce temper.
- Derek Riddell as Dr. Jamie Patterson – McManus' golden boy. He has had both a short term relationship and a fling with Kate, and has slept with Beth. At the end of series three he reconciles with long term girlfriend Lia after his return from Australia, where he admits that he loves her.
- James Frost as Dr. Callum Parker – McManus' House Officer in the series. He is a reluctant doctor, having trained just to appease his parents. His true passion is golf, at which he is excellent – a passion he leaves medicine to pursue in series 2, but he later returns to the hospital. He is very shy and unassertive, something Anji tries to help him with, however it is revealed when he begins a relationship with physiotherapist Daisy that he is extremely sexually talented. In series 3 he declares his love for Anji, and they begin a relationship.
- Charlotte Leach as Emma – Lia's daughter. She lives with her father and step-mother, Sally. At the end of series 3 she asks to live with Lia, as she finds Sally too controlling and would prefer to be with her mum.
- Lynn Ferguson as Stella

== Episodes ==
=== Series overview ===
Series	Episodes	Originally released	
Series	Episodes	First released	Last released
1	10	2 March 2004	4 May 2004
2	8	15 March 2005	3 May 2005
3	8	28 February 2006	11 April 2006

=== Series 1 (2004) ===
Episode	Episode title	Transmission	Episode Description
1 (1-1)	Episode 1	2 March 2004	Divorcee Lia is acting sister and her friends Beth and the sensible Kate nurses at St Margaret's hospital, along with their promiscuous friend Anji, a health care assistant. However Kate resigns after senior house officer Jamie has blamed her for his mistake, resulting in a patient's death, and she has publicly punched him. Beth gets her own back on young house officer Callum by putting a sedative in his drink when he is on call and Lia's daughter, who lives with her father, berates her for preferring the nurses' company to visiting her. Anji has a one night stand but tells the man in question she is terminally ill to avoid future dates.
2 (1-2)	Episode 2	9 March 2004	Subject to an upcoming arranged marriage Anji feels guilty that her future husband is keeping himself celibate for her and befriends a psychiatrist who has not had sex in years but, being Anji, such things do not last. With Kate gone Carl Jenkins is senior nurse on the ward and soon finds himself on the losing end of a series of practical jokes with the nurses. When he gets grabbed by an obese patient he files a complaint of sexual harassment, which blows his chances with Lia. Kate agrees to return if she is appointed staff nurse.
3 (1-3)	Episode 3	16 March 2004	Lia is alarmed to learn that her ex-husband Al and his new partner Sally are planning to move away with Emma and after she promises to see her daughter more the move is cancelled. When the wrong kidney is taken out of a patient Anji tumbles to the truth but Jamie tries to take the credit. As a result the patient is persuaded not to sue but Beth ends up a hundred pounds better off . Callum also makes a mistake whilst Kate, attending an anger management course, makes it clear she will never allow anybody to walk over her again.
4 (1-4)	Episode 4	23 March 2004	Beth goes after Paul, a wealthy and handsome medic who is being headhunted for a management post but there is one snag – he is married. Beth's aunt Pat is admitted to her ward with a foot infection and Beth goes out of her way to avoid her, the animosity between the two women being explained when Beth's cousin Kelvin turns up. Senior consultant McManus takes Callum under his wing, betting that he will beat a rival consultant's protégé at golf but too much concentration on the tournament leads to Callum making more mistakes on the ward. Kate meanwhile decides to give herself a glamorous make-over.
5 (1-5)	Episode 5	30 March 2004	The nurses feel sorry for new registrar Jane Salter, rumoured to be a Lesbian and thus on the receiving end of flak from male colleagues. Anji tries to offer her advice but when she is given the chance to train as a nurse and Jane tells her it was probably only down to an equal opportunities policy Anji feels betrayed and the nurses stitch Jane up at her welcome party. Kate befriends Ray, a morgue attendant with a strange sense of humour, whilst Beth is declared a local hero after diagnosing a patient with a heart condition as having Munchhausen's. However, when the patient is readmitted after drinking fabric conditioner, opinions of Beth change. Anji decides against taking up nursing training after Callum tells her he only became a doctor to please his father.
6 (1-6)	Episode 6	6 April 2004	Paul is back as clinical services manager though his efforts to make life easier for the nurses only result in more red tape. Sensing that she will never catch him Beth takes Jamie to bed as second best. Jamie is fed up with Callum being McManus's golden boy because of his golfing skills and lets him know it so Lia encourages the younger man to be more assertive. Unfortunately this leads to his accidentally over-dosing a dying cancer patient and being disciplined. Kate, finding Ray too persistent, finishes with him by telling him she is allergic to his sperm whilst Anji writes a sexy article, despite a failed attempt at a threesome.
7 (1-7)	Episode 7	13 April 2004	A new registrar Willem, a Dutchman, insists on taking a holistic approach to patients which temporarily seduces Kate but is exposed as pointless when the patients need medication and not housing questionnaires. Jamie, out of his head on coke, makes unwise comments about a research grant which leads to McManus cancelling it. Beth gets carried away in discharging patients too early in what Kate suspects is an effort to impress Paul. Beth also mistakenly believes that Paul is about to set her up in her own flat and puts it about the ward. However, as compensation, she does get sex out of him.
8 (1-8)	Episode 8	20 April 2004	Anji is told by her prospective husband Ajesh that their arranged marriage is off. at first she assumes he is gay but he tells her he has been having an affair with another woman for over a year. This is something of a wake-up call for Anji, who determines to be more sensible in future. She confides in Callum, who in turn tells her he is taking a sabbatical to see if he really wants to be a doctor. The nurses attend a meeting on money management, at which they are very poor, but assess priorities when comforting a woman whose mother died just before she was due to go on the holiday of a life-time. Kate is confused over her relationship with Jamie, in the light of his one night stand with Beth.
9 (1-9)	Episode 9	27 April 2004	Not having had sex since New Year's Eve 1999 Lia is keen to get back in the habit with patient's son Conor but her rampant enthusiasm puts him off. Next day he learns she has been lying about her sex life but is happy to start again. Things go well but sadly he is soon to fly off for a job abroad. However Lia is sufficiently empowered to stand up to McManus though shocked that Emma has a boyfriend. Jamie takes Kate to a posh soiree and overreacts when he learns that she attended a private school, accusing her of pretentions whilst Anji's attempts to implement a new ward policy of friendliness lead to a complaint against her.
10 (1-10)	Episode 10	4 May 2004	After Paul tears strips off McManus he is forced to choose between his wife and Beth to keep his job. He chooses Beth and they set up house together. Callum returns from his sabbatical and takes Beth's room. Encouraged by Anji he dates a nurse called Daisy and brings her back for sex. Kate goes up against the annoying Clare to be the new ward sister and though Kate has popular support at a training session Clare gets the job as she is considered more cost effective. Beth finds living with Paul very different from being his mistress and they argue, Beth returning home to find Callum and Daisy have taken her bed.

=== Series 2 (2005) ===
Episode	Episode title	Transmission	Episode Description
11 (2-1)	Episode 1	15 March 2005	Whilst Kate and Clare become friends Beth is still after a rich husband to take Paul's place and sets her sights on Joe, son of a wealthy patient who has his own trust fund. However she is approached by a friend from the past, Sean, who gets her to steal drugs for him. When Jamie catches her and threatens to report her Lia saves the day with a spot of blackmail. Anji finds herself falling for Callum, who somewhat unwisely tells her he loves both her and Daisy. By the time he realises that Anji is the one for him he finds her having sex on the rebound in a cupboard with Dr. Vincent.
12 (2-2)	Episode 2	22 March 2005	The friendship between Kate and Clare falls apart as Kate gets picked on by the sister. Anji drowns her sorrows at not being able to have Callum whilst Beth nurses a man who has tried to crucify himself and calls her Mary. He gets ecstatic every time she dresses his nail wounds though ultimately she discovers that he is likening her to Mary Magdalene and not the Virgin Mary. Lia enters a creative writing contest with an account of her severe post-natal depression following the birth of Emma. Her story is well-received and she considers leaving nursing to become a full-time writer but reverses her decision after Emma reads her story and is angry that she is thinking of leaving her again.
13 (2-3)	Episode 3	29 March 2005	Anji persuades the others to go speed dating with her. She thinks she has done well when she meets Alex but his failure to contact her leads to her having casual sex with the porters whilst Beth's date Nigel turns out to have a daughter he has conveniently failed to mention. When the ward is hit by an outbreak of MRSA Kate is put in charge of infection control. The culprit turns out to be Clare, who is forced to resign, thus allowing Kate to take her place as ward sister.
14 (2-4)	Episode 4	5 April 2005	Kate starts dating handsome patient Robert Miller. However, as his condition starts to worsen, she begins to see the folly of her decision as she feels compromised. Beth is annoyed when Jamie resorts to crawling in order to become registrar and determines to take him down a peg or two whilst Lia, in an effort to prove to Emma that she is a responsible parent, looks after her pet rabbit. Anji meanwhile befriends a PhD student convinced she is having a breakdown and learns a little psychology in the process.
15 (2-5)	Episode 5	12 April 2005	The trust is looking for a nurse to star in their new recruitment campaign. Beth does not share the others' enthusiasm that Kate should be put forward but changes her attitude when she is chosen instead. Anji fails to see why the others have signed up for cable TV when they would be better off clubbing whilst student nurse Simone seeks Beth's advice in attracting a doctor she fancies. However, when the doctor turns out to be Jamie, who is crowing about pulling sixteen-year-old Simone, Beth punches him – in front of the campaign cameras, thus ending her reign.
16 (2-6)	Episode 6	19 April 2005	Lia agrees to pose as Jamie's fiancée to impress senior consultant Mr. Asquith at the annual hospital ball and increase his chances of being made registrar. Mr Asquith is indeed impressed but Lia herself ends up having a quickie with Marcus, a medical supplies rep, who is keen to see her again. Kate is rushed to casualty and she and her friends find it a bizarre experience to have to nurse one of their own.
17 (2-7)	Episode 7	26 April 2005	The others are less than pleased when Anji's cousin Sujata rings her, saying she needs a place to stay after rowing with her parents though her stay is ended when Anji's aunt explains what really happened. Kate is accepted on a medical practitioner course, which will give her more power on the ward, whilst Beth dates new registrar Dr. Tim but is put off by his odd behaviour. Lia accompanies Jamie to another function and, at Emma's request, Marcus, who is clearly in love with Lia, acts as baby-sitter.
18 (2-8)	Episode 8	3 May 2005	Jamie is made registrar at last and, at the celebration, Kate gets drunk on cheap champagne and makes a fool of herself in front of Dr. Templar, who suggests she attends Alcoholics Anonymous. A new agency nurse, the handsome Justyn, arrives and after initially getting off on the wrong foot Beth goes on a date with him and, although he is allegedly gay, wonders how she ended up in bed with him. Lia realises that she is more in love with Jamie than Marcus, whom she has to let down gently whilst Callum is convinced that the ragged looking man following Anji is a stalker and tells him where to go.

=== Series 3 (2006) ===
Episode	Episode title	Transmission	Episode Description
19 (3-1)	Episode 1	28 February 2006	Kate finds herself on a nurse practitioner course and before long she soon has ideas on how to improve the ward which irritates all the others. Beth plots revenge after thinking Justin tricked her into bed. Elsewhere, Jamie and Lia's relationship is stronger than ever. Finally, after a big night out with an old crush & former art teacher, Anji turns up late for work. How will Kate, the new nurse practitioner, handle this situation?
20 (3-2)	Episode 2	28 February 2006	After her spat with Kate Anji quits her job and decides to travel around India. With Anji gone Beth is concerned that Lia and Kate only befriended her because Anji was the link and is put out when they go drinking without her, leading to a row which causes her to go and work in a private hospital. Callum becomes jealous of Justyn's popularity on the ward and gets him to school him in the ways of acting more camply.
21 (3-3)	Episode 3	7 March 2006	Peter Compton, an ex-Army doctor arrives to take Jamie's place and has a baptism of fire when a whole lot of guests at a wedding reception are admitted with food poisoning. He rows with Kate over McManus's treatment of the nurses but she accepts when he asks her on a date. Lia however is upset because Jamie is going to work in Australia and she does not think it fair to Emma to go with him. Callum is making money from being a guinea pig for a clinical drug trial, prompting Beth and Justyn to follow suit but he knows something they do not, which is why they suffer adverse effects and he feels on top of the world.
22 (3-4)	Episode 4	14 March 2006	Beth is reunited with Kate and Lia whilst Peter uses his army skills to give self-defence classes to the rest of the staff after they are subject to assaults from violent patients. He continues dating Kate though their lack of sex draws comments from the others. it is Kate's thirtieth birthday and Valerie, her mother, turns up for her surprise party. However Valerie is out to hog the limelight, getting drunk with the nurses and showing off her breast implants and Lia and Beth come to see why there is little affection between mother and daughter.
23 (3-5)	Episode 5	28 March 2006	Beth decides to teach the obnoxious and jealous Steph a lesson with a practical joke that involves super gluing herself to Steph's fiancé Patrick. Anji new-found spirituality comes to an abrupt end when she realises the reality of the situation with her unborn baby. She makes plans for her baby including finding the potential father. Kate and Peter exchange presents but she is upset when she thinks that he may have exchanged his and a scornful Lia and Emma attend a craft evenings for single-parents and their children.
24 (3-6)	Episode 6	4 April 2006	Anji plans to go on a camping trip with her friend Rob but another loony mum-to-be puts her off the idea, so Beth goes instead. Beth sets her sights on a plastic surgeon but is disappointed by the outcome of their date. Kate thinks that Peter is going to 'pop the question' but his reaction to her excitement disappoints her. Later, he turns things around and surprises her by proposing to her at a garden centre.
25 (3-7)	Episode 7	4 April 2006	Kate and Peter are officially engaged but whilst she is planning for a lavish wedding he fails to see the need for such fuss. Lia begins dating the much younger Jake, which, in turn, leads to her behaving like a teenager though this does have its advantages when she is asked to give a lecture on sex education at Emma's school. Beth agrees to go on a second date with plumber Rob whilst Anji is in a dilemma when both Beth and Callum offer to be her birthing partner and she does not want to disappoint either.
26 (3-8)	Episode 8	11 April 2006	To her surprise Beth finds Rob more satisfying than the wealthy husband she thought she always craved whilst Anji, having given birth to baby Mia, is at long last paired off with Callum despite their recent difficult patch. Emma suggests to Lia that they might go to Australia to be with Jamie but there is no need when the registrar returns, declaring his feelings for Lia and moving in with her and Emma. Kate on the other hand is beginning to find Peter is not the man she thought as he becomes more and more controlling and in the end, she eventually leaves him at the altar.

== Decommission ==
On 19 August 2005, Channel 4 announced that the show was to end after a third and final series. Newly appointed drama commissioner at the station Francis Hopkinson decided to cancel the show after the eight episodes of Series 3 had aired. He stated "All the characters have moved on..I didn't like the idea of starting again with new characters so we're ending it while it's on top." Channel 4 said that by ending the series they were able to focus more on issue-based dramas.

== Filming ==
The filming for all three series of the show took place mainly at the disused High Royds Hospital site in nearby Menston. Most other filming took place in Leeds city centre and Bradford.
