= Charlie Condou =

British actor (born 1973)

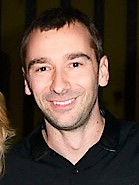
- Condou in 2014
- Born: Charles Lomax David Condou; 8 January 1973 (age 53); Hammersmith, London, England
- Occupations: Actor, writer
- Years active: 1985–present
- Television: Nathan Barley; Coronation Street
- Spouse: Cameron Laux (m. 2015)
- Children: 2

Charlie Condou (born 8 January 1973) is a British actor, columnist and LGBT rights activist. Condou secured a series of television movie roles during his teenage years in the 1980s. He later had guest roles in British television series during the 1990s. In 2007, Condou gained wider recognition when he took the role of sonographer Marcus Dent in the soap opera Coronation Street, in which he remained until 2014. He also played the role of Ben Sherwood in the medical drama Holby City from 2019 to 2020. Condou has used his fame as a platform to promote LGBT rights, becoming a patron for charities and being an advocate for same-sex parenting.

== Career ==
Condou's acting career began in the 1985 American television movie The Key to Rebecca as Billy Vandam, the young son of the main character, William, played by Cliff Robertson. He then appeared in the 1985 movie Exploits at West Poley at the age of twelve. His television career continued throughout his teens with appearances in the shows Robin of Sherwood and A Sense of Guilt. In 1988, Condou appeared in the television movie Every Breath You Take as a thirteen-year-old chorister. He worked with actress Connie Booth, who played his on-screen mother in the movie. He went onto secure the role of Stuart Wolvis in the six-part British comedy drama series The Wolvis Family. The show focuses on the Wolvis family's issues, with Stuart being the problematic teenager of the family. He continued in his twenties, playing a variety of roles in series like Martin Chuzzlewit, Pie in the Sky, The Bill, Peak Practice, Urban Gothic, The Infinite Worlds of H. G. Wells and Midsomer Murders. Other roles included a guest appearances as Nino in television series Gimme, Gimme, Gimme alongside Kathy Burke, and Giles in the film Dead Babies. He then played the role of Auguste in the 2001 thriller film Charlotte Gray alongside Cate Blanchett.

In 2005, the actor played editor Jonatton Yeah? in Channel 4 sitcom Nathan Barley. In 2006, Condou appeared as Renoir in the BBC drama The Impressionists. He had a cameo role as an elf in the film Fred Claus. In 2007, Condou joined the cast of the British soap opera Coronation Street, playing Marcus Dent. In 2008 he left the show and stated that "I have had a fantastic time in Coronation Street, but as a jobbing actor I believe it is time to move on." A publicist from the show added "we'll be sad to see Charlie leave." At the time, Condou indicated that "there are a few things in the pipeline, one of which is a feature film which is being made abroad. But all that's under wraps at the moment." This film turned out to be Good, released later that year.

After having returned as Marcus in 2011, it was announced in 2013 that Condou would be leaving Coronation Street the following year. In September 2014, he took the lead role of Adam in the West End production of Next Fall. From September to December 2016, he took part in the UK tour of The Rocky Horror Show. In February 2017, Condou played Reverend Hale in the UK tour of Arthur Miller's play The Crucible. That year, he was cast in the role of Simon Osborne in the second series of the ITV drama Unforgotten.

In 2019, Condou joined the cast of Holby City in a guest role, playing doctor Ben Sherwood.

In September 2024, it was announced that Condou had been cast in Doctor Who. He appeared in "The Interstellar Song Contest" as Gary Gabbastone, an engineer, in May 2025. In 2026, Condou appeared as Curtis Baxter in the Russell T Davies-penned television series Tip Toe, broadcast on Channel 4.

== Personal life ==
Condou is openly gay and he married his long-term Canadian boyfriend Cameron Laux on 8 June 2015. He lives in Islington with his husband and his children, Georgia and Hal, who split their time between him and their mother, the actress Catherine Kanter. Condou and Kanter first met in 1998 and made a mutual agreement that they would have a child if she was still single at the age of 40. In a number of interviews, Condou has revealed that the children were conceived through IVF treatment, following Kanter's fortieth birthday and relationship breakup. From October 2011 until July 2012, he wrote a column for The Guardian newspaper on the subject of same-sex parenting.

Condou supported the UK remaining a member of the European Union in the 2016 EU referendum.

== Activism ==
Condou has been listed on various LGBT influence lists and polls during his career. He was listed at number fifteen in the World Pride Power List 2012 and rose to number eleven on the 2013 list. Additionally, he was placed eighth on The Independent's Pink Power list 2011 and forty-second on the Pride Power List of 2011. He is a patron of the charities Diversity Role Models and the akt, and has volunteered for the Terrence Higgins Trust. Condou has also worked with Stonewall on fundraisers. In October 2012, he was named in the British gay publication Attitude as the magazine's "Man of the Year" at the inaugural Attitude awards and appeared on the cover of the November 2012 issue. In 2014 he was nominated for the "Advocate for change" award at the GLAAD awards in Los Angeles.

Condou has also been an advocate for LGBT families. In 2013, he set up the company, Out With the Family, which puts on events for LGBT families. In 2016, Condou wrote the introduction for Eric Rosswood's Journey to Same-Sex Parenthood: Firsthand Advice, Tips and Stories from Lesbian and Gay Couples. In December 2019, Condou spoke at a seminar focusing on "non-traditional families".

In August 2014, Condou was one of 200 public figures who were signatories to a letter to The Guardian opposing Scottish independence in the run-up to September's referendum on that issue.

== Filmography ==
Year	Title	Role	Notes
1985	The Key to Rebecca	Billy Vandam	TV movie
1985	Exploits at West Poley	Leonard	TV movie
1986	Robin of Sherwood	Martin	Guest role
1988	Every Breath You Take	Tom	TV movie
1988	The Storyteller	Brother 2	Guest role
1988	To Kill a Priest	Mirek	Film
1991	A Sense of Guilt	Peter Murray	Recurring role
1991	Casualty	David Williamson	Guest role
1991	The Wolvis Family	Stuart Wolvis	Regular role
1992	Eldorado	Clive Mitchell	Guest role
1993	Frank Stubbs Promotes	Jason Stubbs	Guest role
1994	Martin Chuzzlewit	Footman	Guest role
1994	The Bill	Michael Kenyon	Guest role
1995	Casualty	Cal McGregor	Guest role
1995	Pie in the Sky	Karl Elves	Guest role
1995	The Bill	Steve Downing	Guest role
1999	Gimme Gimme Gimme	Nino	Guest role
1999	Peak Practice	Private Benedict Grinter	Guest role
1999	Honky Sausages	O.G.	Guest role
2000	Urban Gothic	Lenny	Guest role
2000	Dead Babies	Giles	Film
2001	The Infinite Worlds of H. G. Wells	Sam	Guest role
2001	Charlotte Gray	Auguste	Film
2003	Trust	Max	Guest role
2005	Midsomer Murders	Jake Foley	Guest role
2005	Nathan Barley	Jonatton Yeah?	Regular role
2005	Secret Smile	Lawrence	Guest role
2006	The Impressionists	Renoir	Recurring role
2007	Flirting with Flamenco	Warren	Film
2007	Fred Claus	Elf	Film
2007	Holby City	Tony Butler	Guest role
2007–2008, 2011–2014	Coronation Street	Marcus Dent	Regular role
2008	Good	Bekemeier	Film
2009	Casualty	Gal	Guest role
2015	Time Crashers	Self	Regular role
2016	You, Me and the Apocalypse	Father Alphonse	Film
2017	Unforgotten	Simon Osborne	Regular role
2019−2020	Holby City	Ben Sherwood	Recurring role
2023	Midsomer Murders	Perry Fleming	Guest role
2025	The Madame Blanc Mysteries	Pierre	Guest role
2025	Doctor Who	Gary Gabbastone	Guest role
2026	Tip Toe	Curtis Baxter	Guest role
2026	Agatha Christie's Tommy & Tuppence	Albert	Regular role
