= Sacha Levy =

- Holby City character
- Bob Barrett as Sacha Levy
- First appearance: "Talk to Me"; 5 January 2010
- Last appearance: "Episode 1102"; 29 March 2022
- Portrayed by: Bob Barrett
- Spinoff(s): Casualty (2019, 2023)

In-universe information
- Occupation: Consultant general surgeon, Clinical lead (Keller); (prev. Clinical Skills tutor, specialist registrar, locum register)
- Family: Esther Levy (mother)
- Spouse: Chrissie Williams (2012–2014)
- Significant other: Essie Di Lucca
- Children: Rachel Levy; Beka Levy; Daniel Levy-Williams
- Relatives: Maria Edelman (great-aunt)

Sacha Levy is a fictional character from the BBC One medical drama Holby City, played by Bob Barrett. He made his first appearance in the twelfth series episode "Talk to Me", broadcast on 5 January 2010. Sacha joined the Keller ward staff as a specialist registrar in general surgery. Sacha is the father of long-serving character Chrissie Williams's infant son, Daniel, as a result of a one-night stand, and has since held unreciprocated feelings for her. Since Chrissie's departure in 2013, Sacha's storylines have seen a relationship with Essie Harrison (Kaye Wragg) and a battle with depression. Barrett has reprised the role of Sacha in sister show Casualty in 2019 and 2023.

== Storylines ==
Sacha has a one-night stand with Chrissie Williams (Tina Hobley). He then appears briefly in a locum registrar capacity, before, much to Chrissie's surprise, returning several months later on a six-month contract as a locum registrar on the hospital's general surgical ward, Keller, working alongside permanent registrar Jac Naylor (Rosie Marcel) and under consultant general surgeons Ric Griffin (Hugh Quarshie) and Michael Spence (Hari Dhillon). Sacha's post later became permanent, though he transferred to head up the hospital's Acute Assessment Unit (AAU) by director of surgery Henrik Hanssen (Guy Henry), after clinical lead Michael Spence became engaged working on the plastic surgery unit on Darwin ward with Sunil Bhatti.

Sacha continues to work on AAU alongside Chrissie, and he tries to win her over several times. Despite this, she enters into a relationship with Dan Hamilton (Adam Astill), and they become engaged to be married. However, when Dan is revealed to be gay, Chrissie becomes closer to Sacha and realizes that he is the man for her as he is so nice. She then goes on holiday to Australia with him, and they later become engaged as well. When Sacha is stabbed by an unstable patient, Chrissie and Michael just manage to save him, despite a lot of blood loss, and it later causes conflict between Chrissie and student doctor Ella Henderson, who left Sacha to bleed out of fear. However, Sacha convinces Chrissie to lay easy on her. They marry, despite Chrissie's original concerns, and return to work on AAU. Sacha tries to help fellow doctor Luc Hemmingway (Joseph Millson), who is having problems and invites him for a turbulent Christmas dinner. Luc soon departs Holby after receiving advice from Sacha. Sacha befriends new doctor Gemma Wilde (Ty Glaser).

After a family holiday, Sacha's daughter Rachel is taken ill, and he is devastated to learn she has leukemia. As her treatment begins, he shaves his head to show support to her. When he learns that Daniel is a bone marrow match and is potentially the only one that can save Rachel's life, he authorizes the procedure without Chrissie's permission, creating problems between them. After a rocky few months, Chrissie takes Daniel and visits her father in Australia. When she returns, he learns through Daniel's nursery that she is back and suspects Chrissie of having an affair with Michael. However, it conspires she has breast cancer, which devastates Sacha. He later moves back in with Chrissie to support Daniel, but their separation continues.

== Development ==
=== Casting and characterisation ===
A lovable bear of a man, Sacha Levy's capacity to enjoy life is equaled only by his compassion, he works to live and lives to help people, not to climb the greasy pole. But don't let the laid back jocular exterior fool you! Underneath this larger-than-life facade beats a lion's heart, deftly protecting all that he holds dear.

— An excerpt from Sacha's profile on the official Holby City website.

To compensate for the departing characters, several new characters joined the show during the course of the twelfth series. After appearing briefly as Chrissie's one-night stand, Bob Barrett became a main cast member playing Locum General surgical registrar Sacha Levy at Holby City Hospital.

Barrett was initially contracted for eight months as part of the main cast. In May 2012, Barrett stated "I love it here and that's always been the case – since day one, I've had a ball. I love the cast, the crew and the people who run the show - it's a great team. I love being part of a programme that people hold dearly – and I feel the responsibility of that, too. He told Daniel Kilkelly of Digital Spy that he wanted to remain a part of the cast as long as his character had "a journey".

=== Depression ===
Sacha has been the focus of a story which raises awareness of male depression and it was scripted over an entire year. In April 2017, episodes featured Sacha behaving out of character and Essie Harrison (Kaye Wragg) worries about his mental health. The story begins when Sacha does not style his hair for work and wears dirty clothing. His usual caring bedside manner changed and he becomes irritated with a patient. He also tries to steal wine from a bar which prompts Essie to believe he has developed depression. Sacha breaks down in tears and reveals that he has been stealing to make himself feel better. Sacha gets his depression treated and gradually regains control. In July 2018, his behavior starts to cause concern again. First Sacha ends experimental research he had invested his own money into. Then his daughter cancels plans to go on holiday. He then develops feelings for his friend Patricia Ghraoui (Sirine Saba). After he operates on her hernia, Sacha asks her to date him but Patricia refuses. This puts Sacha in a bad mood and he tells hospital porter Jason Haynes (Jules Robertson) that being a parent will eventually make him feel pointless. Following Sacha's mood swings viewers began to speculate that Sacha would try to commit suicide.

On 10 August 2018, a special episode of Holby City focusing on Sacha's mental health was announced. It was revealed that during the episode the character would become emotionally unstable and attempt suicide from the hospital roof. The episode includes old scenes which are played out with a new perspective revealing insight into Sacha's depressive thoughts. Michelle Lipton wrote the episode which aims to raise awareness of male mental health and the way it affects men who chose to ignore symptoms so they are not perceived as weak. The show's executive producer Simon Harper said that the episode was "incredibly important" and focused on "one troubled year in the life of one beloved, vulnerable character." Series producer Kate Hall described Barrett's performance as "absolutely heartbreaking". Holby City worked alongside the British mental health charity Mind, their advice service helped the show create a really dramatic depiction of male depression. Jenni Regan from Mind said that "using such a well-loved and popular character" had the potential to change negative attitudes towards mental health.

Producers later hired the actor's daughter Francesca Barrett to play his on-screen daughter Beka Levy. She is reintroduced into the series to help Sacha deal with his depression. By December 2018, Sacha still had not told Beka about his condition. Barrett told Laura-Jayne Tyler from Inside Soap that his character was dealing with depression the best he could but finds it tough at different times. Sacha had unresolved issues with Beka that dated back to the day he attempted suicide. He had never sorted through their differences following the angry voice mail he had left her. After advice from Henrik Hanssen (Guy Henry), Sacha reconnects with Beka and tells her the truth about his depression. Barrett added that by the end of the conversation both characters are in "floods of tears". He also enjoyed the opportunity to work on the story with his actual daughter because they have a strong relationship, which he believed could be seen on-screen.

=== Other appearances ===
Alongside his appearances in Holby City, Barrett has played Sacha in the show's sister serial Casualty. Producers of the two shows created a crossover special, "CasualtyXHolby", which spans over an episode of each show. Sacha takes a prominent role in the crossover when he is involved in a car accident with Beka, resulting in characters from Casualty having to save them. Barrett explained that although Beka receives the immediate help, Sacha actually has a more severe injury; he later collapses and requires surgery. Barrett filmed with Casualty at the Roath Lock Studios in Cardiff for two weeks and enjoyed being involved in a big stunt, since they were infrequently seen on Holby City. The special was originally broadcast in March 2019.

Holby City was cancelled in June 2021 after 23 years on air and the finale aired in March 2022. Barrett suggested that characters could appear in Casualty following the end of series. In October 2022, actor Jason Durr, who portrays David Hide in Casualty, posted an image of him and Barrett to his social media. This sparked rumours that Barrett could appear in Casualty, which the BBC confirmed to Stefania Sarrubba of Digital Spy. The character appears in the series 37 episode "The Straw", originally broadcast on 18 March 2023. Sacha's appearance was devised as part of the exit of established character Robyn Miller (Amanda Henderson). When Robyn is admitted following a car crash, Sacha visits the ED to operate on her, but she dies in theatre.

== Reception ==
A reporter from the Evening Chronicle branded him "the permanently disorganised Sacha". A writer of the Teesside Gazette said that they would never consider Sacha as a "dark horse" type of character. A Daily Mirror critic jested "Bumbling doctor Sacha has never been lucky in love himself, so it's no surprise that he thinks the worst when he sees Essie becoming friendly with a colleague." A What's on TV reporter said "Sacha Levy has always been Holby’s Mr Happy-Go-Lucky" and "Sacha Levy is always the one Holby City consultant people can rely."

Sue Haasler writing for Metro, praised Barrett's performance during his depression storyline. She opined that "Bob Barrett is a naturally smiley actor, but I loved how for most of the episode he somehow managed to keep the customary twinkle out of his eyes – we could see that Sacha was putting on a brave face and wasn't really happy." Haasler enjoyed Sacha's 2023 appearance in Casualty and dubbed him "glorious". Her colleague Calli Kitson labelled the character an "icon" and looking forward to his return, opining that "all is right in the world again".
