= Kaye Wragg =

English actress (born 1972)

- Born: Kaye Michelle Wragg; 15 December 1972 (age 53); Stockport, Cheshire, England
- Other name: Kaye Darling
- Occupation: Actress
- Years active: 1996–present
- Spouse: Jamie Darling (m. 2007)
- Children: 2
- Website: unitedagents.co.uk/kaye-wragg

Kaye Michelle Wragg (born 15 December 1972) is an English actress best known for her television roles as Sergeant Diane Noble in The Bill, Kate Oakley in No Angels, Essie Harrison (now known as Essie di Lucca) in Holby City from 2014 to 2020, and Lucy Archer in The Lakes. She studied at the University of Salford.

== Career ==
Born in Stockport, Cheshire, Wragg played one of Nick Harper's girlfriends, a police officer, in the BBC One situation comedy My Family, as well as Lindsey, a supporting role in Peter Kosminsky's 2002 television film The Project.

She played nurse Essie di Lucca in Holby City whose first appearance was on 6 May 2014, making her final appearance in Episode 1033, broadcast on 11 August 2020, as a conclusion of the character's terminal cancer storyline. She also played Gina in ITV's Panto! for the one Christmas special episode. In 2014, she guest starred in the first two episodes of series 17 of Silent Witness. Wragg also had a main role in the Channel 4 hospital comedy No Angels.

In 2015, Wragg appeared as Izzy Cartwright in the BBC TV series Death in Paradise (Series 4, Episode 7).

== Personal life ==
Having been together for 14 years, Wragg married Jamie Darling at Tatton Park, Cheshire, on 17 November 2007. They have two daughters, Matilda and Mollie.

== Filmography ==
=== Film ===
Year	Title	Role	Notes
2011	Wings	Karen	Short film

=== Television ===
Year	Title	Role	Notes
1996	Lyddie	Anne Ridley	Television film
1996	Prime Suspect 5: Errors of Judgement	Intelligence Officer	Mini-series; Episode 2: "Part 2"
1997	Coronation Street	Melanie	1 episode
1997	Born to Run	Nimmy	Episodes 1–6
1998	Slap! - Love, Lies and Lipstick	Sheryl	Series 1; Episode 2
1998	Anorak of Fire	Jacqui Gascoigne	Television film
1998	Where the Heart Is	Vicki	Series 2; Episode 9: "She Goes On"
1997, 1999	The Lakes	Lucy Archer	Series 1 & 2; 14 episodes
1999	Dalziel and Pascoe	Elizabeth Wulfstan	Series 4; Episode 1: "On Beulah Height"
2000	The Bill	P.C. Beckett	Series 16; Episode 27: "Over the Edge"
2000	Blind Ambition	Rona Anderson	Television film
2000	Harry Enfield's Brand Spanking New Show	Various characters	4 episodes
2000	The Sins	Hope Green	Mini-series; 6 episodes
2001	In a Land of Plenty	Laura	Mini-series; 9 episodes
2001	Merseybeat	Dee Milton	Episode 1: "Deep End"
2001	Table 12	Louise	Episode 3: "Aphrodisiac"
2001	Back Home	Ivy	Television film
2001	My Family	Stephanie	Series 2; Episode 11: "The Last Supper"
2002	Holby City	Adele Masters	Series 4; Episode 26: "Birthday"
2002	The Project	Lindsey	2-part television film
2002, 2005	Wire in the Blood	Penny Burgess	3 episodes: "The Mermaids Singing: Parts 1 & 2" and "Syncronicity"
2003	The Bill	Donna Wilder	Series 19; Episode 14: "False Pride"
2003	Unconditional Love	D.S. Hayley Greene	Television film
2003	Real Crime	Jane Andrews	Series 3; Episode 3: "Lady Jane"
2004	The Afternoon Play	Julie Singleton	Series 2; Episode 3: "Drive"
2004	The Long Firm	Karen	Mini-series; Episode 4: "Lennie's Story"
2004	A Thing Called Love	Melanie Callaghan	Episode 1: "True Confession"
2004–2006	No Angels	Katherine 'Kate' Oakley	Main role. Series 1–3; 26 episodes
2005	Walk Away and I Stumble	Lou Lou	Television film
2006–2009	The Bill	P.C./Sgt. Diane Noble	Regular role. Series 22–25; 61 episodes
2010	Holby City	Joanne Caffrey	Series 12; Episode 15: "Stop All the Clocks"
2010	Waterloo Road	Hannah Kirby	Series 6; Episode 1
2011	Casualty	Maureen Firth	Series 25; Episode 45: "System Error"
2011	Inspector George Gently	Jasmine	Series 4; Episode 1: "Gently Upside Down"
2012	Secrets and Words	Jackie Jones	Episode 5: "Mightier Than the Sword"
2012	Vera	Connie	Series 2; Episode 2: "Silent Voices"
2012	Silk	Jamie Slotover	Series 2; Episodes 3 & 6: "In the Family Way" and "Shooting Blanks: Part 2"
2012	Panto!	Gina	Television film
2012–2014	Young Dracula	Elizabeta	Series 4; Episodes 12 & 13, and Series 5; Episode 7
2013	Call the Midwife	Rita Bailey	Series 2; Episode 7
2013	Frankie	Kelly Fortune	Episode 3
2014	Silent Witness	D.S. Anne Burchett	Series 17; Episodes 1 & 2: "Commodity: Parts 1 & 2"
2014	The Driver	Melinda	Mini-series; Episode 3
2014–2022	Holby City	Estelle 'Essie' Harrison/Di Lucca	Regular role. Series 16-23; 219 episodes
2015	Death in Paradise	Izzy Cartwright	Series 4; Episode 7: "She Was Murdered Twice"
2015	No Offence	Alison Carey	Series 1; Episode 4
2019	Casualty	Essie Di Lucca	Series 33; Episode 26
2023	Father Brown	Miss Noele Schama	Series 10; Episode 3: "The Gardeners of Eden"
2024	Silent Witness	Valerie Fullerton	Series 27; Episodes 3 & 4: "Grievance Culture: Parts 1 & 2"
2024	Ellis	Linda Bradley	Episode 1: "Hanmore"
