= Bob Barrett (actor) =

English actor (born 1966)

- Born: Robert Barrett; 31 March 1966 (age 60); England
- Education: Guildhall School of Music and Drama
- Occupation: Actor
- Years active: 1991 – present
- Spouse: Rebecca Charles
- Children: 2

Robert Barrett (born 31 March 1966) is an English actor. He is best known for his role as Sacha Levy in the BBC One medical drama Holby City.

== Career ==
Barrett was educated at Bedford School, where he was a boarder. He then trained at the Guildhall School of Music and Drama in London. In 2010, he joined the main cast of the long running BBC One medical drama Holby City, playing Sacha Levy. He remained until the show's final episode in 2022, recently reprising the role in a 2023 episode of sister series Casualty.

His extensive stage career began in 1991, and he has more than thirty credits to his name in the West End and around the UK. In 2008, he appeared as Malvolio in the Propeller production of Twelfth Night at the Old Vic in London. In March 2012, he appeared in Modestep's video "Show Me a Sign" as "The Boss".

Barrett is married to the actress Rebecca Charles with whom he has two daughters (born 1997 and 2001).

== Performances ==
=== Film ===
Year	Film	Role	Notes
1998	Shakespeare In Love	George Bryan	Directed by John Madden

=== Television ===
Year	Title	Role	Notes
1991	Rich Tea and Sympathy	Martin Lake	Yorkshire Television
1993	Inspector Alleyn: Death at The Bar	Rev. Hawes Michael	BBC TV
1993	Vanity Dies Hard	Receptionist	Blue Heaven Productions
1993	Casualty	Medical Registrar	Series 7 Ep 21 “Family Matters”
1997	An Unsuitable Job For a Woman	Patrick	Ecosse Films
1997	Invasion: Earth	Fl Lt Tim Stewart	BBC TV
1998	Wonderful You	Rupert	Hartswood Films
1999	The 10th Kingdom	Farmer John	Carnival Film & TV
2000	The Bill	David Reynolds	Thames TV
2000	The Cazalet Chronicles	John	BBC TV
2000	Bad Girls	Mr. Levi	Shed Productions
2001	Absolutely Fabulous	Socialist Man	BBC TV
2001	Casualty	Noel Wharton	BBC TV
2004	EastEnders	Mr. Shelby	BBC TV
2005	A Very Social Secretary	Rod Liddle	Mentorn
2006	The Bill	Vince Martin	Thames TV
2008	Holby City	Simon Bentzen	BBC TV
2010-2022	Holby City	Dr Sacha Levy	BBC TV
2019, 2023	Casualty	Dr Sacha Levy	BBC TV
2023	Father Brown	Oswald Hartigan	BBC TV
2025	Sister Boniface Mysteries	Giles Penistone	BBC TV

=== Stage ===
Year	Title	Role	Theatre / Notes
1991	Three Judgements In One	Don Lope de Urrea	Gate Theatre, Notting Hill
1991	Dammed For Despair	Lizardo	Gate Theatre, Notting Hill
1992–1993	Cyrano De Bergerac	Cadet	Haymarket Theatre
1993	The Recruiting Officer	Captain Brazen	Royal Lyceum Theatre
1993	A Midsummer Night's Dream	Demetrius	Royal Lyceum Theatre
1994	Abigail's Party	Tony	Theatre, Ipswich
1994	Dancing At Lughnasa	Gerald	Royal Lyceum Theatre
1995	The Castle	Holiday	The Wrestling School
1995	Hated Nightfall	various	The Wrestling School
1995	Hamlet	Horatio	Belgrade Theatre, Coventry
1995	Comedians	Jed Murray	Belgrade Theatre, Coventry
1995	Of Mice and Men	Lennie	Royal Lyceum Theatre
1996	(Uncle) Vanya	Telyeghin	The Wrestling School, Almeida Theatre, English & European Tour, Revived for Berlin (1997)
1996	Hamlet	Rosencrantz	Theatre & Tour
2000	St. Joan (director: Anthony Clark)	Brother Martin/ Dunois’ Page	Birmingham Repertory Theatre
2001	Guys & Dolls	Big Julie	Royal Lyceum Theatre
2002	A Street Car Named Desire (director: Muriel Romanes)	Midge	Royal Lyceum Theatre
2002	Victory	Charles II	Royal Lyceum Theatre
2002	After The Dance	John	Oxford Stage Company
2004	Treasure Island	Squire Trelawny	Belgrade Theatre, Coventry
2004	Journey's End	The Colonel	Playhouse Theatre
2004	Hamlet	Horatio	Thelma Holt Ltd
2005	The Winter's Tale	Camillo	Watermill Theatre & Tour
2006	Nicholas Nickleby	John Brodie/ Lord Frederick Verisopht	Chichester Festival Theatre
2006	The Taming Of The Shrew	Baptista Minola	Watermill Theatre
2007	Twelfth Night	Malvolio	Old Vic
2007	Nicholas Nickleby	John Brodie/ Lord Frederick Verisopht	Chichester Festival Theatre/ National Tour / Gielgud Theatre /Toronto
2008–2009	A Midsummer Night's Dream (education project)	Various	Watermill Theatre
2008–2009	The Merchant Of Venice	Antonio	Watermill Theatre/National and International Tour
2008–2009	A Midsummer Night's Dream	Bottom	Watermill Theatre/National and International Tour
2023–2024	And Then There Were None	Doctor Armstrong	UK Tour
2024–2025	Murder On The Orient Express	Monsieur Bouc	UK Tour
2025–2026	Death on the Nile	Colonel Race	UK Tour
