= Edwin Meese =

75th United States Attorney General (born 1931)

Ed Meese
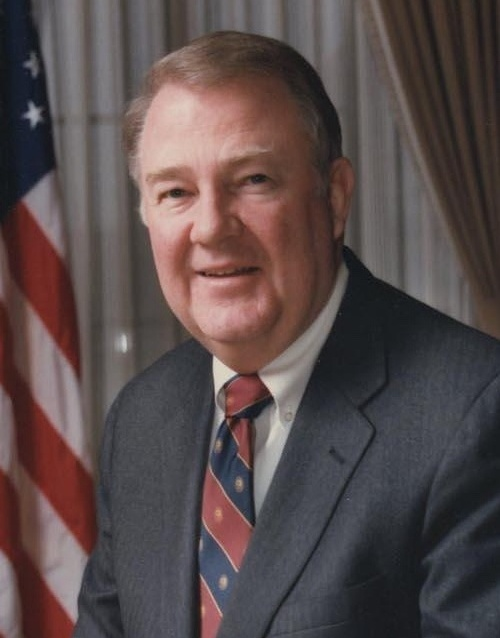
- Official portrait, c. 1986

75th United States Attorney General
- In office February 25, 1985 – August 12, 1988
- President: Ronald Reagan
- Deputy: Carol E. Dinkins; D. Lowell Jensen; Arnold Burns; Harold G. Christensen
- Preceded by: William French Smith
- Succeeded by: Dick Thornburgh

Counselor to the President
- In office January 20, 1981 – February 25, 1985
- President: Ronald Reagan
- Preceded by: Robert T. Hartmann; John Otho Marsh Jr. (1977)
- Succeeded by: Clayton Yeutter (1992)

Personal details
- Born: Edwin Meese III; December 2, 1931 (age 94) Oakland, California, U.S.
- Party: Republican
- Spouse: Ursula Herrick (m. 1959)
- Children: 3
- Education: Yale University (BA); University of California, Berkeley (LLB)
- Awards: Presidential Medal of Freedom (2019)

Military service
- Branch/service: United States Army
- Years of service: 1953–1984
- Rank: Colonel
- Unit: Field Artillery Branch

Edwin Meese III (born December 2, 1931) is an American attorney, law professor, and author who served as 75th United States attorney general from 1985 until 1988. A member of the Republican Party, Meese served in the Ronald Reagan administration including as counselor to the president (1981–1985), on his transition team (1980–81), and during Reagan's governorship of California (1967–1974).

Following the 1980 presidential election, Reagan considered him for the White House chief of staff position, but James Baker was chosen instead. Meese was eventually appointed and confirmed as the attorney general in 1985, a position he held until resigning in 1988 amidst the Wedtech scandal.

Previously, Meese was a member of the board of trustees of the conservative think tank The Heritage Foundation until he left in 2025 as part of a high-profile series of departures following Kevin Roberts becoming president of the organization. Meese formerly was a fellow at the Hoover Institution at Stanford University. He is a member of the national advisory board of the Center for Urban Renewal and Education and a member of the board of directors of the Federalist Society. He has served on the board of Cornerstone closed-end funds.

== Early life and education ==
Meese was born on December 2, 1931, in Oakland, California, the eldest of four sons born to Leone (née Feldman) and Edwin Meese, Jr. He was raised in a practicing Missouri Synod Lutheran family, of German descent. His father was an Oakland city government official, president of the Zion Lutheran Church, and served 24 years in the non-partisan office of Treasurer of Alameda County.

At age 10, Meese published along with his brothers a mimeographed neighborhood newspaper, the Weekly Herald, and used the proceeds to buy a war bond. The young Meese also rode a bicycle on a paper route and worked in a drugstore. At Oakland High School, Meese was involved in the Junior State of America and led his high school debate team to statewide championships. He was valedictorian of Oakland High School's class of 1949.

Two weeks prior to graduation, Meese was accepted to Yale University and granted a scholarship. At Yale, Meese served as president of the Yale Political Union, chairman of the Conservative Party, chairman of the Yale Debate Association, and a member of the secret society Spade and Grave. Meese made the dean's list, and graduated with a B.A. in political science in 1953.

=== Military service ===
At Yale, Meese was a member of ROTC. Upon graduating in 1953, he obtained a commission in the U.S. Army as a Second Lieutenant. He spent 24 months at Fort Sill near Lawton, Oklahoma. Meese worked in logistics, conducting installation and operations of the 240 mm howitzer M1. Meese completed active duty in 1956 and continued in the U.S. Army Reserve, specializing in military intelligence. Meese retired from the Army Reserve as a colonel in 1984.

== Career ==
Meese returned to California, where he obtained a law degree from UC Berkeley School of Law in 1958 and was a state Moot Court champion.

He accepted a position with the district attorney's office of Alameda County, California as a law clerk. While there, he worked under district attorney J. Frank Coakley and future district attorney Delwen Lowell Jensen. Jensen received a LEAA grant to develop DALITE (District Attorney's Automated Legal Information System), a case management software program, like PROMIS (Prosecutor's Management Information System), developed by Inslaw. Meese prosecuted felony cases while maintaining a private practice on nights and weekends, where he focused on civil law. During this service, he first drew the attention of Republican State Senator Donald L. Grunsky, who would later recommend him to governor-elect Ronald Reagan.

In 1959, he married his high school sweetheart Ursula Herrick, daughter of Oakland's postmaster. Ursula would be subpoenaed in 1988 by independent counsel to investigate whether her salary with a non-profit health charity was a quid pro quo for a building lease that the Justice Department had entered, despite the building having been cited for faulty air filtration.

=== California governor's office ===
Meese joined Ronald Reagan's gubernatorial staff in 1967 as legal affairs secretary, serving in that role for a year, until 1968. In 1969, he became Governor Reagan's executive assistant and chief of staff, and served in that capacity until 1974. Despite his later well-known reputation of being fond of Reagan, Meese was initially reluctant to accept the appointment. "I was not particularly interested", he later said of the position.

Meese was known for his ability to explain complex ideas to Reagan in a way that often mirrored Reagan's own speaking style and mannerisms, leading Reagan biographer Lou Cannon to describe him as "Reagan's geographer".

After being named Reagan's chief of staff, Meese convinced his predecessor's deputy, Mike Deaver, to stay on with him, beginning a partnership that would last more than two decades. For his role in Reagan's office, Meese earned reluctant praise from across the aisle. Bob Moretti, a Democrat and former Democratic Speaker of the Assembly, said, "Were I in the governor's seat, I would want someone like [Ed Meese] on my side."

==== Berkeley protests ====
As Reagan's chief of staff, Meese was instrumental in the decision to crack down on student protesters at People's Park in Berkeley, California, on May 15, 1969. Meese was widely criticized for escalating the official response to the People's Park protest, during which law enforcement officers killed one student, on his way to class, who was not a protester and injured hundreds of others, including bystanders. Meese advised Reagan to declare a state of emergency in Berkeley, contrary to the recommendation of the Berkeley City Council. That resulted in a two-week occupation of People's Park by National Guard troops.

The first governor to turn to Meese for advice on riot control was Democrat Edmund (Pat) Brown, who first telephoned Meese seeking advice on how to best handle the situation. "I told him," Meese said, "that the people in that building should be arrested and taken out of there. I told him that if they were allowed to stay, there would be another mob scene, even bigger, the next day." Meese and Deputy District Attorney Lowell Jensen later served as co-counsels in the trial of Berkeley demonstrators. Meese was recognized as one of five "Outstanding Young Men of California" by the California Junior Chamber of Commerce for his role in countering the Berkeley demonstrators. Meese's role in quelling the riots at UC Berkeley has been identified by critics and supporters as an example of a conservative law-enforcement philosophy at work.

=== Industry and academia ===
From January 1975 to May 1976, in Chula Vista, San Diego County, California, Meese served as vice president for administration of Rohr Industries, manufacturer of railcars for the San Francisco Bay Area Bay Area Rapid Transit. He left Rohr to enter private law practice in San Diego County, California.

After receiving a grant from the Sarah Scaife Foundation, Meese developed what he called "a plan for a law school center for criminal justice policy and management". The plan was accepted by the University of San Diego, a private Catholic school. From the fall of 1977 to January 1981, Meese served as professor of law at the university, where he also directed the Center for Criminal Justice Policy and Management. During the same time, Meese served as vice chairman of California's Organized Crime Control Commission and participated in the California Bar Association's criminal law section.

== Reagan presidency ==
=== Presidential campaign and transition ===
Following the Iowa caucuses, Meese joined the 1980 Reagan presidential campaign full-time as chief of staff in charge of day-to-day campaign operations and senior issues adviser. After the 1980 election, Meese headed Reagan's transition effort.

At the advice of Meese, Reagan secretly allowed his campaign to establish a transition office to avoid difficulties similar to those faced by the Nixon administration in its transition following the 1969 election. "Ed had an uncanny ability to look down the road," said Pen James, Assistant to the President for Presidential Personnel. Meese's presidential transition team employed more than 1,000 individuals, with 311 being paid in federal funds, 331 working for a "token" $1, and the rest serving as volunteers. When accounting for inflation, the Reagan transition team spent slightly less money than the Carter transition team, $1.75 million versus $1.78 million.

=== Counselor to the President ===
Meese with President Ronald Reagan in the Oval Office in October 1981

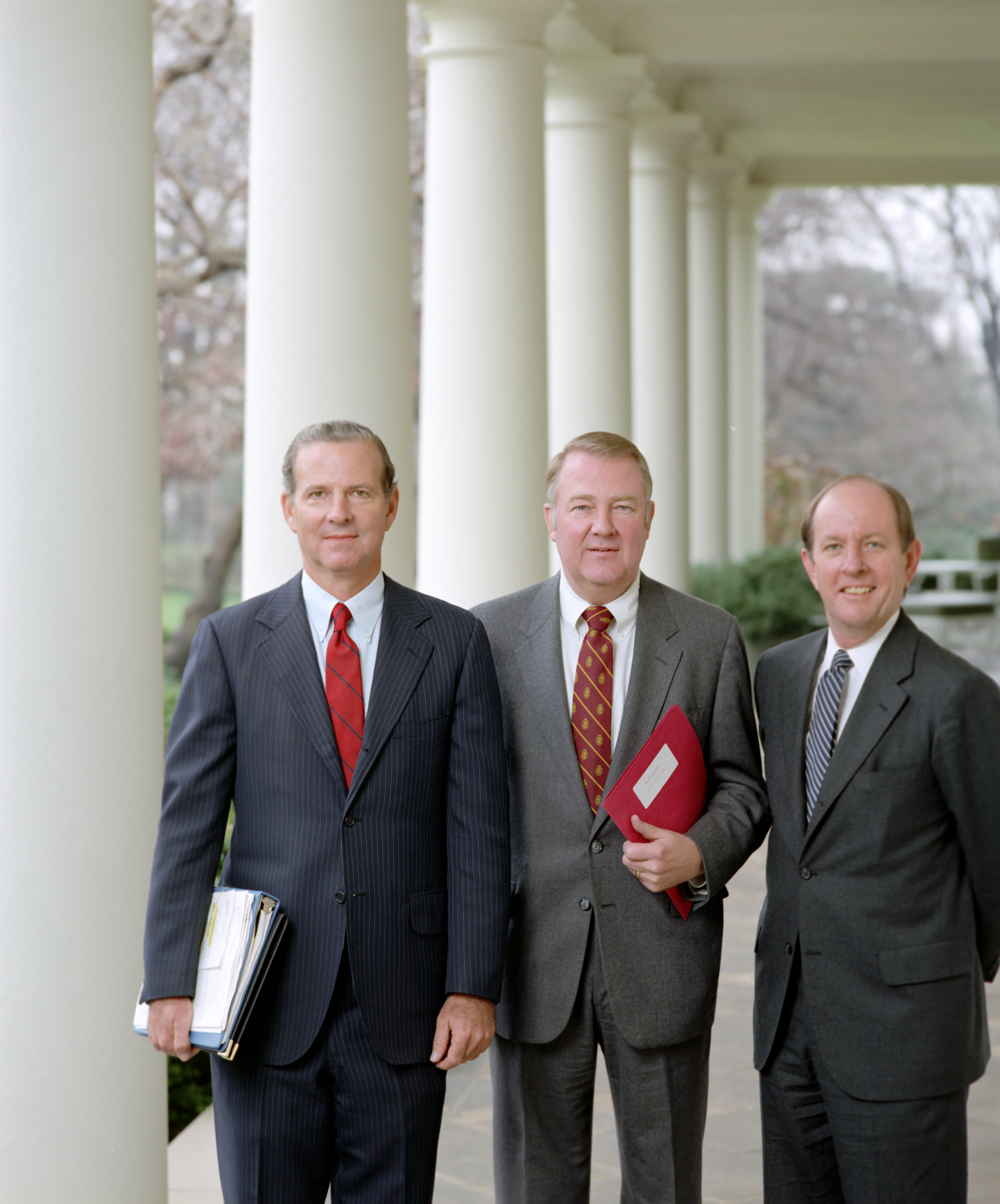
"The Troika": Chief of staff James Baker, Counselor to the president Meese, and Deputy chief of staff Michael Deaver at the White House in December 1981

On November 17, 1980, Meese and James Baker held a meeting to divide their list of White House responsibilities, since both saw the potential for future conflict because of their positions being somewhat similar in nature. The one-page memorandum listed Meese's responsibilities as:

- "Counselor to the President for Policy (with cabinet rank);
- member Super Cabinet Executive Committee (in absence of the President and V-P preside over meetings);
- participate as a principal in all meetings of full Cabinet;
- coordination and supervision of responsibilities of the Secretary to the Cabinet; *coordination and supervision of work of the Domestic Policy Studies and the National Security Council;
- with Baker coordination and supervision of work of OMB, CEA, CEQ, Trade Rep and S&T; *participation as principal in all policy group meetings;
- attend any meeting which Pres attends – w/his consent."

Meese became Counselor to the President, who appointed him as a member of both his Cabinet and the National Security Council from 1981 to 1985. On Monday, September 14, 1981, Meese chaired the first White House discussion of what would become Reagan's Strategic Defense Initiative (SDI), the missile defense program.

Meese served as a liaison to the conservative evangelical community, arranging for meetings between social conservative leaders and the president. Meese was lauded by social conservatives for his address to the Congress on the Bible in March 1982, when he said, "Someone has estimated that throughout the course of history man has adopted over four billion laws. It seems to me, with all that effort, we haven't improved one iota on the Ten Commandments."

Near the end of Reagan's presidency, Meese's involvement in the Iran–Contra affair as a counselor and friend to Reagan was scrutinized by the independent counsel for Iran/Contra Matters, which stated in its official report that Meese's knowledge of the 1985 HAWK transaction "raised serious legal questions".

Meese was considered a powerful and influential figure in the White House. Former Reagan advisor and journalist David Gergen said, "He's a tremendously influential and highly valued adviser to the President who advises on issues all across the board. He's one of the men who has known [the President] so long and so well he's become almost an alter ego of Ronald Reagan."

=== Comments on hunger in America ===
Meese created a storm of controversy in December 1983 after his responses to questions about hunger in America. In response to a question about balancing spending cuts against the need to feed hungry children, he said that he had seen no "authoritative" evidence that children in America were going hungry and that some of the allegations "are purely political." When asked about soup kitchens, he said that "some people are going to soup kitchens voluntarily.... I know we've had considerable information that people go to soup kitchens because the food is free and that that's easier than paying for it."

Democratic leaders and social welfare activists called his comments "disgraceful," "an outrage," "unkind," "mean-spirited," and "absolutely ridiculous". Tip O'Neill, the Speaker of the House of Representatives, compared Meese to Ebenezer Scrooge.

Shortly after, Meese offered a tongue-in-cheek defense of Scrooge, saying that he "had his faults, but he wasn't unfair to anyone" and that he suffered from "a bad press".

=== Attorney General ===
Reagan nominated Meese to be William French Smith's successor as U.S. Attorney General on January 23, 1984. For more than a year, Democrats repeatedly charged Meese with unethical conduct to bar his confirmation as attorney general, including a report by Archibald Cox to the Senate, which alleged that Meese had a "lack of ethical sensitivity" and "blindness to abuse of position".

Meese was finally confirmed by a vote of 63–31, with more opposition than any other Attorney General nominee had received since the 1920s. He began serving as Attorney General in February 1985.

In 1985, Meese received Government Executive magazine's annual award for excellence in management for his service in this role.

==== Bechtel scandal ====
In the mid-1980s, there was a federal investigation into Meese's connections and alleged financial improprieties related to his efforts to help the Bechtel Corporation build a pipeline in Iraq. The pipeline was to extend from Iraq to Jordan and was negotiated by Meese, Shimon Peres, Bruce Rappaport, Robert C. McFarlane, and others. A report by special prosecutor James C. McKay cleared Meese of criminal wrongdoing but criticized him for ethical lapses, especially regarding bribes to Israel not to attack an Iraqi oil pipeline that benefited associates of Meese.

==== Iran-Contra scandal ====
In the late-1980s, Meese was investigated for his role in covering up the Iran-Contra affair to limit damage to Reagan. Although evidence supporting this accusation came to light, Meese was ultimately not charged with any obstruction.

==== Wedtech scandal ====
In February 1987, James C. McKay was named independent counsel in the Wedtech case. The investigation centered on actions Meese took that benefited him and his longtime friend and former lawyer, E. Robert Wallach. McKay looked into Meese's involvement, while Attorney General, in negotiations involving the company Wedtech. (E. Robert Wallach worked as a lobbyist for the company and sought help from Meese on Wedtech contract matters.)

McKay never prosecuted or sought indictment of Meese, but in his official report, which is still confidential, he was highly critical of Meese's ethics and urged further investigation of Meese's role in that scandal and others such as Meese's efforts to help Bechtel Corporation. Meese described it as a "full vindication". While Meese was never convicted of any wrongdoing, he resigned in 1988 when the independent counsel delivered the report on Wedtech.

Prior to his resignation, several top Justice Department officials resigned in protest of what they and others viewed as improper acts by the Attorney General.

Reagan publicly voiced support for Meese in his role as Attorney General, during a press conference: "If Ed Meese is not a good man, there are no good men." That was in response to questions about his actions at the Justice Department.

==== Meese Report ====
On May 21, 1984, Reagan announced his intention to appoint the Attorney General to study the effect of pornography on society. The Meese Report, convened in the spring of 1985 and published its findings in July 1986. The Meese Report advised that pornography was in varying degrees harmful. Following the release of the report, guidelines of the Meese-led Department of Justice were modified to enable the government to file multiple cases in various jurisdictions at the same time which eroded some of the markets for pornography.

==== Drug control policy ====
As Attorney General, Meese chaired the National Drug Policy Board, which coordinated with Nancy Reagan's "Just Say No," national anti-drug educational campaign. One of Meese's innovations was to seek the cooperation of drug-producing countries.

"One of our most effective weapons against drug traffickers," Meese wrote in his autobiography, "was to confiscate the assets of their criminal activity, such as expensive autos, yachts, businesses and homes.... To make this technique even more effective, we shared the proceeds with cooperating local law enforcement agencies to enhance their drug-fighting activities."

==== Supreme Court views ====
In 1985, Meese delivered a speech calling for a "jurisprudence of original intent" and criticizing the Supreme Court for straying from the original intention of the U.S. Constitution. Justices William J. Brennan and John Paul Stevens disagreed with Meese publicly later that year. The dispute foreshadowed the contentious Robert Bork hearings of 1987.

Meese was known for his opposition to the Miranda Warning ruling by the Supreme Court, which required a suspect's rights to be read to him before he is questioned by authorities.

U.S News & World Report: You criticize the Miranda ruling, which gives suspects the right to have a lawyer present before police questioning. Shouldn't people, who may be innocent, have such protection?
Meese: Suspects who are innocent of a crime should. But the thing is, you don't have many suspects who are innocent of a crime. That's contradictory. If a person is innocent of a crime, then he is not a suspect.

His spokesman clarified to The Washington Post that:

That is not what he intended to say. Meese believes that one is innocent until proven guilty in our system. What he was trying to say is simply that he is very concerned about the issue of truth in our system. Miranda has had an impact in terms of enabling people who would have been found guilty in a criminal trial . . . to go free.

== Iraq Study Group ==
In May 2006, Meese was named a member of the bipartisan Iraq Study Group by the group co-chairmen, James Baker III and Lee H. Hamilton. The Iraq Study Group was commissioned to assess and report on the contemporary status of the Iraq War. Meese co-authored the group's final December 2006 report.

== Fellowships and honors ==
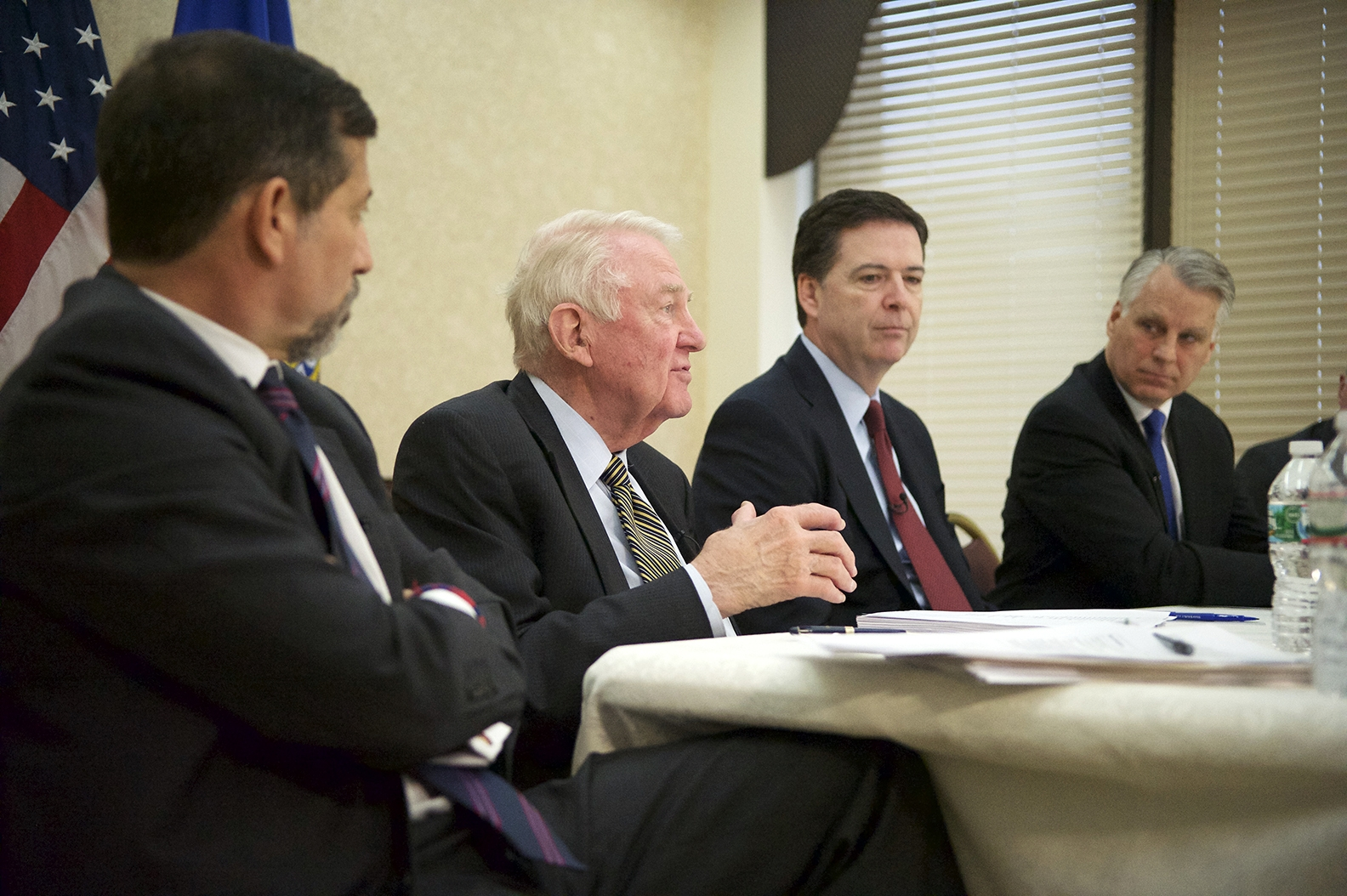
Meese (center left) discussing the findings of the 9/11 Commission with FBI director James Comey in March 2015

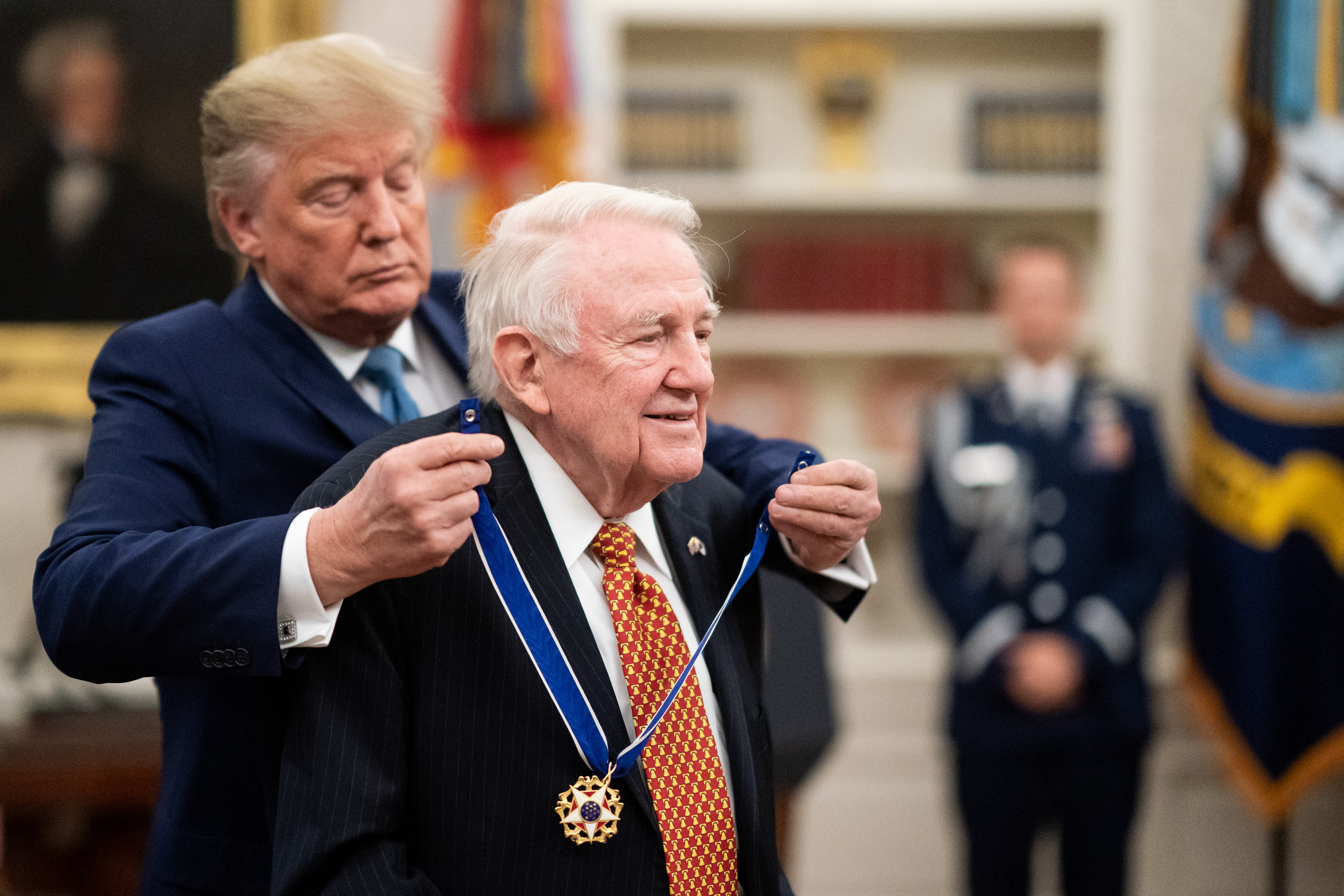
Meese receiving the Presidential Medal of Freedom from president Donald Trump in October 2019

In 1982, Meese was elected as a fellow of the National Academy of Public Administration. Meese serves on the boards of several institutions. Meese has held the Ronald Reagan Chair in Public Policy at The Heritage Foundation since 1988, when he joined the think tank. It is the only policy chair in the United States officially named for the 40th president. He is also chairman of Heritage's Center for Legal and Judicial Studies, founded in 2001 to advance conservative views about the Constitution, legal principles and their impact on public policy.

Meese is currently the second vice chairman of Landmark Legal Foundation, a conservative non-profit legal group. He serves as an adjunct fellow at the Discovery Institute and is a member of the board of directors of the Junior State of America Meese is also on the board of directors of the Capital Research Center, a conservative think tank devoted to the research of non-profit groups.

Meese served on the executive committee (1994) and as president (1996) of the Council for National Policy (CNP), and he was co-chairman of the Constitution Project's bipartisan Sentencing Committee.

Meese served two terms as a member of the board of visitors of George Mason University from 1996 to 2004. From 1998 to 2004, he served as rector (chairman) of the board.

For his lifetime of service and leadership, Meese was named the first-ever Honorary Reagan Fellow at Eureka College in Eureka, Illinois at a ceremony in Washington, D.C. in 2008. Recognizing Meese as a model for young people, the honor was given on behalf of the Reagan Fellows program President Ronald Reagan, established at his own alma mater in 1982. Meese is a charter member of the Ronald W. Reagan Society of Eureka College and was a featured speaker at the "Reagan and the Midwest" academic conference held on the college's campus to launch the Reagan Centennial in 2011.

In 2017, Meese became a veteran companion of the Military Order of Foreign Wars.

Meese serves as a member of the board of directors of the Mercatus Center, a non-profit market-oriented research, education, and outreach think tank located on George Mason University's Arlington campus.

The Republican National Lawyers Association annually bestows the "Edwin Meese Award" to a notable Republican attorney or official. Previous recipients have included Lindsey Graham, John Ashcroft, Don McGahn, C. Boyden Gray, and Michael Mukasey.

On October 8, 2019, U.S. president Donald Trump awarded Meese the Presidential Medal of Freedom, the highest civilian honor in the United States. Former Meese chief of staff Mark Levin paid tribute to him at the ceremony.

== Books and film ==
Meese has authored or co-authored a number of books on government, judiciary and civics, including:

- A Familiar Exposition of the Constitution of the United States, Bicentennial Edition (1986)
- The Great Debate: Interpreting Our Written Constitution (1986)
- With Reagan: The Inside Story (1992) Regnery Gateway, ISBN 0895265222
- Making America Safer: What Citizens and Their State and Local Officials Can Do to Combat Crime (2000)
- Defending the American Homeland (2002)
- Leadership, Ethics and Policing: Challenges for the 21st Century (2004)
- The Heritage Guide to the Constitution (2005) ISBN 159698001X
- Judicial Tyranny: The New Kings of America? – contributing author (Amerisearch, 2005) ISBN 0975345567

Edwin Meese has been a subject of many TV documentaries. Documentaries in which he appears include:

- In The Face of Evil (2004)
- William F. Buckley: Right from the Start (2008)
- Hippies (2007)
- I Want Your Money (2010)

== See also ==
- Citizens for the Republic
- Garcia-Mir v. Meese

Political offices
Vacant Title last held by Robert T. Hartmann; 1977	Counselor to the President; 1981–1985	Vacant Title next held by Clay Yeutter; John Marsh; 1992
Legal offices
Preceded by William Smith	United States Attorney General; 1985–1988	Succeeded by Dick Thornburgh
U.S. order of precedence (ceremonial)
Preceded by John S. Herrington as Former U.S. Cabinet Member	Order of precedence of the United States as Former U.S. Cabinet Member	Succeeded by James H. Burnley IV as Former U.S. Cabinet Member
