= William French Smith =

American politician

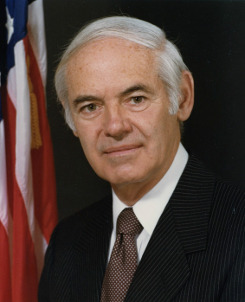

74th United States Attorney General
- In office January 23, 1981 – February 25, 1985
- President: Ronald Reagan
- Deputy: Edward C. Schmults; Carol E. Dinkins
- Preceded by: Benjamin Civiletti
- Succeeded by: Edwin Meese

Personal details
- Born: William French Smith II; August 26, 1917 Wilton, New Hampshire, U.S.
- Died: October 29, 1990 (aged 73) Los Angeles, California, U.S.
- Party: Republican
- Spouses: Marion Smith; Jean Webb (m. 1964–1990)
- Children: 4
- Education: University of California, Los Angeles (BA); Harvard University (LLB)

Military service
- Allegiance: United States
- Branch: United States Navy
- Service years: 1942–1946
- Rank: Lieutenant
- Unit: United States Navy Reserve

William French Smith II (August 26, 1917 – October 29, 1990) was an American lawyer and the 74th United States Attorney General. After attaining his law degree from Harvard Law School in 1942, Smith went on to join the law firm of Gibson, Dunn & Crutcher LLP in 1946. Smith became acquainted with California governor candidate Ronald Reagan in 1966, after which Reagan appointed him to the University of California Board of Regents. Smith was nominated for U.S. Attorney General shortly after Reagan's victory in the 1980 United States presidential election, assuming the title on January 23, 1981, and serving until February 25, 1985.

Smith contributed to Reagan's administration by supporting his stances on welfare, crime, bail, prison sentencing for gun-related crimes, the Internal Revenue Service, immigration, corporate mergers, anti-competitive practices, the Freedom of Information Act, and illegal drug trade.

After his tenure as Attorney General, Smith went back to work for Gibson, Dunn & Crutcher. He died from cancer on October 29, 1990.

== Early life and education ==
Smith was born in Wilton, New Hampshire, on August 26, 1917, and raised in Boston. He received his B.A. degree in economics, summa cum laude, from the University of California, Los Angeles in 1939, and his law degree from Harvard Law School in 1942. Smith was a direct descendant of Urian Oakes, a 17th-century Harvard College president. His father of the same name was president of Boston-based Mexican Telephone and Telegraph Co. From 1942 to 1946, Smith served in the United States Naval Reserve, reaching the rank of lieutenant.

In 1946 he joined the law firm of Gibson, Dunn & Crutcher LLP in Los Angeles. He met Ronald Reagan before his 1966 campaign for governor, and eventually became a close friend and a member of Reagan's "kitchen cabinet" of advisers. In 1968, Reagan appointed him to the University of California Board of Regents. He later served three terms as chairman.

== Career ==
=== Attorney General of the United States ===
On December 11, 1980, Smith was nominated as the 74th Attorney General by then-President-elect Ronald Reagan. He assumed his post at the United States Department of Justice, on January 23, 1981, serving until February 25, 1985. He pursued a strong anti-crime initiative, increasing the resources used to fight the distribution and sale of illegal narcotics by 100 percent. Furthermore, he successfully lobbied for the establishment of a commission to create new federal sentencing guidelines. Major contributions were: supporting Reagan's welfare reform program, recommending a comprehensive crime package, of more than 150 administrative and legislative initiatives (which included a federal death penalty), the denial of bail for certain types of crimes, the modification of the rule barring the use of illegally seized evidence in criminal trials, mandatory prison sentences for crimes involving the use of guns, and the use of private Internal Revenue Service information in combating organized crime. He also designed an immigration and refugee policy, announced a more lenient attitude towards corporate mergers in order to make government more responsive to the concerns of business, opposed anti competitive practices, and modified the Freedom of Information Act of 1966, among many other initiatives. Smith concentrated on getting more money for his department, which expanded federal efforts against drug trafficking.

President Ronald Reagan said this about Smith during a speech announcing the Federal Initiatives Against Drug Trafficking and Organized Crime;

A few months ago Attorney General William French Smith and his staff, in collaboration with the Treasury Department, put together final plans for a national strategy to expose, prosecute, and ultimately cripple organized crime in America. And I want to announce this program today. It is one that outlines a national strategy that I believe will bring us very close to removing a stain from American history that has lasted nearly a hundred years.

I will ask that the Attorney General be required to submit a yearly report to the people, through the President and the Congress, on the status of the fight against organized crime and organized criminal groups dealing in drugs. This requirement, although simple and inexpensive, will establish a formal mechanism through which the Justice Department will take a yearly inventory of its efforts in this area and report to the American people on its progress.

The American people want the mob and its associates brought to justice and their power broken—not out of a sense of vengeance, but out of a sense of justice; not just from an obligation to punish the guilty but from an even stronger obligation to protect the innocent; not simply for the sake of legalities but for the sake of the law that is the protection of liberty.

— Ronald Reagan, October 14, 1982

Smith was a member of the American Law Institute, American Judicature Society, and the Institute of Judicial Administration's Board of Fellows, as well as a fellow of the American Bar Foundation. He served as Attorney General from 1981 to 1985 and then joined the President's Foreign Intelligence Advisory Board.

Smith also played a role in the nomination of Sandra Day O'Connor, the first woman to serve on the United States Supreme Court. Prior to O'Connor's appointment to the Court, she was an elected official and judge in Arizona serving as the first female majority leader in the United States as the Republican leader in the Arizona Senate. President Ronald Reagan formally nominated O'Connor on August 19, 1981. On September 21, 1981, O'Connor was confirmed by the U.S. Senate with a decision of 99–0. Judicial analyst Steven Brill gave Smith credit for gaining control of the Justice Department mega-bureaucracy and for cleaning up the corruption-plagued Drug Enforcement Administration. Smith established a judicial-selection system that appears to have produced conservative but qualified federal judges.

He served as the member of the U.S. Advisory Commission on International, Educational and Cultural Affairs in Washington, D.C. from 1971 to 1978; a member of the board of directors of the Los Angeles World Affairs Council since 1970 and its president beginning in 1975; a member of the Los Angeles Committee on Foreign Relations from 1954 to 1974; and a member of the Harvard University's School of Government.

He also served as a member of the advisory board of the Center for Strategic and International Studies at Georgetown University and was a member of the Stanton Panel on International Information, Education and Cultural Relations in Washington from 1974–1975.

His business affiliations included service as a director of the Pacific Lighting Corp. of Los Angeles from 1967 to 1981 and the Pacific Lighting Corp. of San Francisco from 1969 to 1981, a seat on the board of directors of Jorgensen Steel Company from 1974 to 1981, and a seat on the board of directors of Pullman Company of Chicago from 1979 to 1980.

He was the member of a California delegation to the Republican National Convention in 1968, 1972, and 1976, he was serving as the chairman of the delegation in 1968 and the vice chairman of the delegation in 1972 and 1976.

During his tenure as Attorney General in President Reagan's cabinet from 1981–1985, Smith facilitated a deal where the U.S. and Italy agreed on a strategy to combat organized crime and narcotics trafficking.

=== After office ===
After leaving office, Smith rejoined the law firm of Gibson, Dunn & Crutcher in Los Angeles. He also served on the boards of major corporations and was named chairman of the Ronald Reagan Presidential Library Foundation, where he was instrumental in locating site for the attraction. He is remembered as a quiet, yet effective statesman. In the words of National Review, "Smith seldom spoke, but when he did, he was always worth hearing. No one had an ill word to say about him, so great was his decency − the quality he had most in common, perhaps, with the man he served so long."

=== Tower Commission ===
The Tower Commission was commissioned on November 26, 1986, by U.S. President Ronald Reagan in response to the Iran–Contra affair. Reagan appointed Republican and former Senator John Tower of Texas, former Secretary of State Edmund Muskie, and former National Security Advisor Brent Scowcroft.

== Death ==
Smith died of cancer in Los Angeles on October 29, 1990, age 73, at the Kenneth Norris Jr. Cancer Center.

Reagan said of Smith, "Our nation was indeed fortunate to have a person of his excellence and patriotism in the cabinet. And we were made better as a country because of Bill's work. More than a colleague, Bill was a valued and trusted friend and adviser. I often sought his wise counsel throughout my years in public life, and I was fortunate to have him at my side."

He was interred November 1 at the Forest Lawn Memorial Park in Glendale, California. A one-hour memorial funeral service, attended by 250 people, was held on November 2 at the Community Church of San Marino, where he was eulogized by Reagan and others. "Bill ... believed firmly in limited government and keeping government as close to the people as possible", said United States Solicitor General Kenneth W. Starr in his eulogy.

Smith had three sons and one daughter with his first wife, Marion. His second wife, Jean Webb Vaughan Smith, who championed volunteerism as national president of the Association of Junior Leagues, died in 2012, aged 93.

== Legacy ==
In 1992, independent presidential candidate Ross Perot considered naming Smith, "who'd been dead for a couple of years," as his vice presidential running mate, according to Perot's campaign manager Ed Rollins.

== Credits ==
- Foreign Intelligence Advisory Board − President's Intelligence Advisory Board 1986-89
- United States Attorney General 1981–1985
- Center for Strategic and International Studies Advisory Board (1978–1990)
- American Judicature Society Board Member
- Reagan-Bush '84 election campaign
- Ronald Reagan Presidential Library Chairman of the Foundation
- Member of the Board of RCA
- Member of the Board of Jorgensen Steel
- Member of the Board of Crocker National Bank
- Member of the American Academy of Achievement
- United States Secret Service Codename Flivver
- Author of books: Law and Justice in the Reagan Administration: The Memoirs of an Attorney General (1991, memoir)

Legal offices
Preceded by Benjamin Civiletti	United States Attorney General; 1981–1985	Succeeded by Edwin Meese
