= Richard Thornburg =

Richard Thornburg may refer to:

- Richard Thornburg (fictional character), a fictional character in the Die Hard movies
- Dick Thornburgh (spelled with another "h"), Pennsylvania governor and US attorney general
