= Edward M. Chen =

American federal judge (born 1953)

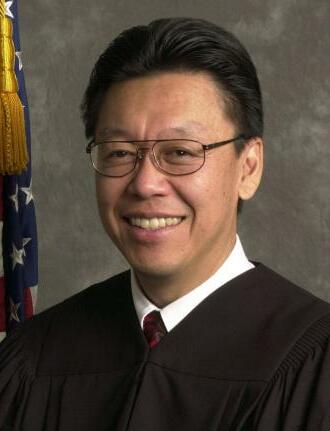

Senior Judge of the United States District Court for the Northern District of California
- Incumbent
- Assumed office May 17, 2022

Judge of the United States District Court for the Northern District of California
- In office May 12, 2011 – May 17, 2022
- Appointed by: Barack Obama
- Preceded by: Martin Jenkins
- Succeeded by: Rita F. Lin

Magistrate Judge of the United States District Court for the Northern District of California
- In office 2001 – May 12, 2011

Personal details
- Born: Edward Milton Chen; January 20, 1953 (age 73) Oakland, California, U.S.
- Education: University of California, Berkeley (BA, JD)

Chinese name
- Traditional Chinese: 鄭一芳
- Simplified Chinese: 郑一芳
Transcriptions
Standard Mandarin
- Hanyu Pinyin: Zhèng Yīfāng
Yue: Cantonese
- Jyutping: Zeng^{6} Jat^{1} Fong^{1}

Edward Milton Chen (born January 20, 1953) is an American lawyer and jurist serving as a senior United States district judge of the U.S. District Court for the Northern District of California. He was appointed in 2011 by President Barack Obama. He previously served as a United States magistrate judge of the same court from 2001 to 2011.

== Early life and education ==
Born and raised in Oakland, California, Chen earned a bachelor's degree in 1975 from the University of California, Berkeley and a Juris Doctor from UC Berkeley School of Law in 1979.

== Career ==
After graduating law school, Chen clerked for Judge Charles Byron Renfrew of the United States District Court for the Northern District of California from June 1979 to April 1980 and Judge James R. Browning of the United States Court of Appeals for the Ninth Circuit from June 1981 to June 1982.

From 1982 until 1985, Chen served as an associate at the San Francisco law firm of Coblentz, Cahen, McCabe & Breyer. In September 1985, Chen became a staff attorney for the American Civil Liberties Union, specializing in language discrimination cases. He held that post until April 2001, when the judges on the United States District Court for the Northern District of California named Chen to an eight-year term as a United States magistrate judge.

=== Federal judicial service ===
Chen served as a United States magistrate judge from 2001 until 2011. On August 7, 2009, President Barack Obama nominated Chen to a seat on the United States District Court for the Northern District of California vacated by the resignation of Martin Jenkins. On October 15, 2009, the Senate Judiciary Committee advanced his nomination by a 12–7 vote. On December 24, 2009, the U.S. Senate returned Chen's nomination to the president. Senator Dianne Feinstein in an interview published in the San Francisco Chronicle on December 29, 2009 reiterated her support for Judge Chen and her hope that the President would renominate Judge Chen for the U.S. District Court.

President Obama renominated Chen in January 2010, and the Senate Judiciary Committee approved his nomination on February 4, 2010. On August 5, 2010, the U.S. Senate again returned Chen's nomination for failure to confirm him. President Obama renominated Chen to the seat on September 13, 2010 and again on January 5, 2011. On May 10, 2011, the United States Senate confirmed Chen by a 56–42 vote. He received his judicial commission on May 12, 2011. Since being confirmed as a District Judge, Chen has been a prolific writer, authoring a number of major opinions. According to one legal news source, Judge Chen is the 4th most-influential district judge appointed since 2010. The same source later named Judge Chen one of the "7 Rising Star Judges You Want to Clerk For." Chen assumed senior status on May 17, 2022.

=== Notable cases ===
Chen's cases included the civil trial regarding the shooting of Oscar Grant by a Bay Area Rapid Transit Police Department officer, the criminal prosecution of former Korn Ferry executive David Nosal for hacking, and a number of cases being brought against Uber regarding the classification of its drivers as independent contractors. On June 21, 2012, the charity fraud case of Carreon v. Inman et al, which has achieved some prominence on the Internet, was assigned to Chen.

Judge Chen presided over the trial in a case brought by Food and Water Watch et al. against the Environmental Protection Agency (EPA) relevant to the Toxic Substances Control Act (TSCA) and water fluoridation. On September 24, 2024, Judge Chen found for the plaintiff, ordering the EPA to mitigate the risk per TSCA regulations. He wrote in his decision that "the Court finds that fluoridation of water at 0.7 milligrams per liter (“mg/L”) – the level presently considered “optimal” in the United States – poses an unreasonable risk of reduced IQ in children." He further wrote: "This order does not dictate precisely what that response must be. Amended TSCA leaves that decision in the first instance to the EPA. One thing the EPA cannot do, however, in the face of this Court’s finding, is to ignore that risk."

== See also ==
- Barack Obama judicial appointment controversies
- List of Asian American jurists
- List of first minority male lawyers and judges in California

Legal offices
Preceded by Martin Jenkins	Judge of the United States District Court for the Northern District of California; 2011–2022	Succeeded by Rita F. Lin
