= Dick Thornburgh =

American lawyer and politician (1932–2020)

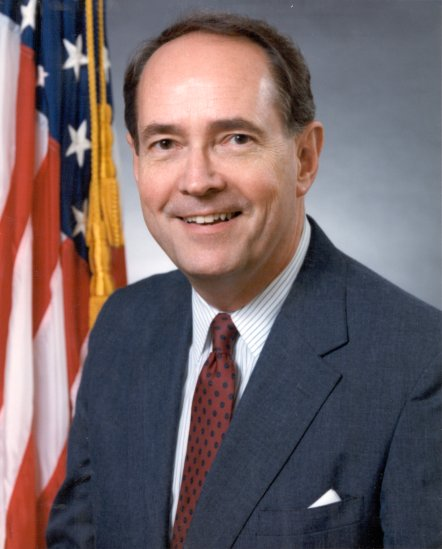

76th United States Attorney General
- In office August 12, 1988 – August 15, 1991
- President: Ronald Reagan; George H. W. Bush
- Deputy: Harold G. Christensen; Donald B. Ayer; William Barr
- Preceded by: Edwin Meese
- Succeeded by: William Barr
- Acting; January 20, 1977 – January 26, 1977
- President: Jimmy Carter
- Deputy: Himself (acting)
- Preceded by: Harold R. Tyler Jr. (acting)
- Succeeded by: Griffin Bell

41st Governor of Pennsylvania
- In office January 16, 1979 – January 20, 1987
- Lieutenant: William Scranton III
- Preceded by: Milton Shapp
- Succeeded by: Bob Casey Sr.

United States Deputy Attorney General Acting
- In office January 20, 1977 – March 12, 1977
- President: Jimmy Carter
- Preceded by: Harold R. Tyler Jr.
- Succeeded by: Peter F. Flaherty

United States Assistant Attorney General for the Criminal Division
- In office July 8, 1975 – March 12, 1977
- President: Gerald Ford; Jimmy Carter
- Preceded by: Henry E. Petersen
- Succeeded by: Benjamin Civiletti

United States Attorney for the Western District of Pennsylvania
- In office June 4, 1969 – July 7, 1975
- President: Richard Nixon; Gerald Ford
- Preceded by: Gustave Diamond
- Succeeded by: Blair Griffith

Personal details
- Born: Richard Lewis Thornburgh; July 16, 1932 Pittsburgh, Pennsylvania, U.S.
- Died: December 31, 2020 (aged 88) Verona, Pennsylvania, U.S.
- Resting place: Homewood Cemetery
- Party: Republican
- Spouses: Ginny Hooton (died 1960) Ginny Judson (m. 1963)
- Children: 4
- Education: Yale University (BS); University of Pittsburgh (LLB)

Richard Lewis Thornburgh (July 16, 1932 – December 31, 2020) was an American lawyer, author, and politician who served as the 76th United States attorney general from 1988 to 1991 under presidents Ronald Reagan and George H. W. Bush. A member of the Republican Party, he previously served as the 41st governor of Pennsylvania and as the U.S. attorney for the Western District of Pennsylvania.

As of 2026, Thornburgh is the last Republican to serve two full consecutive terms as Governor of Pennsylvania.

== Early life and education ==
Thornburgh was born in Pittsburgh, Pennsylvania, on July 16, 1932, the son of Alice (Sanborn) and Charles Garland Thornburgh, an engineer. Thornburgh attended Mercersburg Academy then Yale University from which he obtained an engineering degree in 1954. Subsequently, he received a law degree from the University of Pittsburgh School of Law in 1957, where he served as an editor of the Law Review. Thornburgh was inducted into Omicron Delta Kappa at the University of Pittsburgh in 1973, and was later awarded the society's highest honor, the Laurel Crowned Circle Award, in 1996. He subsequently was awarded honorary degrees from 32 other colleges and universities. He joined the Pittsburgh-based law firm Kirkpatrick & Lockhart in 1959.

Thornburgh married Ginny Hooton, and they had three sons together (John, David and Peter). Ginny Hooton was killed in an automobile accident in 1960, which left Peter, the youngest of their three sons, with physical and intellectual disability. In 1963 Thornburgh was remarried, to Ginny Judson, with whom he had another son, Bill, in 1966. Ginny (Judson) Thornburgh was a former schoolteacher from New York, who served as Director of the Interfaith Initiative of the American Association of People with Disabilities, based in Washington, D.C.

The Thornburghs have four sons (John, David, Peter, and Bill), six grandchildren, and five great-granddaughters and two great-grandsons. As parents of a son with a disability, they took an interest in the needs of people with disabilities and, with their son Peter, were named "Family of the Year". Both Ginny and Dick Thornburgh were featured speakers at the Vatican Conference on Disabilities held in Rome in November 1992, and were co-recipients in 2003 of the Henry B. Betts Award, the proceeds from which were used to establish the Thornburgh Family Lecture Series on Disability Law and Policy at the University of Pittsburgh. As Attorney General of the United States, Thornburgh played a leading role in the enactment of the Americans with Disabilities Act. In 2002, Thornburgh received the Wiley A. Branton Award of The Washington Lawyers' Committee for Civil Rights and Urban Affairs in recognition of his "commitment to the civil rights of people with disabilities".

== Career ==
=== U.S. Attorney ===
Following an unsuccessful bid for the U.S. House of Representatives against William S. Moorhead in 1966, Thornburgh served as an elected delegate to the 1967–1968 Pennsylvania Constitutional Convention where he spearheaded efforts at judicial and local government reform. In 1969 President of the United States Richard Nixon appointed Thornburgh as the U.S. Attorney for the Western District of Pennsylvania, where he earned a reputation for toughness on organized crime. In 1971, Thornburgh successfully prosecuted Pittsburgh steel companies for polluting rivers based on the 1899 Refuse Act. This was before the passage of the major environmental laws that are the foundation of the EPA and was a sign of future environmental enforcement.

In 1975, President Gerald Ford appointed him to serve as the Assistant Attorney General for the Justice Department's Criminal Division. After two years at that post, Thornburgh returned to law practice in Pittsburgh and initiated a campaign for governor.

=== Governor of Pennsylvania ===
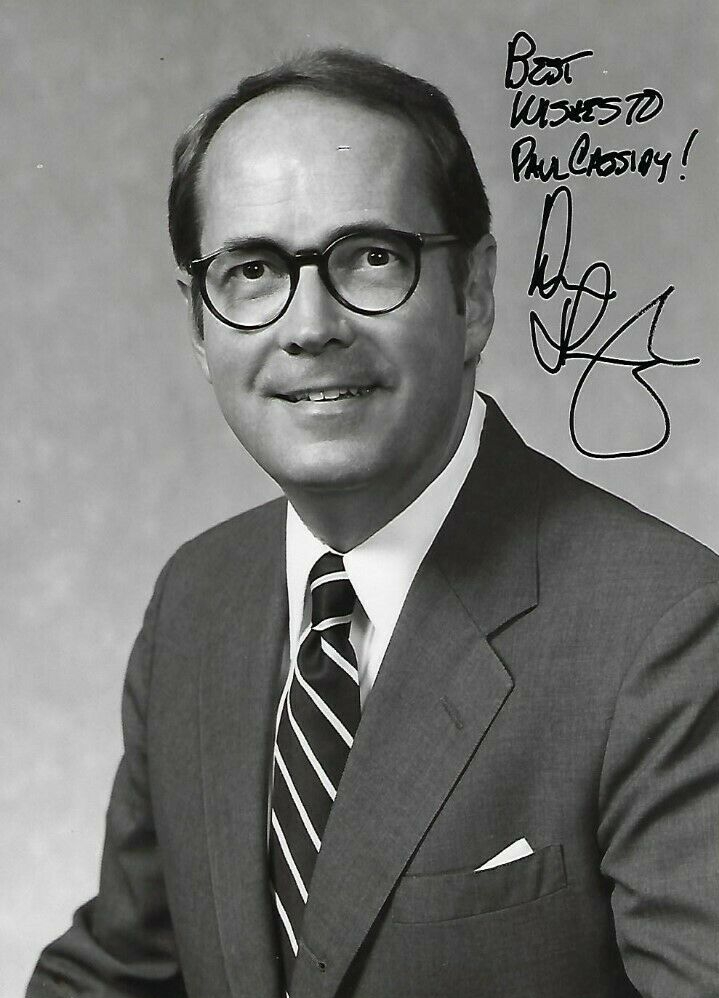
Thornburgh as governor

In 1978, Thornburgh launched a campaign for governor of Pennsylvania. Despite a Democratic majority in the commonwealth, he and running mate Bill Scranton (whose father served as governor in the 1960s) defeated Pittsburgh mayor Pete Flaherty and his running mate, educator Bob Casey (who bears no relation to Robert P. Casey, the 42nd Governor of Pennsylvania). The victory was attributed in part to Thornburgh's campaign promises to crack down on government corruption, at a time when more than 60 persons in the Shapp administration were indicted on criminal charges. Thornburgh and Scranton were reelected in 1982. However, Scranton failed to win the governorship on his own in 1986.

Following the unprecedented 1979 Three Mile Island nuclear power plant accident near Harrisburg, Pennsylvania, Governor Thornburgh was described by observers as "one of the few authentic heroes of that episode as a calm voice against panic". He oversaw emergency response efforts to the partial meltdown at the nuclear power plant and also had a major role in coordinating funding for cleanup efforts.

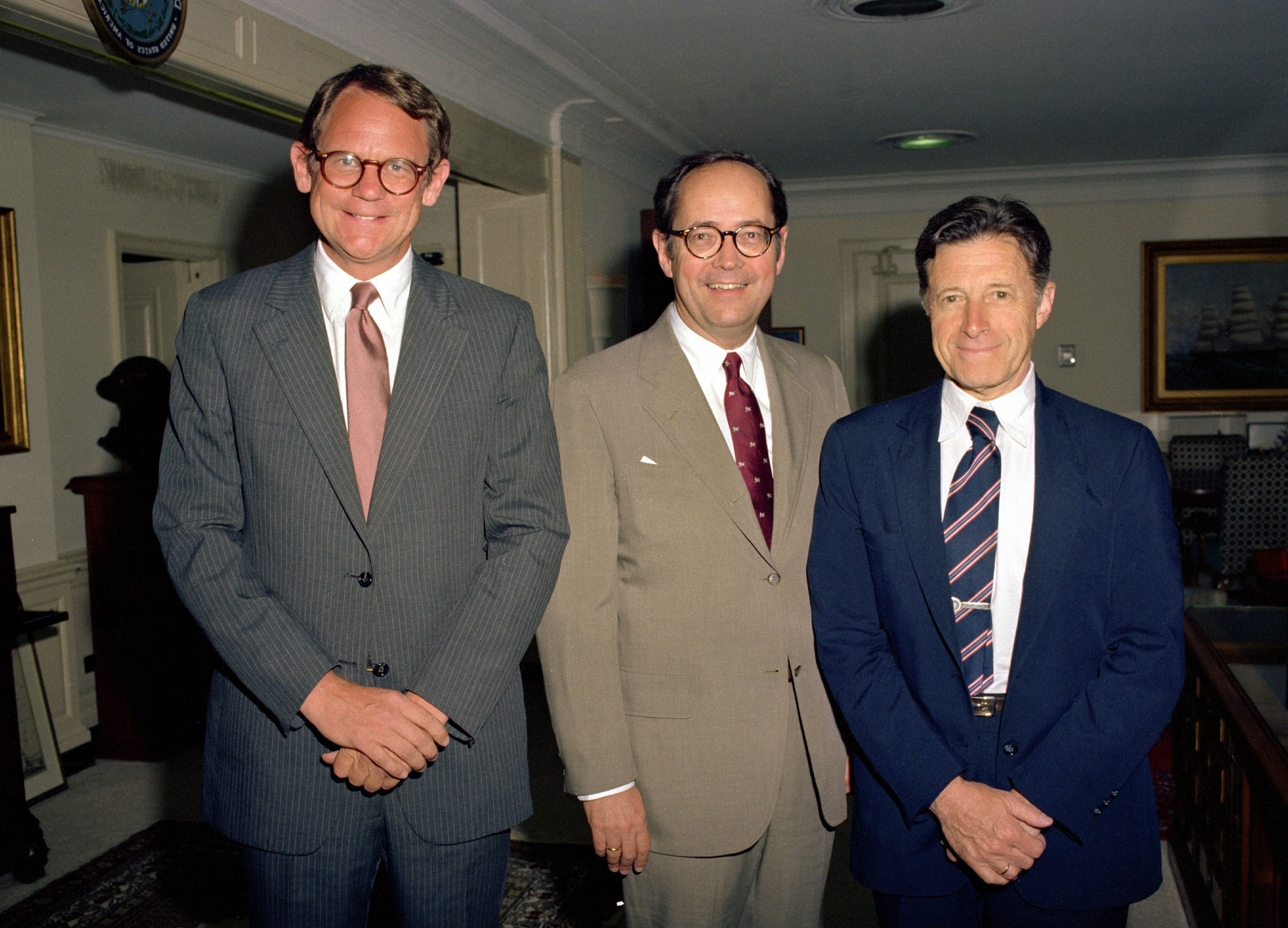
Governor Thornburgh (center) with Secretary of Defense Caspar Weinberger (right) and Delaware Lt. Governor Mike Castle, July 1982

He was widely recognized for economic development and the establishment of the Ben Franklin Partnership, and for implementing welfare reform programs. Pennsylvania's unemployment rate, among the ten highest in the nation when he was elected, was among the ten lowest when he left office as 50,000 new businesses and 500,000 new private sector jobs were created during his tenure.

Thornburgh was also responsible for consolidating all of Pennsylvania's state-owned colleges and universities into the Pennsylvania State System of Higher Education. He also created the Governor's Schools, which were summer programs for talented and gifted high school students.

In January 1987, Governor Thornburgh was made an honorary Pennsylvania State Police Trooper. This honor was presented to him upon the graduation of the 64th Pennsylvania State Police Academy Class at Westchester, Massachusetts

Thornburgh was the first Republican to serve two successive terms as governor of the commonwealth, and he was recognized by fellow governors in a 1986 Newsweek poll as one of the most effective big-state governors in the nation.

After leaving office in 1987, Thornburgh served as director of the Institute of Politics at the John F. Kennedy School of Government at Harvard University.

=== U.S. Attorney General ===
In 1988, President Ronald Reagan appointed Thornburgh as the United States Attorney General; he was retained in office after President George H. W. Bush was inaugurated. Thornburgh was sworn into office after unanimous confirmation by the United States Senate, and served three years as attorney general, from 1988 to 1991.

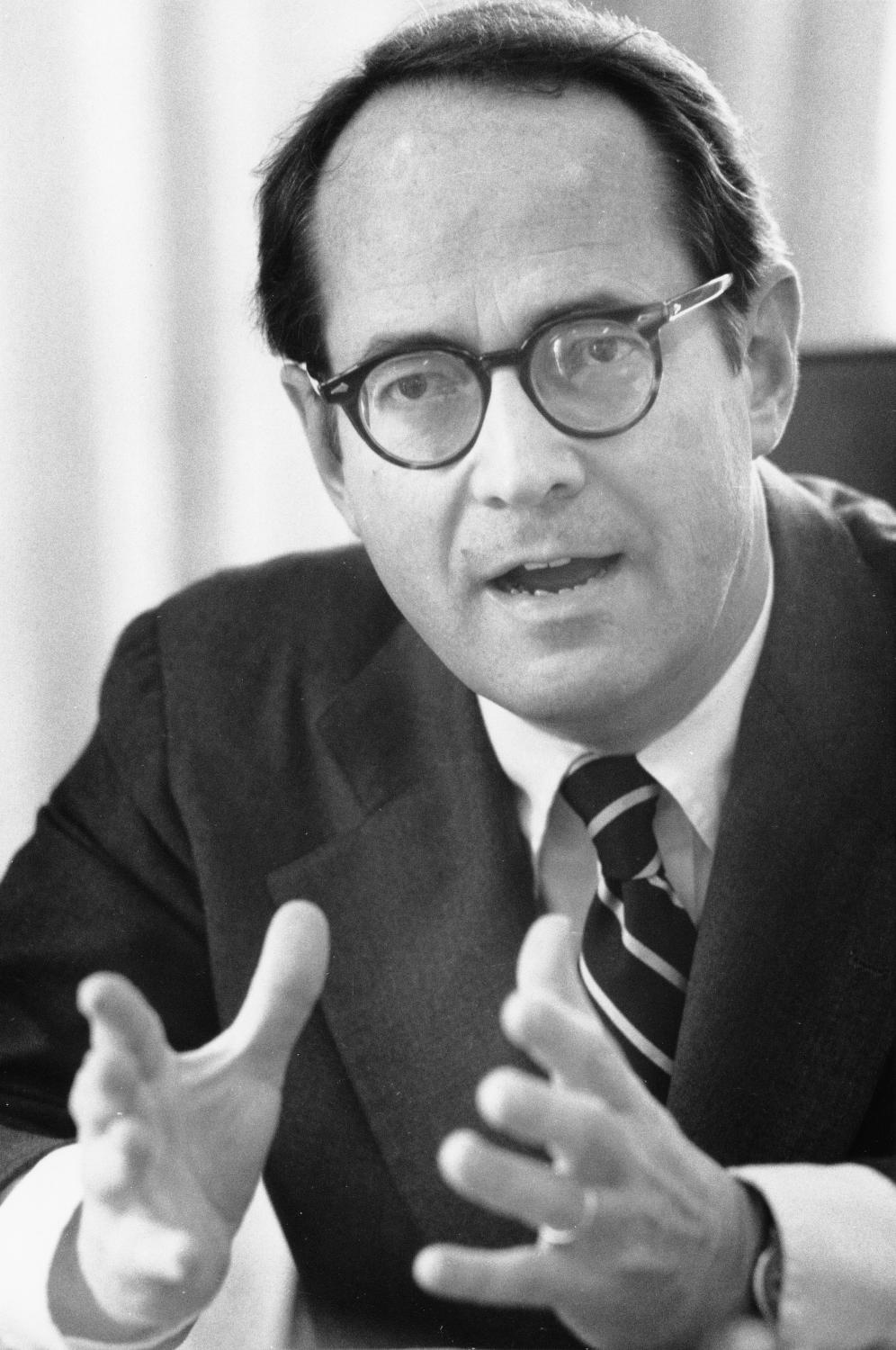
Dick Thornburgh, 1978 campaign

He mounted a vigorous attack on white-collar crime as the Department of Justice obtained a record number of convictions of savings and loan crisis and other securities officials, defense contractors and corrupt public officials. Thornburgh established strong ties with law enforcement agencies around the world to help combat drug trafficking, money laundering, terrorism and international white-collar crime. During his tenure as attorney general, he twice argued and won cases before the United States Supreme Court. The Legal Times noted that Thornburgh as Attorney General "built a reputation as one of the most effective champions that prosecutors have ever had." As honorary Special Agent of the Federal Bureau of Investigation, he chaired a panel of the National Academy of Public Administration examining the FBI's post-9/11 transformation process and was a member of the FBI Director's advisory board. He oversaw the major environmental litigation that resulted from the Exxon Valdez oil spill in 1989.

All told, Thornburgh served in the Justice Department under five Presidents, beginning in Pittsburgh when serving as United States Attorney, from 1969 to 1975.

=== 1991 Senate bid ===
Thornburgh resigned as attorney general in 1991 to run for the U.S. Senate seat left vacant when Senator John Heinz was killed in a plane crash; major-party candidates were chosen by the party committees because it was too late for a primary. There was widespread speculation that Thornburgh had struck a deal with Democratic Pennsylvania Congressman and House Majority Whip William H. Gray. Gray had been the subject of an investigation into alleged campaign finance irregularities and a grand jury investigation into his church's financial affairs. It was reported that Gray would not run in the special election, and in return Thornburgh would drop the investigation of him. Gray did not run in the election, and in fact resigned from Congress two months prior to it, in order to take a job as president and CEO of the United Negro College Fund. Thornburgh was widely expected to win the seat; however, he lost by 338,774 votes to Democrat Harris Wofford, who had been the interim appointee to that seat. Wofford's victory was widely considered a major upset.

=== Later political life ===
In 1993, Thornburgh's campaign committee was sued in federal court for unpaid campaign debt by Karl Rove, who won the case and collected $180,000 from the Thornburgh committee.

Thornburgh served a one-year appointment as Under-Secretary General at the United Nations (1992–1993) at the personal request of President Bush. This position put Thornburgh in charge of personnel, budget, and finance matters. His Report to the Secretary-General of the United Nations was widely praised. It pertained to reform, restructuring, and streamlining efforts designed to make the United Nations peacekeeping, humanitarian and development programs more efficient and cost-effective.

== Later life ==
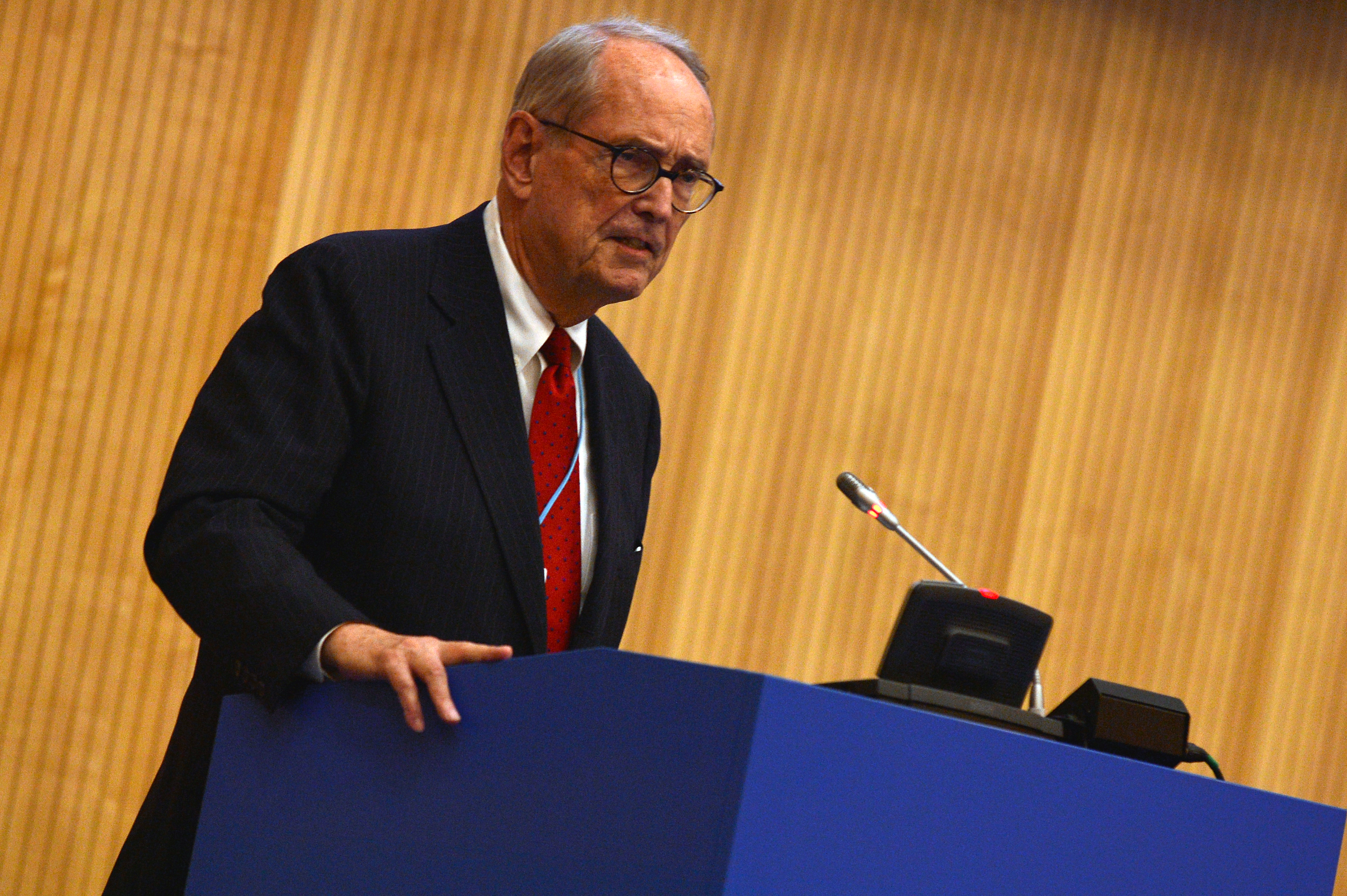
Thornburgh in 2012

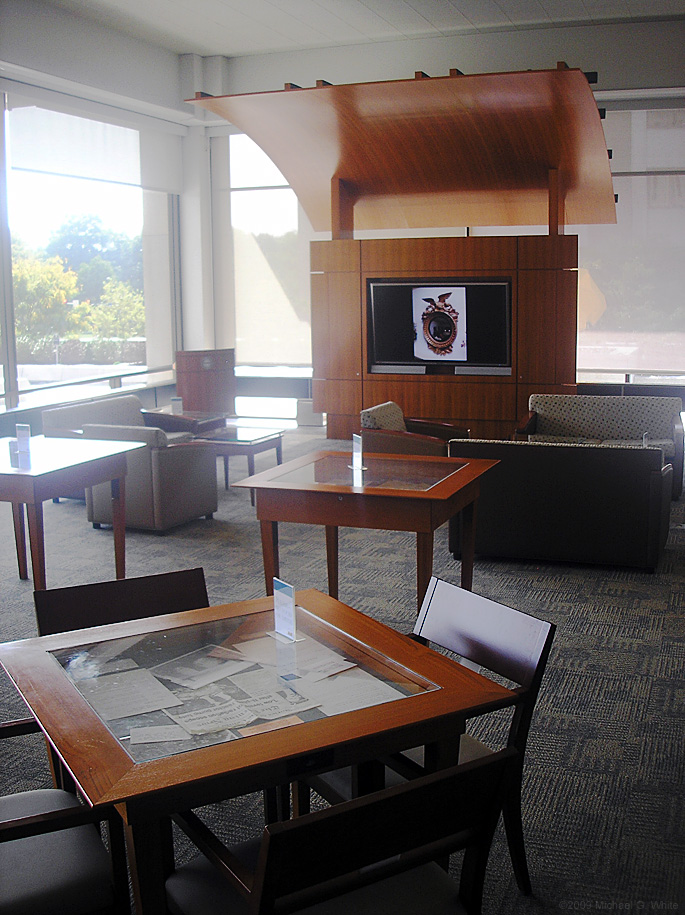
The Dick Thornburgh Room in Hillman Library showcases artifacts from the Thornburgh Archives Collection housed at the University of Pittsburgh.

After his 25 years in public service, Thornburgh re-entered private legal practice returning to K&L Gates, the law firm he originally joined in 1959. In 2002, the U.S. Bankruptcy Court in the Southern District of New York appointed him as an examiner in the WorldCom bankruptcy proceedings. His report to the court included damning criticism of Arthur Andersen, WorldCom's accounting firm, and banking giant Citigroup. The report concluded that the two companies aided WorldCom executives in committing fraud.

In 2004, Thornburgh was asked by CBS to undertake an independent investigation of the so-called Rathergate controversy with former Associated Press CEO, Lou Boccardi. Following the investigation and report, Dan Rather relinquished his anchor position on the "CBS Evening News." Then in October 2005 Thornburgh was asked to represent controversial Democratic Pennsylvania politician and nationally renowned forensic pathologist Dr. Cyril Wecht, who was then serving as Coroner of Allegheny County. The federal grand jury in Pittsburgh had returned an 84-count felony indictment against Dr. Wecht. Ultimately all charges were dismissed after 3 1/2 years, on May 14, 2009.

In February 2013, Thornburgh released a report criticizing the conclusions of Louis Freeh about the Penn State child sex abuse scandal involving Jerry Sandusky. Thornburgh was hired by the family of the late coach Joe Paterno to conduct an independent review of the Freeh report.

Thornburgh also served as a consultant to the United Nations, the World Bank and the Inter-American Development Bank on efforts to battle fraud and corruption.

Thornburgh, a long-time supporter of self-determination, authored "Puerto Rico's Future: A Time to Decide" in 2007, in which he calls for immediate change in the island's territorial/commonwealth status. He describes it as a vestige of colonialism. He concedes, however, that change is difficult because equal segments of Puerto Ricans desire statehood or continuation of the status quo. The book is based in part on ongoing research he has done regarding Puerto Rico's vexing political status problem since he testified as attorney general on behalf of the first Bush administration on the issue before the Energy and Natural Resources Committee of the United States Senate in 1991 and for an amicus curiae brief he filed in a Puerto Rico voting rights case before the U.S. Court of Appeals for the First Circuit.

Throughout his career, Thornburgh visited over 40 countries and met with leaders from Canada, Mexico, Europe, Africa, the Middle East, Russia, Ukraine, Japan, China, Taiwan, Korea, India, Cambodia, Australia, New Zealand and Central and South America. He served as an observer to the Russian Federation's first legislative (1993) and presidential (1996) elections. He was a former member of the Council on Foreign Relations.

The K&L Gates site includes nearly 50 published articles and white papers by Thornburgh; they serve as a documentation of his career between 2001 and 2011.

Thornburgh died at a retirement community in Verona, Pennsylvania, on December 31, 2020, at age 88.

=== Dick Thornburgh Papers ===
The Dick Thornburgh Papers were donated to the University of Pittsburgh in 1998. The collection is housed in the university's Hillman Library, where it is showcased in a themed reading room. The university also established the Dick Thornburgh Forum in Law and Public Policy in his honor.

In April 2019, Thornburgh announced he was retiring from K&L Gates. The announcement came 60 years after Thornburgh first joined the firm.

== Publications ==
- Puerto Rico's Future: A Time to Decide, Center for Strategic and International Studies Press, 2007, ISBN 978-0-89206-494-6
- Where the Evidence Leads, autobiography by Dick Thornburgh, University of Pittsburgh Press, 2007, ISBN 978-0-8229-6112-3 online

Party political offices
Preceded by Drew Lewis	Republican nominee Governor of Pennsylvania; 1978, 1982	Succeeded by William Scranton
Preceded by Victor G. Atiyeh	Chair of the Republican Governors Association; 1984–1985	Succeeded by John H. Sununu
Preceded by John Heinz	Republican nominee for U.S. Senator from Pennsylvania (Class 1); 1991	Succeeded by Rick Santorum
Political offices
Preceded by Milton Shapp	Governor of Pennsylvania; 1979–1987	Succeeded by Bob Casey
Legal offices
Preceded by Gustave Diamond	United States Attorney for the Western District of Pennsylvania; 1969–1975	Succeeded by Blair Griffith
Preceded by Henry E. Petersen	United States Assistant Attorney General for the Criminal Division; 1975–1977	Succeeded by Benjamin Civiletti
Preceded by Harold R. Tyler Jr.	United States Deputy Attorney General; Acting; 1977	Succeeded by Peter F. Flaherty
Preceded by Harold R. Tyler Jr. Acting	United States Attorney General; Acting; 1977	Succeeded by Griffin Bell
Preceded by Edwin Meese	United States Attorney General; 1988–1991	Succeeded by William P. Barr
