= Stephen S. Trott =

American judge (born 1939)

Stephen Trott
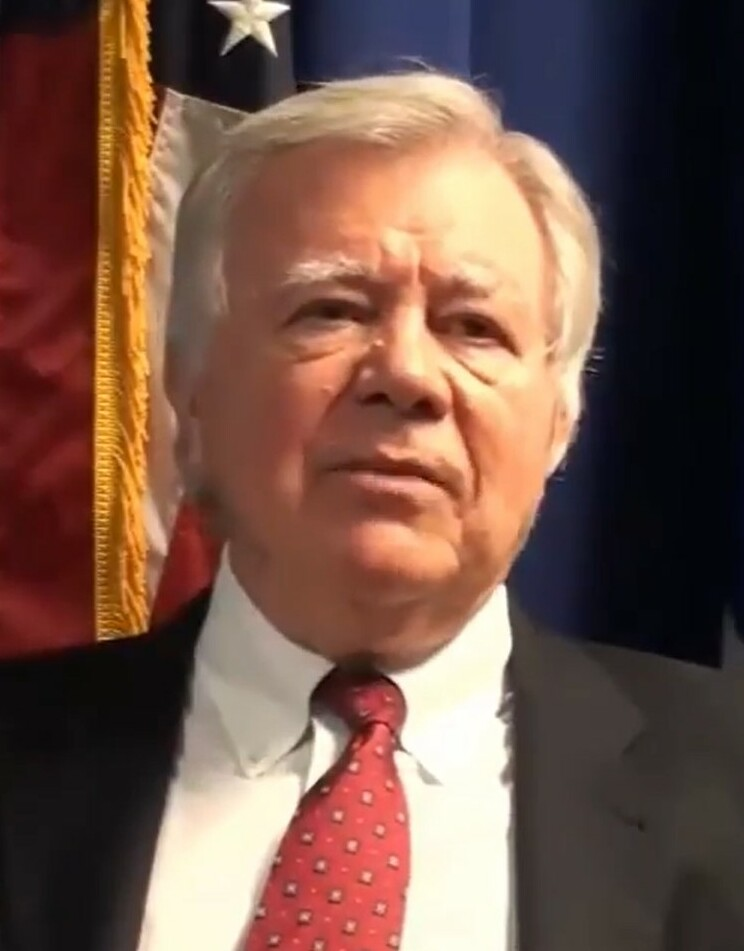
- Trott in 2017

Senior Judge of the United States Court of Appeals for the Ninth Circuit
- Incumbent
- Assumed office December 31, 2004

Judge of the United States Court of Appeals for the Ninth Circuit
- In office March 25, 1988 – December 31, 2004
- Appointed by: Ronald Reagan
- Preceded by: Joseph Tyree Sneed III
- Succeeded by: John B. Owens

United States Associate Attorney General
- In office 1986–1988
- President: Ronald Reagan
- Preceded by: Arnold Burns
- Succeeded by: Frank Keating

United States Assistant Attorney General for the Criminal Division
- In office 1983–1986
- President: Ronald Reagan
- Preceded by: D. Lowell Jensen
- Succeeded by: Bill Weld

United States Attorney for the Central District of California
- In office 1981–1983
- President: Ronald Reagan
- Preceded by: Andrea Ordin
- Succeeded by: Robert C. Bonner

Personal details
- Born: Stephen Spangler Trott; December 12, 1939 (age 86) Glen Ridge, New Jersey, U.S.
- Party: Republican
- Education: Wesleyan University (BA); Harvard University (LLB)

Stephen Spangler Trott (born December 12, 1939) is an inactive Senior United States circuit judge of the United States Court of Appeals for the Ninth Circuit,

== Education and career ==
Born in Glen Ridge, New Jersey, Trott received a Bachelor of Arts degree from Wesleyan University in 1962. As a freshman at Wesleyan, Trott was an early member of the folk music group The Highwaymen. They had a number one hit in the American charts with "Michael, Row the Boat Ashore" in 1960.

He received a Bachelor of Laws from Harvard Law School in 1965. He was a deputy district attorney for Los Angeles County, California from 1966 to 1981 and the chief deputy district attorney from 1975 to 1979. He was the United States Attorney for the Central District of California from 1981 to 1983. He served as Assistant Attorney General for the United States Department of Justice Criminal Division from 1983 to 1986, and Associate Attorney General from 1986 to 1988.

== Federal judicial service ==
Trott was nominated by President Ronald Reagan on August 7, 1987, to a seat on the United States Court of Appeals for the Ninth Circuit vacated by Judge Joseph Tyree Sneed III. "He reportedly turned down the opportunity to be nominated for FBI director, preferring the Ninth Circuit vacancy instead." He was confirmed by the United States Senate on March 24, 1988, and received commission on March 25, 1988. He assumed senior status on December 31, 2004, and inactive senior status in December 2020.

Legal offices
Preceded by Andrea Ordin	United States Attorney for the Central District of California; 1981–1983	Succeeded by Robert C. Bonner
Preceded by D. Lowell Jensen	United States Assistant Attorney General for the Criminal Division; 1983–1986	Succeeded by Bill Weld
Preceded by Arnold Burns	United States Associate Attorney General; 1986–1988	Succeeded by Frank Keating
Preceded by Joseph Tyree Sneed III	Judge of the United States Court of Appeals for the Ninth Circuit; 1988–2004	Succeeded by John B. Owens
