= Benjamin Civiletti =

United States Attorney General (1935–2022)

Ben Civiletti
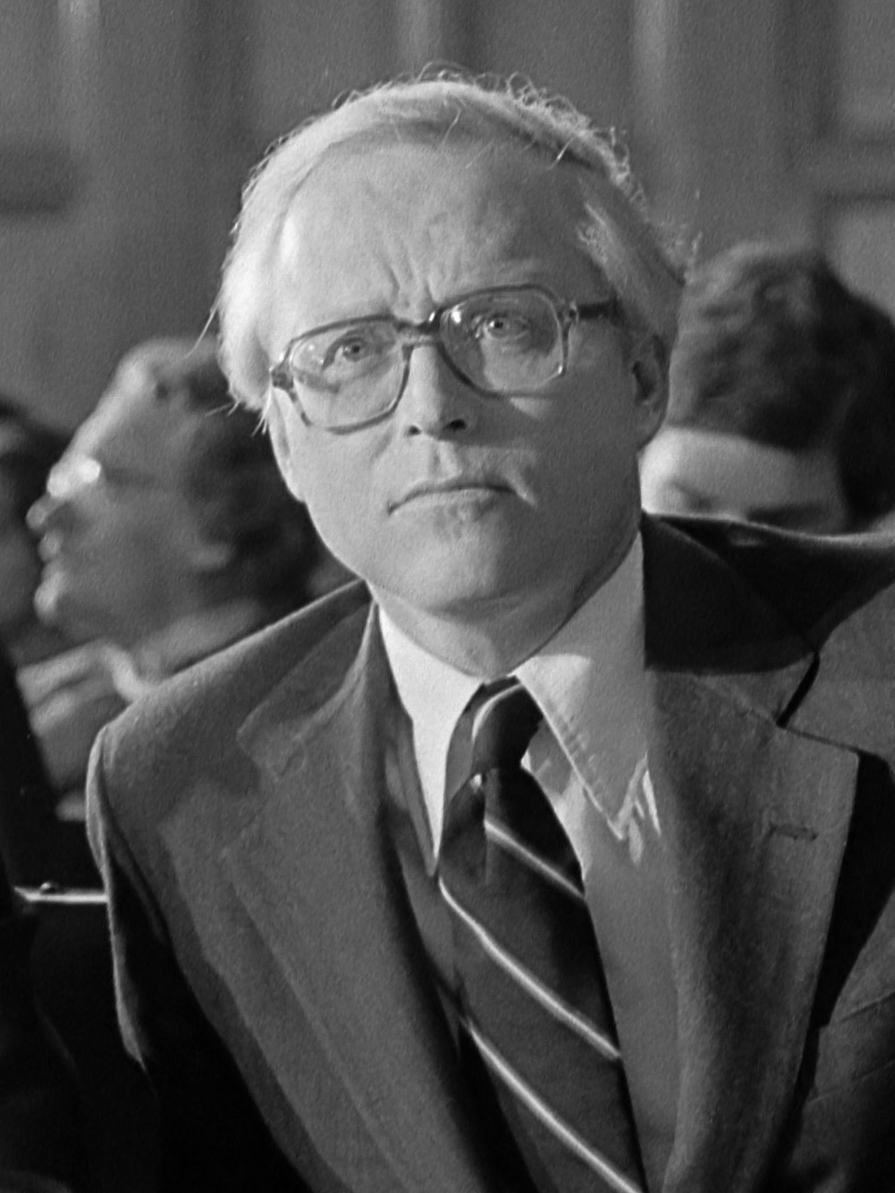
- Civiletti in 1979

73rd United States Attorney General
- In office August 16, 1979 – January 19, 1981
- President: Jimmy Carter
- Deputy: Charles Ruff (acting); Charles Byron Renfrew
- Preceded by: Griffin Bell
- Succeeded by: William French Smith

17th United States Deputy Attorney General
- In office May 16, 1978 – August 16, 1979
- President: Jimmy Carter
- Preceded by: Peter F. Flaherty
- Succeeded by: Charles Byron Renfrew

United States Assistant Attorney General for the Criminal Division
- In office March 12, 1977 – May 16, 1978
- President: Jimmy Carter
- Preceded by: Dick Thornburgh
- Succeeded by: Philip Heymann

Personal details
- Born: Benjamin Richard Civiletti; July 17, 1935 Peekskill, New York, U.S.
- Died: October 16, 2022 (aged 87) Lutherville, Maryland, U.S.
- Party: Democratic
- Spouse: Gaile Lundgren (m. 1958)
- Children: 3
- Education: Johns Hopkins University (AB); Columbia University; University of Maryland, Baltimore (LLB)

Benjamin Richard Civiletti (July 17, 1935 – October 16, 2022) was an American lawyer who served as the 73rd United States Attorney General during the last year and a half of the Carter administration, from 1979 to 1981. The first Italian American to lead the U.S. Department of Justice, he previously served as the Deputy Attorney General and Assistant Attorney General for the Criminal Division. Later he was a senior partner in the Baltimore-based law firm of Venable LLP (known until 2003 as Venable, Baetjer & Howard). He specialized in commercial litigation and internal investigations working at Venable LLP.

Beginning in 2001, Civiletti was one of the three members of the Independent Review Board, a board that the International Brotherhood of Teamsters union must answer to when allegations of corruption or organized crime infiltration surface under the terms of a consent decree issued in 1989 by a federal district court judgment.

== Early life and career ==
Civiletti was born in Peekskill, New York. His father, Benjamin, worked as a grocery store manager; his mother was Virginia (Muller). Civiletti was raised in nearby Lake Mahopac and Shrub Oak and attended the Washington Irving High School which was in Tarrytown. He played football, basketball, and lacrosse at Johns Hopkins University receiving a Bachelor of Arts in psychology in 1957. He attended Columbia Law School and earned a Bachelor of Laws degree from the University of Maryland School of Law in Baltimore.

Civiletti was a law clerk for W. Calvin Chesnut, a judge on the U.S. District Court for the District of Maryland. He then became an assistant United States Attorney in Baltimore a year after graduating from law school, serving in that capacity until 1964.

== Career ==
Griffin Bell noticed Civiletti's accomplishments while Bell was forming the Justice Department leadership team for the presidency of Jimmy Carter by his confidant, Charles Kirbo, a law partner of Bell's who had once been involved in a case with Civiletti. In February 1977, Carter nominated Civletti to succeed Richard Thornburgh as United States Assistant Attorney General in charge of the Criminal Division. In 1978, he was nominated to become the Deputy Attorney General.

Civiletti was serving as the Deputy Attorney General when Griffin Bell resigned as Attorney General of the United States. He was appointed to the Justice Department's top position on July 19, 1979, becoming the first Italian American to assume the role of attorney general. Although Bell voluntarily resigned, his resignation happened during a major cabinet shakeup in the Carter administration. Secretary of Health, Education, and Welfare Joseph A. Califano, Jr. and Secretary of the Treasury W. Michael Blumenthal also resigned on the same day. Transportation Secretary Brock Adams resigned soon afterwards.

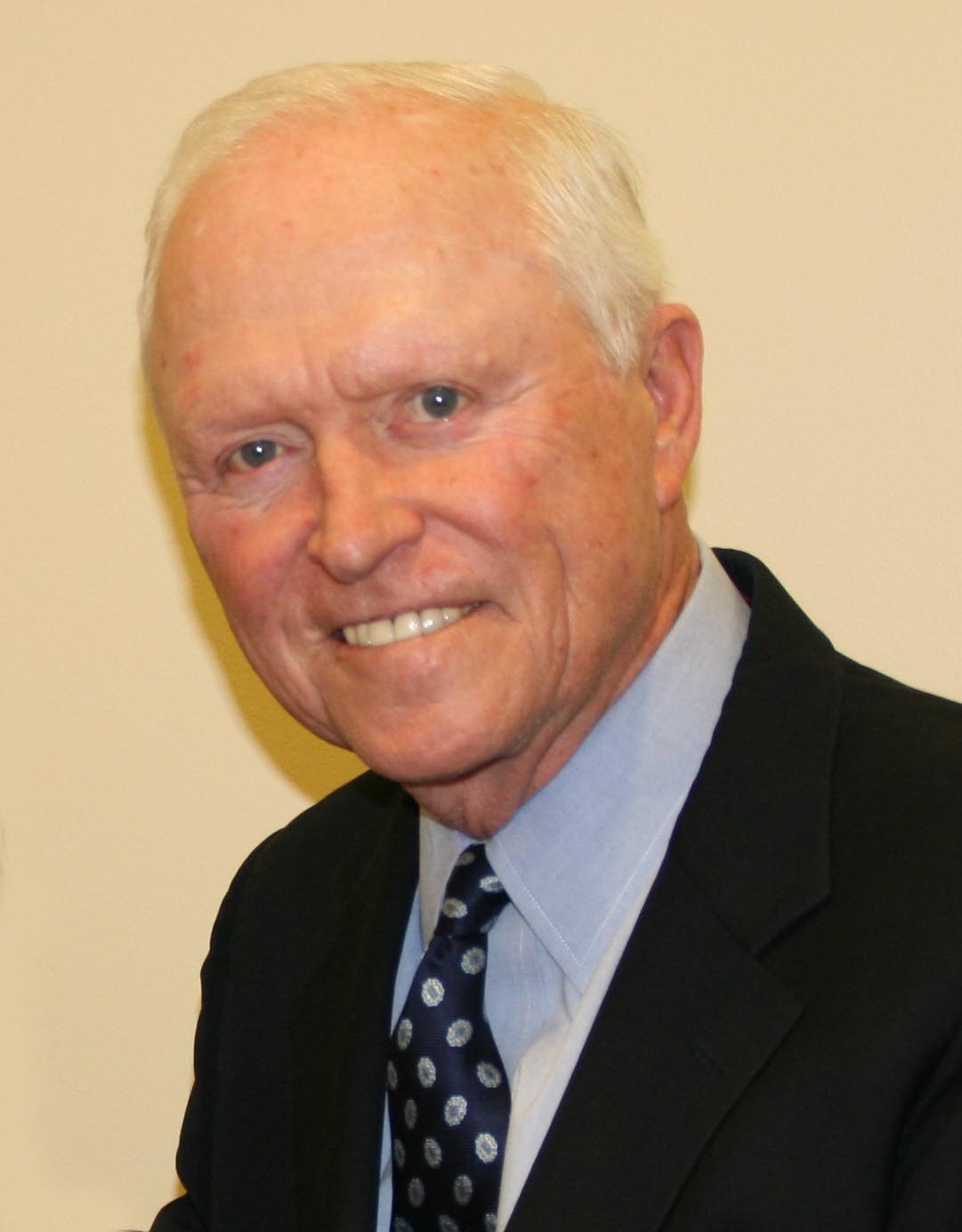
Benjamin Civiletti (2009)

As the US Attorney General, Civiletti argued several important cases on behalf of the U.S. government. Notably he argued before the International Court of Justice on behalf of Americans being held captive in Iran during the Iran hostage crisis, in the Case Concerning United States Diplomatic and Consular Staff in Tehran. He also argued before the Supreme Court in support of the government's right to denaturalize Nazi war criminals in Fedorenko v. United States.

Opinions which were written by Civiletti while he was attorney general, interpreted the United States Constitution and U.S. federal law to say that government cannot operate until Congress agrees on a spending bill. They set the stage for partial government shutdowns in later years.

While serving as Attorney General, Civiletti recommended, and President Carter agreed to a commutation of sentences to time served for four unrepentant Puerto Rican nationalists convicted of shooting five U.S. Congressmen at the U.S. Capitol. The commutations happened in spite of public opposition from the Governor of Puerto Rico Carlos Romero Barceló who believed it would encourage more terrorism.

On July 10, 2008, Maryland Governor Martin O'Malley announced that Civiletti would serve as the chairman of the Maryland Commission on Capital Punishment which was set up to study the application of capital punishment in Maryland and make a recommendation on the abolition of the death penalty in Maryland. On November 12, 2008, the commission voted 13–7 with Civiletti voting with the majority, to recommend that the Maryland General Assembly abolish capital punishment in the state.

== Personal life ==
Civiletti married Gaile L. Lundgren in 1958. They had three children: Benjamin H., Andrew S., and Lynne T. Civiletti.

Civiletti died on October 16, 2022, at home in Lutherville, Maryland. He was 87 and suffered from Parkinson's disease prior to his death.

== Recognition ==
- 1980, Golden Plate Award of the American Academy of Achievement
- 2009, American Lawyer's Lifetime Achievement Award
- 2012, Lifetime Achievement Award by the Equal Justice Council

Legal offices
Preceded by Peter F. Flaherty	U.S. Deputy Attorney General; Served under: Jimmy Carter; 1978–1979	Succeeded by Charles B. Renfrew
Preceded by Griffin B. Bell	U.S. Attorney General; Served under: Jimmy Carter; 1979–1981	Succeeded by William French Smith
