= Charles Byron Renfrew =

American judge

United States Attorney General Acting
- In office January 20, 1981 – January 23, 1981
- President: Jimmy Carter; Ronald Reagan
- Deputy: Vacant
- Preceded by: Benjamin Civiletti
- Succeeded by: William French Smith

18th United States Deputy Attorney General
- In office February 27, 1980 – January 19, 1981
- President: Jimmy Carter
- Preceded by: Benjamin Civiletti
- Succeeded by: Edward C. Schmults

Judge of the United States District Court for the Northern District of California
- In office December 9, 1971 – February 27, 1980
- Appointed by: Richard Nixon
- Preceded by: Gerald Sanford Levin
- Succeeded by: Eugene F. Lynch

Personal details
- Born: Charles Byron Renfrew; October 31, 1928 Detroit, Michigan, U.S.
- Died: December 14, 2017 (aged 89)
- Party: Democratic
- Education: Princeton University (A.B.); University of Michigan Law School (J.D.)

Charles Byron Renfrew (October 31, 1928 – December 14, 2017) was a United States district judge of the United States District Court for the Northern District of California. Renfrew also served as the 18th United States Deputy Attorney General from February 27, 1980, until the end of the day on January 19, 1981, and as acting United States Attorney General in his capacity as United States Deputy Attorney General, pursuant to 28 U.S.C. § 508, from the beginning of the day on January 20, 1981, following the resignation of Benjamin Civiletti as the 73rd United States Attorney General at the end of the day on January 19, 1981, until William French Smith assumed office as the 74th United States Attorney General on January 23, 1981.

== Education and career ==
Renfrew was born in Detroit, Michigan. He enlisted in the United States Navy after high school in the aftermath of World War II, from 1946 to 1948. He then received an Artium Baccalaureus degree from Princeton University in 1952. He served in the United States Army from 1952 to 1953 and became a first lieutenant. He was a forward observer in Korea during the Korean War. He received a Juris Doctor from the University of Michigan Law School in 1956, thereafter entering private practice in San Francisco, California, from 1956 to 1972.

== Federal Judicial Service ==
On November 29, 1971, Renfrew was nominated by President Richard Nixon to a seat on the United States District Court for the Northern District of California vacated by Judge Gerald Sanford Levin. Renfrew was confirmed by the United States Senate on December 2, 1971, and received his commission on December 9, 1971. Renfrew served in that capacity until his resignation on February 27, 1980.

== Post Judicial Service ==
Following his resignation from the federal bench, he served as United States Deputy Attorney General until 1981. Renfrew was thereafter in private practice in San Francisco from 1981 to 1982. He was a vice president and counsel of the Chevron Corporation in San Francisco from 1983 to 1993. He returned to private practice in San Francisco in 1994. In 2013, he was listed as a NAFTA adjudicator. He died of heart failure on December 14, 2017.

== Sources ==
Legal offices
Preceded by Gerald Sanford Levin	Judge of the United States District Court for the Northern District of California; 1971–1980	Succeeded by Eugene F. Lynch
Preceded by Benjamin Civiletti	United States Deputy Attorney General; 1980–1981	Succeeded by Edward C. Schmults
Preceded by Benjamin Civiletti	United States Attorney General; Acting; 1981	Succeeded by William French Smith
