= Dick Thornburgh Papers =

Archives of a governorship of Pennsylvania (1980s)

The Dick Thornburgh Papers are the collection of materials related to Dick Thornburgh's eight years as Governor of Pennsylvania. The Papers are housed in the Archives Service Center, University of Pittsburgh Library System, University of Pittsburgh in Pittsburgh, Pennsylvania (USA). The collection contains digitized content that is accessible online at no cost. Not all the content is digitized but is available by request. Copies of materials are provided at a small cost to cover the cost of making the copies and mailing them.

== History ==
The collection was acquired through Dick Thornburgh on February 27, 1998, and was processed by archivists with funding by a grant by the Commonwealth of Pennsylvania in 2002. The University of Pittsburgh received the grant to fund the work needed to digitize the papers. The grant supported the formation of online-accessible to be available to researchers. Processing the papers involved encoding of the 37,000 pages of text, hundreds of photographs, and many audio and video recordings.

== Scope ==
=== Three Mile Island accident ===
Records pertaining to the Three Mile Island accident are part of the collection. Other documentation regarding the accident are housed in the Pennsylvania State Archives.

=== Videos ===
Videos in the collection number 547 and span 1978–1991. Chronologically, they were recorded beginning with Thornburgh's campaign for governor in 1978 to his campaign for U.S. Senate in 1991. Over 70 videos are available for streaming from the collection.

=== News releases ===
News releases related to events are also contained in the collection.
