= John B. Owens =

American judge (born 1971)

John Owens
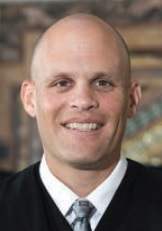

Judge of the United States Court of Appeals for the Ninth Circuit
- Incumbent
- Assumed office April 2, 2014
- Appointed by: Barack Obama
- Preceded by: Stephen S. Trott

Personal details
- Born: John Byron Owens; 1971 (age 54–55) Washington, D.C., U.S.
- Education: University of California, Berkeley (BA); Stanford University (JD)

John Byron Owens (born 1971) is an American judge and lawyer who serves as a United States circuit judge of the United States Court of Appeals for the Ninth Circuit.

== Early life and education ==
Owens was born in Washington, D.C. in 1971, and grew up in Northern California. He is the grandson of Harold Agnew.

Owens graduated from the University of California, Berkeley in 1993 with a Bachelor of Arts with high distinction. While an undergraduate, Owens worked as a marketing assistant for the Golden State Warriors. He then attended Stanford Law School, where he was an editor of the Stanford Law Review. He graduated in 1996 ranked first in his class with a Juris Doctor degree with distinction.

== Career ==
After law school, Owens was a law clerk for Judge J. Clifford Wallace of the United States Court of Appeals for the Ninth Circuit from 1996 to 1997 and for Justice Ruth Bader Ginsburg of the U.S. Supreme Court from 1997 to 1998. Owens then worked as a trial attorney for the United States Department of Justice's Office of Consumer Litigation. From 2000 until 2001, he served as a litigation associate at the law firm O'Melveny & Myers in Washington, D.C. From 2001 until 2004, he served in the U.S. Attorney's Office for the Central District of California as an Assistant United States Attorney. In 2004, he transferred to the U.S. Attorney's Office in the Southern District of California, where he served until 2012, serving first as an Assistant United States Attorney from 2004 until 2008, then as the deputy chief of the major frauds section from 2008 until 2010 and finally as the chief of the criminal division from 2010 until 2011. He has appeared on the television show American Greed.

From January 2012 until April 2014, Owens was a litigation partner in the Los Angeles office of Munger, Tolles & Olson LLP.

=== Federal judicial service ===
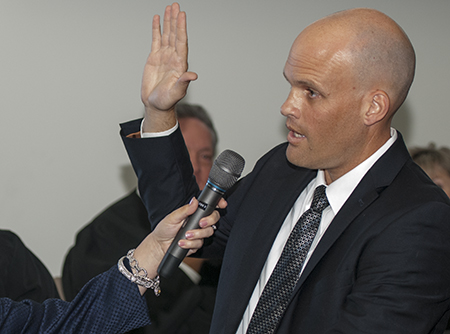
Owens taking oath of office; Being sworn in as circuit judge of the Ninth Circuit (April 25, 2014)

On August 1, 2013, President Barack Obama nominated Owens to a seat on the United States Court of Appeals for the Ninth Circuit. He filled the seat that was vacated by Judge Stephen S. Trott, who assumed senior status on December 31, 2004. On January 16, 2014 his nomination was reported out of committee by a voice vote. On March 26, 2014, Senate Majority Leader Harry Reid filed for cloture on the nomination. On March 27, 2014, the United States Senate invoked cloture on Owens' nomination by a 54–44 vote. On March 31, 2014, Owens’ nomination was confirmed by a 56–43 vote. He received his judicial commission on April 2, 2014. Owens was officially seated and sworn in on April 25, 2014.

== See also ==
- List of law clerks for the sixth seat of the Supreme Court of the United States

Legal offices
Preceded by Stephen S. Trott	Judge of the United States Court of Appeals for the Ninth Circuit; 2014–present	Incumbent
