= Eugene F. Lynch =

American judge (1931–2019)

Senior Judge of the United States District Court for the Northern District of California
- In office March 14, 1997 – July 12, 1997

Judge of the United States District Court for the Northern District of California
- In office March 9, 1982 – March 14, 1997
- Appointed by: Ronald Reagan
- Preceded by: Charles Byron Renfrew
- Succeeded by: Martin Jenkins

Personal details
- Born: December 2, 1931 San Francisco, California
- Died: October 9, 2019 (aged 87) San Francisco, California
- Education: Santa Clara University (B.S.); University of California, Hastings; College of the Law (LL.B.)

Eugene F. Lynch (December 2, 1931 – October 9, 2019) was a United States district judge of the United States District Court for the Northern District of California.

== Education and career ==
Born in San Francisco, California, Lynch received a Bachelor of Science degree from Santa Clara University in 1953 and a Bachelor of Laws from the University of California, Hastings College of the Law in 1958. He was in the United States Army from 1953 to 1955 and became a captain. He was in private practice in San Francisco from 1959 to 1971. He was a judge on the Municipal Court of San Francisco from 1971 to 1974, and a judge on the Superior Court of the City and County of San Francisco from 1974 to 1982.

== Federal judicial service ==
Lynch was nominated by President Ronald Reagan on January 25, 1982, to a seat on the United States District Court for the Northern District of California vacated by Judge Charles Byron Renfrew. He was confirmed by the United States Senate on March 4, 1982, and received his commission on March 9, 1982. He assumed senior status on March 14, 1997. Lynch served in that capacity until his retirement from the federal bench on July 12, 1997.

== Sources ==
Legal offices
Preceded by Charles Byron Renfrew	Judge of the United States District Court for the Northern District of California; 1982–1997	Succeeded by Martin Jenkins
