= Gerald Sanford Levin =

American judge

Judge of the United States District Court for the Northern District of California
- In office July 14, 1969 – June 5, 1971
- Appointed by: Richard Nixon
- Preceded by: Seat established by 80 Stat. 75
- Succeeded by: Charles Byron Renfrew

Personal details
- Born: Gerald Sanford Levin; January 1, 1906 Danville, Illinois
- Died: June 5, 1971 (aged 65)
- Education: University of California, Berkeley (A.B.); UC Berkeley School of Law (LL.B.)

Gerald Sanford Levin (January 1, 1906 – June 5, 1971) was a United States District Judge of the United States District Court for the Northern District of California.

== Education and career ==
Born in Danville, Illinois, Levin received an Artium Baccalaureus degree from the University of California, Berkeley in 1927 and a Bachelor of Laws from the UC Berkeley School of Law in 1930. He entered private practice in California in 1924 and served as a state court judge from 1955 to 1966.

== Federal judicial service ==
On June 13, 1969, Levin was nominated by President Richard Nixon to a new seat on the United States District Court for the Northern District of California created by 80 Stat. 75. He was confirmed by the United States Senate on July 11, 1969, and received his commission on July 14, 1969. Levin's service lasted less than two years, ending with his death on June 5, 1971, at the age of 65.

== See also ==
- List of Jewish American jurists

== Sources ==
Legal offices
Preceded by Seat established by 80 Stat. 75	Judge of the United States District Court for the Northern District of California; 1969–1971	Succeeded by Charles Byron Renfrew
