= Martin Jenkins =

American judge (born 1953)

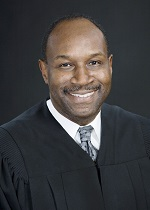

Associate Justice of the California Supreme Court
- In office December 4, 2020 – October 31, 2025
- Appointed by: Gavin Newsom
- Preceded by: Ming W. Chin
- Succeeded by: Vacant

Associate Justice of the California Court of Appeal from the 1st district
- In office April 4, 2008 – January 15, 2019
- Appointed by: Arnold Schwarzenegger
- Preceded by: Joanne Parrilli
- Succeeded by: Teri Jackson

Judge of the United States District Court for the Northern District of California
- In office November 12, 1997 – April 3, 2008
- Appointed by: Bill Clinton
- Preceded by: Eugene F. Lynch
- Succeeded by: Edward M. Chen

Personal details
- Born: Martin Joseph Jenkins; November 12, 1953 (age 72) San Francisco, California, U.S.
- Party: Democratic
- Education: City College of San Francisco (AA); Santa Clara University (BA); University of San Francisco (JD)

Martin Joseph Jenkins (born November 12, 1953) is an American attorney and jurist who served as an associate justice of the Supreme Court of California. He was previously a justice of the California Court of Appeal for the First District, located in San Francisco, and a former United States district judge of the United States District Court for the Northern District of California.

== Early life and education ==
Jenkins was born in San Francisco and raised in the neighborhood of Ingleside. He earned an Associate of Arts degree from City College of San Francisco, then graduated from Santa Clara University with a Bachelor of Arts degree. Jenkins played on the Santa Clara Broncos football team at defensive back. After college, Jenkins briefly played professional football for the Seattle Seahawks of the National Football League. Jenkins then attended the University of San Francisco School of Law, where he earned his Juris Doctor with honors.

== Career ==
Jenkins was a law clerk in the Alameda County District Attorney's Office, California, from 1980 to 1981, and then a deputy district attorney (prosecutor) in that same office from 1981 to 1983. and for the United States Department of Justice in the Civil Rights Division from 1983 to 1985. In 1985, Jenkins moved back to the Bay Area when his mother became ill, then served as in-house counsel for Pacific Bell for four years. He served as the Judicial Appointments Secretary for California Governor Gavin Newsom from January 14, 2019, to December 4, 2020.

=== Judicial service ===
A Democrat, Jenkins was appointed to the Alameda County Municipal Court by Republican Governor George Deukmejian in 1989. In 1992, Republican Governor Pete Wilson appointed him to the Alameda County Superior Court, where he served until 1997.

Jenkins was a United States District Judge of the United States District Court for the Northern District of California. He was nominated by President Bill Clinton on July 24, 1997, to a seat vacated by Eugene F. Lynch. He was confirmed by the United States Senate on November 9, 1997, and received commission on November 12, 1997. His contribution to federal law includes the Jenkins-Laporte Doctrine, which defines the boundary of copyright and contractual rights in the licensing of digital works.

In August 2007, Jenkins asked Republican Governor Arnold Schwarzenegger to consider him for a seat on the California Court of Appeal. On January 25, 2008, Schwarzenegger nominated Jenkins to fill the vacancy on the First District Court of Appeal created by the retirement of Justice Joanne C. Parrilli. Jenkins resigned from the federal bench on April 3 and was confirmed on the state bench on April 4, 2008. He resigned from the state bench in January 2019 to become Governor Gavin Newsom's judicial appointments secretary.

On October 5, 2020, Governor Newsom announced that he would nominate Jenkins to be an associate justice of the Supreme Court of California, replacing Ming Chin, who retired on August 31, 2020. When confirmed, he became the first openly gay justice, the third African American man, and the fifth African American person to serve on the court.

On November 11, 2020, Jenkins was confirmed as an associate justice of the Supreme Court of California. The state's Commission on Judicial Appointments approved his nomination by a 3–0 vote. On December 4, 2020, Jenkins was sworn in as the newest Associate Justice of the California Supreme Court.

In 2022, Jenkins ruled with a majority of the California Supreme Court in ordering University of California, Berkeley to cut its enrollment after a local NIMBY group argued that more students in the college town would have an adverse environmental impact. In the 2022 election, he was retained by California voters to continue to serve as an associate justice with 69.4% of an affirmative vote.

Jenkins retired from the bench at the end of October 2025.

== Personal life ==
Jenkins is Catholic and a member of the St. Thomas More Society of San Francisco. Jenkins is openly gay.

== See also ==
- List of African-American federal judges
- List of African-American jurists
- List of LGBT jurists in the United States
- List of LGBT state supreme court justices in the United States

== Sources ==
Legal offices
Preceded by Eugene F. Lynch	Judge of the United States District Court for the Northern District of California; 1997–2008	Succeeded by Edward M. Chen
Preceded by Ming W. Chin	Associate Justice of the California Supreme Court; 2020–2025	Vacant
