= Henry E. Petersen =

American lawyer

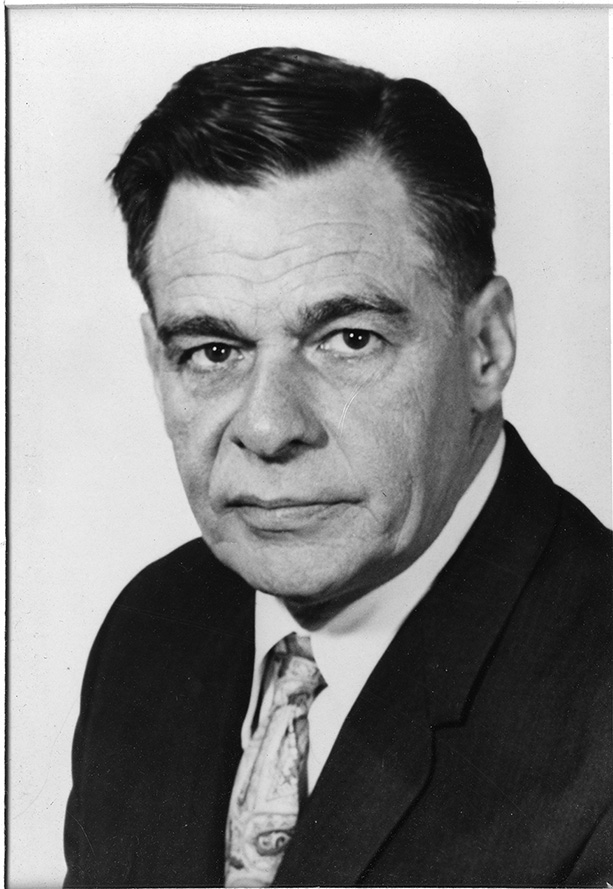

United States Assistant Attorney General for the Criminal Division
- In office 1972–1974
- President: Richard Nixon; Gerald Ford
- Preceded by: Will Wilson
- Succeeded by: Dick Thornburgh

Personal details
- Born: Henry E. Petersen; January 1, 1921 Philadelphia, Pennsylvania, United States
- Died: May 29, 1991 (aged 69–70) Sunderland, Maryland, United States
- Spouse: Jean L. King
- Education: Georgetown University; Catholic University
- Profession: attorney

Henry E. Petersen (January 1, 1921 – May 29, 1991) was an attorney and United States federal government official. He served as Assistant U.S. Attorney General during the Richard Nixon and Gerald Ford administrations. He also engaged in ethically questionable communications with Nixon and his staff, providing inside information about the Watergate investigation prior to the appointment of the Special Prosecutor.

== Personal ==
Petersen was born in Philadelphia, Pennsylvania in 1921 and grew up in the Washington, D.C. area. Petersen served in the United States Marine Corps in the South Pacific during World War II. After returning, Petersen studied at Georgetown University and received his law degree from the Catholic University of America.

Petersen died of emphysema in Sunderland, Maryland in 1991 at age 70.

== Involvement in the Watergate scandal ==
In his capacity as the Assistant Attorney General for the Criminal Division of the United States Department of Justice, Petersen oversaw the conduct of the Watergate investigation by federal prosecutors in the U.S Attorneys Office in Washington D.C. When Wright Patman announced that the House Banking Committee would be investigating Watergate, White House Counsel John Dean persuaded Petersen to ask the members of the House Banking Committee not to issue subpoenas for individuals involved in the Watergate scandal (including Dean himself) because it might jeopardise potential criminal trials. On October 2, 1972, at the behest of Dean, Petersen sent a letter to the members of the Committee asking that they not issue subpoenas, and the following day the Committee voted not to hold hearings on Watergate.

Particularly critical of Petersen in House Banking Committee meetings was Rep. Henry S. Reuss (D-Wis.). Early in 1973, tipped off by a Wall Street Journal reporter that Petersen was rumored to be meeting daily with the president, Reuss's legislative assistant James H. Rathlesberger obtained Petersen's confirmation in a telephone interview that same day. Petersen claimed it was not inappropriate because he was only sharing one category of evidence he deemed non-problematic. Former Attorney General Ramsey Clark that afternoon informed Rathlesberger in another telephone interview "that is absolutely wrong. I would never do that." But Reuss, a Harvard-trained lawyer and former prosecutor, told Rathlesberger by phone late that afternoon from Wisconsin: "I disagree with Ramsey" and that he saw nothing wrong and chose not to make a press statement.

Sometime in late October 1972, Petersen informed Dean that Mark Felt was leaking information to the press. Felt would later come to be described in Bob Woodward and Carl Bernstein's bestselling book All the President's Men as "Deep Throat," whose identity would remain a mystery until 2005. Petersen did not divulge who told him this, however he explained that it was an attorney who was employed by one of the newspaper publications that Felt was leaking to. Dean reported this information back to the White House. When Chief of Staff H.R Haldeman reported the information to President Nixon, Haldeman advised Nixon not to fire Felt as "He knows everything that's to be known in the FBI." Author Max Holland speculates that it was Roswell Gilpatric who told Petersen that it was Felt who was leaking to Time magazine.

In April 1973, John Dean decided to cooperate with federal prosecutors in the Watergate investigation. Dean came to an agreement with lead prosecutor Earl Silbert that he would not report the information Dean gave back to Petersen (Silbert's superior) as he knew Petersen would inform the White House. When Dean informed Silbert that Nixon's two closest advisors, H.R Haldeman and John Ehrlichman were involved in an obstruction of justice, Silbert felt he had to inform Petersen of the situation. On April 15, 1973, Attorney General Richard Kleindienst and Petersen informed Nixon that Dean was cooperating and that the Justice Department was building a criminal case against Haldeman and Ehrlichman. Haldeman and Ehrlichman resigned fifteen days later while Dean was fired.

On April 17, 1973, Petersen told President Nixon that the Justice Department was investigating the break-in at Daniel Ellsberg's psychiatrist office by the White House Plumbers. Nixon ordered Petersen not to investigate the issue because "that was a national security matter." Petersen relayed this order back to Earl Silbert. Several days later however, Petersen and Kleindienst persuaded Nixon that the Justice Department needed to disclose the matter to the court in Daniel Ellsberg's criminal case.

Throughout April 1973, Nixon would use Petersen to extract important grand jury information about the Watergate case before divulging that information to subjects of the investigation. For example, on April 16, 1973, Petersen informed Nixon that Fred LaRue, a figure in the Watergate cover-up was cooperating with the grand jury. Nixon subsequently instructed Haldeman to inform Herb Kalmbach, another figure in the cover-up that LaRue was "talking freely." The conversations with Petersen would later be cited in the Articles of Impeachment against Richard Nixon, accusing the President of "disseminating information received from officers of the Department of Justice of the United States to subjects of investigations conducted by lawfully authorized investigative officers and employees of the United States, for the purpose of aiding and assisting such subjects in their attempts to avoid criminal liability."

Due to his role in the Watergate scandal, Petersen testified before the Senate Watergate Committee on August 7, 1973.

Legal offices
Preceded by Will Wilson	United States Assistant Attorney General for the Criminal Division; 1972–1974	Succeeded by Dick Thornburgh
