= Arnold Burns =

American lawyer

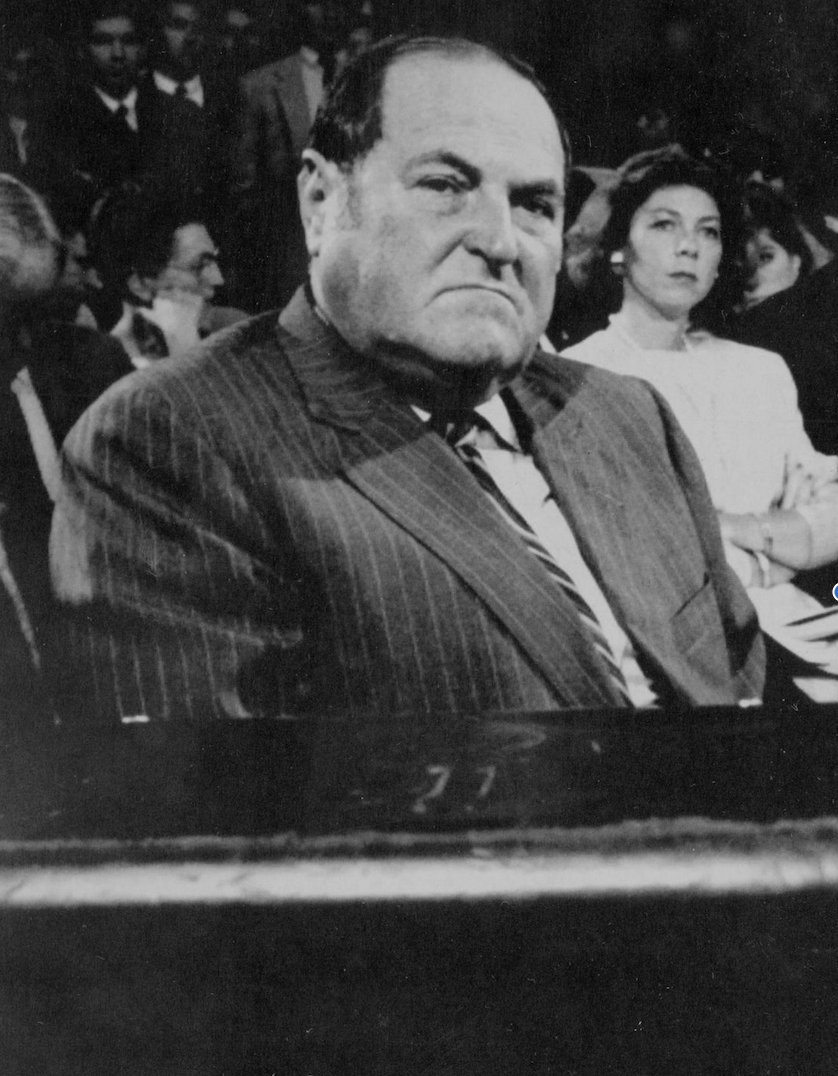

22nd United States Deputy Attorney General
- In office July 1986 – July 1988
- President: Ronald Reagan
- Preceded by: D. Lowell Jensen
- Succeeded by: Harold G. Christensen

United States Associate Attorney General
- In office 1985–1986
- President: Ronald Reagan
- Preceded by: D. Lowell Jensen
- Succeeded by: Stephen S. Trott

Personal details
- Born: Arnold Irwin Burns; April 14, 1930 Brooklyn, New York City, New York
- Died: October 1, 2013 (aged 83) Manhattan, New York City, New York
- Spouse: Felice Burns
- Education: Union College (B.A); Cornell Law School (J.D.)

Arnold Irwin Burns (April 14, 1930 – October 1, 2013) was an American lawyer. He served as the United States Deputy Attorney General from 1986 to 1988 under President Ronald Reagan and U.S. Attorney General Edwin Meese. In March 1988, Burns, together with the head of the U.S. Justice Department's criminal division William Weld and four aides, resigned from office in protest of what they viewed as improper conduct by Attorney General Meese, including personal financial indiscretions. In July 1988, Burns and Weld jointly testified before the U.S. Congress in support of a potential prosecution of Meese following an investigation by a special prosecutor, who had declined to file charges. Meese resigned from office later in July 1988, shortly after Burns and Weld appeared before Congress.

== Life and career ==
Burns was born in Brooklyn, New York, on April 14, 1930. His mother, Rose Burns, was a homemaker, while his father, Herman Burns, owned a jewelry store. He received his bachelor's degree in political science from Union College in 1950 and a J.D. degree from Cornell Law School in 1953. He later served as the Chairman of Union College's Board of Trustees from 1982 to 1986.

Burns worked for a private law firm after law school. He then co-founded Burns Summit Rovins & Feldesman, where he specialized in corporate law for more than twenty-five years. He was appointed as United States Associate Attorney General in late 1985 after Attorney General Meese's first choice for the position was rejected by the Senate Judiciary Committee. In July 1986, Burns was appointed United States Deputy Attorney General, the second highest ranking position in the Justice Department, a position he held until his resignation in protest of Meese's conduct in 1988.

Burns joined Proskauer Rose Goetz & Mendelsohn for approximately a decade after leaving the Justice Department. He also published a memoir, Preparing to Be Lucky, as well as two joke books.

In 1993, Burns and a Canadian lawyer, Yves Fortier, were asked to investigate a controversy concerning the Hockey Hall of Fame. Gill Stein, the outgoing president of the National Hockey League, had been elected to membership in the Hall of Fame, but rumours arose that he had placed undue influence on the directors of the Hall to ensure his election. Gary Bettman, the commissioner of the National Hockey League, retained Burns and Fortier, Canada's former ambassador to the United Nations, to investigate the allegations. They concluded that Stein had "improperly manipulated the process" and "created the false appearance and illusion" that the owner of the Los Angeles Kings, Bruce McNall, had put Stein's name forward. Stein denied those conclusions, but ultimately he withdrew his name from the Hall of Fame.

Arnold Burns died from cardiac arrest and complications of Parkinson's disease in Manhattan, New York City, on October 1, 2013, at the age of 83. He was survived by his wife of 62 years, Felice Bernstein, and two children, Douglas Burns and Linda Burns.
