= James W. Moorman =

American attorney

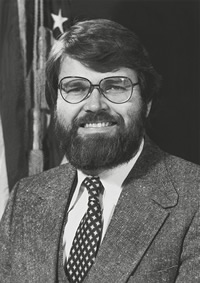

24th United States Assistant Attorney General for the Environment and Natural Resources
- In office 1977–1981
- President: Jimmy Carter
- Preceded by: Peter Taft
- Succeeded by: Carol E. Dinkins

Personal details
- Born: November 22, 1937; Pittsburgh, Pennsylvania
- Died: April 23, 2024 (aged 86); Washington, D.C.
- Political party: Democratic

James W. Moorman (November 22, 1937 – April 23, 2024) was an American attorney who served as the United States Assistant Attorney General for the Environment and Natural Resources from 1977 to 1981.

He died on April 23, 2024, in Washington, D.C. at age 86.
