= Rita F. Lin =

American federal judge (born 1978)

Rita Lin
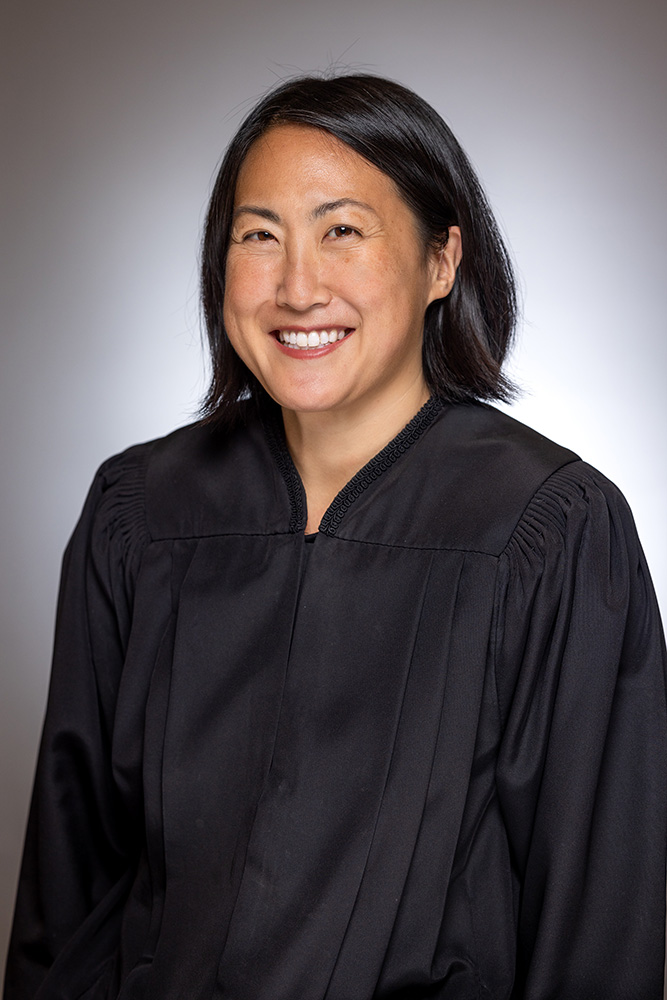

Judge of the United States District Court for the Northern District of California
- Incumbent
- Assumed office October 4, 2023
- Appointed by: Joe Biden
- Preceded by: Edward M. Chen

Judge of the San Francisco County Superior Court
- In office June 27, 2018 – October 4, 2023
- Appointed by: Jerry Brown
- Preceded by: Ksenia Tsenin
- Succeeded by: Brian J. Stretch

Personal details
- Born: Rita Faye Lin; 1978 (age 47–48) Oakland, California, U.S.
- Party: Democratic
- Education: Harvard University (BA, JD)

Rita Faye Lin (born 1978) is an American lawyer and jurist serving as a U.S. district judge of the U.S. District Court for the Northern District of California. She was appointed in 2023 by President Joe Biden. She served as a California state court judge on the San Francisco County Superior Court from 2018 to 2023.

== Early life and education ==
Lin was born in 1978 in Oakland, California, to a Taiwanese American family. She earned a Bachelor of Arts, magna cum laude, from Harvard University in 2000 and a Juris Doctor from Harvard Law School in 2003.

== Career ==
From 2003 to 2004, Lin served as a law clerk for Judge Sandra Lynch of the United States Court of Appeals for the First Circuit. She joined Morrison & Foerster in San Francisco as an associate in 2004 and later became a partner at the firm. From 2014 to 2018, she served as an assistant United States attorney for the Northern District of California. She was appointed to serve as a judge of the San Francisco County Superior Court by Governor Jerry Brown in 2018. Lin was an adjunct professor of law at the University of California, Hastings College of the Law, where in the fall 2021 semester she co-taught a course on criminal procedure.

Lin worked pro bono as co-counsel against the Defense of Marriage Act, which was declared unconstitutional on February 22, 2012, in U.S. District Court in California.

=== Federal judicial service ===
On July 29, 2022, President Joe Biden announced his intent to nominate Lin to serve as a United States district judge of the United States District Court for the Northern District of California. On August 1, 2022, her nomination was sent to the Senate. President Biden nominated Lin to the seat vacated by Judge Edward M. Chen, who assumed senior status on May 17, 2022. On November 30, 2022, a hearing on her nomination was held before the Senate Judiciary Committee.

On January 3, 2023, her nomination was returned to the President under Rule XXXI, Paragraph 6 of the United States Senate. She was renominated on January 23, 2023. On February 9, 2023, her nomination was reported out of committee by a 12–9 vote. On September 19, 2023, the Senate invoked cloture on her nomination by a 52–45 vote. Later that day, her nomination was confirmed by a 52–45 vote. She received her judicial commission on October 4, 2023. Lin is the second Asian Pacific American woman—and first Chinese American woman—to serve on the U.S. District Court for the Northern District of California.

== Personal life ==
Lin has a hearing disability being deaf in her right ear and partially deaf in her left.

== See also ==
- List of Asian American jurists

Legal offices
Preceded by Edward M. Chen	Judge of the United States District Court for the Northern District of California; 2023–present	Incumbent
