= Donald B. Ayer =

American attorney (born 1949)

Donald Ayer
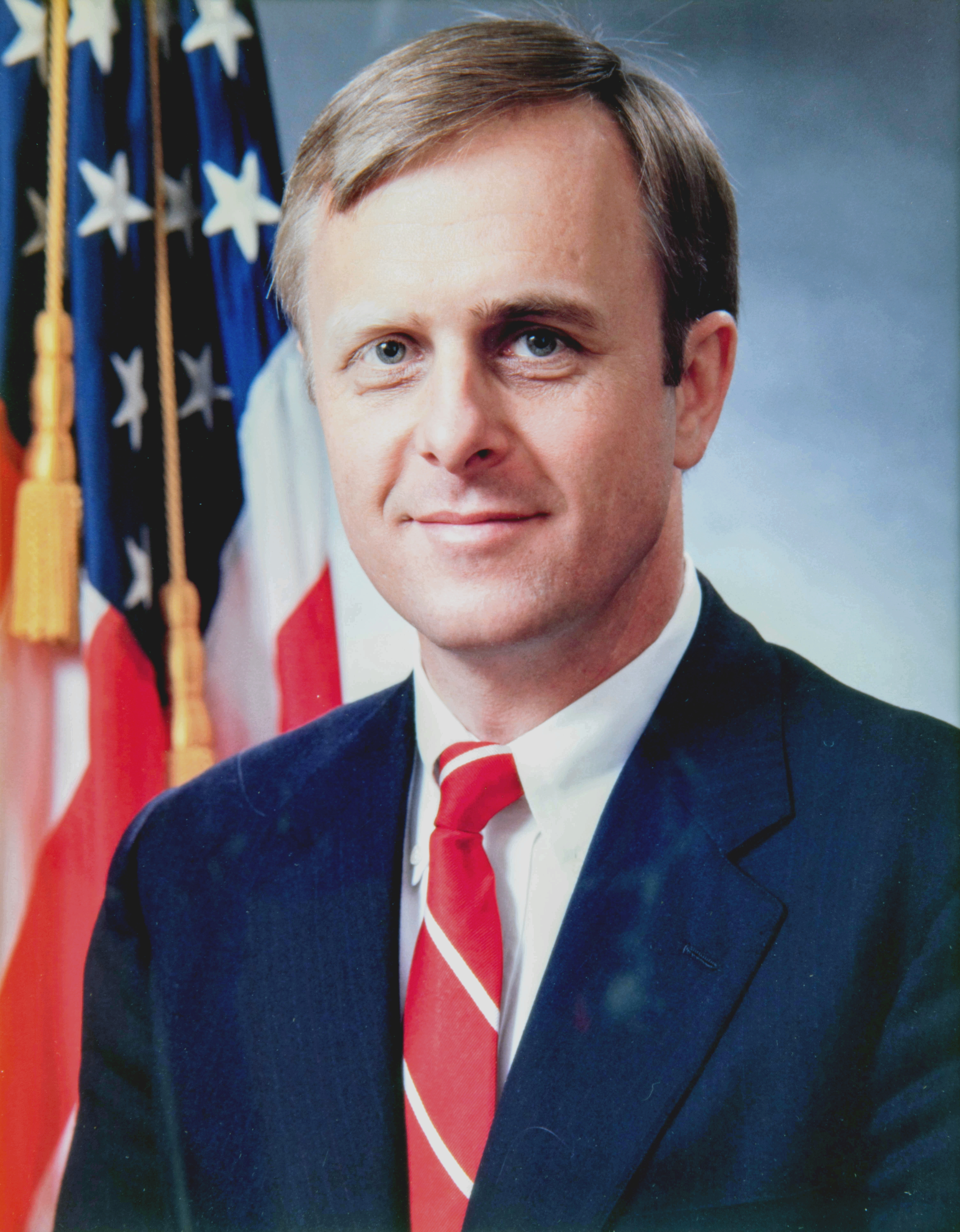

24th United States Deputy Attorney General
- In office November 1989 – May 11, 1990
- President: George H. W. Bush
- Preceded by: Harold G. Christensen
- Succeeded by: William Barr

Principal Deputy Solicitor General of the United States
- In office June 1986 – December 1988
- President: Ronald Reagan
- Succeeded by: John Roberts

United States Attorney for the Eastern District of California
- In office 1981–1986
- President: Ronald Reagan
- Preceded by: Francis Goldsberry
- Succeeded by: Peter Nowinski

Personal details
- Born: Donald Belton Ayer; April 30, 1949 (age 77) San Mateo, California, U.S.
- Party: Independent
- Spouse: Anne Norton
- Education: Stanford University (BA); Harvard University (MA, JD)

Donald Belton Ayer (born April 30, 1949) is an American attorney who served as the 24th U.S. deputy attorney general from 1989 to 1990 under President George H. W. Bush.

== Education and career ==
Ayer graduated from Stanford University with a Bachelor of Arts in history in 1971, with great distinction. In 1973, he graduated from Harvard University with a Master of Arts in American history, and received his J.D. from Harvard Law School in 1975. He clerked for Judge Malcolm Richard Wilkey of the U.S. Court of Appeals for the District of Columbia, followed by a year with Associate Justice William Rehnquist of the U.S. Supreme Court during the 1976 Term.

From 1977 to 1980, Ayer served as an Assistant U.S. Attorney for the Northern District of California. In 1981, President Ronald Reagan nominated Ayer as the U.S. Attorney for the Eastern District of California, and he held that position from 1981 to 1986. From 1986 to 1988, he served as Principal Deputy Solicitor General of the United States, and as Deputy Attorney General from 1989 until May 1990, when he was succeeded by William Barr.

Ayer entered private practice after leaving government service, and became a partner at Jones Day.

Ayer also sits on the bipartisan advisory board of States United Democracy Center.

== Personal life ==
Ayer has a wife, Anne, and two children.

== See also ==
- List of law clerks for the ninth seat of the Supreme Court of the United States

== Selected writings ==
- Ayer, Donald B. (October 30, 2016). "Opinion: Comey's mistaken quest for transparency". Washington Post.
