= D. Lowell Jensen =

American judge

Lowell Jensen
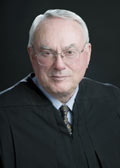

Senior Judge of the United States District Court for the Northern District of California
- In office June 27, 1997 – October 31, 2014

Judge of the United States District Court for the Northern District of California
- In office June 25, 1986 – June 27, 1997
- Appointed by: Ronald Reagan
- Preceded by: William H. Orrick Jr.
- Succeeded by: Charles Breyer

21st United States Deputy Attorney General
- In office May 1985 – June 25, 1986
- Appointed by: Ronald Reagan
- Preceded by: Carol E. Dinkins
- Succeeded by: Arnold Burns

United States Associate Attorney General
- In office 1983–1985
- Appointed by: Ronald Reagan
- Preceded by: Rudy Giuliani
- Succeeded by: Arnold Burns

United States Assistant Attorney General for the Criminal Division
- In office 1981–1983
- President: Ronald Reagan
- Preceded by: Philip Heymann
- Succeeded by: Stephen S. Trott

Personal details
- Born: Delwen Lowell Jensen; June 3, 1928 (age 98) Brigham City, Utah, U.S.
- Party: Democratic
- Education: University of California, Berkeley (BA, JD)

Delwen Lowell Jensen (born June 3, 1928) is an American jurist and former United States district judge of the United States District Court for the Northern District of California.

== Education and career ==
Born in Brigham City, Utah, Jensen received an Artium Baccalaureus degree from the University of California, Berkeley in 1949 and a Bachelor of Laws from the UC Berkeley School of Law in 1952. He served in the United States Army as a Corporal from 1952 to 1954. He was in private practice in Oakland, California, from 1954 to 1955.

Jensen was a deputy district attorney of Alameda County, California, from 1955 to 1966. Jensen received a LEAA grant to develop DALITE (District Attorney's Automated Legal Information System), a case management software program, like PROMIS (Prosecutor's Management Information System), developed by Inslaw. He was an assistant district attorney of Alameda County from 1966 to 1969. He was the District Attorney of Alameda County from 1969 to 1981. As district attorney Jensen oversaw prosecutions involving members of the Black Panthers and also the Patty Hearst prosecution.

He was the Assistant Attorney General of the Criminal Division of the United States Department of Justice from 1981 to 1983. He was the United States Associate Attorney General from 1983 to 1985, and the United States Deputy Attorney General from 1985 to 1986. In 1987 he was briefly considered for FBI director, but he withdrew his name from consideration.

== Federal judicial service ==
Jensen was a federal judge on the United States District Court for the Northern District of California. Jensen was nominated by President Ronald Reagan on June 2, 1986, to a seat on the United States District Court for the Northern District of California vacated by Judge William H. Orrick Jr. He was confirmed by the United States Senate on June 24, 1986, and received his commission on June 25, 1986. He assumed senior status on June 27, 1997. He retired from the court on October 31, 2014.

== Sources ==
- Civil Rights Greensboro: D. Lowell Jensen profile, uncg.edu; accessed June 8, 2017.
- Appearances on C-SPAN

Legal offices
Preceded by Philip Heymann	United States Assistant Attorney General for the Criminal Division; 1981–1983	Succeeded by Stephen S. Trott
Preceded by Rudy Giuliani	United States Associate Attorney General; 1983–1985	Succeeded by Arnold Burns
Preceded by Carol E. Dinkins	United States Deputy Attorney General; 1985–1986	Succeeded by Arnold Burns
Preceded by William H. Orrick Jr.	Judge of the United States District Court for the Northern District of California; 1986–1997	Succeeded by Charles Breyer
