= Edward C. Schmults =

American lawyer (born 1931)

19th United States Deputy Attorney General
- In office February 1981 – February 3, 1984
- President: Ronald Reagan
- Preceded by: Charles Byron Renfrew
- Succeeded by: Carol E. Dinkins

Personal details
- Born: Edward Charles Schmults; February 6, 1931 (age 95) Paterson, New Jersey, U.S.
- Spouse: Diane Beers
- Children: 3
- Education: Yale University; Harvard University
- Profession: lawyer

Edward Charles Schmults (born February 6, 1931) is an American lawyer who served as the Deputy Attorney General of the United States from 1981 to February 3, 1984. He attended Yale University and Harvard Law School. He was an officer in the United States Marine Corps. He was a partner with the law firm of White & Case before being named Deputy Attorney General. He resigned in 1984 to serve as general counsel and senior vice president of GTE.
