= Harold G. Christensen =

American attorney and US Deputy Attorney General

23rd United States Deputy Attorney General
- In office July 1988 – May 22, 1989
- President: Ronald Reagan
- Preceded by: Arnold Burns
- Succeeded by: Donald B. Ayer

Personal details
- Born: June 25, 1926 Springville, Utah, U.S.
- Died: November 14, 2012 (aged 86) Salt Lake City, Utah, U.S.
- Party: Republican
- Education: University of Michigan

Harold G. Christensen (June 25, 1926 – November 14, 2012) was an American attorney who served as United States Deputy Attorney General from 1988 to 1989.

At the age of 17, he served as a medic in the U.S. Navy during World War 2. He later attended the University of Utah for his undergraduate degree and the University of Michigan, where he obtained his law degree in 1951.

He briefly served as President Reagan's acting attorney general due to the resignation of Edwin Meese.

He died of cancer on November 14, 2012, in Salt Lake City, Utah at age 86.
